= History of the Netherlands =

The history of the Netherlands extends back before the founding of the modern Kingdom of the Netherlands in 1815 after the defeat of Napoleon. For thousands of years, people have been living together around the river deltas of this section of the North Sea coast. Written records begin in the first century BC when the region became a militarized border zone of the Roman Empire. As the Western Roman Empire collapsed and the Middle Ages began, three dominant Germanic peoples coalesced in the area – Frisians in the north and coastal areas, Low Saxons in the northeast, and the Franks to the south. By 800, the Frankish Carolingian dynasty had once again integrated the area into an empire covering a large part of Western Europe. The region was part of the duchy of Lower Lotharingia within the Holy Roman Empire, but neither the empire nor the duchy were governed in a centralized manner. For several centuries, medieval lordships such as Brabant, Holland, Zeeland, Friesland, Guelders and others held a changing patchwork of territories.

By 1433, the Duke of Burgundy had assumed control over most of Lower Lotharingia, creating the Burgundian Netherlands. This included what is now the Netherlands, Belgium, Luxembourg, and a part of France. When their heirs the Catholic kings of Spain took measures against Protestantism, the subsequent Dutch revolt led to the splitting in 1581 of the Netherlands into southern and northern parts. The southern "Spanish Netherlands" corresponds approximately to modern Belgium and Luxembourg, and the northern "United Provinces" (or "Dutch Republic)", which spoke Dutch and was predominantly Protestant, was the predecessor of the modern Netherlands.

In the Dutch Golden Age, which had its zenith around 1667, there was a flowering of trade, industry, and the sciences. The Dutch Republic practiced religious toleration and Amsterdam attracted Portuguese Jews, many of whom were merchants, that practiced their religion and engaged in economic activity. A worldwide Dutch empire developed in Asia and the Americas. The Dutch East India Company became one of the earliest and most important of national mercantile companies of the time, based on invasion, colonialism, and extraction of outside resources, but not religious evangelization. During the eighteenth century, the power, wealth and influence of the Netherlands declined. A series of wars with the more powerful British and French neighbours weakened it. The English seized the North American colony of New Amsterdam, and renamed it "New York". There was growing unrest and conflict between the Orangists and the Patriots. The French Revolution spilled over after 1789, and a pro-French Batavian Republic was established in 1795–1806. Napoleon made it a satellite state, the Kingdom of Holland (1806–1810), and later simply a French imperial province.

After the defeat of Napoleon in 1813–1815, an expanded "United Kingdom of the Netherlands" was created with the House of Orange as monarchs, also ruling Belgium and Luxembourg. After the King imposed unpopular Protestant reforms on Belgium, it left the kingdom in 1830 and new borders were agreed in 1839. After an initially conservative period, following the introduction of the 1848 constitution, the country became a parliamentary democracy with a constitutional monarch. Modern-day Luxembourg became officially independent of the Netherlands in 1839, but a personal union remained until 1890. Since 1890, it is ruled by another branch of the same dynasty.

The Netherlands was neutral during the First World War, but during the Second World War, it was invaded and occupied by Nazi Germany. The Nazis, including many collaborators, rounded up and killed almost all of the country's Jewish population. When the Dutch resistance increased, the Nazis cut off food supplies to much of the country, causing severe starvation in 1944–1945. In 1942, the Dutch East Indies were conquered by Japan, but prior to this the Dutch destroyed the oil wells for which Japan was desperate. Indonesia proclaimed its independence from the Netherlands in 1945, followed by Suriname in 1975. The post-war years saw rapid economic recovery (helped by the American Marshall Plan), followed by the introduction of a welfare state during an era of peace and prosperity. The Netherlands formed a new economic alliance with Belgium and Luxembourg, the Benelux, and all three became founding members of the European Union and NATO. In recent decades, the Dutch economy has been closely linked to that of Germany and is highly prosperous. The four countries adopted the euro on 1 January 2002, along with eight other EU member states.

History of the Low Countries (schematic)
Frisii		Germanic tribes		Belgae & Celts			
Frisii	Cana– nefates (Note: Roman foederati)	Chamavi, Tubantes (Note: The Chamavi merged into the confederation of the Franks; the Tubantes merged into the confederation of the Saxons.)		Gallia Belgica (55 BC–c. 5th century AD); Germania Inferior (83–c. 5th century)			
Frisii	Cana– nefates	Salian Franks		Batavi			
unpopulated (4th –c. 5th centuries)		Saxons	Salian Franks (4th–c. 5th centuries)				
Frisian Kingdom (c. 6th century – 734)		Saxons	Frankish Kingdom (481–843)—Carolingian Empire (800–843)				
Frisian Kingdom (c. 6th century – 734)		Austrasia (511–687)					
Middle Francia (843–855)				West; Francia (from 843)	Middle Francia (843–855)		
Kingdom of Lotharingia (Note: Part of East Francia after 939, divided in Upper Lorraine (as part of West Francia) and Lower Lorraine (as part of East Francia) in 959.) (855–959); Duchy of Lower Lorraine (Note: Lower Lorraine—also referred to as Lothier—disintegrated into several smaller independent territories and only the title of a "Duke of Lothier" remained, held by Brabant.) (from 959)			Kingdom of Lotharingia (855–959); Duchy of Lower Lorraine (from 959)	West; Francia (from 843)	Kingdom of Lotharingia (855–959); Duchy of Lower Lorraine (from 959)		
Frisia			Kingdom of Lotharingia (855–959); Duchy of Lower Lorraine (from 959)	County of Flanders (Note: Including County of Artois (part of Flanders until 1237) and Tournaisis.) (862–1384)	Kingdom of Lotharingia (855–959); Duchy of Lower Lorraine (from 959)		
Frisian; Freedom (Note: Lordship of Frisia and Lordship of Groningen (including the Ommelanden) after 1524 and 1536 respectively.) (11th–16th centuries)	County of Holland (Note: Including County of Zeeland, that was ruled by neighboring County of Holland and County of Flanders (until 1432).) (880–1432)	Bishopric of Utrecht (Note: Utrecht included Lordship of Overijssel (until 1528), County of Drenthe (until 1528) and County of Zutphen (until 1182).) (695–1456)	Duchy of Brabant (Note: Duchy of Brabant included since 1288 also the Duchy of Limburg (now part of Belgium's Liège Province) and the "Overmaas" lands Dalhem, Valkenburg and Herzogenrath (now part of the Dutch Province of Limburg).) (1183–1430) Duchy of Guelders (Note: The county, later duchy, of Guelders consisted of four quarters, as they were separated by rivers: situated upstream Upper Quarter (the present day northern half of the Dutch province of Limburg), spatially separated from the three downstream Lower Quarters: County of Zutphen (after 1182), Veluwe Quarter and Nijmegen Quarter. The three lower quarters emerged from the historic gau Hamaland (named after the Chamavi tribe), and formed the present day province of Gelderland. Guelders did not include the Cleves enclave Huissen and the independent counties of Buren and Culemborg, that were much later seceded to the province of Gelderland.) (1046–1543)	County of Flanders (862–1384)	County of Hainaut (1071–1432) County of Namur (981–1421)	Prince- Bishopric of Liège (Note: Throughout the Middle Ages, the bishopric was further expanded with the Duchy of Bouillon in 1096 (ceded to France in 1678), the acquisition of the county of Loon in 1366 and the county of Horne in 1568. The Lordship of Mechelen was also part of the Prince-Bishopric of Liège.)(980–1791)	Duchy of Luxembourg (1059–1443)
Frisian; Freedom (11th–16th centuries)	Burgundian Netherlands (1384–1482)					Prince- Bishopric of Liège (980–1791)	Burgundian Netherlands (1384–1482)
Habsburg Netherlands (1482–1795) (Seventeen Provinces after 1543) (Note: The name Seventeen Provinces came in use after the Habsburg emperor Charles V had re-acquired the Duchy of Guelders, and an continuous territory arose.)						Prince- Bishopric of Liège (980–1791)	Habsburg Netherlands (1482–1795) (Seventeen Provinces after 1543)
Dutch Republic (1581–1795)				Spanish Netherlands (1556–1714)		Prince- Bishopric of Liège (980–1791)	Spanish Netherlands (1556–1714)
Dutch Republic (1581–1795)				Austrian Netherlands (1714–1795)		Prince- Bishopric of Liège (980–1791)	Austrian Netherlands (1714–1795)
Dutch Republic (1581–1795)				United States of Belgium (1790)		Republic of Liège (1789–'91)	United States of Belgium (1790)
Dutch Republic (1581–1795)				Austrian Netherlands (1795–1797)		P.-Bish. of Liège (1791–1794)	Austrian Netherlands (1795–1797)
Batavian Republic (1795–1806); Kingdom of Holland (1806–1810)			associated with French First Republic (1795–1804) part of First French Empire (1804–1815)				
part of First French Empire (1810–1813)			associated with French First Republic (1795–1804) part of First French Empire (1804–1815)				
Sovereign Principality of the Netherlands (1813–1815)			associated with French First Republic (1795–1804) part of First French Empire (1804–1815)				
United Kingdom of the Netherlands (1815–1830)							Grand Duchy of Luxembourg (from 1815)
Kingdom of the Netherlands (from 1839)				Kingdom of Belgium (from 1830)			Grand Duchy of Luxembourg (from 1815)
Kingdom of the Netherlands (from 1839)				Kingdom of Belgium (from 1830)			Grand Duchy of Luxembourg (from 1890)

== Prehistory (before 57 BC) ==
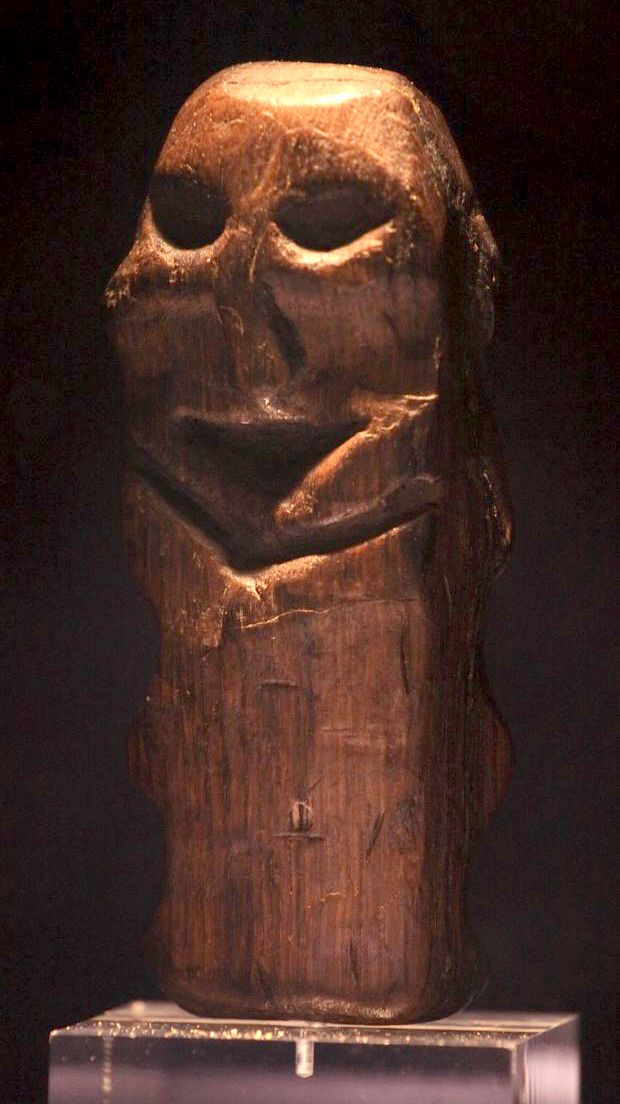
An oak figurine found in Willemstad, the Netherlands, dating from around 4500 BC. On display in the Rijksmuseum van Oudheden in Leiden. Height: 12.5 cm (4.9 in).

During the last ice age, the Netherlands had a tundra climate with scarce vegetation, and the inhabitants survived as hunter-gatherers. The Swifterbant culture, appearing around 5600 BC were hunter gatherers strongly linked to rivers and open water and related to the southern Scandinavian Ertebølle culture. Prior to 6500 BCE and the submerging of Doggerland, the area of the Netherlands was inland.

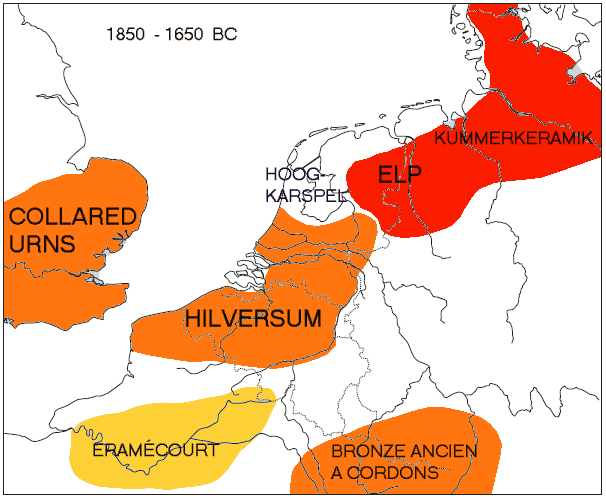
Location of the Elp and Hilversum cultures in the Bronze Age

Agriculture also arrived in areas near the Netherlands somewhere around 5000 BC with the Linear Pottery culture, who were central European farmers with Mediterranean ancestry. Their farms were restricted to southern Limburg and only temporarily established. However, there is some evidence that the coastal Swifterband people took up pottery and animal husbandry in the rest of the country. Local groups made the switch to animal husbandry sometime between 4800 BC and 4500 BC. By about 4000 BC the Funnelbeaker culture brought farming permanently into the region. This culture extended from Denmark through northern Germany into the northern Netherlands. The Vlaardingen culture continued the hunter-gatherer tradition in coastal areas.

By around 2950 BCE, there was a transition from the Funnelbeaker farming culture to the Corded Ware culture which extended across much of northern and central Europe. The expansion of this culture is believed to have involved the movement of people from the direction of Ukraine, bringing Indo-European languages and Copper Age technology. The earliest bronze tools were in the Wageningen horde, found in the grave of a Bronze Age metalworker. The Elp culture in the north and the Hilversum culture in the south developed during the Bronze Age, with the latter having cultural ties with Britain.

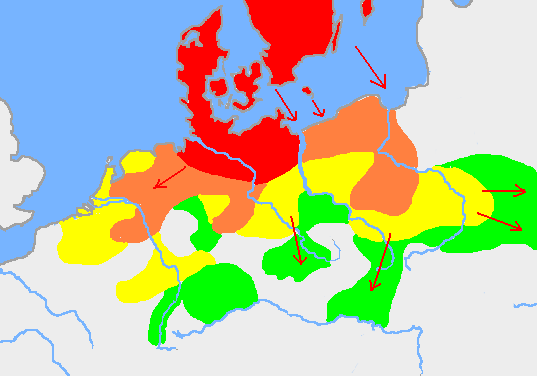
Distribution of the primary Germanic groups c. 1 AD

The Iron Age brought a measure of prosperity to the people living in the area of the present-day Netherlands with iron ore available throughout the country. Smiths travelled from small settlement to settlement with bronze and iron, fabricating tools on demand, including axes, knives, pins, arrowheads and swords. The Vorstengraf large burial mound contained a number of objects, including a curved iron sword. Leading up to the arrival of the Romans, Harpstedt Culture arose in the north, which may have included speakers of Germanic languages. Further to the south were peoples influenced by the Hallstatt culture who may have been Celtic speakers. As in other parts of Europe this was eventually replaced by the La Tène culture, which is more confidently associated with Celtic. Some scholars have speculated that a separate ethnic identity with its own language that was neither Germanic nor Celtic formed a Nordwestblock which stretched between the two, from the Somme to the Weser, possibly surviving until the early Roman period, by which time Celtic and Germanic languages were spreading into the region.

== Roman era (57 BC – 410 AD) ==
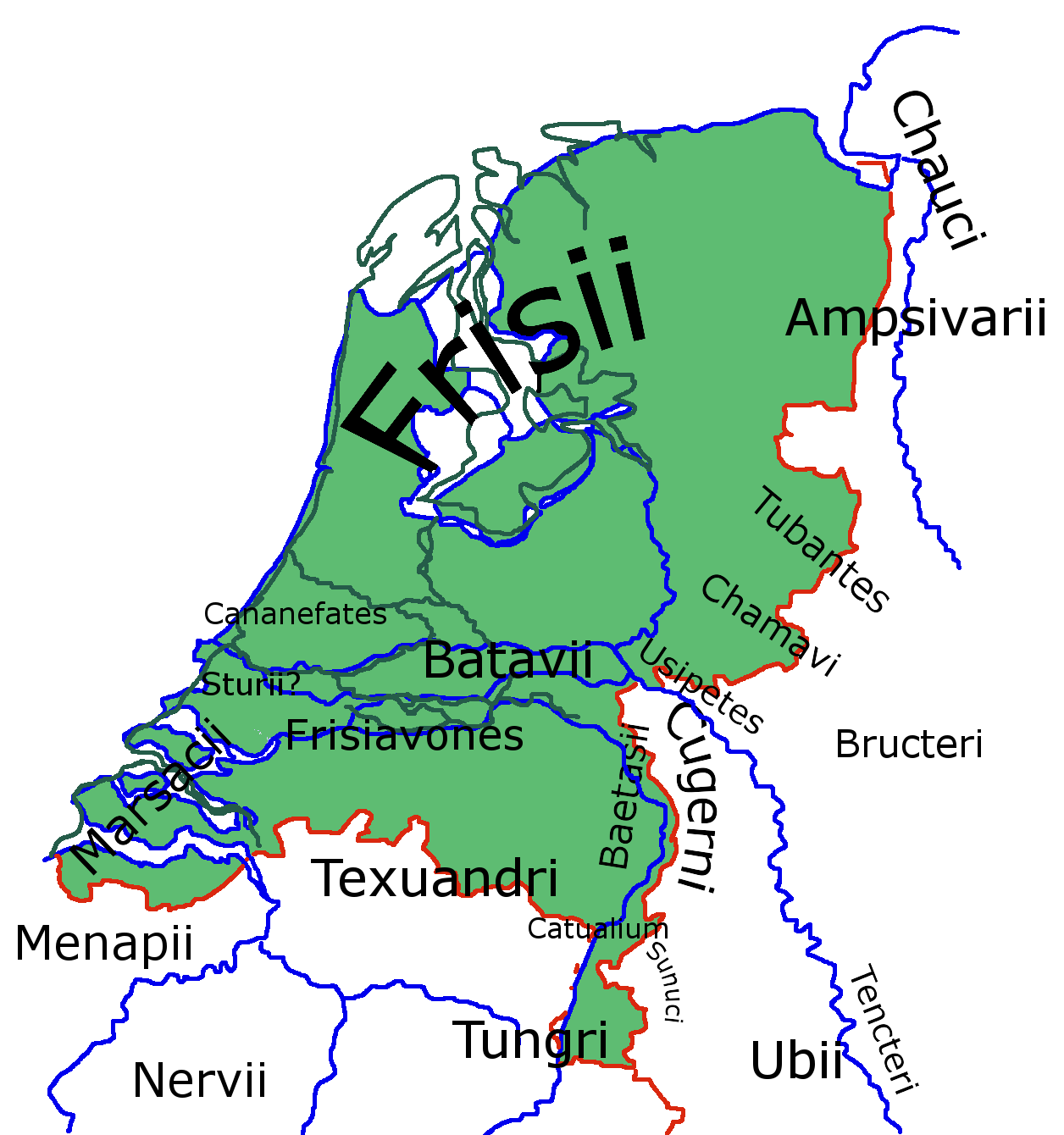
Tribes during the Roman Empire

During his Gallic Wars, Julius Caesar conquered all of Gaul for Rome, and this included the Netherlands south of the Rhine. He also wrote about his experiences in his Commentarii de Bello Gallico, which is the first surviving written account of the region. Caesar mentioned the Menapii living in the river delta, and the Eburones to their southeast towards what is now Limburg. He called the land between the Rhine and Waal "the island of the Batavi" (insula batavorum). He portrayed the Rhine as a natural boundary between the Gauls and Germanic peoples on the other side but he understood that peoples such as the Eburones had a kinship with their neighbours over the river. Later Roman authors such as Tacitus and Pliny the Elder describe the region north of the Rhine being inhabited by the Frisii, Chamavi and Tubantes. Within the delta lived the Cananefates, Batavians, Sturii, Marsacii, and Frisiavones. The Texuandri, Baetasii and Tungri lived south of the delta.

The 450 years of Roman rule profoundly changed the region that would later become the Netherlands. The Rhine was a militarized border, frequently destabilized by violent incursions, and Rome recruited soldiers on both sides of it. The tribes of the region were esteemed soldiers in the empire, often serving in the Roman cavalry. The frontier culture was influenced by Roman, Germanic, and Gaulish elements, and trade flourished after Rome's conquest of Gaul. There were still grievances against Roman rule, including the taking of young Batavians as slaves. This led to the Batavian rebellion under Gaius Julius Civilis in 69 AD, which resulted in the burning of several Roman Castellum and the desertion of sections of the northern Roman army. In April 70 AD, legions led by Quintus Petillius Cerialis defeated the rebels.

The Batavians were considered the "true" forefathers of the Dutch by 17th and 18th-century writers, inspiring the naming of colonial Jakarta as "Batavia" in 1619 and the Batavian Republic of 1795. The term "Batavian" is occasionally used to describe the Dutch today, similar to how "Gallic" describes the French. A Frankish identity emerged in the lower and middle Rhine valley during the first half of the 3rd century, forming a confederation of smaller Germanic groups including the descendants of the Batavian rebels. The Frisii probably disappeared from the northern Netherlands with the last reference to them in c. 296, likely due to resettlement to other areas of Roman control and coastal flooding.

== Early Middle Ages (411–1000) ==
=== Frisians ===
Map showing roughly the distribution of Franks and Frisians c. 716

As climatic conditions improved, there was another mass migration of Germanic peoples into the area from the east. This is known as the "Migration Period" (Volksverhuizingen). The northern Netherlands received an influx of new migrants and settlers, mostly Saxons, but also Angles and Jutes. Many of these migrants did not stay in the northern Netherlands but moved on to England and are known today as the Anglo-Saxons. The newcomers who stayed in the northern Netherlands would eventually be referred to as "Frisians", although they were not descended from the ancient Frisii. These new Frisians settled in the northern Netherlands and would become the ancestors of the modern Frisians. (Because the early Frisians and Anglo-Saxons were formed from largely identical tribal confederacies, their respective languages were very similar. Old Frisian is the most closely related language to Old English and the modern Frisian dialects are in turn the closest related languages to contemporary English.) By the end of the 6th century, the Frisian territory in the northern Netherlands had expanded west to the North Sea coast and, by the 7th century, south to Dorestad. During this period most of the northern Netherlands was known as Frisia. This extended Frisian territory is sometimes referred to as Frisia Magna (or Greater Frisia).

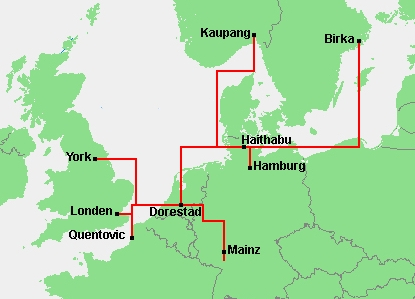
Dorestad and main trade routes

In the 7th and 8th centuries, the Frankish chronologies mention this area as the kingdom of the Frisians. This kingdom comprised the coastal provinces of the Netherlands and the German North Sea coast. During this time, the Frisian language was spoken along the entire southern North Sea coast. The 7th-century Frisian Kingdom (650–734) under King Aldegisel and King Redbad, had its centre of power in Utrecht.

Dorestad was the largest settlement (emporia) in northwestern Europe. It had grown around a former Roman fortress. It was a large, flourishing trading place, three kilometers long and situated where the rivers Rhine and Lek diverge southeast of Utrecht near the modern town of Wijk bij Duurstede. Although inland, it was a North Sea trading centre that primarily handled goods from the Middle Rhineland. Wine was among the major products traded at Dorestad, likely from vineyards south of Mainz. It was also widely known because of its mint. Between 600 and around 719 Dorestad was often fought over between the Frisians and the Franks.

=== Franks ===
Expansion of the Franks from 481 to 870

After Roman government in the area collapsed, the Franks expanded their territories until there were numerous small Frankish kingdoms, especially at Cologne, Tournai, Le Mans and Cambrai. The kings of Tournai eventually came to subdue the other Frankish kings. By the 490s, Clovis I had conquered and united all the Frankish territories to the west of the Meuse, including those in the southern Netherlands. He continued his conquests into Gaul.

After the death of Clovis I in 511, his four sons partitioned his kingdom amongst themselves, with Theuderic I receiving the lands that were to become Austrasia (including the southern Netherlands). A line of kings descended from Theuderic ruled Austrasia until 555, when it was united with the other Frankish kingdoms of Chlothar I, who inherited all the Frankish realms by 558. He redivided the Frankish territory amongst his four sons, but the four kingdoms coalesced into three on the death of Charibert I in 567. Austrasia (including the southern Netherlands) was given to Sigebert I. The southern Netherlands remained the northern part of Austrasia until the rise of the Carolingians.

The Franks who expanded south into Gaul settled there and eventually adopted the Vulgar Latin of the local population. However, a Germanic language was spoken as a second tongue by public officials in western Austrasia and Neustria as late as the 850s. It completely disappeared as a spoken language from these regions during the 10th century. During this expansion to the south, many Frankish people remained in the north (i.e. southern Netherlands, Flanders and a small part of northern France). A widening cultural divide grew between the Franks remaining in the north and the rulers far to the south in what is now France. Salian Franks continued to reside in their original homeland and the area directly to the south and to speak their original language, Old Frankish, which by the 9th century had evolved into Old Dutch. A Dutch-French language boundary came into existence (but this was originally south of where it is today). In the Maas and Rhine areas of the Netherlands, the Franks had political and trading centres, especially at Nijmegen and Maastricht. These Franks remained in contact with the Frisians to the north, especially in places like Dorestad and Utrecht.

=== Doubts over archaeological divisions ===
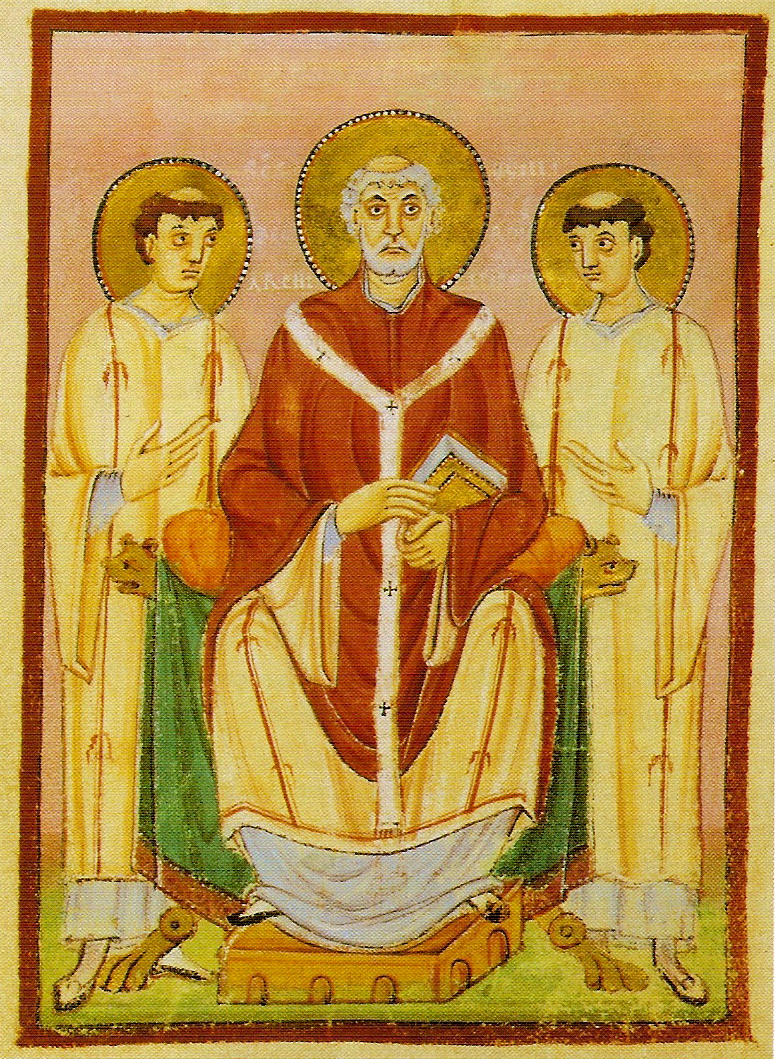
Saint Willibrord, Anglo-Saxon missionary from Northumberland, Apostle to the Frisians, first bishop of Utrecht

In the 19th century, Dutch historians believed that the Franks, Frisians, and Saxons had populated and inhabited the Low Countries, but this theory fell out of favour in the 20th century. Due to the scarcity of written sources, knowledge of this period depends to a large degree on the interpretation of archaeological data. The traditional view of a clear-cut division between Frisians in the north and coast, Franks in the south and Saxons in the east has proven historically problematic. Archeological evidence suggests dramatically different models for different regions, with demographic continuity for some parts of the country and depopulation and possible replacement in other parts, notably the coastal areas of Frisia and Holland.

=== Emergence of the Dutch language ===
The language from which Old Dutch arose is unknown with certainty, but it is thought to be the language spoken by the Salian Franks. Even though the Franks are traditionally categorized as Weser–Rhine Germanic, Dutch has a number of Ingvaeonic characteristics and is classified by some modern linguists as an Ingvaeonic language. Dutch also has a number of Old Saxon characteristics. There was a close relationship between Old Dutch, Old Saxon, Old English and Old Frisian. Because texts written in the language spoken by the Franks are almost non-existent, and Old Dutch texts scarce and fragmentary, not much is known about the development of Old Dutch. Old Dutch made the transition to Middle Dutch around 1150.

=== Christianization ===
The Christianity that arrived in the Netherlands with the Romans appears not to have died out completely (in Maastricht, at least) after the withdrawal of the Romans in about 411.

The Franks became Christians after their king Clovis I converted to Catholicism, an event which is traditionally set in 496. Christianity was introduced in the north after the conquest of Friesland by the Franks. The Saxons in the east were converted before the conquest of Saxony, and became Frankish allies.

Hiberno-Scottish and Anglo-Saxon missionaries, particularly Willibrord, Wulfram and Boniface, played an important role in converting the Frankish and Frisian peoples to Christianity by the 8th century. Boniface was martyred by the Frisians in Dokkum (754).

=== Frankish dominance and incorporation into the Holy Roman Empire ===
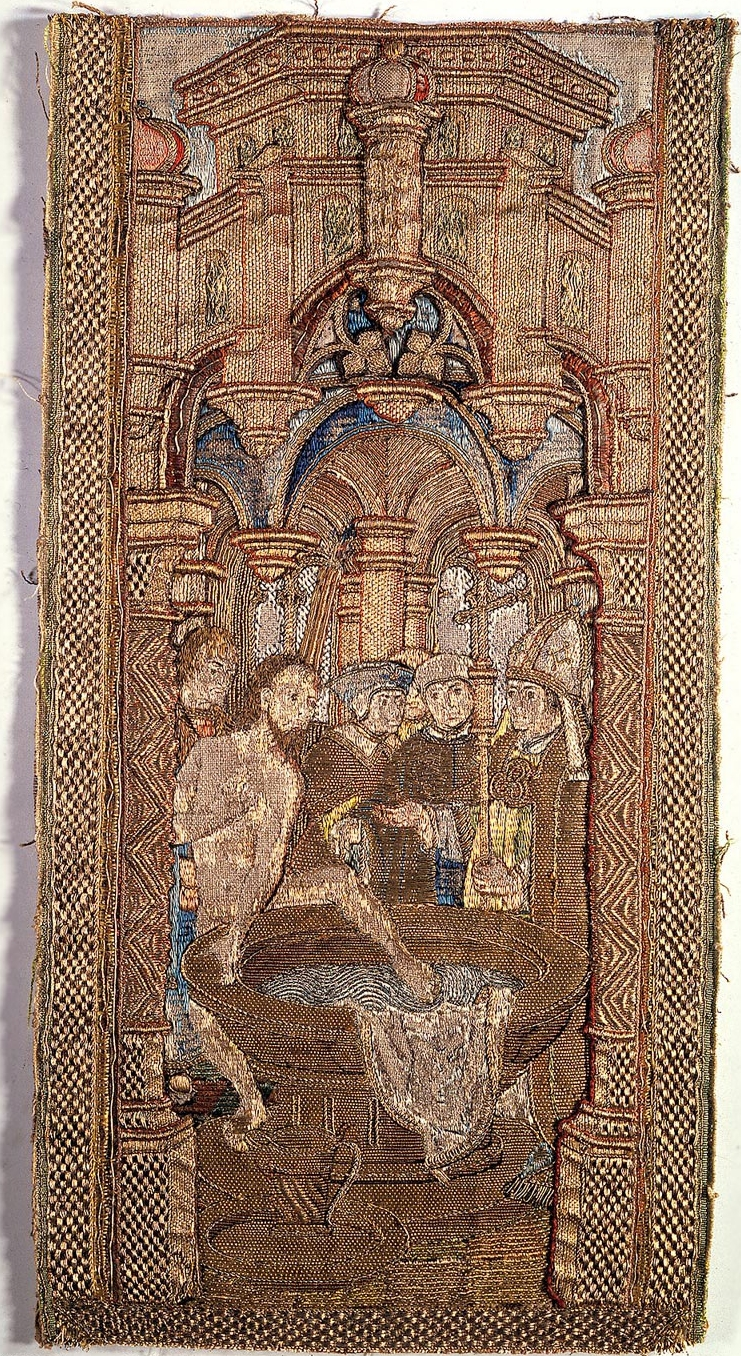
An early 16th-century tapestry depicting the near baptism of Redbad, King of the Frisians, who died in 719

In the early 8th century the Frisians came increasingly into conflict with the Franks to the south, resulting in a series of wars in which the Frankish Empire eventually subjugated Frisia. In 734, at the Battle of the Boarn, the Frisians in the Netherlands were defeated by the Franks, who thereby conquered the area west of the Lauwers. The Franks then conquered the area east of the Lauwers in 785 when Charlemagne defeated Widukind.

The linguistic descendants of the Franks, the modern Dutch -speakers of the Netherlands and Flanders, seem to have broken with the endonym "Frank" around the 9th century. By this time Frankish identity had changed from an ethnic identity to a national identity, becoming localized and confined to the modern Franconia and principally to the French province of Île-de-France.

Although the people no longer referred to themselves as "Franks", the Netherlands was still part of the Frankish empire of Charlemagne. Indeed, because of the Austrasian origins of the Carolingians in the area between the Rhine and the Maas, the cities of Aachen, Maastricht, Liège and Nijmegen were at the heart of Carolingian culture. Charlemagne maintained his palatium in Nijmegen at least four times.

The Carolingian Empire would eventually include France, Germany, northern Italy and much of Western Europe. In 843, the Frankish empire was divided into three parts, giving rise to West Francia in the west, East Francia in the east, and Middle Francia in the centre. Most of what is today the Netherlands became part of Middle Francia; Flanders became part of West Francia. This division was an important factor in the historical distinction between Flanders and the other Dutch-speaking areas.

Middle Francia (Latin: Francia media) was an ephemeral Frankish kingdom that had no historical or ethnic identity to bind its varied peoples. It was created by the Treaty of Verdun in 843, which divided the Carolingian Empire among the sons of Louis the Pious. Situated between the realms of East and West Francia, Middle Francia comprised the Frankish territory between the rivers Rhine and Scheldt, the Frisian coast of the North Sea, the former Kingdom of Burgundy (except for a western portion, later known as Bourgogne), Provence and the Kingdom of Italy.

Middle Francia fell to Lothair I, the eldest son and successor of Louis the Pious, after an intermittent civil war with his younger brothers Louis the German and Charles the Bald. In acknowledgement of Lothair's Imperial title, Middle Francia contained the imperial cities of Aachen, the residence of Charlemagne, as well as Rome. In 855, on his deathbed at Prüm Abbey, Emperor Lothair I again partitioned his realm amongst his sons. Most of the lands north of the Alps, including the Netherlands, passed to Lothair II and consecutively were named Lotharingia. After Lothair II died in 869, Lotharingia was partitioned by his uncles Louis the German and Charles the Bald in the Treaty of Meerssen in 870. Although some of the Netherlands had come under Viking control, in 870 it became part of East Francia. From 962, upon the imperial coronation of Otto I, the present–day Netherlands formed part of the Holy Roman Empire within the German Kingdom.

=== Viking trade and raids ===
In the 9th and 10th centuries, the Vikings raided the largely defenceless Frisian and Frankish towns lying on the coast and along the rivers of the Low Countries. Although Vikings never settled in large numbers in those areas, they did set up long-term bases and were even acknowledged as lords in a few cases. In Frankish, Frisian and Anglo-Saxon chronicles, the trading centre of Dorestad was raided multiple times from 834 to 863; however, since no convincing Viking archaeological evidence of destruction has been found at the site, doubts about this have grown in recent years, as they just may have come as traders.

One of the most important Viking families in the Low Countries was that of Rorik of Dorestad (based in Wieringen) and his brother the "younger Harald" (based in Walcheren), both thought to be nephews of Harald Klak. Around 850, Lothair I acknowledged Rorik as ruler of most of Friesland. And again in 870, Rorik was received by Charles the Bald in Nijmegen, to whom he became a vassal. Viking raids continued during that period. Harald's son Rodulf and his men were killed by the people of Oostergo in 873. Rorik died sometime before 882.

Buried Viking treasures consisting mainly of silver have been found in the Low Countries. Two such treasures have been found in Wieringen. A large treasure found in Wieringen in 1996 dates from around 850 and is thought perhaps to have been connected to Rorik. The burial of such a valuable treasure is seen as an indication that there was a permanent settlement in Wieringen.

Around 879, Godfrid arrived in Frisian lands as the head of a large force that terrorised the Low Countries. Using Ghent as his base, they ravaged Ghent, Maastricht, Liège, Stavelot, Prüm, Cologne, and Koblenz. Controlling most of Frisia between 882 and his death in 885, Godfrid became known to history as Godfrid, Duke of Frisia. His lordship over Frisia was acknowledged by Charles the Fat, to whom he became a vassal. Godfried was assassinated in 885, after which Gerolf of Holland assumed lordship and Viking rule of Frisia came to an end.

Viking raids of the Low Countries continued for over a century. Remains of Viking attacks dating from 880 to 890 have been found in Zutphen and Deventer. In 920, King Henry of Germany liberated Utrecht. According to a number of chronicles, the last attacks took place in the first decade of the 11th century and were directed at Tiel and/or Utrecht.

These Viking raids occurred about the same time that French and German lords were fighting for supremacy over the middle empire that included the Netherlands, so their sway over this area was weak. Resistance to the Vikings, if any, came from local nobles, who gained in stature as a result.

== High and Late Middle Ages (1000–1433) ==
=== Part of the Holy Roman Empire ===
The German kings and Holy Roman Emperors ruled the Netherlands in the 10th and 11th century with the assistance of the Dukes of Lotharingia, and the bishops of Utrecht and Liège. Germany was called the Holy Roman Empire after the coronation of King Otto the Great as emperor. The Dutch city of Nijmegen used to be the spot of an important domain of the German emperors. Several German emperors were born and died there, including, for example, Byzantine empress Theophanu, who died in Nijmegen. Utrecht was also an important city and trading port at the time.

=== Political disunity ===
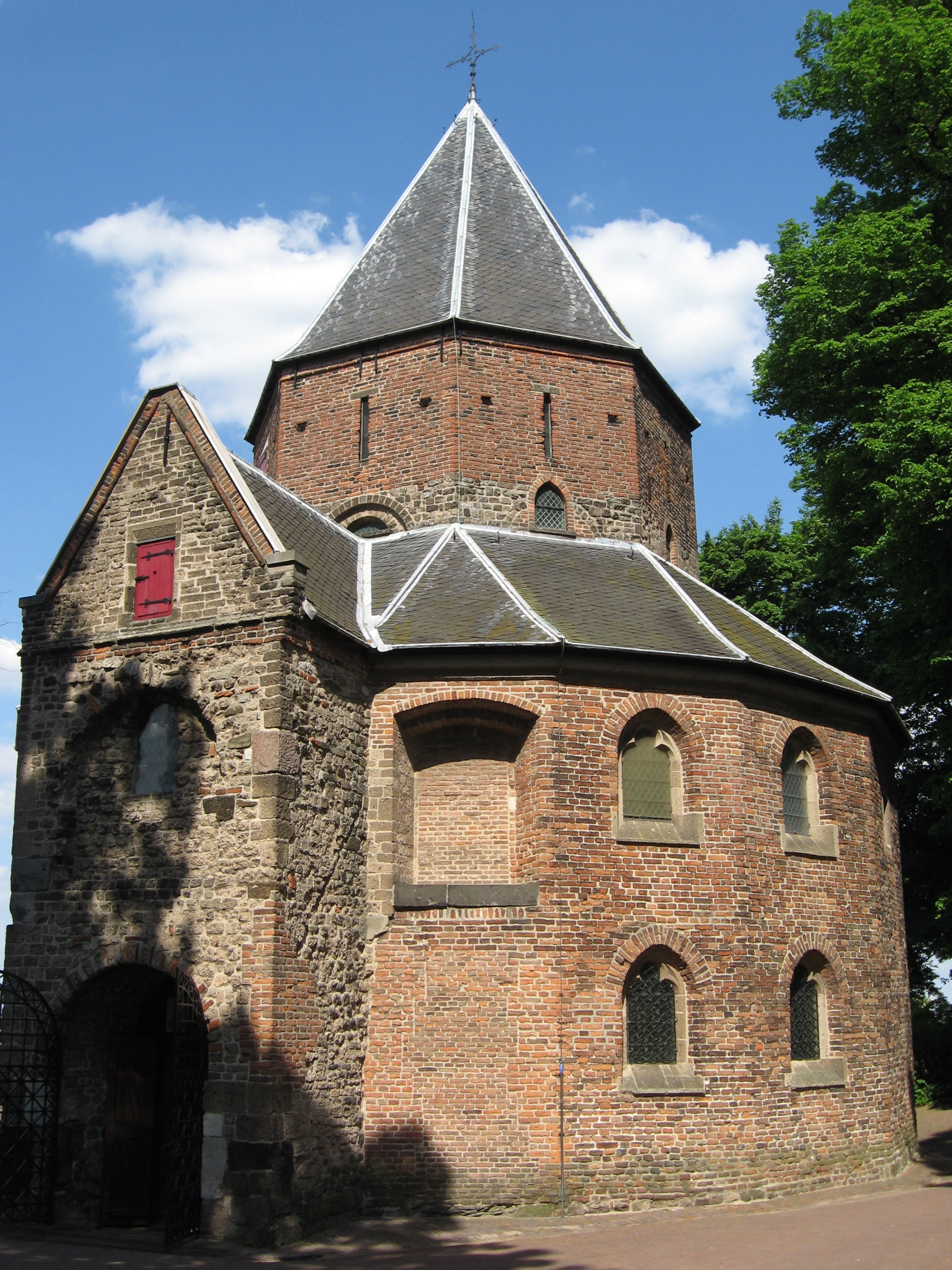
Chapel of St Nicholas (Sint-Nicolaaskapel (Nijmegen) or Valkhofkapel) in Nijmegen, one of the oldest buildings in the Netherlands

The Holy Roman Empire was not able to maintain political unity. In addition to the growing independence of the towns, local rulers turned their counties and duchies into private kingdoms and felt little sense of obligation to the emperor who reigned over large parts of the nation in name only. Large parts of what now comprise the Netherlands were governed by the Count of Holland, the Duke of Gelre, the Duke of Brabant and the Bishop of Utrecht. Friesland and Groningen in the north maintained their independence and were governed by the lower nobility.

The various feudal states were in a state of almost continual war. Gelre and Holland fought for control of Utrecht. Utrecht, whose bishop had in 1000 ruled over half of what is today the Netherlands, was marginalised as it experienced continuing difficulty in electing new bishops. At the same time, the dynasties of neighbouring states were more stable. Groningen, Drenthe and most of Gelre, which used to be part of Utrecht, became independent. Brabant tried to conquer its neighbours, but was not successful. Holland also tried to assert itself in Zeeland and Friesland, but its attempts failed.

=== The Frisians ===
The language and culture of most of the people who lived in the area that is now Holland were originally Frisian. The sparsely populated area was known as "West Friesland" (Westfriesland). A common theory states that Frankish migration from either Flanders, Utrecht or both displaced the Frisians in Holland, however no evidence has been found in support of this theory and more recent studies have suggested that Frisians from the mouth of the Rhine adopted the Franconian language, feudal system and religion, spreading this new 'Hollandic' identity northward over the centuries. (the part of North Holland situated north of Alkmaar is still known as West Friesland.

The rest of Friesland in the north continued to maintain its independence during this time. It had its own institutions (collectively called the "Frisian freedom") and resented the imposition of the feudal system and the patriciate found in other European towns. They regarded themselves as allies of Switzerland. The Frisian battle cry was "better dead than a slave". They later lost their independence when they were defeated in 1498 by the German Landsknecht mercenaries of Duke Albrecht of Saxony-Meissen.

=== The rise of Holland ===
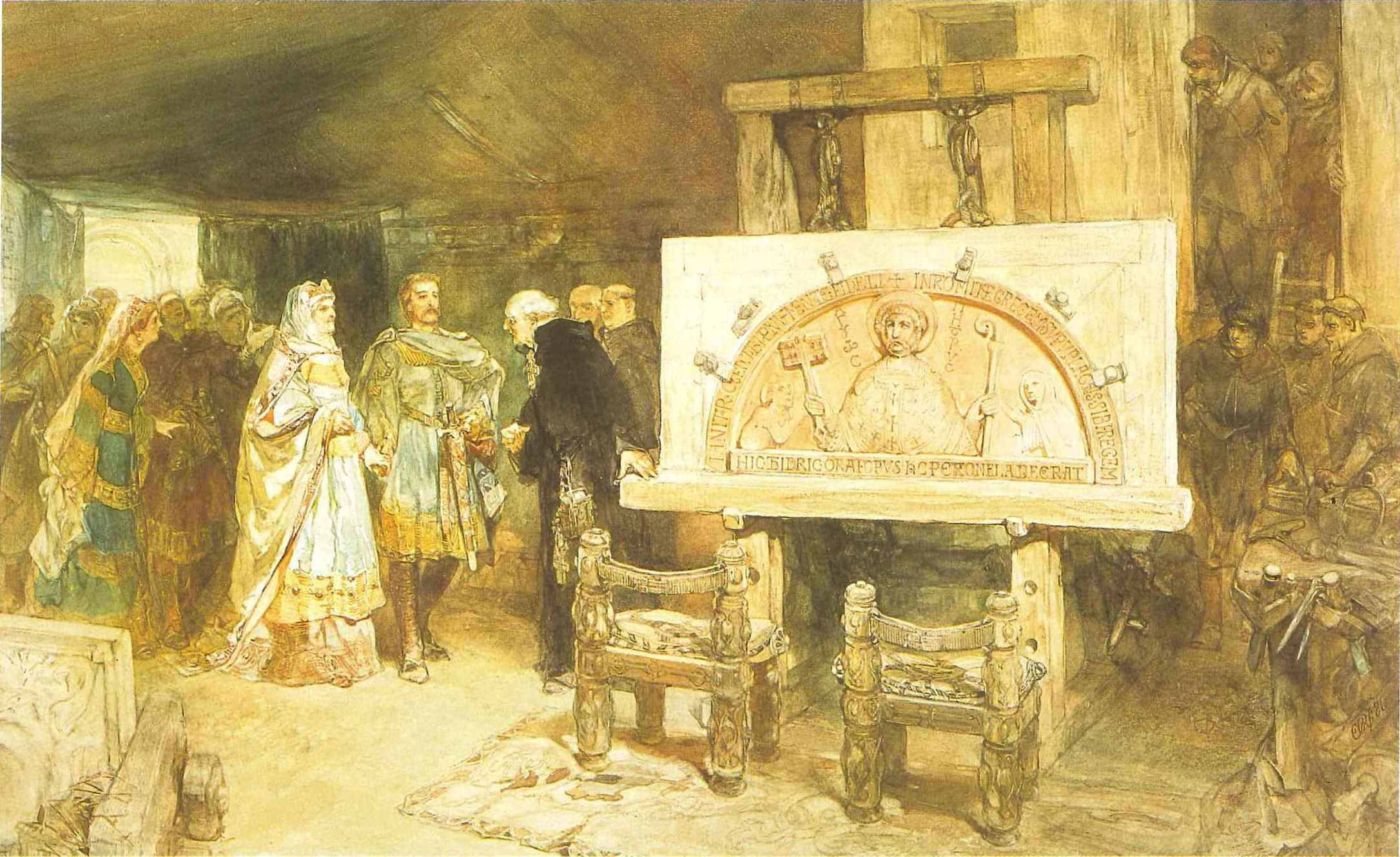
Dirk VI, Count of Holland, 1114–1157, and his mother Petronella visiting the work on the Egmond Abbey, Charles Rochussen, 1881. The sculpture is the Egmond Tympanum, depicting the two visitors on either side of Saint Peter.

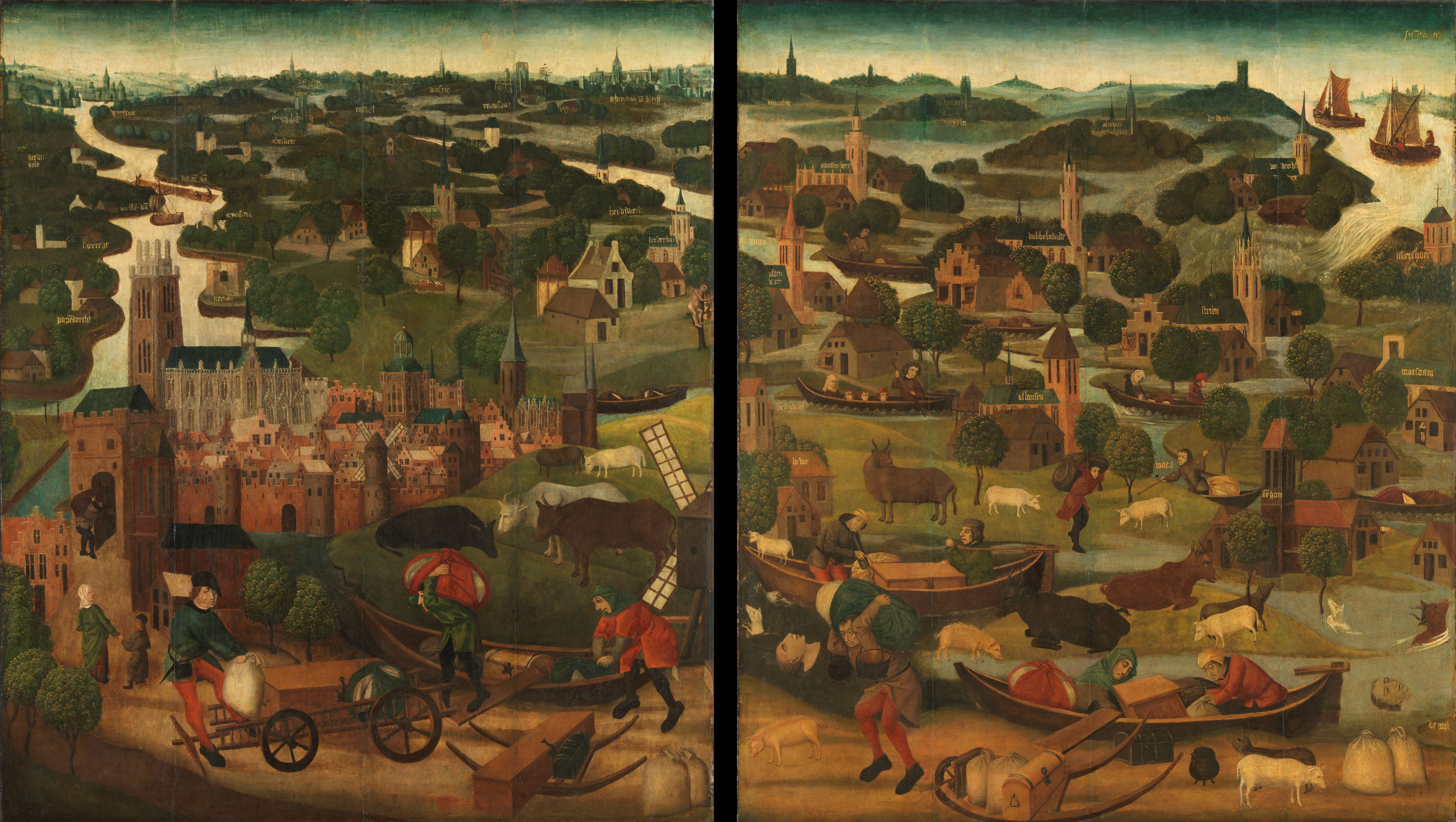
Two wings of an altar piece, c. 1500, depicting the St Elizabeth Flood of 18–19 November 1421, with Dordrecht at the front left

The center of power in these emerging independent territories was in the County of Holland. Originally granted as a fief to the Danish chieftain Rorik in return for loyalty to the emperor in 862, the region of Kennemara (the region around modern Haarlem) rapidly grew under Rorik's descendants in size and importance. By the early 11th century, Dirk III, Count of Holland was levying tolls on the Meuse estuary and was able to resist military intervention from his overlord, the Duke of Lower Lorraine.

In 1083, the name "Holland" first appears in a deed referring to a region corresponding more or less to the current province of South Holland and the southern half of what is now North Holland. Holland's influence continued to grow over the next two centuries. The counts of Holland conquered most of Zeeland but it was not until 1289 that Count Floris V was able to subjugate the Frisians in West Friesland (that is, the northern half of North Holland).

=== Expansion and growth ===
Draining of low-lying swampy areas and flood control was expanded significantly after 1200 CE. Before that, towns were built north of the major rivers, Utrecht, Kampen, Deventer, Zwolle, Nijmegen, and Zutphen, but with the expansion of dikes and drainage, cultivable land was created and population expanded. In this period, Holland expanded relative to the other regions. From the thirteenth century onwards, the necessity of controlling water in this northern region was a given, transforming the physical environment, but also requiring institutions and cooperation between areas for water management. Drainage boards (heemraadschappen) were established and the "dike count", took on responsibilities not only for water management issues, but also fiscal, policing, and judicial functions. By the end of the thirteenth century, Holland emerged in the dominant position of the northern region.

The southern Low Countries remained highly populous and developed and were among the most highly urbanized areas in Europe. Because of the east–west flow of the Low Countries' large rivers, they were a military and political barrier between north and south. The southern Low Countries could not exert influence over the north. This division meant that the counts of Holland became politically important in the north. Holland extended its political power over Zeeland.

Guilds were established and markets developed as production exceeded local needs. Also, the introduction of currency made trading a much easier affair than it had been before. Existing towns grew and new towns sprang into existence around monasteries and castles, and a mercantile middle class began to develop in these urban areas. Commerce and town development increased as the population grew.

The Crusades were popular in the Low Countries and drew many to fight in the Holy Land. At home, there was relative peace. Viking pillaging had stopped. Both the Crusades and the relative peace at home contributed to trade and the growth in commerce.

Cities arose and flourished, especially in Flanders and Brabant. As the cities grew in wealth and power, they started to buy certain privileges for themselves from the sovereign, including city rights, the right to self-government and the right to pass laws. In practice, this meant that the wealthiest cities became quasi-independent republics in their own right. Two of the most important cities were Bruges and Antwerp (in Flanders) which would later develop into some of the most important cities and ports in Europe.

=== Hook and Cod Wars ===
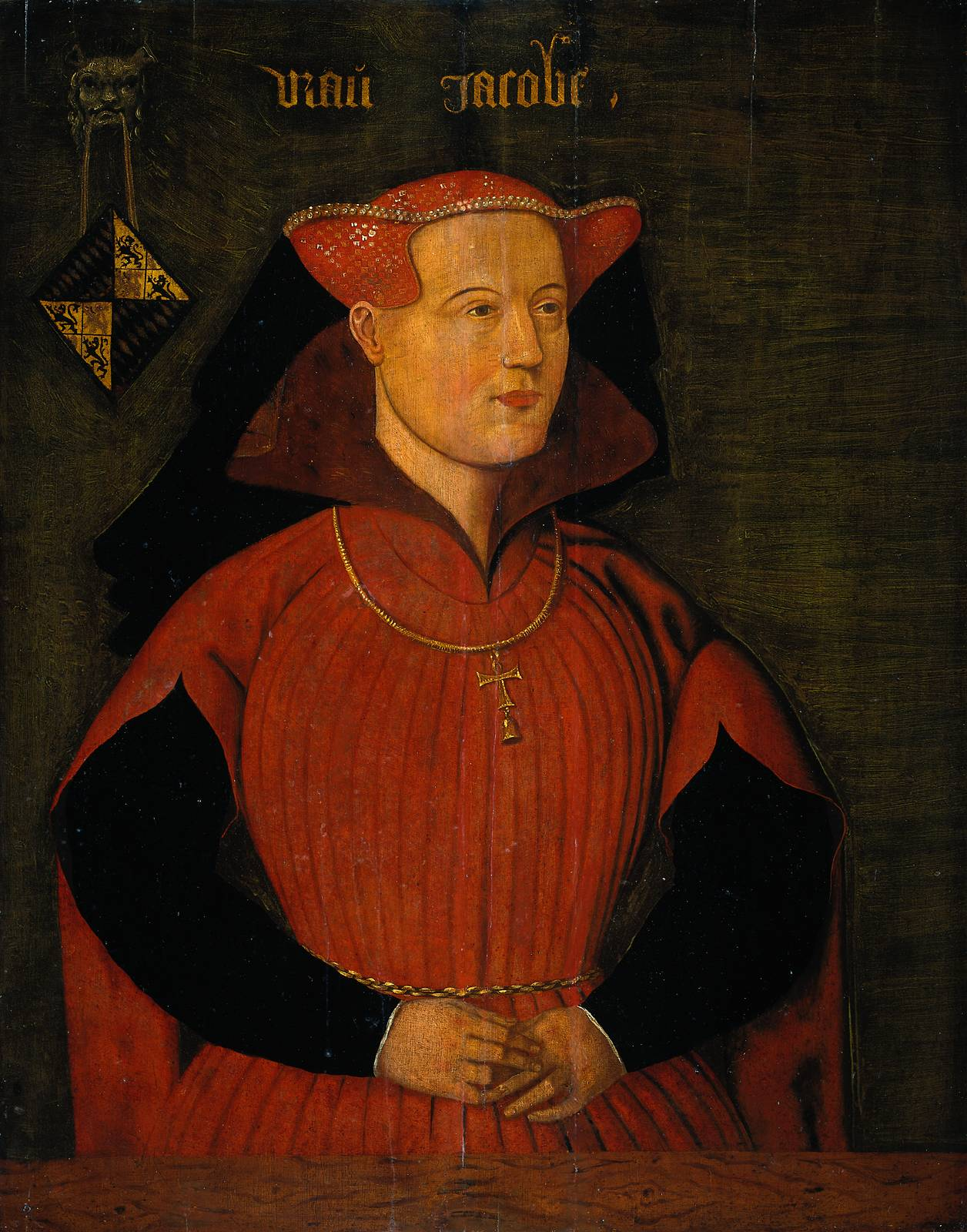
Jacqueline, Countess of Hainaut, 1401–1436, known to the Dutch as "Jacoba of Bavaria"

The Hook and Cod Wars (Dutch: Hoekse en Kabeljauwse twisten) were a series of wars and battles in the County of Holland between 1350 and 1490. Most of these wars were fought over the title of count of Holland, but some have argued that the underlying reason was because of the power struggle of the traders in the cities against the ruling nobility.

The Cod faction generally consisted of the more progressive cities of Holland. The Hook faction consisted for a large part of the conservative noblemen. Some of the main figures in this multi-generational conflict were William IV, Margaret, William V, William VI, Count of Holland and Hainaut, John and Philip the Good, Duke of Burgundy. But perhaps the most well known is Jacqueline, Countess of Hainaut.

The conquest of the county of Holland by the Duke Philip the Good of Burgundy was an odd affair. Leading noblemen in Holland invited the duke to conquer Holland, even though he had no historical claim to it. Some historians say that the ruling class in Holland wanted Holland to integrate with the Flemish economic system and adopt Flemish legal institutions. Europe had been wracked by many civil wars in the 14th and 15th centuries, while Flanders had grown rich and enjoyed peace.

== Burgundian and Habsburg period (1433–1567) ==
The Low Countries in the late 14th century CE

Map illustrating the formation of the Habsburg Netherlands 1482–1543

=== Burgundian period ===
Most of what is now the Netherlands and Belgium was eventually united by the Duke of Burgundy, Phillip the Good (1396–1467). Before the Burgundian union, the Dutch identified themselves by the town they lived in, their local duchy or county or as subjects of the Holy Roman Empire. These collections of fiefs were ruled under the personal union of the House of Valois-Burgundy.

Trade in the region developed rapidly, especially in the areas of shipping and transport. The new rulers defended Dutch trading interests. Amsterdam grew and in the 15th century became the primary trading port in Europe for grain from the Baltic region. Amsterdam distributed grain to the major cities of Belgium, Northern France and England. This trade was vital to the people of the region as they could no longer produce enough grain to feed themselves. Land drainage had caused the peat of the former wetlands to reduce to a level that was too low for drainage to be maintained.

=== Habsburg rule from Spain ===
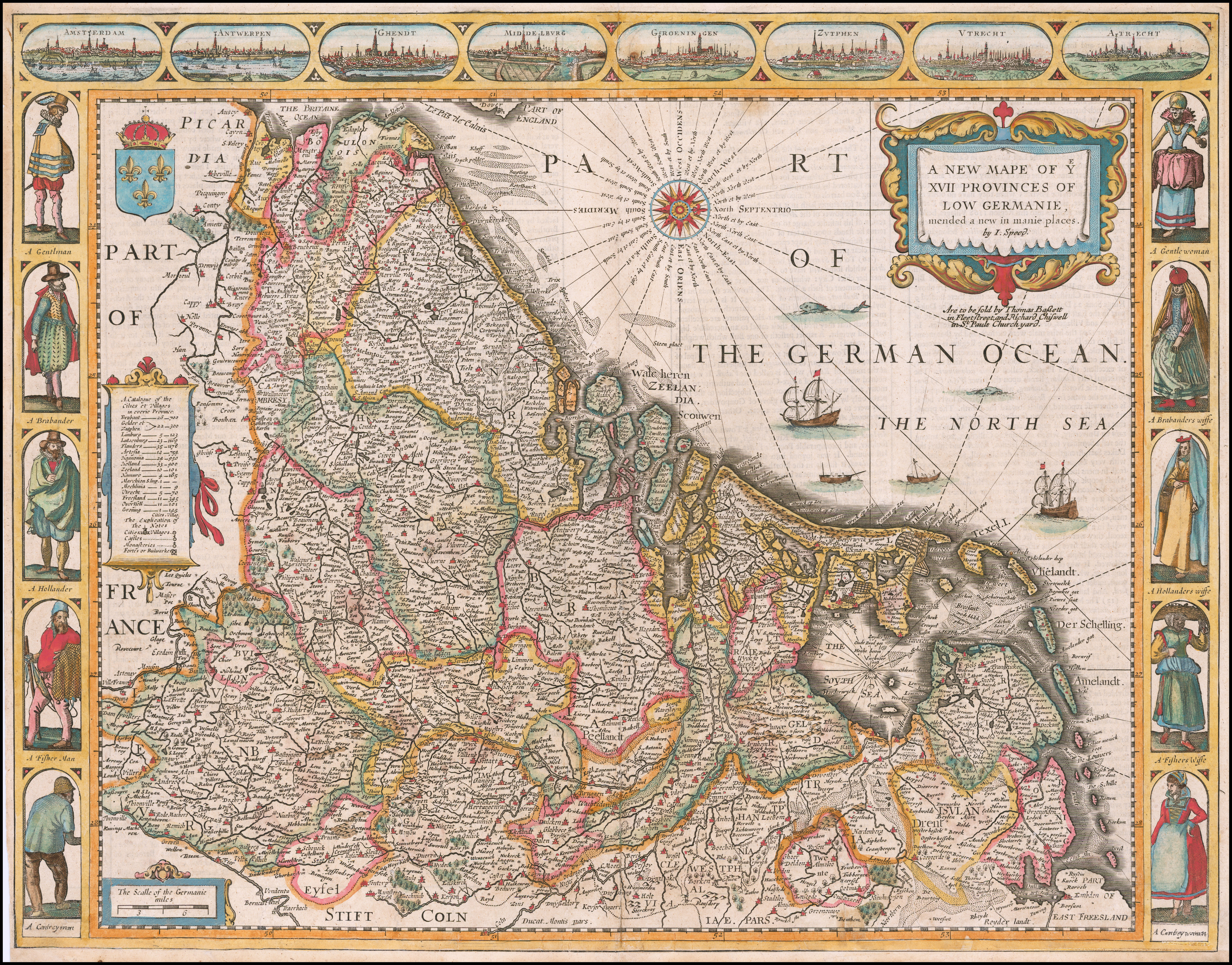
Map of the Seventeen Provinces (Low Germania)

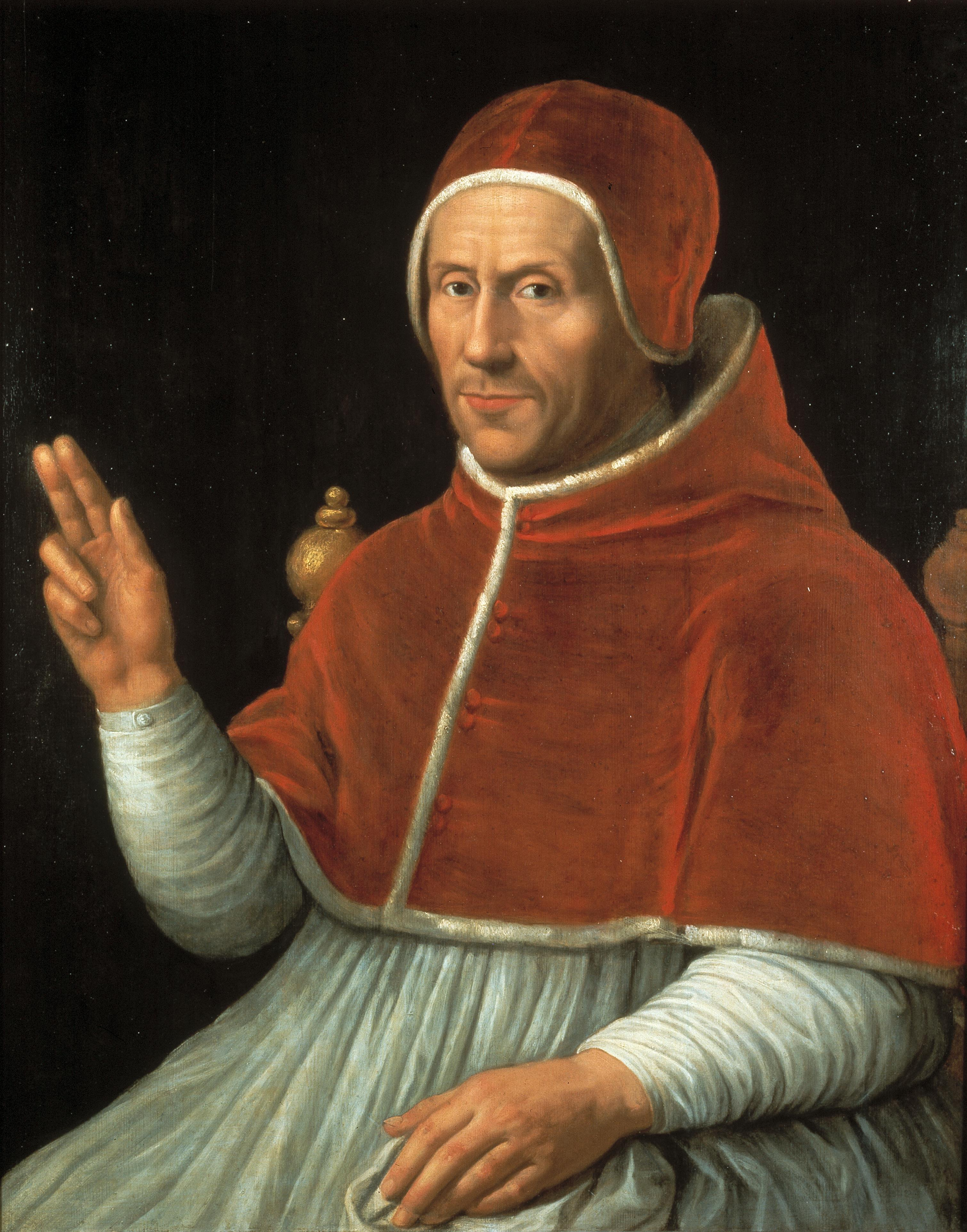
Influential Utrecht theologian Adriaan Florenszoon Boeyens, 1459–1523, was an advisor to Charles; in the last year of his life he became pope as Adrian VI (1522–1523).

Charles V (1500–1558) was born and raised in the Flemish city of Ghent; he spoke French. Charles extended the Burgundian territory with the annexation of Tournai, Artois, Utrecht, Groningen and Guelders to create the Seventeen Provinces. The towns of the region had already been unified by Charles's Burgundian ancestors, but were nominally fiefs of either France or the Holy Roman Empire. When he was a minor, his aunt Margaret acted as regent until 1515. France relinquished its ancient claim on Flanders in 1528.

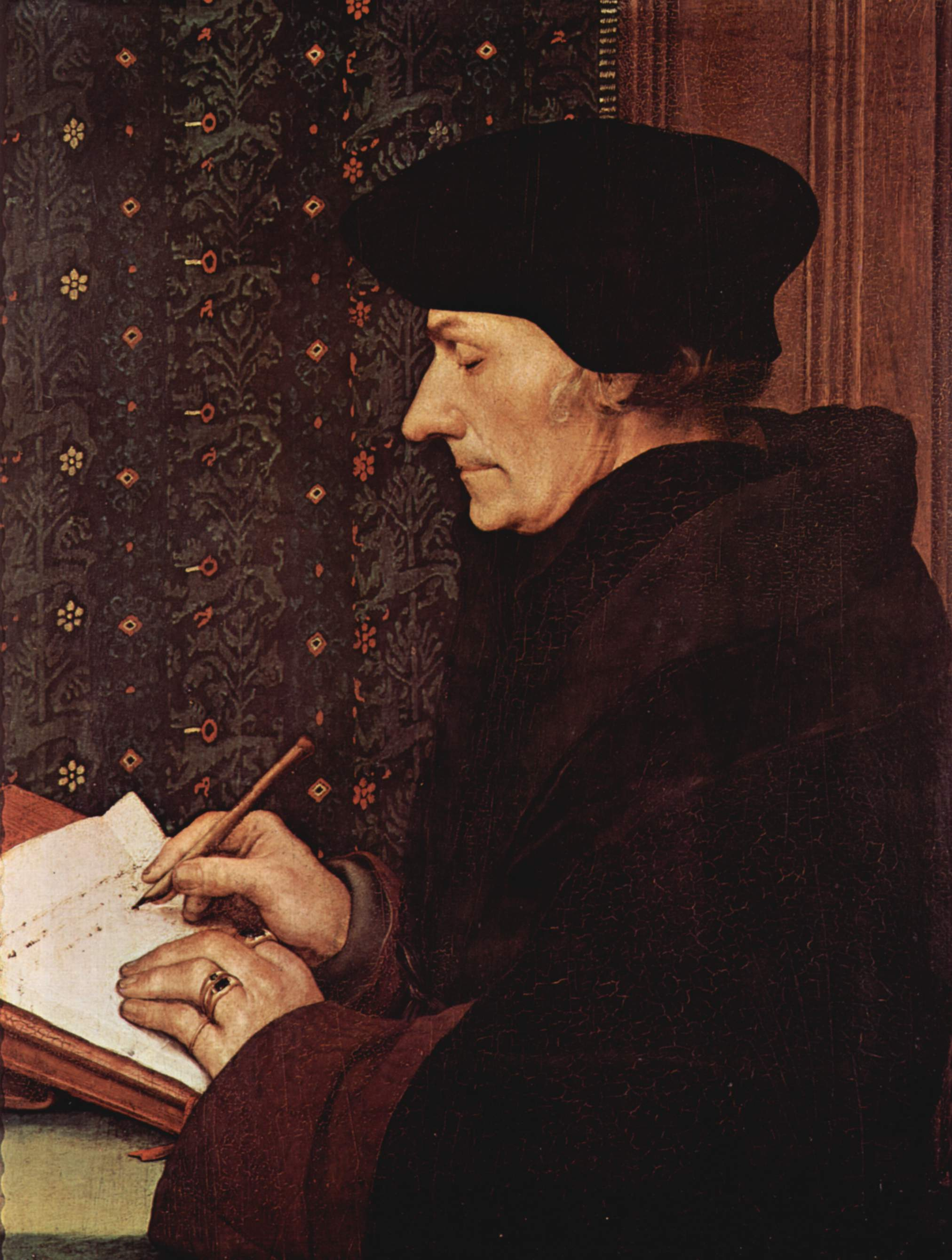
Desiderius Erasmus, 1466–1536, Rotterdam Renaissance humanist, Catholic priest and theologian, by Hans Holbein the Younger, 1523

From 1515 to 1523, Charles's government in the Netherlands had to contend with the rebellion of Frisian peasants (led by Pier Gerlofs Donia and Wijard Jelckama). Gelre attempted to build up its own state in northeast Netherlands and northwest Germany. Lacking funds in the 16th century, Gelre had soldiers provide for themselves by pillaging enemy lands. These soldiers were a great menace to the Habsburg Netherlands, as when they pillaged The Hague.

The dukes of Burgundy over the years through astute marriages, purchases and wars, had taken control of the Seventeen Provinces that made up the Low Countries. They are now the Netherlands in the north, the Southern Netherlands (now Belgium) in the south, and Luxemburg in the southeast. Known as the "Burgundian Circle", these lands came under the control of the Habsburg family.

Charles became the ruler in 1506, but in 1515 he left the territory to become king of Spain and later Holy Roman Emperor. Charles turned over control to regents (his close relatives), and in practice the rule over the Low Countries were exercised by the Spaniards under his authority. The provinces each had their own governments and courts, controlled by the local nobility, and their own traditions and rights ("liberties") dating back centuries. Likewise the numerous cities had their own legal rights and local governments, usually controlled by the merchants. On top of this the Spanish had imposed a somewhat centralized government, the Estates General of the Netherlands, with its own officials and courts. The Spanish officials sent by Charles ignored traditions and the Dutch nobility as well as local officials, inciting an anti-Spanish sense of nationalism which led to the Dutch Revolt. With the emergence of the Protestant Reformation, Charles—now the Emperor—was determined to crush Protestantism. Unrest began in the south, centered in the large rich metropolis of Antwerp. The Netherlands was an especially rich unit of the Spanish realm, especially after the Treaty of Cateau-Cambrésis of 1559; it ended four decades of warfare between France and Spain and allowed Spain to reposition its army.

In 1548, Charles granted the Netherlands status as an entity in which many of the laws of the Holy Roman Empire became obsolete. The "Transaction of Augsburg" created the Burgundian Circle of the Holy Roman Empire, which comprised the Netherlands and Franche-Comté. A year later the Pragmatic Sanction of 1549 stated that the Seventeen Provinces could only be passed on to his heirs as a composite entity.

=== The Reformation ===
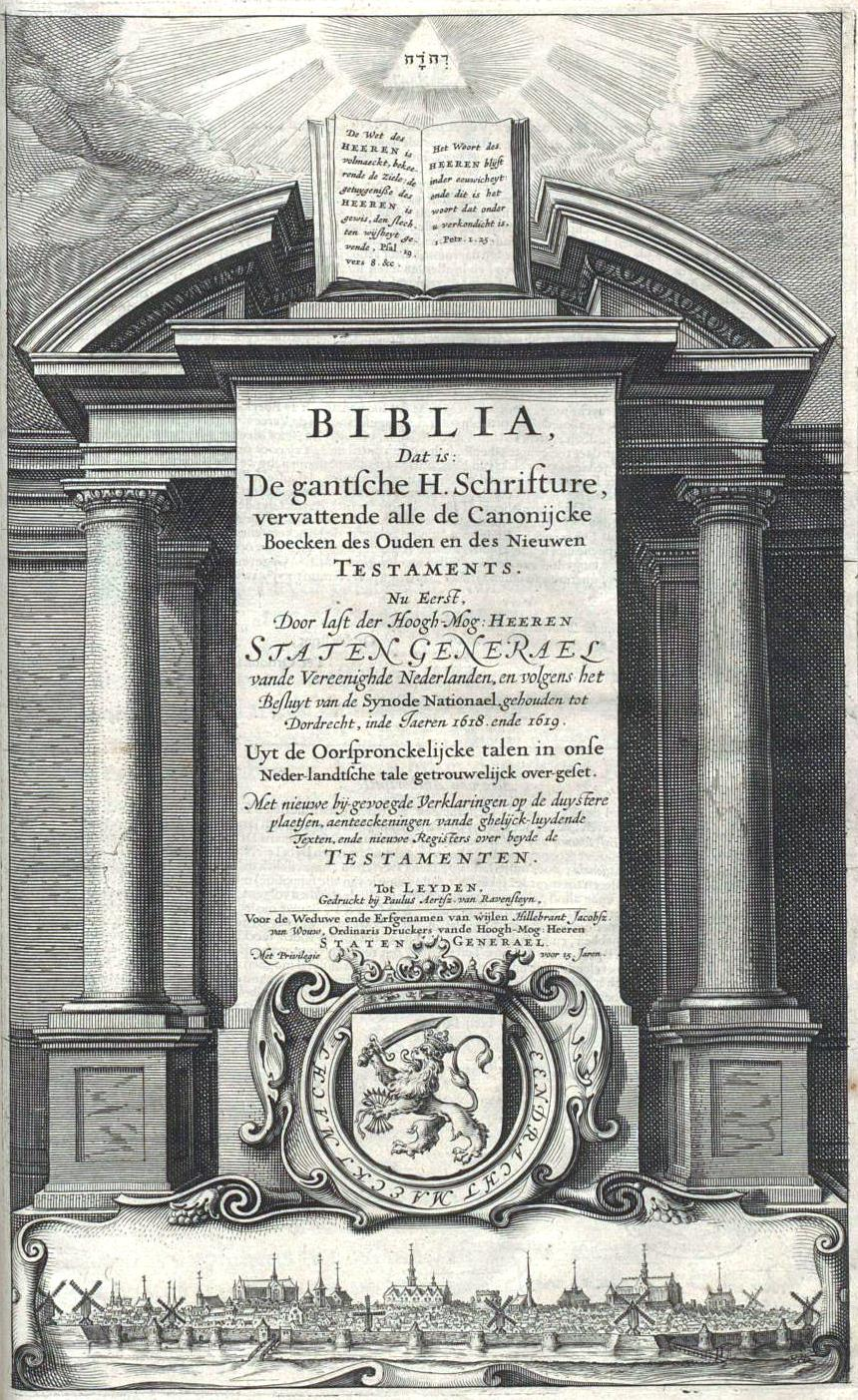
Title page of the 1637 Statenvertaling, the first Bible translated from the original Hebrew and Greek into Dutch, commissioned by the Calvinist Synod of Dort, used well into the 20th century

During the 16th century, the Protestant Reformation rapidly gained ground in northern Europe, especially in its Lutheran and Calvinist forms. Dutch Protestants, after initial repression, were tolerated by local authorities. By the 1560s, the Protestant community had become a significant influence in the Netherlands, although it clearly formed a minority then. In a society dependent on trade, freedom and tolerance were considered essential. Nevertheless, the Catholic rulers Charles V, and later Philip II, made it their mission to defeat Protestantism, which was considered a heresy by the Catholic Church and a threat to the stability of the whole hierarchical political system. On the other hand, the intensely moralistic Dutch Protestants insisted their Biblical theology, sincere piety and humble lifestyle was morally superior to the luxurious habits and superficial religiosity of the ecclesiastical nobility. The rulers' harsh punitive measures led to increasing grievances in the Netherlands, where the local governments had embarked on a course of peaceful coexistence. In the second half of the century, the situation escalated. Philip sent troops to crush the rebellion and make the Netherlands once more a Catholic region.

In the first wave of the Reformation, Lutheranism won over the elites in Antwerp and the South. The Spanish successfully suppressed it there, and Lutheranism only flourished in east Friesland.

The second wave of the Reformation, came in the form of Anabaptism, that was popular among ordinary farmers in Holland and Friesland. Anabaptists were socially very radical and equalitarian; they believed that the apocalypse was very near. They refused to live the old way, and began new communities, creating considerable chaos. A prominent Dutch Anabaptist was Menno Simons, who initiated the Mennonite church. The movement was allowed in the north, but never grew to a large scale.

The third wave of the Reformation, that ultimately proved to be permanent, was Calvinism. It arrived in the Netherlands in the 1540s, attracting both the elite and the common population, especially in Flanders. The Catholic Spanish responded with harsh persecution and introduced the Inquisition of the Netherlands. Calvinists rebelled. First there was the iconoclasm in 1566, which was the systematic destruction of statues of saints and other Catholic devotional depictions in churches. In 1566, William the Silent, a Calvinist, started the Eighty Years' War to liberate all Dutch of whatever religion from Catholic Spain. Blum says, "His patience, tolerance, determination, concern for his people, and belief in government by consent held the Dutch together and kept alive their spirit of revolt." The provinces of Holland and Zeeland, being mainly Calvinist by 1572, submitted to the rule of William. The other states remained almost entirely Catholic.

=== Prelude to war ===
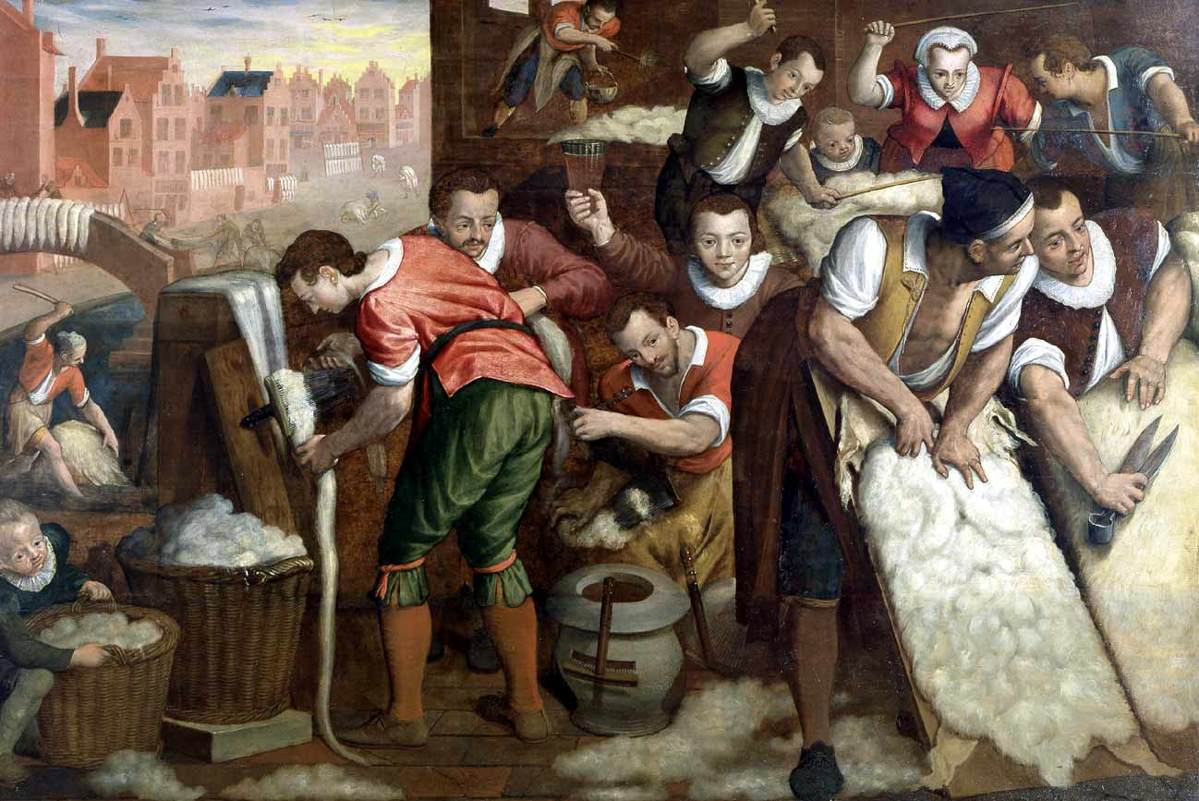
1595 painting by Isaac van Swanenburg illustrating Leiden textile workers.

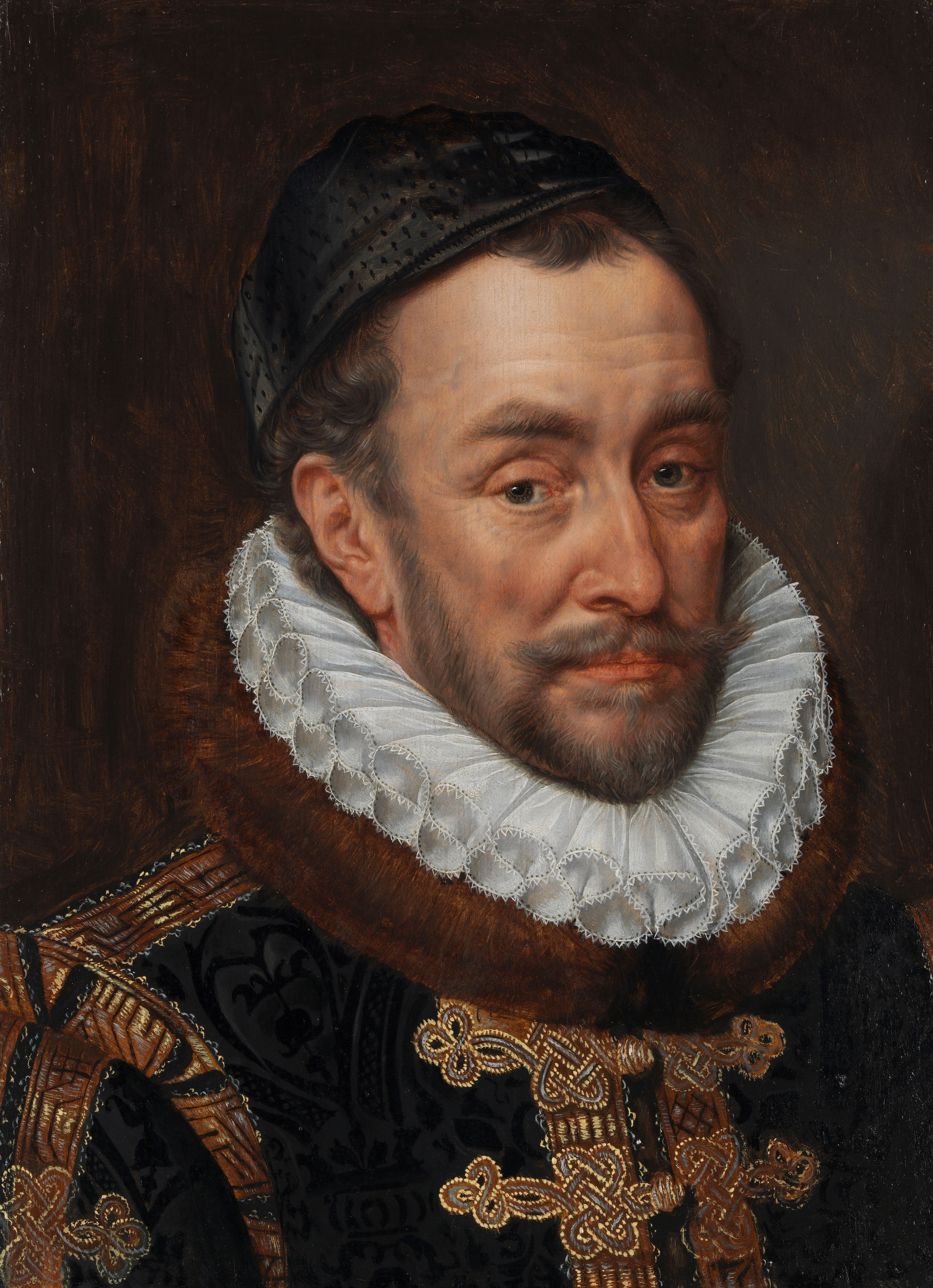
William I, Prince of Orange, called William the Silent.

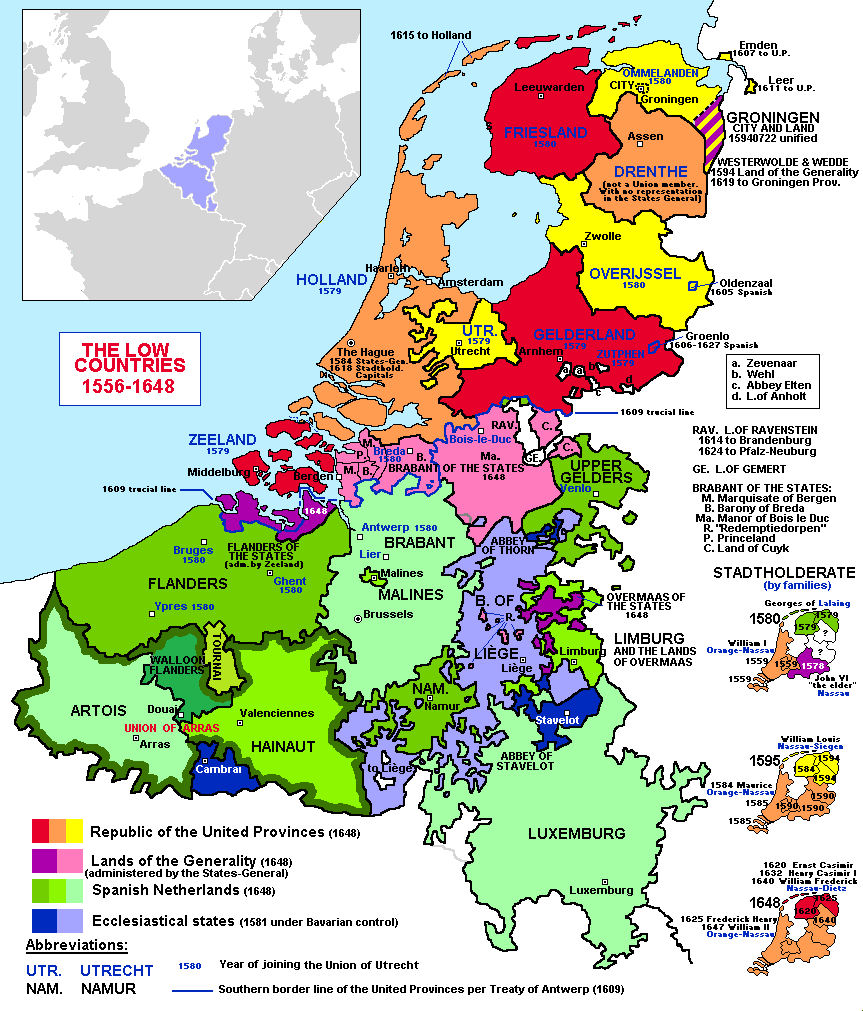
Low countries 1559–1609.

The Netherlands was a valuable part of the Spanish Empire, especially after the Treaty of Cateau-Cambresis of 1559. This treaty ended a forty-year period of warfare between France and Spain conducted in Italy from 1521 to 1559. The Treaty of Cateau-Cambresis was somewhat of a watershed—not only for the battleground that Italy had been, but also for northern Europe. Spain had been keeping troops in the Netherlands to be ready to attack France from the north as well as from the south.

With the settlement of so many major issues between France and Spain by the Treaty of Cateau-Cambresis, there was no longer any reason to keep Spanish troops in the Netherlands. Thus, the people of the Netherlands could get on with their peacetime pursuits. As they did so they found that there was a great deal of demand for their products. Fishing had long been an important part of the economy of the Netherlands. However, now the fishing of herring alone came to occupy 2,000 boats operating out of Dutch ports. Spain, still the Dutch trader's best customer, was buying fifty large ships full of furniture and household utensils from Flanders merchants. Additionally, Dutch woolen goods were desired everywhere. The Netherlands bought and processed enough Spanish wool to sell four million florins of wool products through merchants in Bruges. So strong was the Dutch appetite for raw wool at this time that they bought nearly as much English wool as they did Spanish wool. Total commerce with England alone amounted to 24 million florins. Much of the export going to England resulted in pure profit to the Dutch because the exported items were of their own manufacture. The Netherlands was just starting to enter its "Golden Age." Brabant and Flanders were the richest and most flourishing parts of the Dutch Republic at the time. The Netherlands was one of the richest places in the world. The population reached 3 million in 1560, with 25 cities of 10,000 people or more, by far the largest urban presence in Europe; with the trading and financial center of Antwerp being especially important (population 100,000). Spain could not afford to lose this rich land, nor allow it to fall from Catholic control. Thus came 80 years of warfare.

A devout Catholic, Philip was appalled by the success of the Reformation in the Low Countries, which had led to an increasing number of Calvinists. His attempts to enforce religious persecution of the Protestants, and his centralization of government, law enforcement, and taxes, made him unpopular and led to a revolt. Fernando Alvarez de Toledo, Duke of Alba, was sent with a Spanish Army to punish the unruly Dutch in 1567.

The only opposition the Duke of Alba faced in his march across the Netherlands were the nobles, Lamoral, Count of Egmont; Philippe de Montmorency, Count of Horn and others. With the approach of Alba and the Spanish army, William the Silent of Orange fled to Germany with his three brothers and his whole family on 11 April 1567. The Duke of Alba sought to meet and negotiate with the nobles that now faced him with armies. However, when the nobles arrived in Brussels they were all arrested and Egmont and Horn were executed. Alba then revoked all the prior treaties that Margaret, the Duchess of Parma had signed with the Protestants of the Netherlands and instituted the Inquisition to enforce the decrees of the Council of Trent.

== The Eighty Years' War (1568–1648) ==
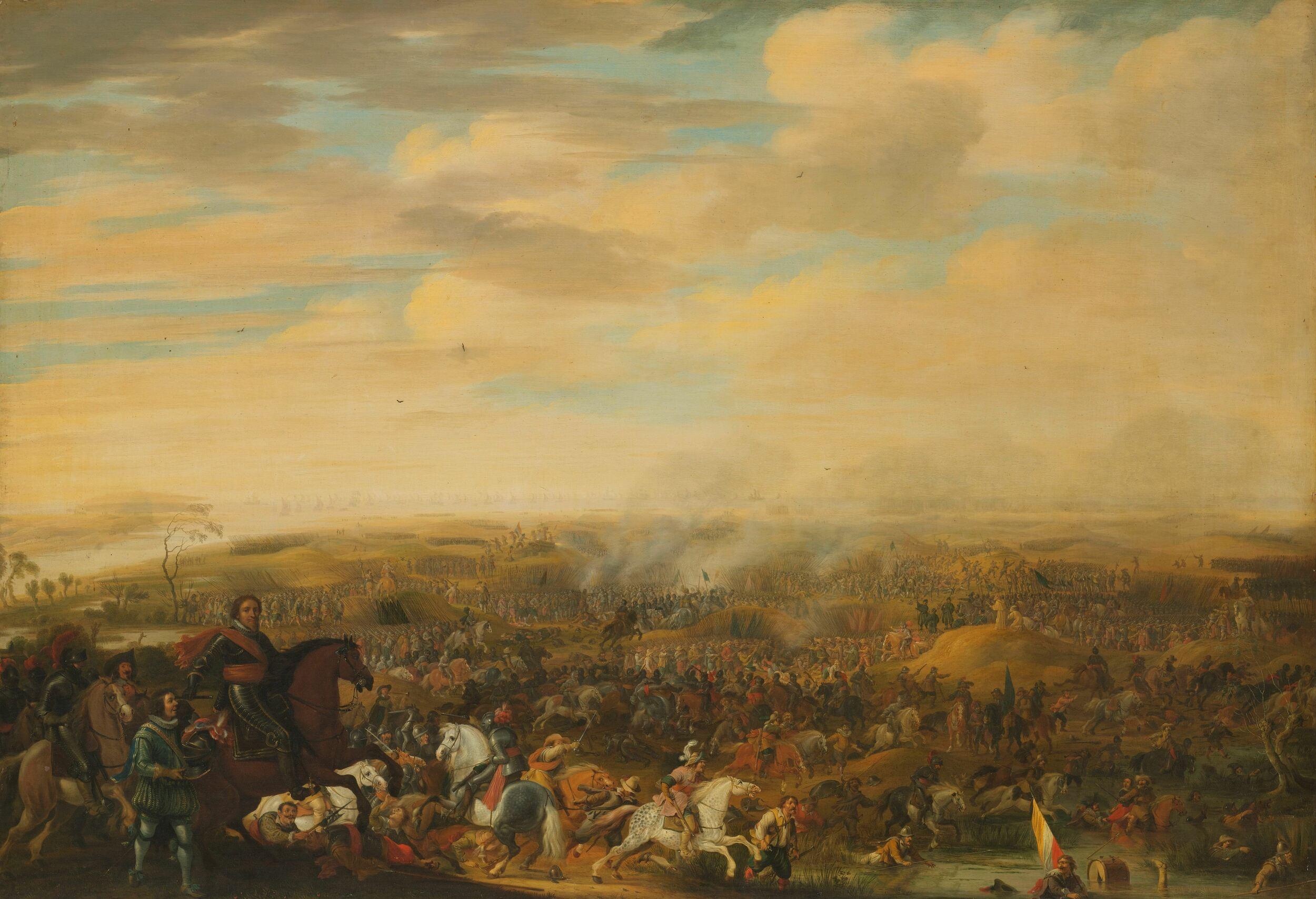
Prince Maurits at the Battle of Nieuwpoort, 1600 CE, by Paulus van Hillegaert

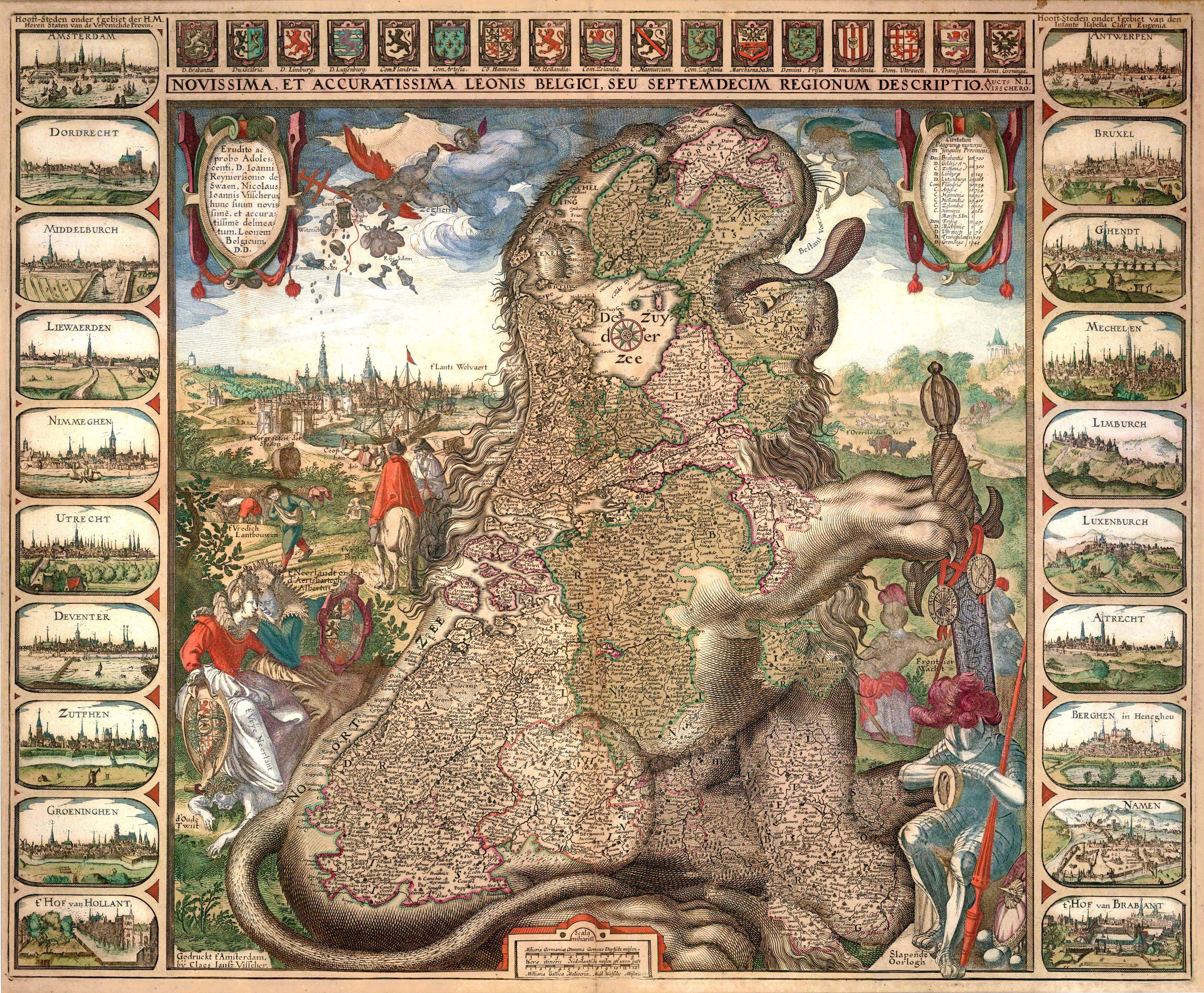
Leo Belgicus, a map of the Low Countries drawn in the shape of a lion, by Claes Jansz. Visscher (II), 1611 CE

The Dutch War for Independence from Spain is frequently called the Eighty Years' War (1568–1648). The first fifty years (1568 through 1618) were a war solely between Catholic Spain and the Protestant rebels of the Netherlands. It was a military conflict with integral religious elements. During the last thirty years (1618–1648) the conflict between Spain and the Netherlands was submerged in the general European War that became known as the Thirty Years' War. The seven rebellious provinces of the Netherlands were eventually united by the Union of Utrecht in 1579 and formed the Republic of the Seven United Netherlands (also known as the "United Provinces"). The Act of Abjuration or Plakkaat van Verlatinghe was signed on 26 July 1581, and was the formal declaration of independence of the northern Low Countries from the Spanish king. Religious toleration was a key element of Protestant ideology.

William of Orange (1533–1584), the founder of the Dutch royal family, led the Dutch during the first part of the war. The very first years were a success for the Spanish troops. However, the Dutch countered subsequent sieges in Holland. In November and December 1572, all the citizens of Zutphen and Naarden were slaughtered by the Spanish. From 11 December that year the city of Haarlem was besieged, holding out for seven months until 13 July 1573. Oudewater was conquered by the Spanish on 7 August 1575, and most of its inhabitants were killed. Maastricht was besieged, sacked and destroyed twice in succession (in 1576 and 1579) by the Spanish.

In a war largely of sieges rather than battles, Governor-General Alexander Farnese proved his mettle. His strategy was to offer generous terms for the surrender of a city: there would be no more massacres or looting; historic urban privileges were retained; there was a full pardon and amnesty; return to the Catholic Church would be gradual. Conservative Catholics in the south and east supported the Spanish. Farnese recaptured Antwerp and nearly all of what became Belgium. Most of the Dutch-speaking territory in the Netherlands was taken from Spain, but not in Flanders, which to this day remains part of Belgium. Flanders was the most radical anti-Spanish territory. Many Flemish fled to Holland, among them half of the population of Antwerp, 3/4 of Bruges and Ghent and the entire population of Nieuwpoort, Dunkerque and countryside. His successful campaign gave the Catholics control of the lower half of the Low Countries, and was part of the Catholic Counter-Reformation.

The war dragged on for another half century, but the main fighting was over. The Peace of Westphalia, signed in 1648, confirmed the independence of the United Provinces from Spain. The Dutch people started to develop a national identity, beginning in the 15th century, but they officially remained a part of the Holy Roman Empire until 1648. National identity was mainly formed by the province people came from. Holland was the most important province by far.

The Catholics in the Netherlands were an outlawed minority that had been suppressed by the Calvinists. After 1572, however, they made a striking comeback (also as part of the Catholic Counter-Reformation), setting up seminaries, reforming their Church, and sending missionaries into Protestant districts. Laity often took the lead; the Calvinist government often arrested or harassed priests who seemed too effective. Catholic numbers stabilized at about a third of the population in the Netherlands; they were strongest in the southeast.

== Golden Age ==
Johannes Vermeer's Girl with a Pearl Earring

The Dutch Golden Age was a period which roughly lasted from 1588, when the Dutch Republic was established, to 1672, when the Rampjaar occurred. During this period, Dutch trade, scientific developments, art and overseas colonisation was among the most prominent in Europe. The first half of the period spanned from the beginning of the Eighty Years' War until its conclusion in 1648, with the second half lasting until the outbreak of the Franco-Dutch War. During the period, Dutch colonialists, many of them affiliated with the East India Company and West India Company, established trading posts and colonies in the Americas, Southern Africa and Asia, protected by the powerful Dutch States Navy. The Dutch dominated the triangular trade and Atlantic slave trade.

Dutch culture experienced a renaissance. However, by the end of the 17th century, conflicts with neighbouring powers as well as a declining economic influence led to waning of Dutch power. The process by which the Dutch Republic became one of the foremost maritime and economic powers of the world during the era has been referred to as the "Dutch Miracle" by historian K. W. Swart. The term "Dutch Golden Age" has been controversial in the 21st century due to the extensive Dutch involvement in slavery and colonialism during the period, and it has been deprecated by several museums in the Netherlands, including the Amsterdam Museum.

== Dutch Empire ==
=== The Dutch in the Americas ===
The Dutch West India Company was a chartered company (known as the "GWC") of Dutch merchants. On 2 June 1621, it was granted a charter for a trade monopoly in the West Indies (meaning the Caribbean) by the Republic of the Seven United Netherlands and given jurisdiction over the African slave trade, Brazil, the Caribbean, and North America. Its area of operations stretched from West Africa to the Americas, and the Pacific islands. The company became instrumental in the Dutch colonization of the Americas. The first forts and settlements in Guyana and on the Amazon River date from the 1590s. Actual colonization, with Dutch settling in the new lands, was not as common as with England and France. Many of the Dutch settlements were lost or abandoned by the end of that century, but the Netherlands managed to retain possession of Suriname and a number of Dutch Caribbean islands.

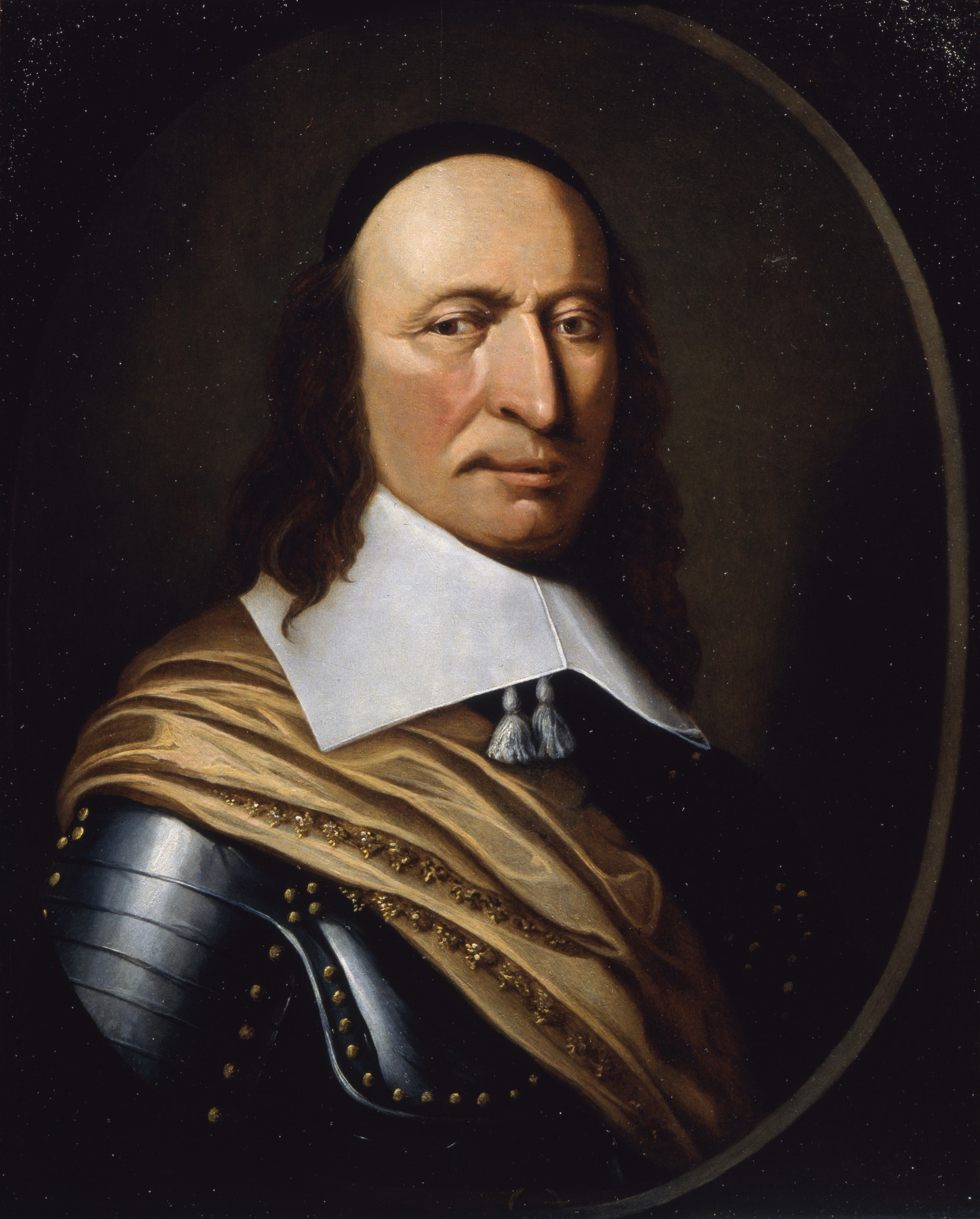
Peter Stuyvesant, Director-General of New Netherland (New York). His provincial capital, New Amsterdam, was located at the southern tip of the island of Manhattan.

The colony was a private business venture to exploit the fur trade in beaver pelts. New Netherland was slowly settled during its first decades, partially as a result of policy mismanagement by the Dutch West India Company (WIC), and conflicts with Native Americans. During the 1650s, the colony experienced dramatic growth and became a major port for trade in the Atlantic World, tolerating a highly diverse ethnic mix. The surrender of Fort Amsterdam to the British control in 1664 was formalized in 1667, contributing to the Second Anglo–Dutch War. In 1673 the Dutch re-took the area, but later relinquished it under the 5 April 1674 Treaty of Westminster ending the Third Anglo-Dutch War.

Descendants of the original settlers played a prominent role in the history of the United States, as typified by the Roosevelt and Vanderbilt families. The Hudson Valley still boasts a Dutch heritage. The concepts of civil liberties and pluralism introduced in the province became mainstays of American political and social life.

=== Slave trade ===
Although slavery was illegal inside the Netherlands it flourished in the Dutch Empire, and helped support the economy. In 1619 The Netherlands took the lead in building large-scale slave trading between Africa and Virginia, by 1650 becoming the pre-eminent slave trading country in Europe. It was overtaken by Britain around 1700. Historians agree that in all the Dutch shipped about 550,000 African slaves across the Atlantic, about 75,000 of whom died on board before reaching their destinations. From 1596 to 1829, the Dutch traders sold 250,000 slaves in the Dutch Guianas, 142,000 in the Dutch Caribbean islands, and 28,000 in Dutch Brazil. In addition, tens of thousands of slaves, mostly from India and some from Africa, were carried to the Dutch East Indies and slaves from the East Indies to Africa and the West Indies.

=== The Dutch in Asia: The Dutch East India Company ===
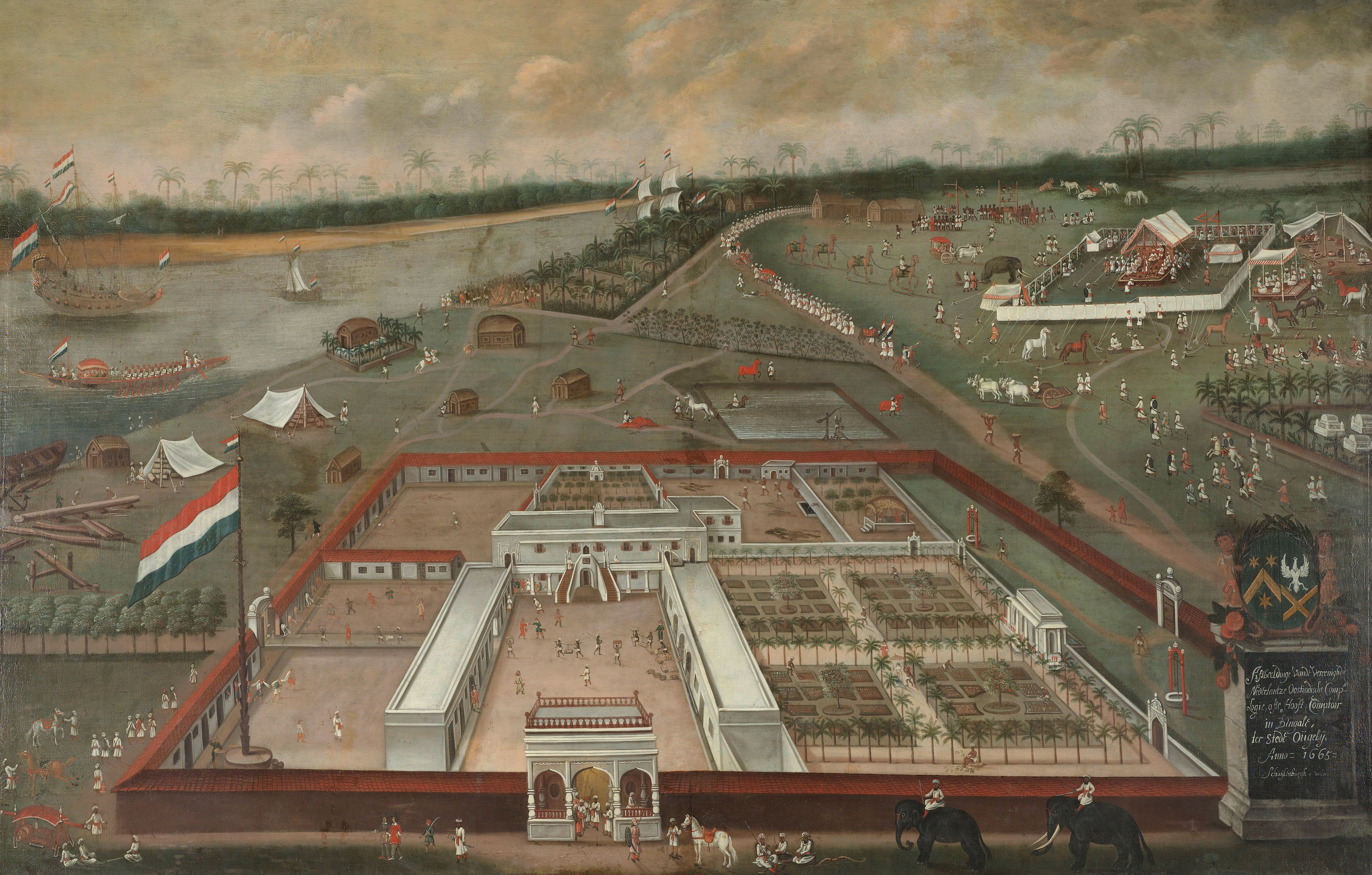
Dutch East India Company factory in Hugli-Chuchura, Mughal Bengal. Hendrik van Schuylenburgh, 1665

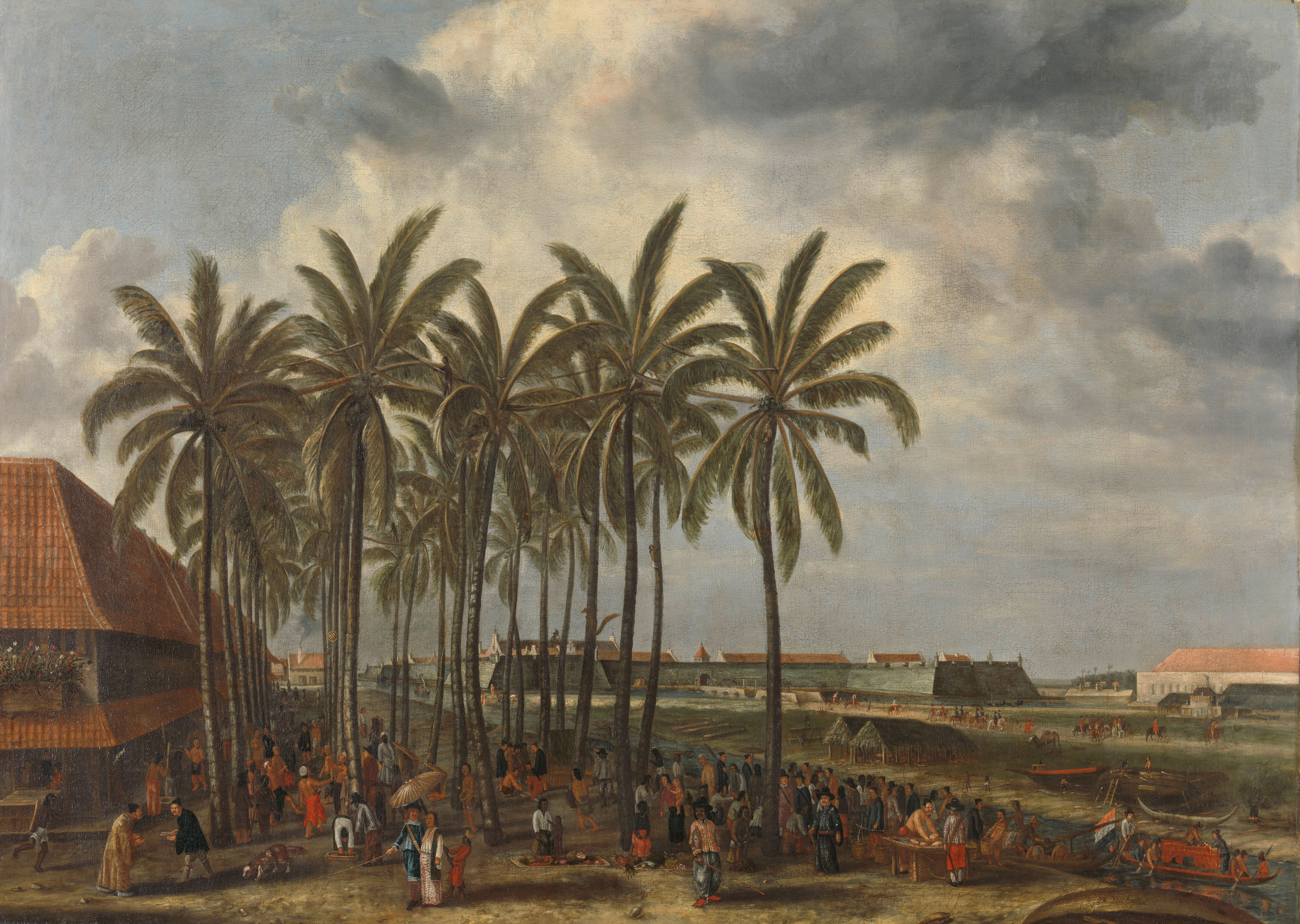
Dutch Batavia built in what is now Jakarta, by Andries Beeckman c. 1656 CE

The Dutch East India Company (also called the VOC) emerged in 1602, when the government gave it a monopoly to trade with Asia, mainly to Mughal India. It had many world firsts—the first multinational corporation, the first company to issue stock, and the first megacorporation, possessing quasi-governmental powers, including the ability to wage war, negotiate treaties, coin money, and establish colonial settlements.

Between 1602 and 1796 the VOC sent almost a million Europeans to work in the Asia trade on 4,785 ships. It returned over 2.5 million tons of Asian trade goods. The VOC enjoyed huge profits from its spice monopoly through most of the 17th century. The VOC was active chiefly in the Dutch East Indies, now Indonesia, where its base was Batavia (now Jakarta), which remained an important trading concern and paid an 18% annual dividend for almost 200 years; colonized parts of Taiwan between 1624–1662 and 1664–1667 and was the only western trading post in Japan, Dejima.

During the period of proto-industrialization, the Dutch received 50% of their textile imports and 80% of their silk imports from the Mughal Empire, chiefly from its most developed region known as the Bengal Subah.

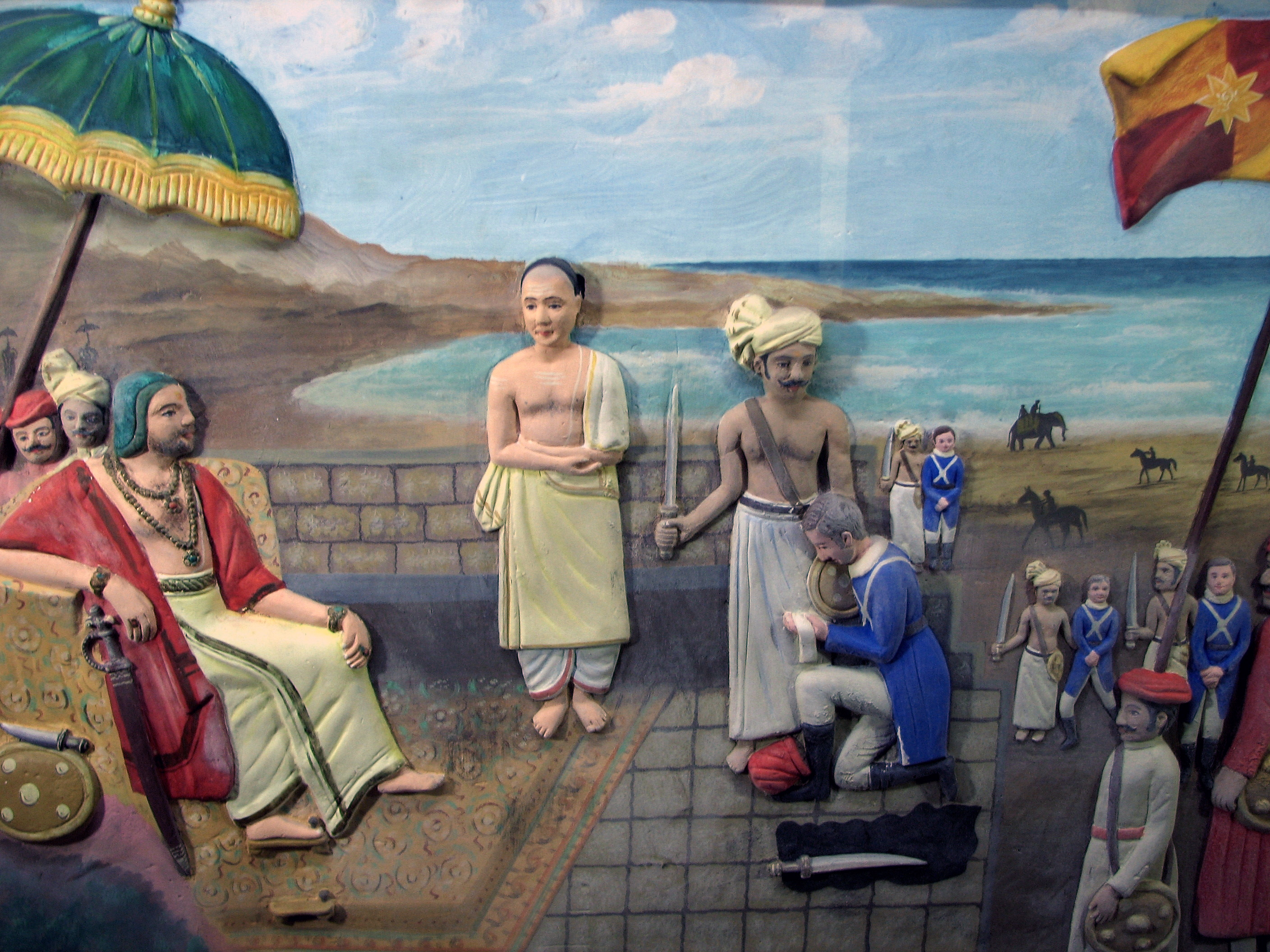
Eustachius De Lannoy of the Dutch East India Company surrenders to Maharaja Marthanda Varma of the Indian Kingdom of Travancore after the Battle of Colachel. (Depiction at Padmanabhapuram Palace)

By the 17th century, the Dutch East India Company established their base in parts of Ceylon (modern-day Sri Lanka). Afterward, they established ports in Dutch occupied Malabar, leading to Dutch settlements and trading posts in India. However, their expansion into India was halted, after their defeat in the Battle of Colachel by the Kingdom of Travancore, during the Travancore-Dutch War. The Dutch never recovered from the defeat and no longer posed a large colonial threat to India.

Eventually, the 18th century saw the Dutch East India Company weighed down by corruption, and the VOC eventually went bankrupt in 1800. Its possessions were taken over by the government and turned into the Dutch East Indies.

=== The Dutch in Africa ===
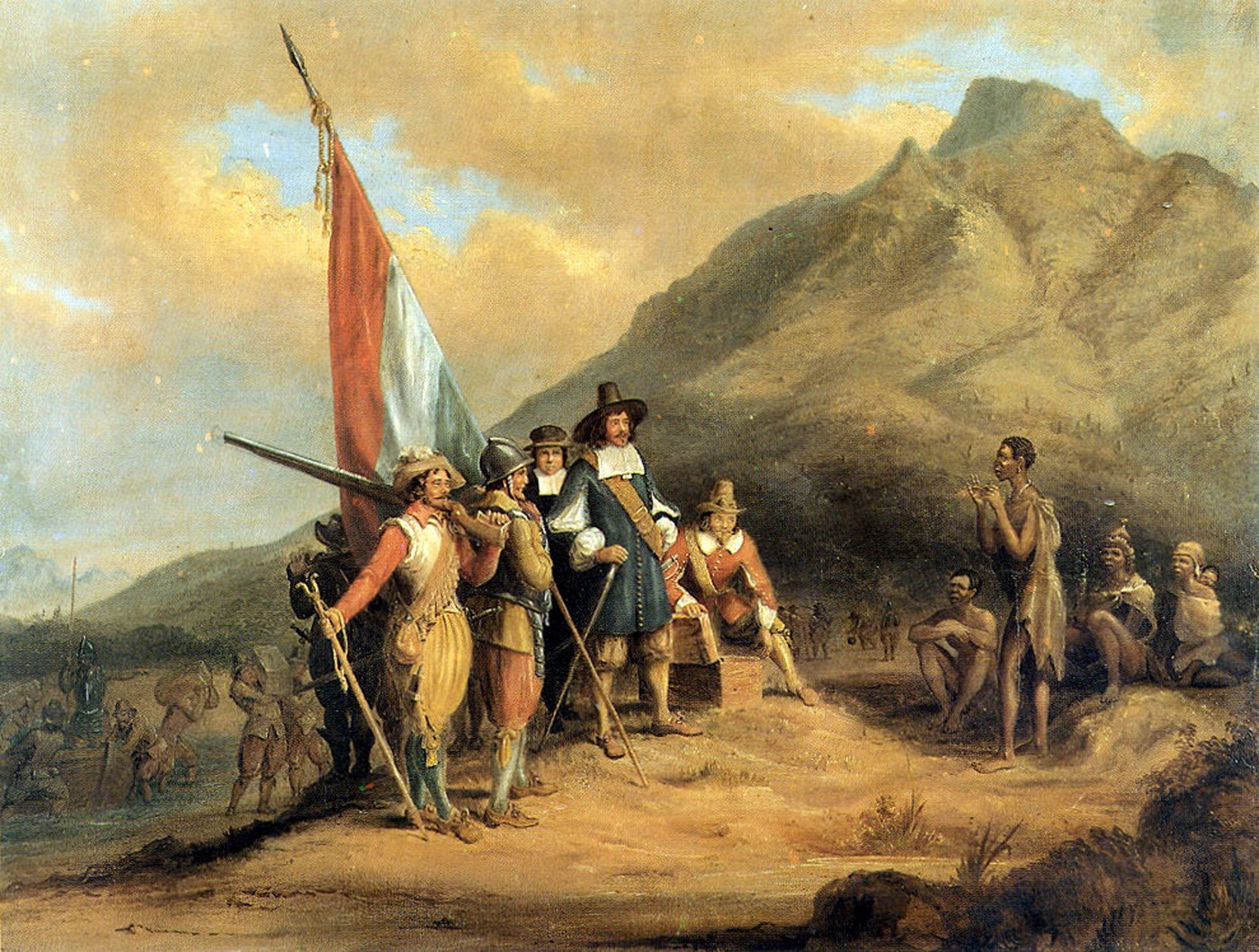
Painting of an account of the arrival of Jan van Riebeeck, by Charles Bell

In 1647, a Dutch vessel was wrecked in the present-day Table Bay at Cape Town. The marooned crew, the first Europeans to attempt settlement in the area, built a fort and stayed for a year until they were rescued. Shortly thereafter, the Dutch East India Company (in the Dutch of the day: Vereenigde Oostindische Compagnie, or VOC) decided to establish a permanent settlement. The VOC, one of the major European trading houses sailing the spice route to East Asia, had no intention of colonizing the area, instead wanting only to establish a secure base camp where passing ships could shelter, and where hungry sailors could stock up on fresh supplies of meat, fruit, and vegetables. To this end, a small VOC expedition under the command of Jan van Riebeeck reached Table Bay on 6 April 1652.

To remedy a labour shortage, the VOC released a small number of VOC employees from their contracts and permitted them to establish farms with which they would supply the VOC settlement from their harvests. This arrangement proved highly successful, producing abundant supplies of fruit, vegetables, wheat, and wine; they also later raised livestock. The small initial group of "free burghers", as these farmers were known, steadily increased in number and began to expand their farms further north and east.

The majority of burghers had Dutch ancestry and belonged to the Calvinist Reformed Church of the Netherlands, but there were also numerous Germans as well as some Scandinavians. In 1688 the Dutch and the Germans were joined by French Huguenots, also Calvinists, who were fleeing religious persecution in France under King Louis XIV. The Huguenots in South Africa were absorbed into the Dutch population but they played a prominent role in South Africa's history.

From the beginning, the VOC used the cape as a place to supply ships travelling between the Netherlands and the Dutch East Indies. There was a close association between the cape and these Dutch possessions in the far east. Van Riebeeck and the VOC began to import large numbers of slaves, primarily from Madagascar and Indonesia. These slaves often married Dutch settlers, and their descendants became known as the Cape Coloureds and the Cape Malays.

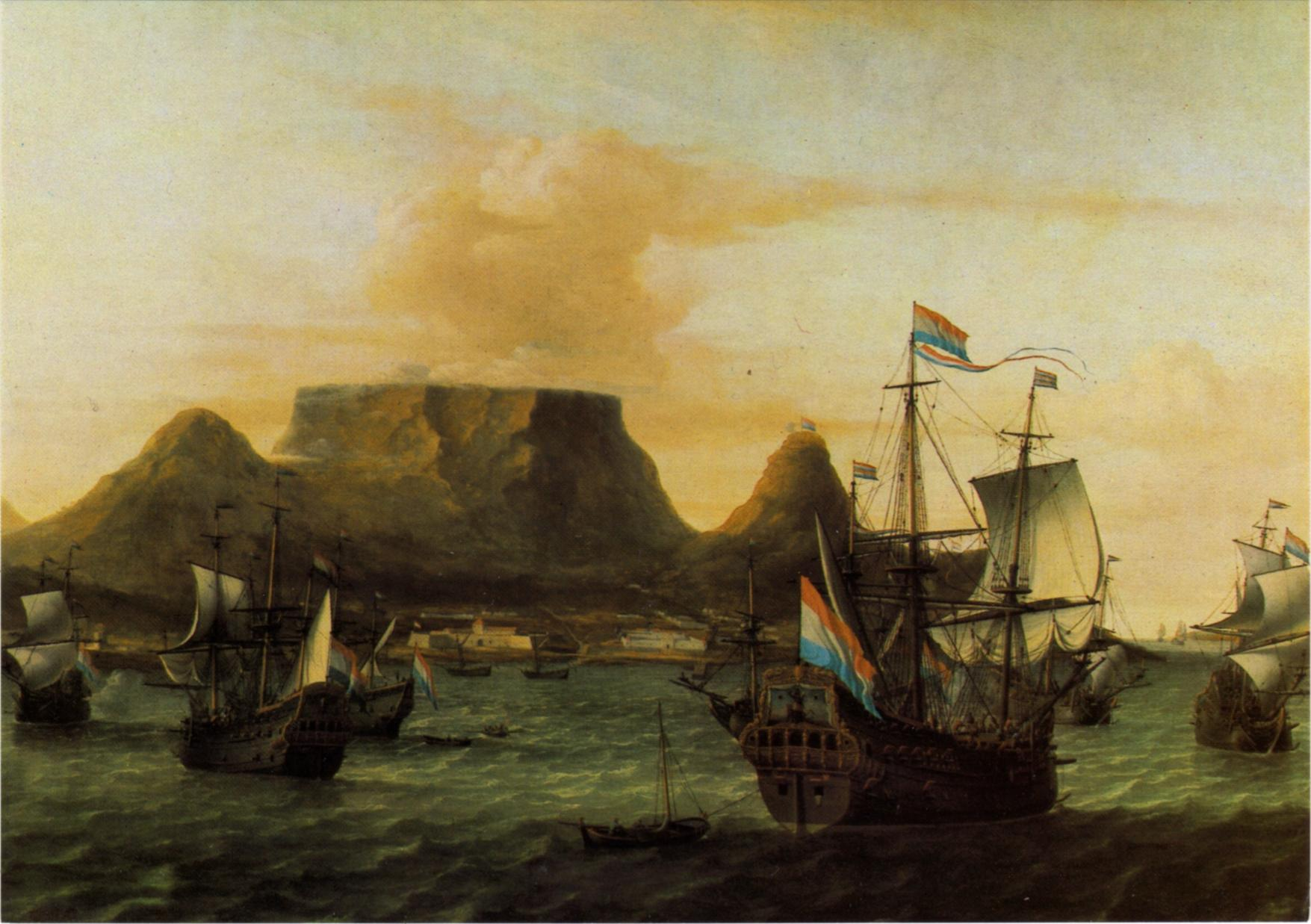
De Tafelbaai by Aernout Smit, 1683

During the 18th century, the Dutch settlement in the area of the cape grew and prospered. By the late 1700s, the Cape Colony was one of the best developed European settlements outside Europe or the Americas. The two bases of the Cape Colony's economy for almost the entirety of its history were shipping and agriculture. Its strategic position meant that almost every ship sailing between Europe and Asia stopped off at the colony's capital Cape Town. The supplying of these ships with fresh provisions, fruit, and wine provided a very large market for the surplus produce of the colony.

Some free burghers continued to expand into the rugged hinterlands of the north and east, many began to take up a semi-nomadic pastoralist lifestyle, in some ways not far removed from that of the Khoikhoi they had displaced. In addition to its herds, a family might have a wagon, a tent, a Bible, and a few guns. As they became more settled, they would build a mud-walled cottage, frequently located, by choice, days of travel from the nearest European settlement. These were the first of the Trekboers (Wandering Farmers, later shortened to Boers), completely independent of official controls, extraordinarily self-sufficient, and isolated from the government and the main settlement in Cape Town.

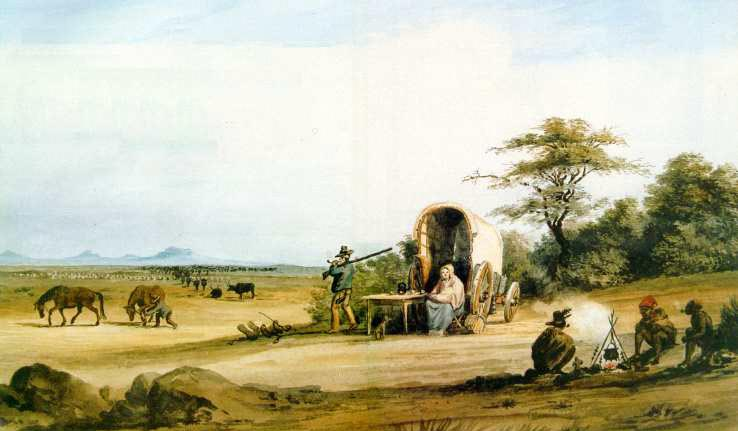
An account of the first trekboers

Dutch was the official language, but a dialect had formed that was quite distinct from Dutch. The Afrikaans language originated mainly from 17th-century Dutch dialects.

This Dutch dialect sometimes referred to as the "kitchen language" (kombuistaal), would eventually in the late 19th century be recognised as a distinct language called Afrikaans and replace Dutch as the official language of the Afrikaners.

As the 18th century drew to a close, Dutch mercantile power began to fade and the British moved in to fill the vacuum. They seized the Cape Colony in 1795 to prevent it from falling into French hands, then briefly relinquished it back to the Dutch (1803), before definitively conquering it in 1806. British sovereignty of the area was recognised at the Congress of Vienna in 1815. By the time the Dutch colony was seized by the British in 1806, it had grown into an established settlement with 25,000 slaves, 20,000 white colonists, 15,000 Khoisan, and 1,000 freed black slaves. Outside Cape Town and the immediate hinterland, isolated black and white pastoralists populated the country.

Dutch interest in South Africa was based chiefly on the strategically located VOC port. Yet in the 17th and 18th centuries the Dutch created the foundation of the modern state of South Africa. The Dutch legacy in South Africa is evident everywhere, but particularly in the Afrikaner people and the Afrikaans language.

== Dutch Republic: Regents and Stadholders (1649–1794) ==
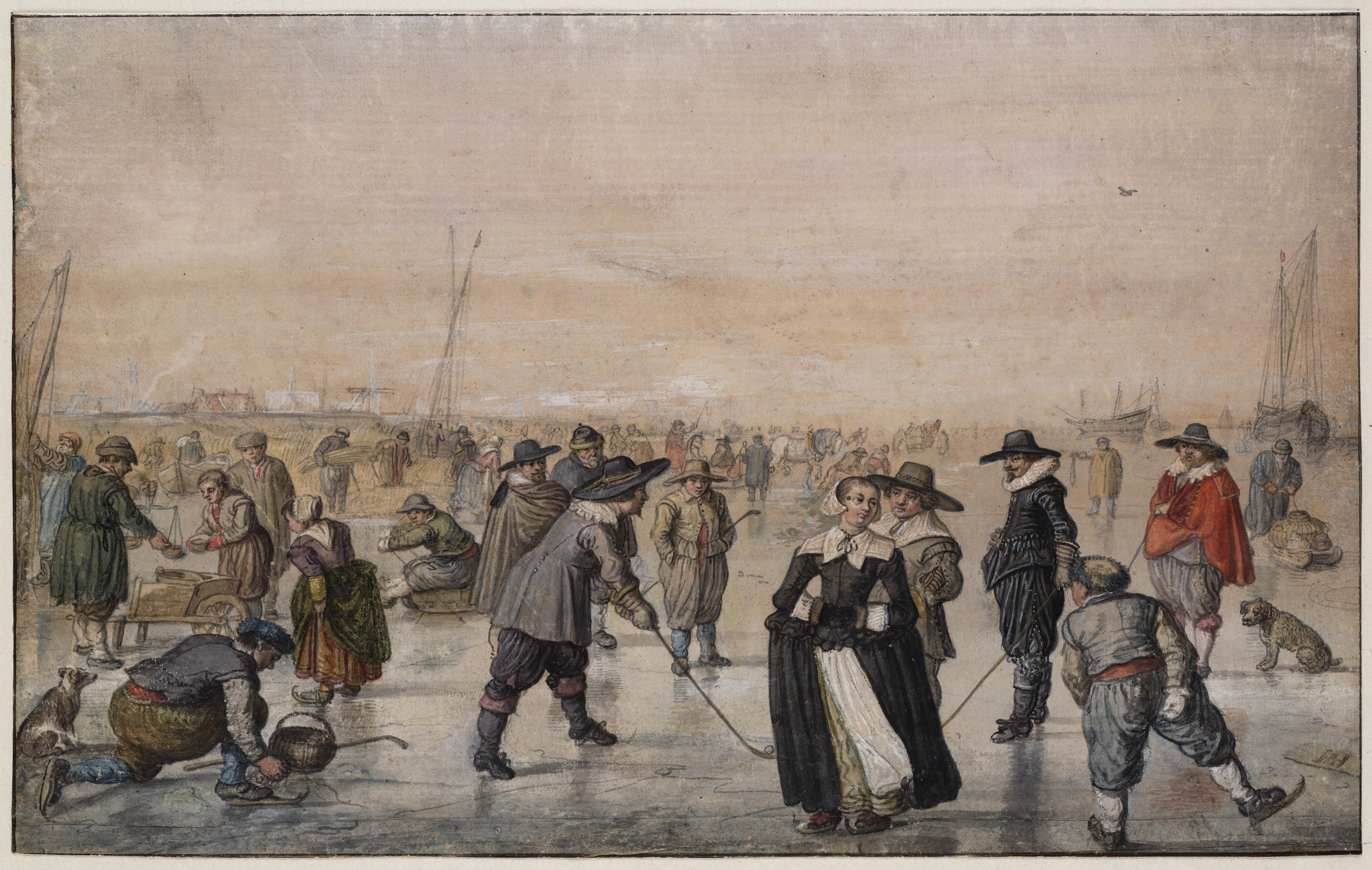
Skating fun, a traditional rural scene by 17th-century Dutch painter Hendrick Avercamp

The United Provinces of the Netherlands, commonly referred to in historiography as the Dutch Republic, was a confederation of provinces that existed from 1579 until the Batavian Revolution in 1795. It was the first independent Dutch state. The republic was established after seven Dutch provinces revolted against Spanish rule, declaring their independence in 1581. As the Netherlands was a republic, it was largely governed by an aristocracy of city-merchants called the regents, rather than by a king. Every city and province had its own government and laws, and a large degree of autonomy. After attempts to find a competent sovereign proved unsuccessful, it was decided that sovereignty would be vested in the various provincial Estates, the governing bodies of the provinces. The Estates-General, with its representatives from all the provinces, would decide on matters important to the Republic as a whole. Each province was led by an official known as the stadtholder (Dutch for 'steward'); this office was nominally open to anyone, but most provinces appointed a member of the House of Orange. The position gradually became hereditary, with the Prince of Orange simultaneously holding most or all of the stadtholderships, making him effectively the head of state. This created tension between political factions: the Orangists favoured a powerful stadtholder, while the Republicans favoured a strong States General. The Republicans forced two Stadtholderless Periods, 1650–1672 and 1702–1747, with the latter causing national instability and the end of Great Power status. In the Peace of Westphalia (1648) the republic gained approximately 20% more territory, located outside the member provinces, which was ruled directly by the States General as Generality Lands.

Although the state was small and had only around 1.5 million inhabitants, it controlled a worldwide network of seafaring trade routes, with a merchant fleet initially larger than those of England and France combined. Through its trading companies, the Dutch East India Company (VOC) and the Dutch West India Company (GWC), it established an empire. These companies were based on the English model and the success of England's joint-stock enterprises and trading guilds.

The income from this trade allowed the Dutch Republic to compete militarily against much larger countries. Major conflicts were fought in the Eighty Years' War against Spain, the Dutch–Portuguese War (1602–1663), four Anglo-Dutch Wars, the Franco-Dutch War (1672–1678), War of the Grand Alliance (1688–1697), the War of the Spanish Succession (1702–1713), the War of Austrian Succession (1744–1748), and the War of the First Coalition (1792–1795) against the Kingdom of France.

The republic was more tolerant of different religions and ideas than contemporary states, allowing freedom of thought to its residents. Artists flourished under this regime, including painters such as Rembrandt. So did scientists, such as Hugo Grotius, Christiaan Huygens and Antonie van Leeuwenhoek. Dutch trade, science, armed forces, and art were among the most acclaimed in the world during much of the 17th century, a period which became known as the Dutch Golden Age.

The economy, based on Amsterdam's role as the center of world trade, was strong in the 17th century. In 1670 the Dutch merchant marine totalled 568,000 tons of shipping—about half the European total. The province of Holland was highly commercial and dominated the country. Its nobility had little influence, for it was numerically small, politically weak, and formed a strictly closed caste. Most land in the province of Holland was commercialized for cash crops and was owned by urban capitalists, not nobles; there were few links between Holland's nobility and the merchants. By 1650 the burgher families which had grown wealthy through commerce and become influential in government controlled the province of Holland, and to a large extent shaped national policies. The other six provinces were more rural and traditional in life style, had an active nobility, and played a small role in commerce and national politics. Instead they concentrated on their flood protections and land reclamation projects.

Economic decline led to a period of political instability known as the Patriottentijd (1780–1787). This unrest was temporarily suppressed by a Prussian invasion in support of the stadtholder. The French Revolution and subsequent War of the First Coalition reignited these tensions. Following military defeat by France, the stadtholder was expelled in the Batavian Revolution of 1795, ending the Dutch Republic, which was succeeded by the Batavian Republic.

== Batavian Republic (1795–1806) ==
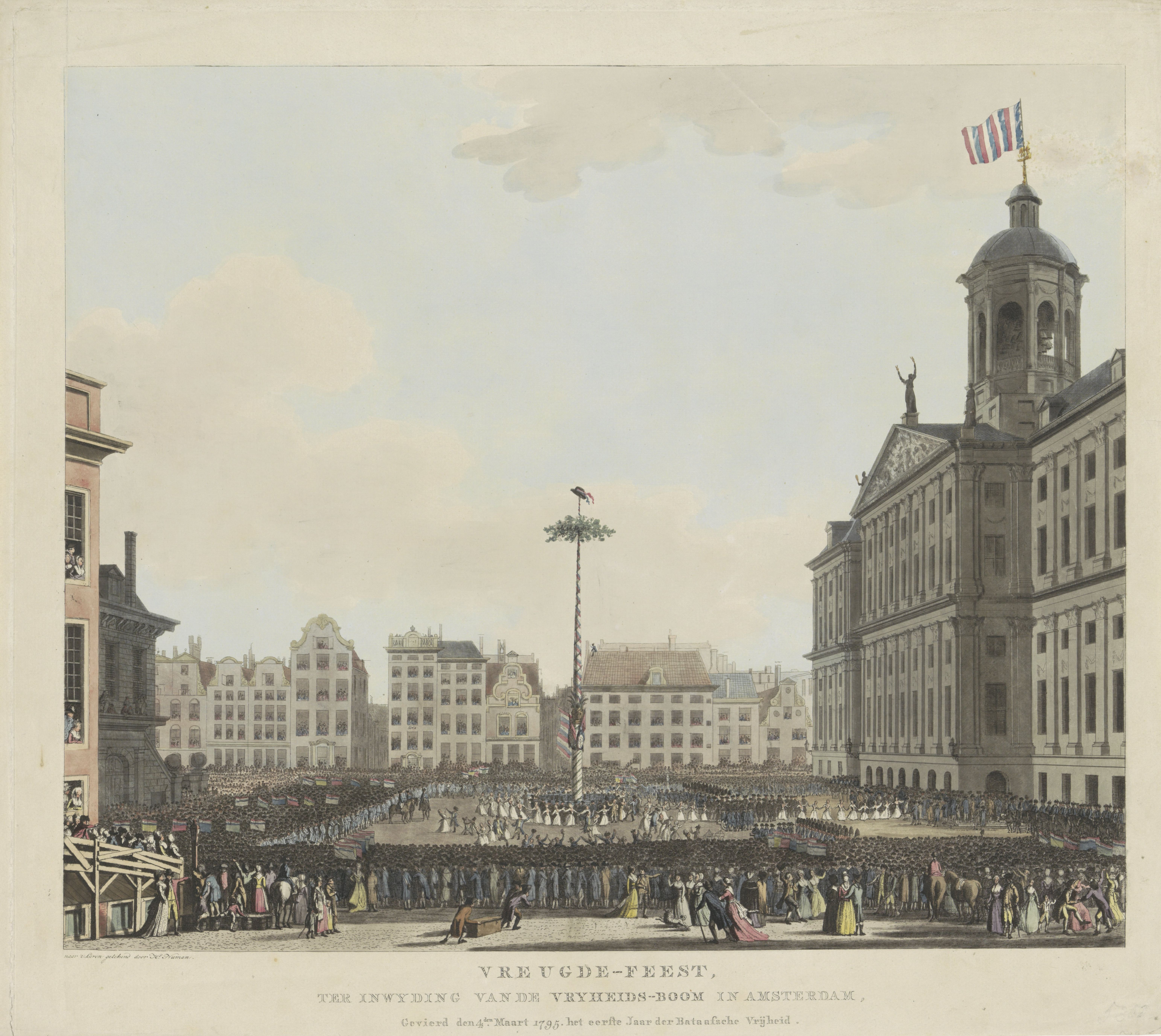
Liberty tree erected in Dam Square in Amsterdam, 1795 by H. Numan

The French Revolution was popular, and numerous underground clubs were promoting it when in January 1795 the French army invaded. The underground rose up, overthrew the municipal and provincial governments, and proclaimed the Batavian Republic (Dutch: Bataafse Republiek) in Amsterdam. Stadtholder William V fled to England and the States General dissolved itself. The new government was virtually a puppet of France. The Batavian Republic enjoyed widespread support and sent soldiers to fight in the French armies. The 1799 Anglo-Russian invasion of Holland was repulsed by Batavian–French forces. Nevertheless, Napoleon replaced it because the regime of Grand Pensionary Rutger Jan Schimmelpenninck (1805–1806) was insufficiently docile.

The confederal structure of the old Dutch Republic was permanently replaced by a unitary state. The 1798 constitution had a genuinely democratic character, though a coup d'état of 1801 put an authoritarian regime in power. Ministerial government was introduced for the first time in Dutch history and many of the current government departments date their history back to this period. British forces repeatedly occupied Dutch colonies during this period, and as a result the Napoleonic Wars Britain acquired permanent control over of Dutch Guiana (excluding Surinam), Ceylon and the Cape Colony. The Dutch East Indies were returned to the Netherlands under the Anglo-Dutch Treaty of 1814.

== Kingdom of Holland to William I (1806–1815) ==
Administrative divisions of the First French Empire in 1812, illustrating the incorporation of the Netherlands and its internal reorganisation

In 1806 Napoleon transformed the Netherlands (along with a small part of what is now Germany) into the Kingdom of Holland, installed his brother Louis Bonaparte on the throne as 'King of Holland' on 5 June the same year. The new king was unpopular, but he was willing to cross his brother for the benefit of his new kingdom. Napoleon forced his abdication in 1810 and incorporated the Netherlands directly into the French empire, imposing economic controls and conscription of all young men as soldiers.

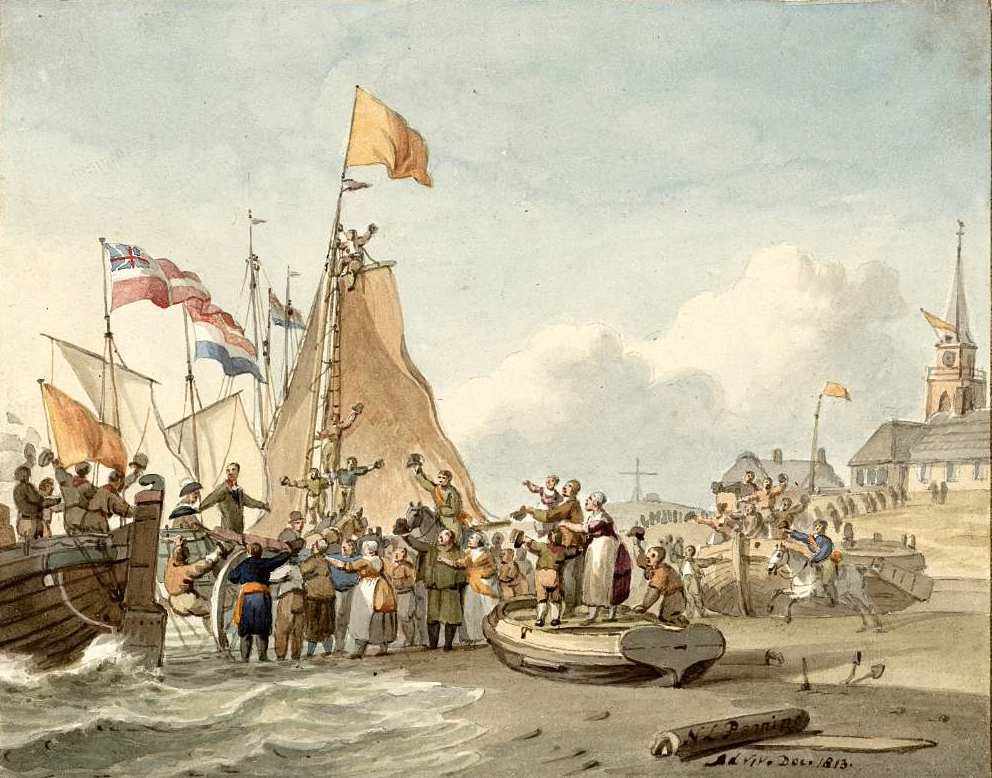
Landing of the future king William I at Scheveningen on 30 November 1813

When the French retreated from the northern provinces in 1813, a Triumvirate took over at the helm of a provisional government. Although most members of the provisional government had been among the men who had driven out William V 18 years earlier, the leaders of the provisional government knew that any new regime would have to be headed by his son, William Frederick. They also knew that it would be better in the long term if the Dutch people themselves installed the prince, rather than have him imposed on the country by the anti-French alliance. Accordingly, the Triumvirate called William Frederick back on 30 November and offered him the crown. He refused, but instead proclaimed himself "hereditary sovereign prince" on 6 December.

The Great Powers had secretly agreed to merge the northern Netherlands with the more populated Austrian Netherlands and the smaller Prince-Bishopric of Liège into a single constitutional monarchy. Having a stronger country on France's northern border was considered (especially by Tsar Alexander) to be an important part of the strategy to keep France's power in check. In 1814, William Frederick gained sovereignty over the Austrian Netherlands and Liège as well. Thus, William Frederick had fulfilled his family's three-century quest to unite the Low Countries under a single rule.

On 15 March 1815; with the encouragement of the powers gathered at the Congress of Vienna, William Frederick raised the Netherlands to the status of a kingdom and proclaimed himself King William I. This was made official later in 1815, when the Low Countries were formally recognized as the United Kingdom of the Netherlands. The crown was made a hereditary office of the House of Orange-Nassau.

== United Kingdom of the Netherlands (1815–1839) ==
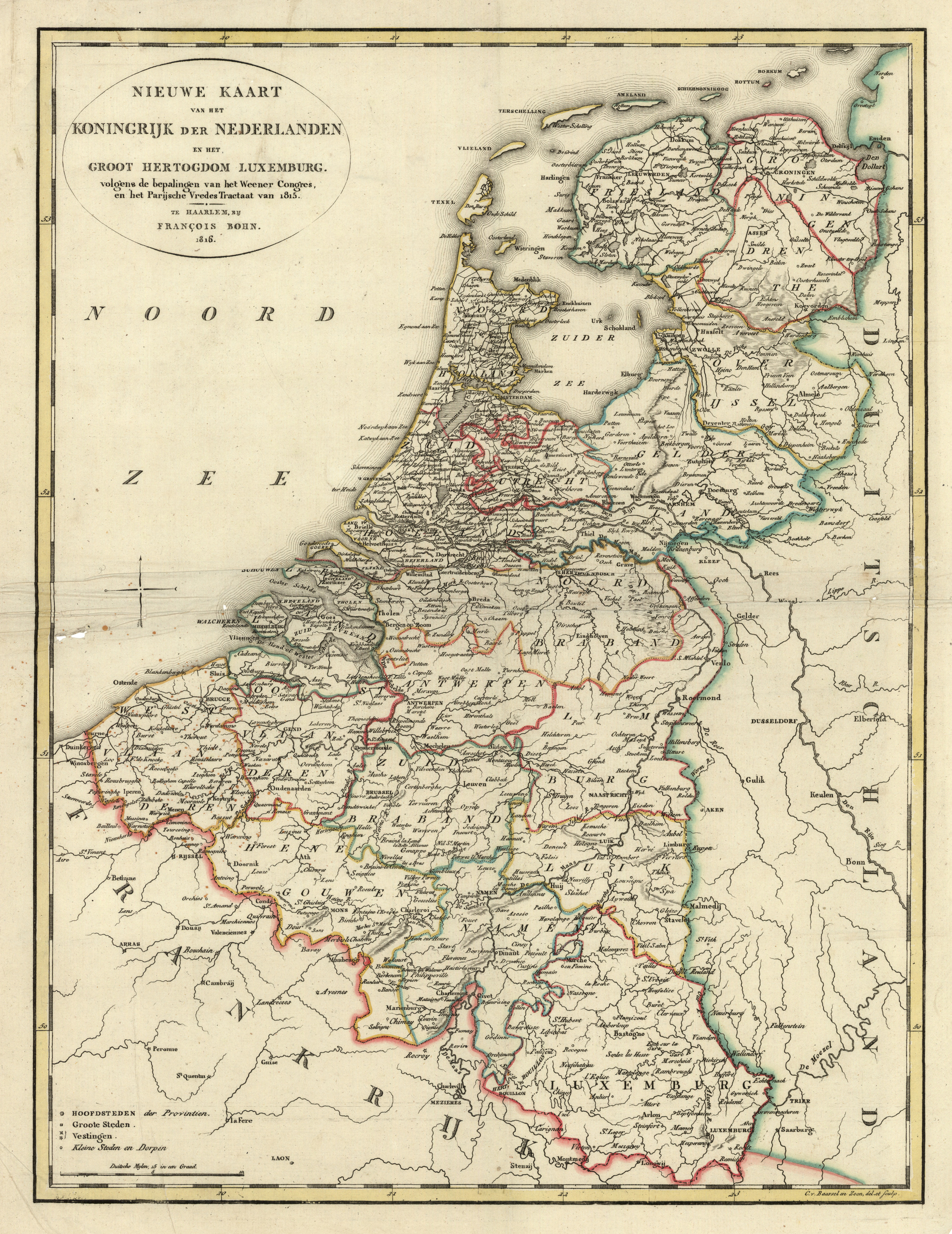
Map of the United Kingdom of the Netherlands and Luxembourg, 1815

William I became king and also became the hereditary Grand Duke of Luxembourg, that was part of the Netherlands but at the same time part of the German Confederation. The newly created country had two capitals: Amsterdam and Brussels. The new nation had two equal parts. The north (Netherlands proper) had 2 million people. They spoke chiefly Dutch but were divided religiously between a Protestant majority and a large Catholic minority. The south (which would be known as "Belgium" after 1830) had a population of 3.4 million people. Nearly all were Catholic, but it was divided between French-speaking Walloons and Dutch-speaking Flemings. The upper and middle classes in the south were mostly French-speaking. About 60,000 Belgians were eligible to vote, compared to about 80,000 Dutchmen. Officially Amsterdam was the capital, but in a compromise the government met alternately in Brussels and The Hague.

Adolphe Quetelet (1796–1874), the great Belgian statistician, calculated that the new nation was significantly better off than other states. Mortality was low, the food supply was good, education was good, public awareness was high and the charity rate was the highest in the world. The best years were in the mid-1820s.

The quality of schooling was dismal, however. According to Schama, about 1800 the local school teacher was the "humble auxiliary of the local priest. Despised by his co-villagers and forced to subsist on the gleanings of the peasants, he combined drumming the catechism into the heads of his unruly charges with the duties of winding the town clock, ringing the church bells or digging its graves. His principal use to the community was to keep its boys out of mischief when there was no labour for them in the fields, or setting the destitute orphans of the town to the 'useful arts' of picking tow or spinning crude flax. As one would expect, standards in such an occupation were dismal." But in 1806 the Dutch, led by Adriaan van den Ende, energetically set out to modernise education, focusing on a new system for advanced training of teachers with an elaborate system of inspectors, training courses, teacher examinations and teaching societies. By 1826, although much smaller than France, the Dutch national government was spending 12 times more than Paris on education.

=== Constitutional monarchy ===
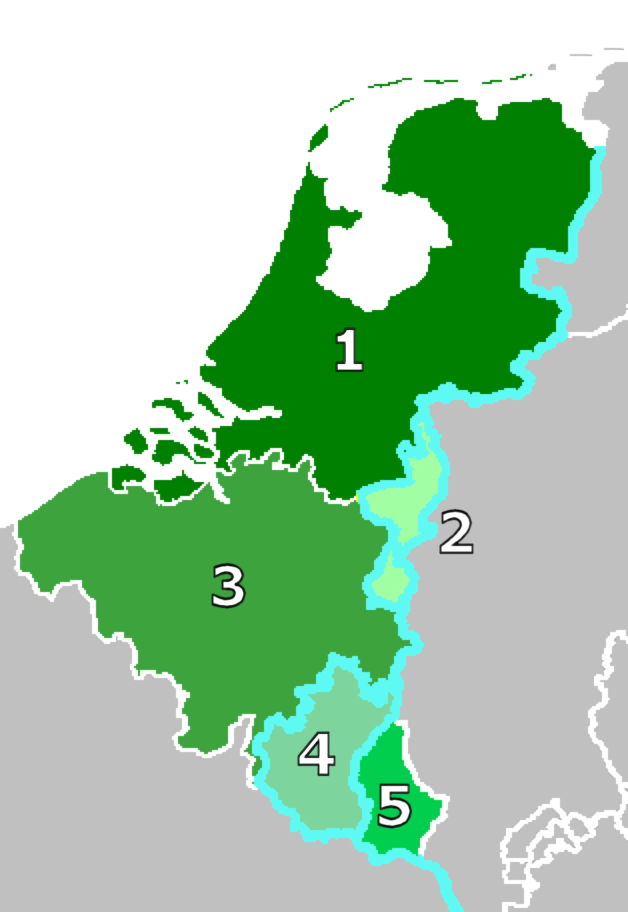
The Netherlands, Belgium, Luxembourg and Limburg in 1839 1, 2 and 3 United Kingdom of the Netherlands (until 1830) 1 and 2 Kingdom of the Netherlands (after 1839) 2 Duchy of Limburg (1839–1867) (in the German Confederacy after 1839 as compensation for Waals-Luxemburg) 3 and 4 Kingdom of Belgium (after 1839) 4 and 5 Grand Duchy of Luxembourg (borders until 1839) 4 Province of Luxembourg (Waals-Luxemburg, to Belgium in 1839) 5 Grand Duchy of Luxembourg (German Luxemburg; borders after 1839) In blue, the borders of the German Confederation.

William I, who reigned from 1815 to 1840, had great constitutional power. An enlightened despot, he accepted the modernizing transformations of the previous 25 years, including equality of all before the law. However, he resurrected the estates as a political class and elevated a large number of people to the nobility. Voting rights were still limited, and only the nobility were eligible for seats in the upper house. The old provinces were reestablished in name only. The government was now fundamentally unitary, and all authority flowed from the center.

William I was a Calvinist and unsympathetic to the religious culture and practices of the Catholic majority. He promulgated the "Fundamental Law of Holland", with some modifications. This entirely overthrew the old order of things in the southern Netherlands: it abolished the privileges of the Catholic Church, and guaranteed equal protection to every religious creed and the enjoyment of the same civil and political rights to every subject of the king. It reflected the spirit of the French Revolution and in so doing did not please the Catholic bishops in the south, who had detested the Revolution.

William I actively promoted economic modernization. The first 15 years of the Kingdom showed progress and prosperity, as industrialization proceeded rapidly in the south, where the Industrial Revolution allowed entrepreneurs and labor to combine in a new textile industry, powered by local coal mines. There was little industry in the northern provinces, but most overseas colonies were restored, and highly profitable trade resumed after a 25-year hiatus. Economic liberalism combined with moderate monarchical authoritarianism accelerated the adaptation of the Netherlands to the new conditions of the 19th century. The country prospered until a crisis arose in relations with the southern provinces.

=== Belgium breaks away ===
William was determined to create a united people, even though the north and south had drifted far apart in the past three centuries. Protestants were the largest denomination in the North (population 2 million), but formed a quarter of the population in the overwhelmingly Catholic South (population 3.5 million). Nevertheless, Protestants dominated William's government and army. The Catholics did not consider themselves an integral part of the United Netherlands, preferring instead to identify with medieval Dutch culture. Other factors that contributed to this feeling were economic (the South was industrialising, the North had always been a merchants' nation) and linguistic (French was spoken in Wallonia and a large part of the bourgeoisie in Flemish cities).

After having been dominant for centuries, the French-speaking elite in the Southern Netherlands now felt like second-class citizens. In the Catholic South, William's policies were unpopular. The French-speaking Walloons strenuously rejected his attempt to make Dutch the universal language of government, while the population of Flanders was divided. Flemings in the south spoke a Dutch dialect ("Flemish") and welcomed the encouragement of Dutch with a revival of literature and popular culture. Other Flemings, notably the educated bourgeoisie, preferred to speak French. Although Catholics possessed legal equality, they resented their subordination to a government that was fundamentally Protestant in spirit and membership after having been the state church for centuries in the north. Few Catholics held high office in state or army. Furthermore, political liberals in the south complained about the king's authoritarian methods. All southerners complained of underrepresentation in the national legislature. Although the south was industrializing and was more prosperous than the north the accumulated grievances allowed the multiple opposition forces to coalesce.

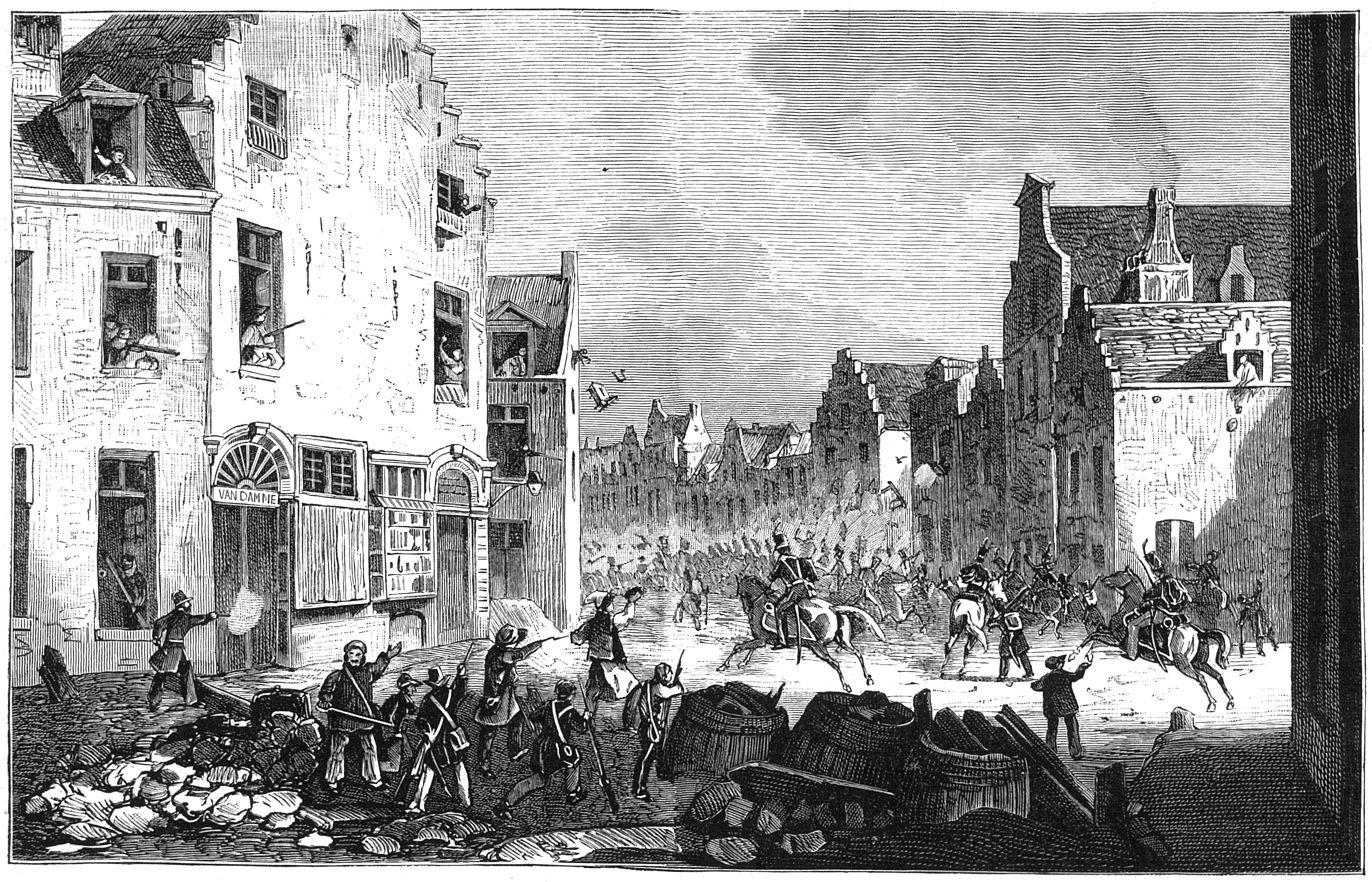
Fighting between Belgian rebels and the Dutch military expedition in Brussels in September 1830

The outbreak of revolution in France in 1830 was a signal for action, at first on behalf of autonomy for Belgium, as the southern provinces were now called, and later on behalf of total independence. William dithered and his half-hearted efforts to reconquer Belgium were thwarted both by the efforts of the Belgians themselves and by the diplomatic opposition of the great powers.

At the London Conference of 1830, the chief powers of Europe ordered (in November 1830) an armistice between the Dutch and the Belgians. The first draft for a treaty of separation of Belgium and the Netherlands was rejected by the Belgians. A second draft (June 1831) was rejected by William I, who resumed hostilities. Franco-British intervention forced William to withdraw Dutch forces from Belgium late in 1831, and in 1833 an armistice of indefinite duration was concluded. Belgium was effectively independent but William's attempts to recover Luxembourg and Limburg led to renewed tension. The London Conference of 1838–1839 prepared the final Dutch-Belgian separation treaty of 1839. It divided Luxembourg and Limburg between the Dutch and Belgian crowns. The Kingdom of the Netherlands thereafter was made up of the 11 northern provinces.

== Democratic and Industrial Development (1840–1900) ==
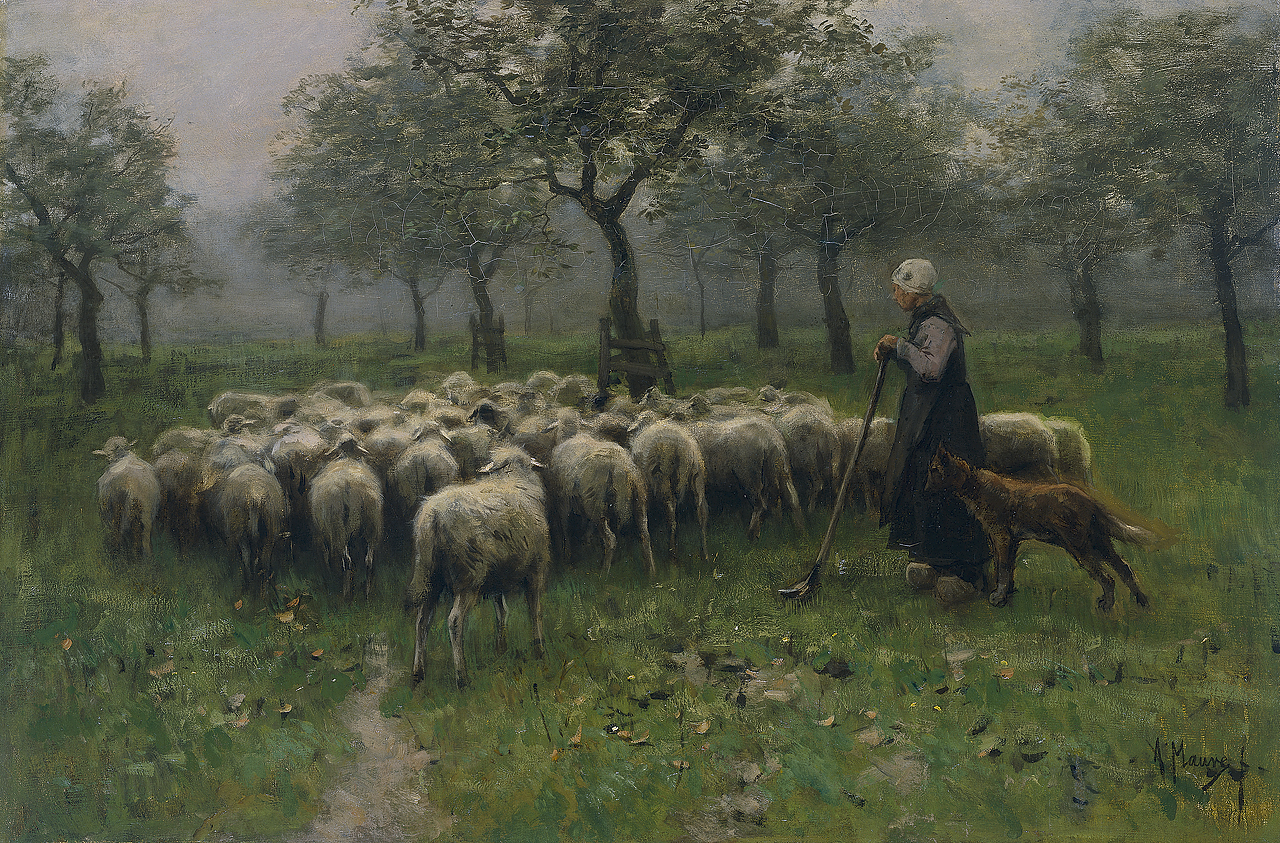
Shepherdess With a Flock of Sheep by Anton Mauve (1838–1888), of the Hague School

The Netherlands did not industrialize as rapidly as Belgium after 1830, but it was prosperous enough. Griffiths argues that certain government policies facilitated the emergence of a national economy in the 19th century. They included the abolition of internal tariffs and guilds, a unified coinage system, modern methods of tax collection, standardized weights and measures, and the building of many roads, canals, and railroads. However, compared to Belgium, which was leading in industrialization on the Continent, the Netherlands moved slowly. Possible explanations for this difference are the higher costs due to geography and high wages, and the emphasis of entrepreneurs on trade rather than industry.

For example, in the Dutch coastal provinces agricultural productivity was relatively high. Hence, industrial growth arrived relatively late – after 1860 – because incentives to move to labour-intensive industry were quite weak. However, the provinces of North Brabant and Overijssel did industrialize, and they became the most economically advanced areas of the country.

As in the rest of Europe, the 19th century saw the gradual transformation of the Netherlands into a modern middle-class industrial society. The number of people employed in agriculture decreased, while the country made a strong effort to revive its stake in the highly competitive shipping and trade business. The Netherlands lagged behind Belgium until the late 19th century in industrialization, and caught up around 1920. Major industries included textiles and (later) the great Philips industrial conglomerate. Rotterdam became a major shipping and manufacturing center. Poverty slowly declined as begging largely disappeared along with steadily improving working conditions for the population.

=== 1848 Constitutional reform and liberalism ===
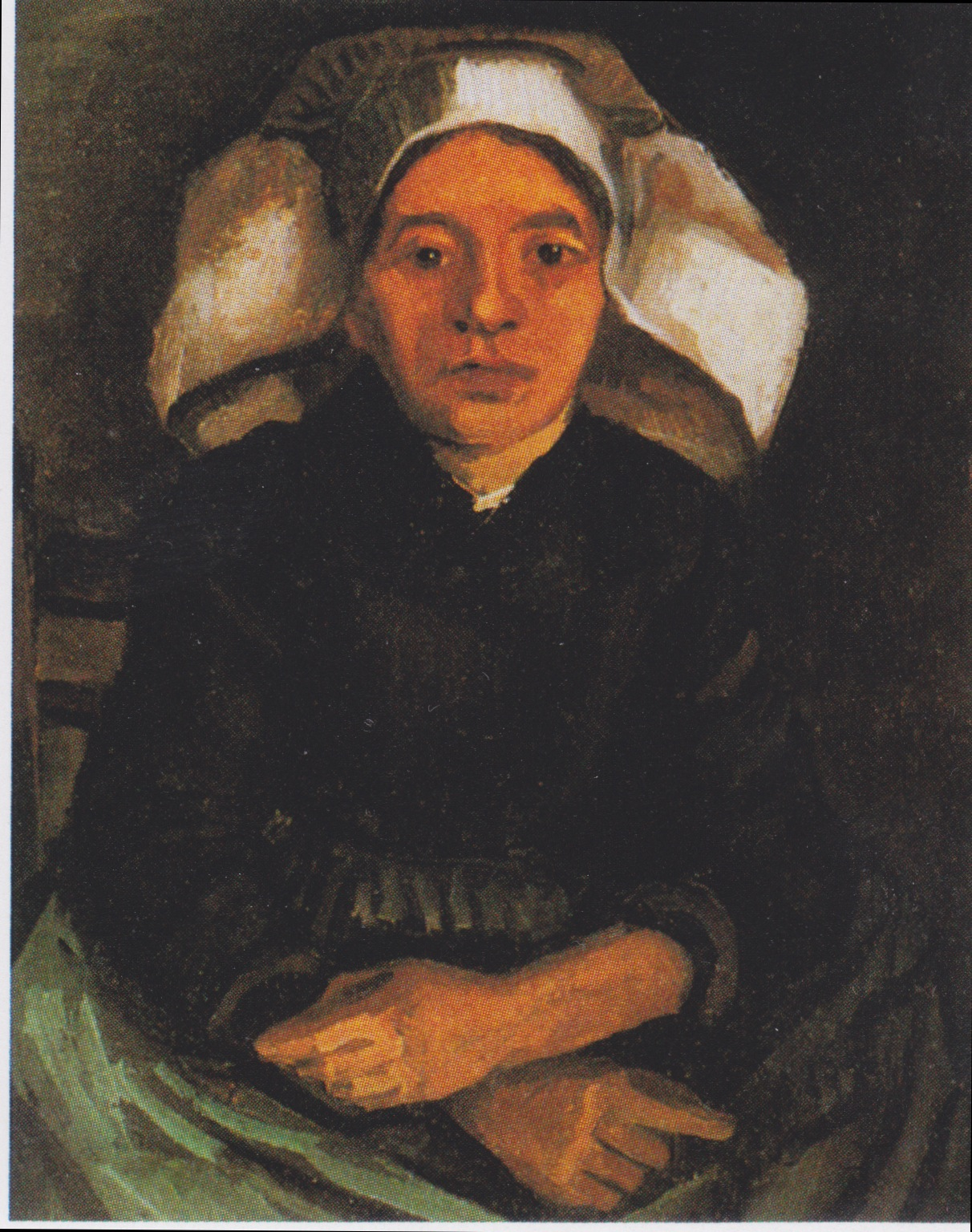
Peasant woman, seated, with a white hood, painted in Nuenen in December 1884 by Vincent van Gogh (1853–1890). Born in Groot-Zundert, van Gogh was a Dutch post-Impressionist painter whose work, notable for its rough beauty, emotional honesty and bold color, had a far-reaching influence on 20th-century art.

In 1840 William I abdicated in favor of his son, William II, who attempted to carry on the policies of his father in the face of a powerful liberal movement. In 1848 unrest broke out all over Europe. Although there were no major events in the Netherlands, these foreign developments persuaded King William II to agree to liberal and democratic reform. That same year Johan Rudolf Thorbecke, a prominent liberal, was asked by the king to draft a constitution that would turn the Netherlands into a constitutional monarchy. The new constitution was proclaimed on 3 November 1848. It severely limited the king's powers (making the government accountable only to an elected parliament), and it protected civil liberties. The new liberal constitution, which put the government under the control of the States General, was accepted by the legislature in 1848. The relationship between monarch, government and parliament has remained essentially unchanged ever since. In fact, the current Constitution of the Netherlands is the 1848 Constitution, albeit with amendments.

William II was succeeded by William III in 1849. The new king reluctantly chose Thorbecke to head the new government, which introduced several liberal measures, notably the extension of suffrage. However, Thorbecke's government soon fell, when Protestants rioted against the Vatican's reestablishment of the Catholic episcopate, in abeyance since the 16th century. A conservative government was formed, but it did not undo the liberal measures, and the Catholics were finally given equality after two centuries of subordination. Dutch political history from the middle of the 19th century until the First World War was fundamentally one of the extension of liberal reforms in government, the reorganization and modernization of the Dutch economy, and the rise of trade unionism and socialism as working-class movements independent of traditional liberalism. The growth in prosperity was enormous, as real per capita GNP soared from 106 guilders in 1804 to 403 in 1913.

In terms of social issues, there existed agreement between liberals and other groups on the need to address problems in Dutch society. As noted by one observer

The ideas that Liberalism stood for had, at the beginning of Wilhelmina’s reign, become the common heritage of all. This does no mean to imply that party divisions had ceased to exist, but it cannot be denied that the individual Hollander, whatever his political allegiance, was a Liberal in thought. Reactionary opinions might still be harbored by conservative landowners and some old-time aristocrats of the Christian Historical Party, but the large majority of both Calvinists and Catholics were progressive and at one with the Liberals on plans for social betterment and reform. The workers’ right to protection against the effects of disability, disease and old age was widely recognized, and proposals for various legislative enactments that would guarantee freedom from want to all citizens met with slight opposition from any party. The objections raised were not prompted by any desire to deny that right, but by a theoretical aversion to all state interference in the private lives of its citizens.

=== Religion and pillarisation ===
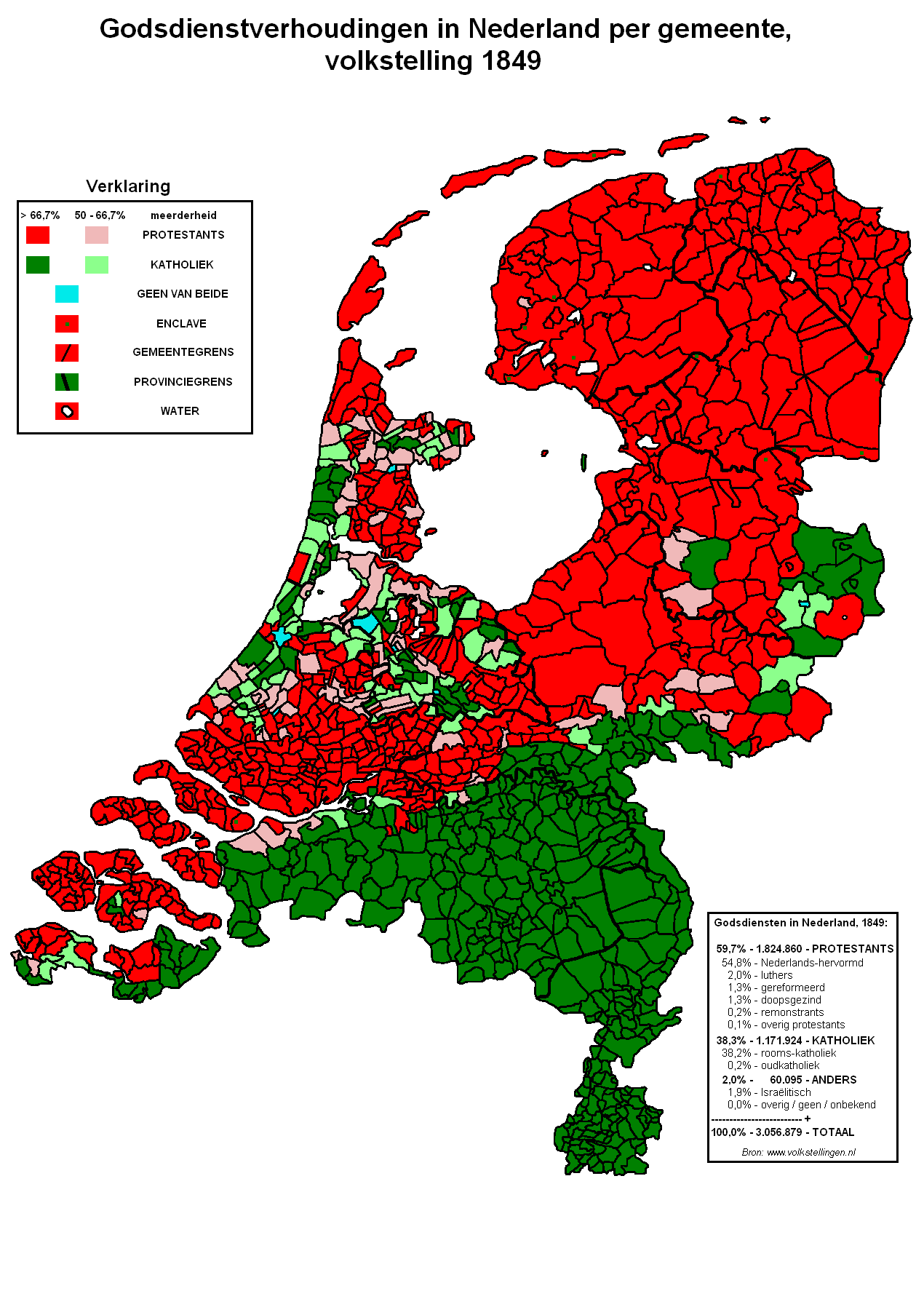
Religion in the Netherlands in 1849. Roman Catholicism Protestantism (Calvinist)

Religion was a contentious issue with repeated struggles over the relations of church and state in the field of education. In 1816, the government took full control of the Dutch Reformed Church (Dutch: Nederlands Hervormde Kerk). In 1857, all religious instruction was ended in public schools, but the various churches set up their own schools, and even universities. Dissident members broke away from the Dutch Reformed Church in the Secession of 1834. They were harassed by the government under an onerous Napoleonic law prohibiting gatherings of more than 20 members without a permit. After the harassment ended in the 1850s, a number of these dissidents eventually created the Christian Reformed Church in 1869; thousands migrated to Michigan, Illinois, and Iowa in the United States. By 1900, the dissidents represented about 10% of the population, compared to 45% of the population who were in the Dutch Reformed Church, which continued to be the only church to receive state money.

At mid-century, most Dutch belonged either to the Dutch Reformed Church or dissenter groups that separated from it (around 55%), or the Roman Catholic Church (35% to 40%), together with smaller Protestant (for example, Lutheran) and Jewish groups. A large and powerful sector of nominal Protestants were in fact secular liberals seeking to minimize religious influence. In reaction a novel alliance developed with Catholics and devout Calvinists joining against secular liberals. The Catholics, who had been loosely allied with the liberals in earlier decades, turned against them on the issue of state support, which the liberals insisted should be granted only to public schools, and joined with Protestant political parties in demanding equal state support to schools maintained by religious groups.

The Netherlands remained one of the most tolerant countries in Europe towards religious belief, although conservative Protestants objected to the liberalization of the Dutch Reformed Church during the 19th century and faced opposition from the government when they tried to establish separate communities (Catholics and other non-Protestants were left unmolested by Dutch authorities). Some moved to the United States as a consequence, but as the century drew to a close, religious persecution had totally ceased.

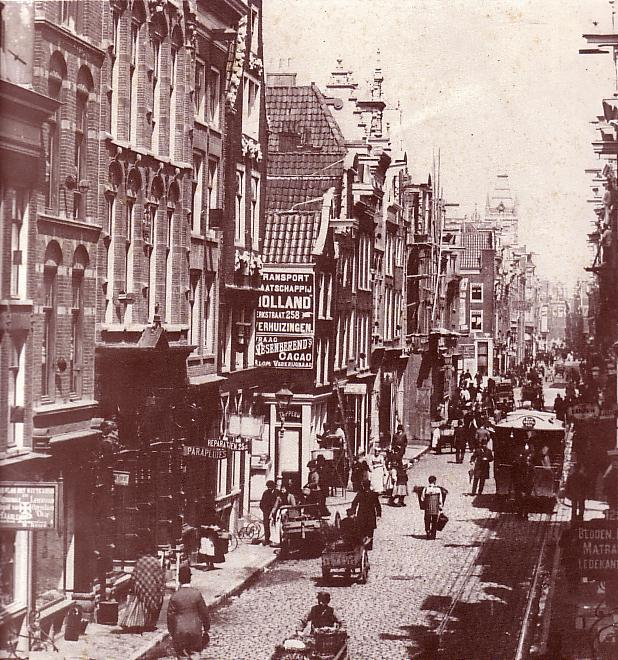
Street in Amsterdam in 1891 (Vijzelstraat looking towards Muntplein)

Dutch social and political life became divided by fairly clear-cut internal borders that were emerging as the society pillarized into three separate parts based on religion. The economy was not affected. One of the people most responsible for designing pillarization was Abraham Kuyper (1837–1920), a leading politician, neo-Calvinist theologian, and journalist. Kuyper established orthodox Calvinist organizations, and also provided a theoretical framework by developing such concepts as "sphere-sovereignty" that celebrated Dutch society as a society of organized minorities. Verzuiling ("pillarization" or "pluralism") after 1850 became the solution to the danger of internal conflict. Everyone was part of one (and only one) pillar (zuil) based chiefly on religion (Protestant, Catholic, secular). The secular pillar eventually split into a socialist/working class pillar and a liberal (pro-business) secular pillar. Each pillar built a full set of its own social organizations, including churches (for the religious pillars), political parties, schools, universities, labor unions, sport clubs, boy scout unions and other youth clubs, and newspapers. The members of different zuilen lived in close proximity in cities and villages, spoke the same language, and did business with one another, but seldom interacted informally and rarely intermarried. In politics Kuyper formed the Anti-Revolutionary Party (ARP) in 1879, and headed it until 1905.

Pillarization was officially recognized in the Pacification of 1917, whereby socialists and liberals achieved their goal of universal male suffrage and the religious parties were guaranteed equal funding of all schools. In 1930 radio was organized so that each pillar had full control of its own network. When television began in the late 1940s the pillars divided up time equally on the one station. In politics and civic affairs leaders of the pillar organizations cooperated and they acknowledged the right of the other pillars, so public life generally ran smoothly.

=== Flourishing of art, culture and science ===
The late 19th century saw a cultural revival. The Hague School brought a revival of realist painting, 1860–1890. The world-famous Dutch painter was Vincent van Gogh, but he spent most of his career in France. Literature, music, architecture and science also flourished. A representative leader of science was Johannes Diderik van der Waals (1837–1923), a working class youth who taught himself physics, earned a PhD at the nation's leading school Leiden University, and in 1910 won the Nobel Prize for his discoveries in thermodynamics. Hendrik Lorentz (1853–1928) and his student Pieter Zeeman (1865–1943) shared the 1902 Nobel Prize in physics. Other notable scientists included biologist Hugo de Vries (1848–1935), who rediscovered Mendelian genetics.

== 1900 to present ==
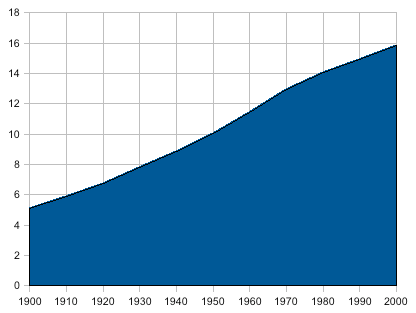
Population growth 1900–2000

From 1900 to 1940, the Netherlands experienced significant population growth. This era included significant colonial expansion, particularly in the Dutch East Indies, coupled with the challenges posed by World War I and the Great Depression. Although the Netherlands maintained neutrality during World War I, its strategic geographic location and colonial resources had profound implications for its economic and political stability. The period saw the rise of socialism and labor unrest, which were partly driven by industrialization and the shifting dynamics of Dutch society. A half-hearted socialist revolution attempt during the Red Week in November 1918 failed.

World War II marked a devastating period for the Netherlands, which suffered under German occupation from 1940 until liberation in 1945. The war's impact was severe, with the Rotterdam Blitz causing extensive destruction and loss of life. Dutch resistance was significant, though the nation also faced collaboration from within. Post-war, the Netherlands underwent a painful process of recovery and retribution against collaborators. The immediate post-war years were focused on rebuilding and economic stabilization, facilitated by U.S. aid through the Marshall Plan, which helped to revive the Dutch economy and infrastructure.

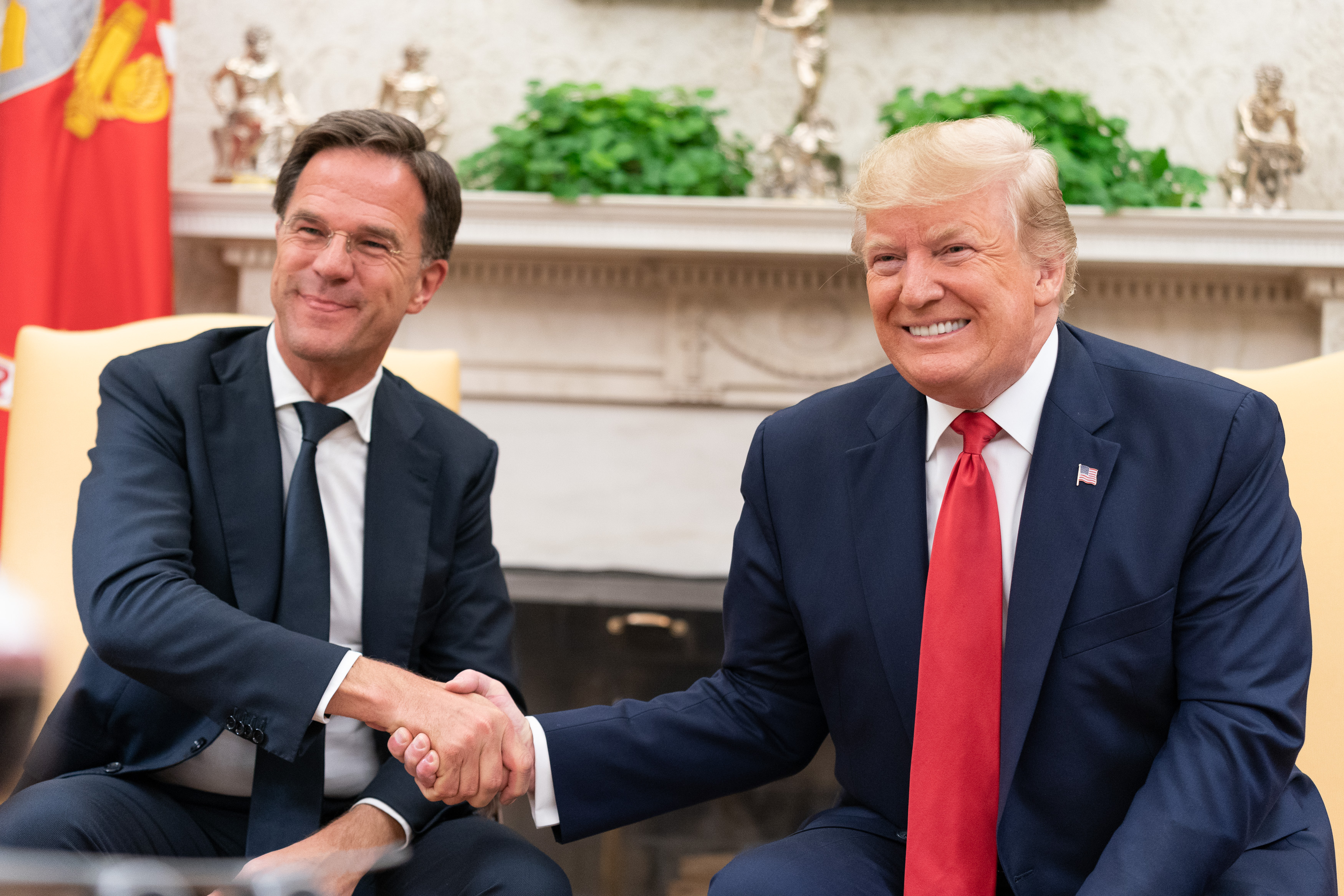
Dutch Prime Minister Mark Rutte and U.S. President Donald Trump in the Oval Office on 18 July 2019

The post-war period saw significant changes in the Dutch empire, with Indonesia proclaiming independence in 1945, leading to a violent and tumultuous decolonization process completed in 1949. This era brought about substantial social change within the Netherlands, including the establishment of a welfare state in the subsequent decades. Economic prosperity in the 1960s and 1970s led to social liberalization, culminating in progressive policies on immigration, drugs, and euthanasia. The Netherlands also became a founding member of key international institutions, including the European Union, reflecting its deepening commitment to international cooperation.

== Historians ==
- Julia Adams, economic and social history
- Petrus Johannes Blok, survey
- J. C. H. Blom, survey
- M. R. Boxell, political history
- Pieter Geyl, Dutch revolt; historiography
- Johan Huizinga (1872–1945), cultural history
- Jonathan Israel, Dutch Republic, Age of Enlightenment, Baruch Spinoza
- Louis De Jong, World War II
- John Lothrop Motley, American historian of the Dutch Revolt
- Jan Romein (1893–1962), theoretical and world history
- Jan de Vries, economic history

== Historiography ==
The American John Lothrop Motley was the first foreign historian to write a major history of the Dutch Republic. In 3500 pages he crafted a literary masterpiece that was translated into numerous languages; his dramatic story reached a wide audience in the 19th century. Motley relied heavily on Dutch scholarship and immersed himself in the sources. His style no longer attracts readers, and scholars have moved away from his simplistic dichotomies of good versus evil, Dutch versus Spanish, Catholic versus Protestant, freedom versus authoritarianism. His theory of causation overemphasized ethnicity as an unchanging characteristic, exaggerated the importance of William of Orange, and gave undue importance to the issue of religious tolerance.

The pioneering Dutch cultural historian Johan Huizinga, author of The Autumn of the Middle Ages (1919) (the English translation was called The Waning of the Middle Ages) and Homo Ludens: A Study of the Play Element in Culture (1935), which expanded the field of cultural history and influenced the historical anthropology of younger historians of the French Annales School. He was influenced by art history and advised historians to trace "patterns of culture" by studying "themes, figures, motifs, symbols, styles and sentiments".

The "polder model" continues to strongly influence historians as well as Dutch political discussion. The polder model stressed the need for finding consensus and discouraged furious debate and angry dissent in both academia and politics – in contrast to the highly developed, intense debates in Germany.

The H-Net list H-Low-Countries is published free by email and is edited by scholars. Its occasional messages serve an international community with diverse methodological approaches, archival experiences, teaching styles, and intellectual traditions, promotes discussion relevant to the region and to the different national histories in particular, with an emphasis on the Netherlands. H-Low-Countries publishes conference announcements, questions and discussions; reviews of books, journals, and articles; and tables of contents of journals on the history of the Low Countries (in both Dutch and English). After World War II both research-oriented and teaching-oriented historians have been rethinking their interpretive approaches to Dutch history, balancing traditional memories and modern scholarship. In terms of popular history, there has been an effort to ensure greater historical accuracy in museums and historic tourist sites.

Once heralded as the leading event of modern Dutch history, the Dutch Revolt lasted from 1568 to 1648, and historians have worked to interpret it for even longer. In 2007, Laura Cruz explained the major debates among scholars regarding the Dutch bid for independence from Spanish rule. While agreeing that the intellectual milieus of late 19th and 20th centuries affected historians' interpretations, Cruz argued that writings about the revolt trace changing perceptions of the role played by small countries in the history of Europe. In recent decades grand theory has fallen out of favor among most scholars, who emphasize the particular over the general. Dutch and Belgian historiography since 1945 no longer says the revolt was the culmination of an inevitable process leading to independence and freedom. Instead scholars have put the political and economic details of the towns and provinces under the microscope, while agreeing on the weaknesses of attempts at centralization by the Habsburg rulers. The most influential new studies have been rooted in demographic and economic history, though scholars continue to debate the relationship between economics and politics. The religious dimension has been viewed in terms of mentalities, exposing the minority position of Calvinism, while the international aspects have been studied more seriously by foreign historians than by the Dutch themselves.

Pieter Geyl was the leading historian of the Dutch Revolt, and an influential professor at the University of London (1919–1935) and at the State University of Utrecht (1936–1958). He wrote a six-volume history of the Dutch-speaking peoples. The Nazis imprisoned him in World War II. In his political views, Geyl adopted the views of the 17th-century Dutch Louvestein faction, led by Johan van Oldenbarneveldt and Johan de Witt. It stood for liberty, toleration, and national interests in contrast to the Orange stadholders who sought to promote their own self-interest. According to Geyl, the Dutch Republic reached the peak of its powers during the 17th century. He was also a staunch nationalist and suggested that Flanders could split off from Belgium and join the Netherlands. Later he decried what he called radical nationalism and stressed more the vitality of Western Civilization. Geyl was highly critical of the world history approach of Arnold J. Toynbee.

Jan Romein created a "theoretical history" in an attempt to reestablish the relevance of history to public life in the 1930s at a time of immense political uncertainty and cultural crisis, when Romein thought that history had become too inward-looking and isolated from other disciplines. Romein, a Marxist, wanted history to contribute to social improvement. At the same time, influenced by the successes of theoretical physics and his study of Oswald Spengler, Arnold J. Toynbee, Frederick John Teggart, and others, he spurred on the development of theoretical history in the Netherlands, to the point where it became a subject in its own right at the university level after the war. Romein used the term integral history as a substitute for cultural history and focused his attention on the period around the turn of the century. He concluded that a serious crisis occurred in European civilization in 1900 because of the rise of anti-Semitism, extreme nationalism, discontent with the parliamentary system, depersonalization of the state, and the rejection of positivism. European civilization waned as the result of this crisis which was accompanied by the rise of the United States, the Americanization of the world, and the emergence of Asia. His interpretation is reminiscent of that of his mentor Johan Huizinga and was criticized by his colleague Pieter Geyl.

== See also ==
- Canon of the Netherlands
- Culture of the Netherlands
- Demographics of the Netherlands
- Dutch diaspora
- Dutch East Indies
- Economy of the Netherlands
- Geography of the European Netherlands
- History of religion in the Netherlands
- List of prime ministers of the Netherlands
- List of monarchs of the Netherlands
- Political history of the Netherlands
- Provinces of the Netherlands
- Netherlands in World War II
