= 1989 in the Netherlands =

- Decades: 1960s; 1970s; 1980s; 1990s; 2000s
- See also: Other events of 1989; History of the Netherlands

Events in the year 1989 in the Netherlands.

== Incumbents ==
- Monarch: Beatrix
- Prime Minister: Ruud Lubbers

== Events ==
- February–March - Beginning of the 1989–1990 Dutch farmers' protests
- 6 September – 1989 Dutch general election
- 22 October – 1989 De Meer nail bombs

== Births ==
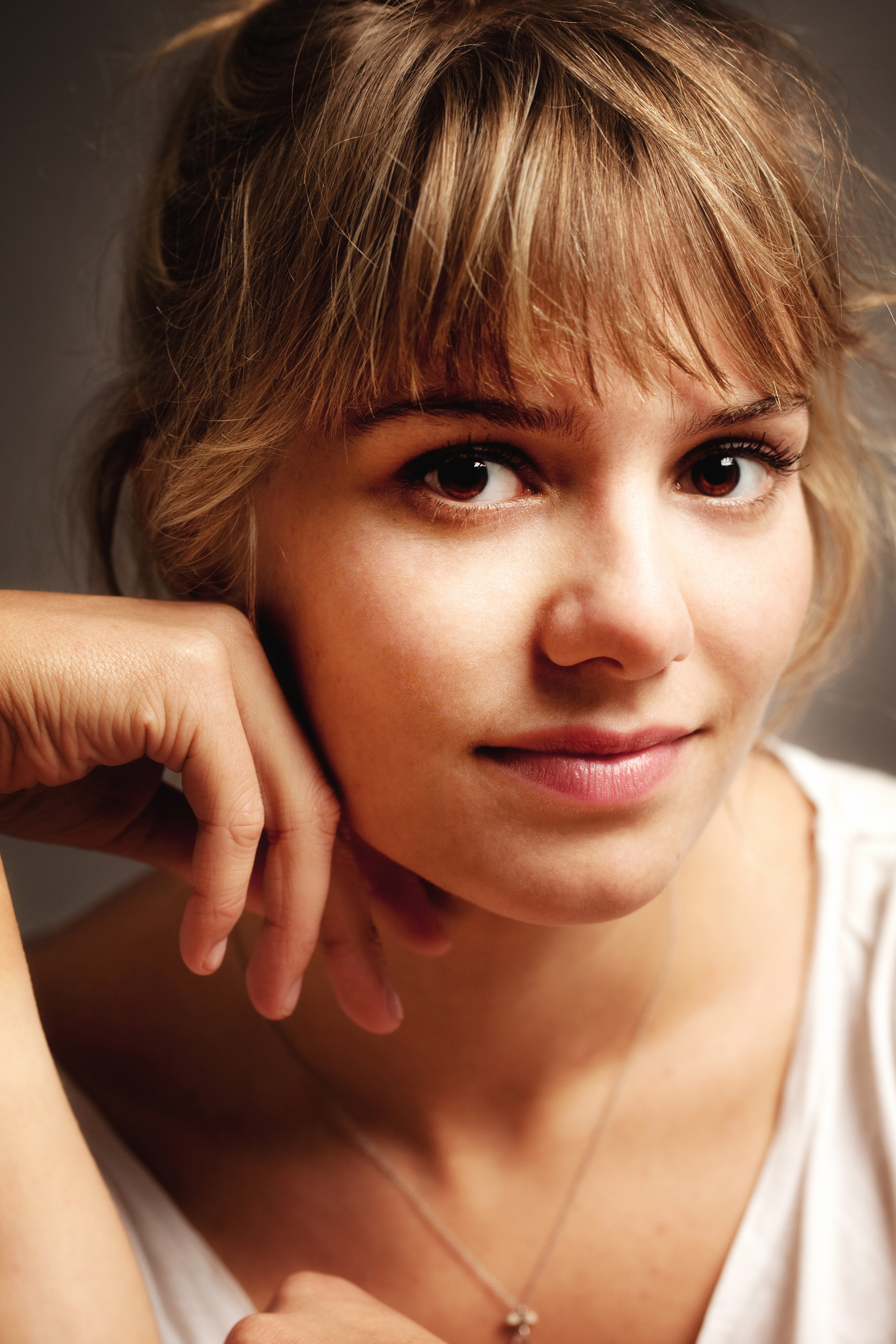
Sallie Harmsen

- 9 January
  - Na-Young Jeon, stage actress and singer
  - Michaëlla Krajicek, tennis player
- 13 March – Annick Lipman, handball player.
- 30 March – Denise Kielholtz, Muay Thai fighter and mixed martial artist
- 6 April – Elise van Hage, racing cyclist
- 9 April – Monique Smit, singer and television presenter
- 10 April – Rico Verhoeven, kickboxer
- 2 May – Sallie Harmsen, actress
- 20 May – Martine van der Velde, politician
- 30 May – Gijs Jorna, volleyball player
- 2 June – Darius van Driel, professional golfer
- 21 June – Jarno Gmelich, cyclist
- 8 July – Rachèl Louise, singer-songwriter
- 14 July – Patricia van der Vliet, fashion model
- 15 August – Yannick van de Velde, actor
- 16 August – Roeland Pruijssers, chess player.
- 4 September – Roy Eefting, road and track cyclist
- 9 September – Amber Brantsen, broadcaster and journalist
- 1 October – Robin van Roosmalen, kickboxer and mixed martial artist
- 21 October – Tony Junior, DJ and record producer
- 5 November – Marijke Synhaeve, politician
- 9 November – Reinout Scholten van Aschat, actor
- 11 November – Oedo Kuipers, singer and actor
- 16 November – Sanae Orchi, model, entrepreneur, presenter and journalist
- 17 November – Gwen van Poorten, presenter
- 3 December – Bette Franke, model

=== Full date missing ===
- Emil Landman, folk musician
- Yves Rogers, basketball player

== Deaths ==
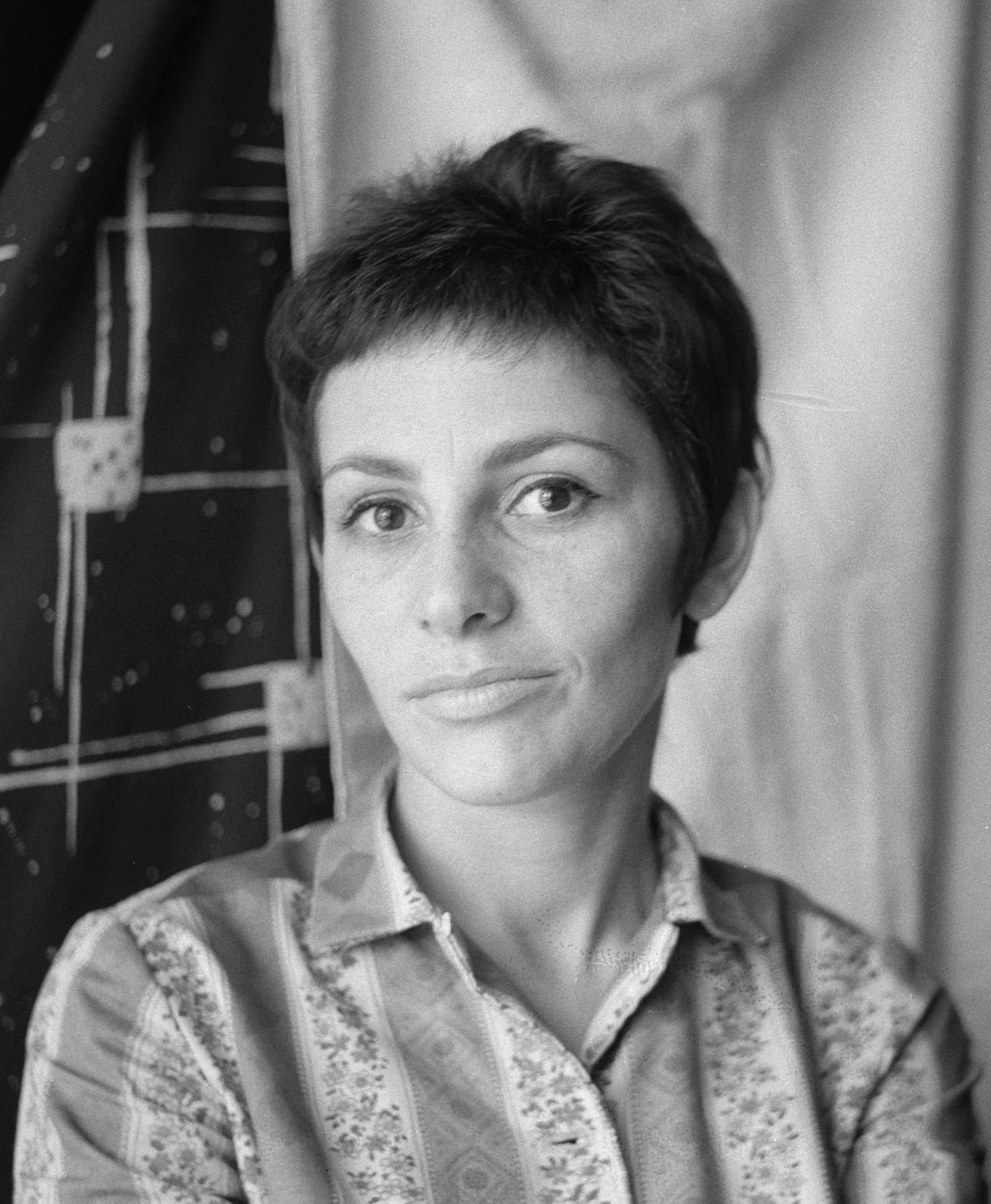
Ann Burton

- 20 January – Dolf van Kol, footballer (b. 1902)
- 14 March – Jan de Groote, farmer and politician (b. 1911).
- 11 May – Johan Schouten, wrestler (b. 1910).
- 30 September – Liesbeth Ribbius Peletier, socialist feminist politician (b. 1891)
- 20 October – Jan Stender, swimming coach (b. 1906)
- 29 November – Ann Burton (Johanna Rafalowicz), jazz singer (b. 1933)

=== Full date missing ===
- Tom Dissevelt, composer (b. 1921)
