= 1988 in the Netherlands =

- Decades: 1960s; 1970s; 1980s; 1990s; 2000s
- See also: Other events of 1988; History of the Netherlands

Events in the year 1988 in the Netherlands.

== Incumbents ==
- Monarch: Beatrix
- Prime Minister: Ruud Lubbers

== Events ==
- 30 April — Queen's Day. During this day: Queen Beatrix kissed by a bystander.
- 1 May – 1988 IRA attacks in the Netherlands
- 25 June - Dutch national soccer team wins UEFA Euro 1988 in West Germany.

== Births ==
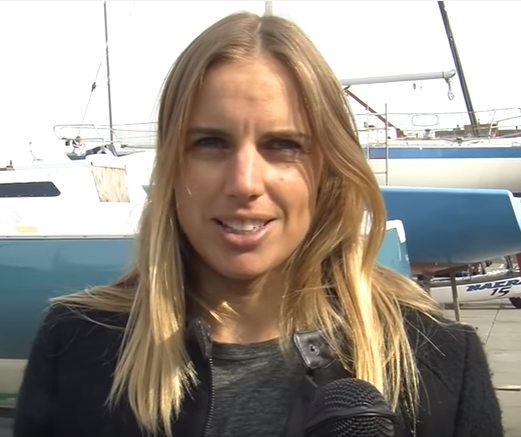
Marit Bouwmeester

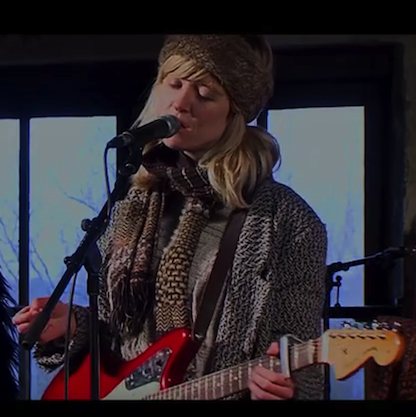
Amber Arcades

- 6 January – Marly van der Velden, actress and fashion designer
- 17 January – Joey Eijpe, baseball player
- 18 February – Stefan Struve, mixed martial artist
- 16 March – Johim Ariesen, cyclist
- 30 March – Ruben Lenten, professional kite surfer
- 18 April – Rob Dieperink, FIFA football referee (d. 2026)
- 4 May – Nycke Groot, handball player.
- 17 June – Marit Bouwmeester, competitive sailor.
- 5 August – Stefanie Joosten, model, singer and actress
- 9 August – Etienne Bax, sidecarcross rider
- 18 October – Jorina Baars, kickboxer
- 18 October – Tessa Schram, actress and director
- 15 December – Amber Arcades, singer-songwriter
- 15 December – Boaz van de Beatz, record producer and DJ

=== Full date missing ===
- Rutger Bregman, historian
- Jan-Willem Breure, media producer and festival director

== Deaths ==
- 4 January – Leo de Block, politician (b. 1904)
- 29 January – Rogier van Otterloo, composer and conductor (b. 1941)
- 13 February – Tim Griek, musician and producer (b. 1944)
- 13 May – Caecilia Loots, teacher and antifascist resistance member (b. 1903)
- 14 May – Willem Dreesm politician (b. 1886)
- 1 July – Willem Drees, composer (b. 1919)
- 10 August – Paul Lodewijkx, motorcycle road racer (b. 1947)
- 4 December – Jan Mesdag, singer and cabaret artist (b. 1953)
- 25 December – Cornelis Eecen, competitive rower (b. 1898).

=== Full date missing ===
- Josef Santen, painter (b. 1926)
