= 1981 in the Netherlands =

- Decades: 1960s; 1970s; 1980s; 1990s; 2000s
- See also: Other events of 1981; History of the Netherlands

This article lists some of the events from 1981 related to the Netherlands.

== Incumbents ==
- Monarch: Beatrix
- Prime Minister: Dries van Agt

== Events ==
- January 5: First broadcast of Youth news.
- January 19: Nijmegen is faced with turmoil when squatters are evicted to make way for a parking garage.
- January 23: Heavy riots occur in Nijmegen with the eviction of squatters in the Piersonstraat. The area was proposed as a parking garage that would be canceled.
- March 22: HGC is the first hockey club that has its men and women team members play in their highest divisions. This happened with the ascension of the women during the 75th anniversary of the club.
- April 5: Hennie Kuiper wins Tour of Flanders cycling race.
- April 12: The Python roller-coaster is opened in the Efteling theme park.
- April 25: During the world championship ice hockey in Sweden The Netherlands men's national ice hockey team relegate to B-division after losing to West Germany 12–6.
- May 22: FC Utrecht play their final match at Galgenwaard Stadium. Supporters taking keepsakes would dismantle a substantial part of the structure.
- May 26: Dutch general election, 1981
- May 31: The final two parts of the Schiphol-line are officially opened.
- June 1: Football club N.E.C. is established in Nijmegen as a team expansion of SC NEC.
- August 10: Inland skippers block the waterways for 5 days in order to force a better arrangement on cargo-sharing. Police and navy lay on with an iron fist; the skippers end their actions without any results.
- September 6: The Gouwe-aqueduct is opened This viaduct enables a better traffic flow from the A12 state highway.

== Births ==
- 8 January: Virgil Spier, sprinter and hurdler
- 21 September: Martijn Buijsse, politician
- 23 September: Robert Doornbos, racing driver

== Sports ==
- 1980–81 Eredivisie
- 1980–81 Eerste Divisie
- 1980–81 KNVB Cup
- 1981 Amstel Gold Race
- The Netherlands men's national field hockey team are victorious at the 1981 Men's Hockey Champions Trophy in Karachi, Pakistan.
