= 1984 in the Netherlands =

- Decades: 1960s; 1970s; 1980s; 1990s; 2000s
- See also: Other events of 1984; History of the Netherlands

This article lists some of the events that took place in the Netherlands in 1984.

== Incumbents ==
- Monarch: Beatrix
- Prime Minister: Ruud Lubbers

== Events ==
- January 13: In Amsterdam and Utrecht a large number of people are infected with dysentery, after eating shrimps from Southeast Asia. 14 people in total don't survive the ordeal due to causes of the infection. So called 'home peeling' of shrimps, that guarantees too little hygiene becomes prohibited after this incident.
- February 10: Bram Peper the mayor of Rotterdam installs Jan van Dorp as new chief Commissioner of the Rotterdam police corps as successor of Albert Vermeij.
- February 25: The League of Communists in the Netherlands is established after a rift in the Communist Party of the Netherlands
- April 5: Sportscaster Theo Koomen dies in a car crash whilst returning from the FC Twente-MVV Maastricht match.
- April 14: Doe Maar stop and give two farewell concerts at the Maaspoort in 's-Hertogenbosch.
- May 31: The northern provinces, Overijssel and parts of Gelderland are struck by a large power outage at night that last for 2.5 hours. An exploding transformer in Ens is the cause of the outage. Stores in several places throughout the stricken zone are looted.
- June 14: The European Parliament election takes place.
- August 4: The first Summer Carnival is held in Rotterdam.
- September 7: The Dutch chapter of Doctors without borders is established.
- October 8: Bart Vos claims to be the first Dutchman to have climbed Mount Everest.
- October 12: Residents of 4 tower blocks in The Hague have to move. The cause of this forced removal is concrete decay. 20 flats have to be demolished in Zaandijk because of the same problem.
- November 1: Abortion is legalized through a new law.
- November 4: De Grote Broek is occupied in Nijmegen.
- November 26: During the TV action One for Africa, viewers donate 61 million guilders to alleviate the famine in the Sahel countries.
- December 10: The final rapport about the RSV-shipyard appears. The Van Dijk commission gives a hard judgment on minister of Economic affairs Gijs van Aardenne, who insufficiently provided the House of Representatives with information about the many subsidies the company received. The minister survives a vote of no-confidence, despite the rapport.
- December 14: The Netherlands men's national field hockey team end 4th at the Champions Trophy tournament in Karachi, Pakistan.

== Sport ==
- Netherlands at the 1984 Summer Olympics
- 1983–84 Eredivisie
- 1983–84 Eerste Divisie
- 1983–84 KNVB Cup
- 1984 Amstel Gold Race
- The Netherlands women's national field hockey team win the 1984 Women's EuroHockey Nations Championship in Lille, France, by beating the Soviet Union women's national field hockey team

== Births ==
- 6 March: Daniël de Ridder, association football player
- 7 March: Marciano Bruma, association football player
- 11 May: Marvin Wijks, footballer
- 13 May: Arend Kisteman, politician
- 9 September: Rosanne Hertzberger, politician
- 23 September: Anneliese van der Pol, actress
- 9 December: Jaap Schouten, rower
