= 1992 in the Netherlands =

- Decades: 1970s; 1980s; 1990s; 2000s; 2010s
- See also: Other events of 1992; History of the Netherlands

Events in the year 1992 in the Netherlands.

== Incumbents ==
- Monarch: Beatrix
- Prime Minister: Ruud Lubbers

== Events ==
- 9 April – The garden exhibition Floriade 1992 opens
- 13 April – The 1992 Roermond earthquake had a moment magnitude of 5.3 and a maximum Mercalli intensity of VII (Very strong).
- 16 September – Pension de Vogel homeless hostel fire
- 4 October – El Al Flight 1862, a cargo aircraft, crashed in the Bijlmermeer neighbourhood
- 30 November – The Hoofddorp train accident

== Births ==
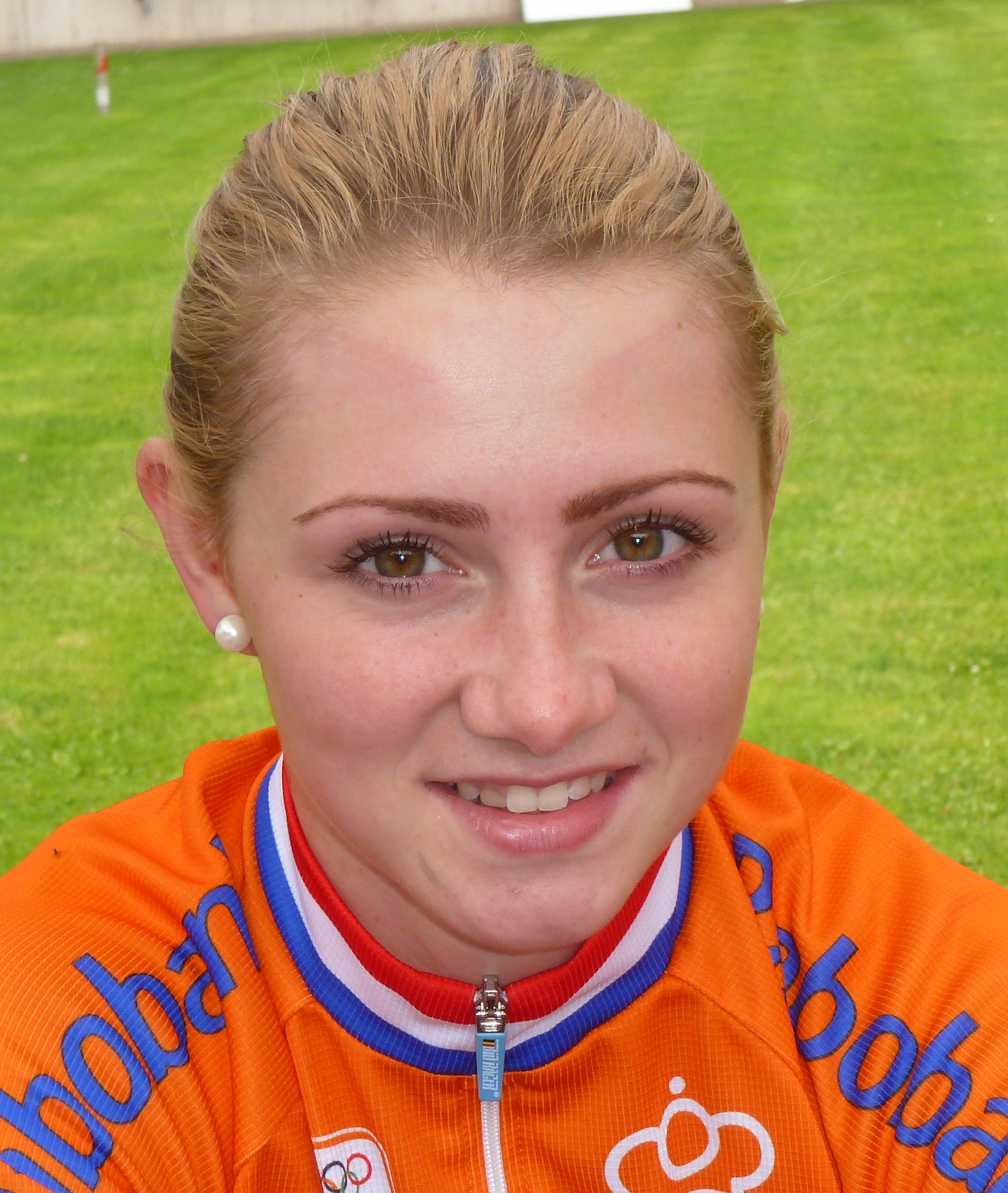
Yesna Rijkhoff

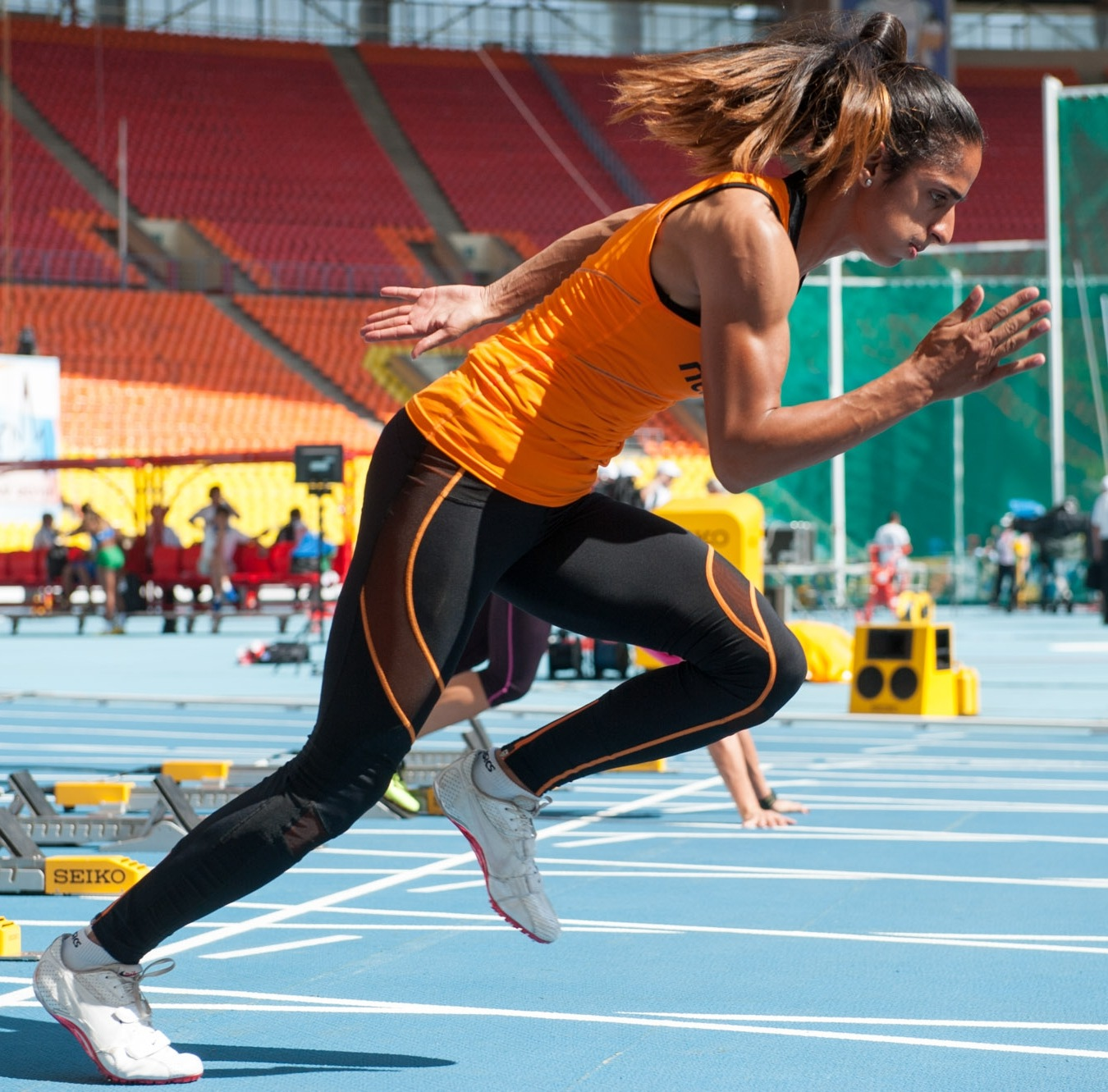
Madiea Ghafoor

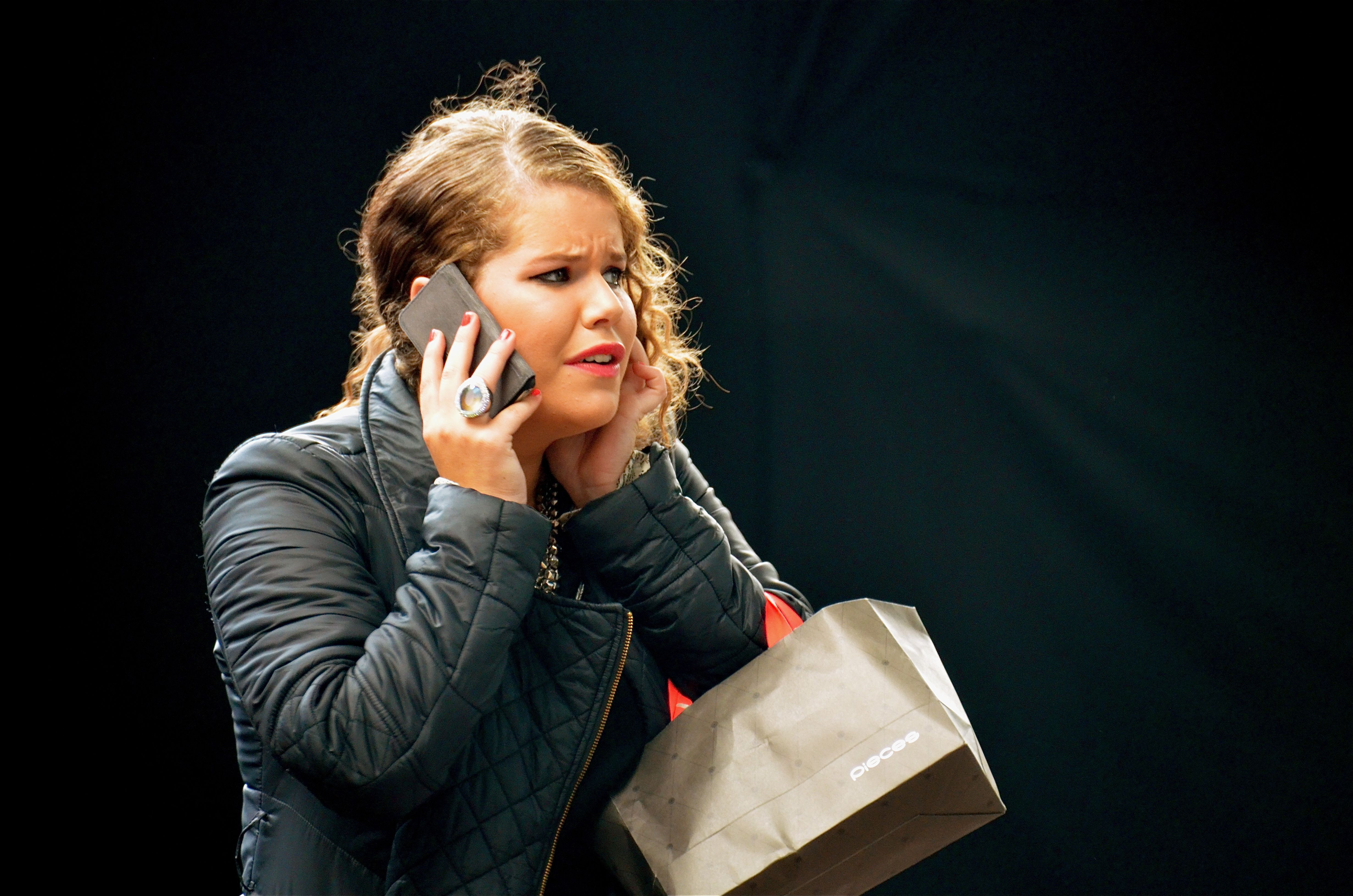
Iris Kroes

- 5 February – Nimir Abdel-Aziz, volleyball player
- 19 February – Sandro Silva, DJ and record producer
- 20 March – Rochelle Perts, singer
- 27 March – Doğukan Ergin, politician
- 1 April – Sieneke, singer
- 14 April – Josylvio, rapper
- 16 April – Ronnie Flex, hip hop performer and rapper
- 22 April – Dyro, DJ and EDM producer
- 9 May – Yesna Rijkhoff, track cyclist.
- 15 June – David van der Poel, road and cyclo-cross cyclist.
- 26 July – Mellony Geugjes, kickboxer and mixed martial artist
- 5 August – Estavana Polman, handball player.
- 7 August – Wout Weghorst, footballer
- 26 July – Costello van Steenis, mixed martial artist
- 13 August – Lois Abbingh, handball player.
- 26 August – Roy Kortsmit, footballer
- 9 September – Madiea Ghafoor, athlete.
- 14 September – Kirsten Knip, volleyball player
- 30 September – Bodine Koehler, musician
- 11 November – Iris Kroes, singer-songwriter and harpist
- 12 December – Douwe Bob, singer-songwriter
- 16 December - Chris Garia, sprinter and former baseball player

=== Full date missing ===
- Camiel Fortgens, fashion designer

== Deaths ==
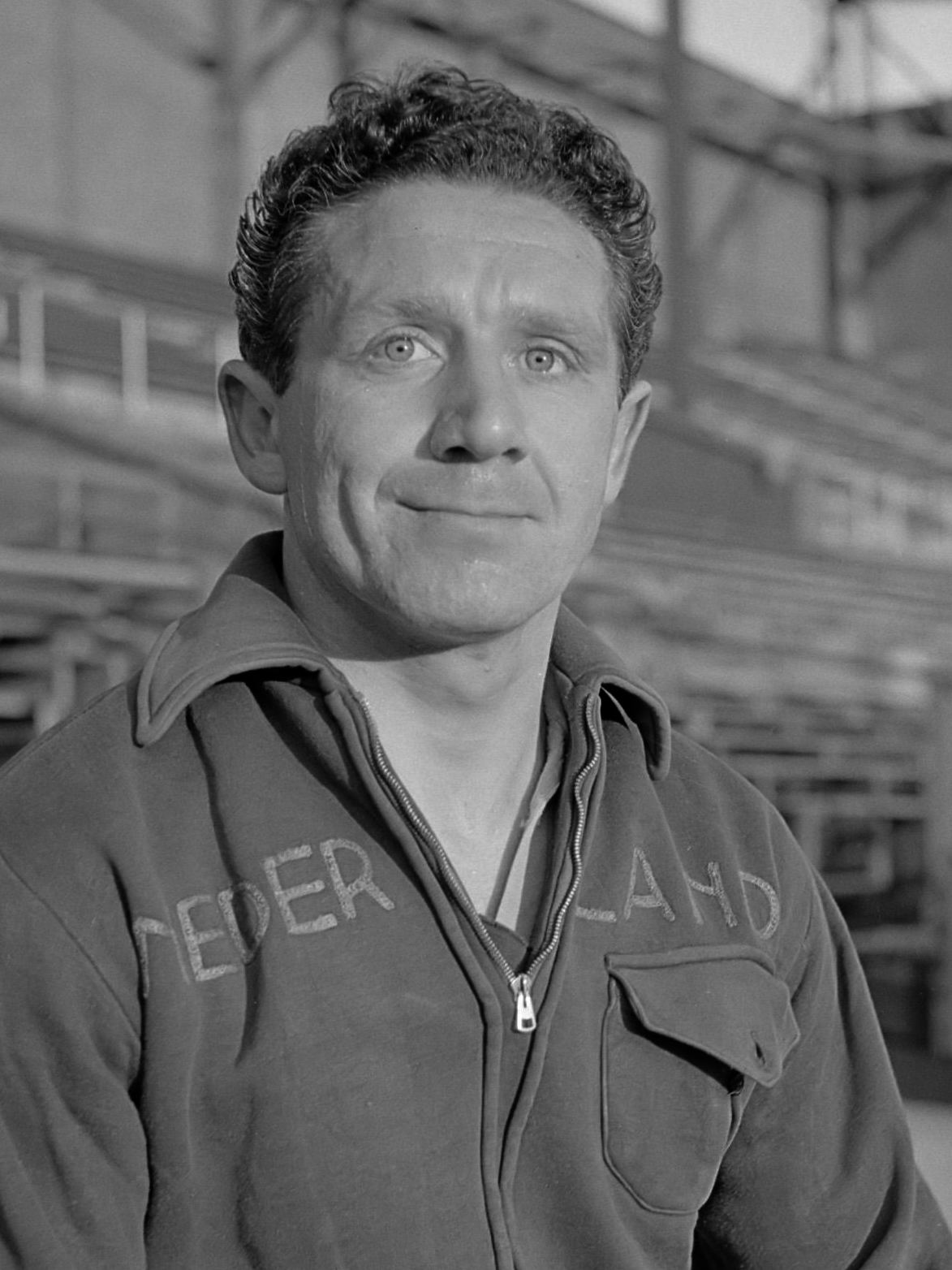
Rinus Terlouw

- 21 February – Kate ter Horst, the Angel of Arnhem (b. 1906)
- 8 March – Addeke Hendrik Boerma, civil servant (b. 1912)
- 15 March – Koos de Bruin, painter, draftsman, sculptor and graphic artist (b. 1941)
- 18 March – Cornelis Bastiaan Vaandrager, writer and poet (b. 1935)
- 20 March – Han Schröder, architect and educator (b. 1918)
- 20 April – Marcel Albers, motor racing driver (b. 1967)
- 30 June – Jan van Heteren, water polo player (b. 1916).
- 18 July – Jan Pelleboer, meteorologist and weather presenter (b. 1924)
- 17 December – Rinus Terlouw, footballer (b. 1922).
