= 1980 in the Netherlands =

- Decades: 1960s; 1970s; 1980s; 1990s; 2000s
- See also: Other events of 1980; History of the Netherlands

This article lists some of the events from 1980 related to the Netherlands.

== Incumbents ==
- Monarch: Juliana until April 30. After April 30 Beatrix
- Prime Minister: Dries van Agt

== Events ==
=== January ===
- 1: The Benelux-tunnel underneath the Nieuwe Maas (Vlaardingen/Schiedam - Hoogvliet) becomes toll free.
- 16: The striking ban for civil servants and the railways is abolished from Dutch law. This ban was part of the Abraham Kuyper strangle laws of 1903.
- 31: Queen Juliana announces that on April 30 she will abdicate in favor of her daughter Beatrix who will become 42 that day.

=== February ===
- 29: Vondelstraat Riots: In Amsterdam squatter riots break out when the police tries to remove squatters from their premise at the Vondelstraat. Street brawls go on for several days.

=== March ===
- 3: The army removes barricades after the mayor of Amsterdam assigns them to reconquer the Vondelstraat from the squatters.
- 4: Herman Bodde utters the famous words: Do we want to go to the Dam? Then we will go to the Dam. This happened during a laborers manifestation at the RAI complex in Amsterdam-South, the venue was moved there out of fear of squatter riots.
- 17: The Mobil unit ends the blockade at the Borsele nuclear plant.
- 19: King Juan Carlos of Spain arrives in the Netherlands for a state visit lasting 3 days. This was the first visit of a Spanish monarch on Dutch soil since Philip II of Spain in 1559.

=== April ===
- 1: The NOS officially begins airing Teletext
- 3: It's officially announced in Lekkerkerk that new residential neighborhood Lekkerkerk-West is built on a chemic waste dumping site. The 270 residing families are evacuated and temporarily housed elsewhere, after which the ground underneath the houses is dug up and sanitized.
- 21: The first angioplasty treatment takes place at the Saint Antonius Hospital in Utrecht.
- 30: The abdication of Queen Juliana in favor of her oldest daughter Beatrix. The inauguration of Beatrix as Queen of the Netherlands is marred by large riots known as the Kroningsoproer (see Amsterdam coronation riots).

=== May ===
- 8: In urban and regional public transportation strip tickets are implemented as part of the national tariff system.

=== June ===
- The Dutch lower house asks with a motion from Jan Nico Scholten to boycott oil from South Africa. Minister Van der Klaauw advised against the motion, and will not execute it.
- 21: Princess Margriet opens the 1980 Paralympics in Arnhem.
- 25: Prime minister Dries van Agt hands the 37 first inhabitants of Almere their house keys.

=== July ===
- 25: Winsum train disaster: Two trains collide between the villages Winsum and Sauwerd, resulting in 9 casualties.

=== September ===
- 9: Establishment of the Dutch Language Union.
- 13: Bart van Kampen establishes the Black Market in Beverwijk.

=== October ===
11: A merger meeting between the ARP, CHU and KVP results in the new political party CDA.

=== December ===
- 28: Scapegoat Marinus van der Lubbe, is posthumously acquitted for setting fire to the German Reichstag building.

== Sports ==
- 1979–80 Eredivisie
- 1979–80 Eerste Divisie
- 1979–80 KNVB Cup
- 1980 Amstel Gold Race
- Netherlands at the 1980 Summer Olympics

== Births ==
- 6 February – Deborah Louz, taekwondo practitioner
- 15 April – Agnes Joseph, Dutch politician
- 23 April – Nicole den Dulk, Paralympic equestrian
- 17 May – Alistair Overeem, professional mixed martial artist and kickboxer
- 22 July – Dirk Kuyt, football manager
- 17 August – Jan Kromkamp, football manager
