= 1991 in the Netherlands =

- Decades: 1970s; 1980s; 1990s; 2000s; 2010s
- See also: Other events of 1991; History of the Netherlands

Events in the year 1991 in the Netherlands.

== Incumbents ==
- Monarch: Beatrix
- Prime Minister: Ruud Lubbers

== Events ==
- 14 February – Culemborg fireworks disaster
- 16 to 20 July – The 1991 European Women's Cricket Championship was held in Haarlem

== Births ==
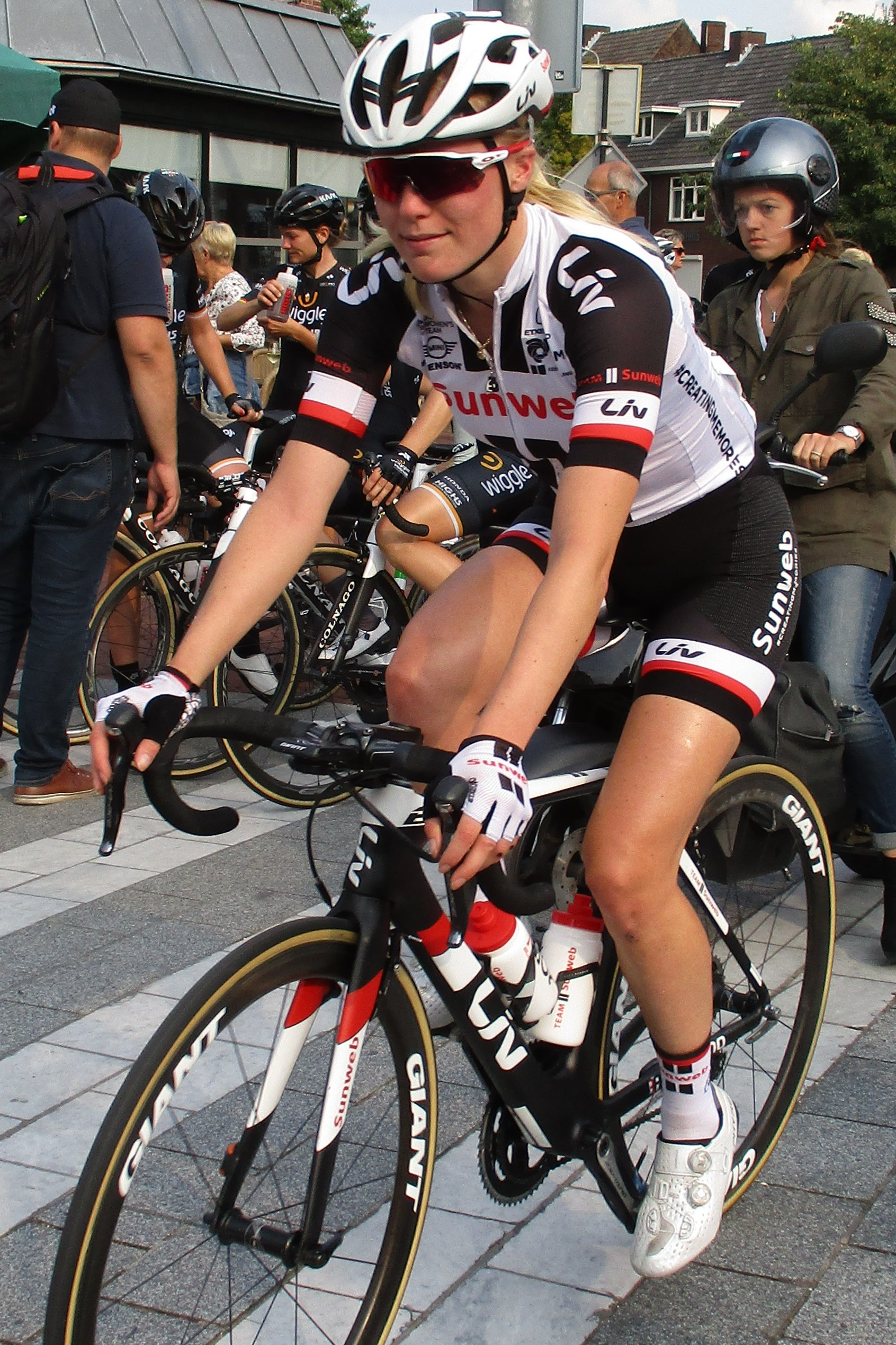
Rozanne Slik

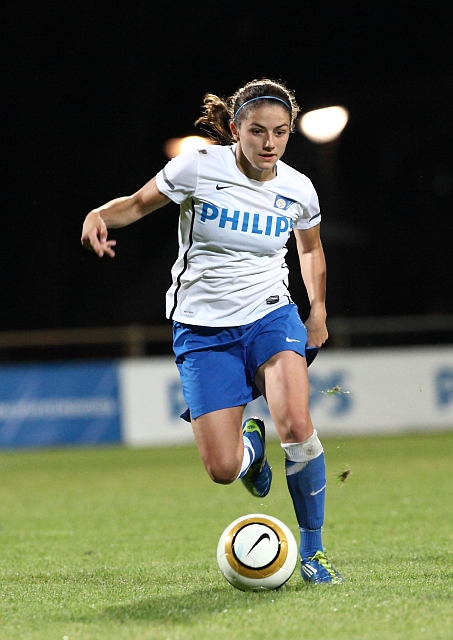
Daniëlle van de Donk

- 5 January – Anne Terpstra, cross-country cyclist
- 24 January – Jett Rebel, singer-songwriter, composer, multi-instrumentalist and recording artist
- 29 January – Rachel de Haze, handball player.
- 31 January – Nicole Koolhaas, volleyball player
- 13 February – Glenn Coldenhoff, motocross racer
- 23 February – Chatilla van Grinsven, basketball player
- 16 March – Catharina van der Sloot, water polo player
- 12 April – Rozanne Slik, racing cyclist.
- 14 April – Melisa Aslı Pamuk, beauty pageant titleholder, actress and model
- 5 May – Robin de Kruijf, volleyball player
- 7 May – Wouter ter Maat, volleyball player
- 13 June – Ricardo van Rhijn, footballer
- 28 July – Isabelle Jongenelen, handball player.
- 5 August – Daniëlle van de Donk, footballer
- 21 August – Tess Gaerthé, singer
- 27 August – Robbert de Greef, cyclist (d. 2019).
- 8 September – Luis Tavares, kickboxer
- 19 September – Michael Kok, basketball player
- 8 October – Bakermat, DJ and music producer
- 13 November – Jeffrey Bruma, footballer
- 20 November – Jeanine Stoeten, volleyball player
- 24 November - Ted Heijckmann, footballer
- 19 December – Steven Berghuis, footballer
- 25 December – Gaite Jansen, actress

=== Full date missing ===
- Mano Bouzamour, novelist and columnist

== Deaths ==
- 24 March – Adrie Zwartepoorte, cyclist (b. 1917).
- 5 June – Frederik Belinfante, physicist (b. 1913)
- 27 June – Klaas Bruinsma, drug lord (b. 1953)
- 1 July – Joost Baljeu, painter, sculptor and writer (b. 1925)
- 5 September – Peter Slaghuis, DJ and music producer (b. 1961)
- 11 September – Jan van Gemert, painter, graphic artist, sculptor, glass artist and ceramist (b. 1921)
- 22 September – Fons Steuten, cyclist (b. 1938).

=== Full date missing ===
- Jan Kagie, painter (b. 1907)
