= 1995 in the Netherlands =

- Decades: 1970s; 1980s; 1990s; 2000s; 2010s
- See also: Other events of 1995; History of the Netherlands

Events in the year 1995 in the Netherlands.

== Incumbents ==
- Monarch: Beatrix
- Prime Minister: Wim Kok

== Events ==
- 18 to 23 July – The 1995 World Fencing Championships were held in The Hague.
- 1 to 11 August – The 18th World Scout Jamboree was held in Dronten.

== Births ==
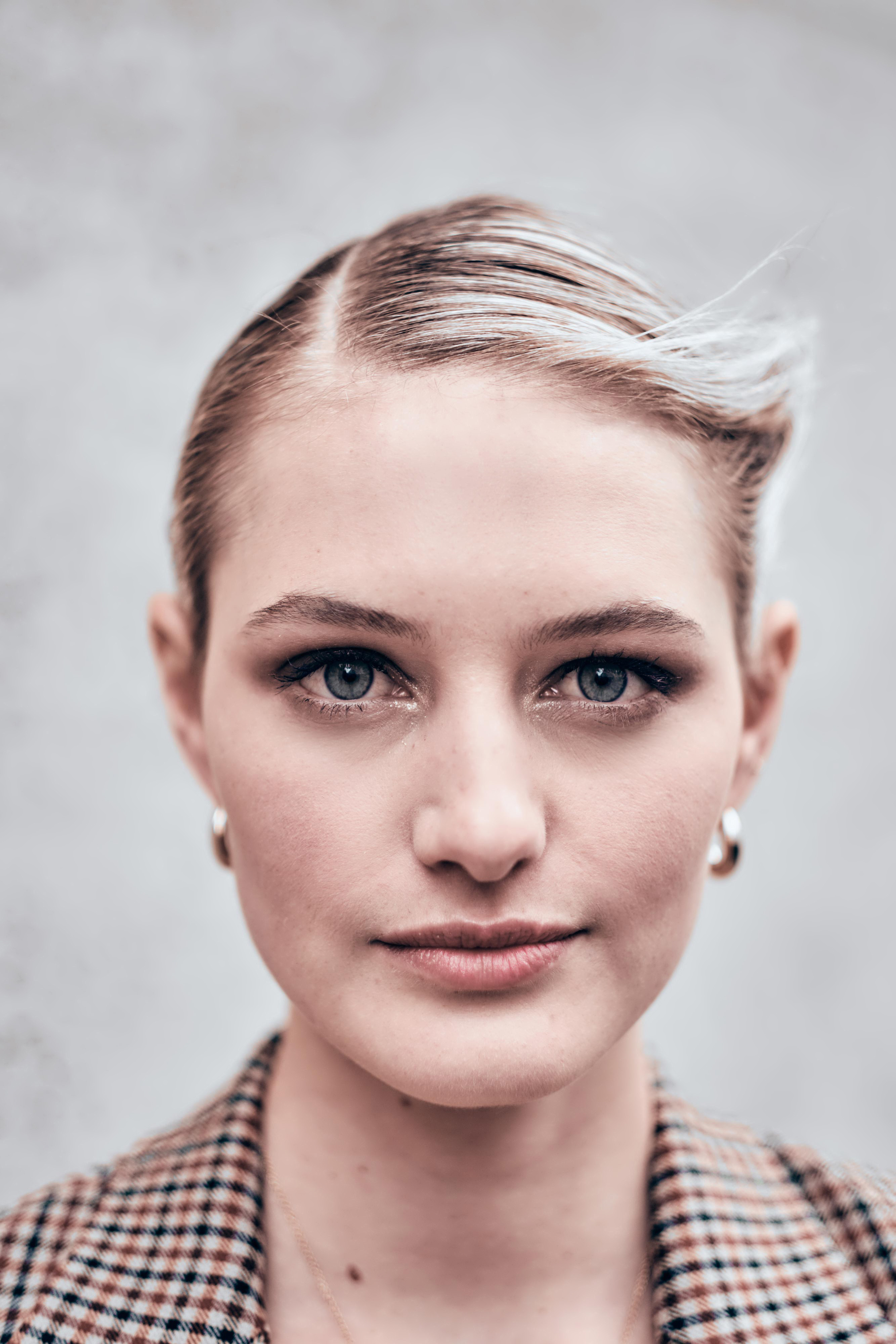
Sanne Vloet

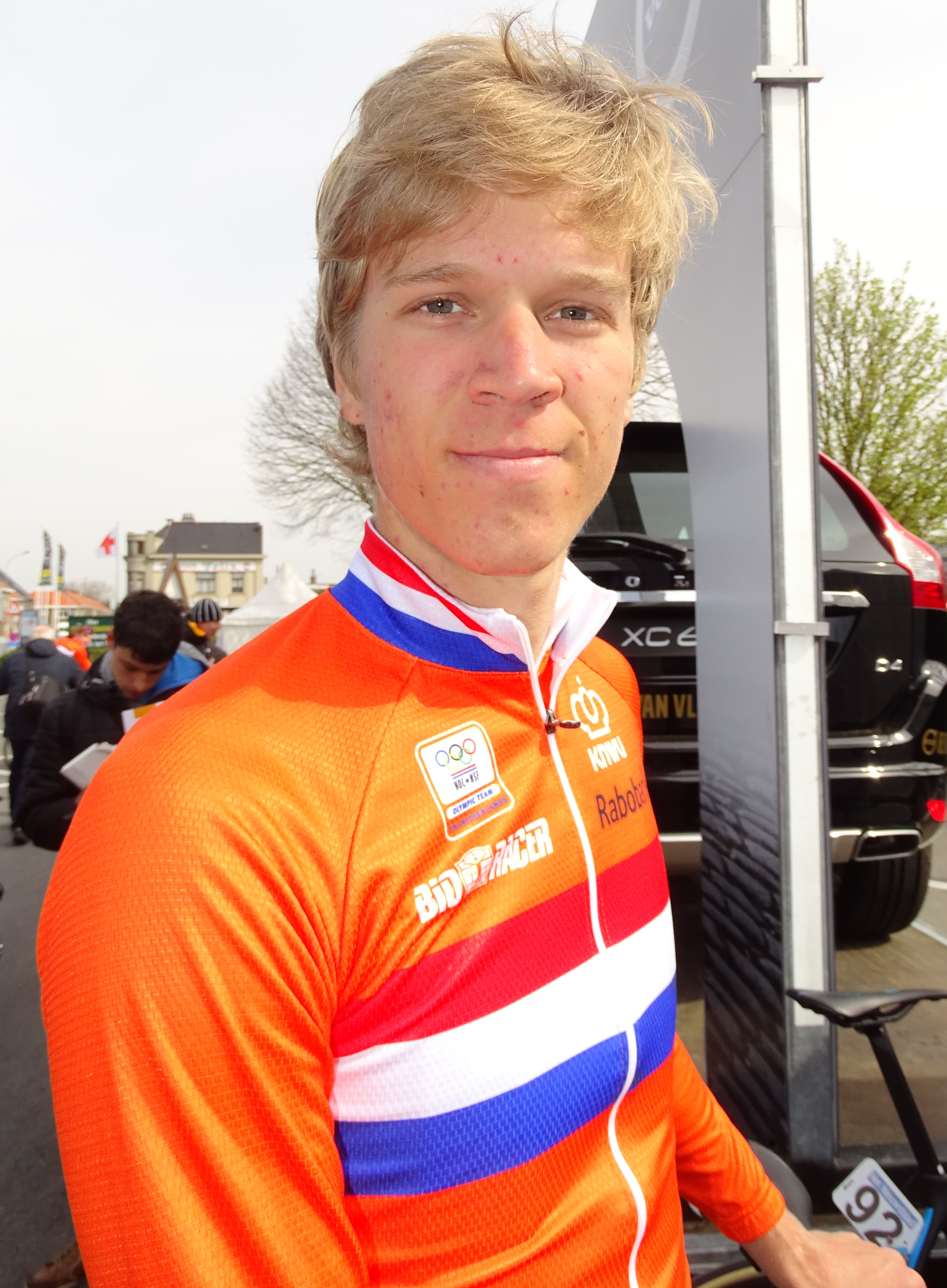
Cees Bol

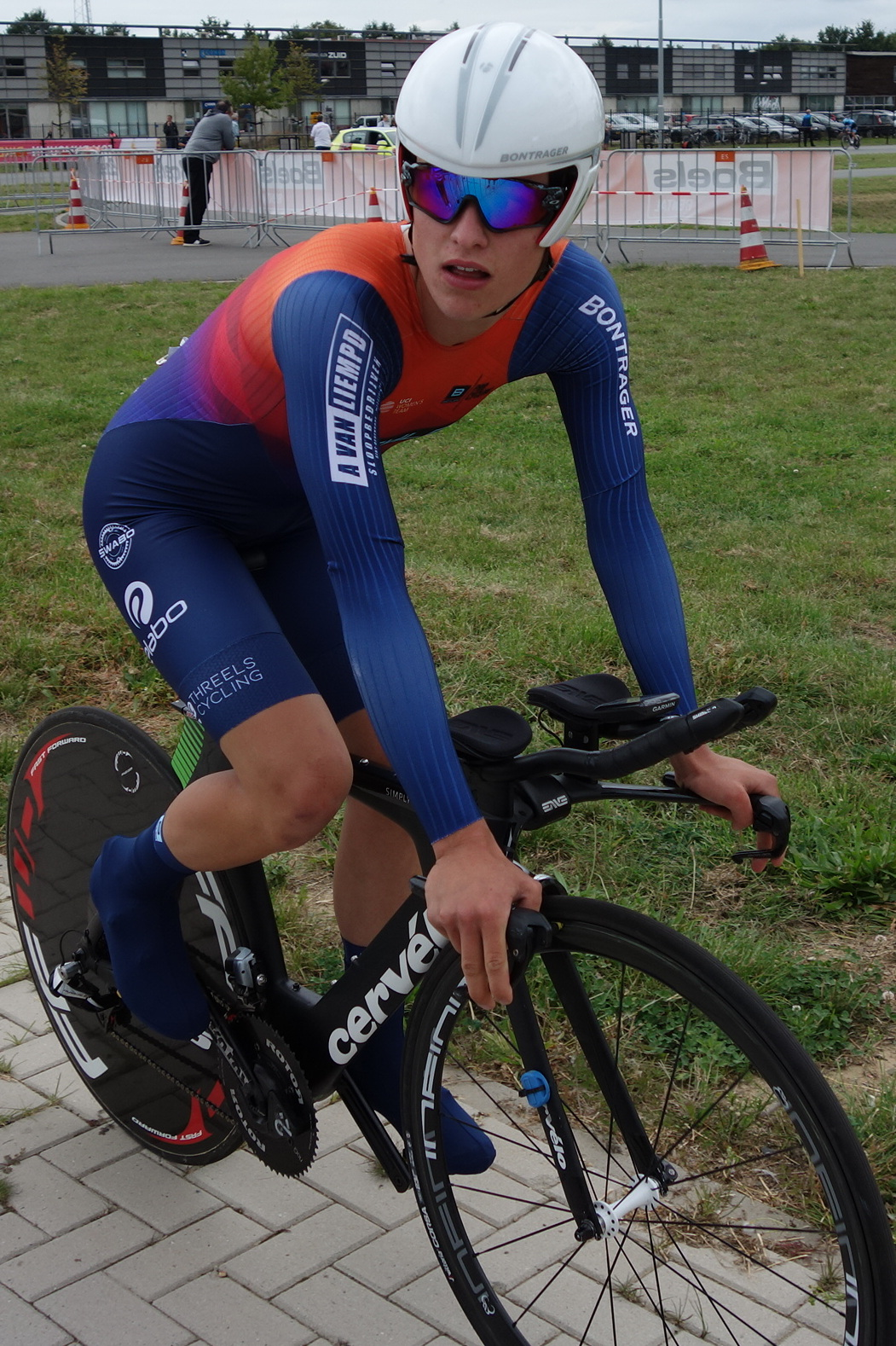
Teuntje Beekhuis

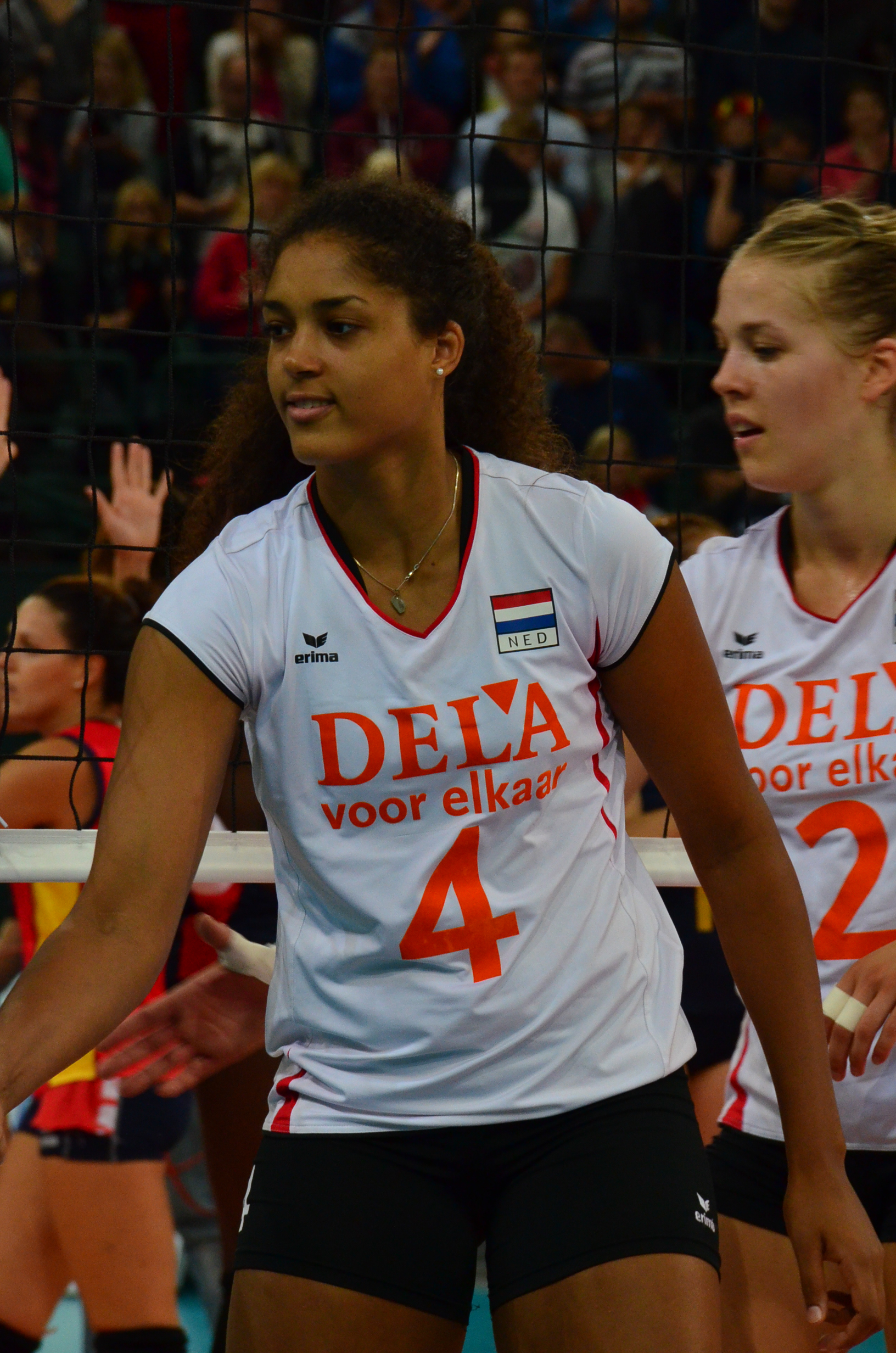
Celeste Plak

- 1 January – Kelly Vollebregt, handball player
- 9 January – Loiza Lamers, model
- 17 January – Jim van der Zee, singer
- 22 January – Jessie Jazz Vuijk, model and beauty pageant titleholder
- 25 January – Mark Caljouw, badminton player
- 1 February – Oliver Heldens, DJ and electronic music producer
- 2 February – Mikal Tseggai, politician
- 3 February – Stijn Derkx, footballer
- 3 February – Bram Verhofstad, artistic gymnast
- 6 February – Nyck de Vries, racing driver
- 6 February – Jorrit Hendrix, footballer
- 18 February – Nathan Aké, footballer
- 2 March – Marije van Hunenstijn, sprinter
- 10 March – Sanne Vloet, model
- 28 March – Hamza Boukhari, footballer
- 21 March - Chadwick Tromp, baseball player
- 9 April – Demi Vermeulen, Paralympic equestrian
- 12 April – Melissa Venema, trumpeter
- 28 April – Derk Telnekes, darts player
- 1 May – Milan Vissie, footballer
- 7 June – Bas Veenstra, basketball player
- 1 July – Julius van Sauers, basketball player
- 2 July – Vinnie Vermeer, footballer
- 13 July – Glenn Bijl, footballer
- 15 July – Stef Krul, racing cyclist
- 19 July – Tom Noordhoff, footballer
- 19 July – Romee Strijd, model
- 21 July – Melissa Wijfje, speed skater
- 27 July – Cees Bol, cyclist
- 18 August – Teuntje Beekhuis, cyclist
- 20 August – Julian Jordan, musician
- 29 August – Dante Klein, DJ and record producer
- 2 October – Anne van Dam, golf player
- 3 October – Snelle, rapper and singer
- 4 October – Ralf Mackenbach, singer, dancer and musical artist
- 9 October – Kenny Tete, footballer
- 22 October – Arno Kamminga, swimmer
- 26 October – Celeste Plak, volleyball player
- 7 November – Justin Mylo, DJ, record producer and musician
- 12 November – Davina Michelle, singer and YouTuber
- 22 November – Jeremy Mooiman, politician
- 25 November – Denzel Comenentia, athlete specializing in hammer throw and shot put

== Deaths ==
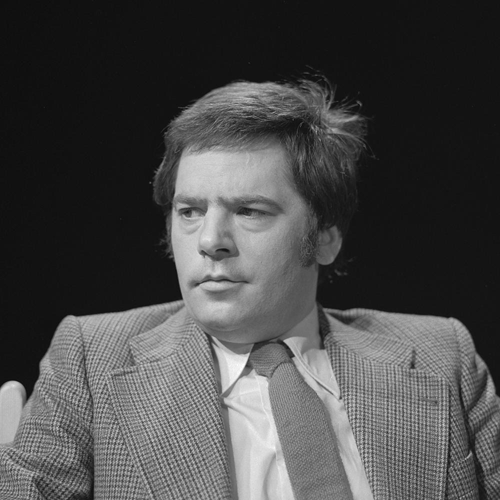
Ischa Meijer

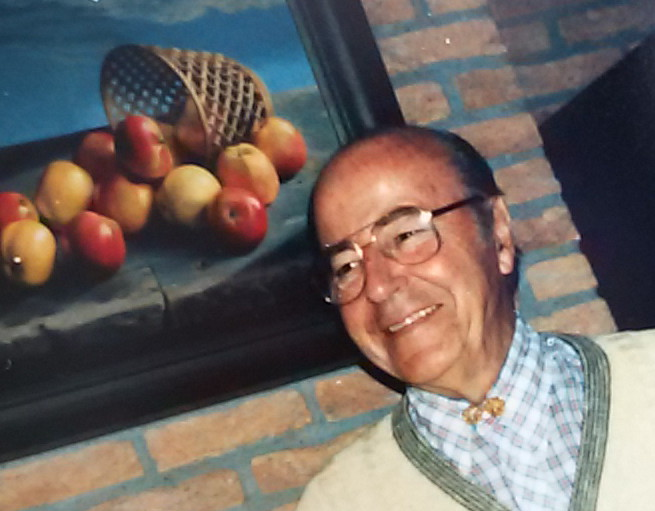
Lodewijk Bruckman

- 14 February – Ischa Meijer, journalist, television presenter, radio presenter, critic and author (b. 1943)
- 19 February – David Adriaan van Dorp, chemist (b. 1915)
- 25 March – John Hugenholtz, designer of race tracks and cars (b. 1914)
- 27 March – Tony Lovink, diplomat (b. 1902)
- 24 April – Lodewijk Bruckman, painter (b. 1903).
- 26 April – Frieda Belinfante, cellist and conductor (b. 1904)
- 21 May – Annie M. G. Schmidt, writer (b. 1911)
- 10 August – Gijs van Aardenne, politician (b. 1930)

=== Full date missing ===
- Nico de Haas, photographer (b. 1907)
