= 1994 in the Netherlands =

- Decades: 1970s; 1980s; 1990s; 2000s; 2010s
- See also: Other events of 1994; History of the Netherlands

Events in the year 1994 in the Netherlands.

== Incumbents ==
- Monarch: Beatrix
- Prime Minister: Ruud Lubbers (until 22 August); Wim Kok (from 22 August)

== Events ==
- 1 April - The Police Act of 1993 takes effect. The Rijkspolitie (English: National Police), which had existed since 1945, is replaced by the Korps landelijke politiediensten (KLPD), which would exist until 2013.
- 4 April – The KLM Cityhopper Flight 433 crashed during an emergency landing.
- 10 to 17 April – The 1994 European Badminton Championships were held in Den Bosch.
- 22 August – Wim Kok takes over as the new prime minister.

== Births ==
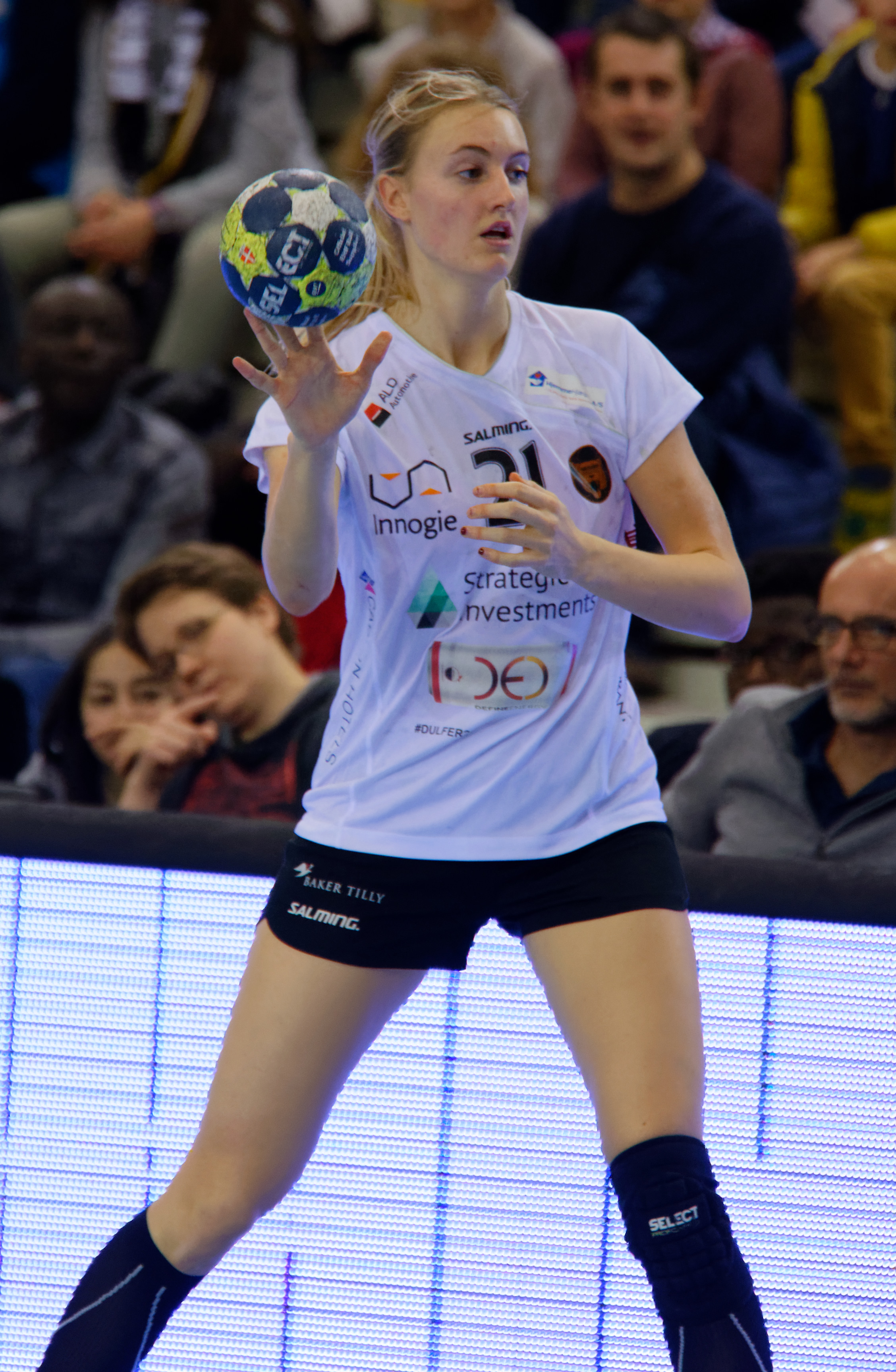
Kelly Dulfer

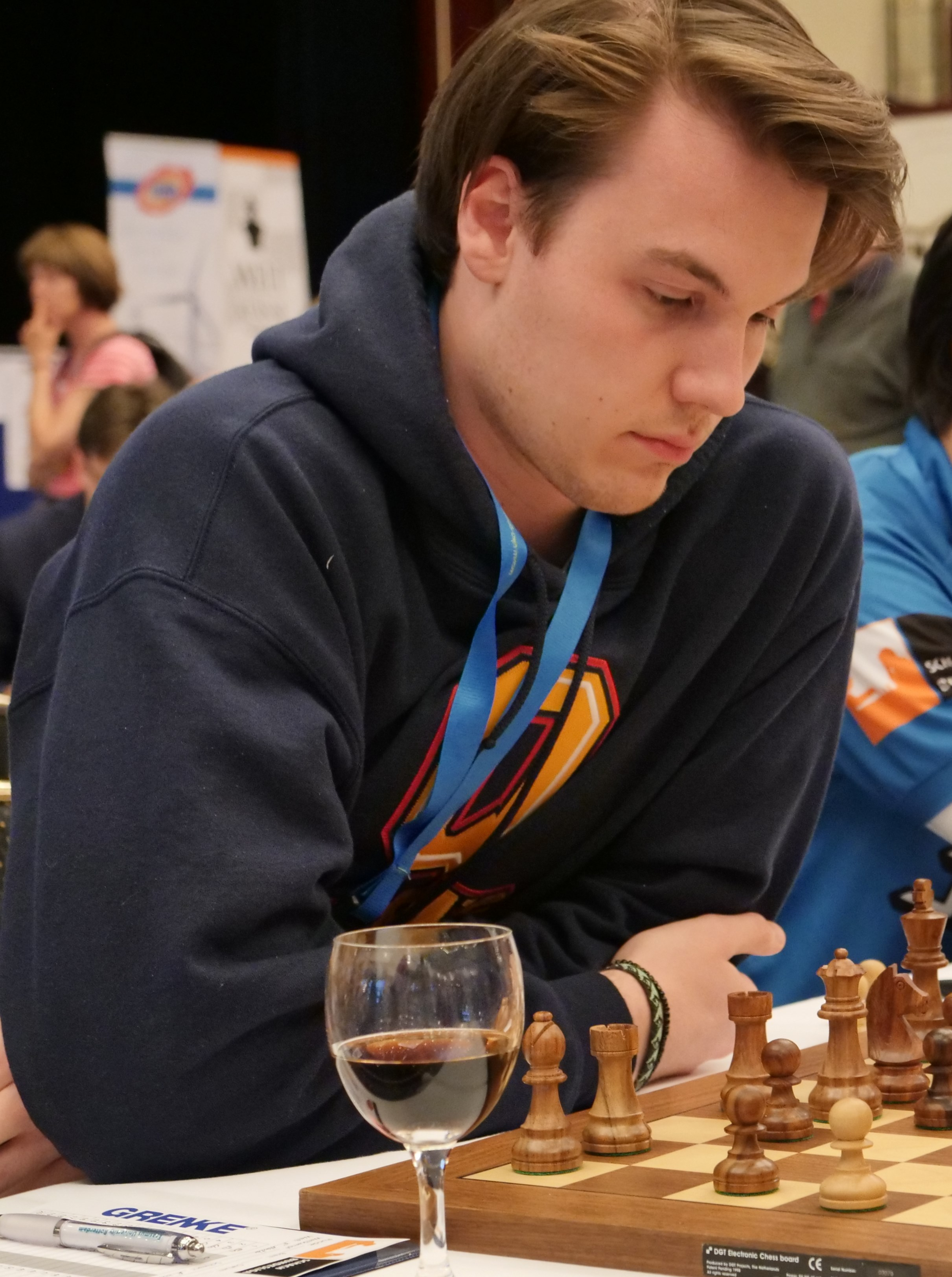
Robin van Kampen

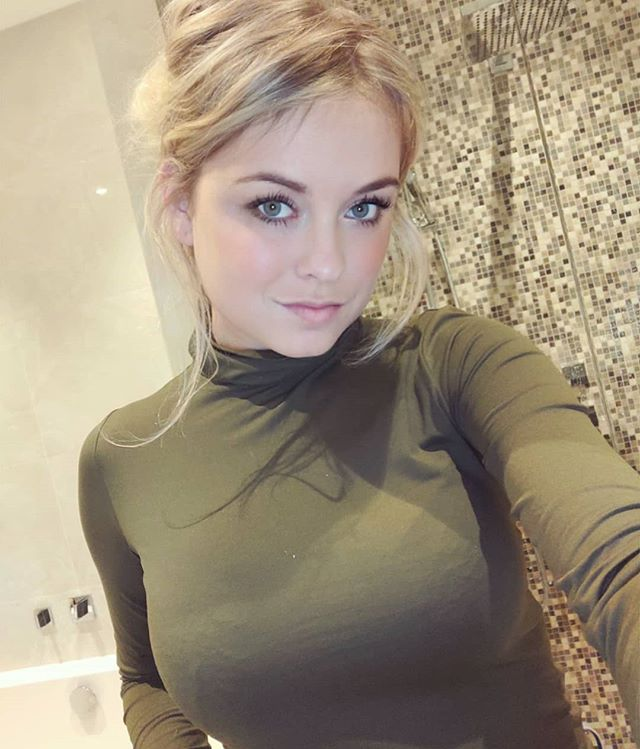
Sylvana IJsselmuiden

- 10 February – Roel Mannaart, kickboxer
- 13 February – Danzell Gravenberch, footballer
- 17 February – Yasmin Verheijen, designer, model and beauty pageant titleholder
- 2 March – NikkieTutorials, makeup artist and beauty vlogger
- 20 March – Joshua Brenet, footballer
- 21 March – Kelly Dulfer, handball player.
- 21 March – Arvid de Kleijn, cyclist.
- 22 March – Jean-Paul Boëtius, footballer
- 23 March – Jito Kok, basketball player
- 11 April – Duncan Laurence, singer-songwriter
- 29 April – Antwan Tolhoek, cyclist.
- 20 May – Abbey Hoes, film and television actress
- 22 May – Kira Toussaint, competitive swimmer.
- 2 June – Dennis van Aarssen, singer
- 15 June – Vincent Janssen, footballer
- 16 June – Rezar, wrestler
- 21 June – Vincent de Vries, badminton player
- 24 June – Janieck Devy, singer-songwriter, musician and actor
- 2 July – Jason van Dalen, cyclist.
- 22 July – Shane Hammink, basketball player
- 27 July – Boyan Slat, inventor and entrepreneur
- 28 July – Sven van Beek, footballer
- 1 August – Arjan Knipping, swimmer
- 17 August – Dai Dai Ntab, speed skater
- 6 September – D-Wayne, house music DJ and music producer
- 12 September – Jeffrey Herlings, motocross rider
- 17 September – Inger Smits, handball player.
- 23 September – Jesse Six Dijkstra, politician
- 25 September – Kai Verbij, speed skater
- 15 October – Lil' Kleine, musician
- 22 October – Carline van Breugel, politician
- 14 November – Robin van Kampen, chess player.
- 24 November – Sylvana IJsselmuiden, model, television presenter and actress
- 18 December – Roosmarijn de Kok, fashion model
- 31 December – Tamara van Vliet, swimmer

=== Full date missing ===
- Rahima Ayla Dirkse, model and beauty pageant titleholder
- Nora El Koussour, actress

== Deaths ==
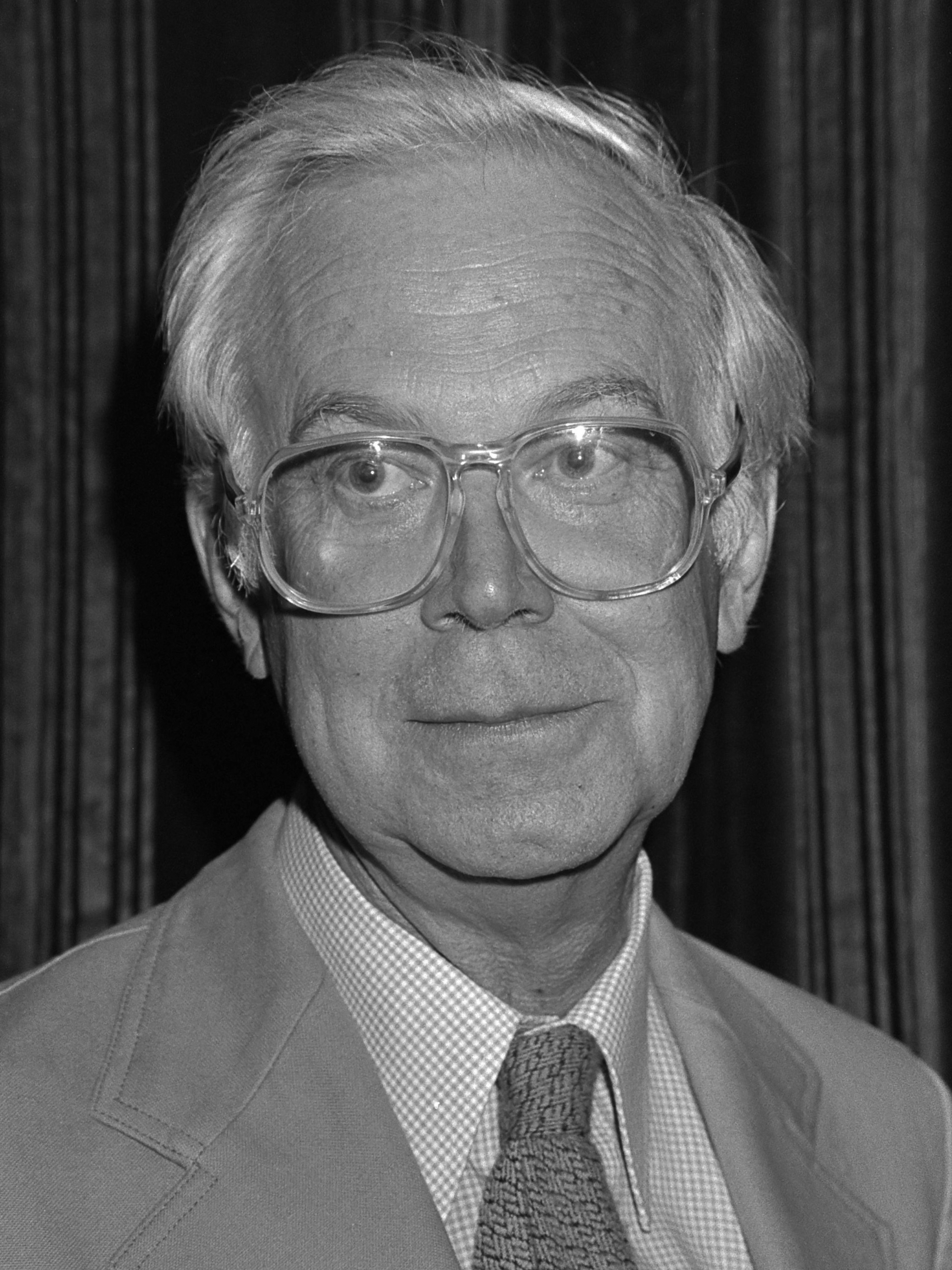
Joop Klant

- 30 January – Jan Schaefer, politician (b. 1940)
- 19 February – Renske Vellinga, speed skater (b. 1974)
- 21 May – Johan Hendrik Weidner, war hero (b. 1912)
- 24 July – Leo Brongersma, zoologist, herpetologist, author, and lecturer (b. 1907)
- 23 September – Johannes van Damme, engineer and businessman (b. 1935)
- c.9 September – Joop Wilhelmus, pornographer and entrepreneur (b. 1943)
- 14 September – David van de Kop, painter, draftsman and sculptor (b. 1937)
- 26 December – Joop Klant, economist, novelist and professor of political economy (b. 1915)
