= 1986 in the Netherlands =

- Decades: 1960s; 1970s; 1980s; 1990s; 2000s
- See also: Other events of 1986; History of the Netherlands

This article lists some of the events from 1986 related to the Netherlands.

== Incumbents ==
- Monarch: Beatrix
- Prime Minister: Ruud Lubbers

== Events ==
- 21 May - 1986 Dutch general election.

== Music ==
- List of Dutch Top 40 number-one singles of 1986

== Births ==
- 14 July - Marina Vondeling, politician
