= 1987 in the Netherlands =

- Decades: 1960s; 1970s; 1980s; 1990s; 2000s
- See also: Other events of 1987; History of the Netherlands

This article lists some of the events that took place in the Netherlands in 1987.

== Incumbents ==
- Monarch: Beatrix
- Prime Minister: Ruud Lubbers

== Events ==
- January 1: Reflectors on each side of your tires become mandatory when you’re cycling.
- January 31: During the 59th Academy Awards, The Assault wins the award for best none-English film. This was the first time a Dutch film would win an Academy Award. Director/producer Fons Rademakers receives the Oscar from actor Anthony Quinn.
- February 8: The Netherlands Open Air Museum in Arnhem opens for free in an attempt to prevent closure.
- February 14/15: A speed-skating world championship is held for the first time in a covered ice hall, it's held in Heerenveen in the brand new Thialf-stadium. Leo Visser sets a new world record on the 5 kilometer.
- February 22: Valérie Albada Jelgersma is freed after she was kidnapped. Her father is Eric Albada Jelgersma owner of Unigro.
- March 2: The province of Drenthe is struck by an extreme amount of glazed frost. Objects were covered are covered by a 1 centimeter thick layer of ice. Trees and high voltage pylons snap. This event is known as the IJzelramp of 1987.
- March 21: Soccer player Ruud Gullit is transferred by PSV to AC Milan for a record fee of 17 million Dutch Guilder.
- April 5: The Netherlands end 7th at the world championship ice hockey for B-countries in Italy and relegate to the C-Division.
- May 13: Ajax wins the UEFA Cup Winners' Cup in Athens by beating Lokomotiv Leipzig in the final with 1–0. Marco van Basten scores the only goal of the match after 21 minutes.
- June 8: In a short amount of time several child abuse scandals are uncovered. The worst case is in Oude Pekela were approximately 70 children are abused by several adults. The perpetrators were never found.
- June 27: Egbert Streuer and Bernard Schnieders are victorious in the sidecar class of the Dutch TT.
- August 30: The Netherlands men's national field hockey team prolong the European title in Moscow by beating England after penalty shots in the final.
- September 5: The homo-monument in Amsterdam is revealed, in memory of prosecuted gay men during the Nazi era.
- September 7: Klaas de Jonge gets to leave South Africa after being in hiding for two years at the Dutch embassy in Pretoria. De Jonge is suspected of supporting forbidden black resistance movement ANC.
- September 9: Ferdi E. abducts Ahold top executive Gerrit Jan Heijn on his own and murders him the same day. The abduction keeps the country in suspense for many months until Ferdi E. is arrested in April 1988.
- September 13: The Netherlands women's national field hockey team clinch the European title by beating host nation England in London after penalty shots.
- September 22: Shipyard P. Smit Jr. in Rotterdam is declared bankrupt.
- October: Pediatrician Guus de Jonge publishes groundbreaking article about Sudden Infant Death Syndrome. He advises to put infants in the supine position.
- October 28: A bomb incident occurs during the EC qualification match between the Netherlands and Cyprus. Despite heavy protest of the Greek FA the score isn't converted to regulatory 0–3 defeat for the Dutch. According to the UEFA the match will be redone. The Dutch qualify because of this for the UEFA Euro 1988 in West Germany.

== Sport ==
=== Hosted of international sport events by the Netherlands ===
- 1987 Amstel Gold Race
- 1987 Dutch Open (tennis)
- 1987 World Artistic Gymnastics Championships in Rotterdam
- 1987 Korfball World Championship
- 1987 Ronde van Nederland
- 1987 Individual Speedway World Championship
- 1987 Women's Hockey Champions Trophy
- 1987 ABN World Tennis Tournament

=== Football ===
- 1986–87 Eredivisie
- 1986–87 Eerste Divisie
- 1986–87 KNVB Cup

== Births ==
- 11 February
  - Ellen van Dijk, cyclist
  - Jan Smeekens, speed skater
- 4 May – Ilana Rooderkerk, actress and politician
- 6 August – Joran van der Sloot, murder suspect
- 10 August – Jim Bakkum, singer
- 19 September – Claire Martens, politician
- 9 November – Nouchka Fontijn, boxer

== See also ==
- List of Dutch Top 40 number-one singles of 1987
- Netherlands in the Eurovision Song Contest 1987
