= 1990 in the Netherlands =

- Decades: 1970s; 1980s; 1990s; 2000s; 2010s
- See also: Other events of 1990; History of the Netherlands

Events in the year 1990 in the Netherlands.

== Incumbents ==
- Monarch: Beatrix
- Prime Minister: Ruud Lubbers

== Events ==
- 25 to 26 January – Burns' Day Storm
- February–March - Culmination of the 1989–1990 Dutch farmers' protests
- 27 May – Killings of Nick Spanos and Stephen Melrose

== Births ==
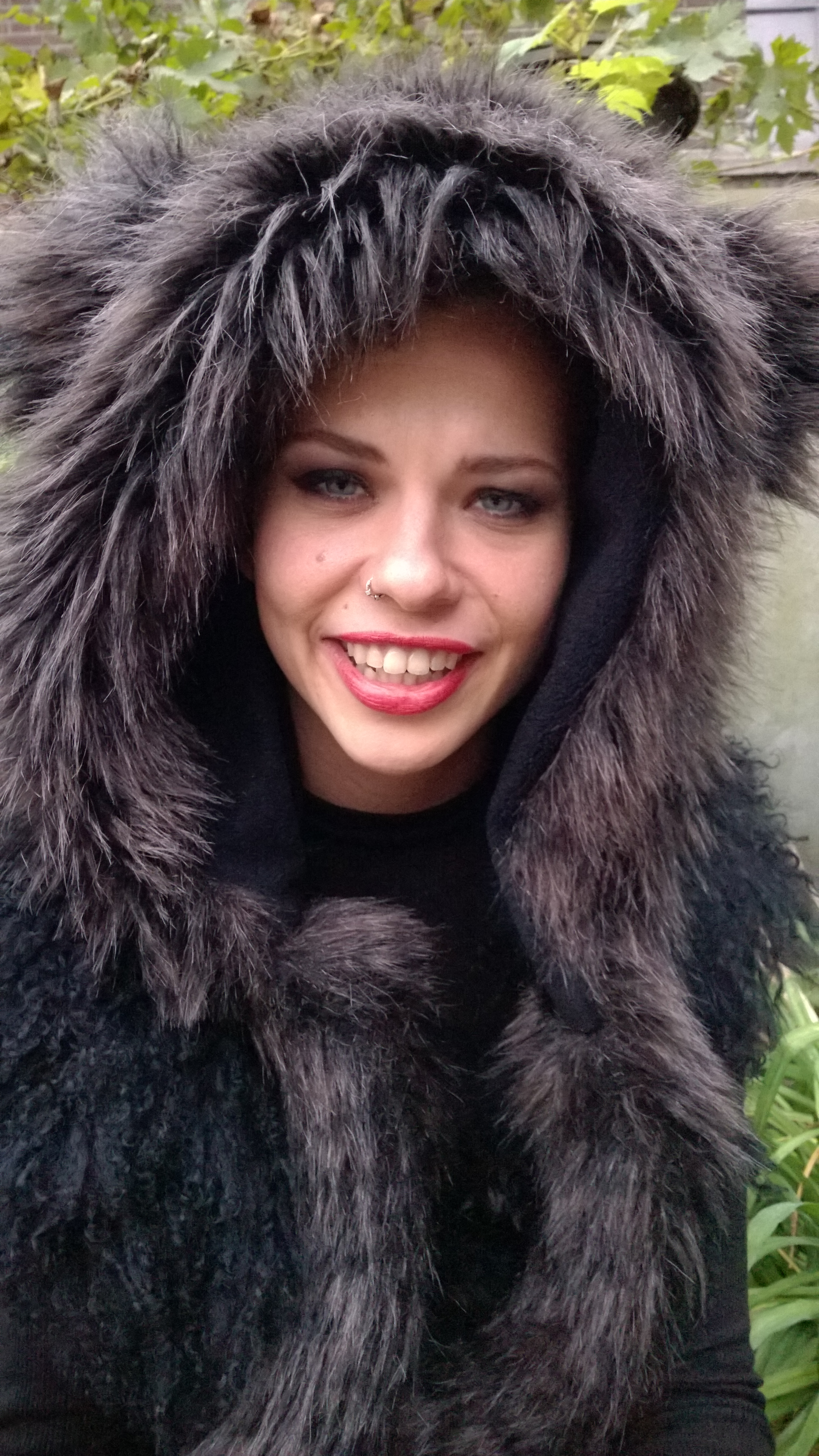
Sharon Kovacs

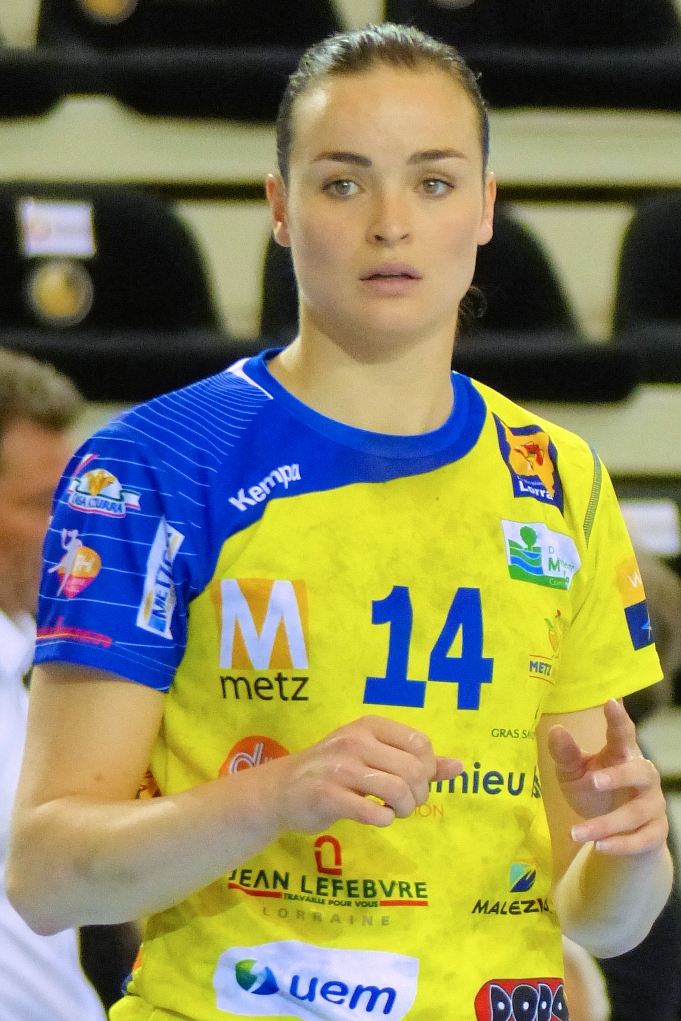
Yvette Broch

- 22 January – Michael Duut, kickboxer
- 16 February – Jessy Kramer, handballer.
- 2 April – Avalon-Chanel Weyzig, model
- 5 April – Género Zeefuik, footballer
- 15 April – Sharon Kovacs, singer
- 28 April – Robbert Andringa, volleyball player
- 5 May – Martine Smeets, handballer.
- 22 May – Danick Snelder, handballer.
- 27 June – Laura van der Heijden, handballer.
- 24 July – Iso Sluijters, handball player.
- 17 September – Radical Redemption, DJ and record producer
- 21 September – Jantine Annika Heij, songwriter, vocalist, keyboardist and producer
- 16 October – Sand Van Roy, actress
- 25 November – Anouchka Delon, actress
- 26 November – San Holo, DJ, musician, record producer and composer
- 9 December – Debbie Bont, handballer.
- 10 December – Jason Wilnis, kickboxer
- 12 December – Stephanie Tency, actress
- 21 December – Yvette Broch, handball player.

== Deaths ==
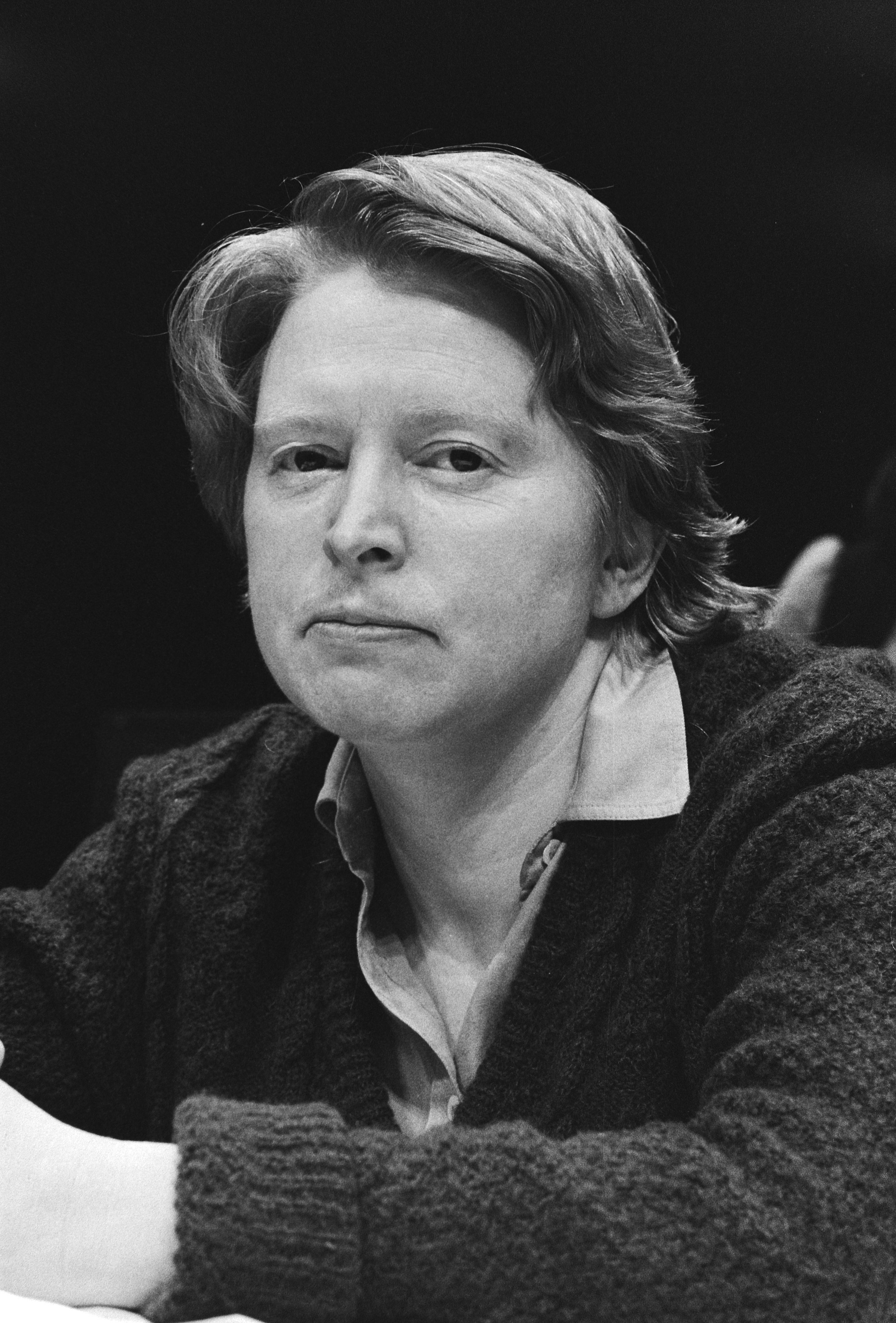
Annelien Kappeyne van de Coppello

- 4 January – Alois Miedl, art dealer (b. 1903)
- 4 January – Wim Volkers, footballer (b. 1899)
- 23 February – Annelien Kappeyne van de Coppello, politician (b. 1936)
- 27 February – Johannes Draaijer, cyclist (b. 1963)
- 24 May – Dries van der Lof, racing driver (b. 1919)
- 7 August – Phiny Dick, illustrator and writer of children's books and comics (b. 1912).
- 30 August – Bernard D. H. Tellegen, electrical engineer, inventor (b. 1900)
