= Ted Heijckmann =

Dutch footballer

Personal information
- Full name: Ted Heijckmann
- Date of birth: 24 November 1991 (age 34)
- Place of birth: Arnhem, Netherlands
- Position: Winger

Team information
- Current team: SV de Paasberg

Youth career
- VV Jonge Kracht
- Vitesse

Senior career*
Years	Team	Apps	(Gls)
2010–2011	Vitesse	2	(0)
2011–2012	Achilles '29	16	(2)
2012–2014	De Bataven		
2014–2016	DFS		
2016–2020	DUNO		
2020–2021	UDI '19		
2021–	SV de Paasberg		
- * Club domestic league appearances and goals as of January 17, 2012 (UTC)

Ted Heijckmann (born 24 November 1991) is a Dutch professional footballer, who currently plays for SV de Paasberg.

== Career ==
Born in Arnhem, but raised in Huissen, he is a former player of Vitesse. He left them for amateur side Achilles '29 in 2011, only to move on to De Bataven the next year. He joined UDI '19 in 2020 after a four-year spell at DUNO.
