= Yves Rogers =

Dutch basketball player (born 1989)

Yves Rogers (born 1989) is a Dutch former professional basketball player who competed in the Eredivisie for club Upstairs! Weert from 2009 to 2012.
