= Marvin Wijks =

Surinamese footballer (1984–2025)

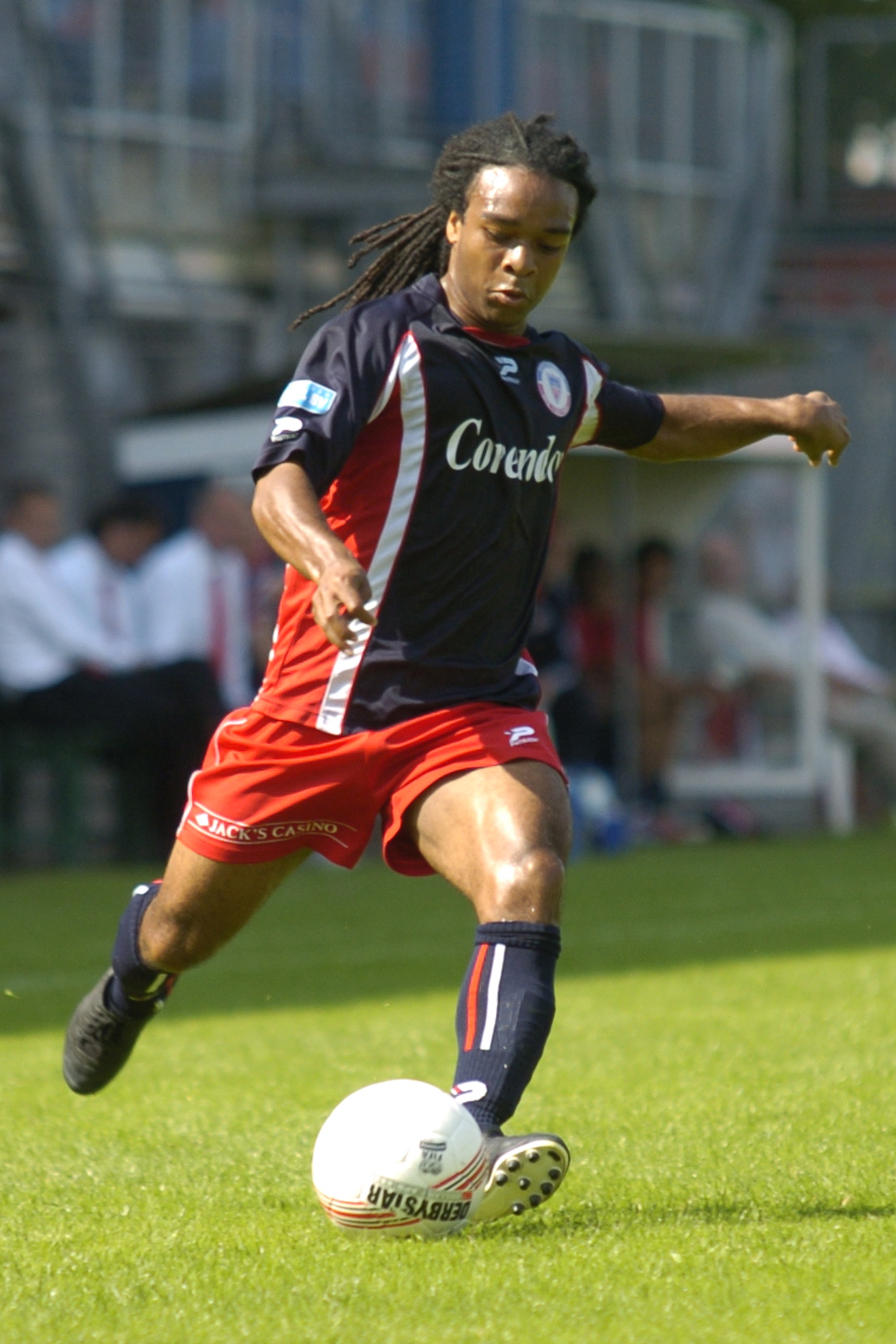
- Wijks in 2008

Personal information
- Date of birth: 11 May 1984
- Place of birth: Paramaribo, Suriname
- Date of death: 27 February 2025 (aged 40)
- Height: 1.65 m (5 ft 5 in)
- Position: Winger

Senior career*
Years	Team	Apps	(Gls)
2005–2006	Sparta Rotterdam	1	(0)
2006–2010	HFC Haarlem	105	(16)
2010–2011	1. FC Magdeburg	28	(1)
2011–2012	VfB Germania Halberstadt	29	(5)
2012–2013	FC Emmen	31	(4)
2013–2017	Rijnsburgse Boys	105	(18)
2017–2018	VVSB	7	(0)
- * Club domestic league appearances and goals

Marvin Wijks (11 May 1984 – 27 February 2025) was a Surinamese professional footballer who played as a winger.

== Career ==
Wijks, born in Paramaribo, Suriname, never played for an amateur team in his youth. He made his professional debut for Sparta Rotterdam in the Eredivisie on 4 December 2005 in a home match against ADO Den Haag, which Sparta lost 3–2. It was the only match he played for Sparta. He played for HFC Haarlem from 2006 to 2010. On 29 September 2006, he scored his first career goal for Haarlem in the away game against AGOVV Apeldoorn that Haarlem won 3–2 (Wijks scored the 3–1 in the 70th minute).

== Death ==
Wijks died on 27 February 2025, at the age of 40, after suffering a stroke three days earlier. He is survived by his wife and three children.
