= Caecilia Loots =

Dutch teacher and antifascist resistance member (1903–1988)

- Born: 27 December 1903; Haarlem, the Netherlands
- Died: 13 May 1988 (aged 84)
- Burial place: Leusden, Utrecht, the Netherlands
- Other name: Tante Ciel
- Occupations: Teacher and antifascist resistance member
- Awards: Righteous Among the Nations

Cilia Antonia Maria "Cilia" Loots (known as "Tante Kiel"; 27 December 1903 – 13 May 1988) was a Dutch teacher and antifascist resistance member, known for saving Jewish children during World War II. She is recognized as Righteous Among the Nations.

== Biography ==
Caecilia Loots was born in Haarlem. She ran a private school for children with severe learning disabilities in Amersfoort, Province of Utrecht. In 1942, she decided to hide many Jewish children in her school at her friend's request. She hid other children as well as time went on, and Dina van Heiningen (later van der Geld) helped her with the housework, while knowing the Jewish children were being hidden. Dina helped her aid the resistance through activities such as courier services and distributing illegal newspapers.

Loots' school was a risky place to hide the children as it was near the Amersfoort internment camp; an emergency hiding place was created in the attic but was rarely used. Loots also hid some adults in her home during the war, including escapees from the Amersfoort internment camp, as well as holding resistance meetings there.

In 1969 Loots was recognized as one of the Righteous Among the Nations by Yad Vashem. She died at the age of 84 and is interred in Leusden.
