= Emil Landman =

Dutch folk musician

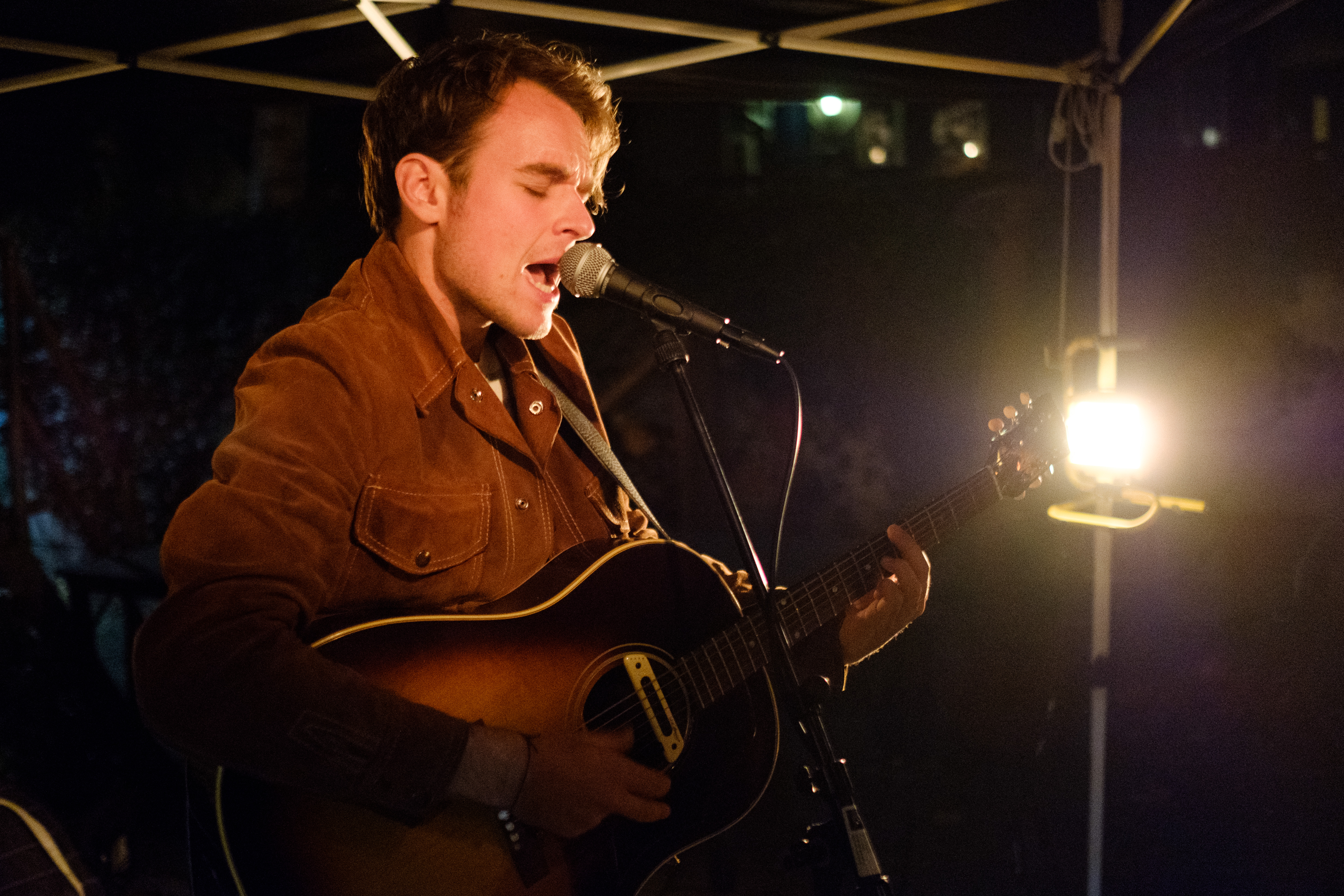

Background information
- Born: 1989 (age 36–37); Amsterdam, Netherlands
- Origin: Utrecht, Netherlands
- Genres: Folk
- Occupations: Singer, songwriter, musician
- Instrument: Guitar
- Years active: 2011–present
- Label: V2 Records
- Website: emillandman.com

Emil Landman (born in 1989 in Amsterdam) is a Dutch folk musician, based in Utrecht. He graduated from the Herman Brood Academy.

Landman released his debut EP A Bargain Between Beggars in February 2013. His debut album, Colours and Their Things, was produced by Martijn Groeneveld and released on 3 October 2014 through V2 Records. The album debuted at number 44 on the Dutch Albums Chart.

== Discography ==
=== Studio albums ===
Title	Album details	Peak chart positions
Title	Album details	NLD
Colours and Their Things	Released: 3 October 2014; Label: V2 Records Benelux	44
An Unexpected View	Released: 21 October 2016; Label: V2 Records Benelux	55

=== Extended plays ===
Title	Album details
A Bargain Between Beggars	Released: 1 February 2014

=== Singles ===
Title	Year	Album
"Goodnight, New Orleans"	2014	Colours and Their Things
"With You"	2015	Colours and Their Things

=== Music videos ===
Title	Year	Director
"Goodnight, New Orleans"	2014	Jess Myers
"With You"	2015	Emil Landman; Daan De Beer
