= Stijn Derkx =

Dutch footballer (born 1995)

Personal information
- Date of birth: 3 February 1995 (age 31)
- Place of birth: Heeze, Netherlands
- Height: 1.82 m (6 ft 0 in)
- Position: Forward

Team information
- Current team: Breugel-Herkol SV

Youth career
- RKSV Heeze
- 2008–2013: Willem II

Senior career*
Years	Team	Apps	(Gls)
2013–2015	Willem II	1	(0)
2015–2016	RKSV Heeze		
2016–2017	Esperanza Pelt		
2017–2018	RKSV Nuenen		
2018	RKSV Heeze		
2019	Breugel-Herkol SV		

International career
2010–2011	Netherlands U-16	5	(1)
2011–2012	Netherlands U-17	7	(1)
- * Club domestic league appearances and goals as of 26 January 2026

Stijn Derkx (born 3 February 1995) is a Dutch professional footballer who plays as a forward for Breugel-Herkol SV.

== Club career ==
Derkx joined the Willem II youth academy aged 13 and made his professional debut for them in the Eredivisie in the final game of the 2012–13 season against AZ. He had a trial with FC Oss in summer 2015, but left the club citing personal reasons.

In April 2016 he left hometown club RKSV Heeze for Belgian outfit Esperanza Pelt, but left the club after only one season due to financial reasons. RKSV Nuenen announced the arrival of Derkx for the 2017–18 season.

In July 2018, Derkx returned to RKSV Heeze. However, due to lack of playing thime, Derkx announced in November 2018, that he had left the club again. In January 2019, he signed for SV Herkol. Ahead of the 2019–20 season, he moved to Merksplas SK. As of March 2023, Derkx was still playing for Merksplas.

== International career ==
He played 5 matches for the Netherlands under-16 football team, making his debut in October 2010 against France U-16. He also played 7 for the U17s.
