= Pension de Vogel homeless hostel fire =

1992 fire in The Hague, Netherlands

- Date: 16 September 1992
- Venue: Pension de Vogel homeless hostel
- Location: The Hague, Netherlands; 52.072475°N 4.325888°E
- Type: Fire
- Deaths: 11
- Injuries: 15

The Pension de Vogel homeless hostel fire took place at the Scheepmakersstraat 22 in The Hague in the Netherlands on 16 September 1992. After an occupant set a fire 11 people died and 15 people were injured.

== Background ==
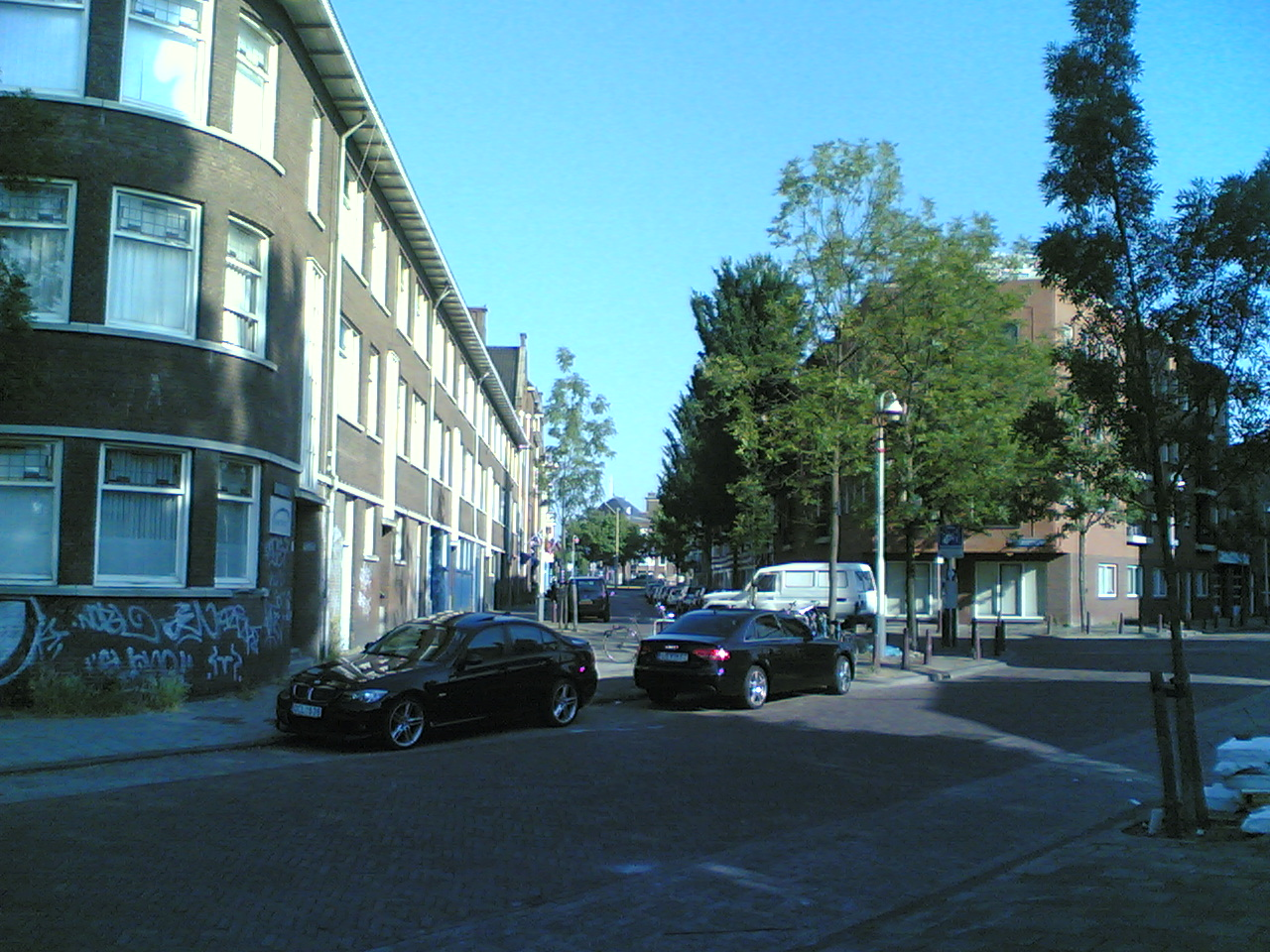
Scheepmakersstraat in The Hague in 2008. Pension de Vogel was located on the spot of the building on the right.

The Pension de Vogel was a hostel for homeless people and people with social problems, such as alcoholism, drug addiction, and psychiatric afflictions.

Ans de Vogel (affectionately named Ma Vogel) had run a hostel for such people for 30 years. Originally the hostel was located at the Poeldijksestraat, but it didn't conform to regulations, and after municipal intervention it moved to the Weteringkade and later to the Scheepmakersstraat.

In the Scheepmakersstraat building there were 38 small rooms, separated by wooden dividers. There was also a communal living and dining room. The hostel was known to the fire department of The Hague, which had refused it a permit in 1989 because of the lack of fire alarms, fire escapes and fire resistant dividers. Because the building's manager promised to renovate the building, the fire department condoned the situation on the first and second floor above ground level. But the attic was declared off-limits.

== The fire ==
On the night of 15 to 16 September 1992, more than 50 people were staying at the pension. Because of overcrowding, 10 people stayed in the attic, ignoring the fire department's strong recommendation that that floor not be used.

Fire broke out in the early morning of 16 September on the first floor. The fire, which was started by an occupant, swiftly crept throughout the building. People were jumping from the windows and from the roof by the time the fire department arrived. Then, while the rescue operations were underway, part of the attic collapsed and the stairwell was soon ablaze. An outside cage ladder was the only safe way out for those still trapped inside, but its existence was unknown to the occupants.

11 of the hostel's occupants died, either from burns or by falling to the ground. Of the 15 injured, 5 were severely wounded.

== Aftermath ==
After the fire one of the occupants confessed to having started the fire (she had made threats to do so previously, as well). She had bought some petrol at a filling station, and after the building's manager had left at 3:30 CET, she had set her room on fire. The municipality was severely criticised for condoning the situation, and soon issued strict measures and checks for pensions and rented houses, which were followed up nationally.
