= Rachèl Louise =

Dutch singer-songwriter (born 1989)

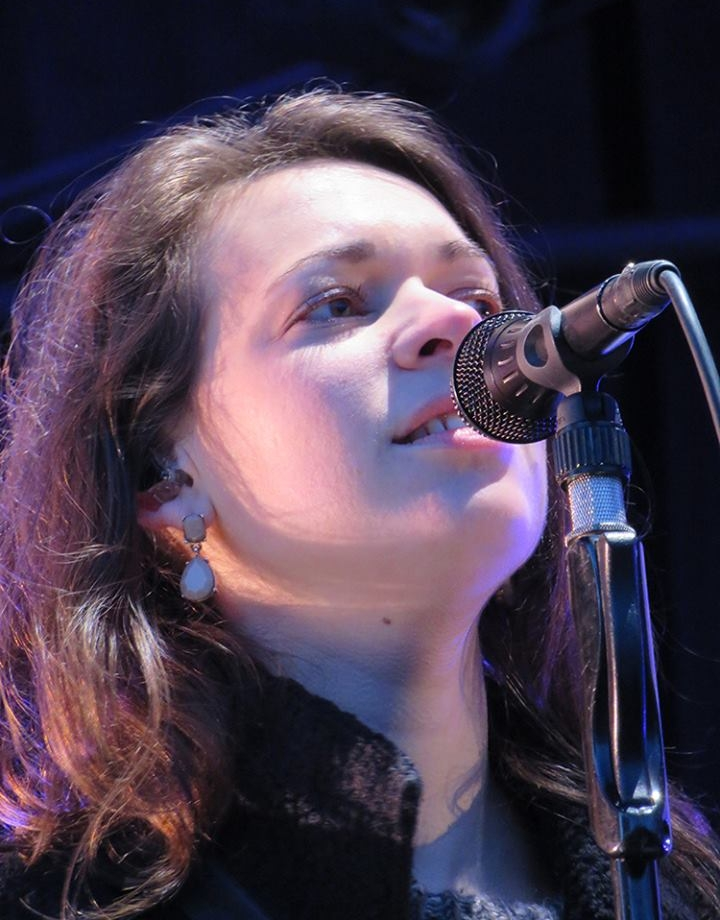

Background information
- Born: July 8, 1989 (age 37)
- Origin: Utrecht, Netherlands
- Genres: Rock music, pop
- Occupation: Singer-songwriter
- Instruments: Vocals, piano, guitar
- Years active: 2011–present
- Label: Rachèl Louise Music
- Website: www.rachellouisemusic.nl

Rachèl Louise (born July 8, 1989) is a Dutch singer-songwriter. After winning the Utrechtse Popprijs (Utrecht Pop Award) in 2011 and being called Serious Talent at the Dutch pop/rock radio station 3FM, she released her debut album Be Your Own Cheerleader on October 5, 2012.

== Biography and career ==
Louise was born in Utrecht as daughter of Rob and Lee Ann Vermeulen. She already was into music from her youth onwards. While at primary school she already sang in Kids Crew. She also was soloist in the Dutch TV show Prinsen en Prinsessen and she also sang at the black gospel choir Inside Out. She worked at many productions for CD, DVD and TV, both national and international.

In 2011 Louise wins the Utrechtse Popprijs (Utrecht Pop Award), multimedia platform 3VOOR12 calls her the most promising talent from Utrecht and by national radio station 3FM she is called Serious Talent. Since then, she acts in many different radio shows, among them at 538. She is also seen in De Wereld Draait Door. She also plays opening acts for artists like Dotan, James Morrison, Brooke Fraser and Jon Allen.

When Louise achieved her secondary school diploma, she moved to the United States to follow an education at the Musician Institute in Hollywood. After finishing, she returned to the Netherlands to start an education at the music school. She however quit after half a year to become a full-time musician. In 2012 Louise self-publishes her first album Be Your Own Cheerleader.

== Discography ==
=== Albums ===
Year	Album details
2011	Living in Holland: Released: 2011; Label: Rachèl Louise Music; Formats: EP
2012	Be Your Own Cheerleader: Released: October 5, 2012; Label: Rachèl Louise Music; Formats: CD

=== Singles ===
Year	Title	Album
2011	At The Disco	Living in Holland
2011	Hardcore	Be Your Own Cheerleader
2012	Take Your Place	Be Your Own Cheerleader
2012	Just A Few	Be Your Own Cheerleader
2013	Happiness	(new version)
