= Piersonstraat riots =

Squatter eviction in Nijmegen, the Netherlands

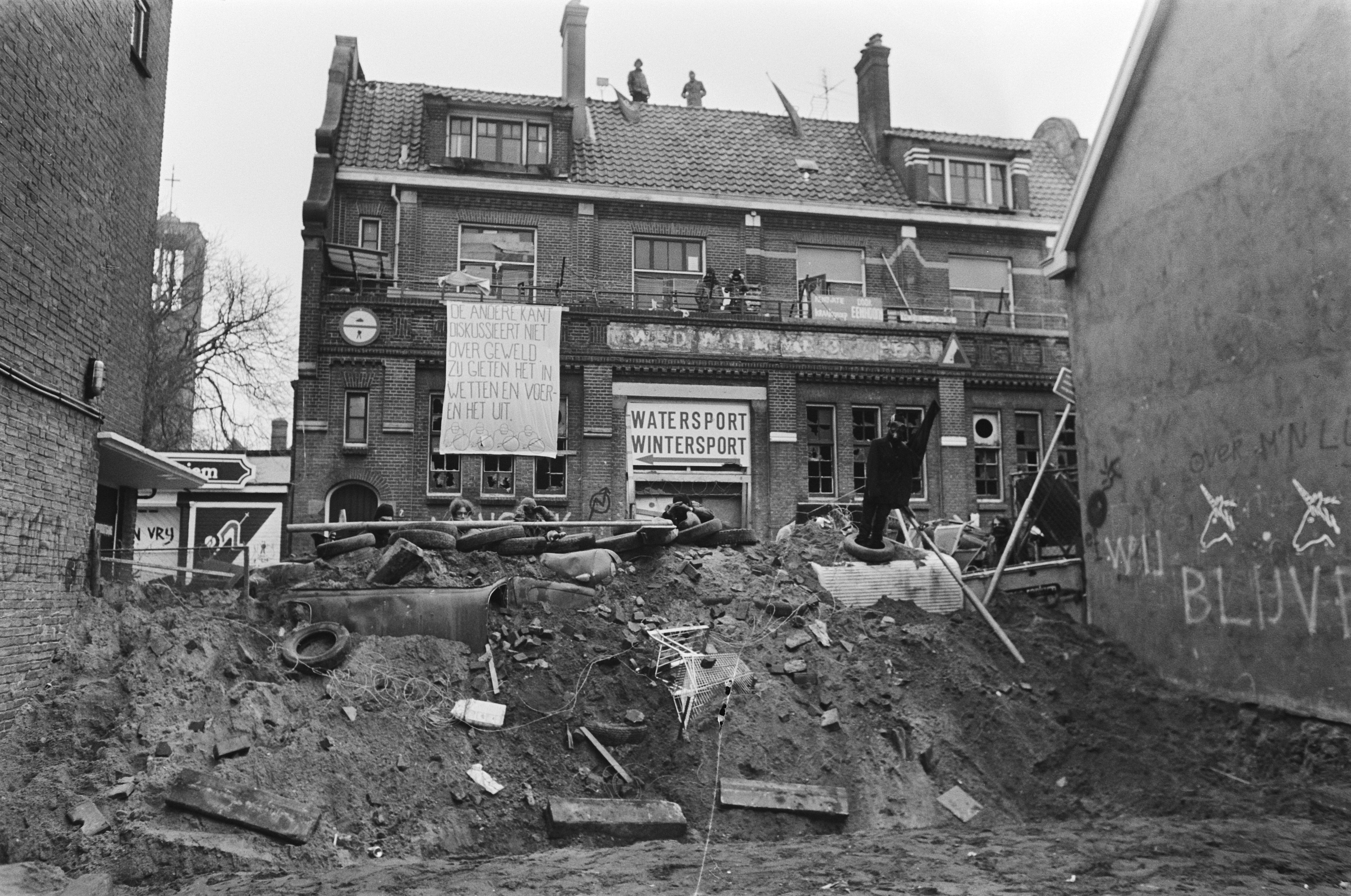
Barricades at the Piersonstraat

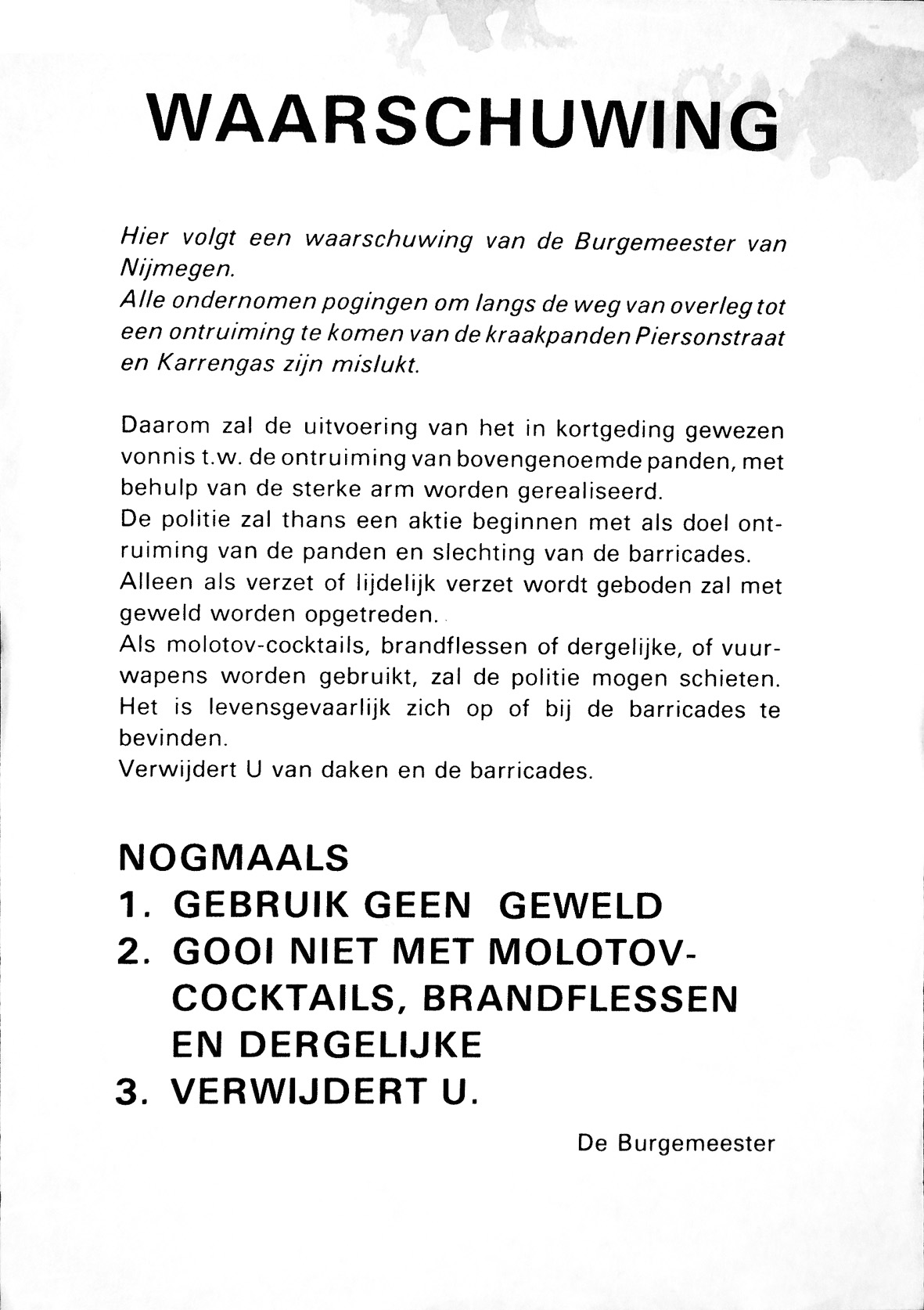
Eviction leaflet

The Piersonstraat riots (Dutch: Piersonrellen) occurred in 1981 in Nijmegen, the Netherlands. After the city council decided to demolish a warehouse and houses in the city centre to build a parking garage, local activists and the squatters movement combined to resist the eviction. This resulted in riots and the events have become part of Dutch history. The parking garage was not built.

== History ==
In 1981, after years of debate, the city council of Nijmegen decided to construct a parking garage at Piersonstraat in the centre of the city. This would entail the demolition of houses and the squatters movement intervened. On 15 February 1981, houses and a warehouse were occupied, in cooperation with the remaining local residents.

At first, there was opposition to the occupation and local youths came to attack the squats. Concerned citizens placed themselves between the barricades and the youths. Radio Rataplan, a local radio station which was broadcast nationally by VPRO, communicated the squatters' messages and gained them more support. Vrijstaat de Eenhoorn (Unicorn Free State) was declared and Rataplan passed on the appeal to help barricade the buildings. Local shops were visited and encouraged to support the occupation otherwise their windows would be broken.

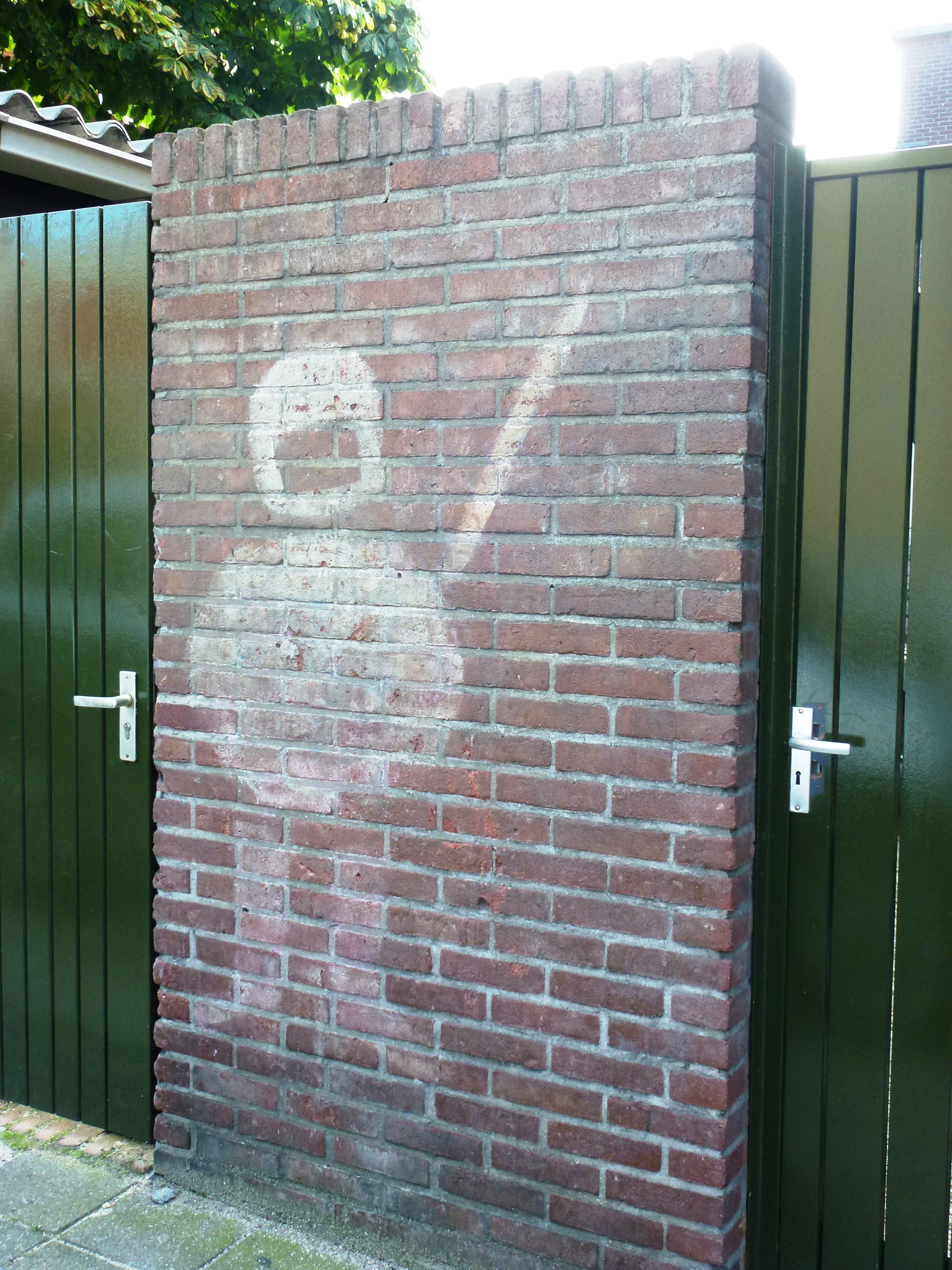
Commemorative graffiti on the Piersonstraat in 2013

The eviction occurred on 23 February when 2,000 police officers and soldiers were deployed. Firstly a helicopter flew overhead, dropping leaflets to communicate that the eviction about to start and stating that people should leave the area and if molotov cocktails were thrown, the police would return fire with live ammunition. When people started to leave, a smoke bomb was thrown and in the confusion the police attacked, using tear gas and armoured engineering vehicles to clear the buildings. A peaceful blockade of 200 people sitting down in the way of the police was batoned and serious disorder ensued. Ultimately, the warehouse was demolished, the houses were not, and the parking garage was not built. The city saw protest marches every Thursday evening until May.

== Legacy ==
Following the riots, official police reports were produced and the squatters movement released reflections. In 2006, an exhibition at De Stratemakerstoren museum called Pierson Mot Blieve! (Pierson must stay!) focused on the events and afterwards squatter archive materials were donated to the city archives. After thirty years, the state document archives were opened up and forty years after the riots, local shopkeepers recalled the severe economic hardship they faced in the months following the eviction.
