= Joey Eijpe =

Dutch baseball player (born 1988)

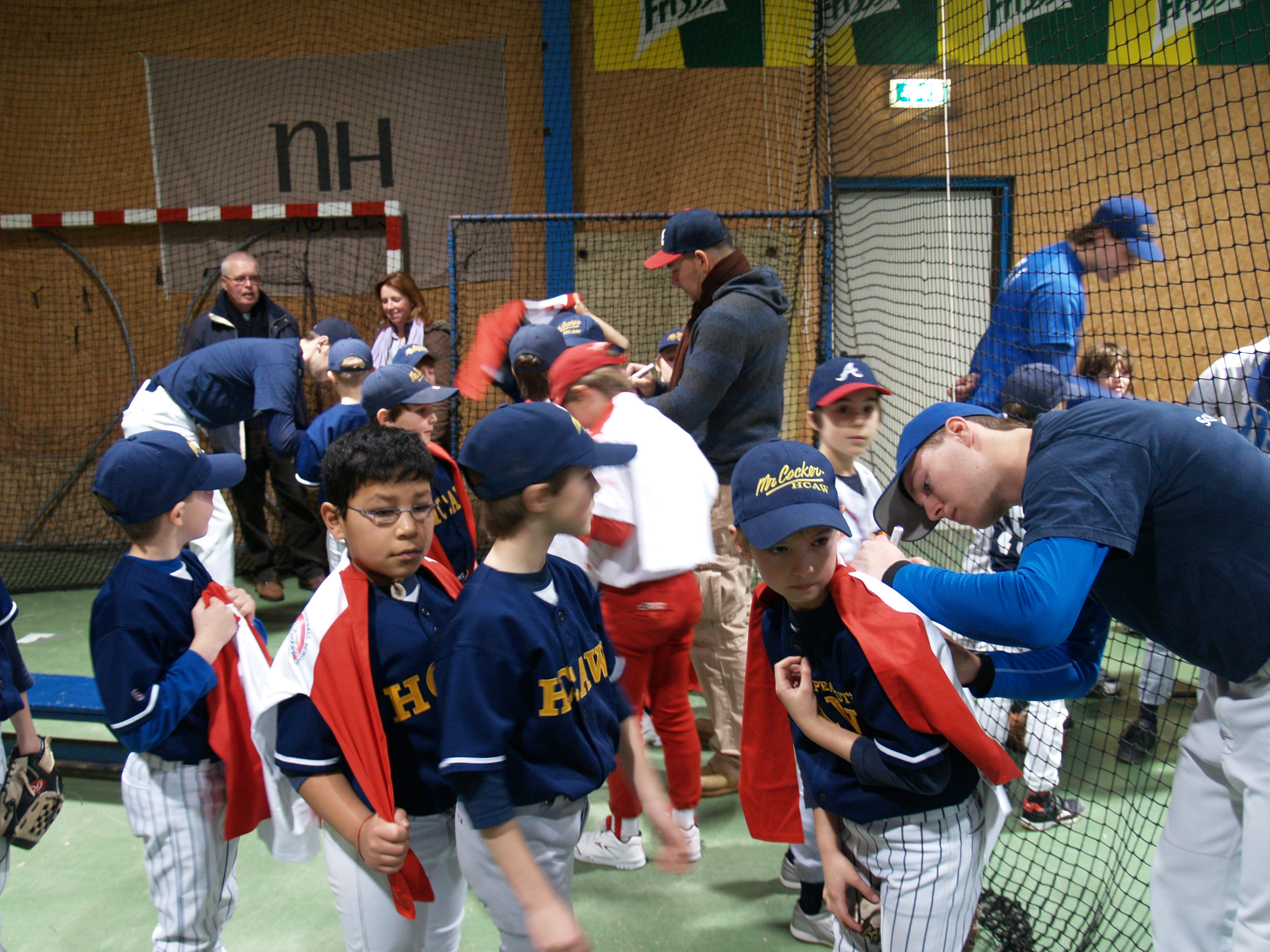
- Pitcher
- Born: January 17, 1988 (age 38); Huizen, Netherlands
- Bats: Left Throws: Left
- Stats at Baseball Reference

Joey Eijpe (born January 17, 1988, in Huizen) is a Dutch former professional baseball player. He played for HCAW in the Honkbal Hoofdklasse from 2006 to 2011.
