= Sylvana IJsselmuiden =

Dutch model, television presenter and actress

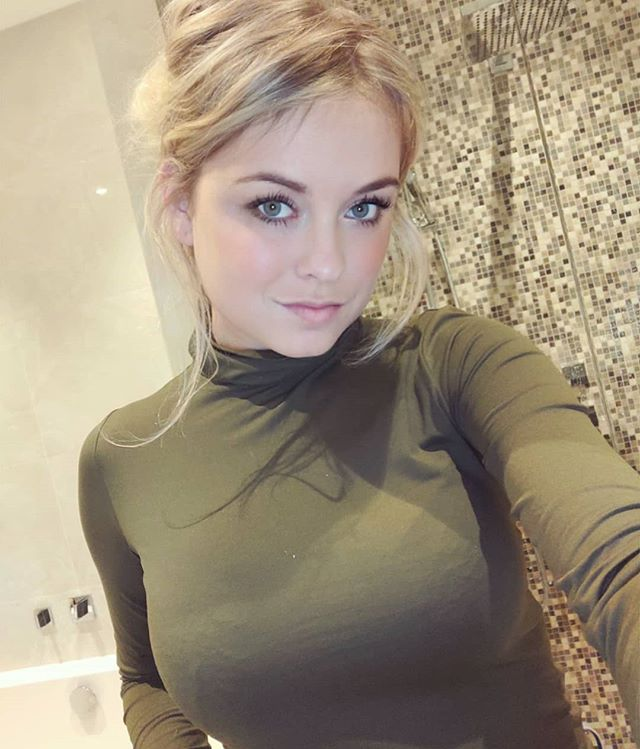
- Born: Sylvana Indira Nikita IJsselmuiden; 24 November 1994 (age 31); Leeuwarden, Netherlands
- Occupations: actress, model, TV presenter
- Website: www.sylvanaijsselmuiden.com

Sylvana Indira Nikita IJsselmuiden (Dutch: [sɪlˈvaːnaː ˈˈɛisəlˌmœydə(n)]; born November 24, 1994) is a Dutch model, television presenter and actress. After starting her career with SBS6 she hosts shows for both TV and online.

== Biography and career ==
IJsselmuiden was born in Leeuwarden and grew up in a family with two brothers and a sister. After finishing HAVO she studied Artiest Drama at D'Drive in Leeuwarden and started her career hosting SBS6's Babes in Business and Uit Voorraad Leverbaar.

After SBS6 she presented for Xite, Omrop Fryslân and RTL 4. She also became reporter for Dumpert and co-starred in the Dumpertreeten online series. She hosted the Autobahn F1 Show for the Autobahn online magazine. Apart from her jobs as a presenter IJsselmuiden also worked as a model.

In 2015 IJsselmuiden made her debut as an actress. She played Mieke in the 2015 Fout Bloed mini series. In 2016 she played the role of Fleur in the film Fissa and played a barmaid in the film Fataal. She also appeared in the films De Masters and Hartenstrijd.

In 2020 IJsselmuiden placed first in the FHM500 making her the most beautiful woman of the Netherlands of 2020.
