= Jan Mesdag =

Dutch singer and cabaret artist

Cover of 1988 CD Jan Mesdag zingt Brel ("Jan Mesdag sings Brel")

Jan Mesdag (Rotterdam, Netherlands, December 9, 1953 – December 4, 1988) was a Dutch singer and cabaret artist.

Mesdag, who was born Jan Henry de Vey Mestdagh, was a sensation in the Dutch cabaret scene of the 1980s due to his fine singing voice, acting, violin-playing and magic skills.

== Education ==
After completing gymnasium in Rotterdam, Mesdag moved in 1974 to Utrecht. There, he studied music for a year. He noticed he was favoring practice over theory. For that reason, he decided to study classical voice for the next two years at the Utrecht conservatory. In 1977 he was accepted at the Kleinkunstacademie (cabaret academy) in Amsterdam. Jan Mesdag's classmates included noted Dutch cabaretiers Kees Prins, Arjan Ederveen and Rik Hoogendoorn.

A workshop of a certain American artist was so inspiring that in 1979, Mesdag decided to move to New York City to continue his education. From May 1979 until January 1981, Mesdag took stage acting lessons with the teacher Stella Adler and completed workshops at the Circle Repertory Company and elsewhere. He performed with cabaretier Steve Ross in the Broadway Theatre Club in Ted Hook's On Stage. When American immigration discovered that Mesdag was in the U.S. on a student visa and was working, Mesdag returned to Amsterdam.

== Career ==
Mesdag then sang in De Nelson Revue (1982/1983), with Gerrie van der Klei, Jacques Klöters, Erik Breij, Haye van der Heyden, and others, and played the title role in De Zoon van Louis Davids (1983/1984). His colleagues in these works included Johan Ooms, Lex Goudsmit, Jenny Arean, Gerrie van der Klei, Joost Prinsen and then-budding artist Karin Bloemen, now one of the Netherlands' most prominent cabaretieres.

For his performances he received the Pall Mall Exportprijs ("Pall Mall Export Award") in 1983. Mesdag used the award money to return to New York. He had ambitions of an international career and expected to be welcomed with open arms on Broadway. That, however, did not happen as in 1985, Mesdag was just one of many actors hoping for a break. After 5 months he returned to the Netherlands, where he picked up his Dutch career again. He performed in various works such as Die Fledermaus and The Dutch Black and White Minstrel Show.

== Illness ==
Early in 1987, Mesdag was tested for AIDS and found out he was HIV-positive. This caused him to have to cancel his rehearsals for the musical Cats for which he was to play the role of Koos the theater cat. Later that year Mesdag experienced the first AIDS symptoms and he had to stop work definitively.

== Jacques Brel ==
Mesdag's last wish was to sing the works of Jacques Brel. Friends helped him to record an album in summer 1988. The best Dutch translator of Brel songs, Ernst van Altena, translated a number of new songs. Nico van der Linden handled the arrangements and musical accompaniment. Jacques Brel himself gave approval to the project. The album was released in November 1988 to positive reviews. Mesdag could enjoy his success for only one month, as on December 4 he died, a few days before his 35th birthday. Jan Mesdag zingt Brel ("Jan Mesdag sings Brel") is recognized as one of the best Dutch Brel translations.

== Documentary ==
In 2008 a documentary entitled "Jan Mesdag zingt Brel" was released about the recording of the album by the same name. It was directed by Emma Westermann and premiered at the Nederlands Film Festival in Utrecht. In honor of the premiere, Dyzlo Film and Westermann rereleased the CD "Jan Mesdag zingt Brel".

== Awards ==
- Pall Mall Exportprijs ("Pall Mall Export Award") 1983, awarded in January 1984

== Sources ==
- Website of the documentary about Jan Mesdag
- Jan Mesdag zingt Brel (documentary, Netherlands, 2008). Emma Westermann, director
