= 1982 in the Netherlands =

This article lists some of the events from 1982 related to the Netherlands.

== Incumbents ==
- Monarch: Beatrix
- Prime Minister: Dries van Agt until November 4, after November 4 Ruud Lubbers

== Events ==
- January 1: The military women departments MARVA, Luva and Milva are disbanded
- January 18: The protest group 'Stop the ammo train' blocks the rail at Roodeschool to stop the American ammunition transport from the Eemshaven to Germany. Demonstrators chain themselves to the train and the tracks. Police clear the section after which the train arrives at the main station in Groningen. Where an altercation erupts between the police's mobile unit and hundreds of protesters. Many delays were caused the following day by similar protest actions.
- March 17: An IKON TV-crew with Koos Koster, Jan Kuiper, Joop Willemse and Hans Terlaag are ambushed and killed in El Salvador. They were trying to interview FMLN rebels because of the upcoming election that will be held on March 28.
- March 27: The Netherlands men's national ice hockey team end 8th and last during the world championship ice hockey for B-Countries in Austria and relegate to the C-Division.
- April 8: The Floriade 1982 is held in Amsterdam.
- April 16: VVD leader Hans Wiegel accepts the position of Queens Commissioner in the province of Friesland. Ed Nijpels is elected as the next VVD Parliamentary leader in the House of Representatives.
- April 24/25: Table tennis player Bettine Vriesekoop wins the women's single and mixed doubles at the European championships in Budapest. Besides those two titles she also became 2nd in women's doubles in that tournament.
- May 13: The cabinet-Van Agt II falls, after Labour ministers keep disagreeing on the cuts for 1983. CDA and D66 enter an interim-cabinet Van Agt until the new elections that will be held on September 8, 1982.
- May 30: Billiards player Rini van Bracht wins the world title three-cushion in Guayaquil, Ecuador.
- June 2: Rudi Koopmans successfully defends his European light heavyweight boxing title in Italy against challenger Christiano Cavina.
- June 13: The Netherlands men's national field hockey team win the Hockey Champions Trophy for a second time in Amstelveen
- June 13: The Netherlands women's national rugby union team play their first official international match against France, who would win with 4–0.
- August 5: Annemarie Verstappen wins the 200 free stroke and ends 2nd on the 100 meter free stroke at the world championship swimming in Ecuador.
- September 8: Dutch general election, 1982
- September 24: While proceedings are still ongoing people start with chopping down 475 centuries old trees in Amelisweerd forest for the construction of the A27 road by assignment of minister Zeevalking.
- October 1: Prince Claus, who is suffering from severe depressions is admitted to a psychiatric clinic in Basel. He would reappear in public in September 1983. Surprisingly this all improved his popularity amongst the Dutch people.
- October 11: In Amsterdam severe riots break out after the Lucky Luyk is cleared.
- October 20: A disaster takes place at the Luzhniki Stadium during the soccer match Spartak Moscow vs HFC Haarlem. At least 66 people die in the crowd jam when a goal is scored in the final stages of the match.
- November 4: Ruud Lubbers becomes Prime Minister of the Netherlands.
- November 15: European light heavyweight boxing champion Rudi Koopmans successfully defends his title against compatriot Alex Blanchard, who loses on a TKO in the Ahoy arena in Rotterdam.
- November 26: Toos van der Valk, wife of Gerrit van der Valk CEO of hospitality chain Van der Valk, is abducted from her house in Nuland by 3 Italian criminals. She was released after 3 weeks after paying 12 to 13 million guilders in ransom .
- December 3: Jannes van der Wal becomes world champion checkers in São Paulo. Rob Clerc and Harm Wiersma become 2nd and 3rd. There were no Russians active due to visa issues.

== Births ==
- 8 June – Ruben Hein, musician
- 14 September – Jan Valize, politician
- 10 October – Jason Oost, footballer

== Sport ==
- 1981–82 Eredivisie
- 1981–82 Eerste Divisie
- 1981–82 KNVB Cup
- 1982 Amstel Gold Race
