= 1944 in the Netherlands =

- Decades: 1920s; 1930s; 1940s; 1950s; 1960s
- See also: Other events of 1944; History of the Netherlands

Events in the year 1944 in the Netherlands.

== Incumbents ==
- Monarch: Wilhelmina
- Prime Minister: Pieter Sjoerds Gerbrandy

== Events ==
The Dutch famine of 1944–45 began late in the year.

=== June ===
- 10 June: Anton Mussert reveals that he has become a volunteer for the Wehrmacht.

=== July ===
- 30 July: Start of the Deppner executions.

=== August ===
- 2 Aug: Gerbrandy and Van Heuven Goedhart sign the documents for the establishment of the College of Trusted Men (Dutch: College van Vertrouwensmannen)
- 24 Aug: First meeting of the College of Trusted Men
- 25 Aug: J.A. van Bijnen becomes the National Sabotage Commander of the Knokploegen (Knokploegen were Dutch resistance fighting squads)
- 28 Aug: First new airdrop of weapons and sabotage materials for Dutch underground groups
- 30 Aug: Hitler orders the improvement and extension of the Siegfried Line

=== September ===
- 2 Sep: The mass exodus of NSB members from South Limburg begins
- 3 Sep:
  - Brussels liberated
  - Prince Bernhard appointed Commander of the Dutch Armed Forces.
  - Queen Wilhelmina, via Radio Oranje, informs the population in occupied territory that 'liberation is imminent'
  - Commencement of the organized departure of German citizens from the Netherlands
- 3 to 4 Sep: Start of systematic railway sabotage by the Landelijke Knokploegen
- 4 Sep:
  - Antwerp liberated
  - Hitler orders the stubborn defense of West Zealand-Flanders and Walcheren
  - Seyss-Inquart declares the state of exception, Rauter orders everyone to be indoors by 8 pm
  - The queen agrees to Colonel Kruis being appointed Chief of Staff of Military Authority
  - Mussert decides to evacuate NSB members from the western and central regions to the east
  - The Government Information Service disseminates the incorrect information that Breda has been liberated
- 5 Sep:
  - The mass exodus of NSB members begins
  - The Dutch Labor Service empties
  - Dolle Dinsdag; the population behaves as if the occupier has already been expelled
  - First major transport of prisoners from the concentration camp Vught to Germany
- 6 Sep:
  - Prince Bernhard establishes himself on the continent
  - Second major transport of prisoners from Vught
- 7 Sep: Formation of an illegal Top Triangle in Amsterdam
- 8 Sep:
  - First two V-2 rockets launched at London
  - Commencement of the evacuation of the German Fifteenth Army across the Western Scheldt
- 10 Sep: The British Second Army crosses the Bocholt–Herentals Canal at Beeringen
- 11 Sep: Schöngarth, Commander of the Security Police and SD, issues the so-called Niedermachungsbefehl (orders to shoot resistance members on sight )
- 12 Sep: Major General Kruis issues a First General Directive with guidelines for the arrest of 'wrongful' elements
- 14 Sep:
  - Montgomery issues his directive for Operation Market Garden
  - Liberation of Maastricht
  - The first attempt by the Canadians to enter West Zeelandic Flanders is repelled
  - Establishment of the Militair Gezag (Military authority)
- 15 or 16 Sep: Hitler orders the utmost fanaticism in the defense of German territory
- 16 Sep: The illegal 'Delta Center' begins operating in Amsterdam
- 17 to 20 September – Battle of Nijmegen
- 17 to 26 September – Battle of Arnhem
- 17 Sep:
  - The British Second Army launches the offensive from Beeringen
  - Large Allied airborne landings in North Brabant, in the Reich of Nijmegen, and near Arnhem
  - The Dutch government orders a general railway strike
  - The Reichskommissariat is relocated to Delden
- 18 Sep: Liberation of Eindhoven
- 20 Sep:
  - Entire East Zeelandic Flanders liberated
  - Conquest of the Waal bridges near Nijmegen
  - The British Airborne forces have to abandon the Rhine bridge at Arnhem
- 21 Sep: Beginning of the German destruction of the port facilities of Rotterdam and Amsterdam
- 22 Sep: Major van Houten grants arrest authority to the Interior Armed Forces Shock Troops
- 24 Sep: The queen, bypassing the ministers, sends a telegram requesting the Great Advisory Commission of Illegality to be prepared to send a delegation to her
- 25 Sep:
  - The Airborne forces leave the 'perimeter' at Oosterbeek in the night to the 26th
  - Commencement of the evacuation of Arnhem

=== October ===
- 3 Oct: The RAF breaches the Westkappelse Zeedijk. In Eindhoven, the radio station 'Herrijzend Nederland' begins its broadcasts.
- 3 October to 8 November – Battle of the Scheldt
- 4 Oct: Important note from the queen: the second Gerbrandy cabinet must disappear.
- 6 Oct: The Canadian First Army launches a major offensive against the Germans in West Zeelandic Flanders.
- 10 Oct: The first company of the Shock Troops departs for the front.
- 16 Oct: Montgomery grants absolute priority to operations for clearing the Wester-Schelde. In Eindhoven, the 'Bond Nederland' is founded (soon renamed 'Gemeenschap Oud-Illegale Werkers Nederland').
- 18 Oct: Second General Directive from General Kruis.
- 24 Oct: Start of the Canadian attack on the Kreekrak Dam.
- 25 Oct: Commencement of the liberation of Den Bosch.
- 27 Oct: Liberation of Tilburg.
- 29 Oct: Liberation of Breda.

=== November ===
- 1 Nov: Allied landings at Vlissingen and at Westkapelle.
- 2 Nov: German resistance in and around West Zeeland-Flanders is broken.
- 6 Nov: Liberation of Middelburg.
- 8 Nov: An American division, part of the Canadian First Army, reaches Moerdijk.
- 12 Nov: Assertive letter from General Kruis to prevent the arrival of ministerial 'quartermasters.'
- 15 Nov: Kruis officially establishes a Temporary Committee of General Commissioners for agriculture, trade, and industry.
- 21 Nov: 'Hunger demonstration' in Eindhoven.
- 25 Nov: The ministerial 'quartermasters' establish themselves in Oisterwijk. Disturbances in the center of Brussels.
- 27 to 30 November – Battle of Broekhuizen
- 28 Nov: The first Allied convoy reaches the port of Antwerp.

=== December ===
- 2 Dec: The Wehrmacht floods a large part of the Betuwe.
- 3 Dec: In Middle Limburg, the Wehrmacht is pushed east of the Meuse.
- 6 Dec: Meeting of Kruis in Eindhoven with top figures of the resistance in the liberated South to establish guidelines for the arrest of 'wrongful' elements.
- 14 Dec: Kruis issues new arrest guidelines.
- 21 Dec: The bishops of Den Bosch and Breda call on Catholics to remain loyal to their own organizations.
- c. 31 Dec: Incorrectly believing itself to have great influence in the liberated southern Netherlands, the Communist Party of the Netherlands rebrands as the "Communistische Partij Bevrijd Gebied" (Communist Party Liberated Area).

== Births ==
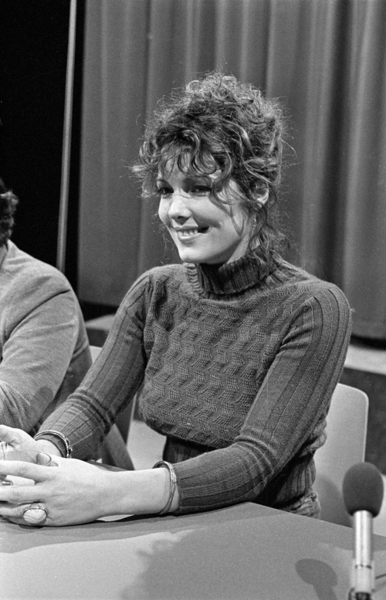
Willeke van Ammelrooy

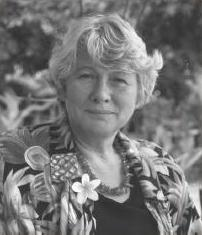
Heleen Sancisi-Weerdenburg

- 2 January – Willy Dobbe, television presenter and announcer
- 23 January – Rutger Hauer, actor, writer and environmentalist (d. 2019)
- 20 February – Willem van Hanegem, football player and coach
- 16 March – Pieter de Zwart, sailor.
- 1 April – Theo Hiddema, lawyer, media personality and politician
- 5 April – Willeke van Ammelrooy, actress and director
- 26 April – Huib Ruijgrok, footballer
- 20 May – Boudewijn de Groot, singer-songwriter
- 24 May – Heleen Sancisi-Weerdenburg, ancient historian (d. 2000)
- 10 June – Eegje Schoo, politician and diplomat
- 15 July – Klaas de Vries, composer
- 27 July – Philip Freriks, journalist, columnist and television presenter
- 3 August – Willem H. Vanderburg, engineer
- 11 August – Bean van Limbeek, sport shooter (d. 2014).
- 30 August – Freek de Jonge, cabaret performer and writer
- 13 September – Gerrit Jan van Ingen Schenau, biomechanist (d. 1998)
- 23 September – Jan Dijkema, politician, sociologist and sports director
- 15 October – Vilma Henkelman, sculptor, ceramist, and photographer
- 29 October – Robbie van Leeuwen, musician
- 5 December – Jeroen Krabbé, actor and film director
- 16 December – Roeland Nolte, chemist (d. 2024)

=== Full date missing ===
- Max Bolleman, jazz drummer, audio engineer and record producer
- Kommer Damen, businessman
- Tim Griek, musician and producer (d. 1988)
- Sytse Strijbos, academic
- Tjebbe van Tijen, sculptor, performance artist, curator, net artist, archivist, and media theorist

== Deaths ==
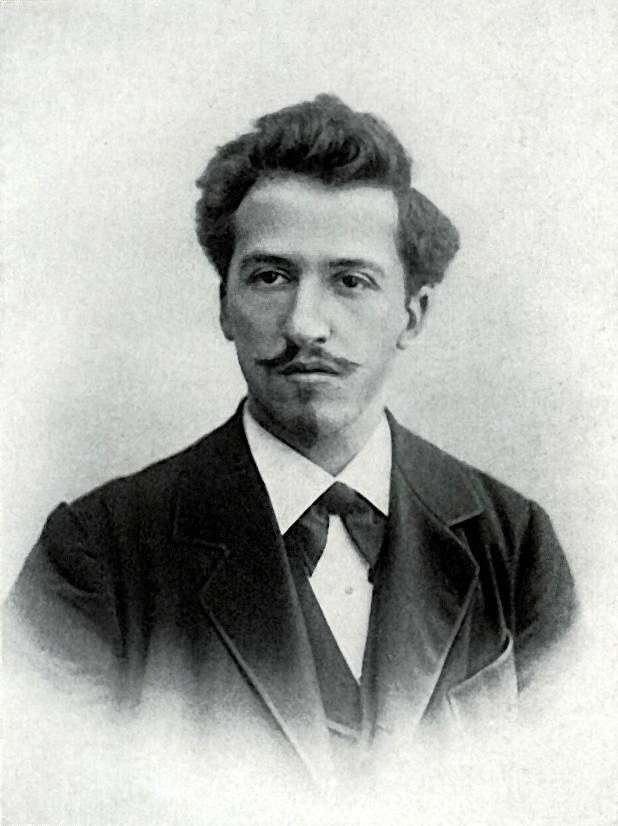
Piet Mondrian

- 1 February – Piet Mondrian, painter and theoretician (b. 1872)
- 2 February – Tjapko van Bergen, rower and SS Rottenführer (b. 1903).
- 8 February – Joop Kolkman, journalist and diplomat (b. 1896)
- 20 February – Albert Heijnneman, sprinter (b. 1896).
- 29 February – Abraham Mok, gymnast (b. 1888).
- 6 March – Eva and Abraham Beem, Jewish siblings and victims of the Holocaust (b. 1932 and 1934)
- 6 March – Simon Okker, fencer (b. 1881).
- 9 March – Casper ten Boom, helped many Jews and resisters escape the Nazis during the Holocaust of World War II (b. 1859)
- 6 April – W. F. Gisolf, geologist (b. 1884)
- 13 April – Friedrich Gutmann, banker and art collector (b. 1886)
- 30 May – Marinus Adrianus Koekkoek the Younger, painter (b. 1873)
- 10 June – Willem Jacob van Stockum, mathematician (b. 1910)
- 10 June – Gerrit van der Veen, sculptor (b. 1902)
- 18 July – Wim Anderiesen, footballer (b. 1903)
- 31 July – Settela Steinbach, holocaust victim (b. 1934)
- 4 August – Hans Mossel, clarinetist and saxophonist (b. 1905)
- 7 August – Johannes Scheuter, sport shooter (b. 1880).
- 11 August – Joop Westerweel, schoolteacher and World War II resistance leader (b. 1899)
- 2 September – Hendrikus Albertus Lorentz, explorer and diplomat (b. 1871)
- 3 September – Ernst de Jonge, lawyer, Olympic rower and member of the Dutch resistance (b. 1914).
- 6 September – Lion van Minden, fencer (b. 1880).
- 8 September – Jan van Gilse, composer and conductor (b. 1881)
- 9 September – Dirk Boonstra, police commander (b. 1893)
- 15 September – Walter Middelberg, rower (b. 1875).
- 19 September – Jan van Hoof, resistance member (b. 1922)
- 4 October – Maurits van Löben Sels, fencer (b. 1876).
- 7 October – Jacobus Kann, banker (b. 1872)
- 18 October – Juda Lion Palache, linguist (b. 1886)
- 21 October – Adri Bleuland van Oordt, artist and draftswoman (b. 1862)
- 5 November – Willy Dols, linguist (b. 1911)
- 6 December – Boy Ecury, resistance member (b. 1922)
- 16 December – Betsie ten Boom, resistance member (b. 1885)
- 18 December – M. H. J. Schoenmaekers, mathematician (b. 1875)
- 28 December – Tjeerd Pasma, modern pentathlete (b. 1904).

== See also ==
- Chronology of the liberation of Dutch cities and towns during World War II
