= 1945 in the Netherlands =

- Decades: 1920s; 1930s; 1940s; 1950s; 1960s
- See also: Other events of 1945; History of the Netherlands

Events in the year 1945 in the Netherlands.

== Incumbents ==
- Monarch: Wilhelmina
- Prime Minister: Pieter Sjoerds Gerbrandy (until 25 June); Willem Schermerhorn (from 25 June)

== Events ==
=== January ===
- 2 Jan: Special meeting of the Council of Ministers to discuss the position of the Militair Gezag
- 11 Jan: The cabinet accepts that the queen does not sign the arrangement for the emergency parliament.
- 14 Jan: Commencement of the evacuation of Venlo.
- 20 Jan: Commencement of the evacuation of Roermond.
- 22 Jan: The ministers approve a letter from Gerbrandy warning the queen against the formation of a royal cabinet.
- 23 Jan: Gerbrandy dismisses Burger from the cabinet due to a radio speech and tenders the resignation of the cabinet.
- 31 Jan: A delegation invited by the queen from the liberated South arrives in London.

=== February ===
- 5 Feb: Minister van Kleffens refuses to form a cabinet.
- 8 Feb: The queen instructs Gerbrandy to form a new cabinet.
- 10 Feb: The arrestation regulations for the area to be liberated are established.
- 15 Feb: Minister van Heuven Goedhart inaugurates the first Tribunal.
- 23 Feb: Announcement of the composition, to the extent completed, of the third Gerbrandy cabinet.
- 24 Feb: Pieter Sjoerds Gerbrandy urges Eisenhower's Chief of Staff Bedell Smith for a separate offensive for the liberation of the Netherlands north of the major rivers.

=== March ===
- 1 Mar: Liberation of Roermond and Venlo.
- 3 Mar: Bombing of the Bezuidenhout quarter in The Hague.
- 7 Mar: Rauter is seriously wounded in an ambush at Woeste Hoeve; two hundred and sixty-three death-row candidates are executed.
- 14 Mar: The Combined Chiefs of Staff instruct Eisenhower to launch a separate offensive for the liberation of West Netherlands.
- 18 Mar: J.J.F. Borghouts ('Peter-Zuid') arrives in occupied territory as the Commander of the Fighting Section of the BS (Binnenlandse Strijdkrachten/Interior Forces).
- 30 Mar: Commencement of the liberation of East and North Netherlands.

=== April ===
- 2 Apr: In a conversation with Hirschfeld, Seyss-Inquart suggests the idea of a ceasefire that would allow large-scale assistance to the famine-stricken provinces.
- 4 Apr: Mussert flees over the Afsluitdijk to The Hague.
- 6 Apr: Start of the Georgian uprising on Texel.
- 7 to 8 April – Operation Amherst
- 9 Apr: Consultation between the Trusted Men and members of Koot's staff regarding Seyss-Inquart's offer.
- 11 Apr:
  - Buchenwald is liberated as the first concentration camp not completely evacuated by Allied forces.
  - Canadians cross the IJssel near Brummen.
- 12 Apr:
  - Montgomery cancels the separate offensive for the liberation of the famine-stricken provinces.
  - Seyss-Inquart meets with Van der Vlugt and Six as representatives of the College of Trusted Men and Colonel Koot.
- 12 to 16 April – Liberation of Arnhem
- 14 Apr:
  - Himmler issues the order: 'No prisoner may fall into enemy hands alive.'
  - Arrival of Trusted Men, Van der Gaag and Neher, in the liberated South.
- 15 Apr: Gerbrandy meets with Churchill to discuss Seyss-Inquart's offer.
- 17 Apr: Inundation of the Wieringermeer.
- 18 Apr: The entire East and North of the country is liberated except for the area near Delfzijl and the Wadden Islands.
- 21 Apr: The resistance sends its first telegram to London, protesting against the negotiations with Seyss-Inquart.
- 23 Apr: The Combined Chiefs of Staff authorize Eisenhower to conclude a ceasefire with Seyss-Inquart.
- 28 Apr: In Achterveld, the German Schwebel and Montgomery's Chief of Staff de Guingand reach an agreement for a conference with Seyss-Inquart.
- 29 Apr:
  - Hitler appoints Admiral Dönitz as his successor.
  - First food drops in the famine-stricken provinces.
- 30 Apr:
  - Suicide of Adolf Hitler
  - In Achterveld, Seyss-Inquart approves arrangements for rapid assistance to the famine-stricken provinces.

=== May ===
- 2 May: First food transports to the famine-stricken provinces by road, via Rhenen.
- 2–3 May: Seyss-Inquart departs for Flensburg for discussions with Dönitz.
- 4 May:
  - Montgomery accepts the capitulation of the 'Wehrmacht' in Northwest Europe, including the Netherlands.
  - 'Mobilization' of the BS (Binnenlandse Strijdkrachten/Interior Forces) in the famine-stricken provinces.
- 5 May:
  - General Johannes Blaskowitz receives the capitulation order presented by General Foulkes at Hotel 'De Wereld' in Wageningen.
  - Radio speech by Queen Wilhelmina.
  - The first food ships arrive in Rotterdam.
  - An Allied vanguard arrives in Copenhagen.
- 6 May: General Blaskowitz signs the capitulation order presented to him the previous day in the auditorium of the Agricultural College in Wageningen.
- 7 May:
  - First 'general' German capitulation at Reims.
  - Shooting incident on Dam Square in Amsterdam.
  - Arrest of Mussert.
- 8 May:
  - Entry of the two divisions of the 1st Canadian Army Corps in Amsterdam, The Hague, and Rotterdam.
  - General Kruis, Chief of Staff Military Authority, arrives in The Hague.
  - An Allied vanguard arrives in Oslo. Second 'general' German capitulation in Berlin.
- 13 May: German deserter execution
- 16 May: Dissolution of the College of Trusted Men.
- 20 May: A Canadian force arrives on Texel and the local German forces surrender, ending the Georgian uprising on Texel. The Georgians are allowed to retain their arms.

=== June ===
- 3 Jun: German forces on the island of Ameland surrender.
- 11 Jun: The last 600 active German troops in the Netherlands, on the island of Schiermonnikoog, surrender to the Canadians and are evacuated from the island, completing the liberation of the Netherlands.
- 16 Jun: The Georgian Legion is evacuated from Texel.

== Births ==
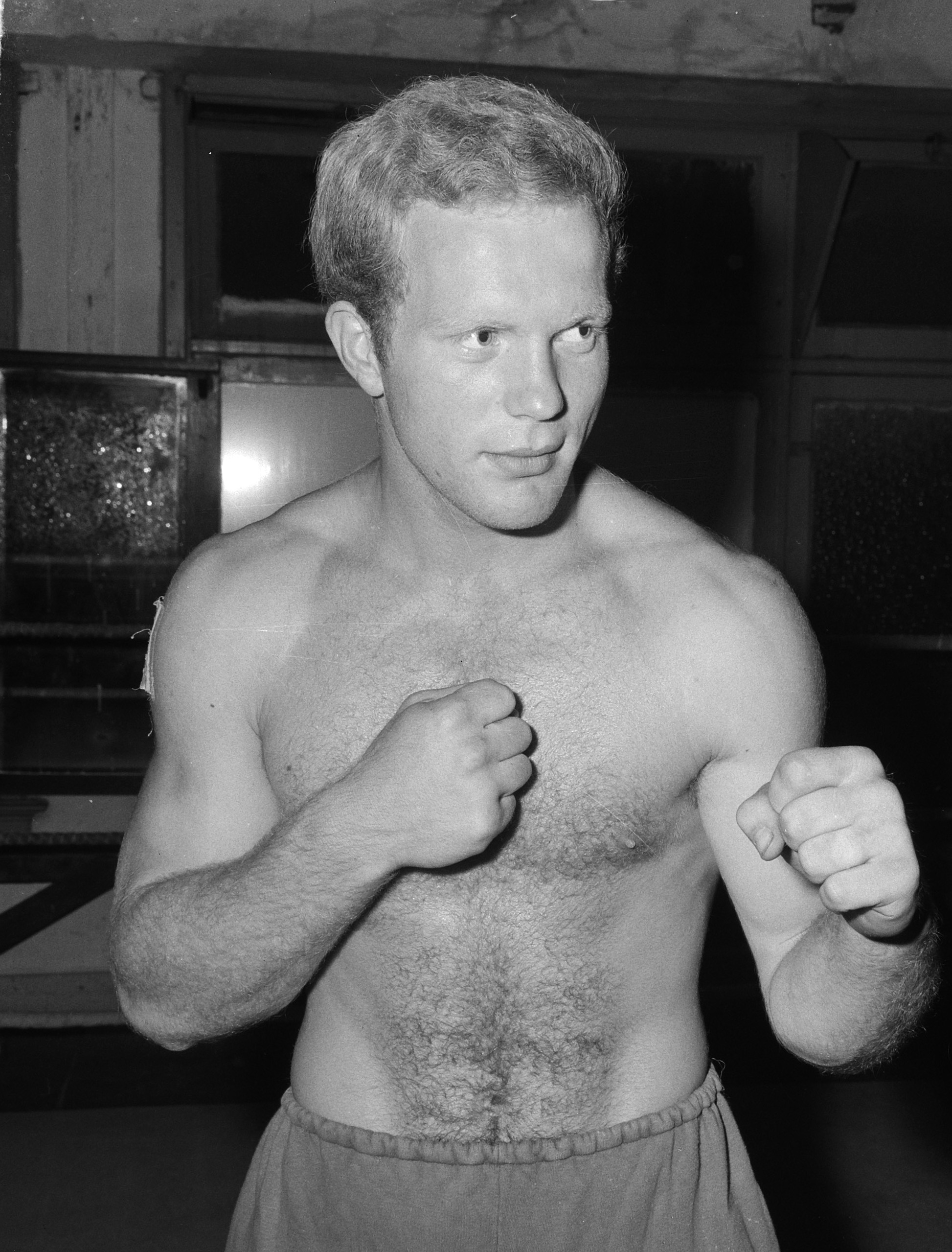
Rudi Lubbers

- 4 January – Jean Bessems, carom and artistic billiards player
- 6 January – Anja Meulenbelt, politician and writer
- 10 January – Henri Bol, still life painter (d. 2000)
- 25 January – Lennaert Nijgh, lyricist (d. 2002)
- 3 February – Willeke Alberti, singer and actress
- 16 February
  - Toon van Driel, cartoonist, comics writer and comics artist
  - L. H. Wiener, writer
- 17 February – Chris Dolman, martial artist and professional wrestler
- 21 February – John Bröcheler, operatic baritone (d. 2026)
- 3 March – Gee van Enst, rower.
- 14 March
  - René de Boer, sculptor
  - Herman van Veen, stage performer, actor, author, singer/songwriter and musician
- 28 March – Bert Groen, corporate director, civil servant and politician
- 29 March – Willem Ruis, game show presenter (d. 1986)
- 4 May – Jan Mulder, footballer, writer, columnist, and TV personality
- 8 May – Arthur Docters van Leeuwen, politician, jurist and civil servant
- 20 May – Saskia Holleman, actress, lawyer and model (d. 2013).
- 25 May – Nicolaas Matsier, novelist
- 12 June – Gaby Minneboo, cyclist
- 15 June – Corrie Bakker, track and field athlete.
- 16 June – Roy Ho Ten Soeng, politician
- 20 June – Jan Dietz, information systems researcher
- 9 July – Erik van der Wurff, pianist, composer, arranger, producer and conductor (d. 2014)
- 17 August – Rudi Lubbers, boxer.
- 27 August – Jan Sloot, electronics engineer (d. 1999)
- 28 September – Vincent Mentzel, photographer
- 24 October – Ernst Jansen Steur, neurologist
- 30 October – Fred Rompelberg, cyclist
- 2 November – Cees Stam, track cyclist
- 19 November – Hans Monderman, road traffic engineer and innovator (d. 2008)
- 27 November – Phil Bloom, artist, entertainer and actress

=== Full date missing ===
- Christian Dumolin, businessman
- Henk van der Flier, psychologist
- Jan Plas, kickboxer (d. 2010)
- Madelon Vriesendorp, artist

== Deaths ==
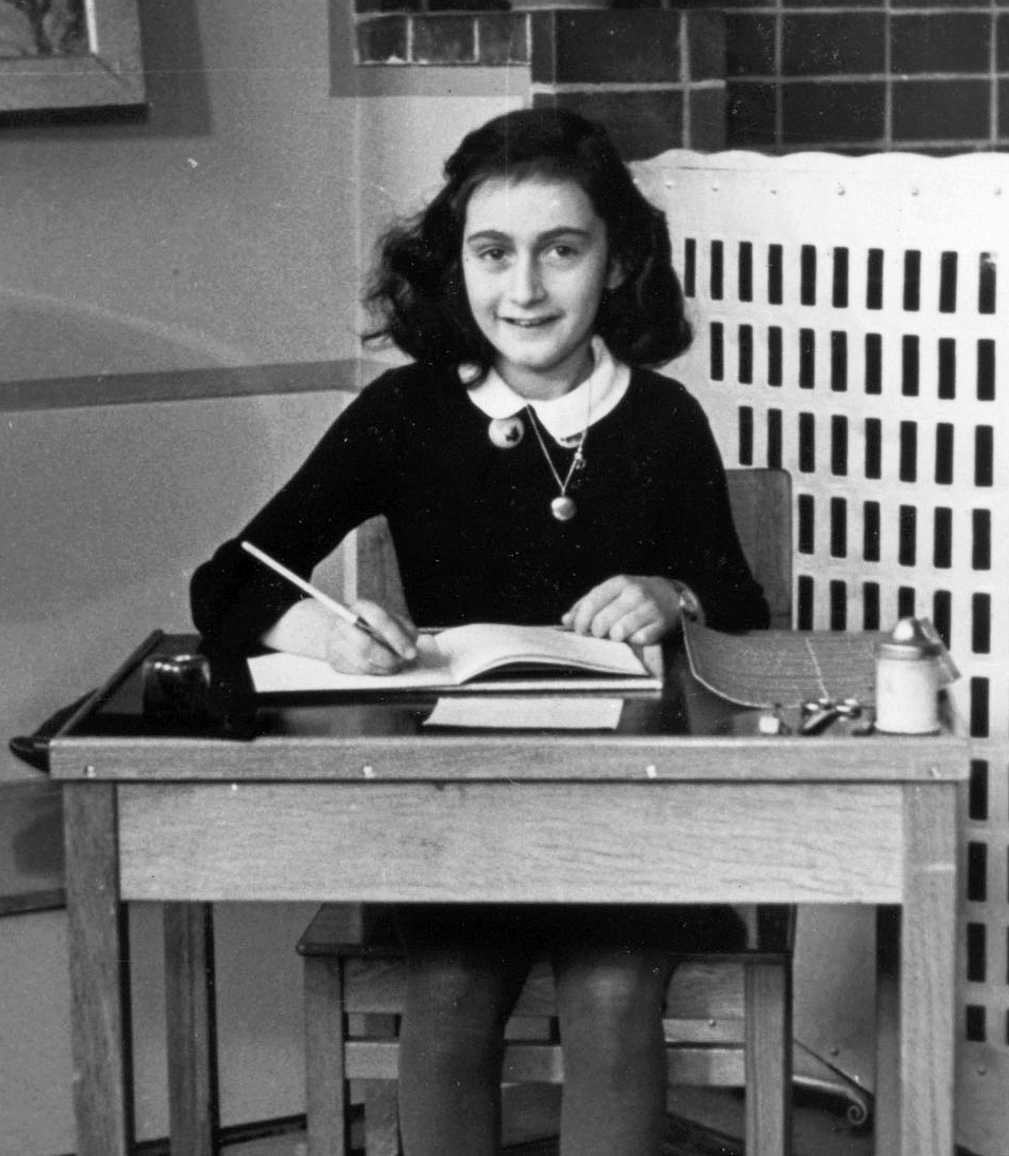
Anne Frank

- 2 January – Arie Bijl, physicist (b. 1908)
- 30 January – Jur Haak, footballer (b. 1890)
- 1 February – Johan Huizinga, historian (b. 1972)
- 9 February – Piet Klijnveld, accountant (b. 1874)
- 12 February – Walraven van Hall, banker and resistance leader (b. 1906)
- 17 February – Gabrielle Weidner, resistance fighter (b. 1914)
- 1 April – Piet Tekelenburg, footballer (b. 1894)
- 15 April – Joannes Cassianus Pompe, pathologist (b. 1901)
- 17 April – Hannie Schaft, communist resistance fighter during World War II (b. 1920)
- 28 May – Lothar van Gogh, footballer (b. 1888)
- 16 August – Nico Richter, composer (b. 1915)
- 25 August – Henriëtte van der Meij, feminist (b. 1850)
- 7 September – Harry Kuneman, governor (b. 1886)
- 22 October – Jac. van Ginneken, linguist, priest and Jesuit (b. 1877)
- 13 November – Albert Heijn, entrepreneur (b. 1865)

=== Full date missing ===
- Anne Frank, diarist (b. 1929)
- Margot Frank (b. 1926)

== See also ==
- Chronology of the liberation of Dutch cities and towns during World War II
