= AGS =

AGS may refer to:

== Organizations ==
=== Businesses ===
- AGS Airports, owner of Aberdeen, Glasgow and Southampton airports
- AGS (motorcycle manufacturer), a motocross bicycle manufacturer
- AGS Entertainment, a film production company in India
- Alabama Great Southern Railroad, US
- Automobiles Gonfaronnaises Sportives, a defunct Formula 1 team

=== Educational institutions ===
==== United Kingdom ====
- Aberdeen Grammar School, Scotland
- Acklam Grange School, Middlesbrough, England
- Adams' Grammar School, Newport, Shropshire, England
- Alcester Grammar School, Warwickshire, England
- Antrim Grammar School, County Antrim, Northern Ireland
- Aylesbury Grammar School, Buckinghamshire, England

==== Elsewhere ====
- Alaqsite'w Gitpu School, Listuguj, Quebec, Canada
- Alliance Graduate School, Quezon City, Philippines
- American Graduate School in Paris, France
- American Graduate School of International Relations and Diplomacy, Paris, France
- Arkansas Governor's School, Conway, Arkansas, U.S.
- Auckland Grammar School, New Zealand

=== Government and politics ===
- Alberta Geological Survey, Canada
- An Garda Síochána, the Irish police force
- Australian Government Solicitor

=== Societies ===
- Alpha Gamma Sigma (honor society)
- American Gem Society
- American Geographical Society
- American Geriatrics Society
- Atlantic Geoscience Society

=== Other organizations ===
- Alpha Gamma Sigma (fraternity)

== Places ==
- Argyle Street railway station, Glasgow, Scotland
- Augusta Regional Airport in Augusta, Georgia, US

== Science and technology ==
=== Medicine ===
- Acute grass sickness, a horse disease
- Adrenogenital syndrome, resulting in hormone imbalance etc.
- Aicardi–Goutières syndrome, a rare genetic disorder with a variety of symptoms (neurological, development delays, skin rashes etc.)
- Alpha-gal syndrome, a meat allergy resulting from a tick bite

=== Military technology ===
- AGS-17, the Soviet-designed automatic grenade launcher
- AGS-30, successor of AGS-17
- Advanced Gun System
- Airborne Ground Surveillance, a class of military airborne radar systems
- Alliance Ground Surveillance
- Armored Gun System, or the M8 Armored Gun System light tank
- Surveying ship (AGS), a US Navy hull classification symbol

=== Other uses in science and technology ===
- Accessory gonadal structures, secondary organs or tissues supporting a reproductive system
- Adventure Game Studio, a development tool for graphic adventure games
- AGS, product prefix used by models of the Game Boy Advance SP
- Alternating Gradient Synchrotron, a particle accelerator
- Annualized Geothermal Solar, a passive building heating technology
- Apollo Abort Guidance System, a backup computer providing abort capability on the Apollo Lunar Module
- Silver sulfide (Ag_{2}S)

== Other uses ==
- American Government Simulation, a government simulation game
- The Esimbi language (ISO 639-3 code asi)
- Any Given Sin

== See also ==
- Aggies (disambiguation)
