= 1788 in the Dutch Republic =

- Years in the Netherlands: 1785 1786 1787 1788 1789 1790 1791
- Centuries: 17th century · 18th century · 19th century
- Decades: 1750s 1760s 1770s 1780s 1790s 1800s 1810s
- Years: 1785 1786 1787 1788 1789 1790 1791

The following lists events that happened during 1788 in the Dutch Republic.

== Events ==
=== July ===
- July 13 - A hailstorm sweeps across France and the Dutch Republic with hailstones 'as big as quart bottles' that take 'three days to melt'; immense damage is done.
