= 1951 in the Netherlands =

- Decades: 1930s; 1940s; 1950s; 1960s; 1970s
- See also: Other events of 1951; History of the Netherlands

The following events occurred in the Netherlands in the year 1951.

== Incumbents ==
- Monarch: Juliana
- Prime Minister: Willem Drees

== Events ==
- 3 March: The Islands Regulation of the Netherlands Antilles is enacted by royal decree, describing the autonomy of the island territories of the Netherlands Antilles.
- 18 April: Moises Frumencio da Costa Gomez becomes Prime Minister of the Netherlands Antilles.
- date unknown: Broadcasting time is officially allocated to television by the national broadcasting companies in the Netherlands.

== Sports ==
- 1951–52 Netherlands Football League Championship

== Births ==
- 12 March: Harry Dijksma, politician
- 6 April: Bert Blyleven, Major League Baseball player
- 15 September: Johan Neeskens, football player and manager (d. 2024)
- 17 September: Piet Kleine, speed skater and coach
- 15 October: A. F. Th. van der Heijden, author
- 14 November: Jacob TV, composer
- 14 December: Jan Timman, chess player (d. 2026)

=== Undated ===
- Paul Schellekens, civil servant and diplomat

== Deaths ==
- 21 March: Willem Mengelberg, conductor (b. 1871)
- 21 April: Lambertus Johannes Toxopeus, lepidopterist (b. 1894)
