= List of ambassadors of the Netherlands to Peru =

Ambassador of the Netherlands to Peru
- Coat of arms of the Netherlands
- Incumbent; Alexander C. Kofman since 24 October 2023
- Type: Diplomatic representative
- Reports to: Ministry of Foreign Affairs

The ambassador of the Netherlands to Peru is the official representative of the government of the Kingdom of the Netherlands to the government of Peru.

Peru and the Netherlands established relations in 1826. Said relations were raised from Legation to Embassy in 1956.

== List of representatives ==
Representative	Term begin	Term end	Head of state	Notes
Wilhelm d'Artillac Grill	1921	1921	Augusto B. Leguía	Envoy Extraordinary on special mission to the Centennial of the Independence of Peru.
Gregoire van Haersma de Witt			Óscar R. Benavides	As chargé d'affaires.
Charles Daubauton	5 November 1955	1956		
Gerard Beelaerts van Blokland	28 July 1956	28 July 1956	Manuel Prado Ugarteche	Special Envoy sent to the inauguration of Manuel Prado Ugarteche. Son of Frans Beelaerts van Blokland.
Gerard Beelaerts van Blokland	1956	1960	Manuel Prado Ugarteche	As ambassador.
Dolf Vönker			Fernando Belaúnde Terry	As chargé d'affaires (a.i.)
Piet-Hein Houben	1977	1980	Francisco Morales Bermúdez	
Vicent Bruyns	1981	1985	Fernando Belaúnde Terry	
Hendrik C.R.M. Princen	30 January 1990	1993	Alan García	Also written "Hein Princen."
Jaap Axel Walkate	20 October 1993	c. 1997		
Paul Schellekens	2002	2006	Alejandro Toledo	
Barend van der Heijden	2007	2011	Alan García	
Adrian Paul Hamburger	30 September 2011	2013	Ollanta Humala	
Johan Lammert Christiaan van der Werff	5 November 2013	2015	Ollanta Humala	
Wiebe Jakob de Boer	2015	2019	Ollanta Humala	
Nathalie Lintvelt	2019	2023		
Alexander C. Kofman	24 October 2023	Incumbent	Dina Boluarte	

== See also ==
- List of ambassadors of Peru to the Netherlands
