= 1950 in the Netherlands =

- Decades: 1930s; 1940s; 1950s; 1960s; 1970s
- See also: Other events of 1950; History of the Netherlands

This article lists some of the events from 1950 related to the Netherlands.

== Incumbents ==
- Monarch: Juliana
- Prime Minister: Willem Drees

== Events ==
- April: Princess Beatrix, the Queen's daughter, enters the Incrementum at Baarnsch Lyceum to continue her education.

== Sports ==
- 1950–51 Netherlands Football League Championship
- 1950 Dutch Grand Prix
- 1950 Dutch TT

== Births ==
- 22 February: Lenny Kuhr, singer-songwriter
- 4 May: Magda Berndsen, politician and police officer
- 18 June: Heddy Lester, singer and actress
- 17 July: Derek de Lint, actor
- 26 October: René Stoute, poet and writer (d. 2000)
- 16 December: Roy Schuiten, cyclist (d. 2006)

== Deaths ==
- 23 April: Franciscus Janssens, 76th General Abbot of the Common Observance
