= 1975 in the Netherlands =

- Decades: 1950s; 1960s; 1970s; 1980s; 1990s
- See also: Other events of 1975; History of the Netherlands

This article lists some of the events from 1975 related to the Netherlands.

== Incumbents ==
- Monarch: Juliana (1948—1980)
- Prime Minister: Joop den Uyl (1973–1977)

== Events ==
=== November ===
- November 7 – A vapor cloud explosion at a petroleum cracking facility in Geleen, Netherlands leaves 14 dead and 109 injured, with fires lasting for five days.
- November 25 – Suriname gains independence from the Kingdom of the Netherlands.

=== Undated ===
- AGS (motorcycle manufacturer) is established.

== Births ==
- 2 January – Robert Westerholt, musician
- 22 January – Hanneke Boerma, diplomat and politician
- 4 March – Myrna Veenstra, field hockey player
- 9 March – Roy Makaay, footballer
- 29 March – Jan Bos, speed skater
- 8 April – Anouk, singer-songwriter and producer
- 23 May – Michiel van den Bos, video game composer
- 24 June – Remco van der Ven, cyclist
- 14 July – Flore Zoé, photographer
- 23 September – Ilse Saris, politician
- 22 December – Gerben de Knegt, cyclist

== Deaths ==
- April 5 – Victor Marijnen, Dutch politician and jurist, 40th Prime Minister of the Netherlands (b. 1917)
