= Den Ouden =

Den Ouden is a Dutch surname meaning "the elder", as opposed to the much more common surname De Jong ("the younger"). In modern Dutch the description is de Oude. People with this name include:

Surname

- Frits Jan Willem den Ouden (1914–2012), Dutch bomber pilot during World War II
- Geert den Ouden (born 1978), Dutch footballer
- Guy den Ouden (born 2002), Dutch tennis player
- Natasha den Ouden (born 1973), Dutch racing cyclist
- Willy den Ouden (1918–1997), Dutch swimmer; 100-meter freestyle world record holder for 23 year

As a description

- Artus Quellinus de Oude (1609–1668), Flemish Sculptor
- Cornelis Evertsen de Oude (1610–1666), Dutch admiral
- Jan de Oude (1536–1606), Count of Nassau-Dillenburg

== See also ==
- Den Oudsten, a Dutch coach builder and a surname meaning "the eldest"
- Peter den Oudsten (born 1958), Labor Party politician
