= Heestert Military Cemetery =

CWGC cemetery in Belgium

Heestert
- Commonwealth War Graves Commission
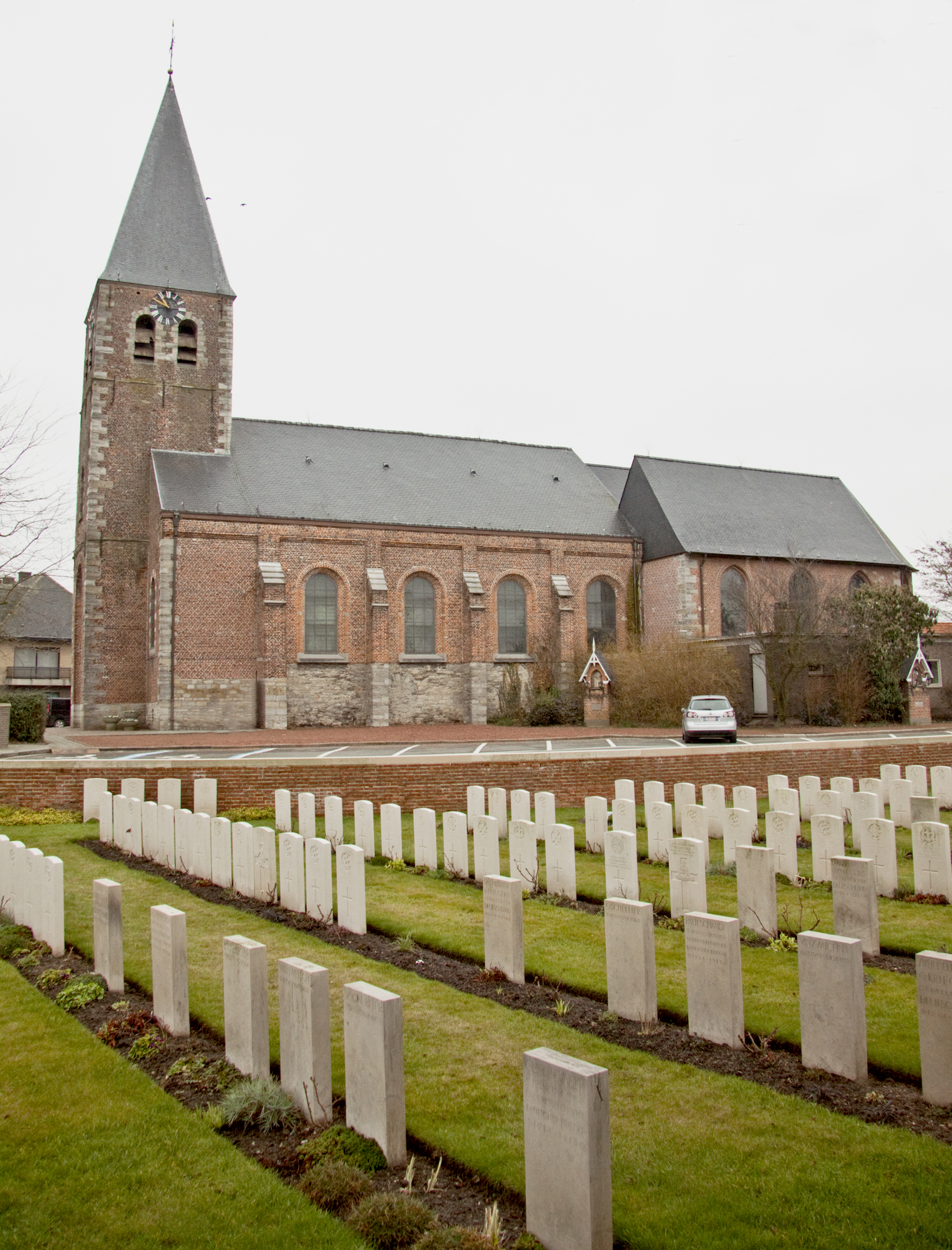
- Used for those deceased 1918
- Established: 1919
- Location: 50°46′52.6″N 3°24′41.8″E near Heestert, Zwevegem, West Flanders, Belgium
- Designed by: William Harrison Cowlishaw
- Total burials: 184
- Unknowns: 65

Burials by nation
- Allied Powers: United Kingdom: 127; Central Powers: Germany: 57

Burials by war
- World War I: 184
- Statistics source: CWGC and ww1cemeteries

Heestert Military Cemetery is a British military cemetery with casualties from the First World War, located in the Belgian village of Heestert in the Zwevegem municipality. The cemetery was designed by William Harrison Cowlishaw and is located between the Onze-Lieve-Vrouw Assumption Church and the village cemetery. It is maintained by the Commonwealth War Graves Commission. There are 184 graves and a Cross of Sacrifice.

== History ==
Heestert was held by the Germans from the start of the war. It was only taken by the British at the end of October 1918; almost all of the graves are of those who died in the period 21-25 October 1918. The cemetery was built around February 1919 by local farmers. They brought the British and German victims from the battlefield and their farms here to bury them under instruction from the mayor . The cemetery was reorganized in 1920, with the German graves being moved to the south parts of each row. Later that year three more British graves were transferred here from the cemetery at Moen.

184 victims are buried, including 127 Britons (of which 26 could not be identified) and 57 Germans (of which 39 could not be identified). Special memorials were set up for 8 Britons who were known or believed to be buried in the cemetery but whose actual plot was lost or destroyed.

This cemetery was protected as a monument in 2009.

== Distinguished soldiers ==
- Arthur Keith Harding, captain in the Queen's Own (Royal West Kent Regiment), and Thistle Robinson, lieutenant in the Royal Fusiliers and son of Richard Atkinson Robinson), were awarded the Military Cross (MC).
- Corporals JG Young and Harry Shortman Peter Burridge and Privates F. Byrne, T. Grindle, FJ Boulton, TW Gelder, Harry Richard Foulger and Abraham Barker received the Military Medal (MM).
