= Heestert =

Coordinates: 50°47′N 3°25′E

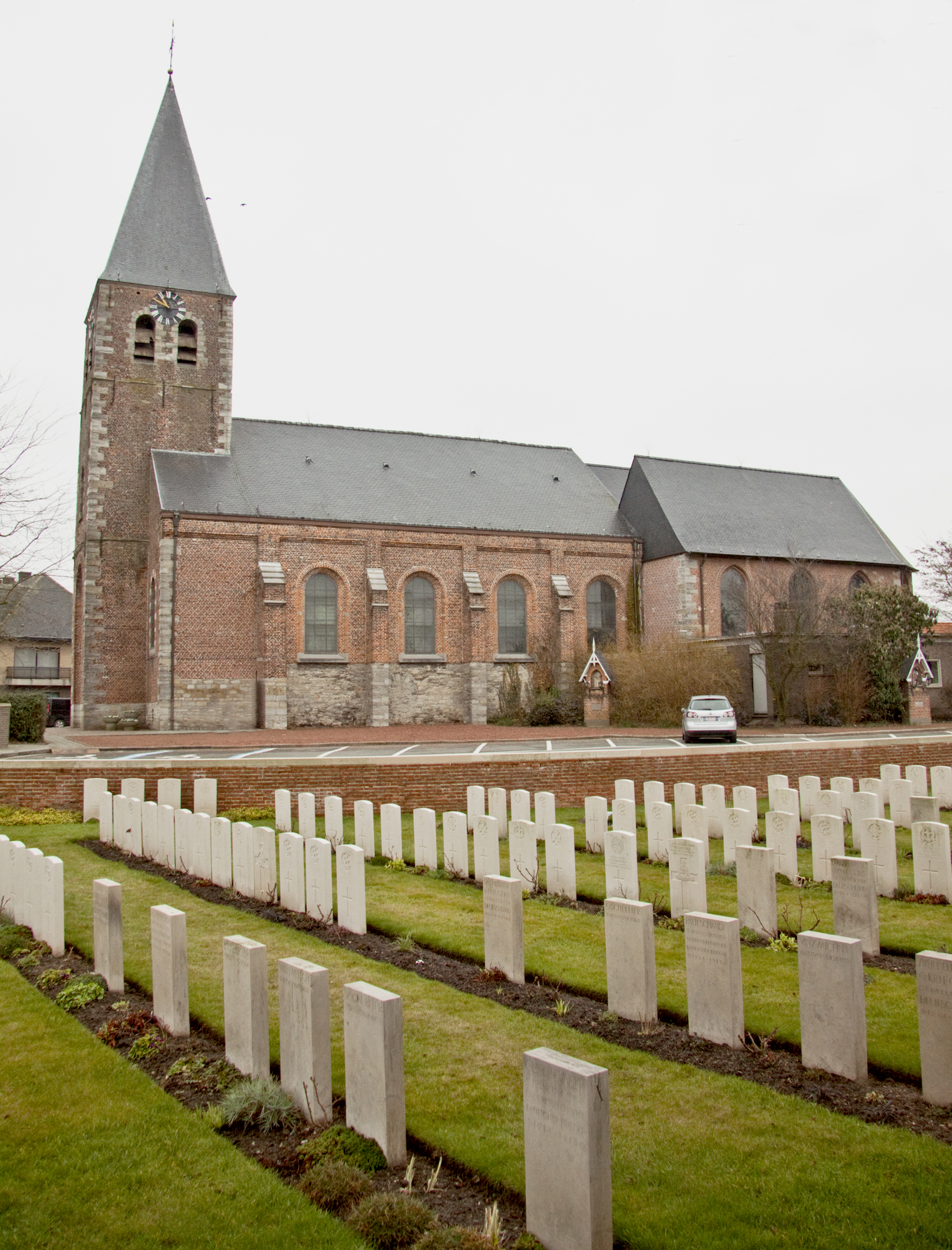
Heestert church

Heestert is a village in the south of the Belgian province of West Flanders and since 1976 has been part of the Zwevegem municipality. It has an area of 13 km^{2} and population of 2,880.

The Onze-Lieve-Vrouw Assumption Church includes a late Gothic choir and two side chapels of the former church from 1500. In 1771, a new single-aisled nave with a western tower was built. The church was restored after burning down in 1931. Next to the church is the Heestert Military Cemetery with the graves of 127 British soldiers and 57 Germans who died at the end of October 1918 during the Hundred Days Offensive.
