= 1972 in the Netherlands =

- Decades: 1950s; 1960s; 1970s; 1980s; 1990s
- See also: Other events of 1972; History of the Netherlands

This article lists some of the events from 1972 related to the Netherlands.

== Incumbents ==
- Monarch: Juliana (1948—1980)
- Prime Minister: Barend Biesheuvel (1971–1973)

== Events ==
- 29 November – The legal sale of cannabis in the Netherlands begins with the opening "tea house" Mellow Yellow, on the Amstel River in Amsterdam.

== Births ==
- 17 February – Sandra Palmen, Dutch politician
- 4 March – Jos Verstappen, racing driver
- 16 May – Roy Poels, judoka

== Deaths ==
- 18 April – Henriette Geertruida Veth, Dutch lawyer
