= 1914 in the Netherlands =

- Decades: 1890s; 1900s; 1910s; 1920s; 1930s
- See also: Other events of 1914; History of the Netherlands

Events from the year 1914 in the Netherlands

== Incumbents ==
- Monarch: Wilhelmina
- Prime Minister: Pieter Cort van der Linden

== Establishments ==
- VRA Amsterdam
- Ambachtsschool, Heerlen
- Bank Nederlandse Gemeenten
- Netherlands Naval Aviation Service

== Disestablishments ==
- RAP (football club)

== Births ==
- 8 April – Hebe Charlotte Kohlbrugge, theologian (died 2016)
- 12 April – Adriaan Blaauw, astronomer (died 2010)
- 12 May – Bertus Aafjes, poet (died 1993)
- 23 July - Frits Jan Willem den Ouden, pilot (died 2012)
- 26 October - Alfred Haighton, businessman and fascist leader (died 1943)
- 20 September - Francis Steinmetz, Dutch military officer (died 2006)

== Deaths ==
- 1 April - Louise Sophie Blussé, writer, 95
