= Ernst Jansen Steur =

Dutch neurologist (1945–2023)

- Jansen Steur in 2013
- Born: Ernst Nicolaas Herman Jansen; 24 October 1945; Kamperland, Netherlands
- Died: December 2023 (aged 78); Bad Bentheim, Lower Saxony, Germany
- Education: Maastricht University (dr.)
- Medical career
- Profession: Physician
- Field: Neurologist
- Institutions: Medisch Spectrum Twente, the Schlossberg Klinik in Bad Laasphe and the Klinik am Gesundbrunnen hospital in Heilbronn
- Research: Alzheimer's disease, Parkinson's disease and multiple sclerosis

Ernst Nicolaas Herman Jansen (24 October 1945 – December 2023), later known as Ernst Jansen Steur, was a Dutch neurologist whose medical practice became the subject of a major medical, disciplinary and criminal case in the Netherlands that also attracted international media attention.

The case was accompanied by intense and highly critical media coverage. In its 2014 judgment, the District Court of Overijssel itself criticised aspects of the reporting as "unremitting and intrusive", noting that Jansen Steur had been compared with Josef Mengele, portrayed as a criminal before the proceedings had concluded, and that allegations against him had at times been presented as established facts. In February 2014, the District Court of Overijssel, sitting in Almelo, sentenced Jansen Steur to three years' imprisonment after finding, among other offences, that he had intentionally harmed the health of several patients.

On appeal in June 2015, the Arnhem-Leeuwarden Court of Appeal acquitted him of all medical offences before it. In reaching that conclusion, the court considered evidence that Jansen Steur had been highly engaged with his patients, had devoted substantial time and attention to their care, and that aspects of his diagnostic conduct were consistent with his assertion that he had acted in good faith.

In May 2016, the Supreme Court of the Netherlands dismissed the prosecution's appeal in cassation, making the acquittals of the medical offences final.

== Career ==
Ernst Nicolaas Herman Jansen, later known as Ernst Jansen Steur was born on 24 October 1945. He worked in several positions, including the Medisch Spectrum Twente (MST). During his career he was noted within his profession for his research into Alzheimer's disease, Parkinson's disease and multiple sclerosis.

Jansen Steur completed his doctoral research in 1994 at the Maastricht University, researching Parkinson's disease.

Jansen Steur was interviewed as an expert on the disease by the Dutch television program EénVandaag on 24 July 2002 regarding the condition of Prince Claus (Jansen Steur indicated on the show that he found the prince's condition "worrisome").

Jansen Steur suffered a serious car accident in Germany in 1990, resulting in a complex hip fracture. In 2000 he became addicted to midazolam, a benzodiazepine sedative.

Jansen Steur was forced to resign from the MST by the board in 2004. He received a €250,000 severance package and was forced to sign a non-disclosure agreement (together with his former colleagues). As part of this deal, he agreed to strike himself from the Dutch registry of medical professionals, thereby giving up the right to practice in the Netherlands. Patients received financial compensation, but were sworn to secrecy.

== Investigation and prosecution ==
Despite the deal with Jansen Steur (resulting in his resignation from MST and voluntary removal from the registry), the board of MST decided to begin an investigation in 2009 due to a turnover of board members which included the installation of Herre Kingma as the new chairman. The investigation was headed by Wolter Lemstra, the former mayor of Hengelo. The Lemstra committee reported on 1 September 2009, concluding failures on the part of the MST but also of the Dutch Health Care Inspectorate ((in Dutch): Inspectie voor de Gezondheidszorg or IGZ), which was headed by Kingma at the time that Jansen was being sent away from the MST. The committee also concluded Jansen had been failing as a doctor since 1992 and that the MST had failed to address the situation for years.

Upon the release of this report, the Dutch minister of Health Ab Klink instituted another investigative committee headed by Rein Jan Hoekstra, to investigate the functioning of the Health Care Inspectorate.

This committee supported the conclusions of the Lemstra committee regarding the failing of the Inspectorate, concluding that the Inspectorate waited far too long to take measures against Jansen and should have filed criminal charges against him rather than settling for a voluntary relinquishing of his status as a physician. They also criticized the MST and the doctors treating Jansen Steur for his injuries in that they did not cooperate fully with the investigation by the Inspectorate. Both of Jansen's doctors invoked physician–patient privilege. However, the Inspectorate concluded in an internal investigation concluded on 17 February 2009 that they had functioned correctly in the matter of Jansen Steur.

It was announced in October 2009 that Jansen Steur would have to face charges in court after all, charges having been leveled by a special investigative team of the police for this case (the Lippstadt-team). The team had, by that point, gathered 135 different complaints from patients regarding Jansen Steur. The justice department called the case "the biggest medical trial in the Netherlands ever".

=== Trial and appeals ===
The criminal proceedings against Jansen Steur began in November 2012. The Public Prosecution Service charged him with 21 offences. These included allegations that, through incorrect diagnoses and treatment, he had caused serious physical and psychological harm to nine patients and had contributed to the suicide of one patient. He was also charged with theft, embezzlement and forgery. In total, 40 people had filed complaints against him.

On 11 February 2014, the District Court of Overijssel, sitting in Almelo, sentenced Jansen Steur to three years' imprisonment. The court found that he had intentionally harmed the health of eight patients, resulting in serious physical injury and, in one case, death. It also convicted him of stealing a prescription pad, falsifying authorisation forms and prescriptions, and embezzlement. Jansen Steur and the prosecution both appealed parts of the judgment.

On 18 June 2015, the Arnhem-Leeuwarden Court of Appeal, sitting in Arnhem, acquitted Jansen Steur of all of the medical offences before it. The court held that the evidence did not establish the criminal intent (opzet) required for conviction. It distinguished serious breaches of professional standards or negligence from conditional intent (voorwaardelijk opzet), for which it had to be established that Jansen Steur had consciously accepted the substantial risk that his conduct would harm his patients.

The Court of Appeal also identified evidence which it considered indicative of an absence of intent. It noted that Jansen Steur had consistently maintained that, although he had made errors of judgement, he had acted in good faith. The court held that this account received some support from the patients' medical records: he had taken medical histories, ordered additional investigations and differential diagnostic tests, and some nuclear-medicine reports had described findings as potentially compatible with Alzheimer's disease or neurodegenerative abnormalities. The judgment additionally referred to testimony from colleagues and nursing staff describing Jansen Steur as highly involved with his patients and as someone who made considerable efforts on their behalf. The court explicitly described such testimony as providing "indications that the defendant lacked intent" (aanwijzingen dat het verdachte aan opzet ontbrak). The court nevertheless stated that the established facts could potentially have supported prosecution for offences based on culpable negligence, but such offences were already time-barred when the prosecution began.

The acquittals did not affect several non-medical convictions which had already become final because they were outside the scope of the appeal. These concerned theft of a prescription pad, falsification of documents and prescriptions, and embezzlement. For these offences the Court of Appeal determined that a six-month suspended prison sentence, with a two-year probationary period, would have been appropriate.

The Public Prosecution Service appealed the medical acquittals to the Supreme Court of the Netherlands. On 17 May 2016, the Supreme Court rejected the prosecution's appeal and allowed the acquittals to stand. It held that the Court of Appeal had applied the correct legal test for conditional intent and that its conclusion that Jansen Steur had not consciously accepted the risk of injury to his patients was sufficiently reasoned. The acquittal of the medical offences thereby became final.

Accounts of Jansen Steur's clinical work were not uniformly negative. In January 2013, the director of a hospital in Worms, Germany, where Jansen Steur had subsequently worked, told NOS that the hospital had had "very good experiences" with him and that patients treated there had been positive about him. The director described him as popular with patients and stated that at that time no concerned patients had contacted the hospital about his work there.

During the criminal proceedings, some Dutch doctors also publicly challenged aspects of the prevailing account of the case. In October 2013, neurologist and emeritus professor Rien Vermeulen argued in an EenVandaag broadcast that the frequency of Jansen Steur's incorrect diagnoses was not exceptional and questioned whether diagnostic errors justified a prison sentence. His comments generated considerable controversy and were publicly criticised by his employer, the Academic Medical Center in Amsterdam.

Physician Metta de Noo subsequently undertook her own examination of the case and in 2015 published Frontaal: de andere kant van dokter Jansen Steur ("Frontaal: the other side of Dr Jansen Steur"). The book explicitly sought to present another perspective on the case and argued, among other things, that the possible consequences of a serious road accident suffered by Jansen Steur in 1990 had received insufficient attention. De Noo also presented her interpretation in national television appearances during the appeal proceedings, including on EenVandaag and Pauw, where she argued that the case against Jansen Steur required reassessment. Together with Vermeulen's earlier interventions, these appearances brought an alternative interpretation of the case into Dutch national media coverage.

== Trial by media ==
The Jansen Steur case was the subject of sustained and highly critical media coverage from 2009 onwards. In its 2014 judgment, the District Court of Overijssel itself commented on what it described as the "unremitting and intrusive" reporting about Jansen Steur. The court noted that he had been identified by his full name and portrayed as "Dr Frankenstein" and a "horror doctor", compared with Josef Mengele, and described as a criminal and an inhuman person. It also stated that allegations against him had at times been presented as established facts and that members of the public had been encouraged to discover and disclose his whereabouts. The reporting extended to his former wife, children, other relatives and acquaintances.

The court considered the scale and duration of this publicity sufficiently significant to take it into account in Jansen Steur's favour when determining his sentence. It stated that the publicity and the pressure of the continuing investigation had dominated and affected his life for many years. At the same time, the court observed that media attention had ultimately contributed to the opening of the criminal investigation. Health-law professor Joep Hubben similarly noted in 2014 that both the disciplinary case and the criminal prosecution followed extensive media attention, which had initially been generated by patients and their representatives.

The portrayal of Jansen Steur formed part of a wider debate in the Netherlands about the potential effects of intensive media coverage on criminal proceedings, sometimes described as a trial by media. A prominent Dutch example is the case of Lucia de Berk, a nurse in The Hague who was convicted of murdering and attempting to murder patients and sentenced to life imprisonment. Her convictions were subsequently reopened and she was formally acquitted in 2010 after further investigation concluded that none of the deaths for which she had been prosecuted could be classified as a crime. The Dutch judiciary now lists her case among recognised miscarriages of justice.

Legal scholars Chrisje Brants and Stewart Field have discussed the De Berk case as an example of the interaction between public opinion, media portrayal and criminal adjudication. They noted that De Berk had been subjected to a sustained campaign of negative characterisation and had repeatedly been depicted by the media as a witch, sometimes literally in cartoons. They argued that the courts and expert witnesses appeared to have been influenced by the preconception of guilt that had developed in public opinion, and that the appeal court had interpreted the evidence against her in a particularly adverse manner. The case has consequently been cited in Dutch legal scholarship in discussions of confirmation bias, tunnel vision and the possible effect of a strong public narrative of guilt on criminal fact-finding.

The legal outcome of the Jansen Steur case was different from that of De Berk. De Berk was ultimately exonerated after the deaths underlying her convictions were determined not to have been crimes. In Jansen Steur's case, the Arnhem-Leeuwarden Court of Appeal did not find that his medical practice had met professional standards, but in 2015 acquitted him of all medical criminal charges because the required criminal intent (opzet) had not been proved. The court also identified evidence pointing against the presence of intent. The Supreme Court of the Netherlands upheld those acquittals in 2016.

== Work in Germany after 2004 ==
After being forced out of the MST in 2004, Jansen Steur moved to Germany, where he worked for several private clinics. After Dutch correspondent Rob Vorkink tracked him down to the Schlossberg Klinik in Bad Laasphe and tried to interview him for RTV Oost, Jansen Steur was immediately fired from that institute.

The Netherlands was shocked on 4 January 2013 when the NOS evening news led with the story that Jansen Steur had found another job as a neurologist in the Klinik am Gesundbrunnen hospital in Heilbronn. He was discovered there by the same Rob Vorkink, who recognized Jansen Steur's voice in a phone call (despite his denying that he was the same person). NOS reporter Marc Hamer verified his identity by passing around photographs among hospital personnel. He was subsequently fired from the hospital on 5 January 2013.

Although the hospital noted at first that Jansen Steur had been allowed to work at the hospital because he left his profession voluntarily in the Netherlands in 2010 (preventing the hospital from checking his credentials with the Dutch registry) and as there were no criminal convictions against him when he applied to the hospital, it soon transpired that the hospital had in fact been aware of Jansen's past.

On 6 January 2013, a German patient filed charges over the treatment she received from Jansen Steur in Heilbronn, which she claimed left her requiring the use of a wheelchair.

Jansen Steur died from pneumonia in December 2023, at the age of 78.

== Other ==
Steur was the doctor's mother's maiden name. He added this name to his surname of "Jansen", which is one of the most common surnames in the Netherlands, and is known to the general public as "Ernst Jansen Steur".
