= Zwevegem =

- Municipality
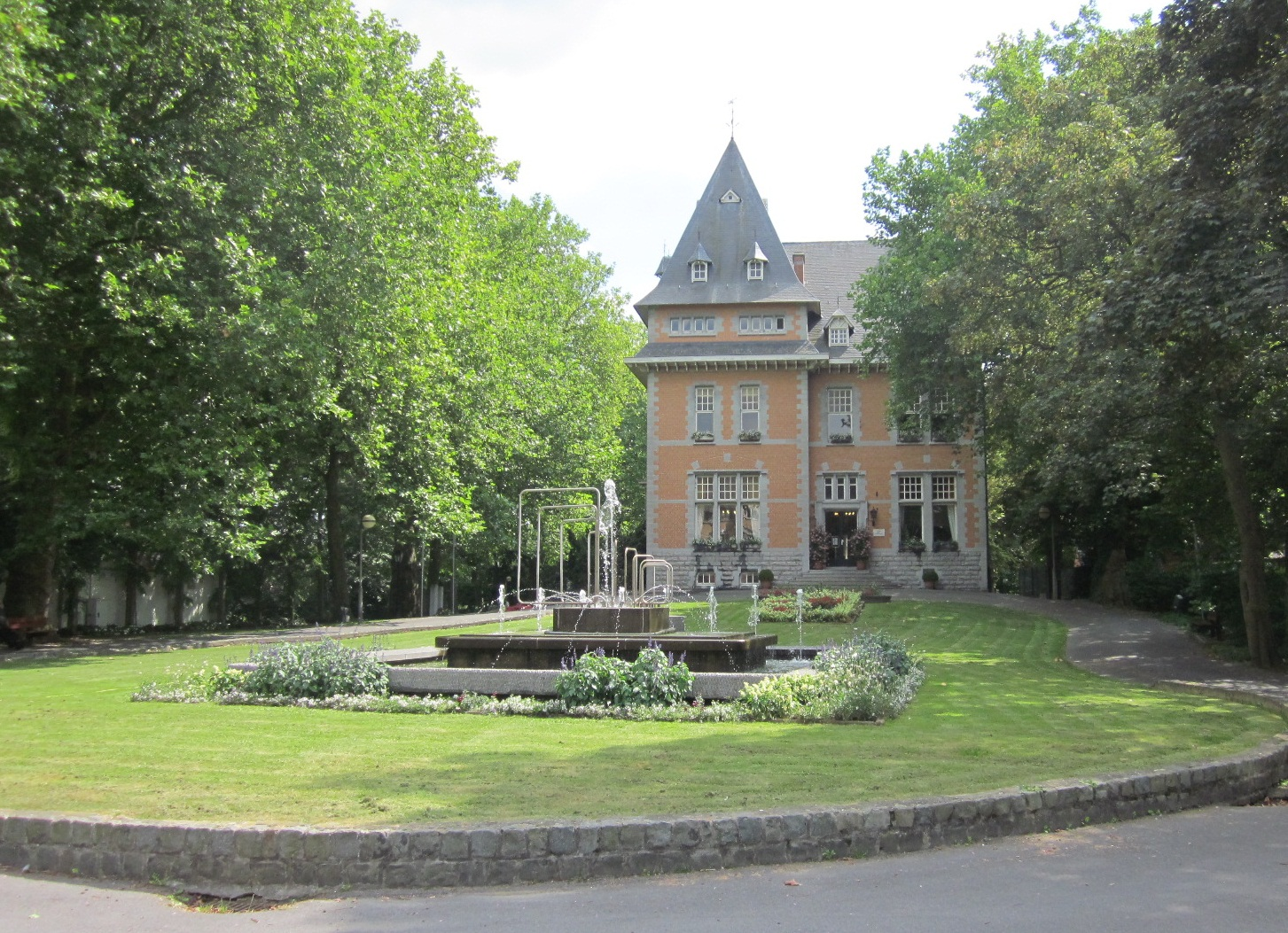
- Zwevegem former town hall

- Flag Coat of arms

- Location of Zwevegem in West-Flanders
- Interactive map of Zwevegem
- Location in Belgium
- Coordinates: 50°48′N 03°20′E
- Country: Belgium
- Community: Flemish Community
- Region: Flemish Region
- Province: West Flanders
- Arrondissement: Kortrijk

Government
  - Mayor: Isabelle Degezelle
  - Governing parties: CD&V, NV-A

Area
  - Total: 63.61 km^{2} (24.56 sq mi)

Population (2018-01-01)
  - Total: 24,619
  - Density: 387.0/km^{2} (1,002/sq mi)
- Postal codes: 8550-8554
- NIS code: 34042
- Area codes: 056
- Website: www.zwevegem.be

Zwevegem (Dutch pronunciation: [ˈzʋeːvəɣɛm]) is a municipality located in the Belgian province of West Flanders. The municipality comprises the towns of Heestert, Moen, Otegem, Sint-Denijs and Zwevegem. On January 1, 2019, Zwevegem had a total population of 24,648. The total area is 63.24 km^{2} which gives a population density of 380 inhabitants per km^{2}.

The Bekaert company was founded in Zwevegem by Baron Leon Leander Bekaert.

Heestert Military Cemetery holds the graves of 127 Britons and 57 Germans, most of whom died on 21–25 October 1918 in the area during the First World War.

== Twin towns ==
Zwevegem is twinned with:

- Lorsch, Germany
- Le Coteau, France

== Notable people ==
- Léon Antoine Bekaert (1891–1961), businessman
- Christian Dumolin, businessman
- Gella Vandecaveye, judoka
