= 1973 in the Netherlands =

- Decades: 1950s; 1960s; 1970s; 1980s; 1990s
- See also: Other events of 1973; History of the Netherlands

This article lists some of the events from 1973 related to the Netherlands.

== Incumbents ==
- Monarch: Juliana
- Prime Minister: Barend Biesheuvel (until 11 May 1973), Joop den Uyl (after 11 May 1973)

== Events ==
- 29 July - 1973 Dutch Grand Prix
- 25 November - KLM Flight 861 is hijacked on an Amsterdam to Tokyo flight. All 247 passengers on board survive.

== Sports ==
- 1973 European Baseball Championship
- 1973 World Rhythmic Gymnastics Championships
- 1973 Amstel Gold Race
- 1973 European Athletics Indoor Championships
- 1973 Men's Hockey World Cup
- 1973 Tour de France

== Music ==
- List of Dutch Top 40 number-one singles of 1973

== Births ==
- 3 January - Wim Meulenkamp, politician
- 14 February - Wendy van Eijk, politician
- 13 November - Hester Veltman-Kamp, politician
