= 1974 in the Netherlands =

- Decades: 1950s; 1960s; 1970s; 1980s; 1990s
- See also: Other events of 1974; History of the Netherlands

Events during the year 1974 in the Netherlands.

== Incumbents ==
- Monarch – Juliana
- Prime Minister – Joop den Uyl

== Births ==
- 11 January – Natascha Wingelaar, politician
- 4 February – Mijntje Donners, field hockey player
- 1 March – Marjolein Moorman, politician
- 19 March – Nicole Maes, politician
- 21 May – Margje Teeuwen, field hockey player
- 9 August – Dillianne van den Boogaard, field hockey player

== Deaths ==
- 13 January – Wim Groskamp, association footballer (born 1886)
- 11 February – Jan Plantaz, cyclist (born 1930)
- 13 March – Frans de Vreng, cyclist (born 1898)
- 15 October – Jan Everse Sr, association footballer (born 1922)
- 21 November – Frank Martin, Swiss composer (died 1890 in Switzerland)
