= Netherlands–Peru relations =

Diplomatic relations between the Netherlands and Peru

- Netherlands: Peru

Diplomatic mission
- Embassy of the Netherlands, Lima: Embassy of Peru, The Hague

Netherlands–Peru relations refers to the bilateral relations between the Kingdom of the Netherlands and the Republic of Peru. The Netherlands has an embassy in Lima, while Peru has an embassy in The Hague and a consulate-general in Amsterdam. Both countries belonged to the Spanish Empire until the Eighty Years' War (the Dutch Revolt) when the Dutch separated from the Spanish crown, Peru and the Netherlands are members of the United Nations.

== History ==
Peru and the Netherlands established relations in 1826. During World War II, Peru maintained relations with the Dutch government-in-exile, based in London. Relations were raised from Legation to Embassy in 1956.

== High-level visits ==
High-level visits from the Netherlands to Peru

- Prince Bernhard of Lippe-Biesterfeld (1952)
- Commander Matthieu Borsboom (2014)

High-level visits from Peru to the Netherlands

- President Manuel Prado (1960)

== Trade ==
The Netherlands and Peru have a trade agreement through the Trade Agreement between Peru and the European Union. The agreement entered into force on March 1, 2013. Investments by the Netherlands include the port of Callao, the Makro store chain, as well as other companies.

A strong point of commercial relations is the agricultural sector, as both countries have developed strong ties in said sector since 2019. The Netherlands is the largest importer of Peruvian fruit and (the second largest importer of) vegetables worldwide.

== Diaspora ==
Diaspora groups exist in both countries, with the number of Peruvians in the Netherlands numbered at 71,788 in 2020.

== Resident diplomatic missions ==
- Netherlands has an embassy in Lima.
- Peru has an embassy in The Hague, and a consulate-general in Amsterdam.
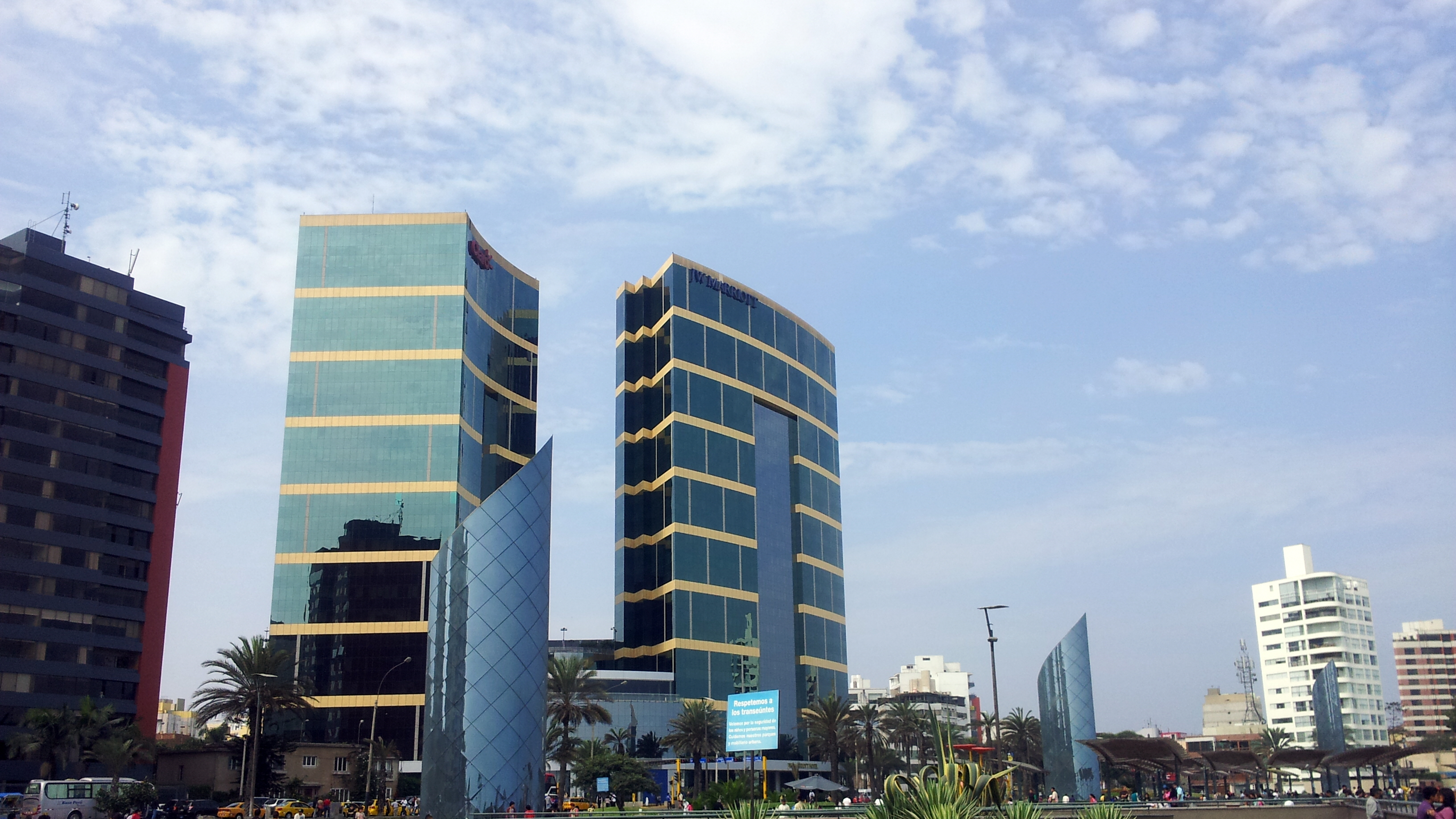
The Torre Parque Mar, which hosts the Dutch Embassy in Lima

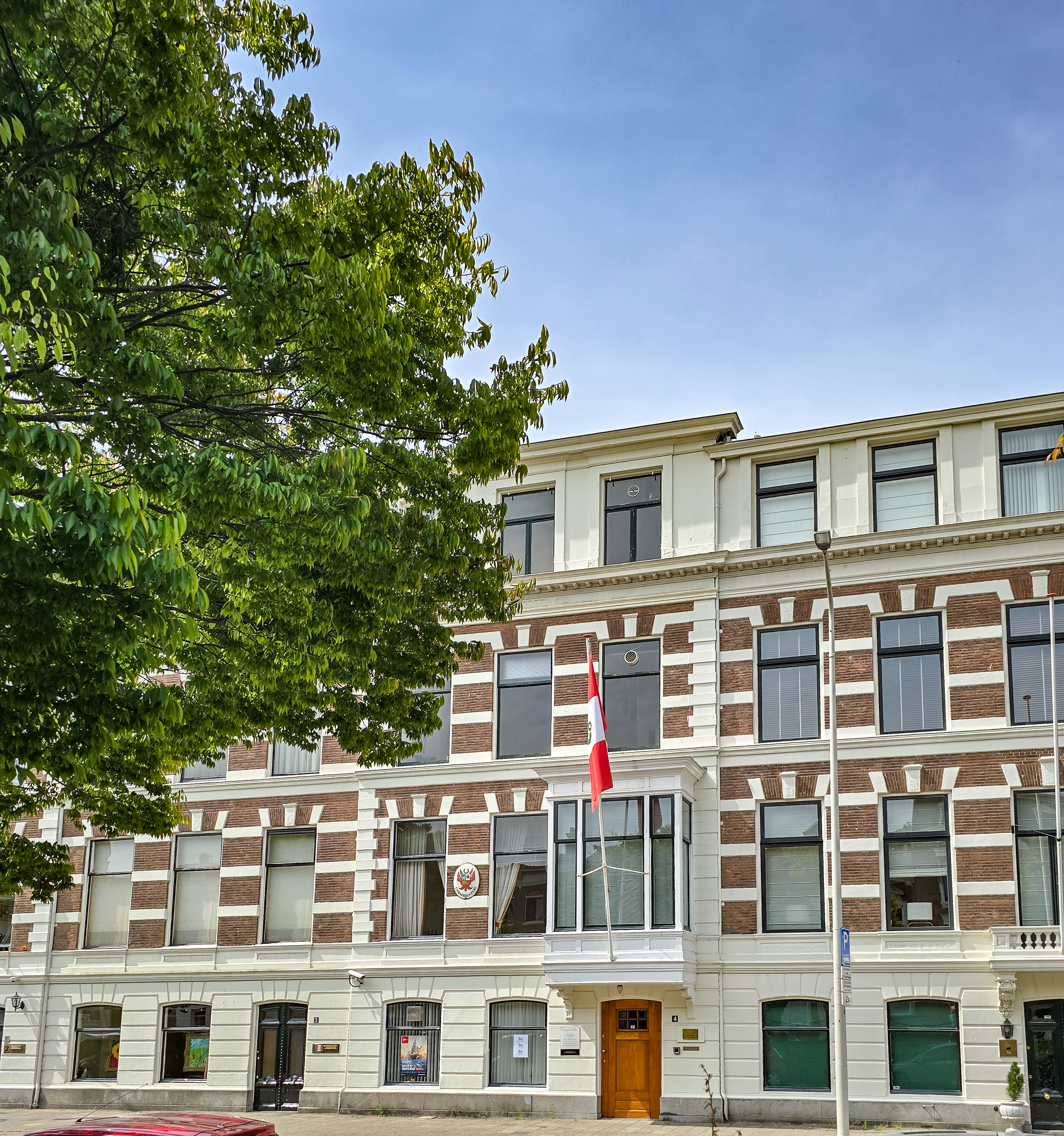
Peruvian embassy in The Hague

== See also ==
- Foreign relations of the Netherlands
- Foreign relations of Peru
- List of ambassadors of the Netherlands to Peru
- List of ambassadors of Peru to the Netherlands
