= 1845 in the Netherlands =

Events from the year 1845 in the Netherlands

== Incumbents ==
- Monarch: William II

== Events ==
- Netherlands Entomological Society
- De Tijd
- 1845 Netherlands potato famine
