= Joop Kolkman =

Joseph Willem (Joop) Kolkman (1 December 1896 – 8 February 1944) was a Dutch journalist and diplomat. During World War II he worked as vice-consul in Perpignan, France and helped save numerous Jewish refugees from persecution. In 2014 he was posthumously awarded the title Righteous Among the Nations by Israel's institute of Holocaust remembrance Yad Vashem.

== Biography ==
Kolkman was born on 1 December 1896 in The Hague. Until the German invasion of France, Kolkman worked as a journalist for the newspapers De Telegraaf and Nieuwe Rotterdamsche Courant in Paris. Shortly thereafter he was sent to the city of Perpignan in Vichy France to serve as vice-consul. During the war he used his possibilities as a diplomat to help Dutch refugees, many of them Jewish, by finding them safe houses, providing them with financial aid and rescuing them from concentration camps. This enabled them to get to safety in Spain and Portugal, from which they could cross to England. Many of his actions were illegal, including the forging of documents. He is estimated to have saved hundreds of persons. In early 1943 Kolkman tried to flee by crossing the Pyrenees into Spain, he was however arrested by German patrol units. In 1944 Kolkman died in the Buchenwald concentration camp, although other sources mention Majdanek.

A plaque remembering Kolkman is placed next to the entrance of the building of the Dutch Ministry of Foreign Affairs. In 2014 he was posthumously awarded the title Righteous Among the Nations. The award was presented by the Israeli ambassador to the Netherlands, Haim Divon, to the Secretary General-General of the Dutch Ministry of Foreign Affairs, Renée Jones-Bos, in the presence of the Dutch Minister of Foreign Affairs, Frans Timmermans.

== Awards ==
- Médaille de la Résistance, France, 31 March 1947.
- Croix de guerre 1939–1945 with palm, France, 16 April 1948.
- Righteous Among the Nations, Israel, 17 February 2014.
