= Saskia Holleman =

Dutch actress, lawyer and model (1945–2013)

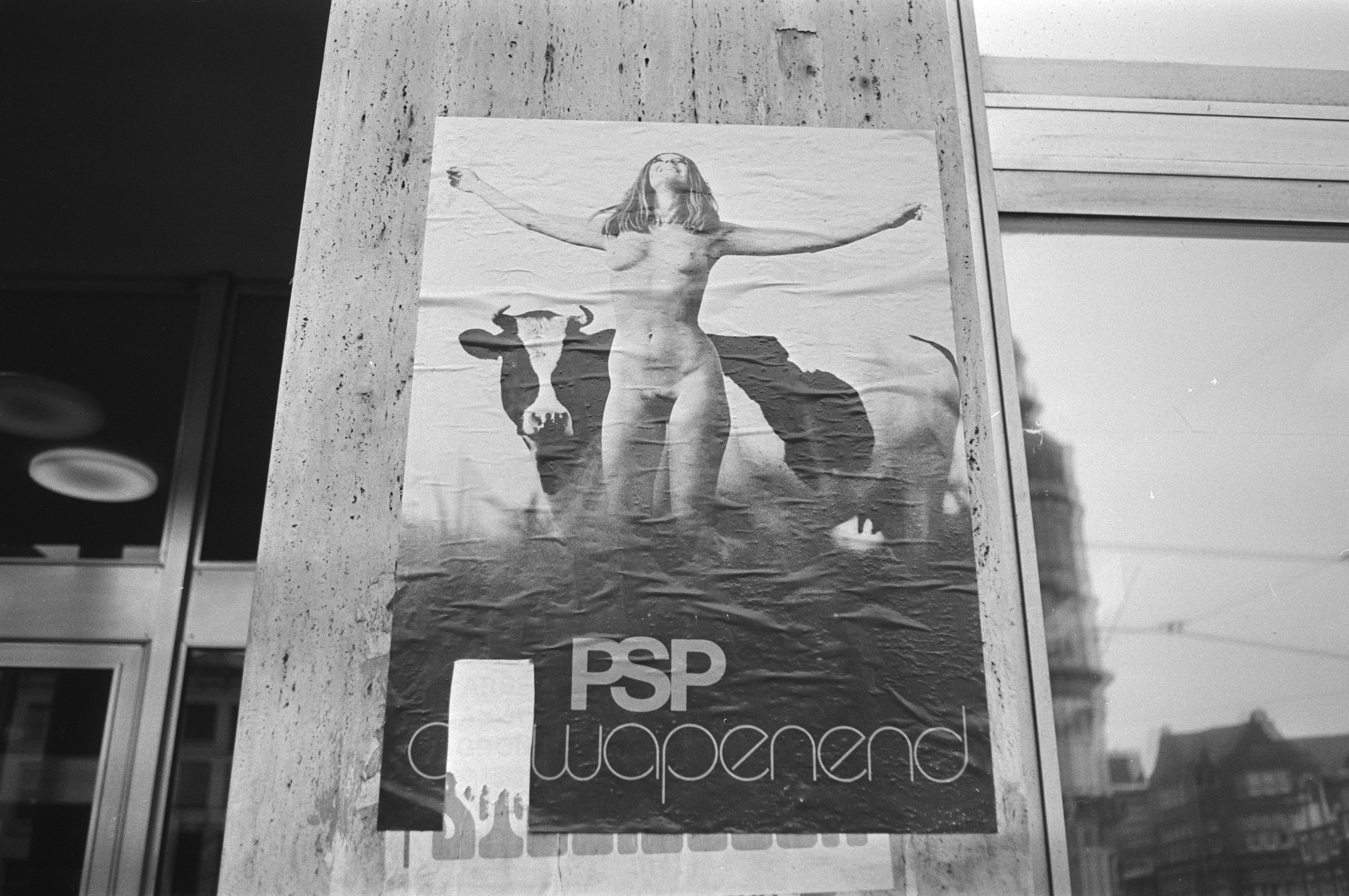
- Pacifist Socialist Party poster featuring Holleman, 1971
- Born: 20 May 1945; Leeuwarden, Netherlands
- Died: 10 June 2013 (aged 68); Amsterdam, Netherlands
- Occupations: Actress; Lawyer; Model
- Years active: 1967–2013
- Spouse: Peter Verstegen (m. 1989)

Saskia Holleman (20 May 1945 – 10 June 2013) was a Dutch actress, lawyer and model. She became widely known in the Netherlands when a picture in which she was naked in a meadow was used by the left-wing, pacifist political party Pacifist Socialist Party for its electoral campaign during the 1971 Dutch general election. Holleman trained as a lawyer in the 1970s and she specialised in petty crime for law firms and later as an independent.

== Early life ==
On 20 May 1945, Holleman was born in Leeuwarden. She was the oldest daughter of the classicist at the Drachtster Lyceum and theatre founder Aloysius Wilhelmus Jozef Holleman and Frederika Catharina Johanna Jozefina Maria Jansen. Holleman had two other siblings and was raised as a Catholic. She moved around the Netherlands during her childhood and attended Gemeentelijk Lyceum Eindhoven, a school that she disliked. Hollemann was later educated at Lodewijk Makeblijde College and did stage performances while being a fan of ballet. She became fluent in Frisian while having her education in Dutch. Holleman had an application to study at the Academy of Theatre and Dance in rejected. Hollemann was later expelled from the Academy of Fine Arts in 1967 for reportedly insulting faculty and management.

== Career ==
She made her on-screen debut in 1967, being cast as the Girl in Dream of Harvey Keitel in the film directed by the American actor Martin Scorsese, Who's That Knocking at My Door. Holleman also had roles in the television productions Maigret and Rudi Carrell Show. In late 1968, she was in Annie M. G. Schmidt's reuve Met man en muis and performed the role at De Lawcl theatre. Holleman was in the revue Van toen tot nu by Snip en Snap in 1969, and danced with the René Sleeswijk Revue until November 1970. She filmed a role in the television programme Klatergoud that was broadcast in 1971.

On 4 August 1970, Holleman was the subject of a black-and-white photograph by Hendrik-Jan Koldeweij for the monthly magazine Sekstant published by the Dutch Society for Sexual Reform and was paid 300 gulden for the shoot. The shoot, which saw 150 photographs taken within the space of half an hour, saw one of the black-and-white images used as a poster by George Noordanus on a commission for the left-wing, pacifist political party Pacifist Socialist Party (PSP). It was publicly displayed by the party during the campaign for the 1971 Dutch general election held that April with the words "PSP ontwapenend" printed at the bottom. It depicts her wandering around a meadow close to Nootdorp sporting a light red wig that was not clearly visible whilst naked. Holleman was smiling with her arms spread up and a cow to her right looking into the camera. She received 1,250 gulden from the PSP and was fine with the poster being used across the Netherlands. Some posters were defaced with tape that covered Holleman's private body areas and the feminist group Dolle Mina objected to its use, publishing a poster with a naked man as a counter-measure. It was also not hung at Christian congregations and police in Tilburg raided a boutique carrying the poster in its window. The poster was named "one of the best election posters of all time" in 2011 even though the PSP had their representation reduced from four to two seats following the 1971 election.

Holleman decided to not do any more work in theatre and television. In 1972, she had the role of the reserve female lead of Sheila in the musical Hair. Holleman came into conflict with the producer of the musical over finances. She had a role in the 1974 erotic film compilation Wet Dreams by Lasse Braun, and went on to study law at the University of Amsterdam from 1973 to 1978. Holleman studied law on the advice of the translator Peter Verstegen when theatre work dried up upon her sustaining a leg injury; she was told by Verstegen that "the court is also a kind of theatre". After completing her studies, Holleman specialised in petty crime for the next 31 years. She first worked at the law firm Worst & Van Haersholte, then at Peter Ingelse and final as an independent lawyer in the basement of a canal house in Amsterdam. Holleman was a board member of the Netherlands of Women's World Banking organisation in the 1980s.

== Personal life ==
In mid-1972, she met Verstegen and the two married on 30 November 1989. There were no children of the marriage. In 2010, Holleman was diagnosed with the skin cancer squamous cell carcinoma. She died in Amsterdam on 10 June 2013.

== Reputation ==
Piet Koster of Het vrije volk described her as "the world's first naked political propagandist". Jan de Roos noted that the PSP poster made her recognisable to the Dutch public.
