= Christian Dumolin =

Belgian businessman (born 1945)

- Born: 1945 (age 80–81); Kortrijk of Sint-Denijs
- Education: Graduated in economics
- Occupation: Businessman

Christian Dumolin (born 1945, Kortrijk) of Sint-Denijs is a Belgian businessman, President and CEO of Koramic Investment Group, President and CEO of Koramic-Koceram and Vice-Chairman of Wienerberger Supervisory Board.

After he graduated in economics, he started his career in the insurance business. He took over the management of Koramic Building Products in 1980 and subsequently was appointed Chairman and Managing Director of the company. The Koramic group grew out of brick production and is active in construction material. Koramic is one of Europe's leading companies in the sector of tiles as well as one of the main divisions of the Austrian Wienerberger group. In addition Christian Dumolin was a regent of the National Bank of Belgium and also the Belgian businessman with the highest number of governing board mandates in: 129 mandates of which 7 paid.

== Koramic and Wienerberger ==
In 2003, Koramic Building Products, the company Dumolin had headed since 1980, and the Austrian building-materials group Wienerberger created a 50/50 joint venture called Koramic Roofing, covering Koramic's roof-tile business. On 18 May 2004, Wienerberger exercised its option to buy the remaining 50% of Koramic Roofing for approximately €211.5 million on a debt-free basis, financed through a capital increase, making Koramic Roofing a fully owned subsidiary. Wienerberger said the joint venture had exceeded its budget in 2003, and that the business had generated EBITDA of €50 million that year.

Following the sale of its roof-tile division, the Koramic group was restructured into an investment company, a transformation reported by De Tijd on 2 August 2005.

== Sources ==
- Koramic sells roof tiles division, Focus on Flanders, 11 January – 17 January 2003, Number 2, p. 6
- De rijkste families in West-Vlaanderen (Belgium) (in Dutch)
- Dumolin vormt Koramic om tot investeringsmaatschappij, De Tijd, 2 Aug. 2005
