= 1730 in the Netherlands =

Events from the year 1730 in the Dutch Republic

== Events ==
- Utrecht sodomy trials, a purge of homosexuals issued by the States of Holland
- Naval shipworms damaged wooden dike supports, threatened the Netherlands' flood defense and prompted engineering improvements.

== Births ==
- December 8 - Jan Ingenhousz, physiologist, biologist and chemist
- December 22 - Egbert de Vrij Temminck, prominent regent in Amsterdam
