= Jacobus Kann =

Dutch banker

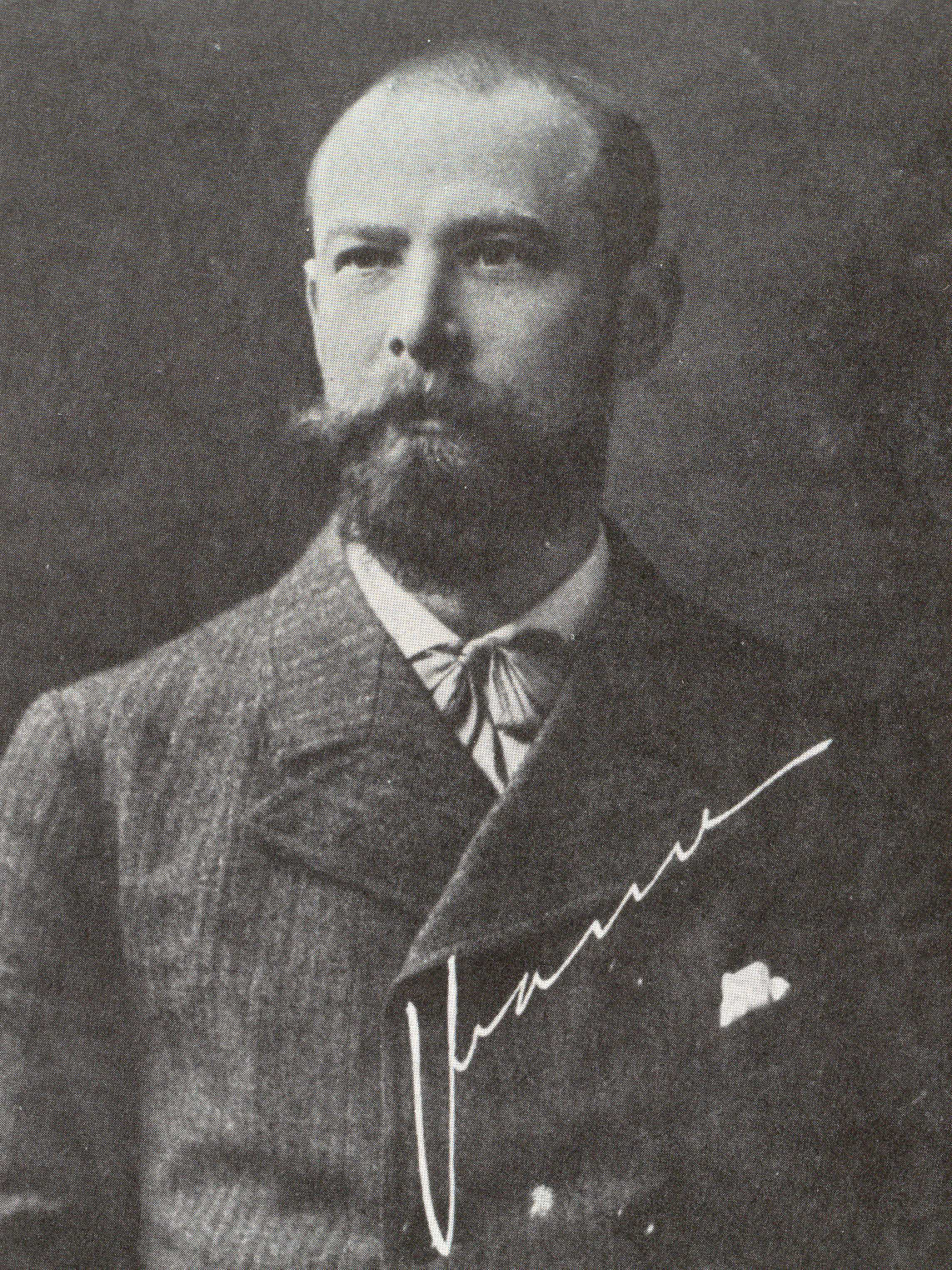
- Born: 12 July 1872; The Hague, Netherlands
- Died: 4 October 1944 (aged 72); Theresienstadt Ghetto, Protectorate of Bohemia and Moravia
- Citizenship: Netherlands
- Education: Finance
- Occupation(s): Banker, diplomat (in 1923–1927)
- Known for: Political Zionism
- Spouse: Adriana Anna Polak Daniels

Jacobus Henricus Kann (12 July 1872 – 7 October 1944) was a Dutch banker, diplomat, philanthropist and Jewish community leader. He was a prominent figure in the early years of the Zionist movement. He is best remembered for having purchased the land on which the centre of Tel Aviv now stands.

== Biography ==
Kann was born on 12 July 1872 in The Hague. Kann's father was a partner in the Lissa and Kann banking house. On his father's death in 1891, Jacobus inherited his position at the age of 19, which made him independently wealthy.

In the wake of the Dreyfus Affair, Kann became active in the Zionist movement. In 1897 he was a delegate to the First Zionist Congress in Basel. In 1899 he joined with the Netherlands Chief Rabbi Joseph Dunner to form the Nederlandsche Zionistenbond (Netherlands Zionist Federation, today called the Federatie Nederlandse Zionisten). He freely used his wealth to finance Jewish settlement in Eretz Israel (Ottoman Syria).

In 1907, at the request of leaders of the Yishuv, Kann purchased a tract of land of just north of the city of Jaffa, from an absentee landowner. This land (then mostly empty sand-dunes) was then subdivided and auctioned to sixty Jewish families, as the foundation of a new and wholly Jewish urban community. The settlement was originally called Ahuzat Bayit ("homestead") but in 1910 was renamed Tel Aviv ("Hill of Spring").

In 1908 Kann published Eretz Israel: Het Joodse Land (Eretz Israel: The Jewish Land), the first account in Dutch of modern Zionism. In 1910 he established the Jewish Agricultural, Livestock and Dairy Preparation Association, to train Dutch Jewish youth in agriculture prior to their emigration to Eretz Israel. During World War I, as a citizen of a neutral state, Kann acted as an intermediary between various Zionist leaders in the belligerent states.

After the war, Kann came into conflict with the Zionist leader Chaim Weizmann, and gradually became distanced from the Zionist movement. In 1924, however, the Dutch government appointed him Consul in Jerusalem. He held this position until 1927, when the illness of his wife led him to return to the Netherlands.

During the 1920s and 1930s, Kann concerned himself mainly with educational reform in the Netherlands, although he continued his financial support for Jewish settlement in Eretz Israel. He was one of the founders of the Nederlandsch Lyceum (now the Scholengemeenschap Het Nederlands Lyceum in The Hague.

When the Germans occupied the Netherlands in 1940, Kann, like all Dutch Jews, was dismissed from all his public and commercial positions. He was offered opportunities to leave the Netherlands, but refused to do so. In 1944 he and his wife were arrested and deported, first to Camp Barneveld and then to the Theresienstadt Ghetto in German-occupied Czechoslovakia (now the Czech Republic). He was then 72. They died there in October 1944.
