= Henriette Geertruida Veth =

Henriette Geertruida (Jet) Veth (Dordrecht, 7 August 1887 – Enschede, 18 April 1972) was a Dutch lawyer. She studied at the University of Amsterdam's Faculty of Law, receiving a Doctor of Laws. During her life, focused on the position of the child in Dutch law. She argued for separate children's judges since 1914 and for the removal of children under 14 from criminal law. In 1946, Veth was named a Knight in the Order of Orange-Nassau and in 1955 she was promoted to officer of that order.
