= Alaqsite'w Gitpu School =

Location
- 22 Caplin Rd. Listuguj, Quebec, G0C 2R0; Canada
- Coordinates: 48.016293°N 66.694944°W

Information
- Opened: September 1997
- Principal: Jeff Grass
- Grades: Nursery - Grade 8
- Language: English, French, and Mi'kmaq

Alaqsite'w Gitpu School (/əlɛksideɪoʊ ɡɪtpuː/) is a K-8 school located in the Listuguj Mi'gmaq First Nation. It opened in 1997. The school offers an English stream from Nursery to Grade 8, a French immersion program from Grades 3 to 8 as well as a Mi'kmaq immersion program from Nursery to Grade 4.
