= 1792 in the Netherlands =

Events from the year 1792 in the Dutch Republic

== Events ==
- - Dutch West India Company (defunct)
- The start of the French Revolutionary Wars that marked a turning point in the European politics that later affected the Dutch Republic.

== Births ==
• William II (1792–1849), King of the Netherlands, Grand Duke of Luxembourg, and Duke of Limburg
