= Medisch Spectrum Twente =

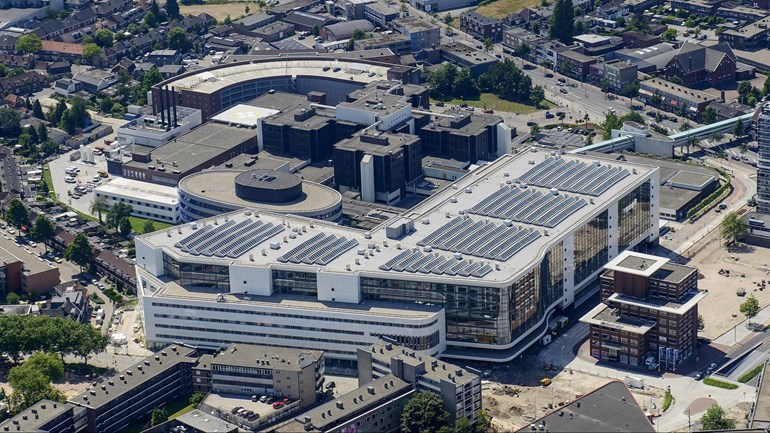

Geography
- Location: Enschede, Netherlands
- Coordinates: 52.2162°N 6.8908°E

Services
- Beds: 1,070

Links
- Website: www.mst.nl
- Lists: Hospitals in Netherlands

The Medisch Spectrum Twente (MST) is the hospital of the city of Enschede in The Netherlands. It is a clinical teaching center, offering secondary and limited tertiary care.

== History ==
Medisch Spectrum Twente was founded in 1990 as a result of a merger of two smaller hospitals in Enschede. This merger led to the construction of a new hospital building to replace the older facilities in the former two hospitals. The hospital has a license for 1,070 beds, over 200 medical specialists and circa 4,000 employees. Aside from the regular clinical departments, it also has tertiary care departments such as cardiothoracic surgery, neurosurgery, advanced oncological care, radiotherapy, bone marrow transplantations, hemodialysis, a large hospital pharmacy, and a European regional level I trauma center.

The hospital originally did not have its own trauma helicopter, but an ADAC helicopter from the neighboring German town of Rheine frequently crosses the border when the local Dutch ambulance control center requests it. When the hospital was renovated, it had a brand-new helicopter platform installed as a part of the renovations.

== Satellite location ==
=== Oldenzaal ===
The MST includes a small location in the town of Oldenzaal. It is mainly an ambulatory facility, though some small low-risk surgeries which do not require more than two days of hospitalization are also performed there. Most regular diagnostic procedures can be carried out in the Oldenzaal facility. Almost all specialties have a satellite department there. It also has a small urgent care department which is open in the morning, afternoon and evening but not at night; ambulances do not bring patients here, but drive them directly to the main facility in Enschede instead. The hospital's 1,070 beds include the Oldenzaal location as well.
