= 1585 in the Dutch Republic =

Events from the year 1585 in the Dutch Republic

== Events ==
- - Battle of Empel
- - Siege of IJsseloord
- - Treaty of Nonsuch
