= Tjeerd Pasma =

Dutch modern pentathlete

Personal information
- Born: 24 June 1904 Rinsumageast, Netherlands
- Died: 28 December 1944 (aged 40) Ede, Netherlands

Sport
- Sport: Modern pentathlon

Tjeerd Pasma (24 June 1904 – 28 December 1944) was a Dutch modern pentathlete. He competed at the 1928 Summer Olympics.
