= Magda Berndsen =

Dutch politician and police officer (born 1950)

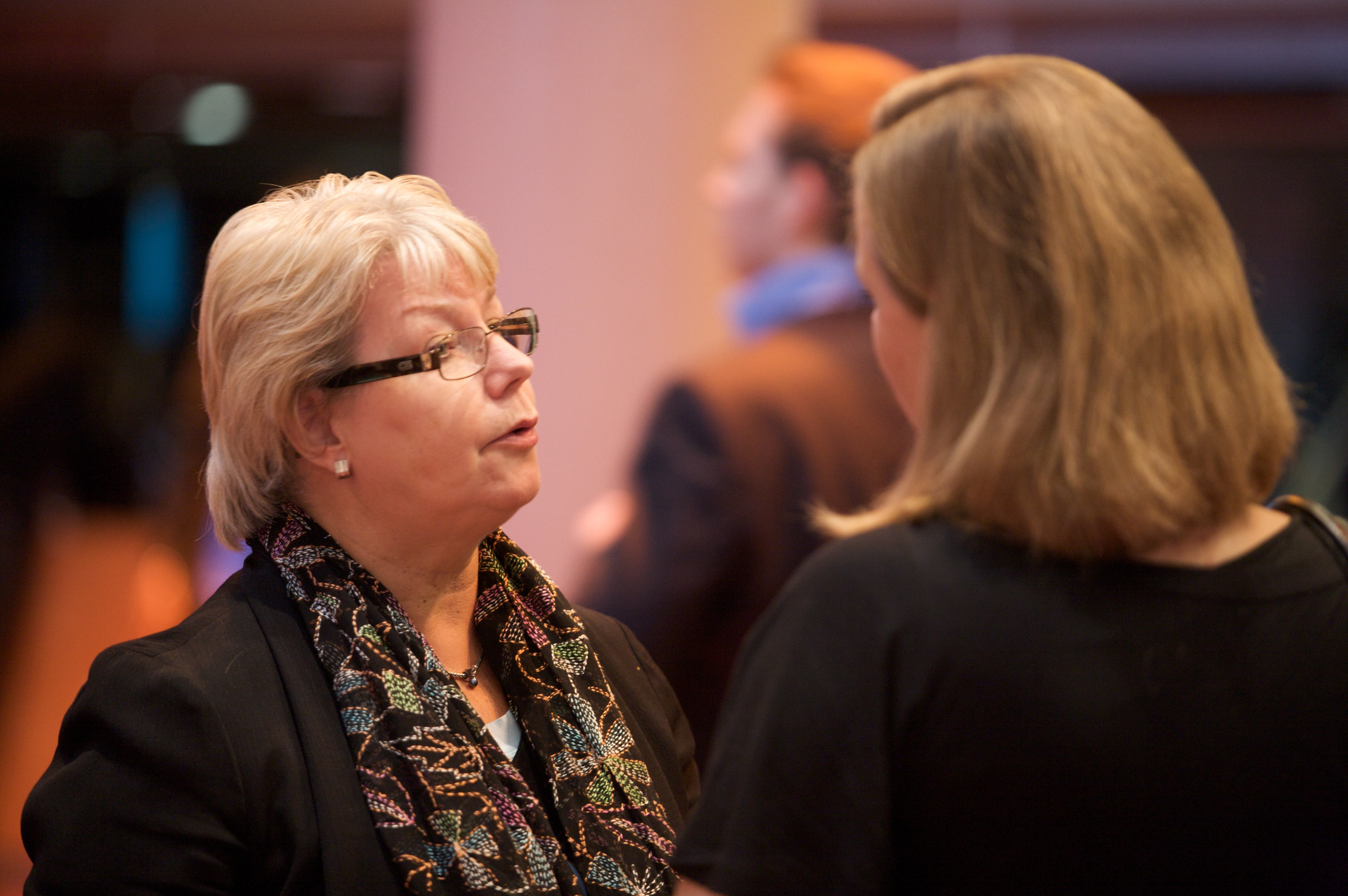
- Magda Berndsen in 2009

Member of the House of Representatives
- In office 17 June 2010 – 1 November 2015

Personal details
- Born: 4 May 1950 (age 76)
- Party: Democrats 66
- Occupation: Politician

Magdalena Adriaantje (Magda) Berndsen-Jansen (born 4 May 1950) is a Dutch former politician and police officer, born in Leiden. As a member of Democrats 66 (D66), she was a member of the House of Representatives of the Netherlands between 17 June 2010 and 1 November 2015. She focused on matters of safety, judiciary and police. Judith Swinkels replaced her.

Berndsen was mayor of Obdam and Beverwijk, and acting mayor of Súdwest-Fryslân and Dongeradeel, and also corps chief of Gooi en Vechtstreek Police and Friesland Police.

== Electoral history ==
Electoral history of Magda Berndsen
Year	Body	Party	Pos.	Votes	Result		Ref.
Year	Body	Party	Pos.	Votes	Party seats	Individual	Ref.
2021	House of Representatives	Democrats 66	73 (Note: Only participated as lijstduwer in the electoral district Leeuwarden.)	47	24	Lost	
