= 1795 in the Netherlands =

Events from the year 1795 in the Batavian Republic

== Events ==
- Batavian Revolution in Amsterdam
- Kew Letters
- Treaty of The Hague (1795)
- Alliance with France (May 1795)
- Dutch East India Company goes bankrupt

== Births ==
- Ary Scheffer (10 Feb 1795, Dordrecht)-Dutch/French Romantic painter
- Willem de Clercq (15 Jan 1795, Amsterdam)-Dutch merchant and man of letters
- Abraham Capadose (22 Aug 1795, Amsterdam)-Dutch physician and missionary

== Deaths ==
- Paul Theodor van Brussel, Painter
- 11 July: Jacob Derk Carel van Heeckeren, Nobleman
- 16 October: Cornelis van Noorde, Painter
