= Willem H. Vanderburg =

Willem H. Vanderburg (born 3 August 1944, The Netherlands), is Professor Emeritus of the Departments of Civil Engineering, Sociology, and the School of Environmental Studies at the University of Toronto. He is the Founding Director of its Centre for Technology and Social Development, past editor-in-Chief of the Bulletin of Science, Technology and Society, past President of the International Association for Science, Technology and Society. In 2002 he was honoured by the Canada Foundation for Innovation as one of the 25 leading Canadian innovators. He is also a Fellow of the Canadian Academy of Engineering. Vanderburg is the author of 13 books dealing with human life in our civilization.

== Publications ==
=== Academic Books ===
- Vanderburg, Willem H. Rescuing Humanity: Transcending the Limits of Mathematics, Science, and Technology University of Toronto Press, 2023
