= René Stoute =

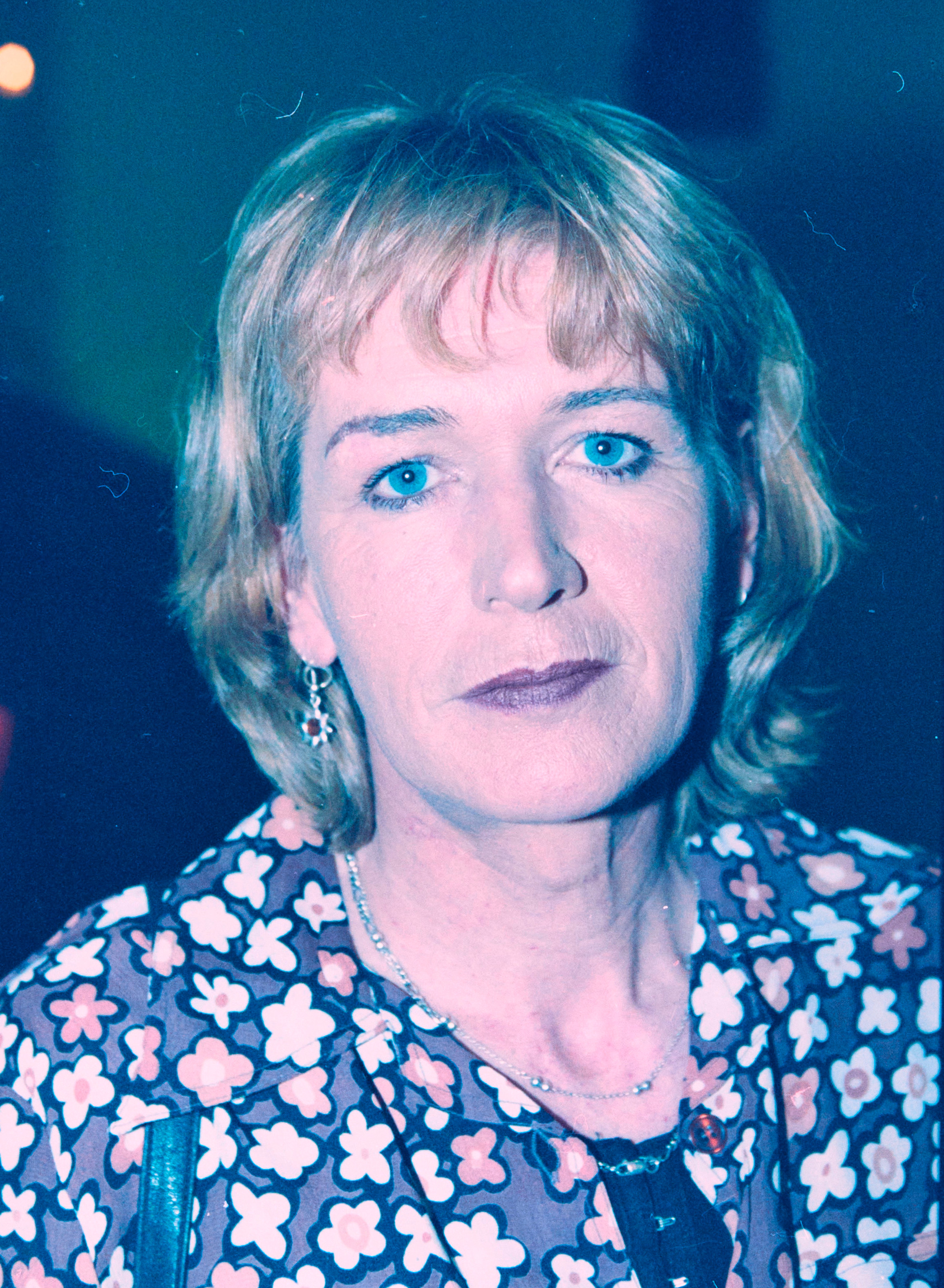
- René Stoute in 1998
- Born: 26 October 1950; Haarlem
- Died: 19 March 2000 (aged 49); Eindhoven
- Occupation: writer

Renate (René) Stoute (26 October 1950 – 19 March 2000) was a Dutch writer and poet. In 1995, Stoute underwent hormone treatment, which was followed in December 1996 by a sex-change operation. From 1994 she called herself Renée, but after the operation she went through life as Renate Stoute.

== Biography ==
René Stoute was born in 1950 into a family from the lower middle class of Haarlem to a hotel worker father worked in a hotel and housewife mother. Stoute made his debut as a novelist in 1982 with the book Op de rug vanvuile zwanen (On the back of dirty swans), which was inspired by his life as a drug addict, which lasted until he was 27. In 1980, he published a collection of poems; Wolkbreuk boven het Gardameer (Cloudbreak above Lake Garda). In addition to drug use, themes such as transsexuality and transvestism became increasingly important in Stoute's work, as evidenced by the books Het grimmig genieten (1991) and Een goede transvestiet zie je niet. Gesprekken met transvestieten, vrouwen en kinderen (1994). In 1999, the collection Uit een oude jas vol stenen (From an old coat full of stones) was published, an autobiographical novel in which Stoute tries to explain why she felt like a woman and had fled her life for it in, among other things, drink and drugs. At the age of forty-six, Stoute underwent gender reassignment surgery in 1996 and legally became a woman. A collection of short stories and poems was published posthumously, entitled This Promises to Become a Night (2005).

Stoute had two daughters from a previous marriage. In 1998 she entered into a registered partnership with her eventual wife. In March 2000 she died suddenly of liver cancer. Her last performance had been less than a month earlier at the Balie in Amsterdam where she had recited a short story. This story is also included in "Dit belooft een nacht te worden".

== Bibliography ==
- Wolkbreuk boven het Gardameer (gedichten – 1980)
- Op de rug van vuile zwanen (verhalen – 1982)
- Een fatsoenlijke betrekking (roman – 1984)
- Notities van de messenwerper (gedichten – 1984)
- Uit het achterland (roman – 1985)
- Bunkers bouwen (verhalen – 1986)
- De kale tijd (gedichten – 1987)
- Jagers zijn wij, en ook prooi (verhalen – 1987)
- Bewijs van ontslag (verhalen – 1989)
- Het grimmig genieten (roman – 1991)
- Een goeie travestiet zie je niet (interviews – 1994)
- Waarom ik geen bloemenmeisje werd (autobiografie – 1998)
- Uit een oude jas vol stenen (autobiografie – 1999)
- Dit belooft een nacht te worden (verhalen – 2005)
- Wars van alle bullshit (dagboek en brieven – 2015)
