= Flore Zoé =

Dutch photographer (born 1975)

Flore Zoé van den Wijngaart (born 1975) is a fine art and fashion photographer from the Netherlands.

Her series Art meets Fashion was shown during Vitrine 2010, an initiative of the Flanders Fashion Institute. Since April 2012 a selection of Zoé's works are being exhibited at the Opera Gallery Paris and Monaco.

She was born in Delft.
