= René de Boer =

Dutch sculptor

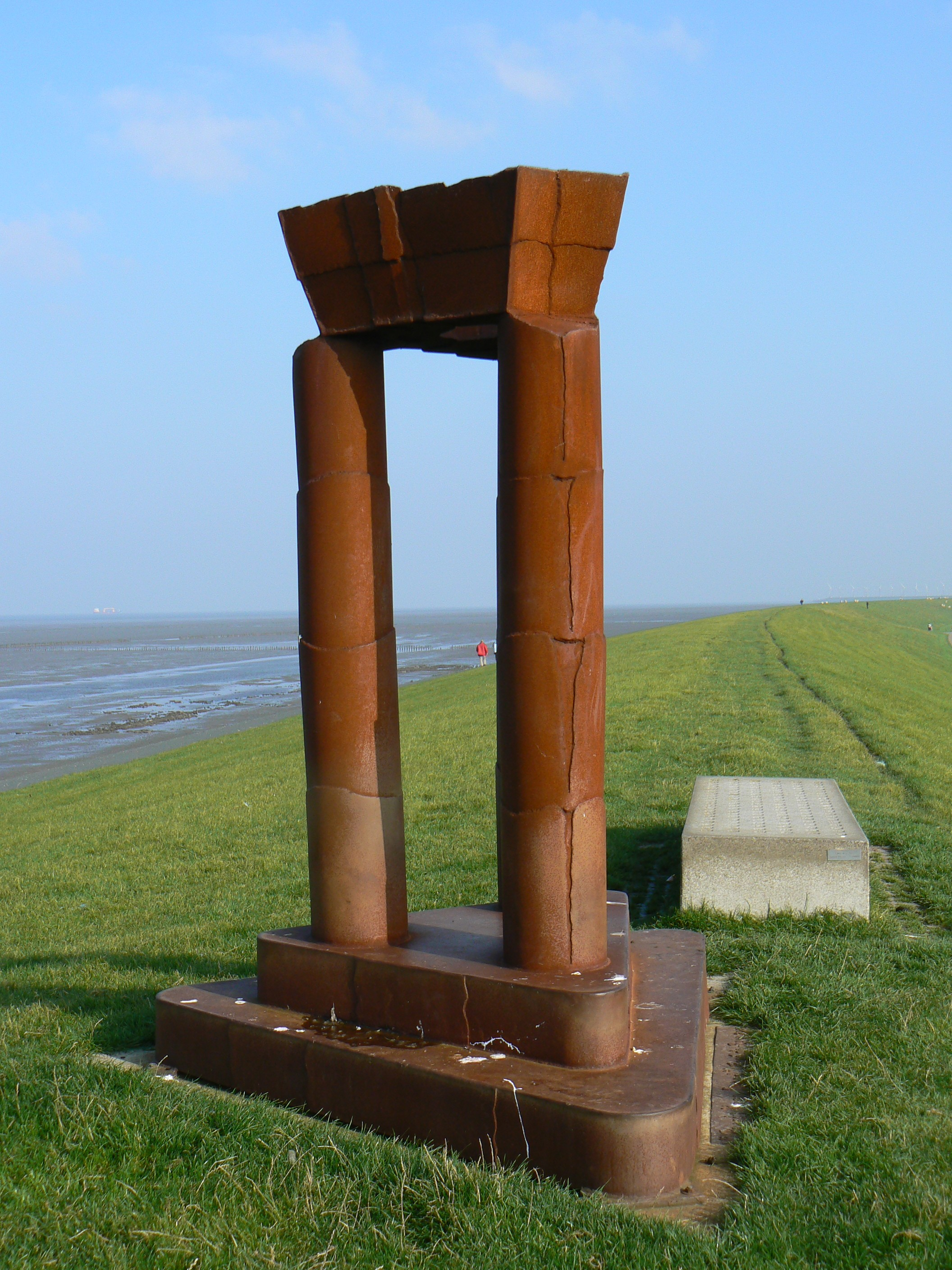
Poort Kaap Noord (2002). Uithuizermeeden, Netherlands.

René de Boer (born 14 March 1945 in Groningen) is a Dutch sculptor, perhaps best known for his work as a spatial designer.

== Life and work ==
The Groningen visual artist De Boer studied sculpture at the Minerva Academy in Groningen from 1963 to 1967. He is based in Usquert as a spatial designer. In his sculptures he initially made use of the materials stone, bronze and brass, later mainly of Corten steel.

In 1980 De Boer took part in the Groningen Monumental exhibition in the Rosarium in Winschoten with three of his works.

René de Boer is married to Colette Jesse.
