= Lion van Minden =

Dutch fencer (1880–1944)

Personal information
- Born: 10 June 1880 Amsterdam, Netherlands
- Died: 6 September 1944 (aged 64) Auschwitz-Birkenau, German-occupied Poland

Sport
- Sport: Fencing
- Event: epee
- Club: Koninklijke Officiers Schermbond (Den Haag)

Lion van Minden (10 June 1880 – 6 September 1944) was a Dutch Olympic epee fencer, who was killed in the Auschwitz concentration camp.

== Early life ==
Van Minden was born in Amsterdam, Netherlands, and was Jewish. He was the son of Abraham Lion van Minden (1850-1915) and Branca Ziekenoppasser (1855-1943), and the husband of Esther Mina Schlossberg (1893-1945).

== Fencing career ==
His fencing club was Koninklijke Officiers Schermbond, in Den Haag.

Van Minden competed in saber in the 1908 Summer Olympics in London, England, at 27 years of age. He won two bouts, and lost three.

== Killing ==
Van Minden was killed in the Auschwitz concentration camp in 1944.
