= Harry Dijksma =

Dutch politician (born 1951)

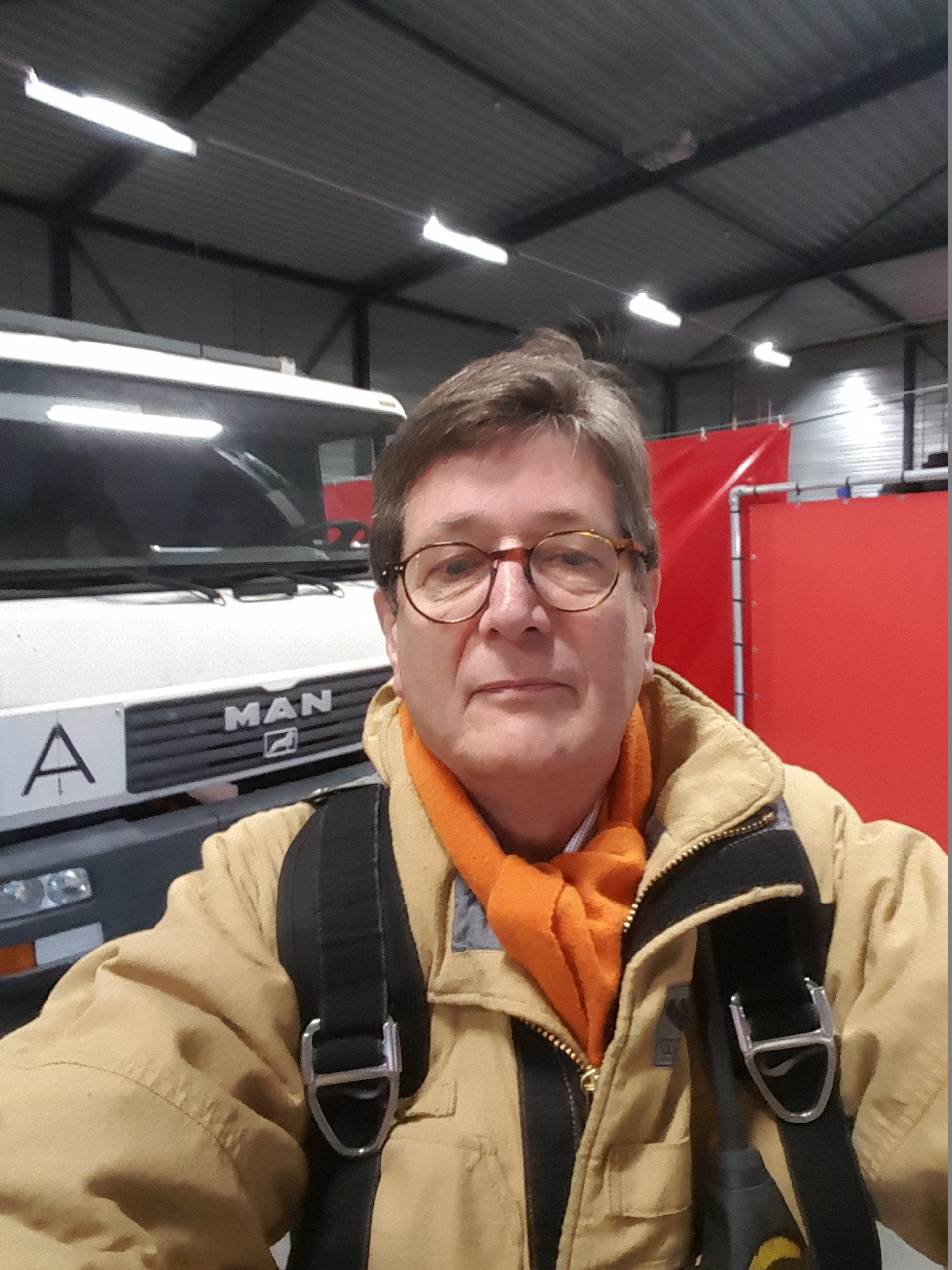
Harry Dijksma

Harry Dijksma (born March 12, 1951) is a Dutch politician of the People's Party for Freedom and Democracy (VVD). He is a Representative of Flevoland for the States Deputed.
