= 1747 in the Netherlands =

Events from the year 1747 in the Dutch Republic

== Events ==
- May - The States of Utrecht readopted the Government Regulations from 1675
- 2 July – The Battle of Lauffeld, at which the Dutch and her allies were defeated by the French under Maurice de Saxe
- July – Ulrich Frédéric Woldemar, Comte de Lowendal initiates the Siege of Bergen op Zoom
- 22 July – William IV, Prince of Orange, Stadtholder of Friesland and Groningen, is confirmed as Stadtholder of the United Provinces
- 18 September – French forces breach the defenses of Bergen op Zoom, defeat the defenders and sack the town
- 22 November 1747 – The Office of Stadtholder of the United Provinces is made hereditary

== Births ==
- 7 May – Judith van Dorth, aristocrat (executed 1799)
- 17 May – Johannes van der Kemp, military officer, doctor, philosopher and missionary (died 1811)

== Deaths ==
- 26 January – Willem van Mieris, painter (born 1662)
- 9 March – Jacob Campo Weyerman, painter and writer (born 1677)
- 17 July – Jacques Ignatius de Roore, painter and art collector (born 1686)
