= Frits Jan Willem den Ouden =

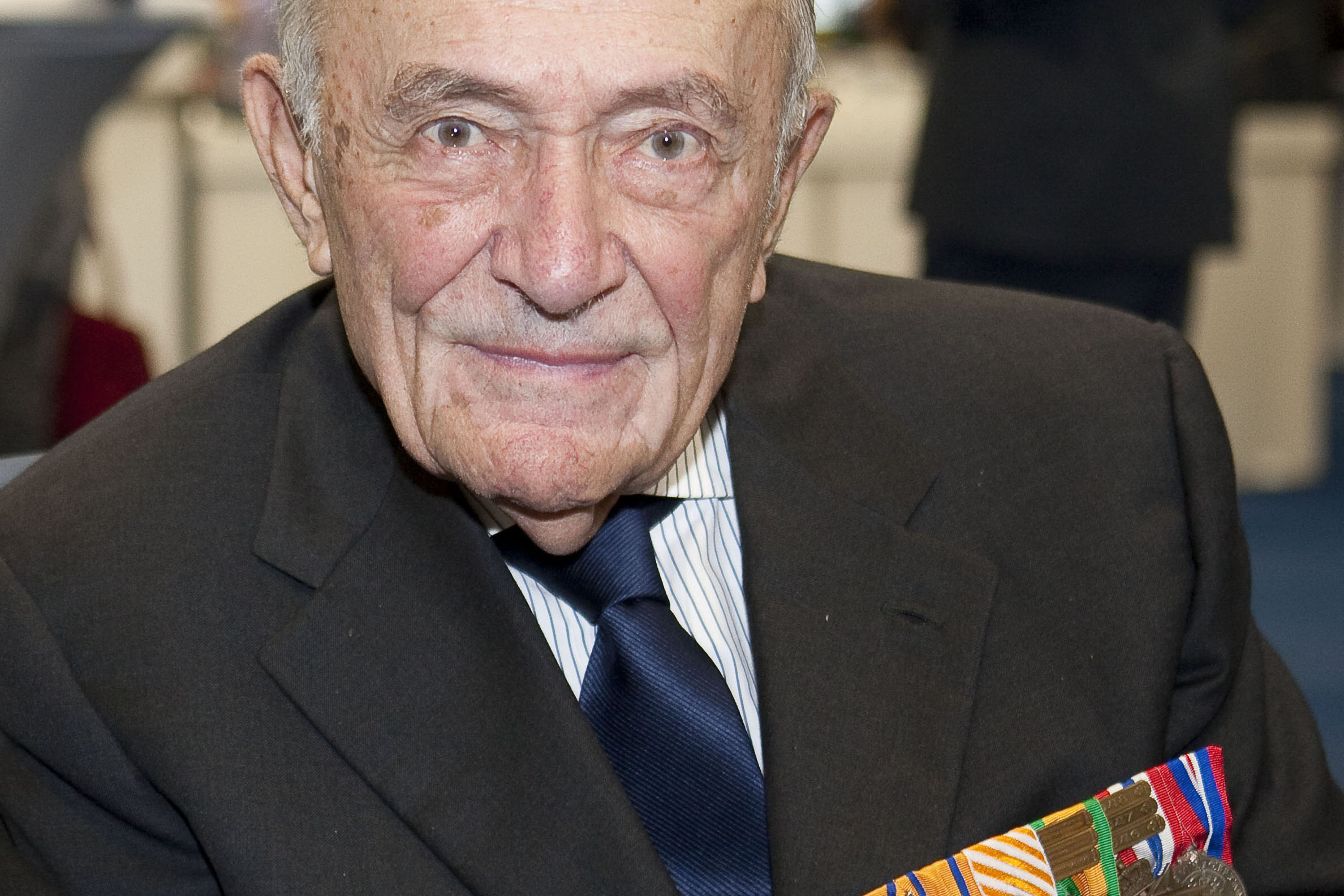
- Frits in 2012
- Born: July 23, 1914; The Hague, Netherlands
- Died: July 31, 2012 (aged 98); Breda, Netherlands
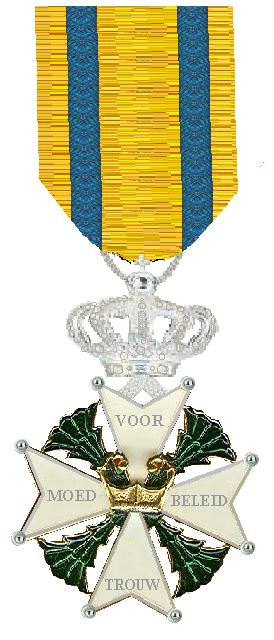
- Awards: Military William Order
- Aviation career
- Air force: Royal Netherlands East Indies Army Air Force
- Battles: World War II
- Rank: Captain

Frits Jan Willem den Ouden (July 23, 1914 – July 31, 2012) was a Dutch bomber pilot during World War II. He flew missions for the Royal Netherlands East Indies Army Air Force from 1936 to 1950, working his way up to the rank of captain.

== Early life ==
den Ouden was born in The Hague, Netherlands on July 23, 1914. At the age of five his parents divorced, he lived with his father who was an officer in the Aceh War. den Ouden's father died when he was 16. During the Great Depression in the Netherlands when education costs were low he began training at the Koninklijke Militaire Academie in Breda. After his study at the KMA on August 2, 1936, he was appointed as a second lieutenant of artillery at the Royal Dutch Air Force, he was stationed in Surabaya.

== War War II ==
In 1939 he was placed within the 1st Royal Air Force Division at Husein Sastranegara International Airport (then called Andir Airport) in Indonesia. He was stationed there until the outbreak of the war against Japan. He was sent to Samarinda with his unit, from Samarinda International Airport den Ouden was part of multiple bombing attacks with Glenn Martin bombers on enemy targets.

For his commitment during these bombing missions he was awarded the Airman's Cross or Vliegerkruis by the Government Decree. He was later awarded the Military William Order for his contributions during the Battle of Makassar Strait on February 12, 1942. On March 6, 1942, he was relocated to Adelaide where he was stationed a short time. He was then moved from Australia to the United States. In the U.S. he was assigned to the Royal Netherlands Military Flying School in Jackson, Mississippi (RNMFS). After removal of the RNMFS he returned to Australia to join the No. 18 (Netherlands East Indies) Squadron RAAF, for which he flew many missions in and around Australia and the United States on the B-25 Mitchell. On August 11, 1949, he returned to the Netherlands where he continued to fly into his 70s.

== Post-war career ==
den Ouden retired from the military in 1950. For years den Ouden worked as a director of WJ Stokvis Royal Metalworks Factory, and in 1970 he founded a shipyard called De Amer which produced about 100 boats a year. Mainly patrol boats selling them to countries in Europe, United Arab Emirates, United States, Canada and Asian countries like Singapore and Hong Kong.

== Death ==
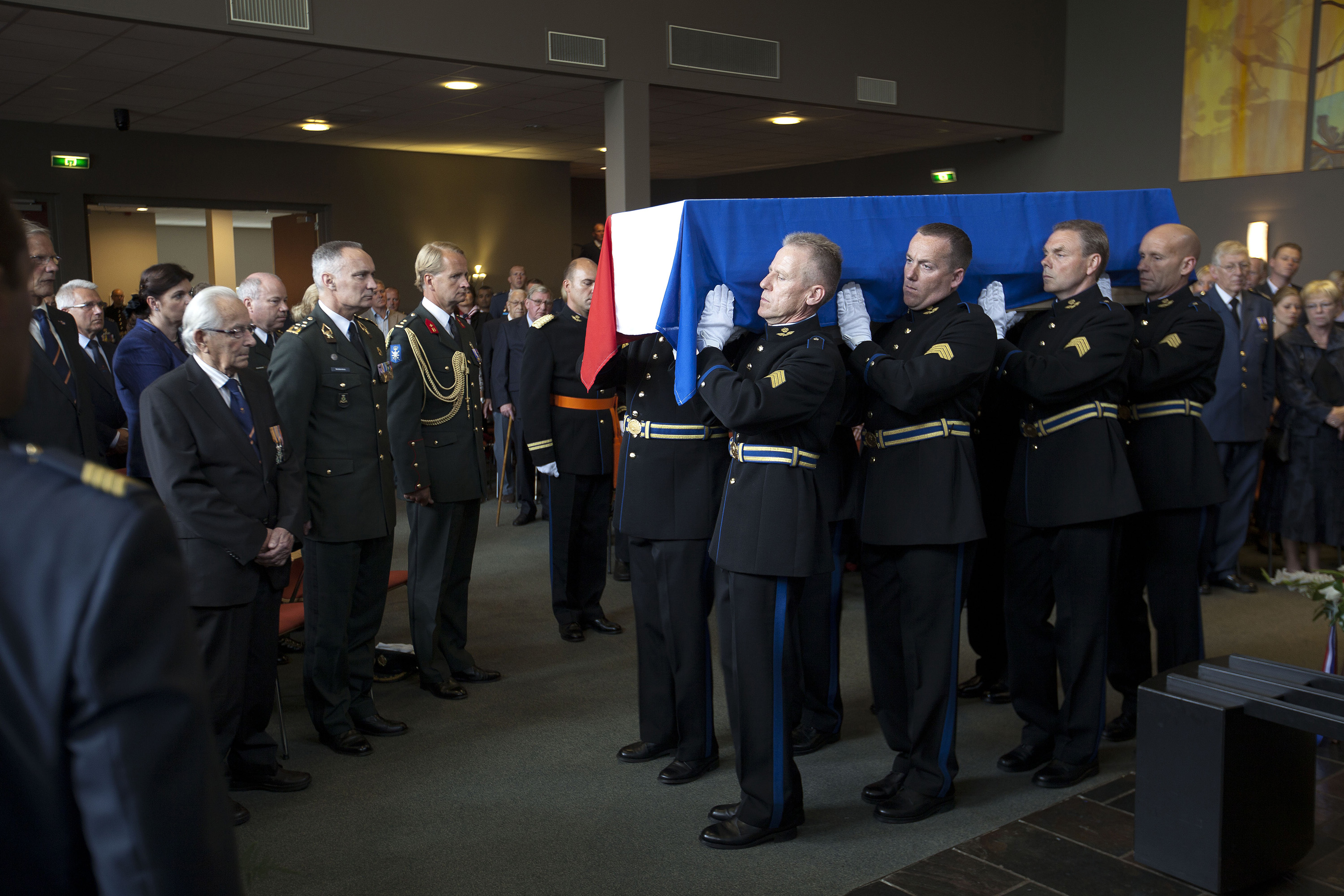
Frits Jan Willem den Ouden funeral

den Ouden died eight days after his 98th birthday on July 31, 2012. He was cremated with full military honors on August 8, 2012. During his funeral four Dutch military aircraft performed a missing man formation during the funeral.
