= 1785 in the Netherlands =

Events from the year 1785 in the Dutch Republic

== Events ==
- - Treaty of Fontainebleau (1785)
