= AGS (motorcycle manufacturer) =

1970s Dutch motorcycle manufacturer

AGS was a motocross bicycle manufacturer in the 1970s, featuring 50cc and 123cc engines by Sachs, Puch and Zundapp.
