= Paul Schellekens =

Paulus Wilhelmus Adrianus (Paul) Schellekens (born 1951) is a civil servant and diplomat in the Netherlands.

Schellekens began his career as assistant legal advisor at the Ministry of Foreign Affairs (Netherlands). From 1994 to 1998 he was the consul general in Toronto, Canada. From 1998 to 2002, Schellekens was head of the political department and minister plenipotentiary to the Netherlands embassy in Beijing, China, and from 2002 to 2006 he served as the Netherlands ambassador to Peru.

Schellekens became director of the Queen's Office on 1 September 2006. He was preceded by Felix Rhodius.

On 27 January 2012, it was announced that Paul Schellekens was appointed to the post of Netherlands ambassador to Dublin in Ireland. He took up this position in the summer of 2012. Schellekens was succeeded by drs. Chris Breedveld, the former deputy director-general of the Netherlands Government Information Service.

He is married to Maureen van Rijk.
