= 1789 in the Netherlands =

- Decades
- See also: Other events of 1789 · History of the Netherlands

Events from the year 1789 in the Dutch Republic

== Events ==
- French Revolution, starting with the Storming of the Bastille in July, gave new hope to the many Dutch Patriots who had fled into exile in France and the Austrian Netherlands (modern Belgium) after their defeat in 1787.
- In the adjacent Austrian Netherlands (the southern Low Countries), the Brabant Revolution erupted in late October 1789. This was a revolt against the centralizing reforms of the Holy Roman Emperor Joseph II, who had abrogated the region's ancient charters. The revolutionaries, a mix of conservative "Statists" and progressive "Vonckists," invaded from the Dutch Republic, defeated Austrian forces at the Battle of Turnhout on October 27, and subsequently expelled the Austrians from most of the territory, eventually proclaiming the short-lived United Belgian States in early 1790.
- In August 1789, the Prince-Bishopric of Liège also experienced a bloodless coup, the "Happy Revolution," where the local populace overthrew the Prince-Bishop in demands for democratic reforms.
- Villa Welgelegen

== Births ==
- October 23 - Jean Chrétien Baud, governor general of the Dutch East Indies

== Deaths ==
- January 10 - Pierre Lyonet, artist and engraver
- April 7 - Petrus Camper, physician, anatomist, and palaeontologist among others
- October 19 - Lucretia Wilhelmina van Merken, poet and playwright
