= 1976 in the Netherlands =

This article lists some of the events from 1976 related to the Netherlands.

== Incumbents ==
- Monarch: Juliana (1948—1980)
- Prime Minister: Joop den Uyl (1973–1977)

== Events ==
- 3 April – Eurovision Song Contest, held in The Hague

== Births ==
- 1 April – Clarence Seedorf, footballer
- 14 April – Henriëtte van Aalderen, tennis player
- 1 July – Patrick Kluivert, footballer
- 16 September – Fleur Agema, politician
