= 1993 in the Netherlands =

- Decades: 1970s; 1980s; 1990s; 2000s; 2010s
- See also: Other events of 1993; History of the Netherlands

Events in the year 1993 in the Netherlands.

== Incumbents ==
- Monarch: Beatrix
- Prime Minister: Ruud Lubbers

== Events ==
- 29 May – The Hague Adoption Convention is drafted.
- 22 July to 2 August – The 1993 World Games were held in The Hague.

== Births ==
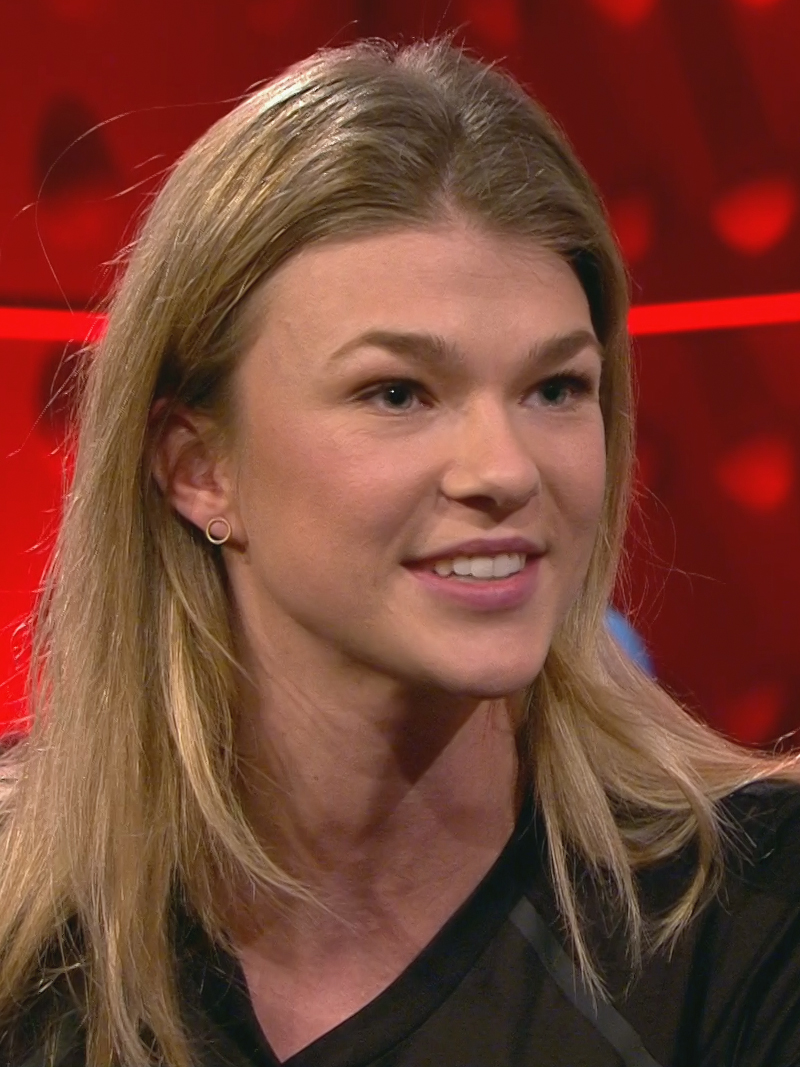
Tess Wester

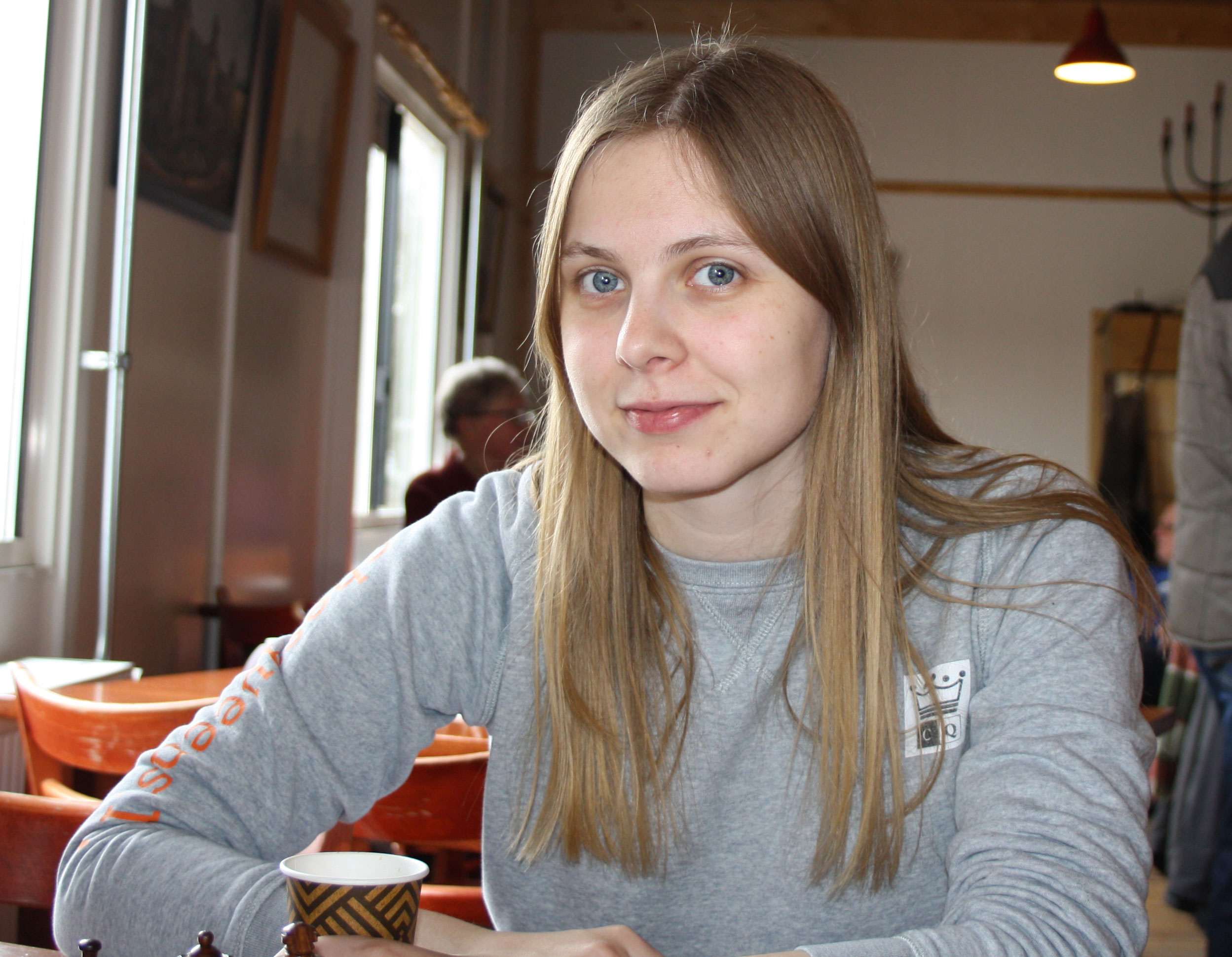
Anne Haast

- 12 January – Jeroen Meijers, cyclist.
- 18 January – Benito van de Pas, darts player
- 31 January – Angela Malestein, handball player.
- 27 February – Lucas Jussen, pianist
- 5 March – Bregje Heinen, model
- 10 March – Marieke Wijen-Nass, politician
- 14 March – Denza, music producer
- 6 May – Wesley Vissers, bodybuilder
- 7 May – Stefano Denswil, footballer
- 15 May – Olaf Schaftenaar, basketball player
- 19 May – Tess Wester, handball player.
- 29 May – Wessel Keemink, volleyball player
- 8 June – Enzo Knol, video blogger
- 15 June – Elisa Piek, badminton player
- 1 July – Joey Dale, DJ, record producer and musician
- 1 July – Anne Haast, chess player.
- 5 July – Brian Kamstra, cyclist.
- 17 July – Luc Stultiens, politician
- 20 July – Adam Maher, footballer
- 1 August – Sam Feldt, DJ, record producer and entrepreneur
- 29 October – Lijpe, rapper
- 4 December – Taco van der Hoorn, cyclist.

== Deaths ==
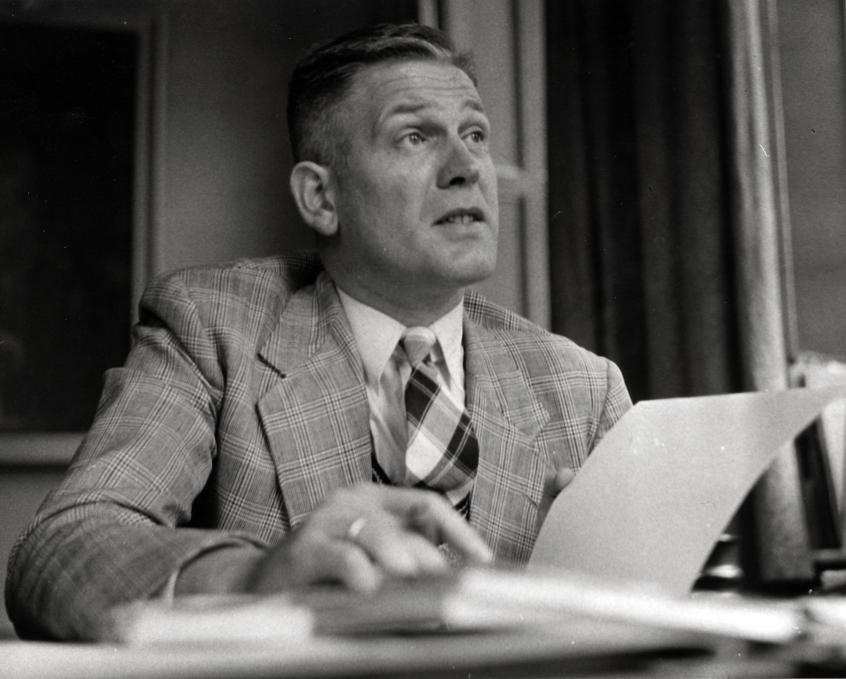
Sybren van Tuinen

- 8 January – Theo Bruins, pianist and composer (b. 1929)
- 26 January – Jan Gies, member of the Dutch resistance (b. 1905)
- 2 February – Pierre Schunck, member of the Dutch resistance (b. 1906).
- 3 February – Greetje Donker, dancer (b. 1906)
- 8 February – Bram van der Stok, World War II fighter pilot and flying ace (b. 1915)
- 22 April – Bertus Aafjes, poet (b. 1914)
- 25 May – Flip Regout, rower (b. 1915).
- 26 June – Willy van Hemert, actor and theatre and television director, and songwriter (b. 1912)
- 18 July – Jan van Druten, painter, sculptor and ceramist (b. 1916)
- 5 September – René Klijn, singer and model (b. 1962)
- 22 October – Elie Aron Cohen, physician (b. 1909)

=== Full date missing ===
- Arie Andries Kruithof, physicist (b. 1909)
- Sybren van Tuinen, politician and public servant (b. 1913)
