= 1996 in the Netherlands =

- Decades: 1970s; 1980s; 1990s; 2000s; 2010s
- See also: Other events of 1996; History of the Netherlands

Events in the year 1996 in the Netherlands.

== Incumbents ==
- Monarch: Beatrix
- Prime Minister: Wim Kok

== Events ==
- 15 July – The 1996 Belgian Air Force Hercules accident at Eindhoven Airport resulted in the death of 34 passengers.
- 19 October – The Hague Convention on Parental Responsibility and Protection of Children was signed.

== Births ==
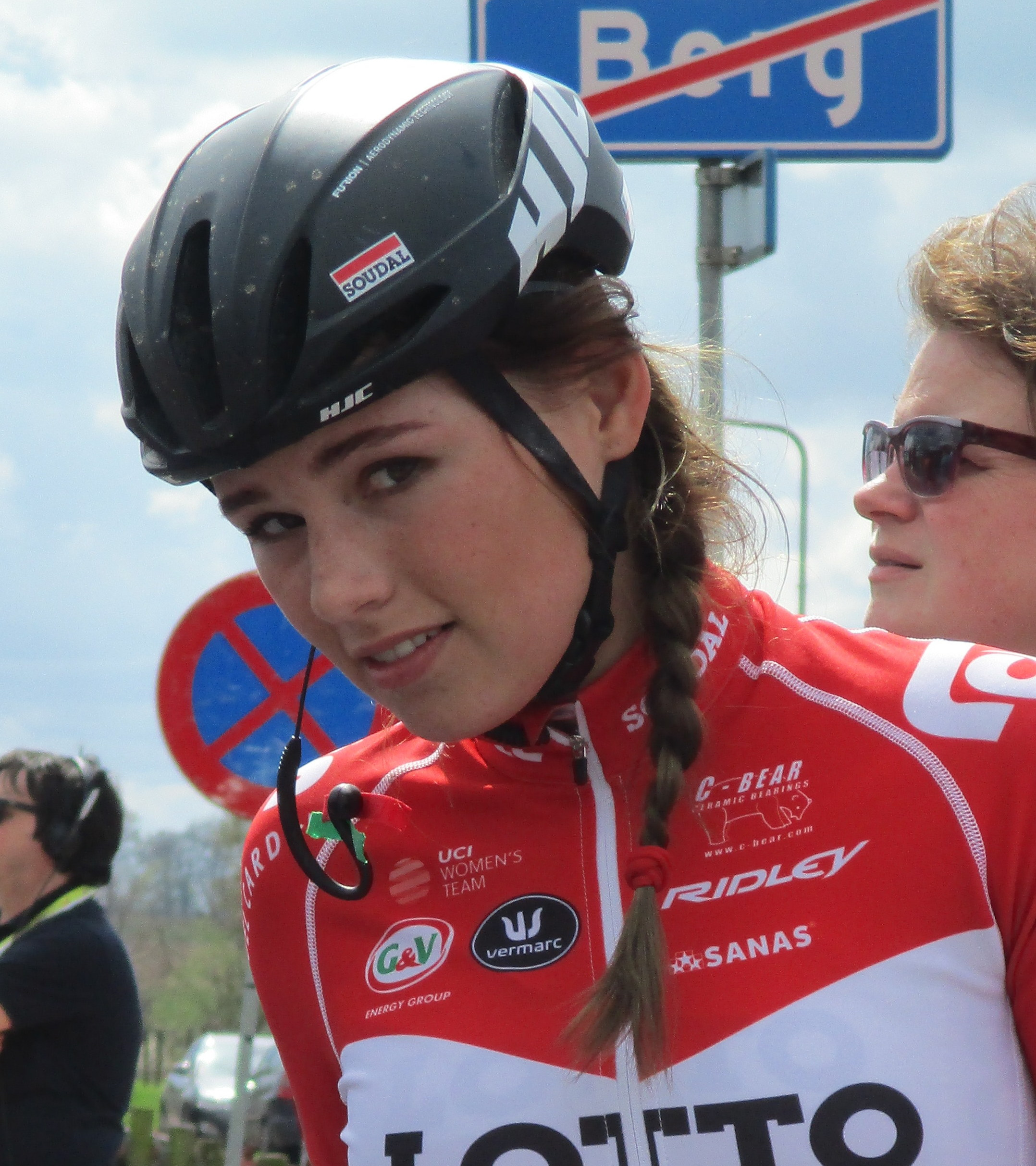
Puck Moonen

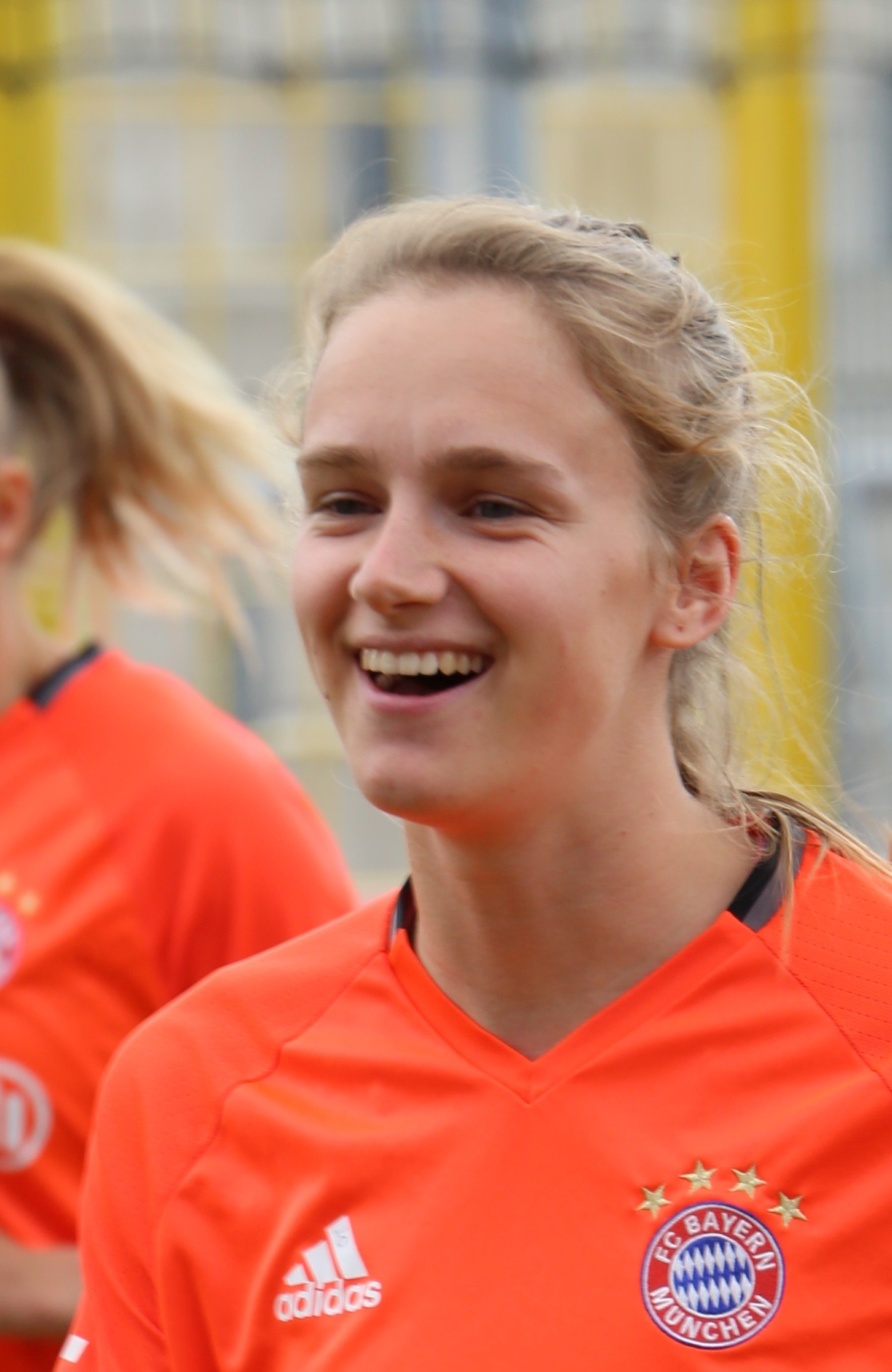
Vivianne Miedema

- 3 January – Rianne van Rompaey, fashion model
- 11 February – Joris Nieuwenhuis, cyclist.
- 28 February – Marrit Jasper, volleyball player
- 20 March – Puck Moonen, cyclist.
- 25 March – Marloes Frieswijk, korfball player
- 12 April – Jip van den Bos, racing cyclist.
- 13 April – Birgit Kos, fashion model
- 25 April – Will Grands, record producer, singer and songwriter
- 14 May – Martin Garrix, DJ and record producer
- 24 June – Thomas Ouwejan, footballer
- 15 July – Vivianne Miedema, footballer
- 23 August – Berry van Peer, darts player
- 28 August – Sam van Dijk, basketball player
- 31 August – Fabio Jakobsen, cyclist.
- 3 September – Eva Vlaardingerbroek, political commentator, activist
- 9 September – Jaïro Riedewald, footballer
- 22 September – Jimme Nordkamp, politician
- 28 September – Arthur Jussen, pianist
- 5 October – Sevn Alias, rapper
- 5 October – Imaan Hammam, model
- 23 October – Julius van den Berg, cyclist.
- 26 October – Emma Wortelboer, television presenter
- 27 November – Mike Williams, DJ, record producer, musician and remixer

== Deaths ==
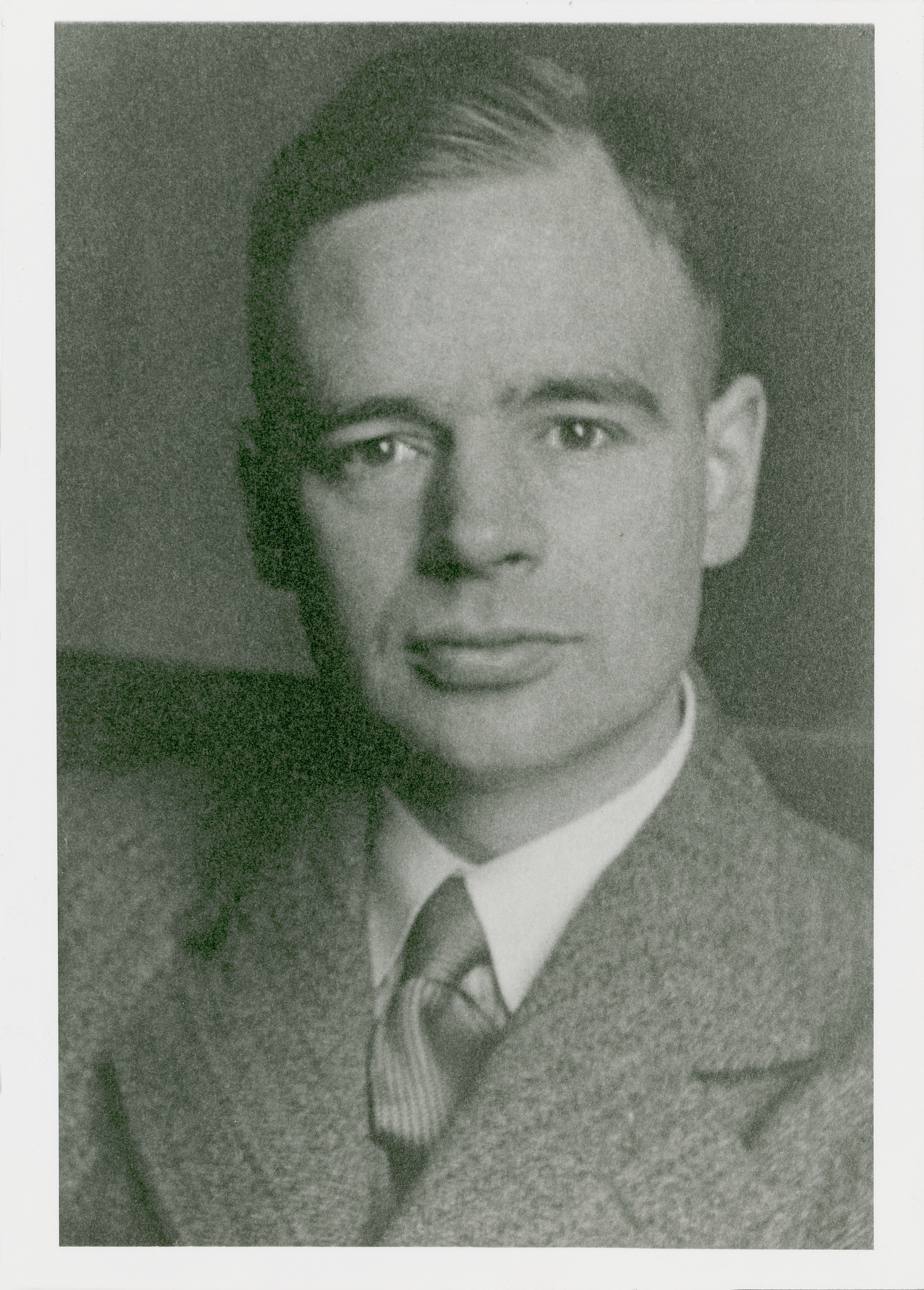
Bartel Leendert van der Waerden

- 5 January – Thung Sin Nio, women's rights activist, physician, economist and politician (b. 1902)
- 12 January – Bartel Leendert van der Waerden, mathematician (b. 1903)
- 4 February – John Hugo Loudon, business executive (b. 1905)
- 14 February – Gied Jaspars, television maker (b. 1939)
- 24 February – Piet Derksen, businessman (b. 1913)
- 27 February – Gerrit Berkhoff, chemist (b. 1901)
- 31 May – Ton de Leeuw, composer (b. 1926)
- 5 July – Piet Stam, swimmer (b. 1919).
- 11 July – Florrie Rodrigo, dancer, choreographer, and educator (b. 1893)
- 19 August – Jurriaan Andriessen, composer (b. 1925)
- 21 September – Henri Nouwen, Catholic priest, professor, writer and theologian (b. 1932)
- 24 September – Jannes van der Wal, draughts player (b. 1956)
- 2 October – Emiel van Lennep, official (treasurer general), diplomat and Minister of State (b. 1915)
- 3 October – Bertus Enklaar, chess player (b. 1943)
- 23 October – Bernardus Weber, sculptor, draughtsman, and pastellist (b. 1912)
- 4 December – Albert Winsemius, economist (b. 1910)

=== Full date missing ===
- Hilbrand J. Groenewold, theoretical physicist, pioneer of the phase-space formulation of quantum mechanics (b. 1910)
