= Marloes (disambiguation) =

Marloes is a village in Pembrokeshire, Wales.

Marloes may also refer to:

== Places ==
- Marloes Sands, a remote sandy beach in Pembrokeshire, Wales, near the village of Marloes
- Marloes Mere, a lake near Marloes

== People ==
Marloes is a Dutch feminine given name.

- Marloes Braat (born 1990), Dutch cricket player
- Marloes Coenen (born 1982), Dutch mixed martial artist
- Marloes de Boer (born 1982), Dutch football defender
- Marloes Fellinger (born 1982), Dutch softball player
- Marloes Frieswijk (born 1996), Dutch Korfball player
- Marloes Horst (born 1989), Dutch fashion model
- Marloes Keetels (born 1993), Dutch field hockey player
- Marloes Maathuis (born 1978), Dutch statistician
- Marloes Wesselink (born 1987), Dutch beach volleyball player
- Marloes Wittenberg (born 1983), Dutch judoka

== Other ==
- Marloes and St Brides, a community council in the West Wales county of Pembrokeshire
