= Stultiens =

Stultiens is a Dutch surname.

== List of people with the name ==
- Joseph Martinus Stultiens (1887–1956), Dutch jeweller
- Luc Stultiens (born 1993), Dutch politician
- Sabrina Stultiens (born 1993), Dutch cyclist

== See also ==
- Sultanate
