= 1998 in the Netherlands =

- Decades: 1970s; 1980s; 1990s; 2000s; 2010s
- See also: Other events of 1998; History of the Netherlands

Events in the year 1998 in the Netherlands.

== Incumbents ==
- Monarch: Beatrix
- Prime Minister: Wim Kok

== Events ==
- 6 May – The 1998 Dutch general election
- 4 to 11 October – The 1998 UCI Road World Championships took place in Valkenburg aan de Geul.
- 18 November – The Dutch Far Right Nationalist party Centre Party '86 was banned by the Amsterdam court, becoming one of the first parties banned in the Netherlands.

== Births ==
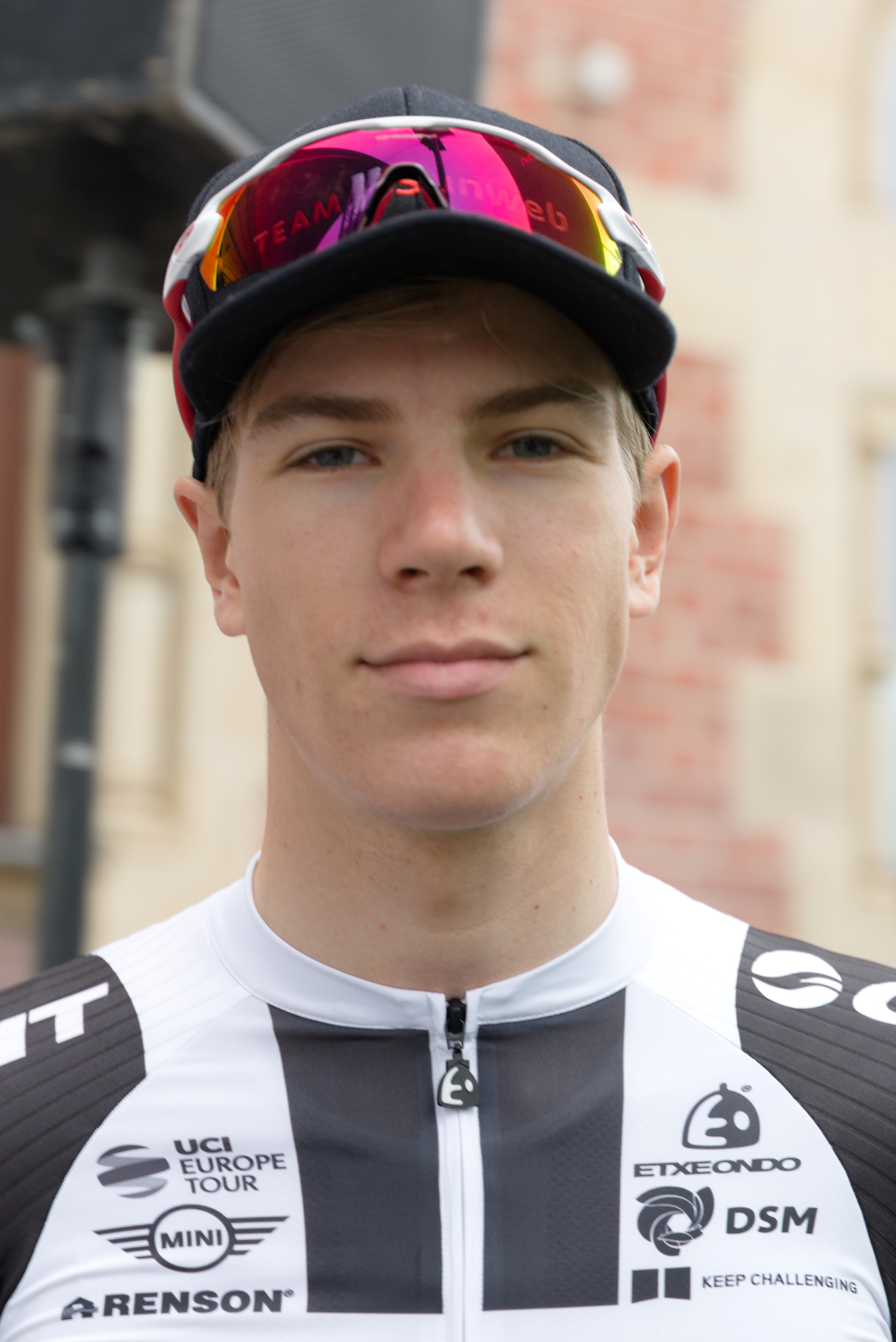
Nils Eekhoff

- 6 January – Merel Freriks, handball player.
- 23 January Nils Eekhoff, cyclist.
- 4 February – Luna Bijl, fashion model
- 6 February – Ide Schelling, cyclist.
- 13 March – Jay-Roy Grot, footballer
- 18 June – Sarah Nauta, singer and actress
- 8 July – Koen Huntelaar, footballer
- 10 July – Yasmin Wijnaldum, fashion model
- 4 September – Geert Nentjes, darts player
- 3 October
  - Pleun Bierbooms, singer
  - Katja Stam, beach volleyball player
- 31 October – Hawijch Elders, violinist
- 2 December – Sophie Francis, record producer
- 9 December – Famke Louise, YouTuber
- 30 December – Jutta Leerdam, speed skater

== Deaths ==
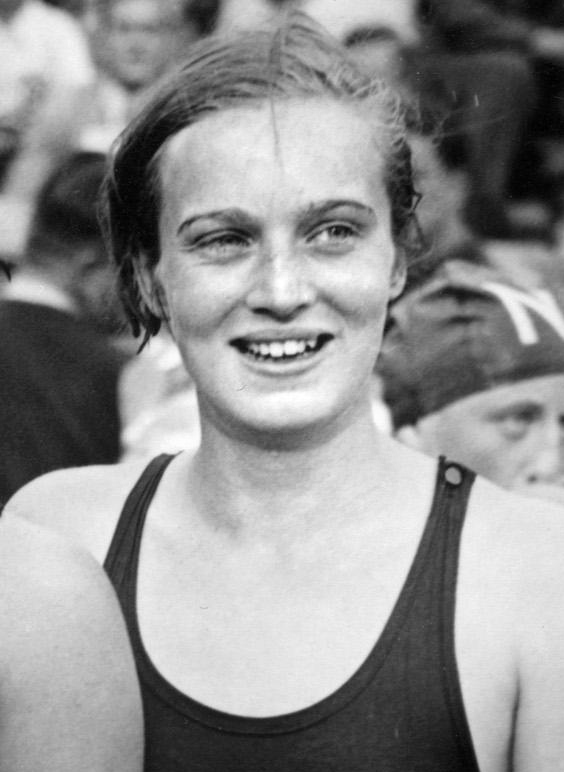
Jopie Selbach

- 1 January – Alfred Lagarde, voice actor (b. 1948)
- 23 January – Violette Cornelius, photographer and resistance fighter (b. 1919)
- 14 February – Gien de Kock, athlete (b. 1908).
- 2 April – Gerrit Jan van Ingen Schenau, biomechanist (b. 1944)
- 22 April – Edward Brongersma, politician (b. 1911)
- 30 April – Jopie Selbach, freestyle swimmer (b. 1918).
- 11 May
  - Willy Corsari, Dutch author of detective fiction (b. 1897).
  - Hans van Zon, serial killer (b. 1941)
- 27 June – Alfred Kossmann, poet (b. 1922)
- 7 October – Cees de Vreugd, butcher, strongman and powerlifter (b. 1952)
- 6 November – Johfra Bosschart, artist (b. 1919)
- 29 November – Maus Gatsonides, rally driver and inventor (b. 1911)
- 13 December – Willem den Toom, politician (b. 1911)
- 24 December – Daan Kagchelland, sailor (b. 1914).

=== Full date missing ===
- Emmy van Deventer, ceramist (b. 1915)
- Aat de Peijper, industrialist and philatelist
- Pi Vèriss, songwriter and composer (b. 1916)
