= Lucas Hoving =

Dutch modern dancer, choreographer and teacher

Lucas Hoving (September 5, 1912 – January 5, 2000) was a modern dancer, choreographer and teacher most famous for the roles he created as an original member of the José Limón Dance Company. Hoving performed opposite Limón in several of the company's best known works, including "The Moor's Pavane" (1949), "The Traitor" (1954), and "Emperor Jones" (1956). He also danced in works by seminal modern dance figures Kurt Jooss, Martha Graham, Agnes De Mille, Doris Humphrey, and Helen Tamiris before forming his own company in 1961.

== Early life ==
Born Lucas Philippus Hovinga in Groningen, the Netherlands, Hoving studied dance with Florrie Rodrigo and Yvonne Georgi in Amsterdam before earning a scholarship to the Jooss School in Dartington, England. Among his roles with the Jooss Ballet was that of the Standard Bearer in the company's "The Green Table." On a tour to New York with the Jooss Company in 1941, he studied at the Martha Graham School. When the Jooss Company disbanded at the onset of World War II, Hoving was invited to join the Graham Company, appearing in Graham's tribute to Emily Dickinson, "Letter to the World", in late 1941.

After appearing on Broadway in 1942 in Catherine Littlefield's "Kiss for Cinderella," Hoving joined the Dutch Armed Forces in exile. He took part in the European campaign as a wireless operator/ interpreter. In 1946 Hoving danced in the Arthur J. Rank film, "London Town" choreographed by Agnes de Mille, who subsequently invited Hoving back to the U.S. to dance in her Broadway production of "Rape of Lucretia." Back in New York, Hoving toured a nightclub act with wife Lavina Nielsen, a native of St. Louis, MO, whom he met at the Jooss School and married in 1943. He and Neilson appeared together in several Broadway productions as well as works by the José Limón Company throughout the 1950s.

== Hoving Partners with Limón ==
Hoving first met José Limón in 1946 in a New York ballet class. Limón invited Hoving to join his newly created company the following year. Blonde, lean, and lyrical in his movement, Hoving made a fitting foil for the dark haired, muscular Limón. But the duet's performance appeal transcended the men's physical dynamic. Dance scholar/ critic Ann Murphy notes:

...these two men expanded the terrain of modern dance by giving unprecedented richness not only to male expression but to men in relationship to one another. They ignored the roles men had so often played in dance as symbols of virility or handsome scenery, and created instead a fictive world of flawed psychological men, passionately and often tragically engaged in the complex drama of living.

According to Murphy, Hoving and Limón's portrayal of men's relationships on the dance stage is credited with laying the groundwork for later male dance collaborations, including that of Bill T. Jones and Arnie Zane in the 1980s.

== Teaching and choreography ==
In 1961 Hoving started his own dance company which toured throughout the U.S., Canada, and Europe. Among the best known works he created for the company is "Icarus," which has been revived by the Alvin Ailey American Dance Theater and the Jooss Company among others. He also choreographed for companies including Bat-Dor of Israel, Kulberg Balletten of Sweden, Grand Ballet Canadiennes of Canada, Ballet Nacional of Mexico, and the Ailey company. In 1971 Hoving was invited by the Dutch government to return to the Netherlands. There he assumed the position of Director of the Rotterdam Dansacademie, and later Supervisor of Dance Education for the Dutch Government.

For the next two decades Hoving traveled around the world conducting teaching residencies and workshops for institutions including Juilliard, Germany's Folkwang Hochschule, Jacob's Pillow Dance Festival, and the American Dance Festival. In 1981 Hoving moved to San Francisco, California, where he formed the Lucas Hoving Performance Group. He started performing again in 1984 with the creation of an autobiographical monologue called "Growing up in Public", conceived and directed by Hoving's longtime friend and colleague Remy Charlip.
