= Bart van Kent =

Dutch politician (born 1983)

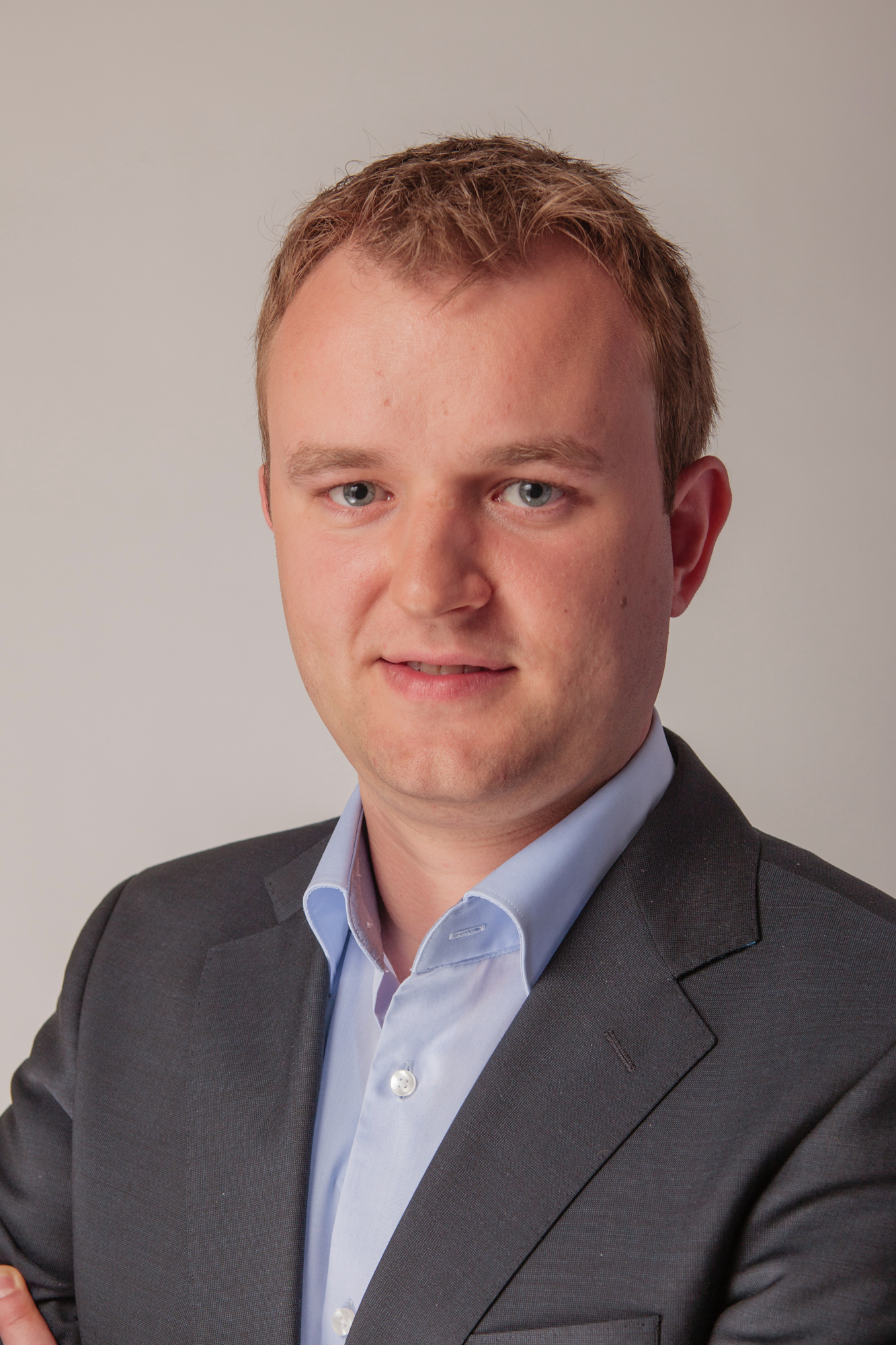
Van Kent in 2012

Bart van Kent (born 18 December 1983) is a Dutch politician of the Socialist Party. Between March 2017 and November 2025, he was a member of the House of Representatives.

== Political career ==
In the 2006 municipal elections, Van Kent was elected to the Eindhoven municipal council. The next year, he resigned to move to The Hague. Between 2010 and 2017, Van Kent was a member of the municipal council of The Hague. Since 2017, he has been a member of the House of Representatives for the Socialist Party. He was re-elected in November 2023, and he has since served as the Socialist Party's spokesperson for labor, income, pensions, traffic, and defense.

When in 2024 an early retirement scheme for workers in physically demanding occupations neared expiration and negotiations about its extension stalled, Van Kent and Luc Stultiens (GL/PvdA) filed an amendment to make the scheme permanent and to raise its maximum benefits. They planned to fund the expansion through canceling a planned broadening of the earnings stripping rule for large corporations. Negotiations facilitated by social affairs minister Eddy van Hijum finally led to an agreement on a permanent scheme in October 2024.

Van Kent did not run for re-election in 2025, and his term ended on 11 November 2025.

== Electoral history ==
Electoral history of Bart van Kent.
Year	Body	Party	Pos.	Votes	Result		Ref.
Year	Body	Party	Pos.	Votes	Party seats	Individual	Ref.
2012	House of Representatives	Socialist Party	38	149	15	Lost	
2017	House of Representatives	Socialist Party	9	957	14	Won	
2021	House of Representatives	Socialist Party	8	599	9	Won	
2023	House of Representatives	Socialist Party	3	1,580	5	Won	
