= Brian Kamstra =

Dutch cyclist (born 1993)

Personal information
- Born: 5 July 1993 (age 33) Assen, Netherlands
- Height: 1.86 m (6 ft 1 in)
- Weight: 69 kg (152 lb)

Cycling career
- Sport: Cycling
- Current team: Retired
- Disciplines: Road; Mountain biking
- Role: Rider
- Rider type: Puncheur

Amateur team
- 2015: Novo Nordisk Development

Professional teams
- 2015: Team Novo Nordisk (stagiaire)
- 2016–2021: Team Novo Nordisk

Brian Kamstra (born 5 July 1993) is a retired Dutch professional cyclist, who raced for UCI ProTeam Team Novo Nordisk. He lives in Rijeka, Croatia.

== Career ==
=== Athletics ===
Kamstra was a 2-times National Champion in cross country running, in 2010 and 2011. He competed at the 2011 European Cross Country Championships in Velenje, Slovenia. He was considered one of the best juniors in the country. Achieving 4 National titles and over 10 National championship medals.

=== Cycling ===
In August 2015, he began racing as a stagiaire with the Team Novo Nordisk professional team. Kamstra started racing bikes in 2015 after being diagnosed with Type 1 Diabetes in 2013.

2016 marked Kamstra's first full season as a professional. His first professional race was the Cadel Evans Great Ocean Road Race in Geelong, finishing 77th overall. A week later he had his best result for the 2016 season with a 15th place in stage 4 of the Herald Sun Tour.

His best result so far is a 10th place at the 2017 Tour de Taiwan. Kamstra competed at the 2017, 2018 and 2021 editions of Milan–San Remo.

=== Retirement ===
In 2021 he announced his retirement of Professional cycling. Despite having a contract for the 2022 season, he was diagnosed with a Myopathy. Kamstra is currently racing as a trail runner and competes across Europe. Having won several events.
