= Hans van Zon =

Dutch serial killer

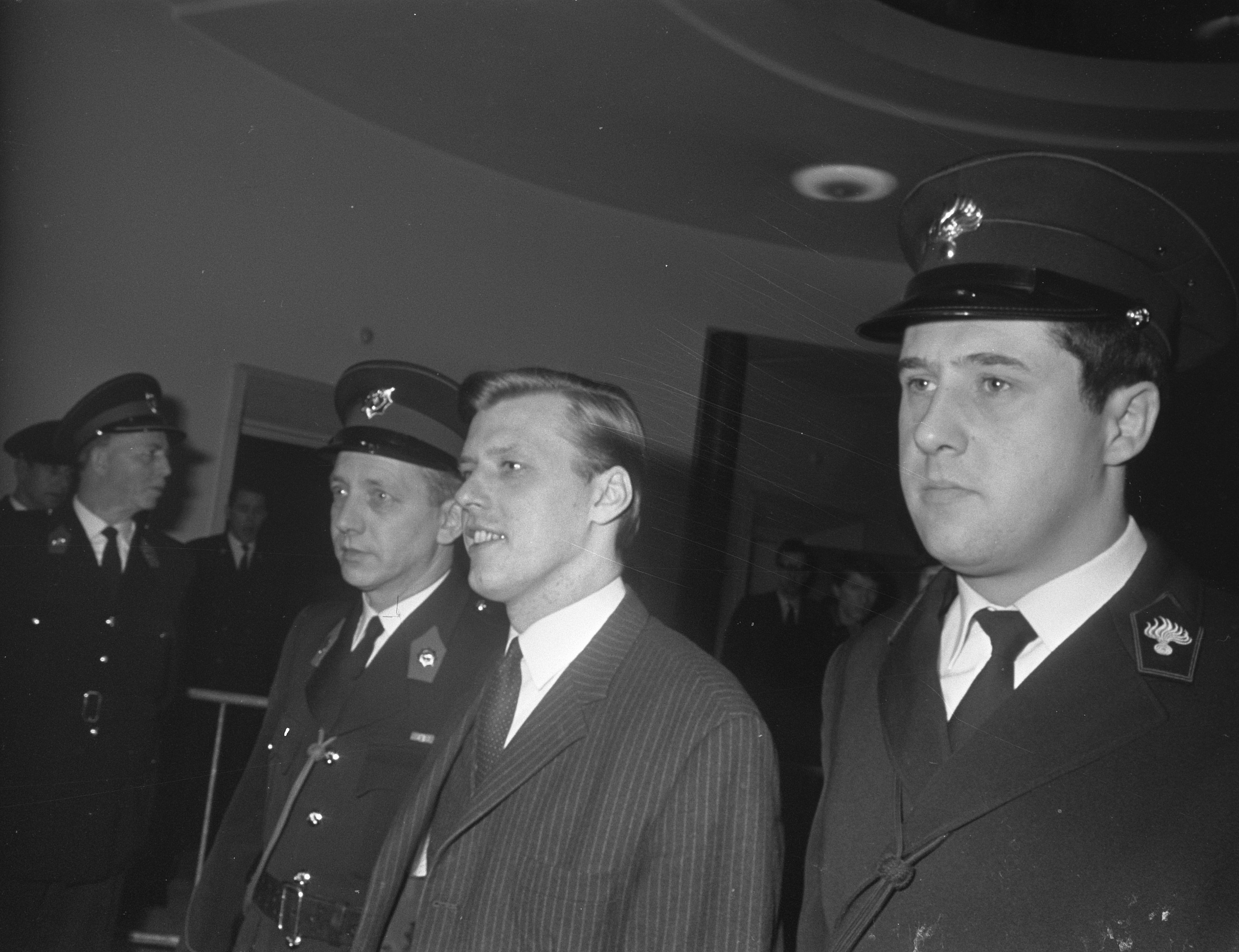
- Van Zon on the way to court
- Born: Johannes Marinus van Zon; 20 April 1942; Utrecht, Utrecht, Netherlands
- Died: 11 May 1998 (aged 56); Delfzijl, Groningen, Netherlands
- Conviction: Murder
- Penalty: Life imprisonment; commuted to 28.5 years' imprisonment

Details
- Victims: 3+
- Span of crimes: April – August 1967
- Country: Netherlands
- State: Utrecht
- Date apprehended: 13 December 1970

Johannes Marinus van Zon (20 April 1942 in Utrecht – 11 May 1998 in Delfzijl) was a Dutch serial killer.

== Character ==
Hans van Zon was known in his surroundings as a neat young man. He was described as intelligent and a charmer, but because of his laziness, he often lacked money to support himself. In 1967, van Zon was looked after by his 47-year-old Italian girlfriend, Caroline Gigli. In the meantime, he also had a relationship with 37-year-old Coby van der Voort.

He earned money by selling pornographic photos of both women. After the relationship between him and van der Voort ended in April 1967, van Zon alleged that she continued to impose on him. To put an end to this, he went into her house on 29 April and killed her with a self-made lead pipe. To deceive the police, he mutilated her corpse so that it would appear like a robbery, and afterwards gave the stolen jewellery to his girlfriend.

== Old Nol ==
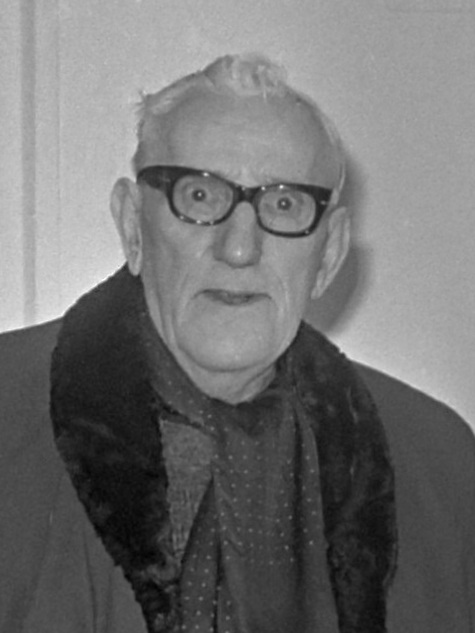
Rietbergen in 1969

Hans van Zon confessed his crime to Arnoldus "Old Nol" Rietbergen, a Utrecht criminal. Whether Rietbergen extorted him or was seen by van Zon as a kind of father figure is not entirely clear. It is clear, however, that Old Nol instructed van Zon to commit two robberies and an attempted robbery. He used a hollow stick with a switchblade attached to the loose button as a weapon.

The victims of the two robberies were Jan "Uncle Cupid" Donse, an 80-year-old shopkeeper in party supplies, and a milkman named Reijer de Bruijn. The loot, consisting of money and jewellery, was in both cases shared with Old Nol. The murders took place on 31 May, and 12 August respectively.

The victim of the attempted robbery was widow, Dora Woortmeijer, a former lover of Old Nol. Van Zon hit her with a lead pipe and left her for dead. She survived the blow however, and identified the perpetrator with the help of photographs. Later it would also become known that a tip had come from the Utrecht underworld. On 13 December 1970, van Zon was arrested. In March 1970, he was sentenced to life imprisonment with great interest from the national and international press.

In addition to the murders he was tried for, van Zon was also suspected of several other murders, including the lust murder of Elly Segov in 1964 and the murder of the English homosexual film director Claude Berkeley in 1965.

== Captivity ==
While he was in the observation clinic in Utrecht, van Zon began a relationship with therapist and social worker, Riet van der Brink, whom he married in 1974. Van Zon lived a luxurious life in prison compared to other prisoners. The minister of justice, Dries van Agt, asked for clarification from a member of his own party, the Catholic People's Party. Van Agt denied van Zon's luxurious life in prison. Van Zon was released in early 1986. His life sentence was converted to 28.5 years and reduced by a third because of good behaviour.

== Further life ==
After his release, van Zon was not left alone by the press. His private life, especially his drinking addiction, came into the media's attention. Van Zon and Van der Brink divorced in 1995. During the last years of his life, van Zon lived in Wirdum and Delfzijl, where he died in 1998, as a result of excessive and prolonged drinking. At his funeral, his ex-wife Riet, a number of neighbours, an acquaintance, an employee of the van Mesdag clinic, lawyer Hans Anker and a friendly journalist were present.

In 2015, the novel In the House with a Serial Killer by D66 leader Jan Terlouw and his daughter Sanne was published. It is based on their memories of the time that van Zon often visited a friend who rented a room with the Terlouw family at Utrecht Tolsteegsingel.

The True Crime book: "Suspenders for a serial killer" was published in 2020 by crime journalist Loes Leeman. In this book Loes describes her crush as fifteen-year-old girl for Hans van Zon and the relationship she had with the serial killer after his pardon in 1986.

The book about serial killer Hans van Z.: :"Murder Confessions in exchange for sex" will be published in 2025. A revealing investigation book by crime journalist Loes Leeman about twenty murders of which Hans van Zon is suspected, committed in the years before and after being in detention.

== See also ==
- List of serial killers by country
