= Sybren van Tuinen =

Dutch politician

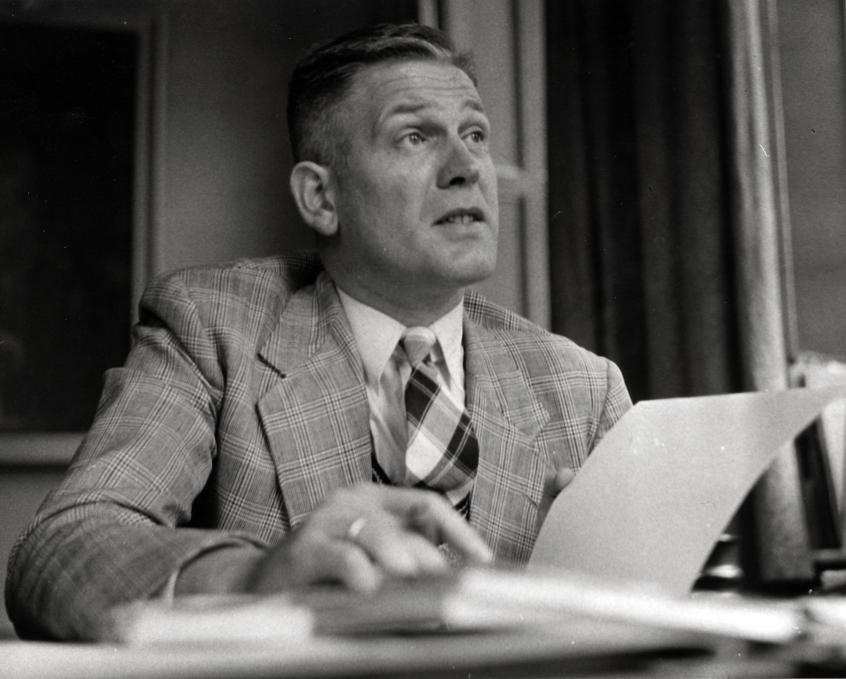
- Born: 5 March 1913
- Died: 29 April 1993 (aged 80)

Sybren van Tuinen (5 March 1913 – 29 April 1993) was a Dutch politician and public servant. Trained as a history teacher during World War II, he was acting mayor of Bolsward and mayor of Dokkum, and then for twenty years a representative in the Provincial States of Friesland. He served for two years in the Dutch Senate for the Anti-Revolutionary Party, and then became mayor of Kampen.

== Biography ==
Sybren van Tuinen was born in the village of Sexbierum (municipality of Waadhoeke), Friesland, on 5 March 1913 in a Reformed family. His mother was Dirkje Brouwer, his father Pieter van Tuinen, who taught at a school of education in Dokkum. He attended the "Gereformeerd Gymnasium" (a Reformed gymnasium in Huizum, Leeuwarden) from 1927 to 1932, and then moved to Amsterdam to attend the Vrije Universiteit Amsterdam, where between 1932 and 1940 he studied history. He married Minke Lieuwina Sytsma, daughter of Senator S. L. Sytsma, in 1940 (they became parents of two sons), and that same year was hired as a history teacher at the Hogere Burgerschool of Leeuwarden, where he worked until 1943. During World War II he was active as a regional commander in the Ordedienst, the anti-German resistance; toward the end of the war he was imprisoned in Leeuwarden.

From April 1945 to May 1946, Van Tuinen was acting mayor of the Frisian city of Bolsward, and then became mayor of Dokkum (1946 - 1970). In addition, he was a member of the Provincial States of Friesland from 1950 to 1970. In 1969 he became a member of the Dutch Senate for the Anti-Revolutionary Party, where he served until 1971; he was the ARP's spokesperson for public housing, spatial planning, and social work. In 1976 he was made Officer of the Order of Orange-Nassau. His last public position was as mayor of Kampen, until 1978.

He died in Hattem on 29 April 1993.
