= Puck Moonen =

Dutch cyclist (born 1996)

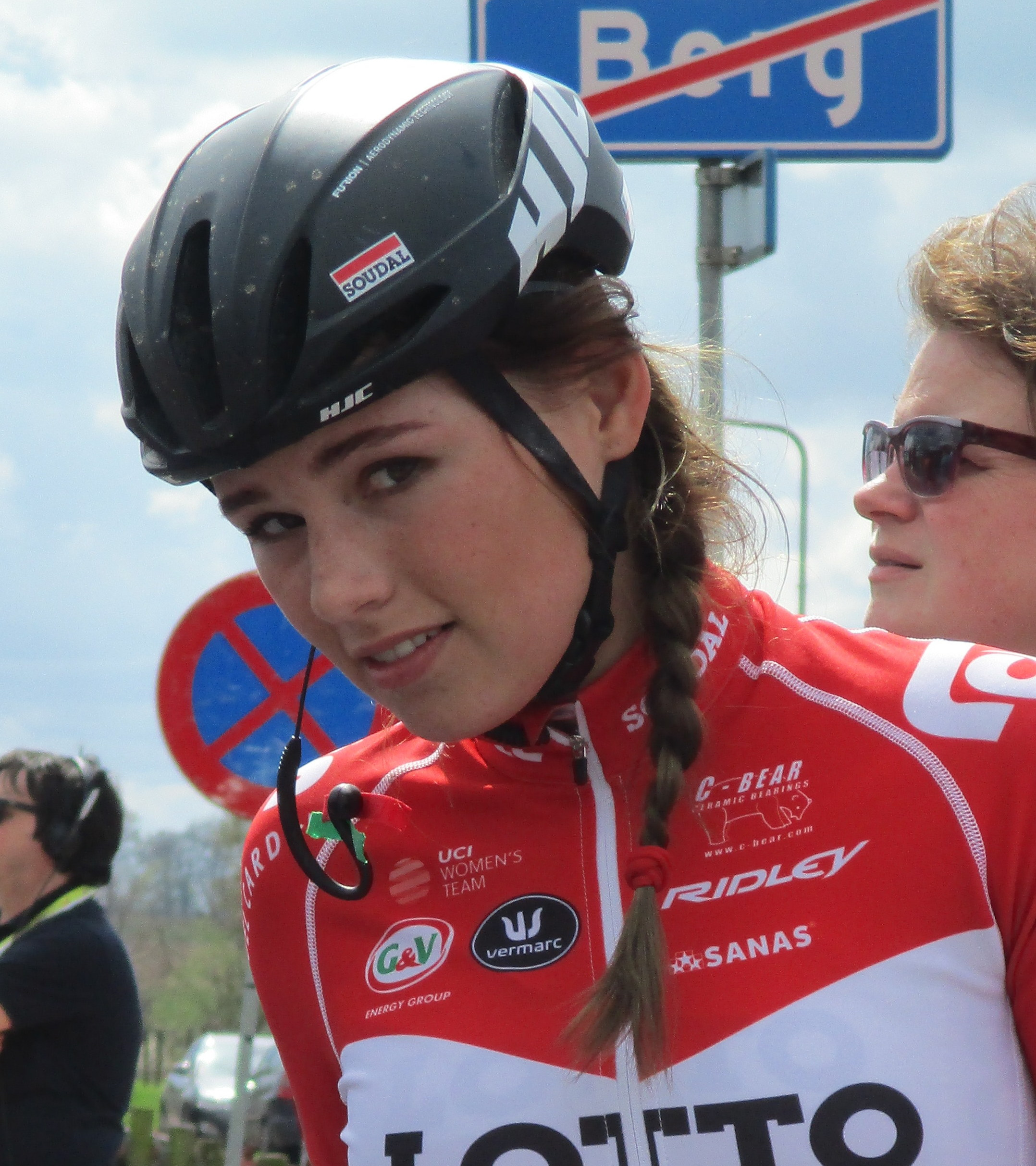
- Moonen in 2018

Personal information
- Full name: Puck Moonen
- Born: 20 March 1996 (age 30) Sint-Michielsgestel, Netherlands
- Height: 1.67 m (5 ft 6 in)

Cycling career
- Sport: Cycling
- Discipline: Road
- Role: Rider

Professional teams
- 2017–2019: Lotto–Soudal Ladies
- 2020–2021: Chevalmeire Cycling Team

Puck Moonen (born 20 March 1996 in Sint-Michielsgestel) is a Dutch cyclist, who has ridden in the past for UCI Women's Continental Team Chevalmeire. She previously rode for Lotto Soudal but left, in part due to a knee injury. In 2019, she became a spokesperson for Buddy Network, an anti-bullying campaign sponsored by Cartoon Network and Awel, a Dutch-language Belgian helpline for children.

== Sports career ==
Moonen, who began studying physics and chemistry in preparation for medical school, rode with the UCI Women's Team Lotto-Soudal Ladies from 2017 to 2019. From 2016 to 2019 she was in a relationship with cyclocross rider Eli Iserbyt.

In May 2017, Moonen was named the most beautiful athlete in the Netherlands by FHM magazine.

In September 2019, Moonen announced that she had signed a two-year contract with UCI Women's Continental team Chevalmeire Cycling. In May 2020, she announced in an interview that she was tired of being seen as a "cycling babe" and wanted to be taken seriously as a cyclist.

Her goal is to become world champion within the next four years. After internal quarrels and disagreements with team captain Thalita de Jong, the contract was terminated on July 3, 2021.

In 2022 she rode for GRV Jan van Arckel. In 2023, she launched her own cycling training collection with Assos.

== Social media ==
As an Influencer, Moonen has 880,000 Followers on Instagram.
