= Aat de Peijper =

Dutch industrialist and philatelist

- Born: 1907
- Died: 1998 (aged 90–91)
- Occupation: Philatelist

Adriaan "Aat" de Peijper (died 1998) was a Dutch industrialist and philatelist whose collection of Dutch, Dutch colonial, and British Commonwealth stamps included several world rarities.

== Career ==
Until 1987 De Peijper was director of a pharmaceutical distribution company in Etten-Leur. De Peijper and his company Centrafarm won a number of court battles concerning their redistribution of medicines within the EU, including some against Sterling Drug / Winthrop that are considered landmark cases.

== Philately ==
De Peijper began collecting stamps from a young age but according to his wife Mrs M.W. de Peijper-Pieksma, it was not until later in life that he was able to afford the more expensive items missing from his collection. He bought many items from the Samos collection, and also items formerly in the Boker, Burrus, Casapry, and Dale-Lichtenstein collections.

His collection was principally of the stamps of the Netherlands, with a focus on the first issue, the British Commonwealth and Dutch colonies. Among the rarities in the collection was a 1925 Kenya and Uganda £100 (SG105) unused plate number postage stamp (signed A. Diena in the margin), one of four unused copies known in private collections and museums. Another rare item was a 1925 unused Ceylon 1000R (SG323) plate number single with a certificate by Friedl. Both were formerly in the Samos collection. The de Peijper collection was auctioned by De Nederlandsche Postzegelveiling in 2013, with the £100 Kenya and Uganda stamp reckoned to be the most valuable stamp ever to be auctioned in the Netherlands.

== Stamps of the de Peijper collection ==
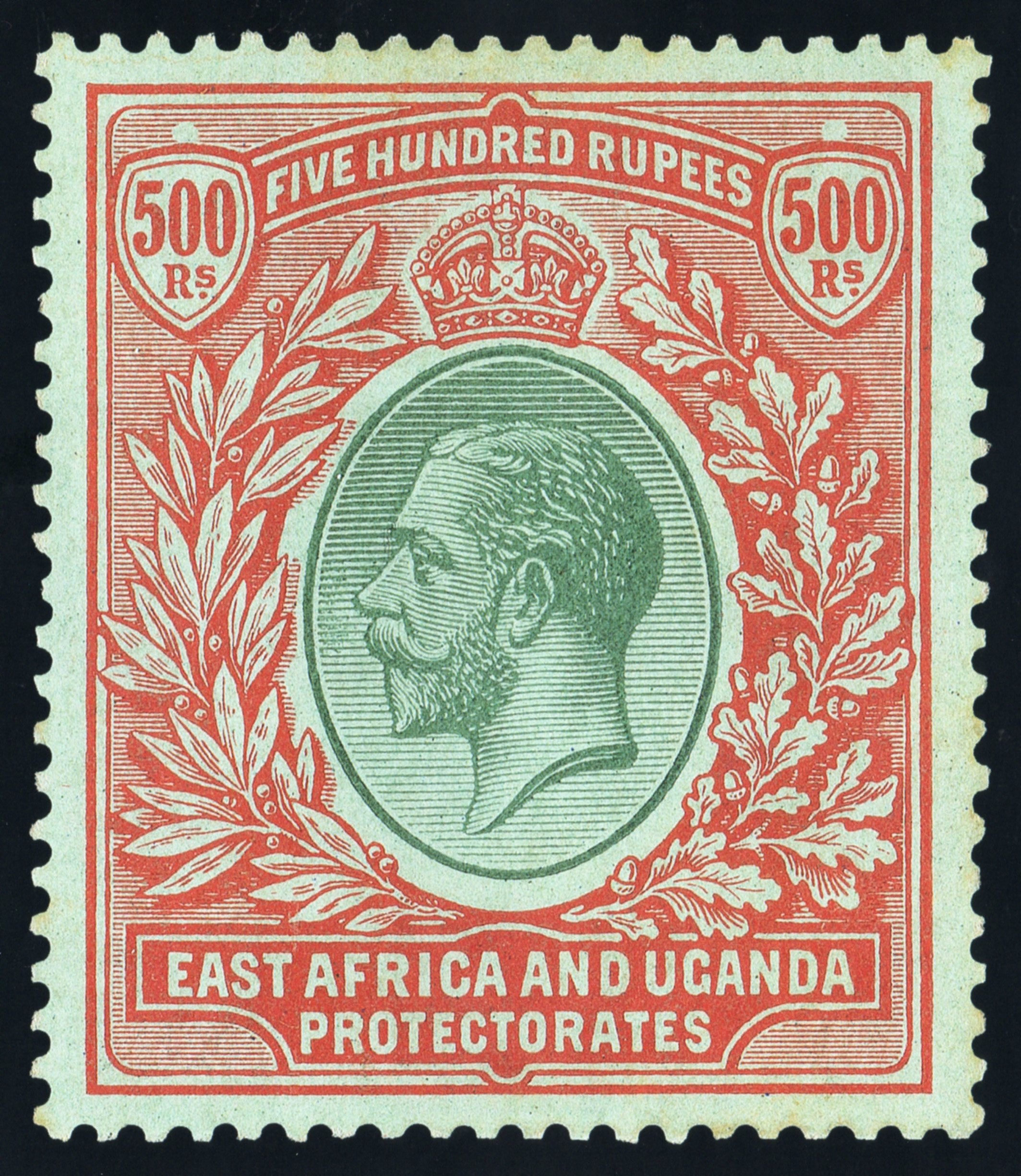
1912, East Africa & Uganda Protectorates, 500R. Formerly in the Samos collection.

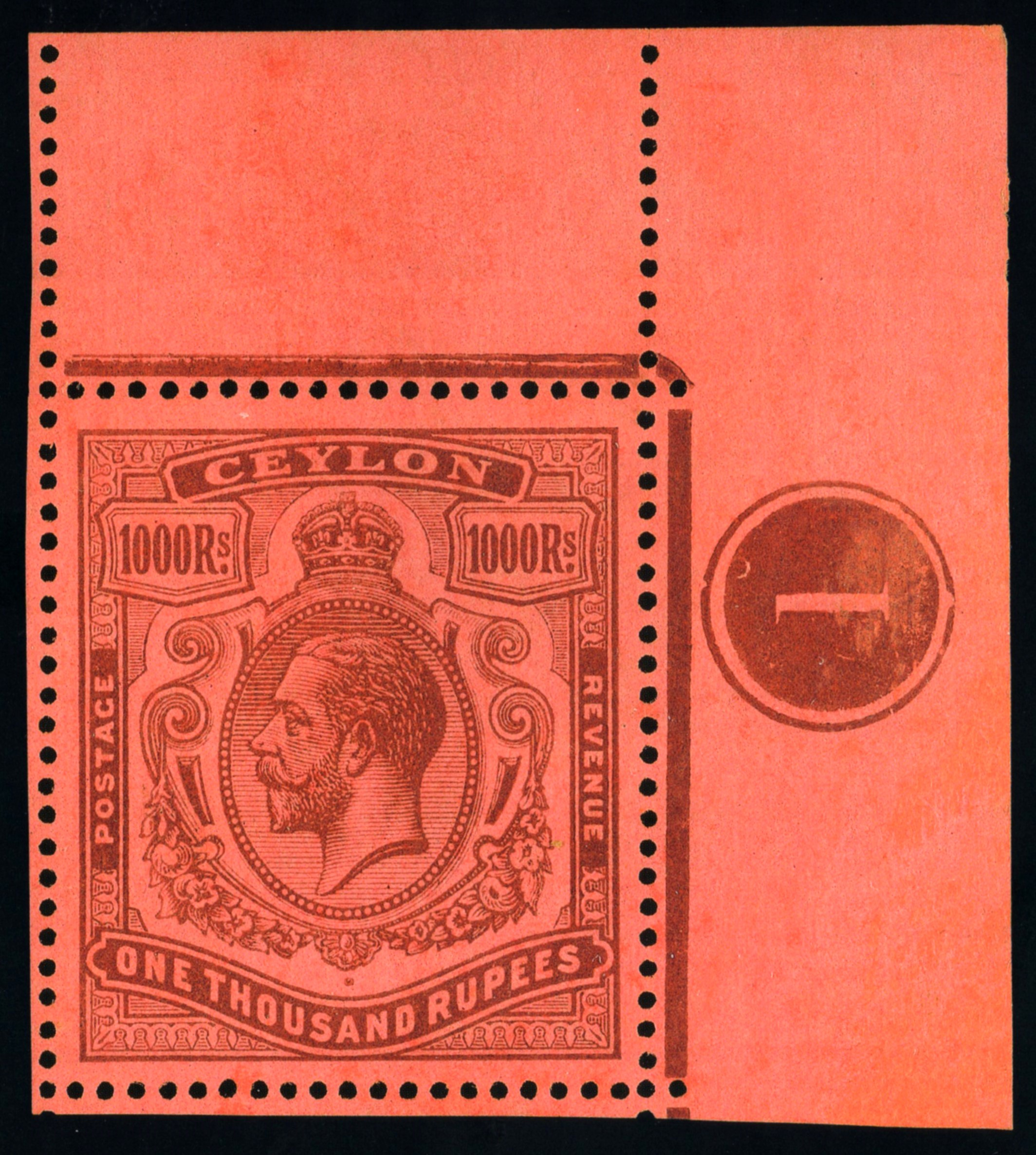
1925, Ceylon 1000R plate number single.

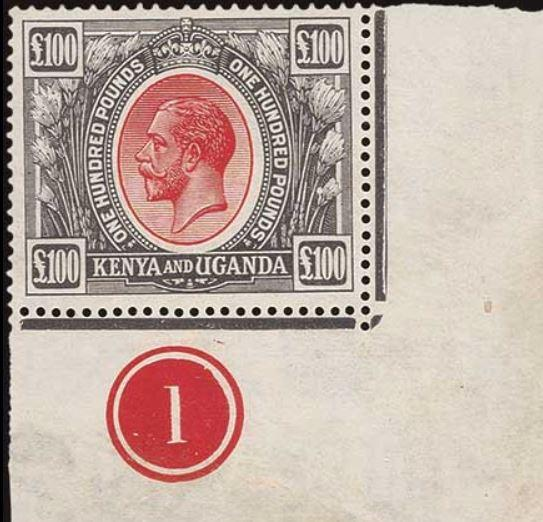
1925, Kenya & Uganda £100 plate number single.
