= Greetje Donker =

Dutch dancer (1906–1993)

Maria Margaretha "Greetje" Donker (December 13, 1906 – February 3, 1993) was a Dutch dancer.

She was born in Amsterdam. She was associated with Florrie Rodrigo in the group Les Quatres Femmes Rodrigo, and she also performed with Ballet der Lage Landen. She provided the choreography and costume design for Modeshow by the Scapino Ballet.

Donker was a member of the editorial staff for De Vonk, an underground socialist newspaper published during World War II. During the German occupation of the Netherlands, she hid Jews in her home and found shelter for others. In 1986, Donker was named Righteous Among the Nations by Yad Vashem, the World Holocaust Remembrance Center.

Donker died in Amsterdam at the age of 86.
