= Marloes Wittenberg =

Dutch judoka (born 1983)

Marloes Wittenberg (born August 31, 1983, in Boxtel) is a Dutch judoka.

Wittenberg won the third place in the Dutch Championships two times in a row. She was downed by a knee injury in December 2004. After recovering from this injury, she won the third place in the Dutch Championships again in 2008. Currently she is an English teacher at the Huygens Lyceum in Eindhoven.
