= Elie Aron Cohen =

Elie Aron Cohen (16 July 1909 in Groningen – 22 October 1993 in Arnhem) was a Dutch medical doctor who, being Jewish, was sent to the Auschwitz concentration camp. He arrived there on 16 September 1943. His first wife, his first son as well as his parents-in-law were killed upon arrival, but he managed to survive through a combination of chance and skill. His status and abilities as a doctor were instrumental for his survival. On 6 May 1945 he was liberated by the U.S. military in Melk (Austria), where he had been transported by way of Mauthausen-Gusen. After World War II, Elie Cohen remarried a Jewish woman. They have two children, a daughter and a son. Elie Cohen is the author of a number of books about the Holocaust. The first of these was the Ph.D. thesis on which he graduated on 11 March 1952, at Utrecht State University (supervisor: H.C. Rümke, professor of psychiatry). The book (in Dutch) was entitled "The German Concentration Camp — a medical and psychological study", and it was one of the first scientific descriptions of what had happened in killing centres such as Auschwitz. It also provided an analysis of the psychology of the SS-men who manned these camps and of their victims: the prisoners. At that time there was little interest in the Netherlands in recounting these events, but surprisingly the thesis was much in demand. It was later translated into English, Swedish and Japanese.

Elie Cohen went on to write a number of books and publications about extermination camps such as Auschwitz and Sobibor and their survivors. He was instrumental in obtaining official recognition in the Netherlands of the "post-concentration camp syndrome" from which many survivors came to suffer in their later years.

A bridge over the Van Starkenborgh Canal near the town of Aduard, where he lived and worked, was named after Cohen in 2023.

== Publications ==
- Het Duitse concentratiekamp. Een medische en psychologische studie.(Ph.D. thesis, Utrecht State University) Amsterdam: H.J. Paris Publisher, first edition March 1952, ix + 258 p.; second ed. May 1952, third ed. 1954. With summaries in Dutch (p. 237-240), French (p. 241-244), English (p. 245-248) and German (p. 249-252) (no ISBN).
- Human Behaviour in the Concentration Camp. English translation of thesis Het Duitse concentratiekamp. Translated by M.H. Braaksma. First English editions: New York: Grosset & Dunlap, 1954; London: Cape, 1954; 295 p. Reprint edition, with new introductions: London: Free Association Books, 1988; 336 p. ISBN 9781853430473.
- 'Het post-concentratiekampsyndroom' (The post-concentration camp syndrome). In: Nederlands Tijdschrift voor Geneeskunde (Netherlands Journal of Medical Science), vol. 113, number 46 (15 November 1969), p. 2049–2054.
- 'Het rijk van de dood: de psychologie van de concentratiekampgevangene' (The realm of death: the psychology of the concentration camp prisoner). In: Bericht van de Tweede Wereldoorlog (Reports of the Second World War), editors: A.H. Paape, P.W. Klein, A.F. Manning, R.L. Schuursma, P.R.A. van Iddekinge. Amsterdam: De Geïllustreerde Pers, Leiden: Nederlandse Rotogravure Maatschappij, Haarlem: Uitgeverij Spaarnestad, 6 volumes, 1970–1971. Vol. 6 (1971), p. 2507–2509.
- De Afgrond. Een egodocument. Amsterdam/Brussels: Paris/Manteau Publishers, 1971; 88 p. Publication in book form of four interviews with journalist Joop van Tijn, that had previously appeared in the weekly Vrij Nederland) ISBN 90-6006-123-3
- The Abyss: A confession. New York: Norton Publishers, first edition January 1973; 111 p. English translation of De Afgrond. Translated by James Brockway. ISBN 0-393-07477-3.
- 'Het post-concentratiekampsyndroom: een "disaster"-syndroom' (The post-concentration camp syndrome: a 'disaster'-syndrome). In: Nederlands Tijdschrift voor Geneeskunde (Netherlands Journal of Medical Science), vol. 116, number 38 (1972), p. 1680-1685 (with an English summary on p. 1685).
- De negentien treinen naar Sobibor (The nineteen trains to Sobibor). Amsterdam/Brussels: Elsevier, first ed. 1979; 216 p. ISBN 90-10-02513-6; third ed. Amsterdam: Sijthoff, 1985; 216 p. ISBN 90-218-3370-0.
- Beelden uit de nacht. Kampherinneringen (Images from the night. Camp memoirs). Baarn: De Prom, 1992; 192 p. ISBN 90-6801-322-X

== Sources ==
Elie Cohen's biography (in Dutch) on the site of the digital library of Dutch letters
