= Joseph Martinus Stultiens =

Joseph Martinus Stultiens was a silversmith and metalworker in Toronto, Boston, New York and The Hague (The Netherlands). He was a member of the Society of Arts and Crafts Boston, which advanced him in 1926 to the grade of 'master craftsman'.

== Life ==
Joseph Martinus Stultiens was born on 15 March 1887 in Weert, The Netherlands. Nothing is known about his youth and education. In May 1912 he arrived by steamship in Québec, Canada. On 8 September 1914 he married Elizabeth Adele Grobbel (Elsie) in Toronto. In December 1915 Joseph and Elsie crossed the border at Niagara/Buffalo on their way to Boston. In 1923/1926 Joseph and Elsie lived in Flushing (NY). Their marriage ends in a divorce. On 10 May 1933 Joseph remarried in The Hague (Josephine Catharine van Batenburg), where he lived until his death on 30 November 1956.

== Work ==
=== Archives ===
In 1996 his archives were found at an attic in the Dutch town of Haarlem. The archives consist chiefly of designs and photographs of realised works.

=== Canada and America ===
In Canada and America he mainly made objects by commission of churches: goblets, dishes, memorial plates etc.

His most impressive work is the bronze angel lectern he made in commission of St. Thomas's Anglican Church in Toronto. It was cast by T.F. McGann & Sons in Boston, transported from Boston to Toronto and placed in the church in 1917.

=== The Society of Arts and Crafts ===
Stultiens was a member of The Society of Arts and Crafts Boston, which advanced him to ‘master craftsman’ because of the excellent quality of his work. The archives of Stultiens were handed over to the Public Library in Boston, where they were added to the archives of The Society of Arts and Crafts. Stultiens exhibited at the Society

=== The Hague ===
In The Hague Joseph was mainly occupied with jewellery. In his archives are only designs of bracelets and necklaces. Photographs of completed items are lacking, so it is unknown whether his designs have been actually made.
