= Elisa Piek =

Dutch badminton player (born 1993)

Personal information
- Born: Elisa Piek; 15 June 1993 (age 33)

Sport
- Country: Netherlands
- Sport: Badminton

Women's & mixed doubles
- Highest ranking: 389 (WD, 18 September 2014); 357 (XD, 12 June 2014)
- BWF profile

Elisa Piek (born 15 June 1993) is a Dutch badminton player specializing in doubles play. In 2013, she won Suriname International tournament in mixed doubles with her partner, Dave Khodabux. She is the younger sister of Dutch international player Selena Piek.

== Achievements ==
=== BWF International Challenge/Series ===
Mixed doubles
Year	Tournament	Partner	Opponent	Score	Result
2013	Suriname International	(Netherlands) Dave Khodabux	(Suriname) Mitchel Wongsodikromo (Suriname) Crystal Leefmans	21–17, 18–21, 21–19	(gold) Winner

Commonwealth Youth Games tournament
BWF International Series tournament
BWF Future Series tournament
