= Luc Stultiens =

Dutch politician (born 1993)

Member of the House of Representatives
- Incumbent
- Assumed office 9 December 2023

Personal details
- Born: 17 July 1993 (age 33) Utrecht, Netherlands
- Party: Progressief Nederland (2026-now)
- Other political affiliations: GroenLinks (until 2026)

Luc Cornelis Joseph Stultiens (born 17 July 1993) is a Dutch politician representing Progressief Nederland (PRO).

== Political career ==
He was elected to the House of Representatives in the 2023 Dutch general election. His focus has been on higher education, taxes, pensions, and government benefits.

When an early retirement scheme for workers in physically demanding occupations neared expiration and negotiations about its extension stalled, Stultiens and Bart van Kent (SP) filed an amendment to make the scheme permanent and to raise its maximum benefits. They planned to fund the expansion through canceling a planned broadening of the earnings stripping rule for large corporations. Negotiations facilitated by social affairs minister Eddy van Hijum finally led to an agreement on a permanent scheme in October 2024.

In its 2025 budget, the Schoof cabinet intended to cut the education budget by €2 billion annually. To approve the plans, the coalition government relied on opposition support, as they did not hold a majority in the Senate. In November 2024, Stultiens proposed to reverse the cuts through an amendment with support of the Socialist Party (SP), the Party for the Animals (PvdD), Denk, and Volt. They aimed to secure alternative government funding by combating tax avoidance, introducing a digital services tax, and reducing fossil fuel subsidies.

=== House committee assignments ===
- Committee for Social Affairs and Employment (vice chair)
- Committee for Education, Culture and Science
- Public Expenditure committee
- Committee for Finance

== Electoral history ==
Electoral history of Luc Stultiens
Year	Body	Party	Pos.	Votes	Result		Ref.
Year	Body	Party	Pos.	Votes	Party seats	Individual	Ref.
2023	House of Representatives	GroenLinks–PvdA	25	2,577	25 / 150	Lost (Note: Stultiens was not elected despite his party's result due to another candidate meeting the threshold for preference votes. However, he did receive a seat in the body due to Kauthar Bouchallikht declining hers.)	
2025	House of Representatives	GroenLinks–PvdA	7	2,250	20 / 150	Won	
2026	The Hague Municipal Council	GroenLinks–PvdA	50 (Note: Stultiens participated as lijstduwer.)	33	7 / 45	Lost	

== See also ==
- List of members of the House of Representatives of the Netherlands, 2023–present
