= Florrie Rodrigo =

Dutch dancer and choreographer (1893–1996)

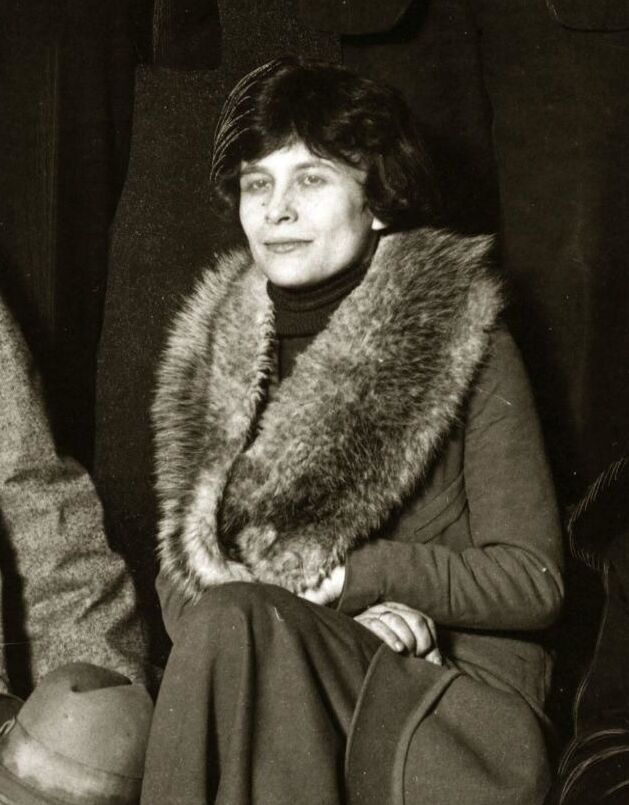
Florrie Rodrigo in 1925

Flora Juda Rodrigues, known as Florrie Rodrigo, (September 3, 1893 – July 11, 1996) was a Dutch dancer, choreographer, and educator considered to be one of the pioneers of modern dance in the Netherlands .

The daughter of Mordechaij Rodrigues and Rebecca Reindorp, both diamond workers, she was born in Amsterdam. She became involved with De Universalisten, an artistic group based in Amsterdam. In 1920, she moved to Berlin. Her performance at an event there led to a month-long engagement at the cabaret Die Rakete. Rodrigo grew in popularity because her style of dance fitted with the Expressionist dance movement in Germany that was prevalent at the time. However, in 1924, due to growing anti-Semitism in Germany, she returned to Amsterdam, where she taught dance during the day and performed in the evenings. In 1926, she became involved with the social democratic Instituut voor Arbeiders-Ontwikkeling. Her 1933 performance of "Three Jewish Group Dances" was the first time that she had incorporated her Jewish identity into her art. In the same year, she joined the Communist Party of the Netherlands. Following her performance of Schepelingen, based on the bombing of the HNLMS De Zeven Provinciën by the Dutch, she fell out of favour with Dutch authorities and had a harder time finding venues for performing. Although she was able to avoid persecution in Amsterdam because of her non-Jewish husband, her mother and sister were executed in Nazi concentration camps. From 1935 to 1937, she performed at a resort in Brussels. She performed there in the group Les Quatre Femmes Rodrigo with three other dancers: Martha Bruyn, Selma Chapon, and Greetje Donker.

After 1949, she stopped performing and dedicated herself to teaching. In 1993, on her hundredth birthday, a bust of Rodrigo was unveiled at the Amsterdam City Theater. When she was 91, she became a member of the Order of Orange-Nassau.

In 1915, Rodrigo married Hartog Bierman, an actor. The couple divorced in 1920. Two years later, she married Cornelis de Dood, a journalist.

Rodrigo died in Amsterdam at the age of 102.
