= Marloes Frieswijk =

Dutch korfball player

Sport
- Country: Netherlands
- Sport: Korfball

Marloes Frieswijk (born March 25, 1996, in Heerenveen) is a Dutch Korfball player.
