= 2014 in Dutch television =

This is a list of Dutch television related events from 2014.

== Events ==
- 21 February - 13-year-old Ayoub Maach wins the third series of The Voice Kids, becoming the first boy to be crowned as winner.
- 25 October - 81-year-old opera singer Léon Lissitza wins the seventh series of Holland's Got Talent.
- 19 December - Three-piece girl group O'G3NE win the fifth series of The Voice of Holland, becoming the first group to emerge as winners.

== Television shows ==
=== 1950s ===
- NOS Journaal (1956–present)

=== 1970s ===
- Sesamstraat (1976–present)

=== 1980s ===
- Jeugdjournaal (1981–present)
- Het Klokhuis (1988–present)

=== 1990s ===
- Goede tijden, slechte tijden (1990–present)

=== 2000s ===
- X Factor (2006–present)
- Holland's Got Talent (2008–present)

=== 2010s ===
- The Voice of Holland (2010–present)

== Networks and services ==
=== Launches ===
Network	Type	Launch date	Notes	Source
MTV Hits	Cable television	27 May		

=== Conversions and rebrandings ===
Old network name	New network name	Type	Conversion Date	Notes	Source
Cultura 24	NPO Cultura	Cable television	Unknown		
Best24	NPO Best	Cable television	Unknown		
101 TV	NPO 101	Cable television	10 March		
Humor TV 24	NPO Humor TV	Cable television	10 March		
Politiek 24	NPO Politiek	Cable television	10 March		
Holland Doc 24	NPO Doc	Cable television	10 March		
Journaal 24	NPO Nieuws	Cable television	10 March		
Zappelin 24	NPO Zappelin Xtra	Cable television	10 March		
Nederland 1	NPO 1	Cable television	19 August		
Nederland 2	NPO 2	Cable television	19 August		
Nederland 3	NPO 3	Cable television	19 August		

== See also ==
- 2014 in the Netherlands
