= NPO Humor TV =

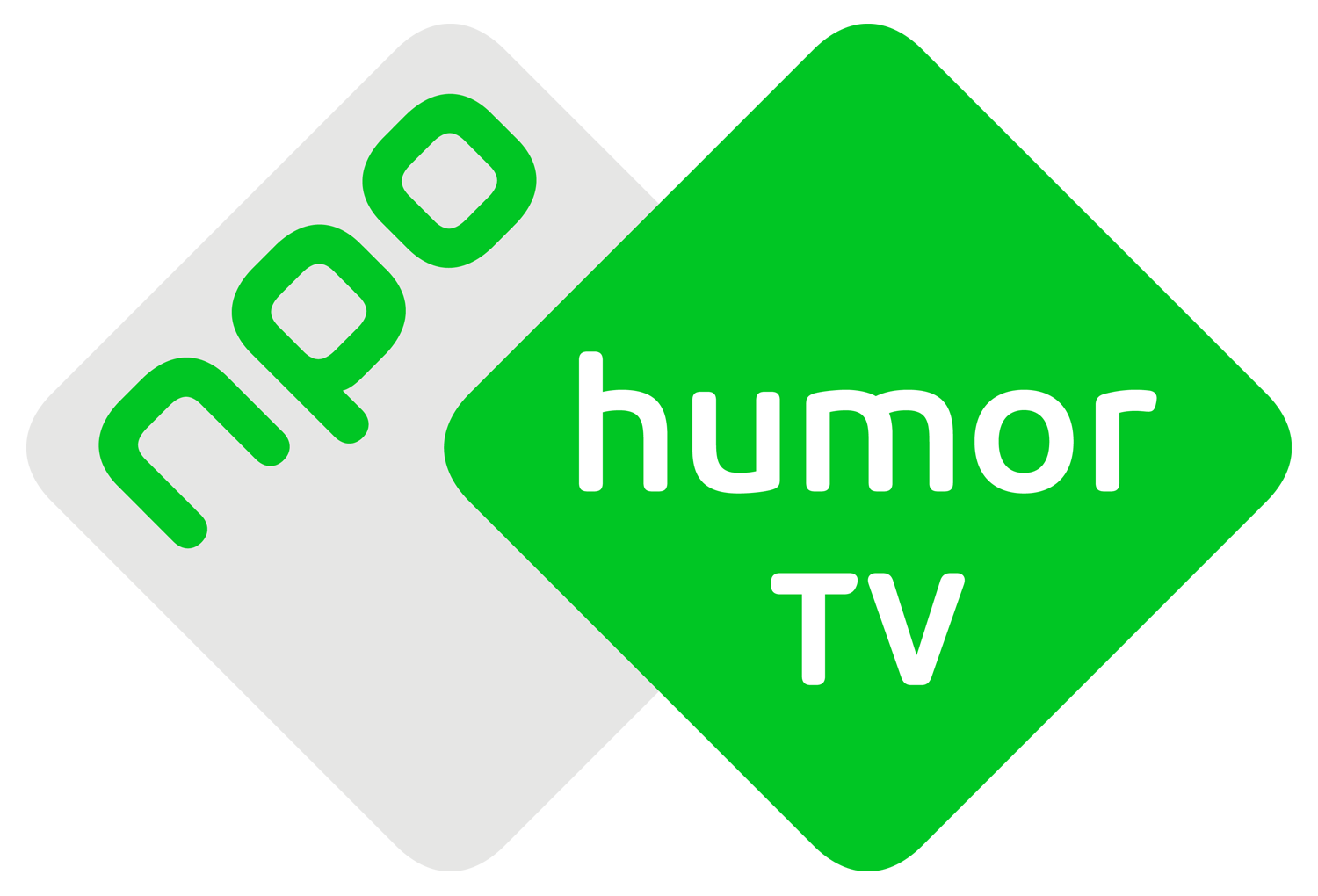
- Country: Netherlands
- Network: VARA

Programming
- Picture format: 576i 16:9 (SDTV)

Ownership
- Owner: NPO
- Sister channels: NPO 1 NPO 2 NPO 3 NPO 3 Extra; NPO 1 Extra; NPO 2 Extra; NPO Doc; NPO Nieuws; NPO Politiek en Nieuws; NPO Sport; NPO Zappelin Extra

History
- Launched: 15 November 2006
- Closed: 1 July 2016
- Former names: Humor TV (2006-2009); Humor TV 24 (2009-2014)

Links
- Website: humortv.vara.nl

NPO Humor TV was a digital theme channel of the Netherlands Public Broadcasting dedicated to comedy, cabaret and satire. The channel started as Humor TV on 15 November 2006. On 10 March 2014, Humor TV 24 changed its name to NPO Humor TV. Due to cuts in public broadcasting NPO Humor TV would stop broadcasting on 1 July 2016.

== Arise ==
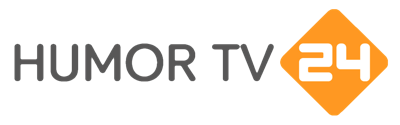
Humor TV 24 logo used from 2009 until 2014.

Humor TV was founded on 15 November 2006. It began as an Internet channel of the former Nederland 24. It then was a channel owned by the VARA. After several years, they also started broadcasting via digital TV, where they also went broadcasting twenty-four hours a day, with which the name is changed in Humor TV 24. From that time there were also other broadcasters with more foreign and were there, most bought English from the BBC series. On 10 March 2014, the channel name changed to the current.

== Platforms ==
NPO Humor TV consists of different platforms:

- The channel itself;
- The temporary block on NPO 3 called Humor TV presenteert...
- The website humortv.vara.nl;
- The channel's app

== Broadcasts ==
The programming consists largely of reruns of satirical and cabaret programmes of VARA, BNN VPRO and NTR, but also entire cabaret programmes of comedians. It also airs recordings of cabaret festivals and movies of cabaret novice writers.

=== Programming schedule ===
The schedule looks like this:

Time	Programming
00:00 to 03:00	Loop block previous day
03:00 to 09:00	Night and morning programming
09:00 to 12:00	Loop block previous day
12:00 to 18:00	Loop block previous day
18:00 to 24:00	New programming block

However, this creates a lot of repetition, especially in the night programming, which consists of a number of programmes from the previous days. The programming does not consist of regular programme at a regular time, but are randomized.
