= NPO Doc =

- Country: Netherlands
- Broadcast area: Netherlands
- Network: VPRO

Programming
- Language: Dutch
- Picture format: 576i 16:9 SDTV

Ownership
- Owner: NPO
- Sister channels: NPO 1 NPO 2 NPO 3 NPO 3 Extra; NPO 1 Extra; NPO 2 Extra; NPO Humor TV; NPO Nieuws; NPO Politiek en Nieuws; NPO Sport; NPO Zappelin Extra

History
- Launched: 1 December 2004; 21 years ago
- Closed: 30 June 2016
- Former names: Holland Doc (2004-2014)

Links
- Website: npodoc.nl

NPO Doc was a documentary television channel in the Netherlands. It was a digital theme channel, available 24 hours, 7 days a week. Typically programs were in the Dutch language. Some programmes were also in the original language with Dutch subtitles.

It was one of the first two channels to be launched as part of the Nederland 4 project on 1 December 2004, alongside 3VOOR12, both owned by the VPRO. On 10 March 2014, Holland Doc 24 changed its name into NPO Doc.

The channel closed on 30 June 2016.

== Logos and identities ==
Holland Doc logo used from 2004 until 2009.

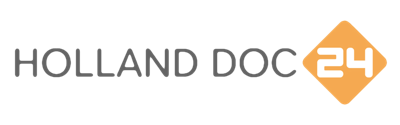
Holland Doc 24 logo used from 2009 until 2014.
