= Nederland 24 =

Specialty television channels of the Dutch public broadcasting system

Nederland 24 was the collective name for a number of specialty television channels from the Dutch public broadcasting system. It also broadcasts a sample channel of the same name featuring a mix of programming from the other thematic channels. A couple of these specialty channel are still available, but are now fully under the wings of the NPO.

Originally it consisted of four channels, peaking at seventeen channels, which were available through cable and online. Currently, only four of the channels survive under the NPO Themakanalen umbrella.

== Overview ==
The Nederland 24 channels were an expansion of the Dutch public broadcasting system, in which public broadcasting associations provide general programming. Based on the number of active members, broadcasting associations receive airtime on three national public television stations (NPO 1, NPO 2 and NPO 3). The thematic channels offered these broadcasting associations more airtime to expand its core programming. These channels broadcast round-the-clock, all day, hence the "24" part of the name.

== History ==
The name Nederland 4 was first used in 2000 for a proposed fourth national public network with content provided by NOS and the regional public stations. The chances of opening such a channel fell in December when negotiations fell through.

Logo as Nederland 4

The first step towards Nederland 24 was made by the VPRO broadcasting association with the introduction of 3VOOR12TV in May 2003. The success of this theme channel led to the launch of 3VOOR12 Central, 3VOOR12 On Stage, Journaal 24, and Holland Doc channels in December 2004 and /Geschiedenis in February 2005. The channels were announced in December 2004. According to Peter Schrurs, in order for the channels to have success, they were building their own identity, and looking for external partners. Holland Doc and the restructured 3VOOR12 were the first to launch on 1 December 2004 and the other channels would launch months later. Initially Nederland 4 was being used with the start of the internet portal Nederland4.nl on 6 April 2005.

From November 2006 the Dutch public broadcasting system started with the expansion of the number of channels to a total of 17. By 2009 this number dropped to 12 channels. The Nederland-e, DNTV, 3VOOR12 Central, and 3VOOR12 On Stage channels were cancelled and /Geloven and Omega TV merged into Spirit 24. That same month, its twelve channels were available on streaming using the Microsoft Silverlight platform. On 1 April 2009, the Nederland 4 branding changed to Nederland 24, with the names of the theme channels including the "24" as a prefix, except for 101 TV.

In January 2009 it was announced that the political channel Politiek 24 would change into a sport/politics channel. Opvoeden doe je zo! changed to Z@ppelin 24, a children's channel. In August, 37% of all households and 55% of households with digital television had access to the Nederland 24 channels. To raise awareness, it launched the "1 + 2 + 3 = 24" (alluding to the three channels' contents being shown on the Nederland 24 brand) through its value-added services: live broadcasts, exclusive programmes and previews of upcoming programmes on the three main channels.

On 1 April 2012, it cut its offer from twelve channels to eight.

NPO 2 Extra is expected to close on 31 December 2026. Only three of the channels will survive (NPO 1 Extra, NPO Politiek and NPO Sport).

== Current channels ==
- NPO 1 Extra, formerly NPO Best and Best 24.
- NPO 2 Extra, formerly NPO Cultura and Cultura 24.
- NPO Politiek en Nieuws, formerly Politiek 24 and NPO Politiek.
- NPO Sport, formerly Sport 24

== Defunct channels ==
- 3VOOR12 Central: innovative music videos and talk about alternative pop music. Shut down in 2008. Programmed by the VPRO.
- 3VOOR12 On Stage: alternative pop performances and coverage of festivals like Pinkpop and Lowlands. Programmed by the VPRO.
- Consumenten 24: began as Consumenten TV and was programmed by several of the broadcasters, offering an insight on consumer defense. Shut down on March 31, 2012.
- DNTV (Dier en Natuur TV): a channel with main emphasis on animals and nature. Shut down on December 31, 2008. Programmed by the AVRO.
- Family 24: began as Opvoeden doe je zo! in 2006. Channel dedicated to parenting. Shut down in 2011 and merged with Z@pp Extra. Programmed by the KRO.
- Geloven: a channel dedicated to Protestantism. Shut down on December 31, 2008. Programmed by the NCRV.
- Geschiedenis 24: began as /Geschiedenis, featuring documentaries, reports and films about historic Dutch events. Shut down on March 31, 2012. Programmed by the VPRO and the NPS/NTR.
- Nederland-e: an educational channel. Shut down on December 31, 2008. Programmed by Teleac-NOT and RVU.
- NPO 3 Extra, formerly NPO 101 and 101TV, started in 2006 as a youth channel programmed by the BNN. Renamed NPO 3 Extra in March 2018 and shut down on December 24, 2018.
- NPO Doc: began as Holland Doc 24, the channel offered documentary themes with the central theme changing weekly. Programmed by the VPRO. After its shutdown in 2016 it became a programming strand on NPO 2, 2DOC.
- NPO Humor TV: began as Humor TV 24, broadcast comedy programs. Shut down in 2016. Programmed by the VARA.
- Spirit 24: created from the merger of Omega TV (programmed by the EO) and /Geloven, broadcast archived programming from the confessional broadcasters. Shut down on March 31, 2012.
- Sterren 24, began as Sterren.nl.
- NPO Nieuws, formerly Journaal 24.
- NPO Zappelin Extra, formerly Z@ppelin / Z@pp 24 and NPO Zapp Xtra.

== See also ==
- 3voor12
- Digital television in the Netherlands
- Netherlands Public Broadcasting
- Television in the Netherlands
