= NPO Zappelin Extra =

- Country: Netherlands
- Network: AVROTROS; EO; KRO-NCRV; NTR; VPRO

Programming
- Language: Dutch
- Picture format: 576i 16:9 (SDTV)

Ownership
- Owner: NPO
- Sister channels: NPO 1 NPO 2 NPO 3 NPO 1 Extra; NPO 2 Extra; NPO Nieuws; NPO Politiek en Nieuws; NPO Sport

History
- Launched: 30 May 2009; 16 years ago
- Closed: 15 December 2021; 4 years ago
- Replaced by: NPO 3 Extra
- Former names: Z@ppelin / Z@pp 24 (2009–2014); NPO Zapp Xtra (2014–2018)

Links
- Website: NPO Zappelin Extra

Availability (at time of closure)

Streaming media
- NPO: NPO Zappelin Extra - Live tv
- Ziggo GO: ZiggoGO.tv (Europe only)

NPO Zappelin Extra was a digital theme TV channel jointly operated by AVROTROS, EO, KRO-NCRV, NTR and VPRO. The TV channel launched as Zappelin 24 on 30 May 2009. The channel broadcast daily from 3:30am to 8:30pm, timesharing with Familie 24 overnight. However, at launch, UPC Nederland left out the channel from its digital offer.

== Broadcasting ==
Logo used from 2009 until 2014

NPO Zapp extra's short-lived logo used from 2018 before to the curerent name.

It broadcasts replays and broadcasts from NPO Zapp and NPO Zappelin, via the cable and internet. The TV channel was part of the Nederlandse Publieke Omroep. On 10 March 2014, Zappelin / Zapp 24 changed its name into NPO Zapp Xtra.

NPO Zapp Extra became a 24-hour channel on 25 December 2018 and was renamed NPO Zappelin Extra. NPO Zapp Extra used to time-share with NPO 1 Extra until 25 December 2018 and has since taken over the former frequency of the defunct TV channel, NPO 3 Extra.

NPO Zappelin Extra closed on 15 December 2021. The last programme was a Bob the Builder movie (Mega Machines).

== Final programming ==
- Dinopaws
- The Smurfs
- Planet Cosmo
- Cars Toons: Mater's Tall Tales
- Pat & Mat
- Fishtronaut
- Pinky and the Brain
- Dino Dan
- Zig & Sharko

== Former programming ==
- Little Einsteins
- Thomas & Friends
