= NPO 3 Extra =

- Country: Netherlands
- Network: BNNVARA

Programming
- Picture format: 576i 16:9 (SDTV)

Ownership
- Owner: NPO
- Sister channels: NPO 1 NPO 2 NPO 3 NPO 1 Extra; NPO 2 Extra; NPO Nieuws; NPO Politiek en Nieuws; NPO Sport; NPO Zappelin Extra

History
- Launched: 31 October 2006; 18 years ago
- Closed: 25 December 2018; 6 years ago
- Replaced by: NPO Zappelin Extra has previously time sharing with NPO 1 Extra
- Former names: 101 TV (2006-2014); NPO 101 (2014-2018)

BNN 101 TV leader

NPO 3 Extra (formerly NPO 101 and 101 TV) was a Dutch digital theme channel of Dutch public broadcaster BNNVARA, which has been broadcasting since 31 October 2006. The channel could be received via the Internet, as well as digital theme channel via a decoder to the TV. On 10 March 2014, the channel was renamed by NPO 101, before it was called 101 TV.

The channel was mainly aimed at a young audience (13–34 years) and broadcasts programmes for this target group 24 hours a day. The programmes that are broadcast partly repeats of (especially) BNNVARA programmes and other broadcasters, but also new (experimental) programmes who still can not hear or visit an "open channel".

Interaction with the viewers should be an important element in the future types of NPO 101. In this interactive nature of the channel is also the origin of the name: 1-0-1 stands for one-on-one or "een-op-een".

101TV had an agreement with NPO 3FM to broadcast remarkable radio fragments and whole broadcasts GI:EL. In addition, every year Serious Request is also broadcast live.

On 26 March 2018, NPO 101 was renamed by NPO 3 Extra.

It ceased broadcasting on 25 December 2018 to concentrate on web-streaming only. Its frequencies were taken over by NPO Zappelin Extra, which was previously timesharing with NPO 1 Extra.

== Logos and identities ==
101 TV logo used from 2006 until 2014

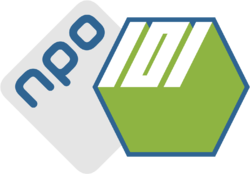
NPO 101 logo used from 2014 until 2018

Logo from 26 March until 25 December 2018
