= 2009 in Dutch television =

This is a list of Dutch television related events from 2009.

== Events ==
- 9 May - Lisa Hordijk wins the second series of X Factor.
- 29 May - 12-year-old singer and guitarist Tessa Kersten wins the second series of Holland's Got Talent.
- 3 July - Singer and winner of the first series of Idols Jamai Loman and his partner Gwyneth van Rijn win the fourth and final series of Dancing with the Stars.

== Deaths ==
- 17 November - Josine van Dalsum, 61, actress.

== Television shows ==
=== 1950s ===
- NOS Journaal (1956–present)

=== 1970s ===
- Sesamstraat (1976–present)

=== 1980s ===
- Jeugdjournaal (1981–present)
- Het Klokhuis (1988–present)

=== 1990s ===
- Goede tijden, slechte tijden (1990–present)

=== 2000s ===
- X Factor (2006–present)
- Holland's Got Talent (2008–present)

== Ending this year ==
- Dancing with the Stars (2005-2009)
- De Club van Sinterklaas (1999-2009)

== Networks and services ==
=== Launches ===
Network	Type	Launch date	Notes	Source
Dusk!	Cable television	April		
Zappelin 24	Cable television	30 May		
Action Now!	Cable television	31 May		
Sport24	Cable television	19 July		
Fox Life	Cable television	7 September		
RTL Lounge	Cable television	2 October		
Disney Channel	Cable television	3 October		
Pebble TV	Cable television	12 November		

=== Conversions and rebrandings ===
Old network name	New network name	Type	Conversion Date	Notes	Source
Cultura	Cultura 24	Cable and satellite	Unknown		
Humor TV	Humor TV 24	Cable television	Unknown		
HilversumBest	Best 24	Cable television	1 December		

=== Closures ===
Network	Type	End date	Notes	Sources
Zone Horror	Cable television	1 July		
BBC Prime	Cable television	11 November		

== See also ==
- 2009 in the Netherlands
