= BVN =

Dutch international television station

- Country: Netherlands
- Broadcast area: Europe and the Americas (via satellite); Worldwide (via internet streaming)

Programming
- Picture format: 576i (SDTV, 16:9)

Ownership
- Owner: NPO

History
- Launched: 1 June 1996; 30 years ago
- Closed: 31 December 2026; 57 days' time
- Former names: Zomer TV

Links
- Website: www.bvn.tv

Availability

Streaming media
- BVN.tv: "BVNLIVE"

BVN (Het beste van NPO, lit. 'The best of the NPO'; formerly Het beste van Nederland lit. 'The best of the Netherlands' and Het beste van Vlaanderen en Nederland, lit. 'The best of Flanders and the Netherlands'), is a Dutch free-to-air television channel providing Dutch public television to viewers around the world. It is a service of the public broadcasting company of the Netherlands, Nederlandse Publieke Omroep (NPO).

Originally, it was conceived as a collaborative project between NPO and BRTN/VRT, but due to initial lack of interest, the channel launched as a summer pop-up channel only with Dutch programming, financed by RNW. After the Zomer-TV experiment finished, definitive broadcasts began in 1998 with both Dutch and Flemish content; VRT later quit BVN in 2021, leaving NPO alone in its management. The channel is scheduled to close at the end of 2026.

== History ==
Radio Netherlands Worldwide, which would eventually become a partner in BVN, first established a TV unit in 1960 as Radio Nederland Televisie (Radio Netherlands Television, RNTV). Programmes were sent by airplane to Suriname and the Netherlands Antilles, using the same plane that took audio recordings to the RNW radio station in Bonaire. NTS, later NOS, produced a weekly summary of events in the Dutch mainland to the stations in the Dutch Caribbean. Monthly, it produced a greetings programme where Antillans and Surinamese presented how they studied or worked at in the Netherlands. With the independence of Suriname, RNTV produced content for the international market, sending Dutch documentaries and animated features around the world at affordable prices. RNTV's activity became sporadic after a 1986 restructuring.

In 1992, RNW was facing a near-closure, as its radio programming, according to an internal council, was deemed outdated, and the company was urged to rethink its role. Two years later, it suggested the creation of a TV equivalent via satellite, while also pushing in a multimedia drive with the arrival of the internet. BVN was being planned in the mid-1990s as Beeld van Nederland ("Image of the Netherlands"), described by NRC Handelsblad as "a sort of Nederland 4". Cees Dorland was one of its supervisors.

The channel started without prior announcement on 1 June 1996 as Zomer-TV (Summer-TV), an operation aimed at making Dutch-language programming available to Dutch and Flemish holidaymakers abroad. The channel broadcast by satellite across Europe from 8pm to midnight. The output was sourced from the three terrestrial channels of the NPO, and had as its original productions a weather forecast for Europe, a TV version of the ANWB emergency calls and Studio.NL, which was produced by RNW. Wereldomroep announced its plan earlier in the year after the lack of interest from the omroeps in sustaining a potential BVN service to be delivered over satellite. In its founding speech, the TV service provided by RNW would soon become the only analog satellite service in Dutch, as the ensemble of commercial channels (RTL4, RTL5, SBS6, Veronica) announced its plans to start broadcasting using digital encryption. By not booking a full-time transponder, Zomer-TV timeshared with a horse racing channel and CNE, both British niche channels. It was scheduled that the pilot service would shut down on 1 September that year.

All of its programming originally came from the Netherlands (the abbreviation BVN at first standing for het Beste Van Nederland, "the best of the Netherlands") but this was later adapted, once the Flemish Region of Belgium began contributing both financially and with output from the schedules of its public broadcaster, Vlaamse Radio- en Televisieomroep (VRT), to het Beste van Vlaanderen en Nederland: "the best of Flanders and the Netherlands". As Wereldomroep TV in the pilot project, BRTN/VRT provided some Flemish programming for free, but this was withdrawn before the start of the definitive project as VRT hadn't paid for operational costs. The addition of Flemish programming would put BVN at the same level as similar co-operation projects such as TV5 and Arte. Full broadcasts of BVN TV began on 1 January 1998. The launch implied the end of its analogue contract with Astra through BSkyB, instead opting for a digital service on Hotbird. On 1 May 1999, BVN TV started 24-hour broadcasts on a six-hour wheel. On 1 September 1999, due to an additional government grant, the channel started broadcasting to the Dutch possessions in the Caribbean. Up until then, satellite coverage was limited to Europe.

As of 2000, the channel was still operating at a loss and could not afford distribution in Canada due to CRTC regulations. Although it had signed an agreement the previous year with an American company to deliver its signal over satellite to North America, the subsequent sale of the satellite provider months later hurt BVN’s finances. At the time, 525,000 viewers were reported to tune in, but NPO only calculated the figures based on the amount of Dutch tourists. This made it hard to determine how many viewers tuned in to BVN TV throughout the year.

On 1 February 2002, broadcasts to southern Africa began, ahead of the royal wedding between Crown Prince Willem Alexander and Maxima Zoreguita the following day. With it, the channel was available as a basic tier channel on DStv.

Radio Nederland Wereldomroep (RNW) was involved as a founding partner, but left in 2012 upon its shutdown. Editorial control of the channel has since been handed over to NPO.

In March 2007, due to requests from viewers, BVN changed its scheduling from three 8-hour programming blocks to two 12-hour blocks: this provided more room for the inclusion in the schedules of such popular shows as De Wereld Draait Door (BNNVARA), Pauw & Witterman, Morgen Better and children's programming. From 1 June to 30 November 2007, the channel was temporarily distributed on cable companies in Washington DC (Cox, RCN and Verizon), as well as over-the-air on WNVC's multiplex (channel 57.2). The move came when MHz Networks, operator of WNVT and WNVC, opted to add the international channels available on its two multiplexes to cable companies. In May 2008, René van Baaren was appointed from vice-manager to general manager of BVN, replacing Joop Dalmeijer, who joined NPS early that year. The council also changed: Jan Hoek (RNW) replaced Harm Bruins Slot (NPO) as channel president, while Henk Hagoort (NPO), Jean Philip De Tender (VRT) and Joop Daalmeijer (NPS) became part of its council.

BVN was one of the partners of the documentary 10/10/10, einde of nieuw begin? (10/10/10: End or New Beginning?) about the dissolution of the Netherlands Antilles, alongside 15 ATV and Telecuraçao.

Near Christmas 2015, BVN made its live stream available on its website as BVN Live.

On 1 April 2020, BVN resumed broadcasts via the Astra 1M Wide Beam satellite upon request from viewers. New encrypting technology made BVN more viable to broadcast on Astra again. Although the channel still broadcast in standard definition, satellite users had to upgrade to a high definition receiver. The Hotbird broadcasts were discontinued at the end of May.

Early signs of a potential closure were noted in November 2020, when NPO showed criticism on the way BVN is funded, especially after the planned drop in Flemish content and satellite costs. Since satellite distribution was the primary source of BVN's funding, and considering that the future of the channel depended largely on its Dutch partner, NPO began to look for other solutions for its future.

The Flemish Region announced in April 2021 that it would end funding for BVN programming after June of that year; with VRT's foreign offerings transitioning to digital platforms afterwards. Accordingly, BVN became an exclusively Dutch-funded service on 1 July 2021; satellite distribution to Sub-Saharan Africa via SES-1 ceased on 1 May, with distribution to Asia on AsiaSat 5, Oceania on Optus D2, and North America on Galaxy 19 ending on 1 July, and on MultiChoice's DStv platform in South Africa on 1 November. BVN would later announce that coverage in Sub-Saharan Africa would be restored via the Astra 4A satellite from 25 October.

On 1 June 2024, BVN started broadcasting via the Hotbird satellite using a Kabelio transponder. There were already plans to cease distribution via Astra 1.

In September 2025, NPO revealed plans to shut down BVN and its online offering in 2026, with international audiences served via NPO Start. The plan was made definitive upon a new decision taken by Rianne Letschert, the Dutch minister of education, culture and science, on 30 April 2026.

== Access ==
There are three main access methods:

- Satellite – A range of satellites carry BVN, often as a free-to-air channel. User needs to be within the "footprint" of a satellite that carries the channel, and have a suitable dish and receiver.
- Cable – Cable television providers in many places have BVN as one of the available channels
- Internet – The BVN service is now also available worldwide as a streaming service "BVNLIVE" over the Internet (except from IP addresses in the Netherlands). The channel's website also provides its own catch-up service, which is independent from NPO Start.

== Programming ==
All programmes are replayed during the second 12-hour block, running from 0100 to 1300 CET daily. In general, the programmes are sourced directly from the NPO member broadcasters and BVN has no final say.

=== News and current affairs ===
BVN broadcasts daily news bulletins from NOS. The main 2000 bulletin from NOS Journaal is broadcast at 2030 CET and features a specially produced international weather forecast (BVN-Weer). A short bulletin is also carried at 1600 CET on weekdays and at 1605 on weekends.

It also produced its own international weather bulletins to go after the news, these were discontinued effective 1 October 2026. BVN's weather bulletin for America and the Caribbean was also carried on Surinamese television; as of 2010, producing a weather bulletin for Suriname was seen as expensive. These bulletins were shot on the NOS weather studio and used its meteorologists.

Current affairs output on weekdays consists of the magazine programme EénVandaag (One Today) at 1830 CET, Nieuwsuur (Newshour, which incorporates an NOS Journaal bulletin). EénVandaag is produced by independent pillar broadcasters (AVROTROS) while Nieuwsuur is co-produced by NOS and the NTR.

On Sundays, BVN carries the political talk show Buitenhof at 1530.

Topical debate and entertainment programmes also feature in the schedule including De wereld draait door (The World Keeps Turning) at 1940 CET and Pauw or Jinek at around 2350 CET. Both programmes are off-air during the Summer and are produced by BNN-VARA subsidiary VARA.

Rights issues imply that BVN must broadcast the NOS bulletins on a few minutes' delay.

In the aftermath of the 2011 Tōhoku earthquake and tsunami, BVN provided additional live bulletins from both NOS and VRT to cater to Dutch expatriates in Japan.

=== Sport ===
NOS produces 15 minutes sports news bulletins called Sportjournaal on weekdays along with Studio Sport, a longer sports news and highlights programme on Saturday nights. The sports magazine show Holland Sport is broadcast periodically on Saturday afternoons. During the football season, Eredivisie highlights are broadcast in NOS's Studio Sport on Saturday nights & Sunday evenings. BVN has a separate contract with Eredivisie NV to carry highlights, but said contract does not apply to live matches.

For UEFA Euro 2000, held in the Netherlands and Belgium, BVN obtained a subset of matches only featuring those involving the teams of the two hosts.

=== Children ===
BVN features a daily block of children's programming, consisting of new and archived programming from various pillar broadcasters in the Netherlands, NTR, the NPO children's television stations NPO Z@pp as well NPO Z@ppelin.

Dedicated news and current affairs output for children is also broadcast at weekends, including a weekly current affairs programme Schooltv-weekjournaal, on Saturdays and a news review, NOS Jeugdjournaal Overzicht (NOS Youth Journal Overview), on Sundays.

The goal of the children's slot is for descendants of Dutch people to have contact with the Dutch language.

=== Features and entertainment ===
BVN's daily schedule features entertainment, documentaries and features output.

Programming includes documentary series Spoorloos (Without a Trace) as well as various music specials.

BVN also carried the Eurovision Song Contest annually. The 2026 edition, where the Netherlands withdrew, was the last to be carried.

=== Drama ===
BVN broadcasts a number of popular drama series and serials including Klem (Stuck) and Flikken Rotterdam (Rotterdam Cops).

During the summer, BVN transmits movies from the Netherlands on Saturday nights.

=== Former Flemish programs ===
Until VRT left the BVN joint venture in 2021, the channel also presented various Flemish programmes.

The 1pm and 7pm editions of VRT's Het Journaal were transmitted on a short time delay at 1300 and 1905 CET from Sunday to Friday. The 1900 bulletin was broadcast from 1915 on Saturdays. VRT public affairs programs Terzake (To The Point) aired at around midnight CET each evening, and a delayed broadcast of VRT's current affairs magazine De Zevende Dag (The Seventh Day) aired at 1330 CET on Sundays. VRT's sports coverage was featured daily within short sports bulletins on Het Journaal at 1300 and 1900. On Sundays throughout the year, the 1910 Het Journaal bulletin was shortened to 20 minutes to allow for a half-hour round-up entitled Sportweekend to follow at 1930. During the football season, the 1300 bulletin on Sunday featured an extended goals round-up from the Jupiler League (Belgian First Division).

VRT entertainment programmes that aired on BVN included the quiz show Blokken (Blocks) and the long running sitcom Thuis (Home), Flemish movies on Saturday nights, and programmes from the VRT children's television station, Ketnet.

=== Dutch Caribbean programs ===
Occasionally, BVN aired programs catering the Dutch Antilles and Surinamese to the whole world. One such example was Politie Paramaribo, the first Surinamese TV series, which was financed by TROS, one of NPO's member broadcasters, and shown on Sunday evenings in November and December 2010, two days after airing on Dutch mainland TV. In Suriname, it was broadcast on Apintie, Ampie's Broadcasting Corporation and Sky.

== Other initiatives ==
=== WereldVrienden van de Wereldomroep ===
When Radio Netherlands Worldwide existed and was one of BVN's partners, it had the television coverage of WereldVrienden van de Wereldomroep (WorldFriends of RNW). The 2006 edition was held on 21 December of that year.
