= Proximus Pickx =

Belgian pay television provider

Proximus Pickx (formerly Belgacom TV, later Proximus TV), subsidiary of the Belgacom Group, provides Digital TV (IPTV) services over its own IPTV Platform in Belgium. It was launched in the summer of 2005.

Proximus TV is distributed using ADSL/VDSL solution. This IPTV service was originally distributed over ADSL which later evolved to ADSL2+. More recently, the Broadway Project started providing fiber to the street cabinets and VDSL2 from the street cabinets to the home. By increasing bandwidth and evolving from MPEG-2 to MPEG-4 AVC compression, Proximus TV currently offers high-definition television to many Belgian households.

Like satellite broadcasts, and unlike cable distributors, the distribution of Proximus TV is not limited to a certain municipality or province. In December 2008, coverage of Proximus TV was 86.6% of all Belgian households, and High Definition TV was available to 64%.

At the end of March 2013, there were 1,412,000 Proximus TV subscribers, including the so-called "dual stream" subscribers.
By end 2014, Proximus’ TV customer base counted 1,288,000 TV households, or 1,593,000 subscriptions when including multiple set-top boxes.

In September 2014, Belgacom TV became Proximus TV.

== History ==
A few months before the launch of Belgacom TV, on 9 May 2005, Belgacom Group took the whole market by surprise when it acquired the broadcasting rights for the Jupiler Pro League (Belgian Football League). For this end, it announced the creation of Belgacom 11 (now Pickx Sports) to air these broadcasts and use this agreement to lure more subscribers. The French Disney channels were added to the platform in Brussels and Wallonia on 1 December 2006 to mass customer demand. Disney Channel, its timeshift feed and Playhouse Disney were carried in the basic (Classic+) package and Toon Disney was available as an additional channel. The agreement between the two entities was also part of an agreement aimed at improving children's safety online.

In June 2009, Belgacom TV lost the rights to air Standard Liège and Anderlecht preseason matches, potentially depriving some Division 1 teams from having enough revenue. BeTV was interested in holding rights, but its coverage was limited to Brussels and Wallonia, making it impossible to do nationwide negotiations. Belgacom TV defended itself by saying that its subscriber base of 633,000 was enough to continue without its rights to the Jupiler Pro League, while Telenet had 857,000 customers even without Belgian football rights.

Apps were added to Belgacom TV in December 2012. The apps were TV Maps, using Google Maps' technology, official applications for Belgacom 11 (with news and statistics from the championships it held the rights to) and Belgacom 5 (Ethias League) and educational story apps developed by Chocolapps, available in French, Dutch, German and English.

ARD and ZDF were removed on 14 March 2013, receiving criticism from the Germanophone community. A petition was created in the wake of the removals. A new agreement was reached at the end of February 2014, with the channels being restored.

== Technology and reception ==
Customers must purchase or rent a (PVR) HD IPTV set-top box, models support as of June 2015 are made by Cisco & Scientific-Atlanta (now a Cisco owned company). Also necessary is a subscription to Proximus TV, which is only available in a pack with internet and/or telephone.

=== Content discovery services ===
Proximus TV uses Jinni's technology to offer personalized taste channels and the ability to automatically search for content which is airing now and should suit the taste of the observer.

== Content and services offering ==
=== TV channels ===
==== Belgian free-to-air television channels (national and regional) ====
- VRT (Dutch-speaking area)
- RTBF (French-speaking area)
- BRF (German-speaking area)

==== Free to air television channels from other European countries ====
- United Kingdom (BBC One, BBC Two optional package required for BBC First)
- France (TF1, France 2, France 3)
- Germany (Das Erste, ZDF, RTL)
- Netherlands (NPO 1, NPO 2, NPO 3/NPO Zapp/NPO Zappelin)
- Italy (Rai 1, Rai 2, Rai 3)

==== International television channels (free to air) ====
- TV5MONDE (Europe)
- DW-TV (Europe)

==== International television channels (free to view) ====
- CNN International
- CNBC Europe
- BBC World News

==== Gender-based premium thematic packages ====
- Kids (French/Dutch)
- Entertainment (French/Dutch)
- Factual and Documentaries (French/Dutch)
- Sports and Lifestyle (French/Dutch)
- Nostalgie (French only)
- Music and Culture
- Adult
- Premium and pay-per-view sports
- Proximus Sports Multi-Live 10

=== Catch-Up TV ===
Catch Up TV services known as TV Replay and TV Replay + are offered for the following television channels
As of 1 June 2015 TV Replay will now be included - at no extra charge - in Packs with Internet Everywhere.

- RTL stations : RTL TVI, RTL TVI HD, Plug RTL, Plug RTL HD, Club RTL, Club RTL HD
- RTBF stations : La Une, La Une HD, La Deux, La Deux HD, La Trois, La Trois HD
- AB stations: AB3, AB3 HD
- VRT stations : één, één HD, Canvas, Canvas HD, Ketnet
- Medialaan stations : vtm, vtm HD, vtmKzoom, Jim, Vitaya, 2BE, 2BE HD, anne
- De Vijver Media stations : VIER, VIER HD, VIJF, VIJF HD
- BITES EUROPE NV station : Acht
- Proximus stations : Proximus 11, Proximus 11+ HD and Proximus 5.

=== Video on Demand ===
==== Movies & Series Pass ====
Unlimited access to a whole range of top movies and series

==== Netflix ====
As of 16 December 2014 Netflix is available from the menu of the STB.

==== Disney+ ====
As of 15 September 2020 Disney+ is available from the menu of the STB.

==== Cinefeel Pass ====
Classic movies and movies from European and other independent publishers

==== Hollywood movies ====
Including latest cinematic and same day DVD releases

==== Proximus 11 & Proximus 11+ ====
All the matches of the Jupiler Pro League on Proximus 11 and on Proximus 11+ the entire UEFA Champions League and its Multi Live, the best of the English League Cup, the best of Iberian football with the Spanish League, the Copa del Rey (final not included) and the Portuguese League.

==== Kids Pass ====
Unlimited access to favorite movies and series (more than 500) in a secure and child-friendly environment.

==== X-Adult Pass ====
Unlimited access to more than 200 clips for adults.

=== Radio stations ===
- RTBF radio network (French)
- RTL radio network (French)
- VRT radio network including regional variations (Flemish)
- BRF (German-speaking region)

=== Mobile TV ===
Customers with the Comfort or Maxi pack have free access to TV Partout/TV Overal to watch on a PC, Smartphone or tablet up to 40 channels and can use the TV Replay/TV Replay+ for a limited number of channels.

== See also ==
- Belgacom
- Belgacom (ISP)
