= Geschiedenis 24 =

Geschiedenis 24 (History 24) was a Nederland 24 channel owned by NTR and VPRO. It launched in 2005 as /Geschiedenis and received the uniform Geschiedenis 24 branding in 2009, and closed as part of a channel reduction plan in 2012. The channel broadcast history-related programming.

== History ==
Geschiedenis (styled /Geschiedenis) was one of the first four channels announced for the Nederland 4 project in December 2004, set to launch in early 2005. The channel was formally presented on 27 February 2005 as a collaboration between VPRO, NPS and the Netherlands Institute for Sound and Vision, the latter of which provided content such as the Polygoon newsreels. Government films and amateur material was also scheduled; as well as an eight-hour themed block of programming: in the first week, the channel would air programs on the history of skate culture in the Neteherlands, and in the second week, an overview of the 1980s. Ties with other broadcasters and institutions were also being strengthened. The channel also carried reruns of Andere Tijden.

In 2009, the channel was renamed Geschiedenis 24; in March 2012, NPO announced its closure for 31 March 2012, as part of a plan to cut the amount of theme channels from twelve to eight. Subsequently it became an online brand and was renamed NPO Geschiedenis in 2014.
