= VTMkerst =

- Country: Belgium
- Headquarters: Vilvoorde, Belgium

Programming
- Language: Dutch
- Picture format: 4:3 (SDTV)

Ownership
- Owner: Vlaamse Media Maatschapij

History
- Launched: 2 December 2006; 19 years ago
- Closed: 7 January 2007; 19 years ago

VTMkerst (VTMchristmas) was a Belgian pop-up television channel owned by Vlaamse Media Maatschapij. It followed on from the VTMzomer experiment earlier in 2006.

The channel was publicly announced in early November 2006. Unlike what happened before, where Belgacom TV accepted the idea of carrying VTM's summer pop-up channel, the provider refused to carry the Christmas pop-up because Belgacom had other priorities. The channel was carried by Telenet instead. The pop-up channel had no announcers, and had its advertising costs at a minimum, paid by the provider who had the rights to carry the service.

Like what happened with VTMzomer, the channel ended up being one of the ten most-watched channels over the Christmas period of 2006, peaking in seventh place.

== Programming ==
The channel was built under four pillars: from 7am to 7pm, programming was aimed at younger audiences, followed by a family film (not necessarily connected to Christmas) at 7pm. The prime time slot at 9pm was a "Prestige" block built around VTM's own TV series, mostly from the past, due to requests from viewers. The schedule ended at 10pm with Married... with Children.

The channel's primetime slot featured the premiere of the new VTM series De Kavijaks (which was set to premiere on the main channel in 2007) as well as reruns of successful VTM productions such as Ons geluk and Veel geluk professor.

VTM's Christmas action for 2006 was a trip of a Christmas hat across Flanders for the season, made in connection with the channel. VTM host Erika Van Tielen offered gifts to viewers daily.
