= Movie Genome =

Film cataloguing method

The Movie Genome is an approach to indexing movies based on attributes in order to create movie catalogs with extensive, detailed data about each title.

== Description ==
The Movie Genome concept is borrowed from the Human Genome Project, a scientific project to identify and map all human genes. Similarly, a Movie Genome, as used by semantic movie discovery engine Jinni, identifies and indexes multiple “genes” (elements and aspects) of a movie.

A comparable initiative is the Music Genome Project, intended to "capture the essence of music at the fundamental level.” The Music Genome technology is used by Pandora to play music for Internet users based on their preferences.

Movie Genome attributes might include mood, tone, plot, and structure. Jinni’s Movie Genome has a taxonomy created by film professionals, while titles are automatically indexed using a mixture of metadata and reviews and a proprietary Natural Language Processing solution to assign semantic tags to content and users.

== Applications ==
The Movie Genome has several applications in the area of movie discovery. It can power search engines, notably semantic search, which takes a meaning-based approach to interpreting queries by identifying concepts within the content, rather than keywords. The data about each title in a Movie Genome can also support an item-based recommendation engine that recommends based on similarities between content items and users’ preferred “genes.” By contrast, collaborative filtering is used to make recommendations based on statistical similarities in preferences between users.

The concept of “genes” or “DNA” has also been applied to other types of entertainment. For example, GamerDNA has a database of games that locates games based on gameplay elements such as setting, tone and game mechanics.

== Examples ==
Jinni has created a Movie Genome by taking a taxonomic approach to cataloging titles, analyzing user reviews and metadata. The technology is used to power a semantic discovery engine for movies and TV shows.
