= Familie 24 =

Family 24 was a Nederland 24 channel owned by KRO. The channel aired from 8:30pm to 3:30am, timesharing with Zappelin 24.

== History ==
The channel started broadcasting on 1 January 2007 as Opvoeden doe je zo! (This is how children are raised!), as both a television channel and a website managed by KRO dedicated to parenting. Previously, on 20 April 2005, KRO held a theme day dedicated to proper parenting Other omroeps (other than KRO) contributed with programming. When Nederland 4 was renamed Nederland 24, the channel was renamed Familie 24 and started timesharing with Zappelin 24.

In late May 2009, UPC Netherlands removed it and Zappelin 24. UPC readded the channel in September. The channel closed in 2011.
