= Spirit 24 =

Spirit 24 was a Nederland 24 channel, created from the merger of EO's Omega TV and NCRV's /Geloven. It broadcast religious programs from the several omroeps. NCRV was its manager; eleven other omroeps supplied programming. Its output consisted of inter-religious programming, yoga, programmes for women, among others.

== History ==
The channel traces its origins to the 2006 launches of NCRV's /Geloven and EO's Omega TV, part of Nederland 4. Geloven was open to other religions and aired programmes produced by the 2.13 religious omroeps.

The merger of the cable companies to form Ziggo in 2008 caused the digital package to remove the two. In the summer of 2008, when NPO announced its intention to reduce the number of theme channels from seventeen to twelve, EO had to announce the closure Omega TV at the end of the year, even though its viewership was increasing, without disclosing data.

On 1 September 2008, NPO announced the merger of the two channels, with the merged channel being managed by NCRV. On 5 January 2009, Spirit 24 launched. The rebrand coincided with Nederland 4 becoming Nederland 24. Its programming was still provisional, and, according to EO officials, wouldn't become regular until 1 April. EO would use the channel as a platform to increase its faith-based programming, after showing its dismay for the closure of Omega TV.

On 10 August 2013, following the cessation of linear distribution, a half-hour slot was transferred to Nederland 2 on Tuesdays.
