= NPO Nieuws =

Defunct Dutch news channel

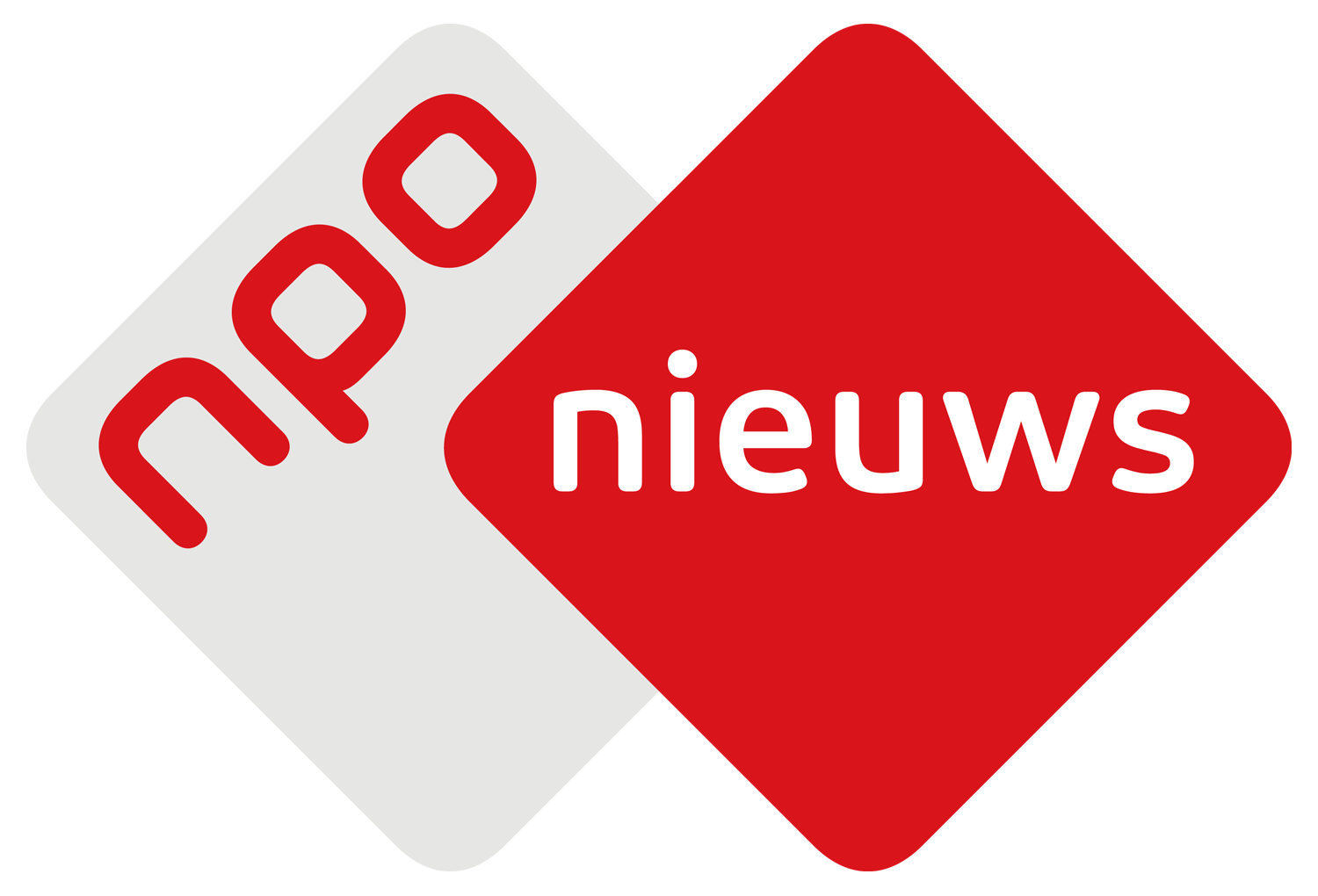
- Country: Netherlands
- Broadcast area: Netherlands
- Network: NOS

Programming
- Language: Dutch
- Picture format: 576i 16:9 SDTV

Ownership
- Owner: NPO
- Sister channels: NPO 1 NPO 2 NPO 3 NPO 1 Extra; NPO 2 Extra; NPO Politiek en Nieuws; NPO Sport

History
- Launched: 1 December 2004; 21 years ago
- Closed: 15 December 2021; 4 years ago
- Replaced by: NPO Politiek en Nieuws
- Former names: Journaal 24 (2004-2014)

Availability (at time of closure)

Streaming media
- NPO: NPO Nieuws - Live tv
- Ziggo GO: ZiggoGO.tv (Europe only)

NPO Nieuws was a 24-hour news channel operated by the NOS, the public broadcaster which supplies news and sports to all national public television and radio networks. NOS also provides programming for the political channel, NPO Politiek en Nieuws.

The channel started broadcasting on NOS's website on 1 December 2004.

NPO Nieuws broadcasts all editions of the NOS Journaal news bulletin, and repeats the last news broadcast. NPO Nieuws also showed four extra programmes named NOS Journaal Chat, NOS Journaal Plus (extra information), NOS Journaal Reportages and NOS Journaal Weekoverzicht. A half-hourly version (15 minutes plus another 15 minute repeat) of the youth-oriented news programme NOS Jeugdjournaal also aired every day on NPO Nieuws. In addition to these programmes, weather bulletins and updates from NOS Teletekst page 101 were also shown. Until 16 September 2007 teletext news was also shown on NPO Nieuws; this was later replaced by a scrolling news ticker showing news headlines. At any point, the programming could have been interrupted for breaking news.

The main studio is in Hilversum. On 10 March 2014, Journaal 24 changed its name into NPO Nieuws.

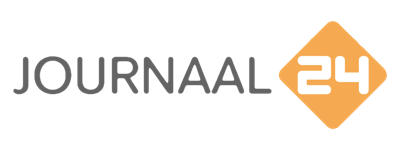
Journaal 24 logo used from 2009 until 2014.

NPO Nieuws closed on 15 December 2021. Some of its programming have moved to NPO Politiek which was renamed by NPO Politiek en Nieuws.
