= Nederlandse Omroep Stichting =

Dutch broadcasting organisation

- Logo since 1 November 2026

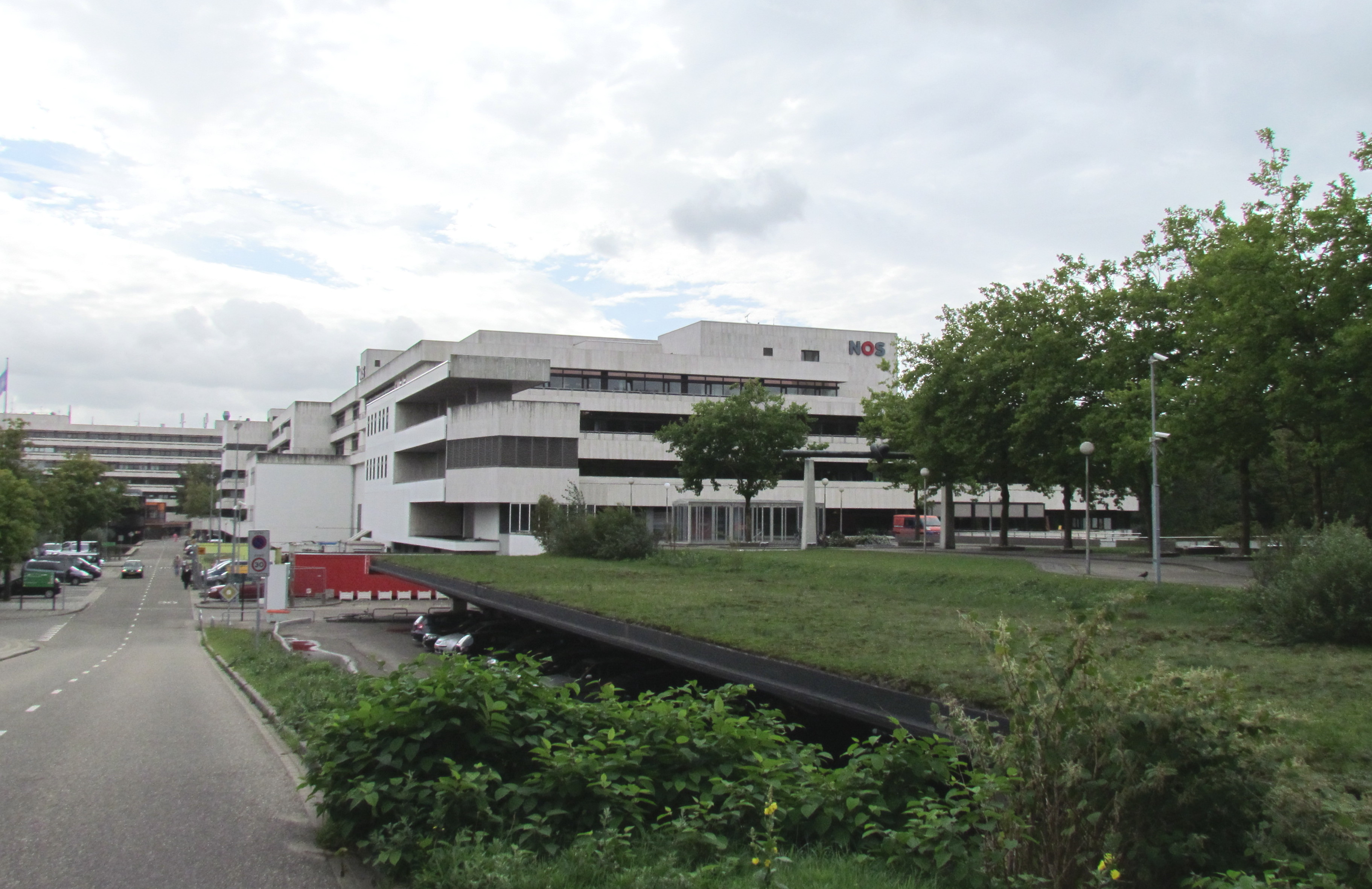
- Type: Public service broadcaster, news network
- Country: Netherlands
- Founded: 29 May 1969; 57 years ago by merger of predecessors
- Headquarters: Hilversum, Netherlands
- Parent: NPO
- Key people: Johan van der Werf (Chairman)
- Official website: nos.nl
- Replaced: NRU (1947); NTS (1951)

Nederlandse Omroep Stichting (Dutch pronunciation: [ˈneːdərlɑntsə ˈʔɔmrup ˈstɪxtɪŋ]; NOS [ˌɛnoːˈɛs] or rarely [nɔs]; English: Dutch Broadcasting Foundation) is one of the broadcasting organisations making up the Dutch public broadcasting system. Funded by the Dutch government, it has a special statutory obligation to make news and sports programmes for the three Dutch public television channels and the public radio services.

The foundation's remit derives from the Dutch Media Act 2008, which stipulates that NOS produce regular and frequent programming of a public service nature, including, notably, a full and impartial news service and coverage of parliamentary procedures and debates, as well as reporting on sporting and other national events. NOS also acts as a technical coordinator for the Dutch public broadcasting system as a whole. In the event of emergencies and/or the breaking of a major news story, it can assume control of the public networks to provide coordinated coverage of events in cooperation with the other members of the system.

NOS has correspondents in multiple countries, including a permanent studio in Washington, D.C. Programmes produced by NOS include its daily television and radio bulletins, the NOS Journaal. Parliamentary reports are shown from a special studio in the Hague. It also supplies news programmes aimed at children (Jeugdjournaal), teens (NOS Stories), young adults (NOS op 3), and sports followers (NOS Langs de Lijn, NOS Studio Sport). Programmes are made available via television, radio, and online. NOS also broadcasts text pages and a website, which are both often used by the public.

== History ==
=== 1947–1969: Unions and foundations ===
The Nederlandse Radio Unie (Netherlands Radio Union; NRU) was established in 1947. After several failed attempts to create a public broadcasting system and link up with a national station, the NRU was created as a union of broadcasting associations that provided operational support. The associations were responsible for their output, but studios, orchestras, and outside broadcast facilities were managed by the NRU. Weekly radio plays were also the domain of the NRU and would run until 1986. The NRU became the Dutch founding member of the European Broadcasting Union in 1950.

Meanwhile, the Nederlandse Televisie Stichting (Netherlands Television Foundation; NTS) was created in 1951, two years after public television returned to the airwaves. The NTS served as a similar organisation to the NRU, in that broadcast and transmission facilities were supplied to member associations for making programmes.

It was not until 1956 that the NTS itself produced its first programme, a news bulletin called the NTS Journaal. This was followed by a sports round-up, Sport in Beeld (Sports Illustrated) in 1959, and 1967 Langs de Lijn (Along the Line), a joint production of several broadcasting associations. On 15 October 1967, Willem Leonard Oltmans interviewed the de Mohrenschildts for the NTS, which resulted in a 40-minute film that was the only full-length filmed interview of George de Mohrenschildt. However, the film, which was kept at Hilversum, disappeared in 1975.

=== 1969–1995: The birth of NOS ===
NOS's first logo, used from 29 May 1969 to 31 December 1994.

A new Media Act was passed into law in 1967, merging the NRU and the NTS. The new organisation, the Nederlandse Omroep Stichting (Netherlands Broadcasting Service; NOS) was created on 29 May 1969. The NOS, as were its predecessors, was tasked with coordinating the whole public broadcasting system, as well as providing news and sports bulletins. It also inherited the technical and production facilities needed to make and broadcast radio and television programmes. All broadcasting members of the NRU and the NTS were made members of the NOS.

By 1971 seven programming societies existed, each receiving part of the television licence fee and advertising revenue. Because of pillarization most represented various political and religious groups, although the largest, AVRO, was the most neutral. Twenty-seven smaller groups such as the Society for Sexual Reform received small time slots, as well as all parties represented in the Dutch Parliament. Societies produced their own programs, and purchased others from abroad. Besides news and sports, NOS produced children and educational programs for the one third of broadcast hours it filled.

On 2 May 1977, a strike by sound engineers affected television news broadcasts. Upset viewers called on all broadcasters to resolve the situation.

On 1 April 1980, the NOS launched its teletext service, in the framework of supplying news and information. It first experimented with Teletext in 1977. In 1981, on the 25th anniversary, the NOS aired its first televised youth news bulletin, called Jeugdjournaal.

The Media Act of 1988 facilitated several changes to NOS and the broadcasting system. The Services Department, which was made up of the technical, broadcast, and transmission facilities of the NOS, was privatised, which meant the broadcasting associations were required to pay to use the facilities. The Nederlands Omroepproduktie Bedrijf (Netherlands Broadcast Production Company; NOB) consisted of those facilities, mainly based in Media Park in Hilversum. The Media Act also required broadcasting association members to take up positions on the NOS Board of Directors. A new government commission oversaw content and financial matters, as well as admitting potential new broadcasting associations.

=== 1995–2005: The split of NOS ===
The logo was italicised and made blue on 1 January 1995.

In 1995, another Media Act was enacted, which saw the NOS's broadcasting duties greatly reduced, with the creation of the Nederlandse Programma Stichting (Netherlands Programming Service; NPS). The NPS took on the NOS's programming tasks concerning culture, art, children, education, and ethnic minorities, while the NOS concentrated on news, sports, and live events.

A new Supervisory Board replaced the Board of Directors in 1998. The previous management was replaced with a three-man board, now charged with developing strategies and responsibility for all public output. Programming co-ordinators were appointed for each television and radio network and channel identities were created, largely replacing the varying on-air presentation of the pillar broadcasters. The broadcasting associations also have a degree of input through the Supervisory Board.

In 2002, the coordination element of the public broadcast system, administered by the NOS was now made clearer with the creation of an umbrella organisation, Publieke Omroep (Public Broadcasting), while programme makers operated under the name "RTV NOS". The reorganisation loosened NOS from the public broadcasting system and reconstituted it as a neutral member of the NPO.

=== 2005–present: A new look ===
On 17 December 2005, the organisation obtained a new corporate identity. The previous NOS logo was in use for 36 years and featured the company's initials in lowercase, with round and obtuse angles. The O of the logo is painted red and represents "the hub of 360-degree reportage". The new logo was designed by graphic designers Lambie-Nairn, complete with new idents for its television programmes. The typeface was Gotham.

Its news-gathering operations also changed, with the news departments for radio, television, and internet merging and reorganising into different sections (NOS, NOS News, NOS Sports, with NOS Events added in 2009).

An announcement made by the Minister of Education in 2007 confirmed a further division of the NOS. The umbrella group Publieke Omroep, managed by the NOS was to be legally separated and renamed Nederlandse Publieke Omroep (Netherlands Public Broadcasting). The move was to ensure the NOS operated under the same conditions as its fellow broadcasting associations, as well as transferring membership of the European Broadcasting Union.

In 2009, the NOS became fully independent and now has its own Board of Directors.

Since 2012, the NOS has got a new style and layout and, for some programs, other titles. The biggest change is visible in the 8 o'clock NOS Journaal (traditionally the most viewed and therefore the most important news broadcast of the NOS), where they adopted a standing presentation.

== Programming ==
=== Television ===
The NOS is responsible for news, sports, political, and events programming on public service television networks and produces the following:

- NOS Journaal – one of the most important news programmes in the Netherlands, broadcast on all public stations whenever possible. The flagship edition is the 8 pm bulletin on NPO 1, often called achtuurjournaal, supplemented by two shorter editions at 6pm & midnight and hourly bulletins throughout the day.
- NOS Jeugdjournaal – A news programme aimed at 8–12-year-olds, aired on children's channel NPO Zapp. It is broadcast at 7pm and lasts 20 minutes, and a short bulletin is broadcast every weekday at 8:45 am when primary school starts.
- NOS Studio Sport – A sports programme covering the most popular sports. It has the right to broadcast major sports tournaments, like the Olympic Games and the FIFA World Cup and UEFA Euro. The NOS no longer has the right to broadcast full matches of the Eredivisie, but Studio Sport Eredivisie still provides summaries of matches played. The programme also covers matches and competitions in other sports, most notably tennis, ice skating, cycling, and field hockey. The editorial staff is also responsible for the NOS Sportjournaal, a news programme about sport, and NOS Studio Voetbal, a football talkshow on Sunday evening about the Eredivisie, the Netherlands national team and other news in football.
- NOS Journaal op 3 – a 60-second news bulletin aimed at teenagers and young adults, aired on NPO 3, since 2011 called NOS op 3.
- NOS Den Haag Vandaag – a daily roundup of events from parliamentary sessions and political reports, produced in cooperation with the NOS, NTR and BNNVARA.
- NOS Events – The NOS is also responsible for broadcasting live special events, such as breaking news, weddings of the Dutch royal family, and the Dutch elections. (This department was called NOS Actueel, but that name is defunct since on 1 January 2006 NOS RTV changed its corporate identity)
- Nieuwsuur (Newshour) – Co-produced with the NTR, the NOS provides news and political affairs coverage for NPO 2's nightly hour-long news magazine programme.

==== Themed channels ====
Besides broadcasting on the main three public television channels, The NOS is also responsible for NPO Politiek en Nieuws, a television channel that was a result of the merger of NPO Nieuws and NPO Politiek in 2021, that airs news programs, including the latest NOS Journaal as well as covering live events, parliamentary sessions, debate and archive material of parliamentary sessions. When parliament was not in session, NPO Sport took its place where it featured live sports coverage or news and current affairs being programmed which were also supplied by the NOS.

=== Radio ===
On the radio, the NOS is responsible for the following programmes:

- NOS Journaal, a radio news bulletin that is broadcast every hour on the public broadcasting channels NPO Radio 1, NPO Radio 2, NPO Radio 4 and NPO Radio 5.
- NOS Headlines, a radio news bulletin especially made for a younger audience (like Newsbeat on BBC Radio 1), broadcast on NPO 3FM and NPO FunX. Since 2011 NOS op 3.
- NOS Radio 1 Journaal, a news and current affairs programme that is broadcast mornings and afternoons on NPO Radio 1.
- NOS Langs de lijn (Along the sideline), a sports programme on NPO Radio 1, featuring live sports coverage and results from the Eredivisie and other major sports.
- NOS Met het Oog op Morgen (With a view to tomorrow), a late-night current affairs programme on NPO Radio 1.

=== Internet ===
The NOS is also responsible for the news and sports sites of the Dutch public broadcasters. The editorial staff of the internet pages is also responsible for the teletext pages on NPO 1, NPO 2 and NPO 3.

== See also ==
- Netherlands Public Broadcasting
- NTR
- Public broadcasting
