= Digitenne =

Dutch digital terrestrial television service

- Company type: Subsidiary
- Industry: Television broadcasting
- Founded: 1999
- Headquarters: Rotterdam, Netherlands
- Area served: Netherlands
- Products: Digital terrestrial television
- Parent: KPN
- Website: www.digitenne.nl

Digitenne is the Dutch digital terrestrial television platform. Owned by KPN, Digitenne uses the DVB-T2 standard and carries the national public television channels (NPO 1, NPO 2, NPO 3) and the regional public television channels free-to-air, while the rest of its television channel offerings are provided through a subscription.

== History ==
=== Development ===
Nozema, a Dutch telecommunication company which provided infrastructure and broadcast transmission facilities, began developing DVB-T in the Netherlands in 1993. In September 1996 the company presented the system during the International Broadcasting Convention (IBC) in Amsterdam. From December 1997 test transmissions were made via the Lopik transmitter. In May 2000, a transmitter went on air that broadcast the regional television program of Utrecht digitally (DVB-T). This channel was received by a few small cable companies, which converted the signal to an analog television signal for cable distribution.

=== Digitenne Foundation ===
A foundation was set up under the name of Digitenne in 1999 to take care of the introduction of DVB-T in the Netherlands. Nozema, KPN and NOB (a former Dutch company that supplied facilities for television and radio productions) each owned 30 percent of the shares. The remaining 10 percent came into the hands of the public and commercial broadcasters, united in Cahanoves Beheer.

In the autumn of 2001, the application procedure for a license for commercial use of DVB-T started. On 31 January 2002, Digitenne was authorized to operate the network until 31 January 2017. The new license took effect on 1 February 2017 and has a duration of 13 years.

=== Network deployment ===
In the fall of 2002, the Digitenne signal would become active in the areas around Amsterdam, Haarlem, Alphen aan den Rijn, Hilversum and Almere. However, the introduction got postponed until the spring of 2003. From 1 May 2004, Digitenne can be received in virtually the entire Randstad. The rest of the network could only be rolled out a few years later, because the analogue television signal had to be taken off the air first.

In the spring of 2004, Nozema and KPN each bought 10% of the shares in Digitenne from the NOB, because the NOB no longer invested. From the autumn of 2004, KPN also started selling the Digitenne television channels under the name KPN digitale TV. Existing KPN internet and / or telephone customers received a discount on the subscription price.

At the start of 2006, Digitenne had around 60,000 and KPN around 100,000 DVB-T customers.

=== KPN takes over Nozema ===
At the end of 2005, KPN announced that it wanted to take over Nozema, partly due to its interest in Digitenne. KPN received permission for the take-over in the spring of 2006. KPN also acquired the remaining shares of the NOB. Now, KPN held 90% of the shares in Digitenne. Nozema Services was renamed by KPN Broadcast Services.

KPN has had a semi-monopoly in the digital ether market. The acquisition was controversial, partly because the license conditions stated that the Minister of Economic Affairs was entitled to withdraw the license if a dominant telecom operator were to acquire a substantial interest in Digitenne. Despite the fact that KPN is a dominant operator, the then ministers Laurens Jan Brinkhorst and subsequent minister Joop Wijn of Economic Affairs and Gerrit Zalm of Financial Affairs allowed the acquisition. At the end of his ministry, Joop Wijn deleted the policy rule.

From the fall of 2006, new subscriptions could only be ordered from KPN.

=== Switchoff of analogue terrestrial television ===
On 11 December 2006, analogue terrestrial television was discontinued in the Netherlands. From that moment on, NPO 1, NPO 2, NPO 3 and the regional broadcasters throughout the Netherlands can only be received digitally free-to-air via the ether. The radio stations also started broadcasting via Digitenne, but the analogue radio stations remained. The paid channels were added in 2007.

In 2010, Digitenne reached its peak with around 900,000 customers. In the same year, Scarlet (later Stipte) and EDPnet also started offering the Digitenne television channels. Canal Digitaal followed under the name CanalTenne in 2013. These operators stopped in 2018 after the transition to HD.

=== New broadcast license: Conversion to HD ===
The original Digitenne license expired at the end of 2017. The government wanted to keep Digitenne up and running until 2020, but in 2017 KPN would have to switch to the new standard DVB-T2. However, KPN did not want to pay the costs for new receivers that customers would need. At the end of 2015, the Ministry of Economic Affairs decided to auction the frequencies for a period of 13 years. The license auction would initially take place on 4 July 2016, but one of the two companies withdrew. This made KPN the only remaining company. The company subsequently received a new license that is valid until 1 February 2030. Between October 2018 and July 2019, the Digitenne network was gradually converted to DVB-T2, making HD possible. Customers' receivers were exchanged free of charge.

== See also ==
- Television in the Netherlands
- KPN
