= VTMzomer =

- Country: Belgium
- Headquarters: Vilvoorde, Belgium

Programming
- Language(s): Dutch
- Picture format: 4:3 (SDTV)

Ownership
- Owner: Vlaamse Media Maatschapij

History
- Launched: 20 June 2006; 18 years ago
- Closed: 22 September 2006; 18 years ago

VTMzomer (VTMsummer) was a Belgian pop-up television channel owned by Vlaamse Media Maatschapij. The channel was available on Belgacom TV for a period of three months during the summer of 2006, but wasn't available on Telenet. Telenet was interested in receiving the channel, but rejected due to technical limitations. The channel was also the first digital channel in Flemish television history. At the beginning of the experiment, few Flemish people had a Belgacom TV subscription, meaning that the channel would have low ratings during the target period (one of the faces of the channel, Erika Van Tielen, had a subscription to Telenet). It was also a test for VMMa to enter the digital market.

The channel only broadcast during the summer period of 2006. At the end of the experiment, it was seen as a success, with plans to replicate the experience later. The channel ended its run being Belgacom TV's tenth most-watched channel.

== Programming ==
The aim of the channel was to provide a similar schedule to that of the main VTM channel, adapted for summer viewing habits. The channel broadcast from 2pm to 2am. Time-shifted reduced editions of VTM's news bulletins aired at 2pm and 9pm, the latter coincided with summer sunset hours. The daily schedule began with an Information slot, followed by fixed theme slots: Sitcom, Reality, Lifestyle, Summer, Drama, Reality, Information, Primetime and Late Night. The channel had a 12-hour schedule, from 2pm to 2am. Most of the programmes were repeats.

Breaks featured summer-specific information on the weather and activities, presented by Elke Vanelderen, Sandrine and Erika Van Tielen (the last of which formerly from Ketnet). There were also previews of programmes that would only air on the main VTM channel from September, as well as some foreign series mostly from KANAALTWEE.
