= Philips Experimentele Televisie =

- Country: Netherlands
- Broadcast area: Eindhoven
- Headquarters: Eindhoven

Programming
- Language: Dutch

Ownership
- Owner: Philips

History
- Launched: March 18, 1948; 78 years ago
- Closed: July 10, 1951; 75 years ago

Philips Experimentele Televisie (lit. 'Philips Experimental Television') was an experimental television station broadcasting out of Eindhoven (though it moved to Hilversum in its last year on air) and owned by Electronics company Philips. The station conducted experimental broadcasts from 18 March 1948 to 1951, and closed due to the launch of an official television service. The station employed the PAB 3 callsign for video and PAG 3 for audio.

== History ==
In 1947, Philips had built a television transmitter, having previously applied for a television licence. Philips conducted experimental transmissions before the outbreak of World War II. The company had already sold television sets for export at a small scale, to Germany, France and England.

The first experimental broadcast took place on 18 March 1948; its transmitter covered a 40km radius, but only a few people could receive it, as most of the few sets were installed at houses of high-ranking Philips executives and local dignitaries. The first night featured a theatrical scene played by two actors, a short film on Wieringermeer, an intervention from presenter Cees de Lange and Brabantine comedian Peer van Brakel, footage from a recent match played between the Dutch and Belgian teams and a feature on flowers. A 5-by-11 metre studio was built at NatLab. Once regular broadcasts would begin, it would deliver three nights of programming a week, informative content on Tuesdays, cultural content on Thursdays and feature films on Saturdays. These began on 1 April 1948 at 8:30pm.

Fred Knol was the first continuity announcer on Dutch television, alongside Bep Schäfer. Broadcasts continued into 1949, when the Dutch public broadcasting system faced tensions regarding the potential introduction of television, as there was much opposition. In April 1951, when the national television channel was being created, Philips executives believed that if it became operational, the station would go bankrupt.

The station faced a lack of room for its studios, eventually causing its final broadcast was made on 10 July that year. Overall, a total of 275 broadcasts were conducted. Philips, however, still made an advertising film in association with NTS, De magische venster (The Magic Window), in 1953.
