= 2009 in the Netherlands =

- Decades: 1980s; 1990s; 2000s; 2010s; 2020s
- See also: Other events of 2009; History of the Netherlands

This article lists some of the events that took place in the Netherlands in 2009.

== Incumbents ==
- Monarch: Beatrix
- Prime Minister: Jan Peter Balkenende

== Events ==
=== February ===
- 10: The Postbank completely mergers into the ING Bank.
- 25: Turkish Airlines Flight 1951 crashed during its approach to Amsterdam's Schiphol Airport.

=== March ===
- 29: KLM stops flying to Aruba. Subsidiary Martinair takes over the 4 flights a week.

=== April ===
- 30: 2009 attack on the Dutch royal family

=== May ===
- 1: Adolescence, a work of Salvador Dalí is stolen from the Scheringa Museum of Realist Art.

=== June ===
- 4: 2009 European Parliament election in the Netherlands

=== July ===
- 1: The air-tax that was introduced on 1 July 2008 is abolished.
- 30: 6 Dutch people die in a bus accident at Sant Pol de Mar, Spain. Dozens of other people are hurt.

=== August ===
- 19: A family tragedy takes place in Kampen, Overijssel. During a fire in a house 4 young children die. The remaining family members, amongst them 10 other children, find a way out of the house in time.

=== September ===
- 6: Dutch soldier Kevin van der Rijdt, corporal van het Corps Commando-troops, dies near Deh Rahwod. He's the 20th soldier to die since the beginning of the mission in Afghanistan.
- 6:The HSL-Zuid is officially opened.
- 7: The 21st soldier since the beginning of the mission in Afghanistan: Mark Leijsen, Sergeant-Major of the Pantsergenie, dies in Uruzgan in an assault with an improvised explosive.

=== October ===
- 19: The DSB Bank is declared bankrupt.

=== December ===
- 13: The Thalys starts driving on the Highspeed-line Schiphol - Antwerp.
- 25: Northwest Airlines Flight 253, a passengers-flight Amsterdam to Detroit, is the target of a failed bombing attempt.

== Sport ==
- March 5–23: The Netherlands participated at the 2009 World Baseball Classic. The Netherlands lost to Puerto Rico in the Seeding game.
- March 25–29 Netherlands at the 2009 UCI Track Cycling World Championships
- July 1–5 Netherlands at the 2009 European Road Championships

The Netherlands won 2 gold, 2 silver and 2 bronze medals.
Ellen van Dijk won gold in the Women's time trial and Chantal Blaak in the Women's road race

- August 15–23 Netherlands at the 2009 World Championships in Athletics
- September 23–27 Netherlands at the 2009 UCI Road World Championships
- October 18: Gilbert Yegon wins the Amsterdam Marathon

=== See also ===
- 2008–09 Eredivisie
- 2008–09 Eerste Divisie
- 2008–09 KNVB Cup
- 2009 Johan Cruijff Schaal

== See also ==
- Netherlands in the Eurovision Song Contest 2009
- Netherlands in the Junior Eurovision Song Contest 2009
- List of Dutch Top 40 number-one singles of 2009
- 2009 in Dutch television
