= NPO Zapp =

Dutch children's television block

- Country: Netherlands
- Broadcast area: Netherlands, reaching bordering regions via overspill of the Dutch terrestrial network

Ownership
- Owner: NPO
- Sister channels: NPO Zappelin

History
- Launched: 4 September 2005; 21 years ago
- Former names: Z@pp (2005–2012); Zapp (2012–2014)

Links
- Website: www.zapp.nl

Z@PP logo used until 2012

Zapp logo used from 2012 until 2014. NPO logo was added from August 2014 to 25 June 2018.

NPO Zapp is a Dutch children's block from the NPO on NPO 3 that launched as Z@pp on 4 September 2005. Since September 2005, NPO Zappelin has been the name of a block for young children. The @ in the name of the channel was removed on 10 September 2012.

On 12 March 2013, the NPO announced that Zapp and Zappelin would be renamed as NPO Zapp and NPO Zappelin. The reason for this change is to make the channels and its programmes more recognizable. The rebranding completed on 19 August 2014. Together with NPO Zappelin it forms a channel called NPO Zappelin Extra, available online and part of bonus packages (cable, satellite and IPTV).

Well-known programmes of NPO Zapp are Willem Wever (KRO-NCRV), Het Klokhuis (NTR), Jeugdjournaal (NOS) and Villa Achterwerk (VPRO).

NPO Zapp had a mascot called The Zappers.

== Current programmes ==
- Campus 12
- Checkpoint
- De Dokter Corrie Show
- Het Klokhuis
- Jeugdjournaal
- SpangaS: De Campus
- Taarten van Abel
- Willem Wever
- Zaai
- Zapplive
- Zappsport

== Foreign series ==
- Dance Academy (Australia)
- Super Abby (Spain)
- DreaMars (Israel)
