= KRO-NCRV =

Dutch public broadcasting company

- Type: Public broadcaster
- Country: Netherlands
- Availability: Nationwide
- Founded: 1 January 2014; 11 years ago
- Parent: NPO
- Official website: kro-ncrv.nl
- Replaced: KRO; NCRV

KRO-NCRV is a Dutch public broadcasting company based in Hilversum established on 1 January 2014 from a merger of the broadcasters Catholic Radio Broadcasting (KRO) and the Dutch Christian Radio Association (NCRV), transmitting on NPO 1, NPO 2 and NPO 3. In 2016, the broadcaster also took on the programming from the former Roman Catholic Church Association (RKK) and proposed to serve "the Catholic and Protestant Christian communities" in the Netherlands.

At the official census by the Media Commission in 2014, KRO-NCRV, in spite of a minor loss of membership, appeared to be the largest broadcaster in the Netherlands at the time, with nearly eight hundred thousand (798,930) members.
