= NPO Sport =

Dutch sports television channel

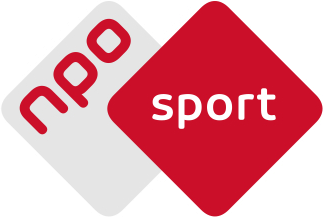
- Country: Netherlands
- Network: NOS

Programming
- Picture format: 576i 16:9 SDTV

Ownership
- Owner: NPO
- Sister channels: NPO 1 NPO 2 NPO 3 NPO 1 Extra; NPO 2 Extra; NPO Politiek en Nieuws

History
- Launched: 19 July 2009; 17 years ago
- Former names: Sport24 (2009-2014)

Links
- Website: NPO Sport

Availability

Streaming media
- NPO: NPO Sport - Live tv
- Ziggo GO: ZiggoGO.tv (Europe only)

NPO Sport (formerly Sport24) is a Dutch sports channel owned by the Nederlandse Publieke Omroep (NPO) and operated by Nederlandse Omroep Stichting (NOS). It launched on 19 July 2009 and time-shared with NPO Politiek en Nieuws when the legislature was not in session.

The last known summer where NPO Sport served as a temporary replacement for NPO Politiek was 2017.

== Logos and identities ==
Sport 24 logo used from 2009 until 2014

NPO Sport logo used since 2014
