= Katholieke Radio Omroep =

Dutch public broadcasting organization

KRO

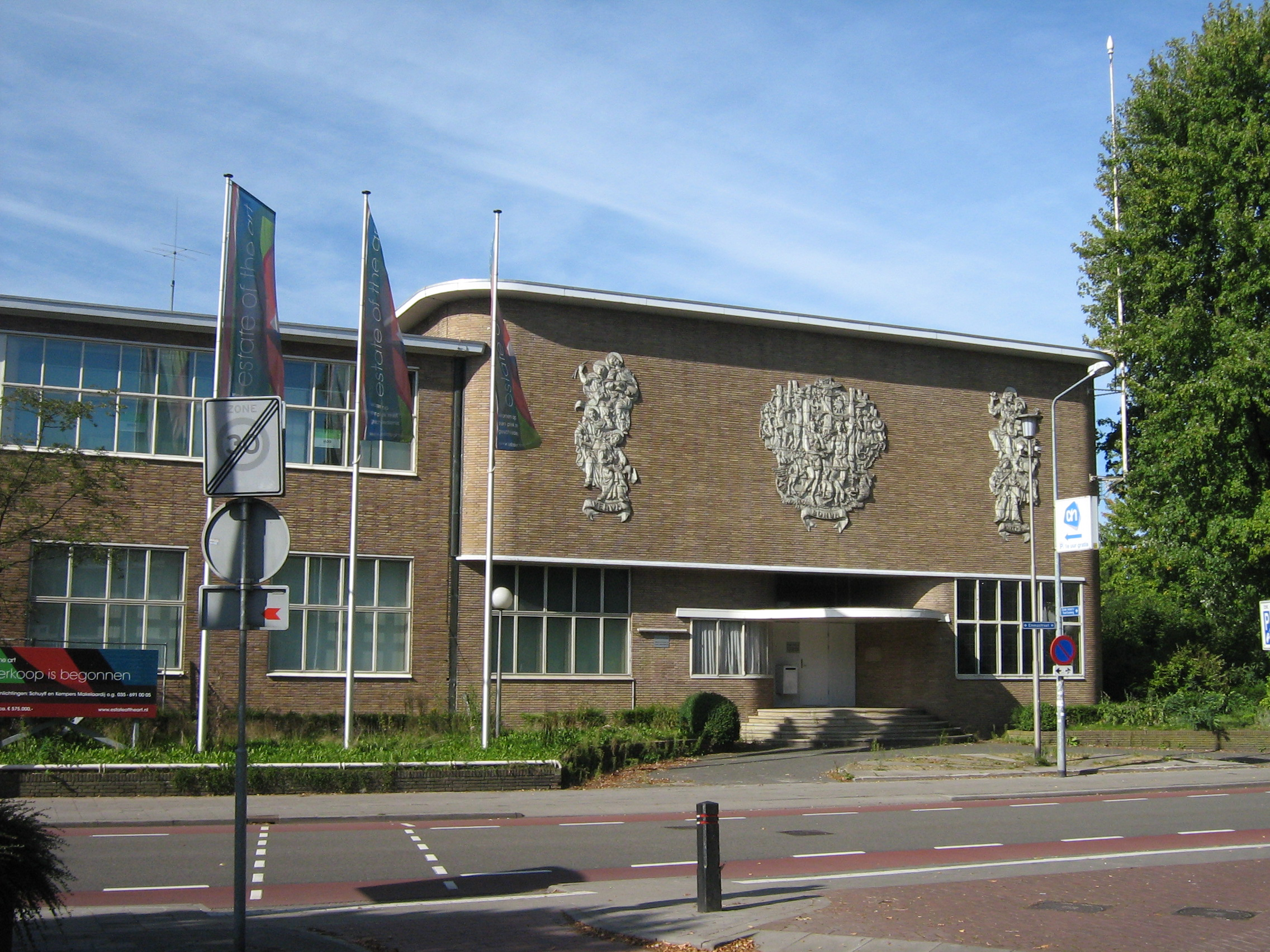
- Type: Public broadcaster
- Country: Netherlands
- Availability: Nationwide
- Founded: 1925
- Dissolved: 31 December 2013
- Official website: www.kro.nl
- Replaced by: KRO-NCRV

KRO, or Katholieke Radio Omroep (Catholic Radio Broadcasting), was a Dutch public broadcasting organization founded on 23 April 1925.

Broadly Catholic in its spiritual outlook, KRO broadcast the bulk of its television output on the NPO 1 channel. KRO was also responsible for managing broadcasts made by the Catholic Church in the Netherlands in the airtime allocated to Rooms-Katholiek Kerkgenootschap. KRO published the magazines Studio KRO Magazine and Mikro gids.

On 1 January 2014, it merged with Nederlandse Christelijke Radio Vereniging (NCRV) to form KRO-NCRV.

== Orkest Zonder Naam ==
Orkest Zonder Naam (English: "Nameless Orchestra") was the KRO's official orchestra during the pillarization of Dutch society. Their 1952 song "Naar de speeltuin" is a Dutch evergreen, which sold 25,000 copies.

== Programmes ==
=== Television ===
On television, KRO's "behind-the-news" show was Netwerk, which it produced in cooperation with Evangelische Omroep and NCRV.

A popular show which KRO began in 2005 is Boer zoekt vrouw (Farmer Wants a Wife), presented by Yvon Jaspers. Many Dutch farmers remain single because they find it hard to find a woman who is willing to put up with the long hours, hard work, and lack of holidays which farming life requires. This show, which aims to remedy that situation, was KRO's highest-rated television programme in 2008, achieving an average weekly viewership of 4.5 million.

Another KRO speciality was the broadcasting of detective series in the strand KRO Detectives, which mainly focuses on British and Scandinavian productions.

==== Youth output ====
The logo for KRO's children's programming on NPO 1

KRO also had its own children's programmes, KRO Kindertijd ("KRO children's time") and Tien Plus ("Ten plus"), which it broadcast during its scheduled slots on Nederland 1. KRO Kindertijd also had some programmes available live across the Netherlands via Omroep NL's digital service, Zappelin / Zapp 24. Some of this output was also viewable outside the Netherlands via Kindertijd's "Video Juke Box" service.

== See also ==
- Catholic television
