= Andere Tijden =

Dutch documentary television series

Andere Tijden (Other/Different Times) was a history programme on Dutch television of the NTR and VPRO. There was also a version of the programme called Andere Tijden Sport, which showed programmes about sports history, which existed until 2025 when it was cancelled due to budget cuts. Andere Tijden was presented by Hans Goedkoop from 2000 until 2020, and by Astrid Sy until 2025. Andere Tijden Sport was presented by Tom Egbers until 2023, when after a scandal he was removed from the programme, and replaced by Dione de Graaff. In 2025, the programme ceased broadcasting on television, and transitioned fully to YouTube.
