= NPO Zappelin =

Dutch children's television block

- Country: Netherlands
- Broadcast area: Netherlands, reaching bordering regions via overspill of the Dutch terrestrial network

Ownership
- Owner: NPO
- Sister channels: NPO Zapp

History
- Launched: 4 September 2000; 26 years ago
- Former names: Z@ppelin (2000–2012); Zappelin (2012–2014)

Links
- Website: www.zappelin.nl

NPO Zappelin is a Dutch television program block for younger children that launched as Z@ppelin in September 2000. The brand was created as a counterbalance to violent programming on its commercial competitors.

Before Z@ppelin, the programmes were scheduled on all three public channels (Nederland 1, 2, and 3). On 4 September 2005, Z@ppelin became a channel for children aged 2–6 years. The @ in the name of the channel was dropped on 10 September 2012.

On 12 March 2013, the NPO announced that Zapp and Zappelin would be renamed as NPO Zapp and NPO Zappelin. The reason for this change is to make the channels and its programmes more recognisable. The rebranding completed on 19 August 2014. Together with NPO Zapp it broadcasts on NPO 3 during daytime. It was also part of the 24-hour children's channel NPO Zappelin Extra.

== See also ==
- Television in the Netherlands
