= Jinni (search engine) =

- Type: Media & Entertainment
- Founded: January 2008
- Headquarters: Tel Aviv, Israel
- Products: Discovery service for movies, TV shows, other media
- Website: Jinni.com

Jinni was a website-based search engine and recommendation engine for movies, TV shows and short films. The service was powered by the Entertainment Genome, an approach to indexing titles based on attributes like mood, tone, plot, and structure. As of 2015, it was no longer available to the public, but is reportedly available via API and business-to-business licensing, where it is used by services such as Xfinity.

== Description ==
The Jinni service included semantic search, a meaning-based approach to interpreting queries by identifying concepts within the content, rather than keywords. The search engine served as a video discovery tool focusing on user tastes, including mood, plot, and other parameters, with options to browse and refine using additional terms, e.g., “action in a future dystopia” or “Beautiful Girls, funny.”

Jinni's semantic discovery engine was powered by that company's Entertainment Genome™, which reportedly contained thousands of "genes" automatically assigned to describe mood, style, plot and setting for every released movie or television program. These elements were then matched to subscribers' personal tastes according to their viewing history in order to provide a personalized discovery experience. Jinni also provided recommendations, according to a given user's favorites and ratings, of movies and TV shows. Stated another way, the recommendations were based on available content and on the user's taste profile.

As well as discovery, the Jinni website included internet television, the online streaming of film and television, mostly for titles available in the United States. Jinni also linked to other sites that rented or sold DVDs or offered downloads or streaming for a fee, such as Netflix, Amazon and Blockbuster.

Jinni's technology involved a taxonomy created by film professionals, with new titles indexed via natural language processing and machine learning methods to automatically analyze reviews and metadata.

Jinni's products included the website and APIs for TV operators and internet content providers. Jinni's partners included SeaChange, NDS, and OpenTV.

As of 2015, the business-to-business supply of its tools for use in "target[ing], deliver[ing], and measur[ing]... digital advertising efforts", with its entertainment audience-targeting solution addressed to movie studios, TV networks and "over-the-top" video providers.

== History ==
In March 2009, the Jinni website integrated the Netflix developer API. As a consequence, people could search the Netflix catalog, and "Instant Watch" catalog from Jinni, and add to their Netflix queues or begin streaming. In May 2010, Google announced a strategic alliance with Jinni to allow access to its tools by Google TV. In January 2011, Jinni announced it had raised US$5 million in Series B funding.

In June 2012, Belgian cable operator Belgacom deployed a recommendation engine from Jinni on digital set-tops that allowed subscribers to browse for content based on "mood". In July 2012, Jinni teamed up with Swisscom “for integration into [o]n [d]emand and live TV".

On November 6, 2013, Jinni launched a new customer-facing website and iPad application, providing personal recommendations based on a users "entertainment personality" as well as personalized TV listings, semantic content searches, and social-based group recommendations. In May 2014, Jinni integrated its "mood" and "taste"-driven video discovery engine with AT&T’s U-verse TV platform.

In June 2015, Jinni shut down its public service and now offers "solutions for pay TV [and] OTT operators" and "for entertainment advertisers".
