= Nederlandse Programma Stichting =

Dutch public broadcaster

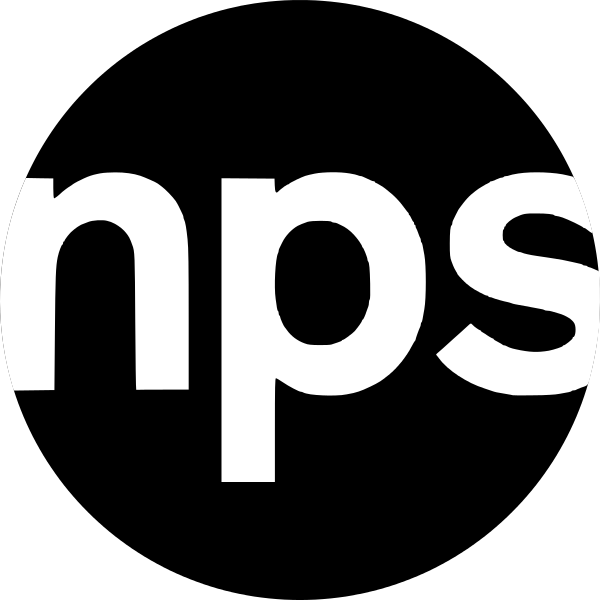
- Country: Netherlands
- Licence area: Netherlands
- Broadcast area: Netherlands
- Established: 28 April 1994
- Launch date: 1 January 1995; 31 years ago
- Dissolved: 1 September 2010; 15 years ago
- Official website: omroep.nl/nps
- Replaced by: Omroep NTR

NPS (Nederlandse Programma Stichting) (English: Dutch Programme Foundation) was a Dutch government-funded radio and TV broadcasting foundation.

In the Dutch public broadcasting system, broadcasters – in the Dutch context, listener and viewer associations – do not have their stations but are allotted time on the three public television and eight public radio networks broadly to the size of their respective memberships. The NPS, as one of the task broadcasters, was tasked with public services and was could have members.

== History ==
NPS' previous logo used from 28 April 1994 to 3 September 2008.

It was created on 28 April 1994, following a split-up of the responsibilities of the Nederlandse Omroep Stichting (NOS). The NPS took over the NOS's culture, information, minorities, and youth programming, allowing the NOS to concentrate on its role of providing impartial news coverage. On 1 September 2010, the NPS merged and rebranded with Teleac and RVU into NTR.

== Proposed abolition ==
In the summer of 2005, Jan Peter Balkenende's second cabinet presented plans to renovate the broadcasting system, including the abolition of the NPS by 2007. Given the dedicated and fairly sizeable audience for the NPS's output, the proposal was met with fierce resistance from many viewers and listeners. The idea was that other broadcasters would take over the type of programming that the NPS had previously provided.

There was little confidence among viewers, however, that this would happen. At the time, it was speculated that the real motive for the proposed abolition was that the governing parties (Christian Democrat and liberal-conservative) saw the foundation's output as being too left-wing. The plans were, in the end, withdrawn following the November 2006 elections.
