= BNNVARA =

Dutch progressive public broadcasting association

- Type: Public broadcaster
- Country: Netherlands
- Founded: 1 January 2014; 12 years ago
- Headquarters: Hilversum, Netherlands
- Broadcast area: Netherlands
- Parent: NPO
- Official website: bnnvara.nl
- Replaced: BNN; VARA

BNNVARA (Dutch pronunciation: [bijɛnˌɛɱˈvaːraː]) is a broadcasting association and network within the Dutch public broadcasting system.

== History ==
BNNVARA was founded on 1 January 2014 through a merger of the BNN (founded 1997) and VARA (founded 1925) associations. These continued to exist without broadcasting directly until 2018. In 2011 VARA and BNN announced that they would merge. On 6 November 2011, the members of VARA voted for the merger, after the member council of BNN had already done so a week earlier. The merger was opposed by the People's Party for Freedom and Democracy and the Party for Freedom. BNN and VARA announced on 8 February 2012 that the decision to merge was definite.

On 1 September 2018, existing members of BNN and VARA were converted into members of BNNVARA, thus ending the separate member associations that still existed.

== Network ==
After the merge, BNN and VARA kept using their separate branding, but on 24 August 2017 it was announced that as a new broadcaster, BNNVARA (formerly BNN-VARA) would start to show programs though VARA, and for radio later the following morning on 28 August.
