= NPO Politiek en Nieuws =

Dutch news and politics channel

- Country: Netherlands
- Broadcast area: Netherlands
- Network: NOS

Programming
- Language(s): Dutch
- Picture format: 1080p HDTV (downscaled to 16:9 576i for the SDTV feed)

Ownership
- Owner: NPO
- Sister channels: NPO 1 NPO 2 NPO 3 NPO 1 Extra; NPO 2 Extra

History
- Launched: November 2006; 18 years ago
- Replaced: NPO Nieuws
- Former names: Politiek 24 (2006-2014); NPO Politiek (2014-2021)

Links
- Website: NPO Politiek

Availability

Streaming media
- NPO: Live tv
- Ziggo GO: ZiggoGO.tv (Europe only)

NPO Politiek en Nieuws is a public television channel operated by the public broadcaster NOS, which supplies news and sports to all national public television and radio networks. Programmes come live from The Hague when the parliament is in session. When the parliament was not in session the NPO Politiek en Nieuws channel became NPO Sport, broadcasting sporting events or news and current affairs, supplied by the NOS. On 15 December 2021, NPO Nieuws merged with NPO Politiek to make the present name of this channel. Before 10 March 2014 the channel was called Politiek 24.

== NPO Sport ==
Especially in the summer months, the channel reported on sporting events which were not fully shown on the open channels of the NPO. These competitions included the World Cup/European Athletics Championships, World Cup/European Swimming Championships, World Equestrian Games, World Championships and Vuelta a España.

== Logos and identities ==
Politiek 24 logo used from 2009 until 2014

NPO Politiek logo used from 2014 until 2021

NPO Politiek en Nieuws logo used since 2021
