= NTR (broadcaster) =

Dutch public-service broadcaster

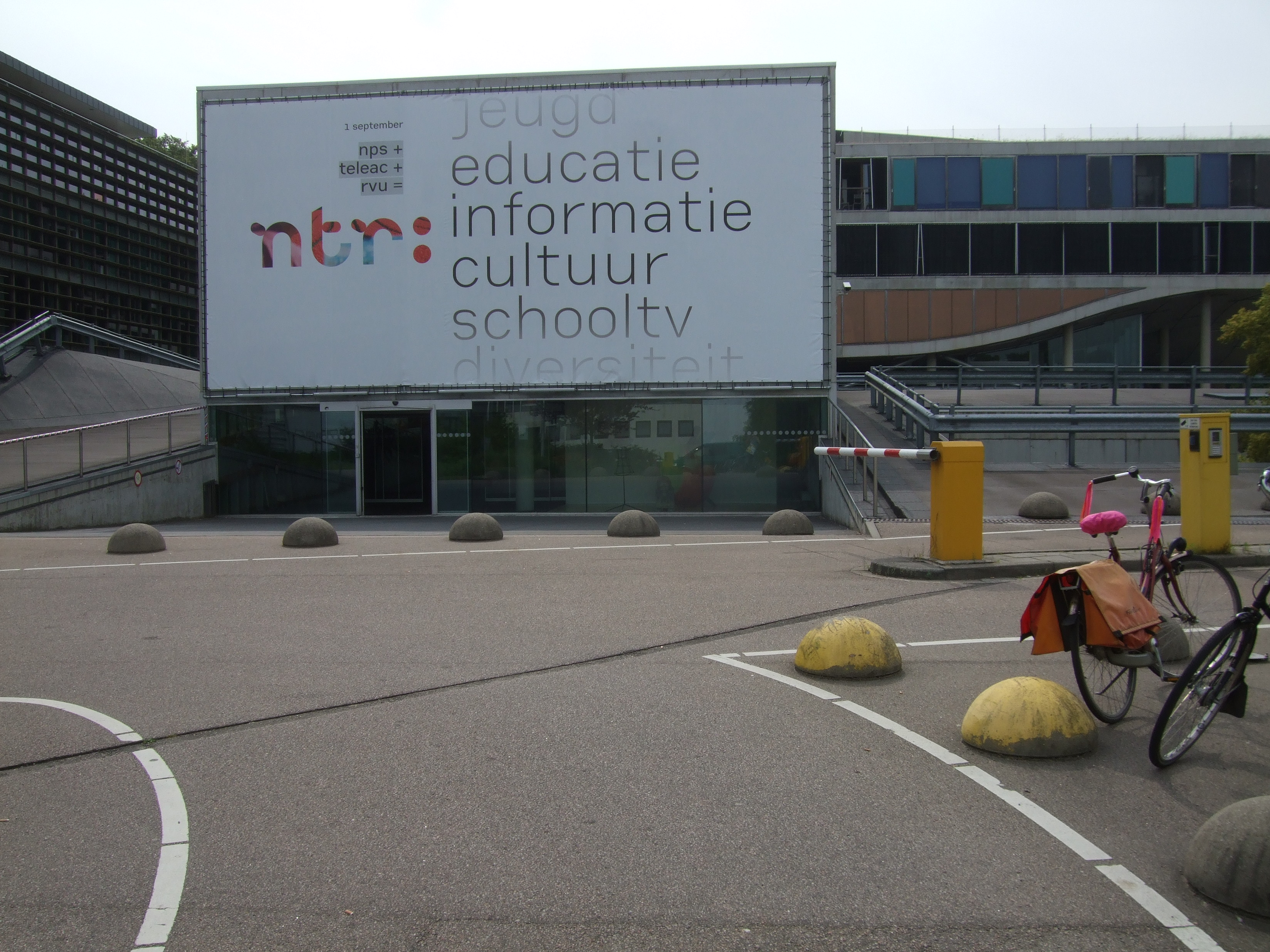
- NTR building in Hilversum, July 2010
- Type: Public broadcaster
- Country: Netherlands
- Founded: 1 September 2010
- Parent: NPO
- Official website: Website

NTR (stylised onscreen as ntr:) is a Dutch public-service broadcaster, supplying television and radio programming of an informational, educational, and cultural nature to the national public broadcasting system, Nederlandse Publieke Omroep (NPO). NTR was created in 2010, following the merger of the Nederlandse Programma Stichting (NPS) and two educational broadcasters, Televisie Academie (Teleac) and the Radio Volksuniversiteit (RVU). For details of these predecessor organizations, see further below.

Public broadcasting organizations in the Netherlands (that is to say, in the Dutch context, listener and viewer associations) do not have their own stations but are allotted airtime on the three public television and eight public radio networks broadly in relation to the size of their respective memberships. NTR, however, as an independently established statutory body, is not a membership-based organization.

== History ==
=== RVU (1931–2010) ===
RVU logo, 1983 to 2008

RVU, the Radio Volksuniversiteit (People's University Radio), was the longest-lived educational broadcasting organization in the Netherlands. Established in 1930 by the Bond van Nederlandse Volksuniversiteiten (Federation of Dutch People's Universities), it was at first granted airtime by the AVRO and VARA broadcasting associations. A licence to operate independently was obtained on 14 June 1931 and RVU became a public broadcaster in its own right in 1932.

In January 1983 RVU made its first television appearance, broadcasting a small number of programmes on both Nederland 1 and Nederland 2, before moving to Nederland 3 in 1988.

Its mission was to present informative and educational programmes encouraging listeners' and viewers' participation in society.

=== Teleac and NOT (1963–2010) ===
Teleac/NOT logo from 1996 to 2002

An initiative to air educational programming on public television led to the creation of the Television Academy (Teleac) in 1963.

Meanwhile Nederlandse Onderwijs Televisie (NOT) (Netherlands Educational Television) began operations on 27 June 1962, evolving from the Netherlands Education Film board in The Hague. Its purpose was to supply primary and secondary teachers with educational programmes for use in the classroom. These were made in co-operation with Teleac, RVU, and the NOS, although NOT have a broadcasting licence of their own. That changed in 1988 when the new Media Act established NOT as an independent broadcaster, and the new organization and its employees moved from The Hague to Hilversum, taking over full responsibility for the schools' programmes formerly produced by the NOS.

Early, tentative steps to merge the educational broadcasters were made in 1996, with Teleac and NOT – organizations that shared the common goal of producing educational programmes – merging to form Teleac/NOT. The combined organization reverted to using the overall name Teleac in September 2009, branding its output as Teleac (for adults), SchoolTV (for 4-18 yrs) and PeuterTV (for babies and toddlers).

A further joint venture was entered upon in 2005 when RVU and Teleac together formed Educom.

=== NPS (1995–2010) ===
On 28 April 1994, a new Media Act confirmed that the existing broadcasting associations operating within the public framework were to have their participation in the system extended for a further ten years and required them to increase their cooperation with each other. The Act also reinforced the brand identity of the public channels over that of the individual associations.

A new programming quota was outlined in which the associations were required to produce:

- 20% cultural output (of which half was to be creative artistic productions)
- 30% education and information

The NOS, which had produced such programming in addition to its core news output, was to be split in half, and pass those duties on to a newly created public broadcaster. The split was confirmed with the launch of the Nederlandse Programma Stichting (NPS) on 1 January 1995.

==== Proposed abolition ====
In mid-2005, Jan Peter Balkenende's second cabinet presented plans to renovate the broadcasting system, including abolition of the NPS by 2007. The proposal was met with fierce resistance from many viewers and listeners, given the dedicated and fairly sizeable audience for the NPS's output. The idea was that other broadcasters would take over the type of programming that the NPS had previously provided.

There was little confidence among viewers, however, that this would happen. It was speculated at the time that the real motive for the proposed abolition was that the governing parties (Christian Democrat and liberal-conservative) saw the foundation's output as being too left-wing. The plans were in the end withdrawn following the elections of November 2006.

=== Merger into NTR (2010–present) ===
NTR originated in 2010 from the merger of the broadcasters NPS, Teleac, and RVU. Since 1 September 2010, the three organizations have been broadcasting together as NTR. Joop Daalmeijer was the director of NPS and became the first director of NTR. Upon his retirement on 1 September 2011, he was succeeded by Paul Römer, who served as director until 2019.

On 1 January 2011, the three broadcasters were integrated into the NTR Foundation, with Pieter van Geel (CDA) serving as its first supervisory board chair. He stepped down in early 2014 and was replaced by Eric van der Burg (VVD). In 2019, Marcel Wintels, an entrepreneur, manager, and politician, took over from Eric van der Burg.

On 28 November 2024, the entire supervisory board of NTR resigned immediately due to a significant number of serious complaints about the work culture, particularly concerning media director Willemijn Francissen, which emerged during an investigation.

On 4 April 2025, the Dutch Minister of Education, Culture, and Science, Eppo Bruins, informed the House of Representatives in a letter that NTR would not be incorporated into one of the four or five new public broadcasting houses planned for 1 January 2029, as part of a reorganization of the public broadcasting system. In the letter, Bruins assured that the continuation of the broadcaster's programming would be secured.

Its programming focuses now on news analysis, education, culture, children's education, and ethnic minority output.

NTR's on-screen branding consists of their acronym in lower case ("ntr") followed by a colon punctuation mark (":").

== Mission ==
Its mission, as stated from its Business Plan of 2010:

The NTR contributes to a democratic knowledge society by creating informational, cultural and educational programs for the entire audience with the following core values: independent, impartial, objective, reliable, respect for people and their values, and orientation towards a society of active, independent and curious citizens.

== Programmes ==
Some examples of NTR programming:

=== Television ===
- Andere Tijden: a history program (co-production with VPRO).
- College Tour: an interview show, featuring the most high-profile Dutch and international guests.
- European Border Breakers Award (2004–2018)
- Het Klokhuis: a daily documentary show for primary school children.
- Nieuwsuur: in-depth news analysis (co-production with NOS).
- Sesamstraat: the Dutch-language version of Sesame Street.
- Het Sinterklaasjournaal: an annual children's television series targeted at school children which 'reports' the news covering Sinterklaas.

=== Radio ===
- Ekstra Weekend (2006–2013)
