= NPO 2 Extra =

- Country: Netherlands
- Broadcast area: Netherlands
- Network: NTR

Programming
- Picture format: 1080i HDTV (downscaled to 16:9 576i for the SDTV feed)

Ownership
- Owner: NPO
- Sister channels: NPO 1 NPO 2 NPO 3 NPO 1 Extra; NPO Politiek en Nieuws

History
- Launched: 1 September 2006; 20 years ago
- Former names: Cultura (2006-2009); Cultura 24 (2009-2014); NPO Cultura (2014-2018)

Links
- Website: NPO 2 Extra

Availability

Streaming media
- NPO: NPO 2 Extra - Live tv
- Ziggo GO: ZiggoGO.tv (Europe only)

NPO 2 Extra is a 24-hour public television channel from NPO devoted to documentaries, art and culture. Most programmes are supplied by NTR, AVROTROS, BNNVARA, KRO-NCRV, EO and VPRO. Topics covered include art, film, dance, theatre, literature, jazz and classical music.

On 26 March 2018 NPO Cultura was renamed to NPO 2 Extra.

The channel is expected to close in 2026 as part of cost-cutting measures at NPO. Its programming will be concentrated on NPO Start as well as online video formats for several platforms.

== Logos and identities ==
September 2006 to May 2009

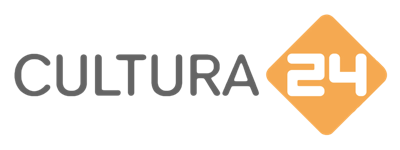
Cultura 24 logo used from 2009 until 2014

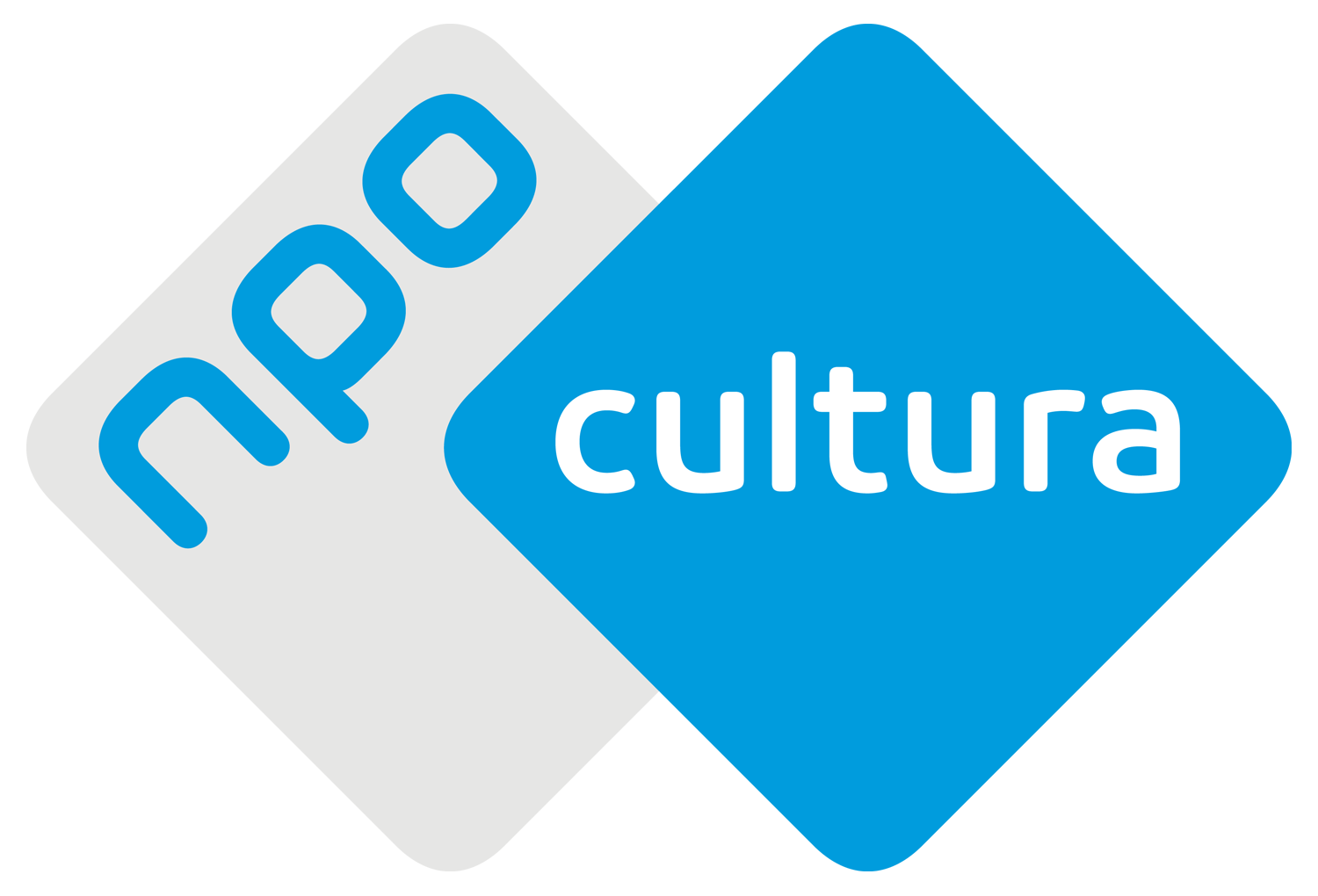
NPO Cultura logo used from 2014 until 2018
