= NPO 1 Extra =

- Country: Netherlands
- Broadcast area: Netherlands
- Network: AVROTROS; BNNVARA; EO; KRO-NCRV; MAX

Programming
- Language: Dutch
- Picture format: 1080i HDTV (downscaled to 16:9 576i for the SDTV feed)

Ownership
- Owner: NPO
- Sister channels: NPO 1 NPO 2 NPO 3 NPO 2 Extra; NPO Politiek en Nieuws

History
- Launched: 1 December 2006; 19 years ago
- Former names: HilversumBest (2006–2009); Best 24 (2009–2014); NPO Best (2014–2018)

Links
- Website: NPO 1 Extra

Availability

Streaming media
- NPO: NPO 1 Extra - Live tv
- Ziggo GO: ZiggoGO.tv (Europe only)

NPO 1 Extra is a television channel jointly operated by Dutch public broadcasters AVROTROS, BNNVARA, EO, KRO-NCRV and MAX. It was originally launched as HilversumBest on 1 December 2006. NPO 1 Extra presents highlights of more than sixty years of Dutch television history. The channel was founded by Han Peekel.

== History ==
In April 2009, HilversumBest was renamed as Best24. On 10 March 2014 the channel changed its name to NPO Best. On 26 March 2018 the channel was renamed as NPO 1 Extra.

NPO 1 Extra (along with NPO Zapp Extra) became a 24-hour channel on 25 December 2018. Previously, NPO 1 Extra time-shared with NPO Zapp Extra.

== Programming ==
NPO 1 Extra broadcasts programmes created by the public broadcasters from the NPO. Most programmes are from the archives of the Netherlands Institute for Sound and Vision. NPO 1 Extra is mainly focused on programmes from the 1980s and 1990s. Television programmes from other decades regularly passes in shortened or compiled versions. NPO 1 Extra has a linear programming with many regular program titles in the early evening. The soap Onderweg naar morgen and the comedy series Zeg 'ns AAA are scheduled daily on NPO Best.

== Logos and identities ==
December 1, 2006 to May 2009

December 1, 2006 to May 2009

May 2009 to March 10, 2014

March 10, 2014 to March 26, 2018

Since March 26, 2018
