= Nederlandse Publieke Omroep =

Dutch broadcasting foundation

- Logo since 2013
- Abbreviation: NPO
- Established: 2000; 26 years ago
- Type: Stichting
- Headquarters: Bart de Graaffweg 2, Hilversum
- Members: 13 broadcasters: AVROTROS; BNNVARA; EO; Human; KRO-NCRV; MAX; NOS; NTR; ON; PowNed; VPRO; WNL; Zwart
- Board of directors: Jet de Ranitz (chair); Lucien Brouwer
- Funding: Ministry of Education, Culture and Science
- Website: npo.nl
- Formerly called: Publieke Omroep (2000–2007)

Nederlandse Publieke Omroep (Dutch: [ˈneːdərlɑntsə pyˈblikə ˈʔɔmrup]; abbreviated NPO, [ˌɛmpeːˈjoː]), or Netherlands Public Broadcasting, is the central coordinating body of the Dutch public broadcasting system, responsible for administering public broadcasting services at the national level and ensuring the cohesion of the system as a whole.

The NPO is not a broadcaster itself, but facilitates cooperation among the various public broadcasting organisations, represents their collective interests, and manages budgets allocated by the government. In addition, the NPO oversees broadcasting schedules of the public broadcasters' joint national channels. The principal television networks under its remit are NPO 1, NPO 2, and NPO 3, which together provide a broad range of news, cultural, entertainment and educational programming. The NPO also operates several radio stations, digital platforms and on-demand services.

== Organisation ==
The NPO was established as a division within the Nederlandse Omroep Stichting (NOS) and was initially named "Publieke Omroep". On 1 January 2009, the NPO split from the NOS and became a separate legal entity. Its organisation consists of a board of directors, appointed by and accountable to a supervisory board. Until 2017, appointments required approval from the Minister of Education, Culture and Science. Originally, the supervisory board consisted of representatives of the broadcasting organisations, but in 2004 these were replaced by independent members appointed by royal decree. Since 1 January 2013, the board of directors has comprised a chairperson and up to two additional members.

The NPO is an active member of the European Broadcasting Union (EBU), and organised the Eurovision Song Contest 2021 with member broadcasters NOS and AVROTROS.

=== Broadcasters ===
The NPO is the umbrella organisation of thirteen broadcasters with a (temporary) broadcasting licence. Two broadcasters, NOS and NTR, carry statutory responsibilities in the areas of news, sports, education, and culture. The remaining broadcasters are membership-based broadcasting associations. These are:

- AVROTROS
- BNNVARA
- EO
- Human
- KRO-NCRV
- Omroep MAX
- Ongehoord Nederland
- PowNed
- VPRO
- WNL
- Omroep Zwart

== Tasks ==
The division of responsibilities between the NPO and the broadcasting organisations is defined in the 2008 Media Act. Broadcasters are responsible for producing programmes and their editorial content, while the NPO coordinates programming across all networks, channels, and platforms. It also manages the allocation of the government-funded programming budget, oversees technical distribution and transmission, and establishes rules for broadcasters and content producers.

Beyond its core tasks, the NPO undertakes several overarching activities, including:

- Accessibility services for the deaf, hard of hearing, blind and visually impaired (e.g. subtitling);
- Management of joint platforms such as NPO Start and NPO Luister;
- Administration of rights contracts;
- Acquisition of foreign programmes;
- Sale of Dutch formats abroad;
- Audience research;
- Marketing for all NPO channels.

== Channels ==
=== Television ===
- NPO 1
- NPO 2
- NPO 3

- NPO Zapp
- NPO Zappelin

- NPO 1 Extra
- NPO 2 Extra
- NPO Politiek en Nieuws
- BVN

=== Radio ===
- NPO Radio 1
- NPO Radio 2
- NPO 3FM
- NPO Klassiek
- NPO Radio 5
- NPO FunX
- NPO Blend
- NPO Sterren NL
- NPO Campus Radio

=== Online ===
- NPO Doc
- NPO Luister
- NPO Start
- NPO Plus
- NPO Talent
- NPO Kennis

== Logos ==
2000–2007

2007–2013

2013–present

== See also ==
- Regionale Publieke Omroep
