= NPO 3 =

Dutch terrestrial television channel

- Country: Netherlands
- Broadcast area: Netherlands, reaching bordering regions via overspill of the Dutch terrestrial network
- Headquarters: Hilversum

Programming
- Picture format: 1080i HDTV (downscaled to 16:9 576i for the SDTV feed)

Ownership
- Owner: NPO
- Sister channels: NPO 1 NPO 2 NPO 1 Extra; NPO 2 Extra; NPO Politiek en Nieuws

History
- Launched: 4 April 1988; 38 years ago
- Former names: Nederland 3 (1988–2014)

Links
- Website: NPO 3 website

Availability

Terrestrial
- Digitenne (FTA): Channel 3 (HD)

Streaming media
- Ziggo GO: Watch live (Europe only)
- KPN iTV Online: Watch live (Europe only)
- NPO Start: Watch Live (Netherlands only)

NPO 3 (known as Nederland 3 [ˌneːdərlɑn ˈdri] until 2014) is the third and youngest of the terrestrial television channels operated by the Dutch public-broadcasting organization NPO in the Netherlands. It carries programmes provided by member-based non-profit broadcasting associations and is oriented towards children, youth, and innovative television. The channel is also available on cable companies in its overseas dependencies in the Caribbean, either live or time-shifted.

== History ==
The idea of a third television channel was first explored when the second channel was being conceived: it was initially suggested that the second channel should be commercial, with some co-operation from NTS, while the public broadcasters would apply for the creation of a third channel, which would only open in 1969 at earliest. Eventually, NTS became the licensee of the channel.

In January 1984, musician Reinbert de Leeuw suggested the creation of a third television channel, setting up a foundation (Stichting Derde Net - Third Network Foundation) for the purpose. The initial plan was to broadcast fifteen hours a week (for three evenings a week). The network would only be approved by means of an amendment to the Broadcasting Act.

Initially, the third Dutch public television channel would be a joint venture with the Flemish public broadcaster VRT (then called BRTN), which would specialize in cooperative Netherlands/Flanders programming. With the pretended cooperation, BRT (now VRT) would either continue or terminate its second channel by operating it more lucratively. This plan failed but later resulted in a new television channel targeting Dutch and Flemish people living abroad. Two Dutch broadcasters, NPO and RNW, launched BVN as Zomer TV in 1996, and all of its programs originally came from the Netherlands (the abbreviation BVN at first standing for het Beste Van Nederland, "the best of the Netherlands"), this, however, changed, once the VRT began contributing both financially and delivering programmes, changing the channel from specializing in programming from the Netherlands to specializing in Dutch programming from the Netherlands and Flanders.

NPO 3 was established as 'Nederland 3' on 4 April 1988, however, the channel was used for experimental purposes for the Winter Olympic Games in Calgary earlier on in the year; having activated the transmitter network at 19:12 on 13 February. Nederland 3 became the home channel of the broadcasters VPRO, VARA, RVU, and NPS, all of which share a progressive outlook. The initial emphasis was news, culture, and sports. The full launch of the channel took place at 09:30 on 4 April 1988 and led to a realigning of the omroeps on the two existing channels. In addition to the founding omroeps, smaller omroeps such as IKON, Schooltelevisie, Islamitische Omroep Stichting, the Open University of the Netherlands, as well as Postbus 51 (government informations) and party political broadcasts also aired on this channel.

One of the initial ideas mooted by IKON president Wim Koole was that of a news programme similar to Newsnight and Tagesthemen, which would air at the end of the nightly schedule and that would be shared by all of the member broadcasters that had airtime on the channel. The channel changed its format in 1991, which would pave way for VARA, VPRO and NOS becoming the dominant broadcasters. In 1992, NOS's NOS-laat and VARA's Achter het Nieuws merged to create NOVA. On 1 October 1992, VARA, VPRO and the children and youth block from NOS joined the channel, whose purpose was still cultural.

July 1995 saw the arrival of NPS, VARA and VPRO, but did not share any announcements to the public until the start of the new television season in September (a VARA spokesman suggested it under the grounds of "choosing the right time").

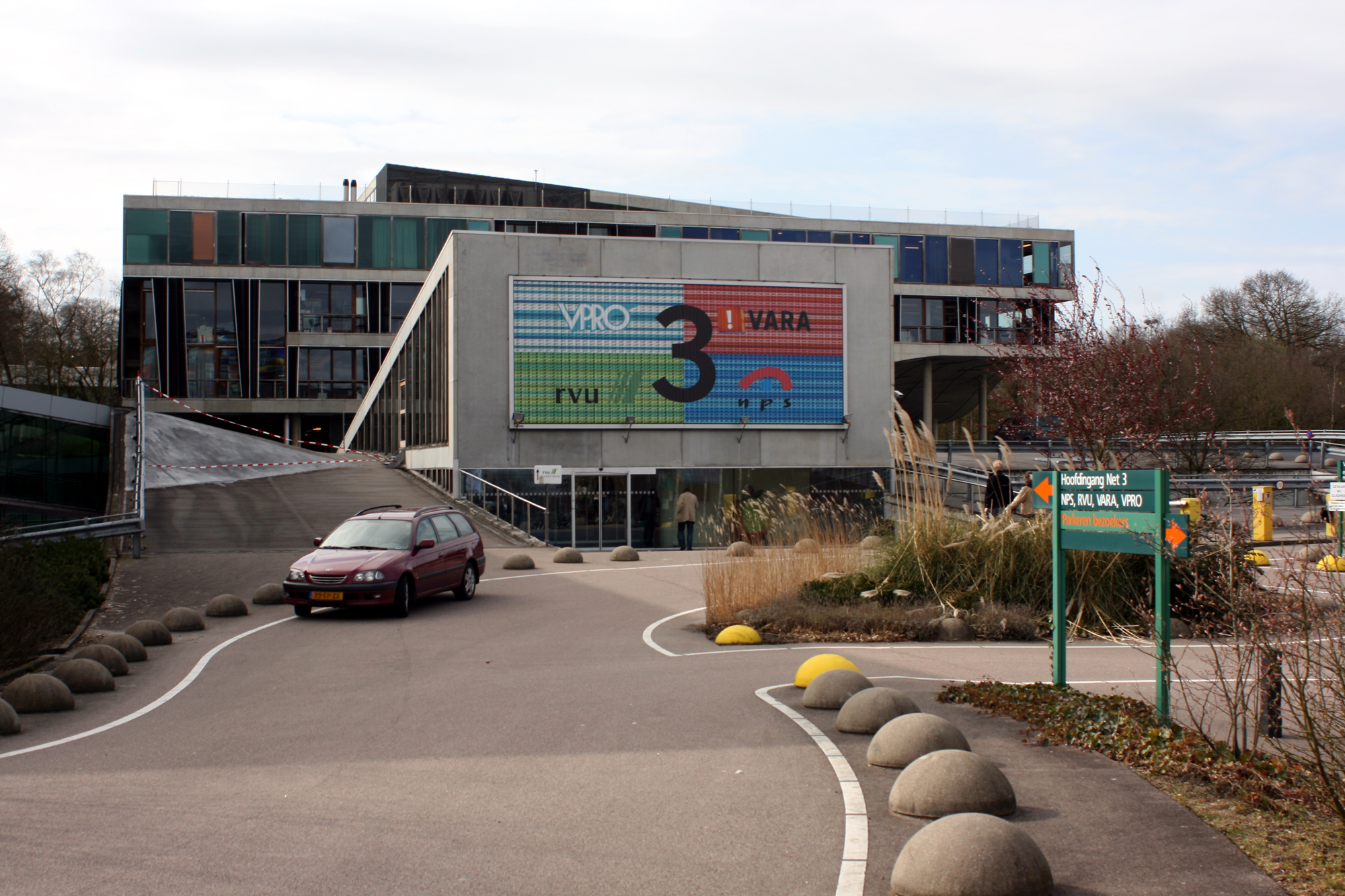
Shared headquarters of the broadcasters VPRO, VARA, RVU and NPS in 2007, featuring the 1999-2003 Nederland 3 branding. At the time, these were the key broadcasters of the channel.

In September 2000, AVRO, BNN, EO, KRO and TROS later joined this channel in producing more content for its programming output. The channel focused on news, debate, culture, and innovative television. Before the evening the channel's programming, under the label of Z@ppelin, was aimed at children.

As of 2002, VARA produced 25% of NOVA, the remaining 75% in production costs were paid by NPS. Similar arrangements were made for the documentary programme Zembla (VARA-NPS) and Buitenhof (VARA-NPS-VPRO). Plans were underway to change the arrangements in order for NPS to produce NOVA alone, while VARA would become entirely responsible for Zembla, as VARA was facing political constraints due to the Labour Party losing half of its seats in The Hague and had plans to move to Nederland 2. NPS and VPRO were anticipating the possible move.

In September 2006, the programming of NPO's television channels changed slightly. Nederland 3 still focuses on children during the daytime. In the evenings it aims to reach an open-minded audience with innovative, educational television and occasionally sports. All Dutch public broadcasting organizations have air-time on Nederland 1, Nederland 2 and Nederland 3; youth-oriented broadcaster BNN broadcast only on Nederland 3.

On 15 September 2007, the NPO channels Nederland 1, Nederland 2, and Nederland 3 switched completely to anamorphic widescreen, before that time some of the programming was already broadcast in widescreen.

On 4 July 2009, all three channels began simulcasting in 1080i high-definition. Before the launch of the permanent HD service, a test version of the Nederland 1 HD channel was made available from 2 June 2008 until 24 August 2008 to broadcast Euro 2008, the 2008 Tour de France, and the 2008 Summer Olympics in HD.

The channel finished 2013 as, by means of Zappelin and Zapp, the most watched channel among children ages 3 to 12, with a share of 20.6%, above its commercial competitors Nickelodeon and Disney XD. The last year it did such feat was 2001, when Zappelin was in its infancy.

On 12 March 2013, the NPO announced that Nederland 1, 2, and 3 would be renamed as NPO 1, 2, and 3. The reason for this change is to make the channels and their programmes more recognizable. The rebranding completed on 19 August 2014.

== Programming ==
Between 06:00 and 19:30, NPO Zapp and NPO Zappelin broadcast television aimed at children. This includes educational television like SchoolTV from broadcaster NTR.

After 19:30, the programming for youth and young adults starts. Between 2005 and 2013, De Wereld Draait Door was broadcast at this time, but moved to NPO 1. The programming is filled with films, drama and comedy (both made by public broadcasters and imported from foreign broadcasters), as well as successful programmes such as Top of the Pops, College Tour, De Lama's, Spuiten en Slikken and Raymann is Laat. It also broadcasts European football competitions live such as the UEFA Champions League until the 2015–16 season when it was moved to SBS6.

== Logos and identities ==
The channel's first logo was a triangle, which resembled a sort of equilateral pyramid, with the number 3 in it, designed by Will Bakker, who also did the start-up and closedown animations. On each side there are three lines (a red one, a green one and a blue one, representing the basic colors of television) when the numeral "touches" the edges of the triangle. The word NEDERLAND appears beneath the triangle. The package was extensive as it consisted of over 25 idents, including a long raft of generic idents, as well as idents for specific omroeps (RVU, Teleac, FEDUCO, IKON or Socutera) and niche services such as Zendtijd voor Politieke Partijen.

This was replaced in 1994 by a serif 3. When VARA and VPRO started broadcasting on Nederland 3, the triangular logo disappeared, as it was associated with the NOS years (when NOS was the main omroep of the channel). Lion Keezer designed the identity, using lighting effects, and a color scheme alluding to the flag of the Netherlands. In 1995, a new package by Ed Elting appeared, reusing the serif 3 introduced the year before, using stop-motion and other animation techniques.

In 1999, Mieke Gerritzen designed a new identity which combined the logos of the broadcasters involved and a new sans-serif 3 mark. During this period, NPO went through many changes, which meant that an unusually high number of variations and combinations were produced. The music was composed by Wim Conradi.

On 5 September 2003, all three Publieke Omroep channels unveiled new logos and a uniform rounded diamond shape; Nederland 3's was blue. British design agency Kemistry conceived the new identity, which consisted in pixel animations, each pixel was arranged to look like the diamond logo. The color changed depending on the ident or promo. For the 2005-2006 season, Kemistry made a second identity featuring full live-action footage. Jeroen Kuitenbrouwer compose the music.

In 2006, the logo changed; the diamond became a thick outline with a smaller white diamond in it, the 3 was now tilted to the right. In line with the channel's repositioning as a youth channel, its brand identity reflected the fact that the channel, like its demographic, is "filled with surprises". This was the third look done entirely by Kemistry; in the 2010 rebrand, the main work was done by Red Bee Media, with Kemistry only being in charge of promo animations. The Red Bee-designed idents show a sort of "human" factor with a person holding the channel's logo. Each ident explores a different, and, at the same time, alienating world, based on the type of programming seen on the channel, ranging from topics such as music, humor, nightlife, European football, philosophy and media. A total of eighteen idents were produced.

In 2013, the 3 became upright again, returning to its 2003 form, but this time, the diamond was green. The rebrand was done by Dog and Pony and Woodwork. It was amended to add a second diamond in 2014 when the channel was renamed NPO 3. In 2018, its current identity was unveiled. Instead of following the design used by NPO 1 and NPO 2, it chose to put the logo in the center. The new look was done solely by Woodwork.

First logo, 1988–1994

1994–1999

2003–2006

2006–2013

HD version, 2009–2013

2013–2014

2014–2018

2018–present

== See also ==
- Television networks in the Netherlands
