= NPO 1 =

First national television station in the Netherlands

Coordinates: 52.2391028°N 5.1691576°E

- Logo used since 2014
- Country: Netherlands
- Broadcast area: Netherlands, reaching bordering regions via overspill of the Dutch terrestrial network
- Headquarters: Hilversum

Programming
- Language: Dutch
- Picture format: 2160p UHDTV (downscaled to 1080i and 16:9 576i for the HDTV and SDTV feeds respectively)

Ownership
- Owner: NPO
- Sister channels: NPO 2 NPO 3 NPO 1 Extra; NPO 2 Extra; NPO Politiek en Nieuws

History
- Launched: 2 October 1951; 75 years ago
- Former names: NTS (1951–1964); Nederland 1 (1964–2014)

Links
- Website: NPO 1 website

Availability

Terrestrial
- Digitenne (FTA): Channel 1 (HD)

Streaming media
- Ziggo GO: ZiggoGO.tv (Europe only)
- Live HD TV: Watch live (Worldwide)
- NPO Start: Watch Live (Netherlands only)

NPO 1 (NPO een, known as Nederland 1 [ˌneːdərlɑnt ˈeːn] until 2014) is the first national television station in the Netherlands. It launched on 2 October 1951. It provides public broadcasting and currently exists next to sister channels NPO 2 and NPO 3. Several broadcasting organisations of the Publieke Omroep deliver a wide variety of programs for the channel, usually for larger audiences. In 2018, it was the most viewed channel in the Netherlands, reaching a market share of 22.0%. The channel is also available via cable TV in the Dutch Caribbean, either live or time-shifted.

== History ==
=== Early years ===
In the Netherlands, the first television experiments took place in the 1930s. Dutch technology company Philips played an important role in these experiments and had its own station from 1948 to 1951. In 1951, public radio broadcasters AVRO, KRO, VARA and NCRV established the NTS, Nederlandse Televisie Stichting (Dutch Television Foundation). The launch of the regular service was approved on 18 August 1950, with a tentative 1 May 1951 launch date for the first tests, as well as a transmitter in Lopik and studios in Hilversum or Duivendrecht. The first public broadcast began from studio Irene in Bussum on 2 October 1951 at 8:15 pm. It was transmitted from Lopik, soon followed by Hilversum as well. On 5 January 1956, the NTS broadcast their first news programme, NTS Journaal. In the 1950s, television attracted only a low number of viewers due (mainly) to the high price of television sets at the time. During that same decade, television became available nationally by the introduction of more transmitters and repeaters in Goes, Roosendaal, Loon op Zand, Mierlo, Roermond, Markelo, Ugchelen, Zwolle, Smilde and the new Gerbrandy Tower in IJsselstein.

By 1956, the sole television channel increased its airtime.

=== Creation of Nederland 1 ===
From October 1960, NTS began broadcasting daily from 8:00 pm till 10:20 pm. Two years later the broadcasting hours were extended from 26 to 30 hours a week. On 1 October 1964, a second public television channel began broadcasting, Nederland 2 and the first public broadcasting channel was renamed into Nederland 1. In 1967, colour television broadcasts were introduced by using the PAL-system. Also in that same year advertising between programmes was introduced. In 1969, the Dutch government adopted the so-called open-system for the public broadcasting system, allowing more public broadcasting organisations; however, the government dictated that a potential new organisation must have 100,000 members or more to be allowed in. On 29 May 1969, the NTS and the Dutch Radio Union (NRU) merged into the NOS serving as an umbrella organisation for the public broadcasting organisations. Its main focus is on general news and sports broadcasts and also provides technical and administrative coordination.

On 2 January 1967, Nederland 1 increased its airtime slightly, to accommodate the arrival of Ster commercial breaks, shown on Mondays to Saturdays, but not on holidays. Up until then, the channel opened at 6:55pm on weekdays, but the start-up time had to be pushed ahead to 6:45pm. The schedule still opened with a five-minute programme for children followed by a news summary, which had to be increased to five minutes.

=== Retoolings ===
In anticipation of the launch of new commercial channels broadcast by satellite, a third television network, Nederland 3 launched in April 1988. Its launch led to the realignment of the omroeps on the two existing channels. Nederland 1 was the mainstay of the broadcasters KRO, NCRV, VARA and EO, the same four organisations that voted against a possible commercial system. On 30 September 1991, Nederland 1 introduced a new logo which depicts a yellow "1"-numeral that is placed inside a blue diamond, and at the same time, VARA was moved to Nederland 2, while AVRO moved to this channel, thus earning the nickname AKN (AVRO-KRO-NCRV). Another restructuring was made on 28 September 1992 when Nederland 1 abolished in-vision continuity, in favour for voiceover continuity and at the same time, religious and humanism broadcasters moved from Nederland 3 to Nederland 1, where they were given more airtime for their output. In return, EO moved to Nederland 2, before making their programming output available on all three channels on 24 August 2000 before the huge revamp from 4 September 2006.

Luxembourg-based RTL-Véronique began broadcasting in October 1989. In 1992, the government of the Netherlands legalised commercial television, and a number of new commercial channels were established resulting in a reduction in the market share of the public networks. In 2000, the channel was realigned; it continued to carry KRO, NCRV and AVRO programming but partitioned EO programming with Nederland 2; in general, its new audience would largely consist of religious conservatives.

=== Transition to (U)HD and the NPO ===
Until 2006, each public broadcasting organisation had been associated with just one channel, being either Nederland 1, Nederland 2 or Nederland 3. In the 2006/2007 season, the three channels got re-arranged. Nederland 1 became the flagship television channel aimed at a wide audience, Nederland 2 got more highbrow programming with news, current affairs, and documentaries, and Nederland 3 is oriented towards children, youth, and innovative television. The NOS is no longer the coordinating organisation as this function is taken over by the newly formed NPO.

On 16 September 2007, Nederland 1, Nederland 2, and Nederland 3 switched completely to anamorphic widescreen—before that time, only some of the programming was broadcast in widescreen. On 4 July 2009, all three channels began simulcasting in 1080i high-definition. Before the launch of the permanent HD service, a test version of the Nederland 1 HD channel was made available from 2 June 2008 until 24 August 2008 in order to broadcast Euro 2008, the 2008 Tour de France, the 2008 Summer Olympics, and The Simpsons in HD.

On 12 March 2013, the NPO announced that Nederland 1, 2, and 3 would be renamed as NPO 1, 2, and 3. The reason for this change is to make the channels and their programmes more recognizable. The rebranding was completed on 19 August 2014.

NPO 1 launched its first trials with ultra-high-definition television through KPN, CanalDigitaal and some minor networks on 14 June 2018, using the HLG standard.

KPN started to switch its digital terrestrial television platform to the DVB-T2 HEVC standard in October 2018; this transition was completed on 9 July 2019. The same applied to UEFA Euro 2024 where NPO 1 UHD could be received in 1920x1080 in 50 full frames per second in HDR, or 1080p50/HDR-HLG.

== Programming ==
Currently, most of the biggest productions of Dutch public broadcasting television programs are shown on NPO 1, sometimes called the flagship of the NPO. Some notable programmes broadcast through the year are:

Programme	Rough translation^{1}	Broadcaster	Description
Buitenhof		AVRO, VARA, VPRO	Sunday-morning interview show, politically oriented.
Blik op de weg	View on the road	AVRO	Traffic programme, about traffic and traffic violations.
Boer zoekt Vrouw	Farmer wants a Wife	KRO	Dutch version of Farmer Wants a Wife
De Erwin Straatsma Rookshow	The Erwin Straatsma Smokeshow	AVRO, TROS	Interview programme
De Reünie	The Reunion	KRO	Human interest, old classmates from high school reunite and talk about their lives.
De Rijdende Rechter	The Driving Judge	NCRV	An official judge holds a trial on location for people.
Detective fiction programmes		mostly KRO	Several detective series, for example Midsomer Murders or A Touch of Frost
EénVandaag	OneToday	AVRO, TROS	Current affairs
Heel Holland Bakt	All Of The Netherlands Bakes	Omroep MAX	A baking contest, Dutch version of The Great British Bake Off.
Koefnoen		AVRO	Satirical, sketches with impersonations of famous Dutchmen.
Lieve Paul	Dear Paul	VARA	Entertainment, it consists of celebrity interviews, variety performances, and interaction with the studio audience.
NOS Journaal	NOS News	NOS	News
NOS Studio Sport		NOS	Sport, the most viewed episodes consist of summaries of Eredivisie football matches, but in other episodes, several other sports and sports events (ranging from big international, to smaller national events) are covered.^{2}
De Wereld Draait Door	The World Keeps On Spinning	VARA	Talk show
Sesamstraat	Sesame Street	NTR	Dutch version and spin-off of Sesame Street, moved to NPO 3 from 1 January 2016 in order to enable the airing of Tijd voor MAX, formerly from NPO 2
Spoorloos	Without a trace	KRO	Reality programme where people are helped in finding missing persons, with a focus on finding the biological relatives of adopted people. In the United Kingdom known as ITV's Long Lost Family.
Te land ter zee en in de lucht	On land, at sea and in the air	TROS	Game/entertainment show, people must race through an obstacle course in self-made vehicles.
TROS Radar		TROS	Consumer programme
Tussen Kunst en Kitsch	Between Art and Kitsch	AVRO	Similar to the British Antiques Roadshow
TV Show		TROS	Interview programme with several famous national and international guests.
Vermist	Missing	TROS	Reality programme where people are helped in finding missing persons
Villa Felderhof		NCRV	Interview programme, from a luxurious villa in St. Tropez.
Wie is de Mol?	Who is the Mole?	AVRO	Dutch version of The Mole.
De Simpsons	The Simpsons	NPS	One episode: "Treehouse of Horror VI".
De Wiggles	The Wiggles	TROS	Dutch version and spin-off of The Wiggles

^{1} Translation added only when it clarifies the original title of the programme.
^{2} Special, extra long broadcasts are made during important events such as the FIFA World Cup, the Tour de France or the Olympic Games.

== Logos and identities ==
The first identity used by Dutch television was that of a flag, representing NTS, NOS's predecessor, and was made by Peter Zwart. The purpose was to give the omroeps an idea that they were responsible for the following programme. Zwart later became the first designer of Dutch television, making graphics for the omroeps, initially live filmed models, later switching to animations.

1973 to 1984

4 April 1988 to 30 September 1991

30 September 1991 to 5 August 1996, replaced by a white-on-red variation

4 September 2000 to 5 September 2003

5 September 2003 to 19 August 2014; similar to the current logo, but without the NPO logo

4 July 2009 to 19 August 2014; Nederland 1 HD logo

Since 19 August 2014; similar to the 2003 logo, but with the NPO logo

== See also ==
- Netherlands Public Broadcasting
