= NPO 2 =

Television channel in the Netherlands

- Logo used since 2014
- Country: Netherlands
- Broadcast area: Netherlands, reaching bordering regions via overspill of the Dutch terrestrial network
- Headquarters: Hilversum

Programming
- Language: Dutch
- Picture format: 1080i HDTV (downscaled to 16:9 576i for the SDTV feed)

Ownership
- Owner: NPO
- Sister channels: NPO 1 NPO 3 NPO 1 Extra; NPO 2 Extra; NPO Politiek en Nieuws

History
- Launched: 1 October 1964; 62 years ago
- Former names: Nederland 2 (1964–1990, 2000–2014); TV2 (1990–2000)

Links
- Website: NPO 2 website

Availability

Terrestrial
- Digitenne (FTA): Channel 2 (HD)

Streaming media
- Ziggo GO: Watch live (Europe only)
- KPN iTV Online: Watch live (Europe only)
- NPO Start: Watch Live (Netherlands only)

NPO 2 (known as Nederland 2 [ˌneːdərlɑn ˈtʋeː] until 2014) is a Dutch television channel, the sister channel of NPO 1 and NPO 3. It was established on 1 October 1964 at 20:00, initially with a 2.5-hour schedule until 22:30.

NPO 2 tends to broadcast arts, culture, politics, news, current affairs, documentaries and religious programmes. In the mornings, NPO 2 simulcasts NPO 1's news bulletins with sign language.

The channel is also available on cable companies in its overseas dependencies in the Caribbean, either live or time-shifted.

== History ==
In his first speech as leader of the Labour Party on 2 October 1962, Anne Vondeling suggested the creation of a second television channel. He proposed the Dutch public broadcasting system a plan for an expensive service, which, in order to cover operating costs, would allow commercial advertising, which was still illegal on Dutch television, while also reducing the price of television sets. The channel would provide a "real alternative" to the existing channel and would appear if a commercial company would be in charge. In the following month, the government amended the proposal to a 30-hour a week service, in which 20 hours would be given to the commercial television company and 10 hours to NTS. The public broadcasters, however, would apply for a third television channel, which was expected to be in operation from 1969 at earliest.

By 1963, when the project for the second channel was under construction, a private company, Commerciële Radio- en Televisiemaatschappij (CRT) from The Hague, was interested in either the planned new channel, or a third one. In case the request wasn't awarded, CRT would manufacture a transmitter for its own right, as CRT also planned the creation of a radio station. The government's NTS-backed bid won on Christmas Eve 1963. The new plan stipulated 17-and-a-half hours of programming: NTS got 40% while the remaining pillarised broadcasters got the remaining 60%. Broadcasts under a provisional agreement were set to start on 1 October 1964. Under the agreement, the broadcasters would not operate at the same time on both channels until a permanent agreement was signed, with the deadline being 30 June 1965. The government also had a two-point consensus for the channel: an in-depth analysis of the second channel, taking into account the situation of the Netherlands at the time, including political divisions, as well as potential licensees and the need from the business sector of opening up television to advertising, coupled by the influence of television from foreign countries; and what broadcasters were apt for the second channel, considering limited economical resources, what would its key characteristics be, as well as regulations for advertising (if approved). At the long term, the second NTS channel would require more money than the broadcasting fees of the time.

The UHF band was selected for broadcasts, on UHF channel 27. At the same time, TV Noordzee was interested in starting its broadcasts, using the VHF band already used by NTS. At the time, viewers were directed to buy a TV set that could receive UHF signals (most television sets manufactured between late 1960 and early 1961 at earliest could already pick up the band, while television sets manufactured before 1959 required a special converter). Test transmissions started on 4 March 1964. These broadcasts were only received through the IJsselstein-Lopik transmitter. On 1 October 1964, the official broadcasts of Nederland 2 started and the first public broadcasting channel NTS was renamed into Nederland 1. The first programme seen at 7:30pm was a documentary on the thirteen-year history of Dutch television up until that point, followed at 7:55pm by a speech from NTS president E.A. Schüttenhelm. These two programmes were broadcast on both channels.

On 11 January 1967, per a J-JET decision, the channel was eligible for the introduction of colour broadcasts from 1 January 1968, set to run for six to eight hours a week. Set manufacturer Philips, who was aware that West Germany would start on 24 August that year, said that it would increase the amount of jobs, mostly for the manufacturing of colour sets. It also conducted colour test transmissions in Waalre, which were set to be discontinued when Hilversum or Bussum would start their broadcasts. On 2 October 1967, colour broadcasts were introduced on Nederland 2; the first such programme being In de dagen (In Those Days), the first in a joint six-part CVK-IKOR-RKK children's programme about the life of the prophet Isaiah, with illustrations by Noni Lichtveld. Initially, only one hour of programming a day was in colour.

After the launch of Nederland 3 in 1988, Nederland 2 became the mainstay channel of the broadcasters AVRO, TROS, VOO/Veronica and VPRO, earning it the nickname ATV. These omroeps voted in favour of a commercial system. On 30 September 1991, AVRO moved to Nederland 1 whereas VARA moved to this channel. Another restructuring was made on 28 September 1992 when EO moved from Nederland 1 to Nederland 2 and in return, VARA and VPRO moved to Nederland 3. In 1995 VOO/Veronica split from the Netherlands Public Broadcasting to become a commercial channel; its final broadcast on 31 August was a documentary on its history.

Due to the success of RTL 4, by the early 90s, the channel had become a lossmaker; in November 1993, the channel announced the premiere of a soap opera to combat Goede tijden, slechte tijden, and contracted the same Dutch production company (JE Productions) to do it, with a tentative January 1994 launch date.

In 2000, TV2's name reverted to Nederland 2. Its new profile was the mass public, presenting large quantities of TROS, BNN and NOS programming and a small quantity of EO programming. The new line-up consisted of sports, events, entertainment and news of easy consumption for the wider audience.

On 16 September 2007 the NPO channels Nederland 1, Nederland 2, and Nederland 3 switched completely to anamorphic widescreen, before that time some of the programming was already broadcast in widescreen.

On 4 July 2009, all three channels began simulcasting in 1080i high-definition. Before the launch of the permanent HD service, a test version of the Nederland 1 HD channel was made available from 2 June 2008 until 24 August 2008 in order to broadcast Euro 2008, the 2008 Tour de France, and the 2008 Summer Olympics in HD.

On 12 March 2013, the NPO announced that Nederland 1, 2 and 3 will be renamed as NPO 1, 2 and 3. The reason for this change is to make the channels and their programmes more recognizable. The rebranding completed on 19 August 2014.

== Programming ==
NPO 2 is aimed at viewers who wish for a more intelligent style of programming. Fixtures of the channel's schedule include:

- Repeats of the week's programmes from across the NPO network (shown on weekdays between 9:10 am and 4 pm)
- Nieuwsuur, an in-depth current affairs programme broadcast at 10 pm every night
- Repeats the day's current affairs programme overnight (such as Nieuwsuur)

Cultural programmes are generally broadcast during the day on Saturdays, and Sunday mornings are home to religious programmes, such as the BBC's Songs of Praise.

== Logos and identities ==
1973 to 1984

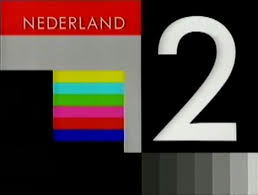
1984 to 1988 (with test card)

February to October 1990

October 1990 to September 1994

September 1994 to 2000

2000 to 2003

2003 to 2006

2006 to 2014

HD version, 2009 to 2014

2014–present

== See also ==
- Television networks in the Netherlands
