= EBC =

EBC may refer to:

== Education ==
- EBC Hochschule, a business school in Hamburg, Germany
- Escuela Bancaria y Comercial, a business school in Mexico City
- Escondido Bible College, in California, United States
- Eternity Bible College, in Simi Valley, California, United States
- Eugene Bible College, now New Hope Christian College, in Oregon, United States
- The Salvation Army Evangeline Booth College, in Atlanta, Georgia, United States

== Media ==
- Eagle Broadcasting Corporation, a Philippine commercial broadcaster
- Eastern Broadcasting Company, a Taiwanese television network
- Empire Broadcasting Corporation, an American radio network
- Empresa Brasil de Comunicação, a Brazilian public broadcaster
- Emu's Broadcasting Company, a British children's television programme
- Ethiopian Broadcasting Corporation, Ethiopian public broadcaster owned by the government of Ethiopia
- Ehime Broadcasting, a Japanese commercial broadcaster

== Science and medicine ==
- Estonian Biocentre, in Tartu, Estonia
- European Brain Council, an international health organization
- Exhaled breath condensate
- Eyeblink conditioning

== Technology ==
- EFI Byte Code, a format for writing CPU-independent UEFI device drivers
- Electronic beam curing
- Entity–control–boundary (or entity–boundary–control), an architectural pattern in the domain of software engineering

== Other uses ==
- Belize Elections and Boundaries Commission
- Emmanuel Boat Club, the rowing club of Emmanuel College, Cambridge
- Encore Beach Club, a dayclub and pool complex on the Las Vegas Strip
- English Benedictine Congregation
- Entertainer's Basketball Classic, an American basketball tournament
- Eugene Ballet, in Oregon, United States
- European Brewery Convention, an industry organization
- Evangelical Baptist Convention, an Indian Christian denomination
- Everest Base Camp
- Exchange Bank of Canada, a Canadian commercial bank
- EBC Financial Group, a foreign exchange broker
