= HAL Investments =

Dutch investment company

HAL Investments NV
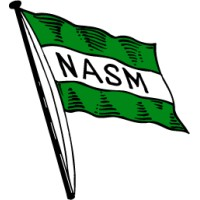
- Type: N.V.
- Traded as: Euronext Amsterdam: HAL
- ISIN: BMG455841020
- Founded: 1977
- Headquarters: Weena 696; Rotterdam, Netherlands
- Key people: Jaap van Wiechen (CEO); Martijn van der Vorm (member of the supervisory board)
- Products: Investments
- Revenue: €12.373 billion (2024)
- Net income: €1.433 billion (2024)
- Owner: HAL Holding N.V.
- Number of employees: 32,474 (2024)
- Website: www.halinvestments.nl

HAL Investments is a Dutch investment company.

The shipping company Holland America Line was founded in Rotterdam in 1873. In 1989, the company was sold to the American Carnival Corporation & plc for 1.2 billion guilders. With the proceeds from the sale, it was decided to establish an investment company under the name HAL Holding, all shares of which are owned by HAL Trust; HAL Trust is in turn listed on the Euronext stock exchange in Amsterdam.

== Ownership and structure ==
The largest share, approximately 68%, of the publicly traded shares of HAL Trust is owned by the founding Van der Vorm family, and management was for a long time in the hands of Martijn van der Vorm (1958–2026). The family is among the wealthiest families in the Netherlands and was ranked second without interruption in the Quote 500 from 2009 through 2022, with an estimated fortune of €4.3 billion in 2009 and €8.6 billion in 2022. The Van der Vorm family is known for being highly private. Martijn van der Vorm, chairman of the management board, stepped down after 21 years on 30 September 2014. He remained chairman of the supervisory board until May 2025. He was succeeded by Melchert Groot, who had already worked for HAL for 25 years and had been a member of the management board since 2003. On 1 April 2024, Jaap van Wiechen took office as CEO; he had been a member of the management board since 2024 and had at that time worked for HAL for 27 years.

Hans Melchers owned 17% of the shares, leaving only around 15% freely tradable on the Amsterdam Stock Exchange.

Due to complex international shareholding structures, only a minimum degree of disclosure is required. HAL Holding NV is based in Curaçao. All shares are owned by HAL Trust, whose assets are managed in the Bermuda Islands.

Predecessors of Martijn van der Vorm at Holland America Line and HAL Investments included Willem van der Vorm (1873–1957), Willy van der Vorm (1897–1963) and Nico van der Vorm (1927–1995).

Since 2011, the Van der Vorm family has also been active through the charitable foundation De Verre Bergen, which focuses on social initiatives in Rotterdam. In January 2017, it became public that the family had also established the Droom en Daad foundation to promote art and culture in Rotterdam. Former director of the Rijksmuseum Wim Pijbes serves as its director. The Nieuw Vaarwater foundation, which conducts negotiations over the debts of families in poverty in Rotterdam, and Fonds de Loods, which buys out those debts in a single transaction, are also among the philanthropic activities of the Van der Vorm family.

At the end of April 2026, Martijn van der Vorm died at the age of 67.

== Investments ==
In addition to investments in companies connected with the maritime sector, HAL has also invested in many other industries. HAL Investments aims to acquire large stakes in companies and seeks to exercise actual influence over corporate policy. Through a buy-and-build strategy, it attempts to create long-term value by combining companies.

The investment company has, among others, the following major shareholdings; the figures in parentheses indicate the equity stake at year-end 2025.

=== Listed investments ===
- Koninklijke Vopak (51.4%), the largest independent tank terminal operator in the world.
- Safilo (49.8%), a producer and distributor of sunglasses and frames, listed on the Italian stock exchange.
- SBM Offshore (23.4%), active in the construction, leasing and operation of floating storage and production platforms (FPSO). HAL has been a shareholder in this company since December 2012.
- Technip Energies (17.1%), a supplier to the energy sector, listed on Euronext Paris.

=== Unlisted investments ===
- 280ppm (95%), an investor in early-stage companies that mitigate the causes and effects of climate change and facilitate the energy transition.
- Ahrend (96.5%) and Gispen, suppliers of office furnishings and school furniture.
- AN Direct (90.0%), the holding company of MD Hearing and a seller of hearing aids in the United States.
- Anthony Veder Group (62.9%), maritime transport, mainly LNG and industrial gases.
- Atlas Professionals (86.9%), an international staffing agency in the maritime and oil and gas sectors.
- Auxilium (53.1%), a holding company of 14 businesses in medical devices.
- Boskalis (100%), one of the world’s largest service providers in dredging, maritime infrastructure and maritime services (stake of 45.5% as of 31 Dec. 2020). On 10 March 2022, HAL made an offer for all remaining shares in Boskalis at €32.50 per share, or about €4.2 billion in total. HAL described it as a friendly offer under which Boskalis’s strategy would continue unchanged. The offer was later slightly increased to €33.00 per share. By 21 September 2022, HAL already held 98.3% of Boskalis’s shares. In the following months, HAL acquired the remaining shares and delisted Boskalis.
- Broadview Holding (97.4%), which produces, among other things, composite panels for façade cladding and laboratory furniture and has more than 6,000 employees. Well-known brands include Trespa and Formica.
- Coolblue (56.4%), a retail chain in consumer electronics.
- DMFCO, a mortgage provider under the brand name MUNT Hypotheken.
- FD Mediagroep (100%), which publishes, among other titles, Het Financieele Dagblad and operates the radio station BNR Nieuwsradio, as well as websites.
- GreenV (76.4%), greenhouse construction.
- Infomedics, a payment processor for dentists and physiotherapists.
- IQIP, a supplier of foundation and installation tools for the maritime industry.
- Prodrive Technologies (46.8%), a technology company. In December 2021, HAL acquired a minority stake, while Prodrive founders Pieter Janssen and Hans Verhagen remained co-owners in equal proportions.
- Rotter Y Krauss (100%), an optical retail chain in Chile that remained part of HAL as part of the sale of GrandVision.
- SB Real Estate, a property developer that acquired two shopping centres as of August 2019: De Aarhof in Alphen aan den Rijn and City Passage in Veldhoven.
- Timber and Building Supplies Holland N.V. (TABS, 95.0%), building materials; its shares are also traded on the illiquid market (NPEX). TABS consists of 15 companies, including PontMeyer and Jongeneel.
- Top Employers Institute. This company certifies and compares policies in the field of human resources.
- Van Wijnen (88%), active in residential construction, non-residential construction, project development and renovation activities. The company has more than 30 branches in the Netherlands and employed 2,374 FTE at year-end 2024.

=== Former major investments ===
AudioNova is a retail chain for hearing aids. In May 2016, HAL reached an agreement to sell AudioNova International to the Swiss company Sonova for €830 million. The sale resulted in a net book gain of approximately €470 million. AudioNova had more than 1,300 stores in eight European countries. Revenue in 2015 amounted to €359 million. The transaction was completed on 15 September 2016.

HAL was the major shareholder in the optical retail chain GrandVision and decided in September 2014 to bring the company to the stock market. GrandVision includes, among others, the brands Pearle, EyeWish Groeneveld and Het Huis. GrandVision operated in around 40 countries, had more than 20,000 employees and generated revenue of €2.5 billion in 2013. Around 500 of GrandVision’s 4,900 stores were located in the Netherlands. GrandVision has been listed on the Amsterdam Stock Exchange since 6 February 2015. The initial offering price was set at €20 per share, implying a total market value for the company of €5 billion. HAL offered 20% of the shares and therefore retained a 78.5% stake in the optical retail chain after the IPO. At the end of 2014, the book value of HAL’s stake in GrandVision was approximately €800 million. After an agreement in principle on a takeover by the large competitor and supplier EssilorLuxottica, the latter sought to withdraw from the agreement. After a long series of lawsuits, the deal was ultimately upheld in mid-2021. HAL sold its stake in GrandVision for at least €5 billion. In October 2021, the acquiring party made an offer of €28.45 for the remaining outstanding shares.

=== Former holdings ===
- Orthopaedic aids, sold in 2022 to Ottobock.
- Flight Simulation Company FSC, aviation. CAE Inc. acquired this company at the end of 2020.
- MYLAPS, active in the development and production of identification and timing equipment for sports events. This company was sold to Nordian Fund III in mid-2022.
- Floramedia, active in specialist printing, marketing and communication services for the green sector. CCL Industries Inc. acquired this company in mid-2022.

== Financials ==
The table below provides an overview of HAL’s results since 2005 as reported in its annual reports.

Year	Revenue	Operating result	Of which result from minority participations	Net result
Year	(× million)			
2005	€2653	€465.1	€115.2	€311.6
2006	€2779	€593.1	€250.3	€496.8
2007	€3187	€848.6	€426.5	€735.7
2008	€3563	€492.1	€187.9	€383.1
2009	€3448	€441.0	€199.0	€347.2
2010	€3769	€546.6	€283.4	€432.1
2011	€3996	€620.9	€295.9	€493.0
2012	€4049	€542.6	€261.5	€406.2
2013	€4115	€568.2	€310.6	€472.8
2014	€4546	€699.0	€316.6	€556.4
2015	€5148	€831.6	€328.4	€629.6
2016	€5498	€1115.6	€73.7	€870.7
2017	€5610	€653.2	€184.3	€391.2
2018	€6123	€388.0	€ −55.1	€154.7
2018 (r)	€2402	€62.0	€ −54.4	€154.7
2019	€2965	€413.3	€235.3	€665.8
2020	€3387	€246.9	€113.2	€629.0
2021	€7213	€4465.2	€341.1	€4270.0
2022	€10,104	€806.9	€875.4	€495.9
2023	€12,344	€1603.0	€346.1	€1167.6
2024	€12,373	€1870.9	€402.2	€1433.2

In 2024, HAL’s equity increased to €14.8 billion, or €163.59 per share.
