= De Wereld Draait Door =

Dutch television show

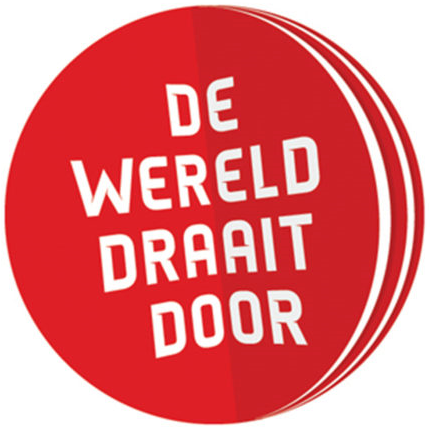
- Genre: Talk show, entertainment
- Directed by: Dieuwke Wynia
- Presented by: Matthijs van Nieuwkerk
- Country of origin: Netherlands
- Original language: Dutch

Production
- Production locations: Westergasfabriek, Amsterdam
- Running time: Circa 53 minutes
- Production company: BNNVARA

Original release
- Network: NPO 3 (2005–2013); NPO 1 (2014–2020)
- Release: 10 October 2005 – 27 March 2020

De Wereld Draait Door ([də ˈʋeːrəl(t) draːit ˈdoːr]; DWDD) is an early-evening talk show on Dutch television, broadcast every weekday at 7:00 p.m. on NPO 1. It was the Netherlands' longest-running, regularly scheduled TV entertainment show and had the second-highest viewing figures of any Dutch television program, beaten only by the main evening news at 8.00 p.m. The title meant "The World Keeps Turning", or figuratively "The World Is Going Mad". The show, created by Dieuwke Wynia and produced by BNNVARA, was discontinued after the last episode on 27 March 2020.

== Content ==
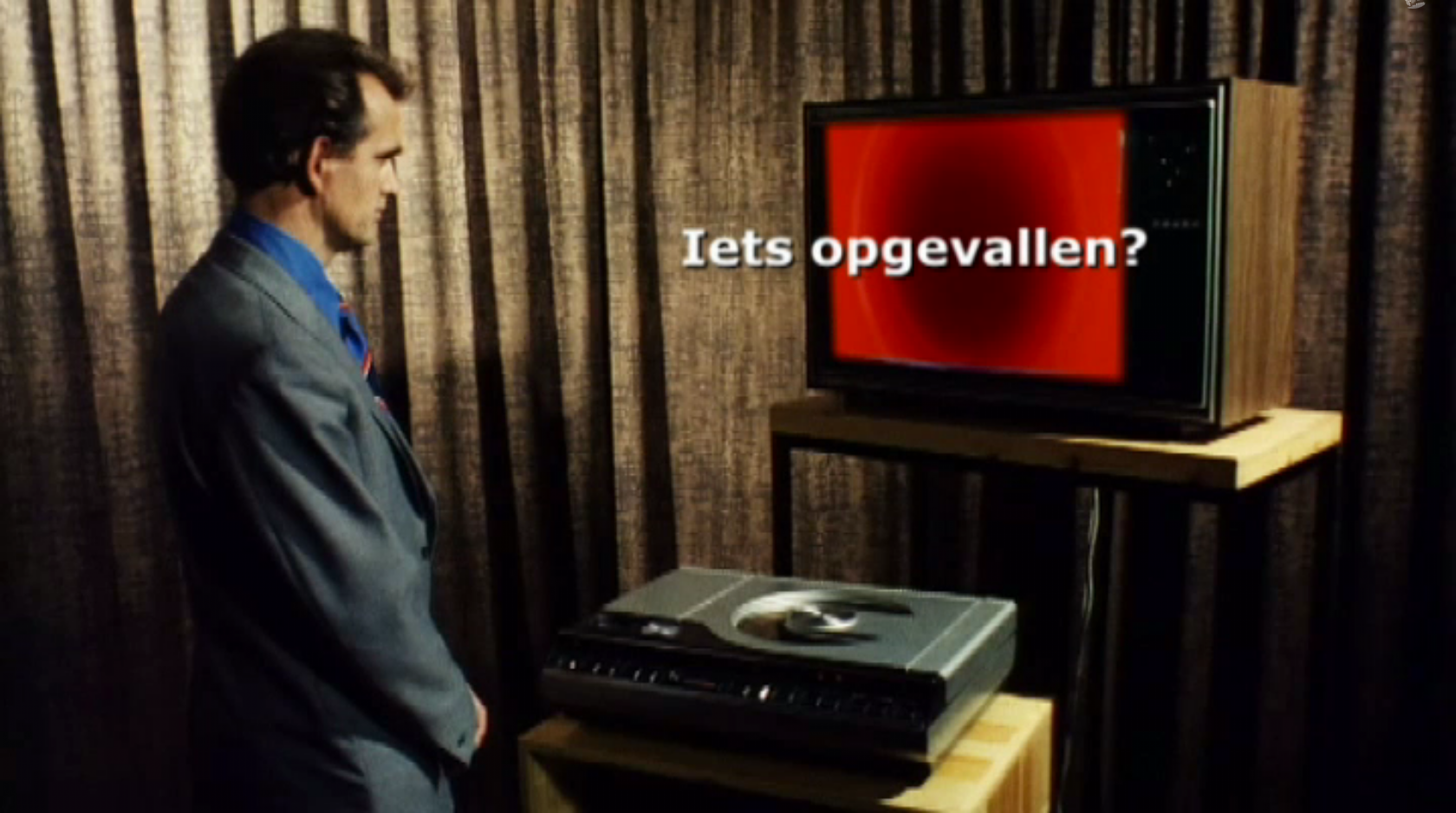
A person with a laserdisc player and a television. This image was used in De Wereld Draait Door to end the part "De Televisie Draait Door"

The chat, conducted at a large table, was hosted by Matthijs van Nieuwkerk and a rotating guest co-host. Guests were politicians, celebrities, artists, or simply people involved in projects or organizations that were topics of interest. The show contained a mixture of news, information, television bloopers and general entertainment. Frequent guests and panelists included Jan Mulder, Yvon Jaspers, Halina Reijn, Giel Beelen, Mathijs Bouman, Sylvana Simons, Marc-Marie Huijbregts and André van Duin. House poet Nico Dijkshoorn had a weekly column in the show, usually on Wednesday. Each show had a live performance of a band in the studio. The show's closing sequence was Lucky TV, a small movie clip that featured a parody of news with changed voice-over text added to the video. One of those ending clips, where Hillary Clinton and Donald Trump were singing a duet during a presidential debate, became a viral phenomenon. From 2014, Dutch Eurovision Song Contest entries were premiered on the show.

== DWDD University ==
DWDD University was a series of special episodes, in which a professional expert in a certain area held a one-and-a-half hour long lecture to a general audience. It commenced in 2012 with a lecture by then IAS director Robbert Dijkgraaf about the Big Bang.

The following speakers have contributed to DWDD university:

Date	Speaker	Subject	Location	Viewership
17 May 2012	Robbert Dijkgraaf	Big Bang	Ronde Lutherse Kerk (Church)	991,000
16 November 2012	Robbert Dijkgraaf	The smallest (microcosms)	Westergasfabriek, Amsterdam	1,056,000
26 April 2013	Alexander Klöpping	De Wereld van Klöpping 1.0 (the past of Silicon Valley)	MC Theater	586,000
3 May 2013	Alexander Klöpping	De Wereld van Klöpping 2.0 (the present of Silicon Valley)	MC Theater	466,000
10 May 2013	Alexander Klöpping	De Wereld van Klöpping 3.0 (the future of Silicon Valley)	MC Theater	536,000
29 November 2013	Robbert Dijkgraaf	Albert Einstein theories	Westergasfabriek, Amsterdam	859,000
13 December 2013	Robert Kranenborg	Cows	Westergasfabriek, Amsterdam	725,000
28 November 2014	Robbert Dijkgraaf	Infinity	Westergasfabriek, Amsterdam	1,104,000
12 December 2014	Freek Vonk	Poison	Westergasfabriek, Amsterdam	1,462,000
30 April 2015	Erik Scherder	Human brain (part 1): De Aanknop	Podium Mozaïek	
7 May 2015	Erik Scherder	Human brain (part 2): Bloedstollend	Podium Mozaïek	
14 May 2015	Erik Scherder	Human brain (part 3): Het Geheugen	Podium Mozaïek	
28 May 2015	Twan Huys	DWDD Summerschool: Bill and Hillary Clinton		858,000
4 June 2015	Gijs Scholten van Aschat	DWDD Summerschool: William Shakespeare		645,000
11 June 2015	Claudia de Breij	DWDD Summerschool: Het Nederlandse lied (Dutch song)		925,000
18 June 2015	Wim Pijbes	DWDD Summerschool: Rijksmuseum Amsterdam		998,000
25 June 2015	Mart Smeets	DWDD Summerschool: American big four: baseball, ice hockey, basketball and American Football		719,000
2 July 2015	Wilfried de Jong & Michel van Egmond	DWDD Summerschool: Miles Davis		
27 November 2015	Robbert Dijkgraaf	Black holes	Westergasfabriek, Amsterdam	1,212,000
12 March 2016	Beatrice de Graaf	Terrorism		1,216,000
2 December 2016	Robbert Dijkgraaf	Light	Westergasfabriek, Amsterdam	
9 December 2016	Freek Vonk	Evolution	Westergasfabriek, Amsterdam	
