= Bobby Dillon =

American football player (1930–2019)

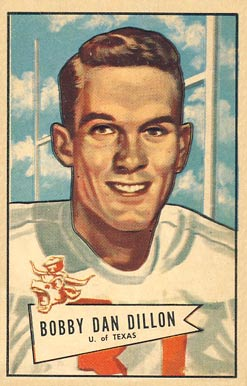
- Dillon on a 1952 Bowman trading card

No. 44
- Position: Safety

Personal information
- Born: February 23, 1930; Pendleton, Texas, U.S.
- Died: August 22, 2019 (aged 89); Temple, Texas, U.S.
- Listed height: 6 ft 1 in (1.85 m)
- Listed weight: 180 lb (82 kg)

Career information
- High school: Temple
- College: Texas
- NFL draft: 1952: 3rd round, 28th overall pick

Career history
- Green Bay Packers (1952–1959)

Awards and highlights
- 4× First-team All-Pro (1954, 1955, 1957, 1958); 4× Pro Bowl (1955–1958); Pro Football Hall of Fame; Texas Sports Hall of Fame; Green Bay Packers Hall of Fame; First-team All-American (1951); First-team All-SWC (1951)

Career NFL statistics
- Interceptions: 52
- Fumble recoveries: 3
- Total touchdowns: 5
- Stats at Pro Football Reference
- Pro Football Hall of Fame

Bobby Dan Dillon (February 23, 1930 – August 22, 2019) was an American professional football player who spent his entire eight-year career as a safety with the Green Bay Packers of the National Football League (NFL). He was an All-American playing college football with the Texas Longhorns. Although he was a safety, he also returned kicks and played several games at halfback. Dillon finished his college career with 13 interceptions on defense, one touchdown as a halfback, and multiple kick returns for touchdowns. He was selected by the Green Bay Packers in the third round (28th pick) of the 1952 NFL draft.

After multiple accidents during his childhood, Dillon lost one of his eyes and played his entire career with a glass eye. Despite his handicap, he became one of the most successful defensive backs of his era. Dillon's 52 career interceptions are a Packers' franchise record. He was a four-time Associated Press All-Pro and four-time Pro Bowler. Dillon intended to retire at the end of the 1958 season, but the Packers' new head coach, Vince Lombardi, convinced him to return for 1959. After an injury halfway through the season, he lost his starting job and retired. The 1959 season was the only year during Dillon's tenure that the Packers had a winning record. In recognition of his football achievements, Dillon was elected to the Green Bay Packers Hall of Fame in 1974 and the Texas Sports Hall of Fame in 1996. After his football career, Dillon earned a bachelor's degree and worked for Wilsonart for 36 years, eventually becoming president and chief executive. He died on August 22, 2019, at the age of 89, after complications from dementia. Five months after his death, he was elected to the Pro Football Hall of Fame as part of the NFL's centennial class and inducted in August 2020.

== Early life ==
Bobby Dan Dillon was born on February 23, 1930, in Pendleton, Texas, one of five children of Clyde and Ruby (née Pearl) Dillon. His family moved to Temple, Texas, where he grew up and his father was employed as a police officer.

As a child, a series of eye injuries led to the removal of Dillon's left eye. At the age of five or six, Dillon got a small piece of metal in his left eye, which caused a cataract to grow; Dillon had surgery to remove the cataract. Then, when Dillon was nine years old, he was hit in the face with a board, causing damage to the white of his eye which ultimately led to the deterioration of his left eye and prevented his eye from dilating. At the age of ten, Dillon had his left eye removed, and it was replaced with a glass eye. Dillon said of his missing eye: "I don't remember seeing out of that eye, so maybe that has something to do with it. If it gives me any trouble, I'm not aware of it, because I've never known anything else." According to one story, during a game in his professional career, Dillon's glass eye fell out onto the field. As he picked it up, a referee joked to Dillon, "What would you do if you lost your other eye?" Dillon responded, "I'd be a referee."

He attended Temple High School, where he played football from 1945 to 1947. In his senior season, Dillon led Temple to a 6-2-1 record, losing in the 10AA district title game to the eventual state champions, Waco High School. Dillon earned a football scholarship from the University of Texas at Austin. In an interview, Dillon revealed that contingent upon receiving the scholarship from Texas, the university had required that Dillon's father sign a waiver, indicating that if Dillon suffered another eye injury while playing football, the family would not hold Texas responsible; Dillon's father signed the waiver.

He was named to the Texas High School Sports Hall of Fame in 2001.

== College career ==
=== Football ===
Dillon played football at Texas from 1949 to 1951 where he was best known as a safety but also returned kicks and played several games at halfback. He set several records including some that still stand today.

In 1949 he played in every game as Texas went 6-4 and led the team in interceptions with 4. In his college debut, against Texas Tech, he returned a punt 55 yards for a touchdown and also scored a 20-yard rushing touchdown. That year he led the SWC in punt return average with 19.5 yards per return.

In 1950 he again led the team in interceptions (4) and helped the team win the 1950 Southwest Conference (SWC) Championship and finish the regular season ranked #2/#3 in the country before losing the 1951 Cotton Bowl to the Tennessee Volunteers. Against Oklahoma he had a 45-yard interception return for a touchdown that was the 3rd longest in school history at the time and that gave the Longhorns the lead in a game they eventually lost. He had a game-winning 84-yard punt return for a touchdown against Baylor University a few weeks later, that was the 2nd longest in school history at the time, on the way to setting the school record for most punt return yards in a season (334) and the highest average yards per punt return in a season at 22.3 yards per return - a record he still holds.. Then, the next week against TCU, he had a 48 yard interception return for a TD that was the surpassed his pick-6 from earlier in the season as new 3rd longest in school history at the time. His 2 pick-6s set, and is still tied for, the single-season school record.

He was co-captain of the 1951 team that was ranked all season, at one point as high as #4, but fell out of the rankings after being upset by Texas A&M in the final game. He was named first team All-Southwest Conference and also first team All-American by the AP and NEA (as a safety) and the Football Writer's Association of America (as a defensive halfback). He needed one more selection to be a consensus All-American (he was also chosen an All-American by the Chicago Tribune but that was not one of the selections that counts towards consensus). That season he had a punt return average of 13.1 yards per return, second only to his mark of the previous year.

He finished his career having set the school records for career punt returns (50), punt return yards (861), interception return yards (190) and most yards per punt return (17.2) - the last of which he still holds. He also finished with 13 interceptions, the 2nd most in school history at the time.

In the summer after his senior year, he competed in the Chicago Charities College All-Star Game when the all-stars were defeated by the L.A. Rams.

=== Track ===
Dillon also participated in track and field as a sprinter in 1950 and 1951 as Texas won the SWC championship both years.

In 1972 he was inducted into the Texas Athletics Hall of Honor.

== Professional career ==
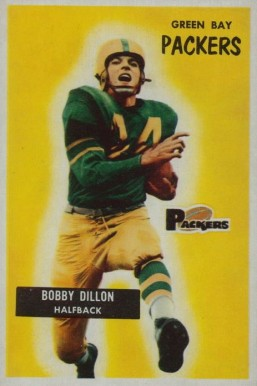
Dillon on a 1955 Bowman trading card.

Dillon was drafted out of Texas by the Green Bay Packers in the third round (28th pick) of the 1952 NFL draft and played with the Packers from 1952 to 1959, becoming one of the greatest "ballhawks" in NFL history.

He led the Packers in interceptions for seven of his eight seasons in the league, and he had nine interceptions in a season three times. In 1953, he set the team record for interceptions in a game, with 4, which he recorded in a loss against the eventual NFL-champion Detroit Lions in the 1953 Thanksgiving game. With less than two minutes left in his record-setting game, Dillon injured his knee, which caused him to miss the final two games of the 1953 season. Despite missing those two games, Dillon finished 1953 with nine interceptions and was healthy enough to return at the start of 1954.

In 1956 he had a league-best 244 interception return yards. Between 1953 and 1958 he had 48 interceptions, for an average of eight interceptions per season.

He had 52 career interceptions becoming the all-time Packers career interceptions leader. When he retired, Dillon had the second most interceptions in league history, behind only Emlen Tunnell, who was at that time Dillon's teammate. For his "ballhawking" skills, Dillon was nicknamed "The Hawk" by his Packer teammates. In his career, Dillon recorded 976 interception return yards, including five he returned for touchdowns. Dillon's 976 interception return yards is the most in Packers' history.

Dillon also returned 4 punts for 37 yards over his NFL career.

Dillon was selected to the Pro Bowl every season from 1955 to 1958, and was named an Associated Press All-Pro in 1954, 1955, 1957, and 1958, while also earning All-Pro honors from other organizations in 1953 and 1956.

Over Dillon's professional career, he played under four full-time (Note: The final two games of the 1953 season were coached on an interim basis by McLean and Hugh Devore) coaches: Gene Ronzani (1952–53), Lisle Blackbourn (1954–57), Scooter McLean (1958), and Vince Lombardi (1959). During the 1957 season, while still a player Dillon helped coach defensive backs under Blackbourn after defensive coach Tom Hearden had a stroke.

In June 1959, Dillon informed the team that he intended to retire. However, the Packers' new coach, Vince Lombardi employed the team's personnel director Jack Vainisi to convince Dillon to return to the Packers, and Vainisi was successful. Dillon returned for the 1959 NFL season, playing in the first eight games before being sidelined with a leg injury and losing his starting job to John Symank. Dillon ultimately retired before the end of that season, at the age of 29. Upon Dillon's retirement, Lombardi called Dillon the "best in the league" and referred to him as irreplaceable. The 1959 team was the only Packers team he played on that finished with a winning record after going 7-5 and finishing 3rd in the West Division.

He was named to the Pro Football Hall of 2020.

== Later life ==
After retiring from the NFL, Dillon earned a bachelor's degree in accounting and went on to work for Wilsonart, a manufacturer of high-pressure decorative laminates. Dillon remained with the company for 36 years, eventually becoming president and chief executive. Dillon retired from Wilsonart in 1995. On January 27, 1951, Dillon married Ann Dillon (née Morgan), with whom he had two children. Ann Dillon died in 2017. Dillon died on August 22, 2019, at the age of 89 in Temple, due to complications from dementia. Dillon was survived by his two children, three grandchildren, and five great-grandchildren.

== Legacy ==
Although Dillon consistently played at a high level throughout his career, his tenure coincided with one of the least successful time periods in Packers' history. During his eight-year career, the Packers only had one winning season and went a combined 33–55–2. This included the 1958 season, when the Packers had the worst record in team history (1–10–1). Dillon's only winning season came after Lombardi convinced him to un-retire for the 1959 season, where he teamed up with Emlen Tunnell to form one of the best defensive backfields in history.

Dillon was well respected though for the personal success he attained in the NFL, especially considering he played his entire career with just one eye. However, due to the poor play of the Packers during his tenure, Dillon had to wait many years for his accolades. In 1969, he was named to the Packers 50th Anniversary team. Five years later he was elected to the Green Bay Packers Hall of Fame; in 1996 to the Texas Sports Hall of Fame and in 2001 to the Texas High School Sports Hall of Fame. However, he was consistently overlooked for the penultimate honor of induction into the Pro Football Hall of Fame. In 2011, the Professional Football Researchers Association (PFRA) named Dillon to the "Hall of Very Good Class of 2011", an informal honor given by the PFRA to the best NFL players not yet in the Hall of Fame.

However, after over 50 years of eligibility, it was announced in January 2020 that Dillon would be enshrined in the Pro Football Hall of Fame as a member of the NFL's centennial class, a special expanded class of inductees to celebrate the 100th season of the NFL. His bust was sculpted by Scott Myers. With his induction, Dillon became the 26th Packer player in the Hall of Fame. The announcement of Dillon's Hall of Fame selection came less than a year after his death.

Raymond Berry, a Hall of Fame receiver who played for the Baltimore Colts from 1955 to 1967, praised Dillon in 2013, calling him "one of the most superior athletes you’ll ever find in the NFL". In 2004, teammate Dave Hanner summed up Dillon's reputation:

He and Willie Wood were the two best safeties we ever had [in Green Bay]. Old Bobby was smart, and he was tough. He'd get knocked out a couple times a game, but he'd come right back. When [Vince] Lombardi came here, he talked about Bobby being the best defensive back in the league at the time.
