= Mathijs Bouman =

Dutch economist and journalist

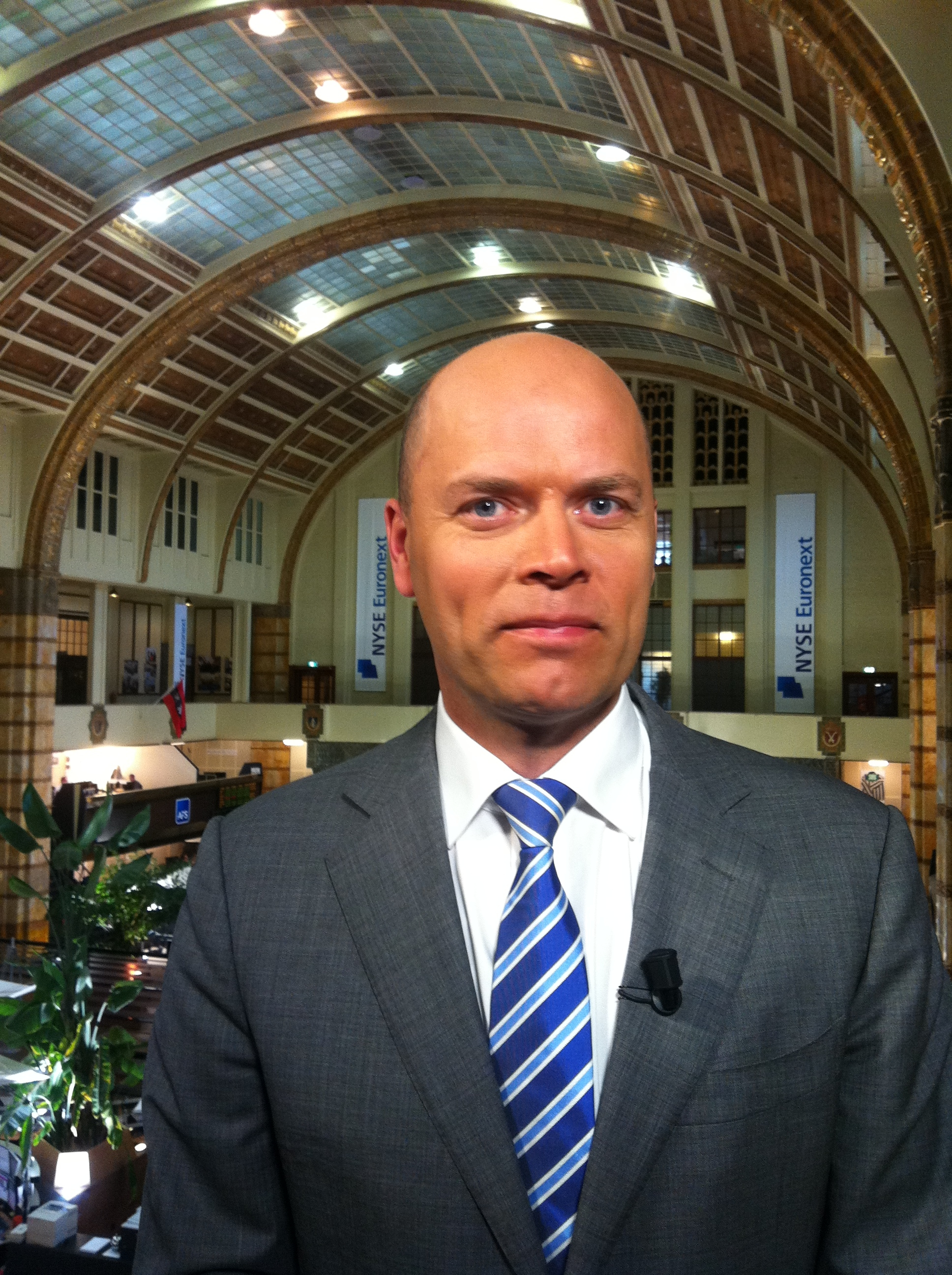
Mathijs Bouman, in the TV studio of the Amsterdam Stock Exchange.

Mathijs Nicolaas Bouman (born 1 May 1966) is a Dutch economist and journalist. He is a regular contributor to the TV programs RTL Z and De Wereld Draait Door and writes columns for Het Financieele Dagblad and the business website Z24.nl. A critic of the Dutch Polder model, in which "bad luck is officially forbidden" and "accidents are banned", he is referred to as a market liberalist, and as a prominent opinion builder whose Twitter account is recommended for "peppered" opinions.

== Biography ==
Born in Wijdewormer, Bouman graduated from the Pascal College in Zaandam (1986), and got his Ph.D. in economics from the University of Amsterdam (1998) under Rick van der Ploeg and Sweder van Wijnbergen, specializing in econometrics. He published on material flow analysis and the intersections of economics and environment. After his promotion, he was a researcher at three Dutch universities, and worked for De Nederlandsche Bank between 2003 and 2005.

Bouman has become a notable TV personality. He is a frequent panelist on De Wereld Draait Door, a TV talk show focusing on current events; he is referred to as a "TV economist" and a "media economist". He comments (for RTL Z and other outlets) on economic topics including the stock exchange and the 2008 financial crisis. From 2007 to 2010 he wrote a column for De Groene Amsterdammer. As of 2013 he is a regular columnist for Het Financieele Dagblad.

He is the author of two books on Dutch economics: Hollandse Overmoed ("Dutch Overconfidence", 2006) and De Elektrische Spijkerbroek en andere avonturen in de economie ("The electric jeans and other adventures in the economy", 2010), a collection of his columns with observations on and anecdotes from the Dutch economy. A review in the NRC Handelsblad noted a number of worthwhile one-liners, including "If women pay fewer taxes, men will vacuum more often" and "the world's tallest buildings are usually an omen of disaster".
