= Freedman-Burnham Engineering Corporation =

- Industry: Aerospace
- Founded: 1937
- Founders: Walter E. Burnham; Gordon L. Freedman
- Headquarters: Cincinnati, Ohio, United States
- Key people: Donald B. Miller (Chief Engineer)
- Revenue: $500,000+ (mid 1940s)
- Number of employees: 16 (1937)

The Freedman-Burnham Engineering Corporation was a manufacturer of light aircraft propellers located in Cincinnati, Ohio.

== History ==
The Freedman-Burnham Engineering Corporation was founded in 1937 after Gordon L. Freedman, a student at Tri-State College in Angola, Indiana went into business with his professor, Walter E. Burnham. Their new product debuted at the Chicago Air Show in 1937. The company was originally located in Detroit, Michigan, but later moved to Cincinnati, Ohio in 1938.

After moving to the city, it set up shop on the third floor of the Daylight Building at 659 East Sixth Street. However, in 1941 the company moved to the fifth floor due to the need for additional space to accommodate increased production.

Burnham left the company in 1944 and went to work for the Beech Aircraft Corporation. Following his departure, the company's assets were sold at auction in 1946. It moved to Michigan that same year.

== Products ==
Its propellers were somewhat unusual in that they were both wood and adjustable pitch. Wood was chosen over metal as the latter was seen to be too heavy and too expensive. By 1943, it was producing propeller blades from plastic impregnated wood manufactured by the Formica Insulation Company.
