= Spann House =

Historic building in Yonkers, New York

Coordinates: 40.97575°N 73.88673°W

Spann House is an historic Victorian-style building in Yonkers, New York.

Spann House was constructed in 1897 as a single-family residence. The house was built in regional stone at a time when all the neighboring houses were built in wood. Spann House is one of the few buildings in Yonkers with entirely stone bearing walls. Spann House was converted to a multifamily residence in 1931. In 1999, it was purchased and renovated.

== History ==
Spann House was built in 1897 for Isaac Osgood Carleton. Carleton operated an import/export business in New York City. Unlike its neighbors the Spann House had an all stone structure, a simple form and basic dormered gable roof, which seemed an Active Design departure at a time when wood construction was cheaper and more popular than stone.

In 1931, the current owners of Spann House converted it to a multifamily residence. Many of the other single family residences were left in disrepair, as their owners died or moved. In the 1970s a rash of development surrounded Spann House with multi-story apartment buildings. Between 1970 and 1975 one development company alone built five apartment buildings within a mile of Spann House.

In 1999 Kathryn Spann. a New York City lawyer, purchased Spann house. By then, it was a dilapidated but functioning apartment building. She purchased it from the estate of Sanislav Kira, a carpenter who specialized in high-end church furniture. Spann maintained its multi-family designation to offset the enormous cost of purchasing and renovating the building.

== Site ==
Spann House sits at the edge of the Old Croton Aqueduct Trail, which slopes down towards Warburton Avenue and the Hudson River. The house site is covered in lush vegetation that includes pine, maple, hostas and fern. Rocks jut out all over the site. The stone on the site is Yonkers Gneiss. Warburton Avenue runs parallel to the Hudson River and is relatively level. this flatness is the reason for the street's early development and growth. New York Statesman, The future of Warburton Avenue, 1883.

Spann house has a large porch on the parlor level, and large windows from all the rooms looking out on the east side to the aqueduct, on the north and south at the Lawn and hosta gardens respectively.

Approaching from Warburton Avenue, stone steps take visitors past a 15 foot deep step in the slope at the front of the site approximately 5 feet above street level. This is the first garden and has always been the most manicured part of the site. Where there were probably local ornamental flowers, Spann now has vegetable gardens and ornamental plants.

The next level on Spann House is the house level, the southern portion near the entrance is partially manicured and covered in hostas. On the north side there is a large lawn used to host garden parties and was probably hedged by rose bushes, as is evident in the remnant bushes that line the area.

A big problem with rejuvenating the Spann House garden was the abundance of vines. As a result of years of neglect thick vines had taken over the lawn and manicured gardens. Truckloads were removed to return the grounds to their pristine state.

== Form and materials ==
The Spann house buildings form an extruded rectangle plan, the only irregularities being the protrusion of bay windows to let in the views of the Hudson. The roof is a steeply pitched Gable, with Gable dormers on the north and south sides. In plan, Spann house is generally similar to its middle class Victorian counterparts. It has a porch that wraps around the south side to the front, a partially submerged lower level, a raised first level, two floors above that and an attic. The plan was converted first in the 1930s and at least once in the 1980s before its present configuration.

What would have been the parlor floor during Spann House's incarnation as a single-family residence now contains a large, one-bedroom apartment, which housed Spann during renovation. Another large one-bedroom apartment occupies what would have been the living floor. The floor, where the family bedrooms would have been, was converted to a two-bedroom apartment and where there was a kitchen and servants quarters in the cellar, now there are two studio apartments and a work room. It is connected to the Warburton Avenue on the south west corner by a stone stair, and via a single car garage at the northernmost corner of the site.

Spann researched the history of the Spann House and found images of it close to when it was built. The color used on the wood trim was an approximation based on the photos. She repointed the walls and rebuilt the wall and steps leading to the house from the street and up to the aqueduct. To restore the interiors she referenced images from comparable houses in the area.

Spann gutted the house as the interiors had begun to wear, the last extensive renovation had been in the 1970s. At that time, Formica surfaces and a new boiler was added and the electrical system and most fixtures were replaced.

Spann's renovation took over five years, due in equal parts to the availability of funds and the tedium of sourcing quality vintage or vintage style fixtures along with the complexity of maintaining at least 3 tenants at all times.

== Sources ==
- Allison, Charles Elmer. The History of Yonkers. New York: Wilbur B. Ketchum, 1896.
- Bolton, Robert. The History of the Several Towns, Manors, and Patents of the County of Westchester. Philadelphia, J. B. Lippincott & Co., 1924.
- City of Yonkers Water board
- Fishman Robert, Bourgeois Utopias: The Rise and fall of Suburbia, Basic Books 1946
- Hall, Edward Hagaman. Philipse Manor Hall at Yonkers, N.Y. The Site, the Building and its Occupants. New York: The American Scenic and Historic Preservation Society, 1925.J
- Archer, John. Architecture and Suburbia: From English Villa to American Dream House, 1690-2000. Minneapolis: University of Minnesota Press, 2005.
- Kirkwood, Agnes E. Church and Sunday–School Work in Yonkers: Its Origin and Progress. New York: George L. Schearer, 1889.
- Rebic, Michael P. Landmarks Lost & Found: An Introduction to the Architecture and History of Yonkers. Yonkers Planning Bureau and the Yonkers Environmental Impact Advisory Commission, 1986.
- The Guilds committee for the federal writers publications Inc, New York City Guide, 1939
- Sanchis, Frank. American Architecture: Westchester County, New York: From Colonial to Contemporary. North River Press, Inc., 1977.
- Scharf, Thomas J. History of Westchester County, New York. Philadelphia: L.E. Preston & Co., 1886.
- Sharon Irish. "A 'Machine That Makes the Land Pay': The West Street Building in New York." Technology and Culture 30 (April 1989): 376-397
- Spann Yonkers tribune online, Letter Addressed to Sharon Ebert, Deputy Commissioner for Planning & Development; Roman Kozicky, Chairman, Yonkers Planning Board; and Lee Ellman, Planning Director By Kathryn C. Spann, December 11, 2009
- Taracircle.com
- Victoriansource. Com
- Yonkers Historical Society
- Yonkers Illustrated. Yonkers Board of Trade, c. 1900
