= Maica =

Maica may refer to:

- Maica García Godoy (born 1990), Spanish water polo player
- Maica Morada (born 1988), Filipino volleyball player
- Maica Laminates, a Malaysian company

== See also ==
- Maica_n (born 2000), Japanese singer-songwriter
- Maicas, a municipality in Aragon, Spain
