= Greenlam Industries =

Indian manufacturing company

- Type: Public
- Traded as: BSE: 538979; NSE: GREENLAM
- Industry: Building material
- Headquarters: India
- Area served: Worldwide
- Key people: Saurabh Mittal (Managing Director & CEO), Parul Mittal (Director)
- Products: Laminates; Restroom Cubicles; Veneers; Wooden Floors; Wooden Doors; Plywood; Particle Board
- Parent: Greenlam Industries Limited
- Subsidiaries: Greenlam Limited; Greenlam America Inc.; Greenlam Asia Pacific (Thailand) Co. Ltd.; Greenlam Asia Pacific Pte. Ltd.; Greenlam Decolan SA
- Website: www.greenlamindustries.com

Greenlam Industries Ltd. is a surfacing and substrate products manufacturer based in India. The company provides laminates, Plywood, exterior & interior clads, decorative veneers, particle board and engineered wooden floors & doors for residential and commercial spaces. The company was founded in 1993 and is based in New Delhi, India.

Greenlam Industries is listed on the National Stock Exchange (NSE) and the Bombay Stock Exchange (BSE).

== History ==
In 1992, Greenlam Industries set up the first laminate unit at Behror and started the commercial production and export of laminates. In 2002 it started the commercial production of decorative veneers. From 2005 to 2008, Greenlam set up overseas subsidiaries in Singapore and the US.

In 2009, Greenlam started the commercial production of the second laminate unit at Nalagarh. In 2012, the company set up a subsidiary in the UK.

In 2014, Greenlam was demerged into a separate entity and listed on the National Stock Exchange (NSE) and the Bombay Stock Exchange (BSE).

In 2019, the company acquired Greenlam Decolan SA in Switzerland and Incorporated Greenlam South Limited (GSL). From 2016 to 2021 The company Commissioned multiple brownfield laminate capacities and acquired 74.91% equity share capital of HG Industries Limited (formerly Himalaya Granites Limited).

In 2022, Greenlam issued its first listed non-convertible debentures and raised Rs. 99 cr. In the same year, the company acquired the laminate plant in Prantij, Gujarat, and raised Rs. 195 cr. via a preferential issue of equity shares.

In 2023, Greenlam Industries commenced enhanced capacity of the laminate unit in Prantij, Commenced a greenfield plywood unit at Tindivanam, and Commenced a greenfield laminate unit at Naidupeta.

== Awards and recognitions ==
- Largest Exporter in the category of Decorative Laminates 2024
- Excellence award as highest exporter of Decorative Laminates for the years 2022 and 2023 from The Plastic Export Promotion Council (sponsored by the Ministry of Commerce & Industry, Department of Commerce, Government of India).
