= Delta Institute =

Description of think tank in the Netherlands

- Formation: October 2023
- Founder: Alexander Klöpping, Onno Eric Blom, Edial Dekker
- Type: Think tank
- Headquarters: Marineterrein, Amsterdam, Netherlands
- Director: Onno Eric Blom
- Website: www.deltainstituut.nl

Delta Institute is a Dutch think tank working on government digitization and innovation policy. The organization began in October 2023 as Recoding Government (Dutch: Herprogrammeer de Overheid), an initiative of Alexander Klöpping and tech entrepreneur Onno Eric Blom. It has operated under its current name since April 2026.

== Founding and manifesto ==
On 9 October 2023, Klöpping and Blom published an opinion piece in the newspaper NRC which said that the Dutch government's IT infrastructure was outdated, and argued that information technology is a core government task. On the same day they released the manifesto Recoding Government, which called for better pay and more policy influence for programmers inside government. The article reached the House of Representatives three days later, in a committee debate of the standing committee on Digital Affairs, where the state secretary promised a written response.

The group presented the manifesto to members of that committee on 13 February 2024. On 16 December 2024, committee members released the document Ons Digitaal Fundament (English: Our Digital Foundation), which proposed a central Digital Service. NOS and iBestuur both reported that the document came out of cooperation with the foundation. MP Barbara Kathmann called the manifesto "the stone in the pond" and credited it with pushing the House to press the cabinet for major IT reform. Klöpping currently sits on the organization's advisory board, whilst Blom runs the organisation. The coalition agreement of January 2026 announced a Dutch Digital Service, a competitive pay scale for IT specialists, mandatory review of IT projects above five million euros, and centralized digital procurement. The Dutch Digital Service launched in the summer of 2026.

== National AI Delta Plan ==
The idea for a National AI Delta Plan came up over dinner with minister of infrastructure and water management Vincent Karremans at the Ministry of Economic Affairs, in Summer 2025. Six tech entrepreneurs and researchers, Blom among them, wrote the plan; the foundation covered part of the cost. Karremans received it in November 2025. It runs to 52 recommendations, built with input from more than sixty experts. The newspaper Trouw reported that the Jetten cabinet folded the plan into the coalition agreement "almost word for word."

== National Agency for Disruptive Innovation ==
The foundation was one of the outside partners in a Ministry of Economic Affairs study of a National Agency for Disruptive Innovation (NADI), envisioned as a Dutch counterpart to DARPA. Minister Karremans sent the findings to the House of Representatives in February 2026 and left the decision on whether to actually establish it to the next cabinet. NADI was subsequently mentioned in the coalition agreement.

== Name change ==
In April 2026 the organization announced it would carry on as Delta Institute, with a broader thematic scope. Government documents have used that name since. The Ministry of Economic Affairs and Climate said the institute spent 2026 carrying out several actions from the AI Delta Plan, including work on an ELLIS Institute as a European AI research center. The foundation is based at the Marineterrein in Amsterdam.
