= Consoweld =

Consoweld or Consoweld Laminated Plastic is a type of High Pressure Laminate, similar to Formica decorative laminate. It was produced by the Consoweld Corporation (formerly Consolidated Papers, Inc.) of Wisconsin Rapids in the 1950s. Consoweld laminate was originally developed for several different products from gaskets to caskets during WWII. Starting in 1953, the company saw an opportunity in civilian applications producing Decorative Laminate for partitions and countertops. Throughout the next several decades, Consoweld was a major producer of Decorative Laminate, on par with Formica, to the extent that Sears & Roebuck carried some of their products in their catalog. In 1996, the profitable company was sold to Libby Owens Ford (subsequently Trinova Corporation with a Sterling Engineered Products subsidiary.)

== Uses ==
Consoweld, in common with similar products like Formica, had a wide variety of uses. During WWII, it was used in aircraft construction, house building and electrical applications. Starting in the 1950s, the main use, however, was as a worktop, tabletop, and wall partition, both commercially and for residential homes (the decorative finishes and patterns being more colorful). Midcentury design often featured Consoweld Decorative Laminate throughout a residential home, from kitchen countertops & tabletops to wall panels and furniture surfaces. Businesses also used Consoweld Decorative Laminate for countertops in Diners and for office furniture surfaces.

Although Consoweld advertisements often emphasized commercial use, especially early on, they had a wide selection of colorful colors and patterns for the home. As with many of the laminate products in the 1950s, their laminate fell out of favor in the 1990s and soon faded into history. Despite this event, Consoweld Decorative Laminate can still be found in use even to this day on countertops and furniture surfaces throughout the country, surviving the test of time.

In 2010, over 2,300 sq/ft of new old stock 1950s Consoweld and Formica laminate was unearthed in a warehouse and put up for sale, all or none for $10,000. A detailed article was written about this find by Retrorenovation, describing the fantastic find. Soon, this find also faded into history.

In 2022, with the resurgent popularity of retro laminate styles being reintroduced like WilsonArt's Boomerang, the previously mentioned large quantity of vintage laminate was found again in Portland, Oregon. It was brought down to Redlands, Ca. by Redlands Salvage and is now being sold on eBay and Etsy.
