= Durcon =

- Industry: Chemical resistant epoxy resin countertops and sinks
- Founded: 1963 in Detroit, Michigan, United States
- Founder: Jan Mueller and Robert Hackman
- Headquarters: Taylor, Texas, USA
- Area served: Global
- Website: durcon.com

Durcon Incorporated, a Wilsonart LLC company, is a global company headquartered in Taylor, Texas that manufactures and fabricates chemical resistant epoxy resin countertops and sinks for use in laboratories, classrooms and other research environments. and solid surface counter tops for the commercial construction market.

== Durcon facilities ==
Durcon's manufacturing facility occupies 120,000 square feet in Taylor, Texas. Durcon has sales and fabrication facilities in Canada, Poland, Malaysia and China to serve markets in Europe and Russia, the Middle East and Southeast Asia.

== Manufacturing ==
Durcon Epoxy Resin worksurfaces are thermosets cured through three stages. By combining two reactive materials – monolithic epoxy resin and the curing agent – with a catalyst and heat, the resin and curing agent react to result in the branching of chains. As curing continues, molecular weight accelerates causing viscosity to increase. Eventually, the material changes from a viscous liquid to a solid gel. The material is then placed into a curing oven to increase durability and solidity. The final stage of curing results in completion of the cross-linking process at which the average molecule weight diverges to infinity. Thermosets like epoxy resin possess good dimensional stability, thermal stability and chemical resistance.

== Growth ==
In 2011, Durcon moved all its U.S. operations to Taylor, resulting in an expansion of its facilities and 65 new jobs. "We went from learning there was a chance that we could lose 200 jobs to having a net gain of 65 jobs," Jason Ford, CEO of the Taylor Economic Development Corp. said. "We are incredibly excited to work with Durcon as it grows here."

In 2014, Durcon had invested more than $7.5 million in its Taylor facility. Durcon had increased its employees from 220 to 430, while still actively recruiting.

As of December 2025, Durcon has expanded its operation by 32,000 square feet (3,000 m^{2}).

== Ownership ==
- 1963 - Laboratory Service, Inc. is founded by Jan Mueller and Robert Hackman in Detroit, Michigan.
- 1975 - Laboratory Service, Inc. acquires the epoxy resin division of the Duriron Corporation of Dayton, Ohio. Laboratory Service, Inc. is renamed The Durcon Company.
- 2004 – Laboratory Tops acquires The Durcon Company and retains the Durcon name
- 2013 – Wilsonart LLC acquires Durcon Incorporated from Private Equity firm Quad-C Management

== Awards ==
- 2013 Economic Engine Award presented by Taylor Economic Development Corporation
- 2013 Employer Award of Excellence presented by the Texas Workforce Commission and Local Workforce Development Board
- Durcon named finalist for the 2013 Texas Workforce Solutions Employer of the Year
- 2013 Medium Business Export Award presented by The Austin Chamber of Commerce

== Charity contributions ==
Durcon partners with Scott & White Healthcare Foundation to initiate Durcon Dolls for Children program at Scott & White Hospital in Taylor, Texas on September 13, 2013. Durcon presented Scott & White with a $750 check to initiate the program, which provides children with hand-sewn dolls and markers for comfort and therapeutic value. Nurses and physicians use the doll to communicate with the children by asking them to point to the area on their dolls where they feel pain.

In 2013, Durcon made a monetary donation to World War II Veterans Honor Flight. The donation enabled Honor Flight Austin’s mission to transport World War II or terminally ill veterans to Washington D.C., allowing them to visit the memorials dedicated to honor their service and sacrifices.

Durcon provides volunteers for Habitat for Humanity, and to Shepherd’s Heart Pantry and holds annual food drives that collect over 2,000 lbs of canned and packaged goods.
