= Erik Scherder =

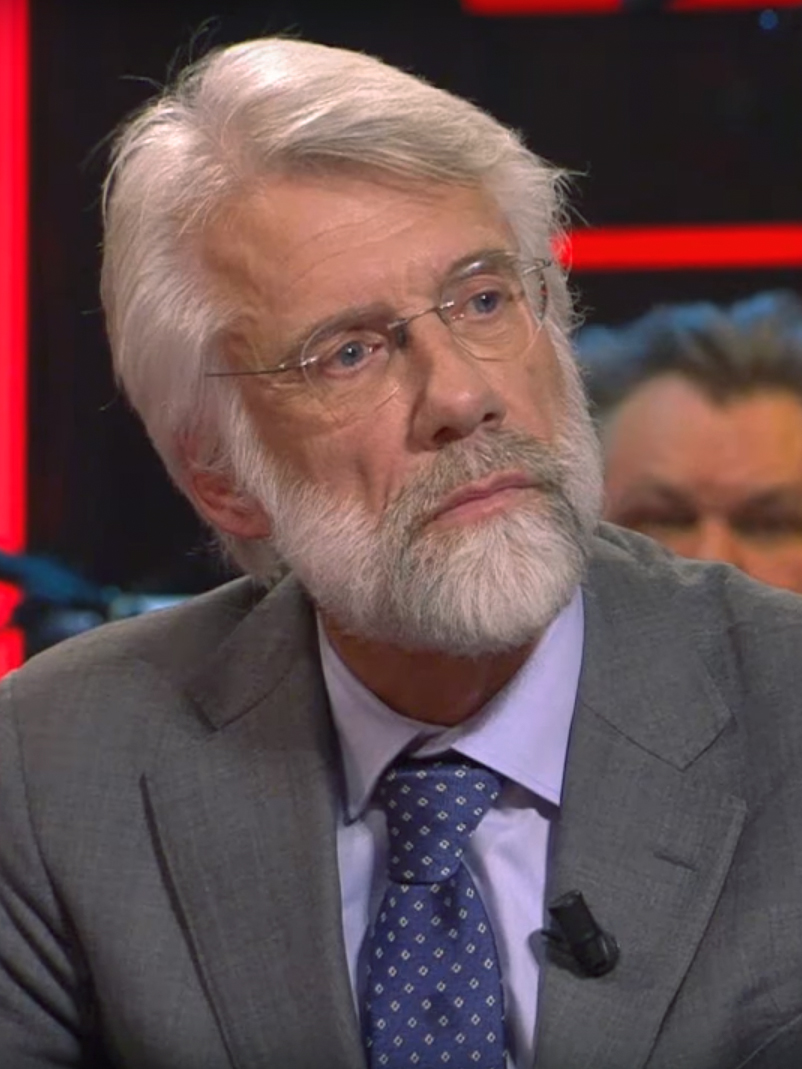
- Erik Scherder at De Wereld Draait Door, 2017
- Born: 1 December 1951 (age 74); Amsterdam, Netherlands
- Education: VU
- Scientific career
- Fields: Psychology

Erik Johan Anton (Erik) Scherder (born 1 December 1951) is a Dutch professor of neuropsychology at the Vrije Universiteit in Amsterdam (VU). Scherder became a physiotherapist in the late seventies after which he worked in the Valeriuskliniek in Amsterdam. Afterwards he studied for a doctoral degree at the Vrije Universiteit of Amsterdam with a specialization in neuropsychology, which he was awarded in 1995.

== Biography ==
In 2002 he was appointed as special professor at the VU, followed by a nomination for professor Bewegingswetenschappen (Human Movement Sciences) at the Rijksuniversiteit in Groningen (RuG). After a couple of years he returned to the VU in Amsterdam, where he leads the department clinical neuropsychology. Both universities awarded Scherder with special awards, such as RUG teacher of the year and the VU education award . Due to this he was invited to the Dutch television show De Wereld Draait Door and in 2015 three episodes of DWDD University, in which the malfunctions and diseases of the brain were the main topic.

In 2016 Scherder received the Betto Deelmanprijs, due to his exceptional efforts in the study of neuropsychology and his contribution to the subject of neuropsychology in the Netherlands'. On 26 April 2017 Scherder was appointed Officer in the Order of Orange-Nassau.
