= LuckyTV =

External videos
- The Art of Television Disassembly talk at TEDxBreda by Sander van de Pavert
- Time of my life parody video from LuckyTV, October 2016

LuckyTV, created by Sander van de Pavert (The Hague, 1976), is a Dutch series of short videos, mostly used as closure of daily TV-show De Wereld Draait Door on NPO 1. In these videos, recent news items (usually from the same day) are shown with the actual voices of the people in the video replaced with Van de Pavert's voice, often making the characters say ridiculous things. On a regular basis, items are edited into the video that weren't originally there, such as a monster at the wedding of British prince William and Kate Middleton.

In October 2016 LuckyTV received widespread attention after it released a parody video that made it appear that Donald Trump and Hillary Clinton were singing a duet of the song (I've Had) The Time of My Life during the second USA presidential debate. CNet contributor Chris Matyszczyk wrote that the video "offers the possibility of idyllic harmony where there is only conflict. That, of course, makes it comedy."

== History ==
Van de Pavert studied Graphic Design at the Willem de Kooning Academy in Rotterdam. His LuckyTV videos were first broadcast on national television in 2003, during Vara Laat. Later, the clips were shown in JENSEN! and, since 2005, De Wereld Draait Door.

== Returning items ==
- Willy & Máx: King Willem-Alexander often reappears in LuckyTV videos, as the anti-social party lover 'Willy'. When Willem-Alexander became king, he announced that one should simply refer to him as "Willem-Alexander" and not "William IV", which would be in line with his ancestors William I, II, and III. Lucky TV then made a video in which Willem-Alexander sings a song in which he wants to be called Willy: Noem me bij m'n eigen naam (call me by my own name). Since then, many videos were made in which "Willy" brings fireworks to official diplomatic visits, uses drugs, makes bad racist jokes and makes a mess of his annual speech to the government. His wife Queen Máxima often needs to hold him back, but regularly fails. In the videos, "Willy" speaks with a thick Haguish accent, including in English spoken videos.
- The Pope often reoccurs in videos as Darth Vader, who seems to love little children. Videos are almost always accompanied by music from Star Wars, regularly played by a group of musicians present at the scene.
- The NOS: Every now and then, a video is shown in which a reporter from the NOS News reads from his/her diary, telling what it is like to work for the national news station. It always ridicules the work of the journalists, complaining that they weren't taken seriously by either their boss, the interviewee or both, and regularly admitting that they did a lousy job on purpose because they found the job not worthy to be done.
