= FD Mediagroep =

- Headquarters: Amsterdam, Netherlands
- Area served: Netherlands
- Products: News
- Owner: HAL Investments
- Website: http://www.fdmg.nl/

The FD Mediagroep (also known as FDMG) is a Dutch company that owns Het Financieele Dagblad, BNR Nieuwsradio and Company.info. Since January 2010, HAL has owned 98.25% of the shares, after it took over the shares from Willem Sijthoff. The remaining 1.75% of the shares remained in the hands of the management of the FD Mediagroep.

The company has approximately 438 employees and had a turnover of €118.2 million in 2023 and an EBITDA of €17.2 million.
