= Coolblue =

Dutch e-commerce company

Coolblue B.V.
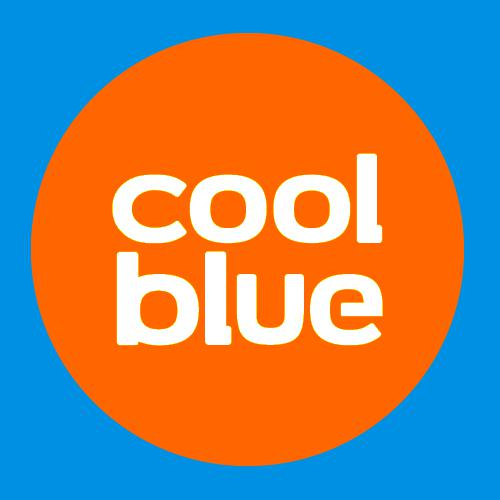
- Type: Private company
- Industry: Ecommerce
- Founded: 1999; 27 years ago
- Founders: Pieter Zwart (CEO); Paul de Jong; Bart Kuijpers
- Headquarters: Rotterdam, Netherlands
- Area served: Netherlands, Belgium, Germany
- Number of employees: 6114 (2022)
- Website: coolblue.nl

Coolblue B.V. is a Dutch e-commerce company that was founded in 1999 by Pieter Zwart (CEO), Paul de Jong, and Bart Kuijpers. The company operates in the Netherlands, Belgium, and Germany. As of 2025 it has 38 physical stores. In 2025, Coolblue reported a revenue of €2,56 billion, with a profit (EBITDA) of €86,5 million.

== History ==
The company was founded in 1999 by Pieter Zwart (CEO), Paul de Jong, and Bart Kuijpers. Coolblue operates in the Netherlands, Belgium, and Germany. The company started as separate webshops such as MP3man.nl, PDAshop.nl, and Laptopshop.nl, but all domains were merged into the Coolblue.nl domain in 2018.

The company currently has a Dutch, Belgian, and German website and has 36 physical stores in the Netherlands, Belgium and Germany. The company started with a distribution center in Capelle aan den IJssel, but moved to an entirely new distribution center in 2013. Over the years, this Tilburg distribution center expanded to its current size of 88,000 m2. In 2016, Coolblue launched its own van delivery service, CoolblueDelivers. The company further expanded its delivery proposition in 2018, when it introduced CoolblueBikes.

The name Coolblue is the opposite of Hot-Orange, which used to be an online warehouse that outsourced its operations to third parties, was financed externally, and didn't have a customer service. Coolblue's founders wanted to do the exact opposite, and reflected this intention in the name of their company.

Coolblue was voted best webshop in the Netherlands in the consumer electronics category by Thuiswinkel Awards in 2012 and 2013. From 2013 to 2022, Coolblue won the Tweakers award for Best Webshop of the Netherlands and Belgium every year. In July 2020, Coolblue expanded to Germany.

== Product assortment ==
Coolblue currently offers a wide assortment of consumer electronics. Additionally, it sells and installs solar panels and charging stations, and offers Home Office Stores for employers. In January 2021, Coolblue announced its energy label, Coolblue Energy.

== Owners ==
All shares were owned by the three founders. On 31 March 2016, HAL Investments acquired a 20% stake. On 6 July 2017, this was increased to 30.1% when the shares of two of the three founders were sold. On 14 June 2019, this percentage was increased to 49%, making HAL Investments Coolblue's main investor.
