= Blendle =

Dutch online news platform

Blendle B.V.
- Company type: Besloten vennootschap
- Website type: News, magazines
- Available in: Dutch
- Founded: 2013
- Headquarters: Utrecht, Netherlands
- Area served: Netherlands
- Owner: Cafeyn
- Founders: Marten Blankesteijn; Alexander Klöpping
- Website: blendle.com
- Advertising: No
- Registration: Yes
- Users: 550,000 (December 2015)
- Launched: 28 April 2014
- Current status: Online
- Native clients on: Android, iOS

Blendle is a Dutch online news platform that aggregates articles from a variety of newspapers and magazines and sells them on a pay-per-article basis. The key differences to similar websites are the participation by otherwise commercially unrelated news services in a single platform and the ability for registered users to easily pay a small price per article. It has been called an "iTunes for news" and a "micropayments-for-news pioneer" in various media.

The project was founded by Marten Blankesteijn and Alexander Klöpping. Blendle was backed by a Dutch government fund during its trial phase in April 2014. Half a year later, The New York Times Company and Axel Springer SE invested €3 million. In 2018, two other investors added $4 million. The service is directed at customers in the Netherlands and was previously available in Germany and the United States.

In June 2019, Klöpping stated that Blendle was still not profitable. At that time, it had 50 employees, and had paid out €8 million to news publishers in the five years since its launch. Klöpping also announced that Blendle would be changing its model to premium subscriptions instead of per-article micropayments. In July 2020, the service was sold to Cafeyn for an undisclosed amount. Six months later, Alexander Klöpping resigned from the group. The micro payment model was shut down in 2023.

== Service ==
Blendle offers users access to articles of newspapers and magazines which can be purchased individually, although entire issues can be purchased as well. The transaction of the former occurs automatically when the user opens an article. The price is then deducted from the user’s account balance, to which they added funds prior to the transaction. The service immediately reverses the transaction when the user closes the purchased article quickly after opening it or requests a refund which is only available for 24 hours after purchase. Purchased articles can be accessed at no additional charge.

The prices are determined by the publishers and range between €0.09 (snippets) and €1.99 (feature stories) and are often around €0.25, 30% of which is paid to Blendle. Users can top up their accounts manually or set up an automatic top-up.

=== Curation ===
Aside from offering access to articles and entire issues through which users can browse, the service also assembles articles according to section, provides general staff picks and has a list of trending articles. Users can subscribe to these sections, follow other users and recommend articles to their own followers. Users can also search for articles directly and set up keyword-related alerts.

=== Publishers ===
At launch, Blendle had agreements with 56 publishers. Since then it has increased that number to over 100 publishers. Most of the publishers are Dutch and German newspapers and magazines, but the service also lists several Belgian Dutch-language newspapers and magazines as well as a few newspapers and magazines from English-speaking countries. In September 2015, Blendle has expanded the service to Germany and has so far concluded agreements with 37 German publishers. In the US platform, Blendle has expanded to over 25 US-based publications. In March 2022, the Publisher DPG Media announced, following a court decision in his favor, that his titles would no longer be available on the digital newsstand Blendle.
