= Consolidated Papers, Inc. =

Defunct paper manufacturer in the United States of America

Consolidated Papers, Inc. (CPI) was a paper manufacturer headquartered in Wisconsin Rapids, Wisconsin. It was incorporated as the Consolidated Water Power Company on 16 July 1894. Over time it expanded to include operations in Biron, Stevens Point, Whiting, Appleton and Port Arthur, Ontario. The company was an innovator in the production of coated paper. In 2000, the company was bought by the Finnish company Stora Enso. The former Consolidated paper mills were sold in 2007 to NewPage, which was in turn acquired by Verso in 2015.

== Beginnings ==
Wisconsin Rapids (previously Grand Rapids) sits on what was once called the Grand Rapids of the Wisconsin River. The Wisconsin River drops twenty-seven feet at the main rapids and sixty feet overall. Early settlers used islands in the rapids to develop water power for a flour mill, machine shop, saw mill and the Grand Rapids Pulp and Paper Co. In 1888, the Centralia Pulp and Water Power Company began operations 2.5 miles down river from the Grand Rapids, expanding to making paper in 1891.

The Consolidated Water Power Company was incorporated on 16 July 1894 with the goal of consolidating the six companies using portions of the water power of the Grand Rapids. After disputes, Nels Johnson and J.D. Witter, the last two original owners, purchased the remainder of the company in 1901, renaming it the Consolidated Water Power and Paper Company the following year. Witter died in 1902, followed by Johnson nine months later. Witter’s son-in-law, George W. Mead, took over as president. The 2,000 foot long dam was completed in March 1904. It was made from stone filled timber cribs with hemlock beams. The mill became operational on April 26, 1904 and began producing paper on June 3. An early client was the Methodist Sunday Schools, which used sixty tons of paper monthly.

== Expansion ==
In 1911, Consolidated took over the nearby Biron mill from the Grand Rapids Pulp and Paper Co., which became the Biron Division. In 1916, it absorbed the Interlake Pulp & Paper Company of Appleton, which became the Interlake Division. In 1918, the company built a hydroelectric dam at Stevens Point, adding paper machines in 1919. With the acquisition of the Newaygo Timber Company in 1920, Consolidated expanded its timber holdings from Wisconsin and Minnesota to Ontario. In 1922, the company purchased a pulp and paper mill in Port Arthur, Ontario. In 1929, the Wisconsin Rapids and Biron mills converted from newsprint to book and writing papers.

In 1935, Consolidated produced the first coated paper manufactured in a single high-speed operation at the Wisconsin Rapids Division, using the Consolidated Massey coater. Coated papers would become the focus of company operations over the next decade. In 1937, Life Magazine became the company’s largest client, with inexpensive coated paper making the magazine stand out. In 1942, the Du Bay hydroelectric plant was completed, providing additional power for company expansion. During World War II, the company developed exceptionally strong plastics from wood byproducts for use in airplanes. The resulting Plastics Division became the Consoweld Corporation in 1954. In 1945, the company acquired the Wisconsin River Paper and Pulp Company in nearby Whiting, which became the Wisconsin River Division. A merger with Ahdawagam Paper Products Company in 1948 expanded the product line to include paperboard containers and cartons. By 1951, the company had completed hydroelectric power sites at Petenwell and Castle Rock, while also building the Mead Inn.

Throughout the 1950s, the company continued to focus on coated paper, remaining a leader in the process through technological innovation. In 1962, the company changed its name to Consolidated Papers, Inc. In the late 1960s, Consolidated constructed a kraft pulp mill. In 1970, they purchased Castle Rock Container Company, a corrugated container plant. In 1984, Consolidated launched a $215 million expansion of the Biron mill. In 1985, Consoweld was sold off to LOF Plastics. With an ongoing capital program and fiscal discipline, the company was able to remain strong despite its relatively small size. For example, the early 1990s saw a $500 million addition to the Wisconsin Rapids Division and a $135 million expansion at Stevens Point.

In the robust mid-1990s economy, the company acquired Niagara of Wisconsin Paper Corporation, Lake Superior Paper Industries and Superior Recycled Fiber Industries. Throughout the 1990s, the company was listed in the Fortune 500 Largest U.S. Industrial Corporations and owned over 600,000 acres of forest land. By 1995, the company had earnings of $229 million and sales of $1.58 billion. With the purchase of Repap Corp. in 1997, the company’s share of the U.S. coated paper market grew to 20%.

== Sale of the Company ==
The late 1990s saw decreased earnings, due to rising pulp cost, global overcapacity and foreign competition. This led to cost cutting and the layoff of 700 workers in 2000. Under pressure from global consolidation in the industry, the company agreed to acquisition by the Finnish company, Stora Enso in 2000 for $4.4 billion.

== Sources ==
- Consolidated Water Power Company : one hundred years of water power, 1894-1994. The Company, Wisconsin Rapids, WI, 1994.
- Consolidated Water Power & Paper Company. 50 years of progress. Consolidated Water Power & Paper Company, Wisconsin Rapids, WI, 1954.
- Decker, A. Along the Wisconsin River: descriptive of the Wisconsin River Valley, its resources, industries and opportunities. Evening Wisconsin Co., Milwaukee, WI, [1907?] .
- Engel, Dave. The age of paper : consolidation of the water power at Wisconsin Rapids, 1886-1904. South Wood County Historical Corp., Wisconsin Rapids, WI, 1986.
