= Blaise Pascal College =

High school in Zaandam, Netherlands

Location
- Pascalstraat 4 Zaandam; Netherlands
- Coordinates: 52.45440°N 4.83189°E

Information
- School type: Protestant secondary school
- Principal: Ellen Veenker-Aalbers
- Website: pascalcollege.nl

Blaise Pascal College is a high school in Zaandam, Netherlands. It offers vwo at atheneum and Gymnasium level, as well as havo. The school's Christian identity, formulated in the 20th century by orthodox protestants, is based on Reformed thinking. The school was founded in 1957.

== Notable students ==
- Mathijs Bouman
- Barbara Visser
