= Currency Exchange International =

American foreign exchange company

Currency Exchange International, Corp
- Type: Public company
- Traded as: TSX: CXI; OTCID Basic: CURN
- Industry: Financial services
- Founded: 1998
- Headquarters: Orlando, Florida, United States
- Products: Foreign Currency Exchange
- Number of employees: 200 +
- Subsidiaries: Exchange Bank of Canada
- Website: www.ceifx.com

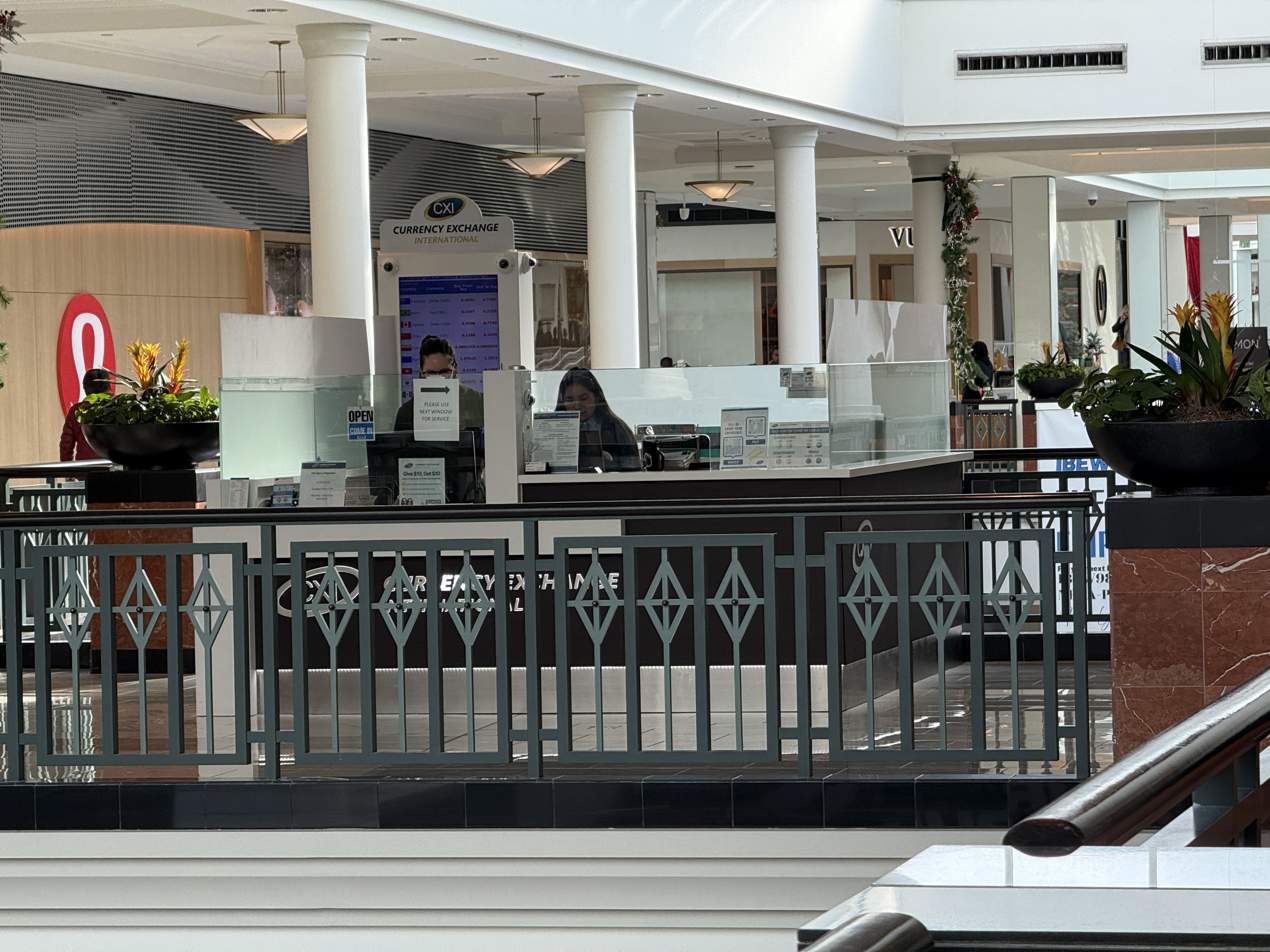
Currency Exchange International kiosk in the King of Prussia Mall in King of Prussia, Pennsylvania

Currency Exchange International (CXI) is a foreign currency exchange company in the United States.

The company provides wholesale services for financial institutions and other foreign currency exchange companies as well as retail services at branch locations. The company's products and services include the exchange of foreign currencies; wire transfer payments; purchase and sale of foreign bank drafts and international traveler's cheques; and foreign cheque clearing. It also provides related products and services, such as the license of proprietary FX software applications delivered on CEIFX.

The company is primarily a business-to-business wholesale provider of foreign exchange services to U.S. and Canadian financial institutions and Money Services businesses. The company is based out of Orlando, Florida with its subsidiary Currency Exchange International of Canada Corp based in Toronto, Ontario. CXI is publicly traded company on the Toronto Stock Exchange with the ticker symbol TSX:CXI.

== History ==
Randolph W Pinna was the president and CEO at Foreign Currency Exchange Bank of Ireland Group until 2007. In 2007, Randolph became president and CEO of Currency Exchange International, Corp. Wells Fargo purchased Foreign Currency Exchange Corp from Bank of Ireland Group in 2011.

== Application For Schedule 1 Bank in Canada - Exchange Bank of Canada ==
In October 2012, CXI applied to the Minister of Finance in Canada for letters patent continuing its wholly owned subsidiary, Currency Exchange International of Canada Corp. as a bank under Canada's Bank Act. The subsidiary would carry on business in Canada under the name of Exchange Bank of Canada in English and Banque de change du Canada in French, and its head office would be located in Toronto.

As a bank, it is looking to provide a range of foreign currency and related products and services to banks, in the form of a "Banker's Bank".

In September 2016, Currency Exchange International of Canada Corp. was given the order to commence and carry on business as Exchange Bank of Canada (EBC), in English, and Banque de change du Canada, in French, and is now operating as a Canadian Schedule 1 bank. The order to continue as a federally regulated financial institution is made by Canada's Superintendent of Financial Institutions (OSFI) after the Letters Patent are issued by the Minister of Finance.
