= Exchange Bank of Canada =

- Formerly: Currency Exchange International of Canada Corp (2011–2016)
- Company type: Subsidiary
- Industry: Financial services
- Founded: 2016
- Headquarters: Toronto, Ontario, Canada
- Products: Foreign currency exchange international payments
- Parent: Currency Exchange International
- Website: www.ebcfx.com

Exchange Bank of Canada (EBC; French: Banque de change du Canada) is a Schedule 1 domestic bank in Canada. EBC is a subsidiary of Currency Exchange International and specializes in wholesale foreign exchange solutions to financial institutions and businesses.

== History ==
In October 2012, Currency Exchange International, Corp. applied to the Minister of Finance in Canada for letters patent continuing its wholly owned subsidiary, Currency Exchange International of Canada Corp. as a bank under the Bank Act. The company was to change its name to Exchange Bank of Canada in English and Banque de change du Canada in French, and with its head office in Toronto, Ontario.

In September 2016, Currency Exchange International of Canada Corp. was given the order to commence and carry on business as Exchange Bank of Canada (EBC), in English, and Banque de change du Canada, in French, and is now operating as a Canadian Schedule 1 bank. The order to continue as a federally regulated financial institution was made by Canada's Superintendent of Financial Institutions (OSFI) after the Letters Patent were issued by the Minister of Finance.

== Products and services ==
Exchange Bank of Canada's products include the exchange of foreign currencies, international wire transfers, sale of foreign bank drafts, and foreign cheque clearing. EBC does not take deposits or make loans or deal directly with retail customers, only establishing direct relationships dealing with businesses and financial institutions.

== See also ==
- List of banks and credit unions in Canada
