= Nico Dijkshoorn =

Dutch author

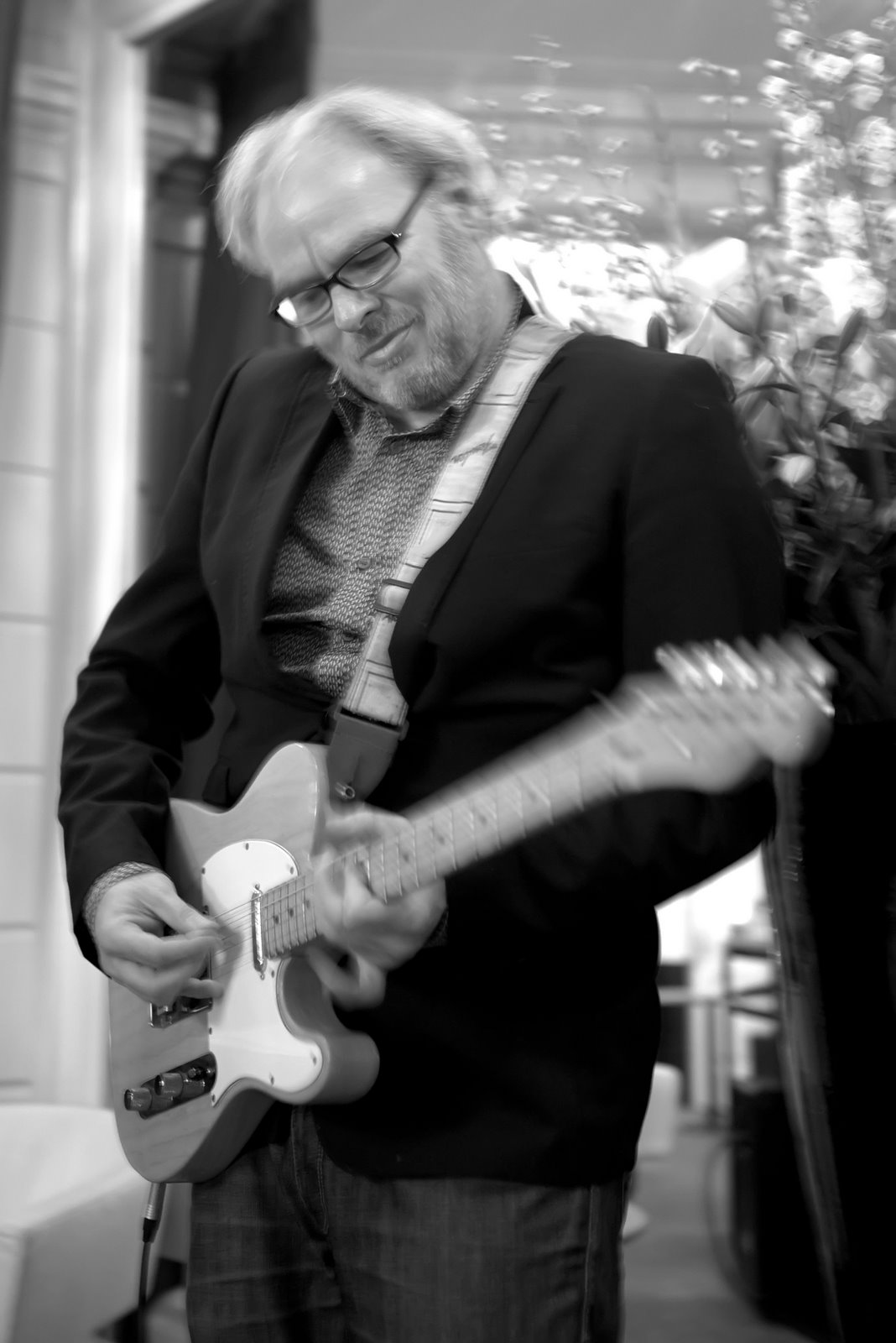
- Nico Dijkshoorn in 2009
- Born: Nicolaas Dijkshoorn; 15 May 1960 (age 65); Amsterdam, Netherlands
- Occupation: Author · Columnist · Blogger · Poet · Musician
- Years active: 1999–present
- Website: Official site

Nicolaas "Nico" Dijkshoorn (born 15 May 1960) is a Dutch author, columnist, blogger, poet and musician.
