= Alexander Klöpping =

Dutch entrepreneur

Alexander Paul Klöpping
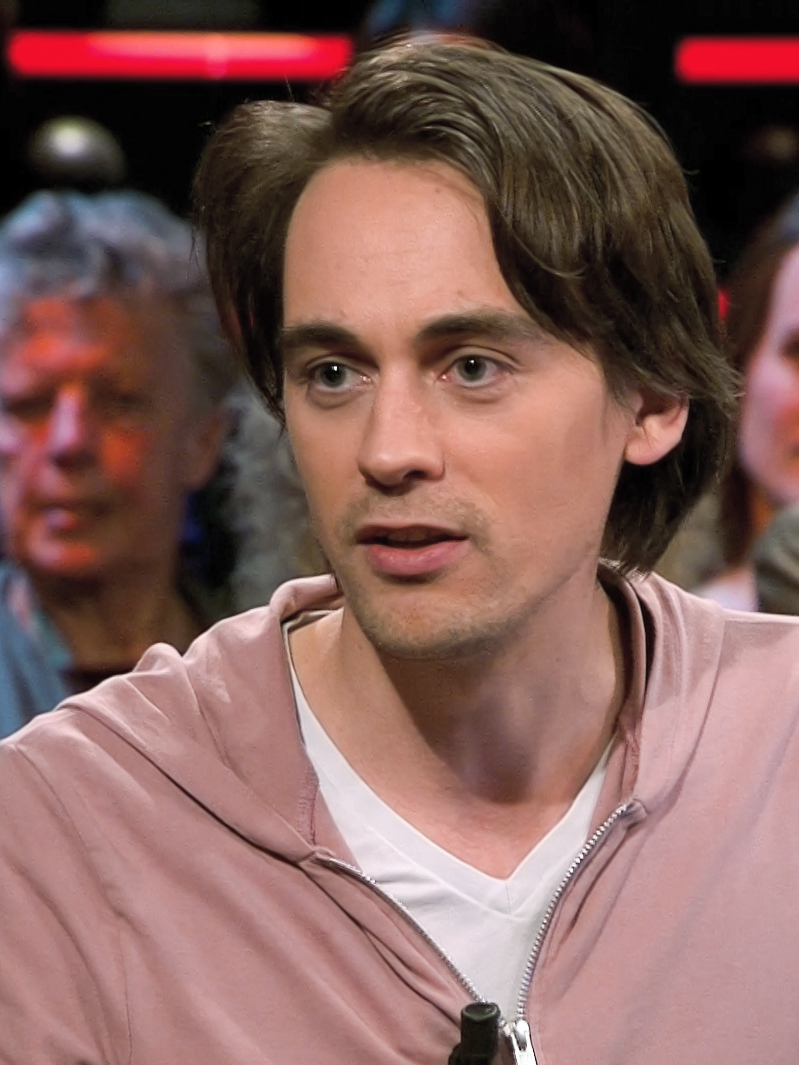
- Alexander Klöpping in 2018
- Born: 21 January 1987 (age 39); Oss, Netherlands
- Occupations: entrepreneur, consultant, columnist, student
- Years active: 2003
- Known for: IT consultant for Dutch-language media
- Television: De Wereld Draait Door
- Website: alexanderklopping.nl

Alexander Paul Klöpping (Dutch pronunciation: [aːlɛkˈsɑndər ˈpʌul ˈklʏpɪŋ]; born 21 January 1987) is a Dutch internet entrepreneur specializing in consumer electronics, blogging, and is also a print and online journalist and speaker. Klöpping studies new media at the University of Amsterdam and is a self-described nerd. He is consulted by Dutch-language media for his expertise. He himself states that his expertise is "relative".

Klöpping started an online company, The Gadget Company, at 16 years of age. In 2005, he went to the United States to study, for half a year at a university-oriented to the Democratic Party and another half year at one oriented towards the Republican Party and participated in political campaigns of both parties. He wrote a thesis about the Barack Obama campaign. Starting in March 2008, he wrote for Dutch financial journalist Jort Kelder's website 925.nl, became editor a few months later and stayed in that position until June 2009.

He also writes articles for Dutch media Emerce, NU.nl, NRC Next (once every two weeks on Wednesdays), Vrij Nederland, NTR Schooltv and STER Nieuws.

Klöpping has been working on Dutch television since 2009. He produced and presented Internet news for Bij ons in de BV and NTR School TV. He is best known for appearing regularly as a technology expert on the talk show De Wereld Draait Door. There, he has demonstrated items including the iPad and Kinect, and commented on the rise of social media, WikiLeaks, the Anonymous cyber-attacks, and Facebook privacy policy. Since the launch of the talk show Eva in 2024, Klöpping has also made regular appearances on this programme, as an expert on artificial intelligence. He is an advisor for Mediafonds and member of the jury on TV Lab.

In 2011, he published the book Wikileaks, alles wat je niet mocht weten ("Wikileaks, everything you weren't allowed to know").

In 2013, he joined the Committee of Recommendation of Dutch whistleblower foundation Publeaks that launched a whistleblowing initiative in September 2013, based on the GlobaLeaks software.

In 2013, Klöpping founded the Universiteit van Nederland ("University of the Netherlands"), that organizes and publishes lectures. That year, Klöpping himself taught three classes on the television series DWDD University about the history, present and future of Silicon Valley. Klöpping is a co-founder of Blendle, a platform with articles of thirty major Dutch newspapers and magazines. At Blendle, launched in April 2014, readers originally paid per article. In 2019, Blendle switched to a subscription model. In July 2020, Blende was sold to the French news platform Cafeyn. On January 7, 2021, Klöpping announced that he would leave Blendle at the end of that month.

Since 2016, he also hosts a podcast "Een podcast over media" ("A podcast about media") with De Correspondent co-founder Ernst Jan Pfauth, where they talk about media and technology together. In 2023, Klöpping and Pfauth founded POM.press, a publishing house that focuses on books about media, technology and the impact of technological change on society.

== Publications ==
- WikiLeaks. Alles wat je niet mocht weten, Prometheus. 2011. ISBN 978-90-446-1792-4
