= Exhaled breath condensate =

Product collected for use in breath tests

Exhaled breath condensate (EBC) is the exhalate from breath, that has been condensed, typically via cooling using a collection device (commonly to 4 °C or subzero temperatures using a refrigerating device). EBC reflects changes in the respiratory fluid that lines the airways and is an inexpensive, non-invasive tool that has potential for scientific research. Despite its promises, it has not been proven for screening or diagnosing diseases of the lung and other conditions, yet. It has long been appreciated that the exhaled breath is saturated by water vapour (e.g. by wind musical instrument players), but using it for studies of the lung was probably first described in the Russian scientific literature.

== Overview ==
Exhaled breath condensate reflects not only the composition of the airway lining fluid and alveoli. EBC may also mix with salivary and gastric droplets. In addition, volatile gases arising from the alveoli, lower and upper airway wall as well as oral cavity dissolve into the exhaled water vapour and influence its pH. The primary constituents of EBC include:

1. Aerosolised particles of airway lining fluid collected from the airways induced by airflow, probably by turbulence.
2. Water vapour condensation produced around the aerosolised particles
3. Water-soluble volatile gases dissolved into the water vapor condensate

As EBC reflects the composition of the airway lining fluid, it contains most molecules found in the airway, but these are probably diluted by water vapour. Thus, these can range from simple ions, e.g. H+ measured as pH, hydrogen peroxide, proteins, cytokines, eicosanoids, and macromolecules such as mucin, phospholipids and DNA. Dilution is an issue that is a problem with all methods of sampling the airway and lungs including sputum collection and bronchoalveolar lavage. Suggestions to allow for dilution include using a denominator such as protein, urea or conductivity, but no single method is universally accepted at present.

Increasing evidence indicates that in disease states EBC contains molecules reflective of that disease or greater concentrations of particular markers. For example, patients with gastroesophageal reflux disease have been demonstrated to have pepsin (usually localised to the stomach) in their EBC. Patients with COPD and asthma have been demonstrated to have increased levels of reactive oxygen species and histamine after bronchial challenge (Ratnawatti 2008).

The content of exhaled breath condensate, however, is also strongly affected by physiological factors, such as diet, physical exercise and even pregnancy may affect mediator concentrations.

== Collection devices ==
The chemical properties of the collection device will influence the device and its characteristics. Some devices can contaminate the sample, or react with oxidative markers particularly if containing metals

Examples of devices include:

1. Simple, custom-made. These include glass tubes cooled by ice, Teflon tubing in ice or in dry-ice or water-cooled glass condensers.
2. Refrigeration systems. These allow the regulation of the collection temperature usually within a pre-set range.
3. Disposable exhaled breath condensate collector. This device is placed inside a metal sleeve which has been chilled in a freezer. The collection temperature gradually increases as it is used at room temperature. After use the disposable condensation tube inside is then removed from the external metal sleeve and the sleeve is returned to the freezer. Condensate is extracted from the walls of the condensation tube using a plunger and swept into a fluid pool for analysis.

== Potential applications ==
EBC has potential uses in combination with exhaled breath analysis. There is significant interest in exhaled nitric oxide analysis in conjunction with EBC analysis but in addition, the analysis of the breath has many applications. Well known examples include and estimation of the breath alcohol level, but others included non-invasive measurements to estimate blood glucose, and well as using it for diagnosing other systemic and local lung diseases, such as lung cancer.
