= Empire Broadcasting Corporation =

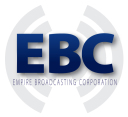
- Company type: Privately held
- Headquarters: Ballston Spa, New York
- Products: Radio
- Website: www.empirebroadcasting.net

Empire Broadcasting Corporation was a local media and entertainment company. Assets included four radio station frequencies in the Capital Region of New York.

Empire sold the last of its assets in October 2019.

== Former Stations ==
- WABY 900 AM in Watervliet, New York.
- WSSV 1160 AM in Mechanicville, New York.
- W291BY 106.1 FM in Albany, New York.
- WPTR 1240 AM in Schenectady, New York.
