= Trespa =

Trespa is the brand name of a type of high-pressure laminate (HPL) plate manufactured by Trespa International BV, based in Weert, the Netherlands. Their panels are used for exterior cladding, decorative facades and interior surfaces. It is composed of decorative acrylic or melamine outer surfaces with a core of woodbased fibres or Kraft paper saturated with phenolic resin.

== History ==
The company was founded by Hermann Krages (1909-1992), the son of a Bremen merchant in wood and fibreboard and the brother of the racer Louis Krages. He is known mostly today for his speculation on the German stock market. Krages initially was given a fiberboard plant in the Ore Mountains by his father, which he lost at the end of WWII. He then moved to Scheuerfeld where he acquired the Berger paper mill and began the "Deutsche Duroleum Gesellschaft", making fiberboard plates again. He expanded with new factories in Etzbach, Höxter an der Weser, Leutkirch im Allgäu and in Bremen. The company in Weert was founded in 1960.

Initially the company focused mainly on the sale and storage of panels produced in the German plant at Leutkirch. Gradually it switched to the production of hardboard for mattresses. This activity was later incorporated into the company Thermopal after Krages sold his holdings due to his stock market speculation in the 1960s. In 1964 the name changed to "Weerter Plastics Industry" (“Weerter Kunststoffen Fabrieken”, or WKF). In 1967, the company was acquired by Hoechst, which used its product for surfaces in its laboratories. In 1991 the company passed to HAL Holding NV.

== Manufacture ==
Trespa plate is made by compressing impregnated paper or wood fibers and epoxy, phenolic or polypropylene resin at high pressure and high temperature. A special surface made with Electronic Beam Curing (EBC), a coating technique developed by Trespa, ensures durability and scratch resistance. Due to the ability to add colored pigments to the surface during curing, a variety of colors are possible. The production technique for the plates, which are made of wood, is also called "Dry Forming" technology. In this technique, cheaper pre-pregs instead of the more expensive impregnated paper layers in the production of fiber boards is applied. These prepregs consist of wood fibers and thermosetting resins. This technique was applied for the first time in 1984. Because the surface of Trespa Plate has a dense molecular coating, it is virtually impervious to weather (temperature, UV radiation and humidity). Also, any contamination, such as graffiti, can be removed quite easily. Because of these advantages, the material has been popular since the 1980s in the production of laboratory surfaces and outdoor signage, but also for shower stalls and toilet cubicles in educational, hospital, and campground facilities.

A new production line, EBC 2, was completed in 2015 to improve the quality of Trespa panel surfaces and increase production.

Today Trespa brings HPL Trespa panels under various brand names, with different qualities for indoor and outdoor applications, such as Trespa Virtuon for indoor applications, Trespa TopLabPLUS, Trespa TopLab BASE, Trespa TopLab VERTICAL, and newly introduced in 2022, Trespa TopLab PLUS ALIGN for laboratory, Trespa Meteon and Pura NFC for outdoor applications.
