= Electronic beam curing =

Electronic Beam curing (EBC) is a surface curing process in the manufacture of high pressure laminate (HPL) boards. The process applies color to a single sheet of Kraft paper which is adhered to a HPL board in such a way that it will keep its color durably while remaining scratch-resistant. Unlike other HPL creation methods, EBC does not use heat.

The EBC machine used in the curing process gives the finished HPL boards a surface that is both color-fade resistant and has a high resistance to damage. The process works by first mixing color pastes to the desired color and then applying it to a single sheet of kraft paper. This substrate is then put in the EBC machine together with a protective foil. In the machine this sheet is then shot with electrons at such high velocity that the color impregnated paper hardens almost instantly. After being stored in a temperature-controlled room for a short duration the sheets are ready to be adhered to unfinished HPL boards in a process called dry forming.
