= Maica Laminates =

High-pressure laminate producer in Malaysia

Maica Laminates Sdn Bhd is the first high-pressure laminate (HPL) manufacturer in Malaysia. It is one of the earliest local-foreign joint venture manufacturing companies in Penang.

== History ==
Maica Laminates was formed in 1968 as a joint venture between a Malaysian investor and a premier Japanese manufacturer, Aica Kogyo. Aica Kogyo is certified as an 'Aichi Quality Company', which the Aichi Prefecture has certified as "superior manufacturing companies within the prefecture".

The company's products are exported worldwide. The company has several OEM customers in the local and foreign market.

Maica's main sales arm in Malaysia is Maica Corporation, incorporated in 1982, and to date comprises eight sales and distribution branches in the two countries. Their manufacturing company also handles OEM and export markets.

The company achieved ISO 9002 in 1995, and upgraded in the year 2003 to ISO 9001:2000. In 2009, the company renewed its ISO certification, this time to the new ISO 9001:2008. It has not one, but two ISO certifications, one from UKAS and another from Standard Malaysia. All certificates based on Maica Laminates official website and printed company profiles.

== Products ==
Maica products consist of High-Pressure Laminates and Compact laminates. Under these two categories, high pressure decorative laminates may also be custom-print products that do not conform to the standard designs, which is especially catered to interior designers and architects inspired to have customized designs in their works. There are also chemical grade products which are commonly used in laboratories.

== Quality certificates ==
Maica Laminates products have received various certifications related to the high-pressure laminates and compact laminates products and industry. These include the European Standard EN438 and some other certifications for anti-bacteria, anti-fungi, termite resistance, and chemical resistance.

Since 2008, Maica has obtained two "green" certificates for its laminate products, the Singapore Green Label certificate which is one of the recognized Ecolabel under the Global Ecolabelling Network, and GREENGUARD.

== Awards ==
- November 2006 - 2 awards by the Institute of Interior Designers: The Industry Service Excellence Award and The Interior Products Award
- 2008: Silver award for the Open Booth Category at Malaysia's Interior Lifestyle Showcase, Putra World Trade Centre (PWTC).
- 2009: Silver Award, Best Booth Award, Open Booth Category in 2009.
