= Het Financieele Dagblad =

Dutch newspaper

- Type: Daily newspaper
- Format: Berliner
- Owner(s): FD Mediagroep
- Editor: Perry Feenstra
- Founded: 15 September 1943
- Political alignment: Centre-Right
- Headquarters: Amsterdam
- Circulation: 121.000 (2024)
- Price: €4,60 (2025)
- ISSN: 1388-4425
- Website: fd.nl

Het Financieele Dagblad (Dutch pronunciation: [ət ˈfinɑɲɕeːlə ˈdɑɣblɑt]; lit. 'The Financial Daily Newspaper') is a daily Dutch newspaper focused on business and financial matters. The paper was established in 1943. The company is headquartered in Amsterdam. It was among the newspapers participating in the Panama Papers investigation.

The paper began publishing a personal finance weekly supplement called FD Geld in 2007. The supplement ceased publication in 2009.
