= BNR Nieuwsradio =

Dutch radio station

Netherlands
- Frequencies: Central Netherlands: 100 MHz; Groningen: 89.6 MHz; Rotterdam/Breda/Maastricht/Zeeland: 91.4 MHz; Overijssel/Friesland/Drenthe: 95.4 MHz

Programming
- Language: Dutch
- Format: All-news radio

Ownership
- Owner: FD Mediagroep

History
- First air date: September 21, 1998

Links
- Webcast: Listen Live; Watch Live
- Website: www.bnr.nl

BNR Nieuwsradio is an all-news radio station in the Netherlands. The station provides domestic, regional and international news with live news bulletins every half-hour.
