= Wilsonart =

Manufacturer of composite materials

Wilsonart is a global manufacturer and distributor of high pressure laminates and other engineered composite materials, used in furniture, office and retail space, countertops, worktops and other applications. Headquartered in Temple, Texas, Wilsonart was founded by Ralph Wilson Sr. in 1956. The company sells decorative laminates and other engineered surfaces under the Wilsonart brand and international brands Arborite, Polyrey, and Resopal.

== History ==
Wilsonart founder Ralph Wilson moved to Texas to retire after suffering a heart attack in the early 1950s. Instead, he was encouraged by American Desk owner Arthur P. Brashear Sr., to open a laminate company next door to American Desk's school desk factory in Temple, Texas. He did, forming Ralph Wilson Plastics Company (RWP), later Wilsonart International, in 1956. At the time there were 16 competitors in the decorative laminate industry, including Formica, which held 65% of the market. RWP became a publicly held corporation in 1964 with an initial offering of 290,000 shares at $15.
In 1960, Dr. Ralph Wilson Jr. left his dental practice in Los Angeles and moved to Temple to join RWP as Executive Vice President. Upon the death of his father, he became President of RWP, and served on the board of directors of Dart until its merger with Kraft Inc. in 1986. When Premark International was created as a spinoff of Dart and Kraft, he was named group vice-president of the company, and president of the decorative products group. He retired in 1989.

Bill Reeb served as president of Wilsonart from 1995 to 2005. During his time as president, the company doubled its revenue. He formalized the mission of the company and put it in simple terms: "Serve the Customer. Serve the Enterprise. Serve the People".

Bill DiGaetano, a 33-year veteran of Wilsonart, served from 2005 until he retired in 2011. Previous executive VP and President of Herman Miller NA Office Environments Kristen Manos served as President from 2011 until 2014.

In 2013, Wilsonart International was established as an independent, global organization and announced the appointment of Timothy J. O'Brien as President and Chief Operating Officer.

Efficient distribution of its product has always been a main competitive differentiator for Wilsonart. In its early days, the company offered faster product delivery than any competitor – promising to deliver almost any product within 10 days, compared to as much as 25 days for Formica and other competitors. This was accomplished through a network of regional warehouses that provided one-day delivery to distributors. To better service fabricators and installers, Wilsonart opened its first metropolitan distribution center in Atlanta in 1970. The company opened several additional facilities via acquisition and new building – there are currently 19 markets with company-owned distribution.

== Manufacturing ==
Wilsonart's first manufacturing facility was built in Temple, Texas in 1956, directly across the street from its first customer, American Desk. A plant in Fletcher, North Carolina as added in 1979 to meet the increasing demand for product. In 1986, a new adhesive manufacturing and R&D facility, named "Temple North" opened in Temple, Texas. The original plant was renamed Temple South.

In 2000, Wilsonart officially opened its first manufacturing facility in Shanghai, China, a 100,000-square-foot facility in the Qingpu District.

== Acquisitions ==
In 1966, Dart Industries (formerly Rexall Drug) acquired RWP, and supported growth of its plastics business by purchasing a delivery fleet, fifty-eight thousand square feet of building space, and a fourth laminate press in its Temple plant.

In 1966, Dart Industries added adhesives manufacturing to the company's product portfolio with the purchase of Southern General Adhesives located in Denham Springs, Louisiana.

In 1980, Dart Industries merged with Kraft Foods to become Dart and Kraft, Inc. In November, 1986, Dart and Kraft, Inc. split into Kraft, Inc. and spin-off Premark International, Inc. The spinoff included four businesses: Tupperware plastic food storage containers, Hobart and Vulcan-Hart commercial food equipment, West Bend appliances and exercise equipment and Wilsonart plastic laminates. In 1999, Premark was acquired by Illinois Tool Works, Inc. (ITW).

Wilsonart purchased Suncraft Moldings in 1990 and introduced Custom Edges under the brand name Perma-Edge. In 2012, private equity investment firm Clayton, Dubilier & Rice (CD&R) acquired a majority ownership stake in Wilsonart, investing $395 million to form a new, independent enterprise operating as Wilsonart International Holdings, LLC. ITW retained an ongoing ownership stake.
In 2013, Wilsonart acquired Taylor, Texas-based Durcon Incorporated, a manufacturer of laboratory-grade countertops and work surfaces worldwide. Durcon operates as an independent business unit of Wilsonart.

== The Wilson House ==
This 3,000-square-foot model home was built by Ralph Wilson Sr., founder of Wilsonart in 1959 in Temple, Texas. Together with his daughter Bonnie McIninich, Wilson created the home to serve as an experimental showcase for Wilsonart (then Ralph Wilson Plastics). Experimental uses for laminate appeared throughout the home including kitchen and bath cabinets, shower stalls and walls, using laminates in place of traditional building materials like drywall, wallpaper, paint, wood, ceramic tile and linoleum. The doorless garage, its walls covered with new grades of laminate, allowed Wilson to test his products' durability.
The Wilson house served as Wilson Sr.'s private residence from 1959 until his death in 1972. In 1997, the home was purchased from Wilson Sr.'s widow, Sunny Wilson, and restored to its original appearance in 1959. In 1998, the home was named to the National Register of Historic Places for its innovative use of laminate technology. Today, the home serves as a museum and corporate archive.
