= Wim Pijbes =

Dutch art historian (born 1961)

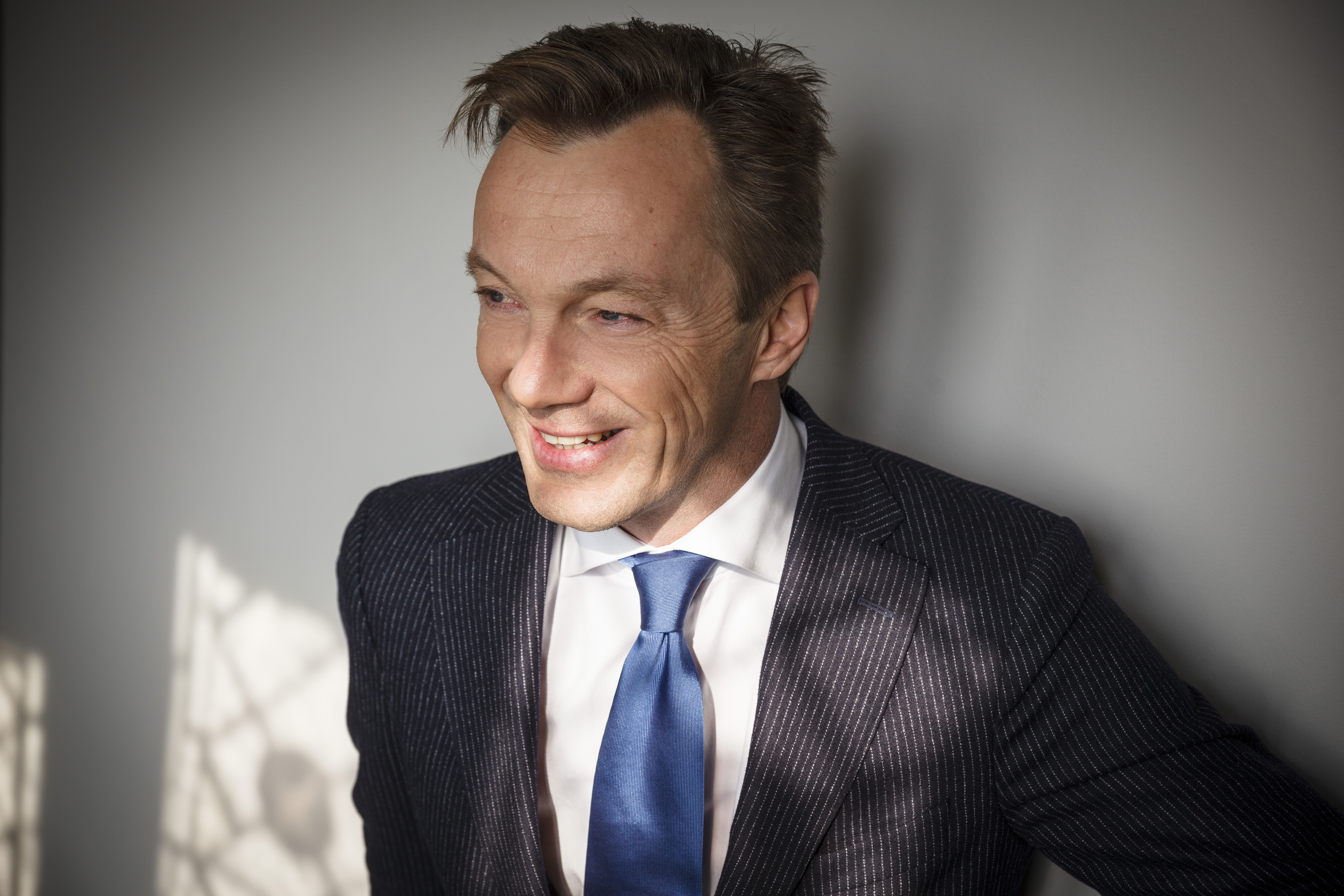
- Pijbes in 2013
- Born: Willem Meint Jans Pijbes; 9 October 1961 (age 64); Veendam, Netherlands

Willem Meint Jans "Wim" Pijbes (born 9 October 1961) is a Dutch art historian and emeritus general director of the Rijksmuseum, Amsterdam.

Pijbes's initiatives at the Rijksmuseum include the museum's complete refurbishment and reopening in April 2013 and the opening of the Philips Wing for photography and temporary exhibitions. In addition he developed and opened RIJKS®, the museum's restaurant. With the reopening of the Rijksmuseum, Pijbes also launched Rijksstudio; the first digital application to offer images of the museum's collection to everyone, free of charge. The Rijksmuseum was the first museum worldwide to ban copyrights and open the collection with a radical approach. The open-content museum dates to 2011, when the Rijksmuseum made the first of 208,000 images available for download at no cost after curators found more than 10,000 low-quality scans of one of its Vermeers online. Pijbes lectures and writes extensively on art, artists, the role of museums in society, copyright and on the digitalization of art.

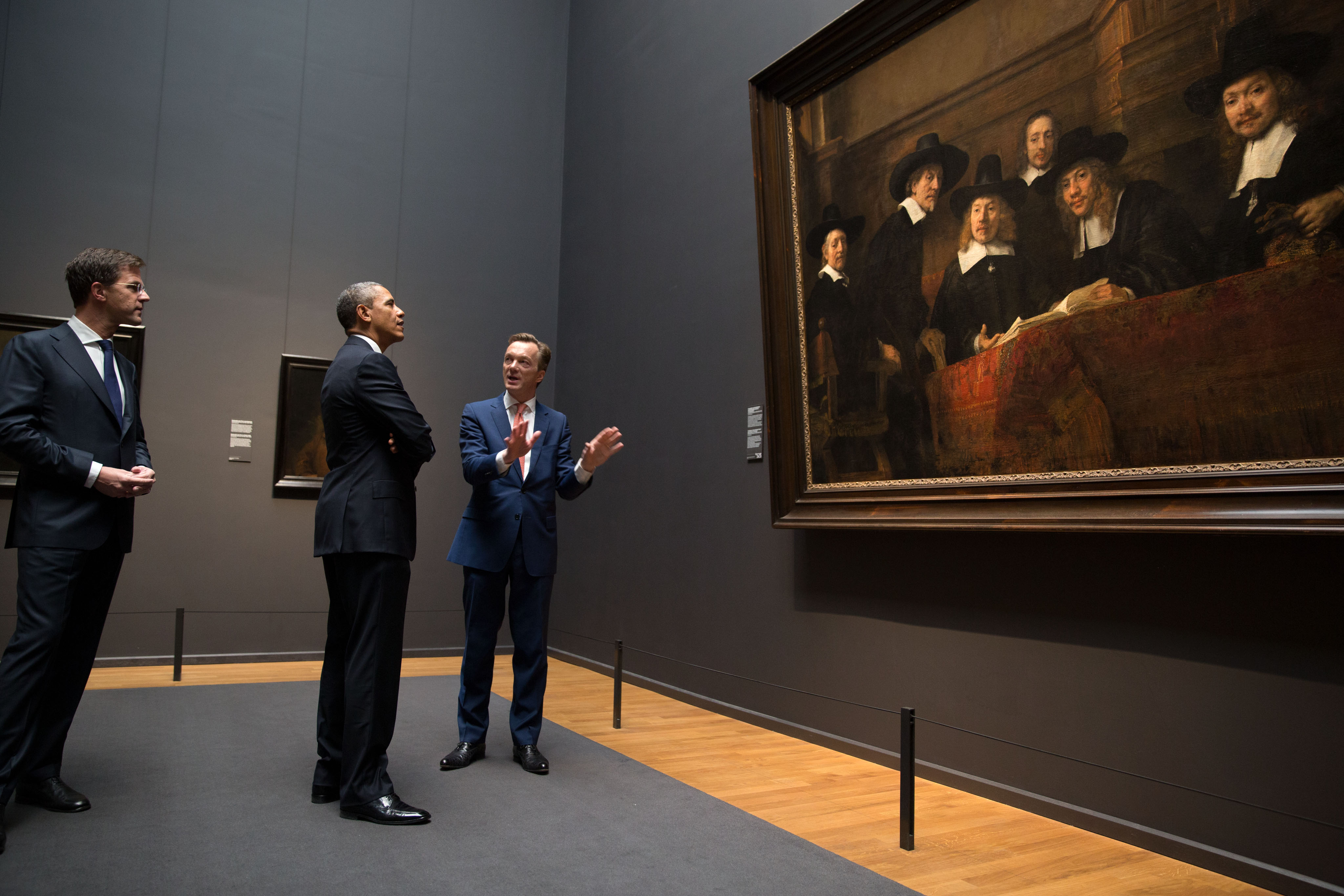
Left to right.: Dutch PM Mark Rutte, American president Barack Obama and Wim Pijbes watching Syndics of the Drapers' Guild by Rembrandt van Rijn in 2014

Pijbes holds a position of the Humanitas Professorship in the History of Art at the University of Cambridge, is Chair of the Supervisory Board of Droog Design, Member of the Supervisory Board of Broadview Holding, board member of the Rembrandt Society and board member of Museum Voorlinden. On 10 November 2016, he was a speaker at the Oxford Union on repatriating artifacts obtained during colonial rule.

On 30 May 2016 it was announced that Pijbes became founding director of Museum Voorlinden, near the Dutch coast. After the opening of Museum Voorlinden he became a member of the board. Taco Dibbits replaced him as General Director at the Rijksmuseum. From January 2017 onwards Pijbes is the managing director of the philanthropic foundation Stichting Droom en Daad (Foundation Dream and Do).
