= Decorative laminate =

Laminated composite material primarily used as a finish for furniture and wall panels

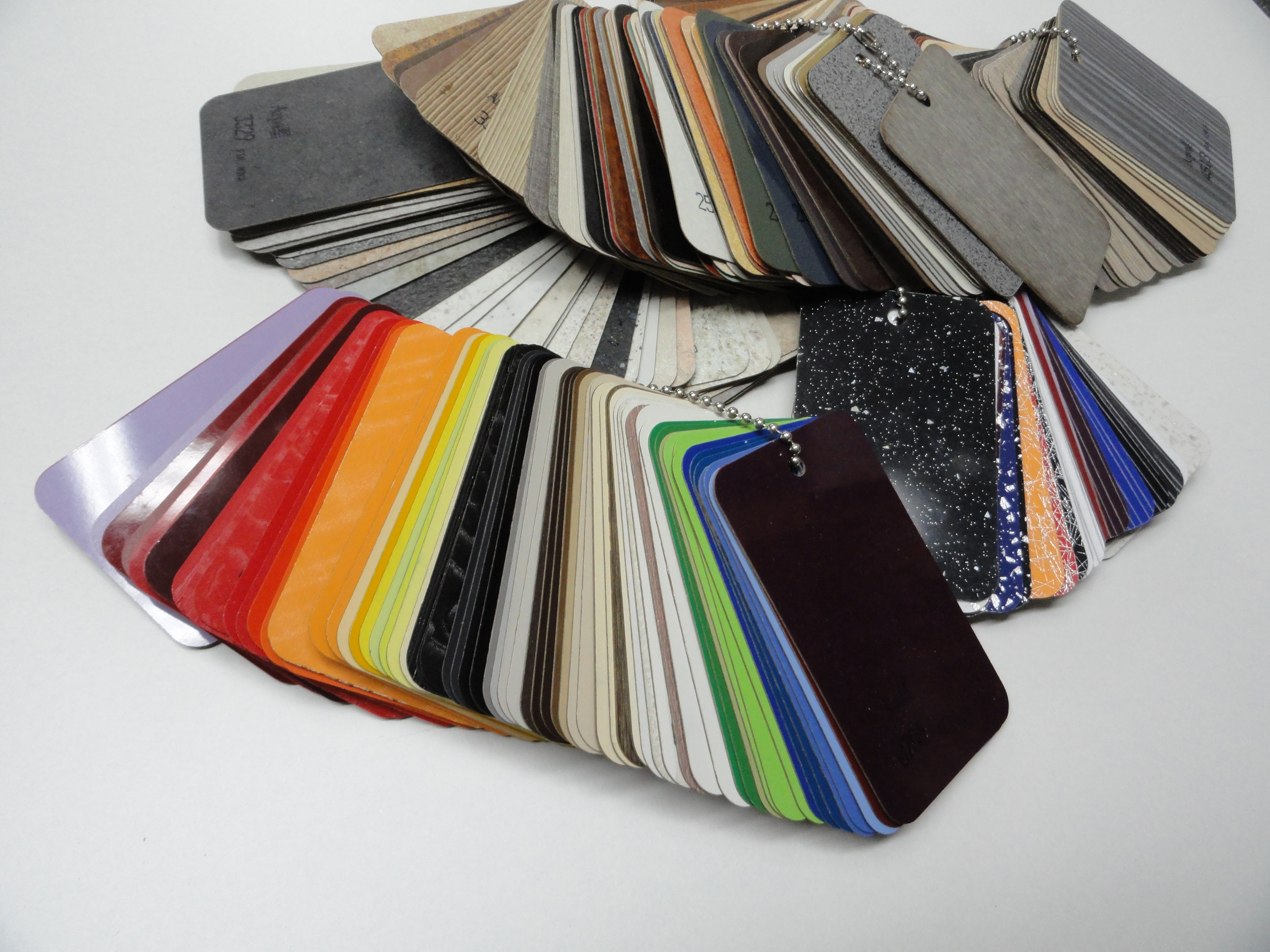
Decorative laminate

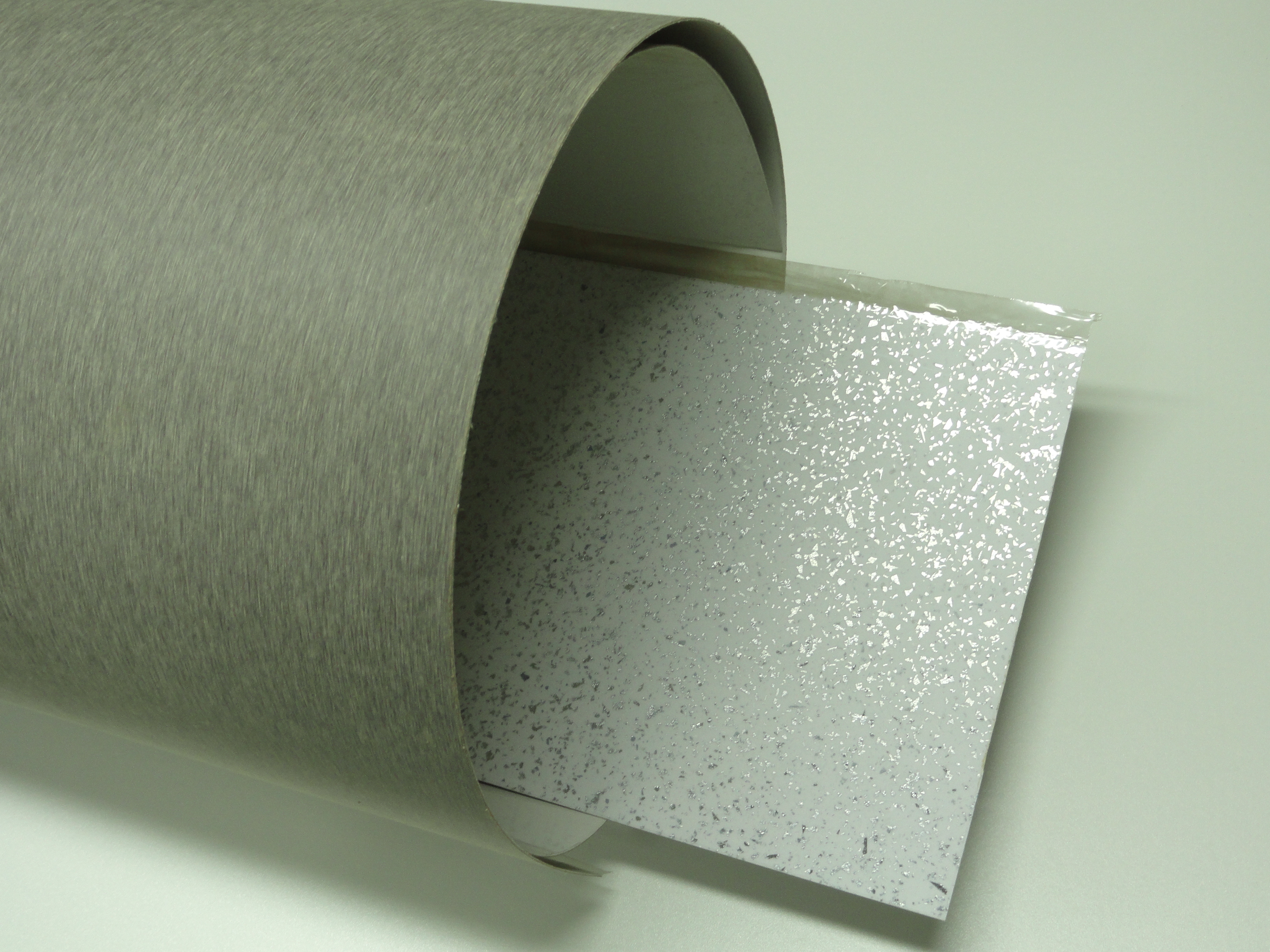
Roll and sheet of decorative laminate

Decorative laminates are laminated products primarily used as furniture surface materials or wall paneling. They can be manufactured as either high- or low-pressure laminate, with the two processes not much different from each other except for the pressure applied in the pressing process. Also, laminate can be produced either in batches or in a continuous process; the latter is called continuous pressure laminate (CPL).

== High-pressure laminate (HPL) ==
According to McGraw-Hill Dictionary of Architecture & Construction, high-pressure laminates consist of laminates "molded and cured at pressures not lower than 1,000 psi (70 kg/cm^{2}) and more commonly in the range of 1,200 to 2,000 psi (80 to 140 kg/cm^{2})."

HPL is made of resin impregnated cellulose layers, which are consolidated under heat and high pressure. The various layers are described below:

- Overlay paper, which serves to improve the abrasion, scratch and heat-resistance
- Decorative paper, which defines the design and is composed of colored or printed paper
- Kraft paper, which is used as core material and to control product thickness.

Trade names include Formica, Arborite, Greenlam, Wilsonart, Resopal, GW-HPL, Micarta and Trespa.

=== Manufacturing ===
After the Kraft papers are impregnated with the resins, the three layers of paper/resin are placed into a press which simultaneously applies heat (120 °C) and pressure (>70 bars). The pressing operation forces the thermoset resins to flow into the paper, then subsequently cure into a consolidated sheet with a density greater than 1.35 g/cm^{3} (84 lb/cu ft). During the press cycle, the decorative surface can also be cured while in contact with a textured surface to create one of many different surface finishes.

HPL consists of more than 60 to 70% Kraft paper, with the remaining 30 to 40% a combination of phenol-formaldehyde resin for the core layers mostly, and melamine-formaldehyde resin for the surface layer. Both resins belong to a class of thermosetting resins which crosslink during the press cycle creating irreversible chemical bonds that produce a nonreactive, stable material with characteristics different and superior to those of the component parts.

HPL can be produced using both continuous and discontinuous (batch) manufacturing processes. HPLs are supplied in sheet form, or compact form, in a variety of sizes, thicknesses and surface finishes.

== Low-pressure laminate ==
Low-pressure laminate is defined as "a plastic laminate molded and cured at pressures in general of 400 pounds per square inch (27 atm; 2.8 MPa)".

== Quality standards ==
There are various industrial standards specifically applied for high-pressure decorative laminates:

=== European Standard EN438 ===
The European Standard EN438 is one of the standards that most decorative laminates manufacturers selling to worldwide market adhere to. The specific code is EN438, entitled: Decorative high-pressure laminates (HPL) sheets based on thermosetting resins, specifications. It replaced all other national European standards.

The specific part of EN438 which applies to high-pressure laminates is Part 3. The full title to this standard is: High-pressure decorative laminates (HPL) Sheets based on thermosetting resins (Usually called laminates) Part 3: Classification and specifications for laminates less than 2 mm thick intended for bonding to supporting substrates. In total there are 9 parts to the EN438.

Decorative laminates are grouped into the following types according to EN 438:

- Type S (standard grade) - The characteristic properties of this grade are hard, virtually wear and scratch proof surfaces, high resistance to impact, insensitivity to boiling water and a number of typical household chemicals, as well as a pronounced resistance to dry and humid heat. The back side of decorative laminate is designed to allow defect free bonding to a substrate such as MDF or chipboard.
- Type P (postforming grade) - The properties of this grade are generally equivalent to type S, but is capable of being postformed at fixed temperature conditions according to the manufacturer's specifications.
- Type F (fire-retardant grade) - The properties of this grade are generally equivalent to type S, but feature increased resistance to fire.

Product specifications applicable to HPL include the nine parts of EN 438 and the two parts of ISO 4586 as shown below:

- EN 438-1: Introduction and general information
- EN 438-2: Determination of properties
- EN 438-3: Classification and specifications for laminates less than 2 mm thick intended for bonding to supporting substrates
- EN 438-4: Classification and specifications for compact laminates of thickness 2 mm and greater
- EN 438-5: Classification and specifications for flooring grade laminates less than 2 mm thick intended for bonding to supporting substrates
- EN 438-6: Classification and specifications for exterior grade compact laminates of thickness 2 mm and greater
- EN 438-7: Compact laminate and HPL composite panels for internal and external wall and ceiling finishes
- EN 438-8: Classification and specifications for design laminates
- EN 438-9 Classification and specifications for alternative core laminates
- ISO 4586-1: High-pressure decorative laminates—Sheets made from thermosetting resins—Part 1: Classification and specifications
- ISO 4586-2: High-pressure decorative laminates—Sheets made from thermosetting resins—Part 2: Determination of properties

=== Antibacterial ===
Antibacterial properties are important for decorative laminates because these laminates are used as kitchen tops and counter tops, cabinets and table tops that may be in constant contact with food materials and younger children. Antibacterial properties are there to ensure that bacterial growth is minimal.

One of the standards for Anti-Bacterial is the ISO 22196:2007, which is based on the Japanese Industrial Standards (JIS), code Z2801. This is one of the standards most often referred to in the industry with regards to tests on microbial activities (specifically bacteria) and in the JIS Z2801, two bacteria species are used as a standard, namely E. Coli and Staphylococcus aureus. However, some companies may have the initiative to test more than just these two bacteria and may also replace Staphylococcus aureus with MRSA, the methicillin-resistant version of the same bacteria.

Again, different countries may choose to specify different types of microbes for testing especially if they identified some bacteria groups which are more intimidating in their countries due to specific reasons.

=== Anti-fungi ===
A common anti-fungi standard is the ASTM G21-09. Not all manufacturers will take the initiatives for product R&D for anti-Fungi attributes. Manufacturers like Maica Laminates send their products for laboratory tests for certification following the ASTM G21-09 standard, while Formica (South America) partners with Microban Protection, which is a company manufacturing additives, including the anti-bacterial additives.

=== Fire-resistant and flame-retardant ===
There are many different standards with regards to fire-resistant and flame-retardant properties of high-pressure decorative laminates. While different countries may have different standards for the building industry to adhere to, most countries may agree on some of the more common standards being used in the industry. Very often, just like other standards applicable to the industry, the tests may be European Standards with their equivalent in the US Standards.

For example, many Commonwealth countries may be comfortable with the British Standards 476 especially Parts 6 and 7, while there will still be US Standard equivalence in the ASTM.

=== Others ===
The list of tests applicable to decorative laminates will never be exhaustive. As the technology improves, there will be many more tests to ensure the safety of the products upon use by the end consumer, for example perhaps the tests on transfer of surface substance to food materials if prepared on the decorative laminates as a kitchen surface. The core tests will then also branch out based on the specific requirements and standards adopted by different countries.

=== "Green" certificates ===
Two of the internationally acknowledged "Green" certificates for decorative laminates are MAS Certified Green and GREENGUARD. The MAS Certified Green and GREENGUARD marks are to certify that the products have low chemical emissions. Chemicals tested include VOCs, formaldehyde and other harmful particles. The tests are based on single occupancy room with outdoor ventilation following the ANSI/ASHRAE Standard 62.1-2007, Ventilation for Acceptable Indoor Air Quality. GREENGUARD especially, has two main consideration, GREENGUARD and GREENGUARD GOLD. The GREENGUARD n GOLD was previously known as the GREENGUARD Children and Schools Certified, signifying its relevance of very low allowable chemical emissions levels to ensure the safety of young children and school environment.

There are also many other "Green" certifications, some which are requirements by the authorities before the product can be used as building materials. These include the Singapore Green Label which is recognised by the Global Ecolabelling Network (GEN) and all its member countries.

== Applications ==
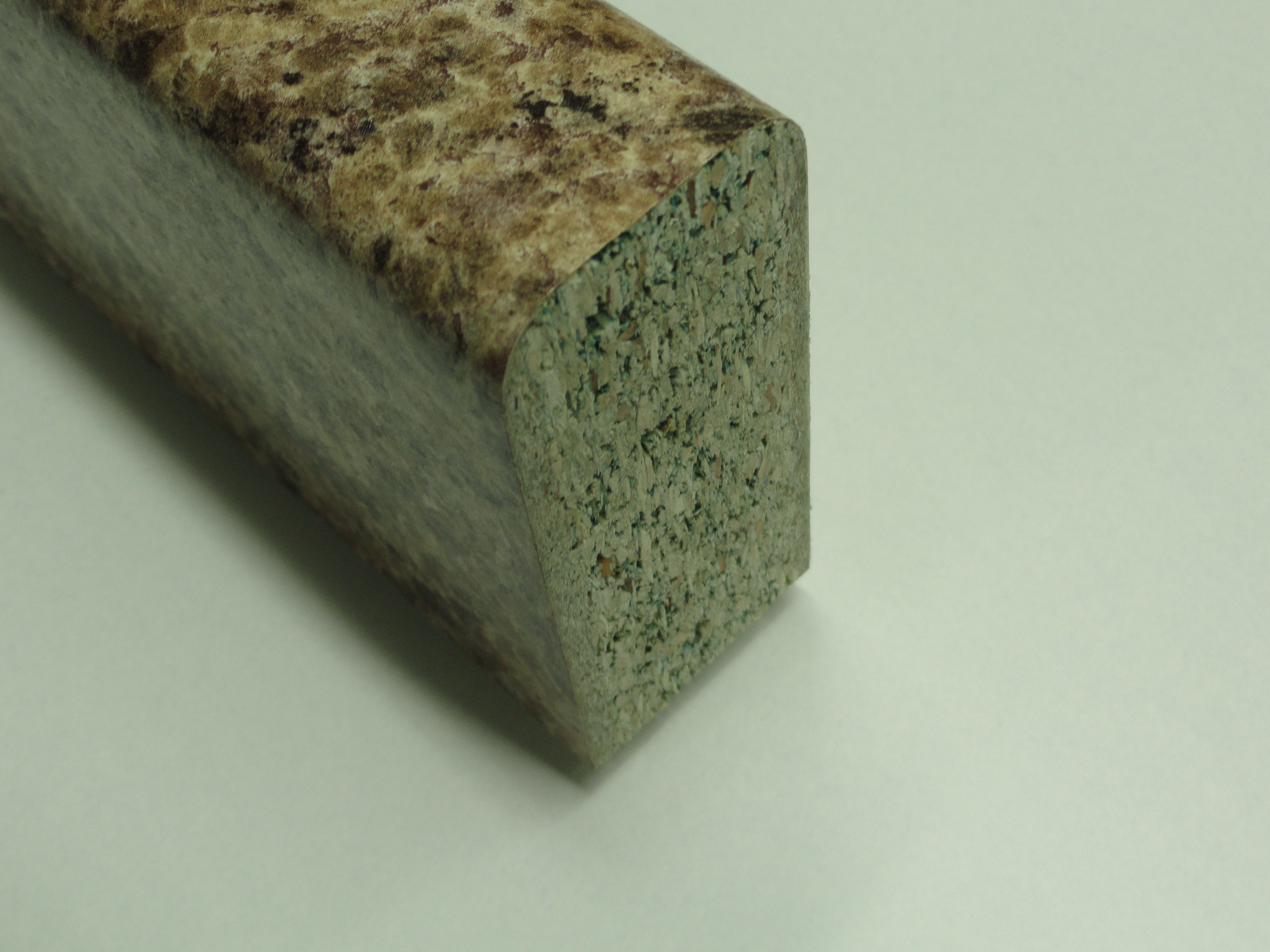
Piece of kitchen countertop covered with decorative laminate

Decorative high-pressure laminates are usually used for furniture tops especially on flat surfaces, including cabinets and tables. Decorative compact laminates are sometimes constructed as toilet cubicle systems, laboratory tables and kitchen tops. Some new usage models include wall panels with conceptual designs and custom prints.

== Competition ==
The popularity of large format printing using inkjet printers has produced a cheaper alternative to decorative laminates, minus the quality. For most uninformed consumers, the large format printing are similar to laminates, and seem to offer more variety of designs and applications. For example, large format prints can be printed on wall stickers, and then installed on walls. Unlike decorative laminates, there is no special adhesive to be used, and the price may sometimes seem much cheaper comparatively.

However, there are health considerations for large format prints because of the solvent inks used, especially with their relatively high concentrations of VOCs. These health considerations may be alleviated with newer wide format technology that uses Eco-Solvent or Latex inks.
