= Formica (plastic) =

Composite material of paper with melamine resin

- Type: Composite material
- Inventor: Daniel J. O'Conor, Herbert A. Faber
- Inception: 1913; 113 years ago
- Manufacturer: Formica Group
- Website: www.formica.com

Formica Laminate is a composite material invented at the Westinghouse Electric Corporation in the United States in 1912. Originally used to replace mica in electrical applications, it has since been manufactured for multiple applications. It has been produced by Formica Group manufacturing sites across the globe since. Formica Group are best known for the company's classic product: a heat-resistant, wipe-clean laminate of paper with melamine resin.

The mineral mica was commonly used at that time for electrical insulation. Because the new product acted as a substitute "for mica", the inventors used the name Formica as a trademark. The word already existed as the scientific name for a genus of wood ants, from which formic acid and the derivative formaldehyde compound used in the resin were first isolated.

== Founding and initial product development ==
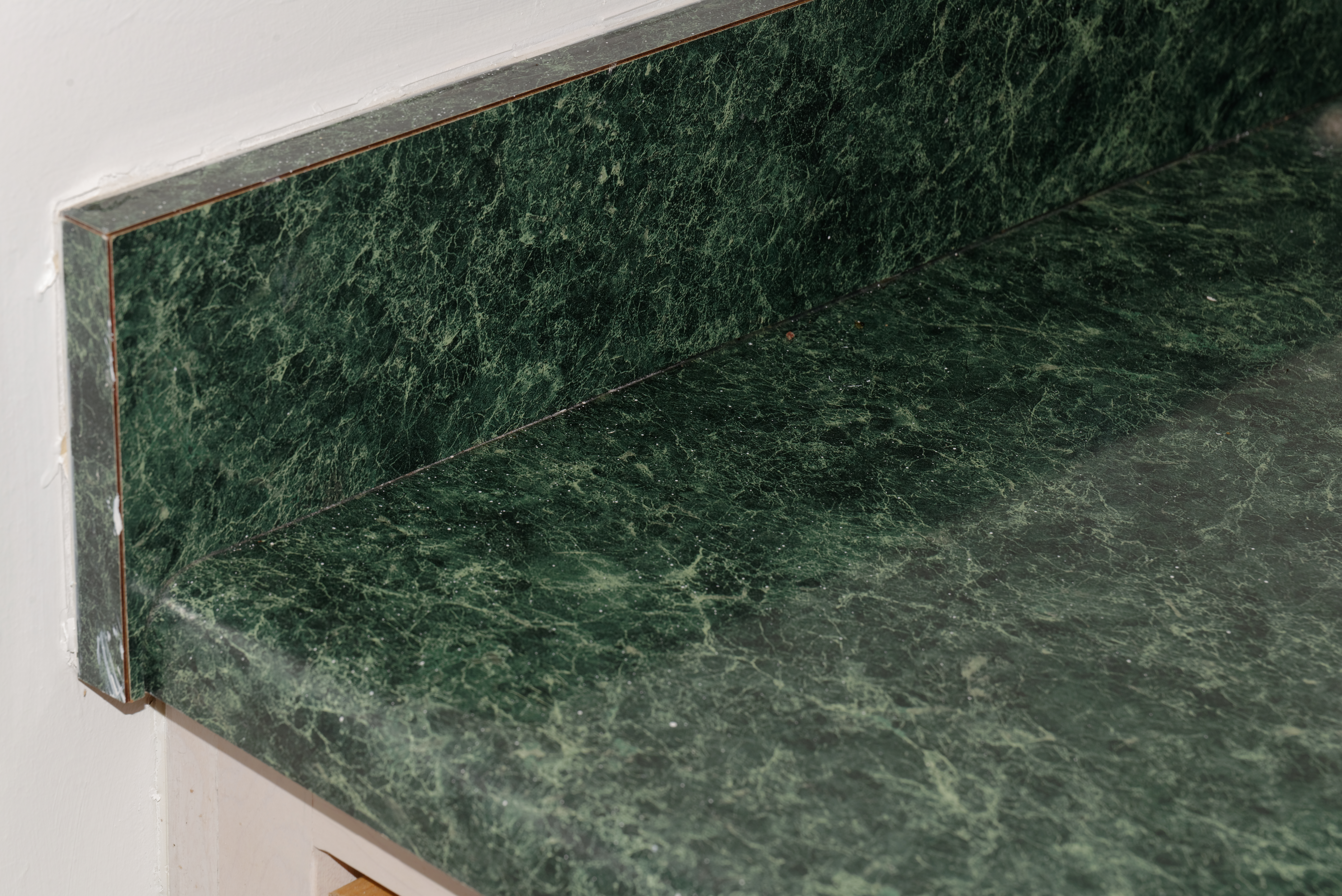
Formica kitchen countertop

Formica laminate was invented in 1912 by Daniel J. O'Conor and Herbert A. Faber, while they were working at Westinghouse, resulting in a patent filing on 1 February 1913. U.S. Patent No. 1,284,432 was granted on 12 November 1918. O'Conor and Faber originally conceived it as a substitute for mica used as electrical insulation, made of wrapped woven fabric coated with Bakelite thermosetting resin, then slit lengthwise, flattened, and cured in a press.

Immediately afterwards, O'Conor and Faber left Westinghouse to establish a business based on the product, enlisting lawyer and banker John G. Tomlin as an investor. Tomlin provided $7,500 capital as a silent business partner. The company began operations on 2 May 1913, and was immediately successful: by September, Formica Products Company employed eighteen people trying to fill the demand for electrical parts for Bell Electric Motor, Ideal Electric, and Northwest Electric.

After the General Bakelite Company (founded in 1910 by inventor Leo Baekeland) decided to sell resin for sheet insulation only to Westinghouse, allowing the Formica company other shapes with smaller markets, they switched to a similar competitive phenolic resin, Redmanol. After patent litigation favorable to Baekeland in 1922, the Redmanol Chemical Products Company was merged with the General Bakelite Company and the Condensite Company (founded by J. W. Aylesworth) to form The Bakelite Corporation.

An important application devised in the 1920s was the use of phenolic laminate fabric for gears; cut on conventional hobbing machines, the gears were tough and quiet, which was important for automotive timing gears. By 1932, the Formica Insulation Company was producing 6,000 gear blanks per day for Chevrolet and other car makers.

In 1927, Formica Insulation Company obtained a patent on an opaque barrier sheet that allowed the use of rotogravure printing to make wood-grained or marble-surfaced laminate, the first of many innovations that were to associate the name "Formica" with decorative interior products.

In 1938, melamine thermosetting resin was developed by American Cyanamid Company. It resisted heat, abrasion and moisture better than phenolic or urea resins and could be used to make more colors; soon after, the Formica Corporation was buying the entire output of melamine from American Cyanamid.

During World War II, it manufactured "Pregwood" plastic-impregnated wooden aeroplane propellers and bomb parts. Post-war, engineering uses declined, ceasing in 1970 in favor of decorative laminates.

The company was headquartered in Cincinnati, Ohio, for many years. After WWII, it entered the European market through a license agreement.

== Acquisition by American Cyanamid ==
In 1956, American Cyanamid acquired Formica Corporation. The principal reason was to have a captive buyer for melamine, as Cyanamid was one of the largest producers. However, this was soon thwarted due to an anti-trust action by the US Department of Justice. Through a settlement agreement in 1964, American Cyanamid was required to sell its melamine plant at Willow Island, West Virginia.

Cyanamid operated Formica Corporation as a fully consolidated subsidiary, rather than as an operating division, allowing it to retain the term "Formica" as a corporate name. This gave added protection to the trademark, helping to protect the word from becoming generic—which had been tried by many competitors, against whom Cyanamid gained legal injunctions—to protect this valuable trademark name. Historically, trademarks owned by other corporations which had become generic words, such as "shredded wheat", were no longer the exclusive property of their originators. Cyanamid resolutely defended the Formica brand name.

Dan O'Conor, son of the inventor, remained as president of Formica Corporation after the acquisition. He was named vice president of Cyanamid in 1960 and executive vice president four years later. In 1967, O'Conor was paralyzed in an automobile accident and resigned from the company. He died in 1974 at the age of 57.

In October 1984, American Cyanamid sold its Formica brand in a management buyout that also included executives from Shearson/American Express. After the sale, Formica group diversified with products such as solid surfacing and metal laminates.

== 21st century ==
In 2007, Fletcher Building group purchased Formica Corp. from private equity investors Cerberus Capital Management, L.P. and Oaktree Capital Management, LLC for $700 million. In 2018, Fletcher Building announced plans to sell Formica to Broadview Holdings (parent of Trespa) for NZD $1.226 billion (US$840 m); the sale was finalised the following year.

== See also ==
- Micarta – Brand name for a fabric-plastic composite
- Wilsonart – Manufacturer of composite materials
- Consoweld
