= Anne Vondeling prize =

Dutch award given to journalists

The Anne Vondeling prize (Anne Vondelingprijs), named after the politician Anne Vondeling a member of the Dutch Labour Party, is an annual award in The Netherlands given to journalists who write in a clear manner concerning political subjects.

== Recipients ==
- 1980 – Harry van Wijnen (Het Parool)
- 1981 – Dieudonné ten Berge (Elsevier)
- 1982 – José Toirkens (NRC Handelsblad)
- 1983 – Joop van Tijn and Max van Weezel (Vrij Nederland)
- 1984 – Max de Bok (De Gelderlander)
- 1985 – Yvonne Zonderop (Het Vrije Volk)
- 1986 – Constant Vecht (De Groene Amsterdammer, De Waarheid)
- 1987 – Hubert Smeets (NRC Handelsblad)
- 1988 – Willem Breedveld (Trouw)
- 1989 – Laura Starink (NRC Handelsblad)
- 1990 – Ulko Jonker (Het Financieele Dagblad)
- 1991 – Rob Meines (NRC Handelsblad)
- 1992 – Kees Lunshof (Telegraaf)
- 1993 – Oscar Garschagen (de Volkskrant)
- 1994 – Leonard Ornstein and Max van Weezel (Vrij Nederland)
- 1995 – Mark Kranenburg (NRC Handelsblad)
- 1996 – not awarded
- 1997 – Jet Bruinsma (de Volkskrant)
- 1998 – Pieter Klein and Stephan Koole (Algemeen Dagblad)
- 1999 – Wierd Duk (Elsevier)
- 2000 – Cisca Dresselhuys (Opzij)
- 2001 – Hans Goslinga (Trouw)
- 2002 – Lidy Nicolasen (de Volkskrant)
- 2002 – Michiel Zonneveld (Vrij Nederland)
- 2003 – Marcel ten Hooven (Trouw)
- 2004 – Marc Chavannes (NRC Handelsblad)
- 2005 – Hans Wansink (de Volkskrant)
- 2006 – Jérôme Heldring (NRC Handelsblad)
- 2007 – Elsbeth Etty (NRC Handelsblad)
- 2008 – Kees van der Malen (Noordhollands Dagblad, Haarlems Dagblad, Leidsch Dagblad en Gooi- en Eemlander)
- 2009 – Joost Oranje (NRC Handelsblad)
- 2010 – Martin Sommer (de Volkskrant)
- 2011 – Ferry Mingelen (NOS)
- 2012 – Caroline de Gruyter (NRC Handelsblad)
- 2013 – not awarded
- 2014 – Tom-Jan Meeus (NRC Handelsblad)
- 2015 – Aukje van Roessel (De Groene Amsterdammer)
- 2016 – Marc Peeperkorn (de Volkskrant)
- 2017 – Kim van Keken and Eric Smit (Follow the Money)
- 2018 - Milena Holdert and Ghassan Dahhan (Nieuwsuur and Trouw)
- 2019 - Petra de Koning (NRC Handelsblad)
- 2020 - Marc Chavannes (De Correspondent)
