= College Tour =

Dutch television talk show

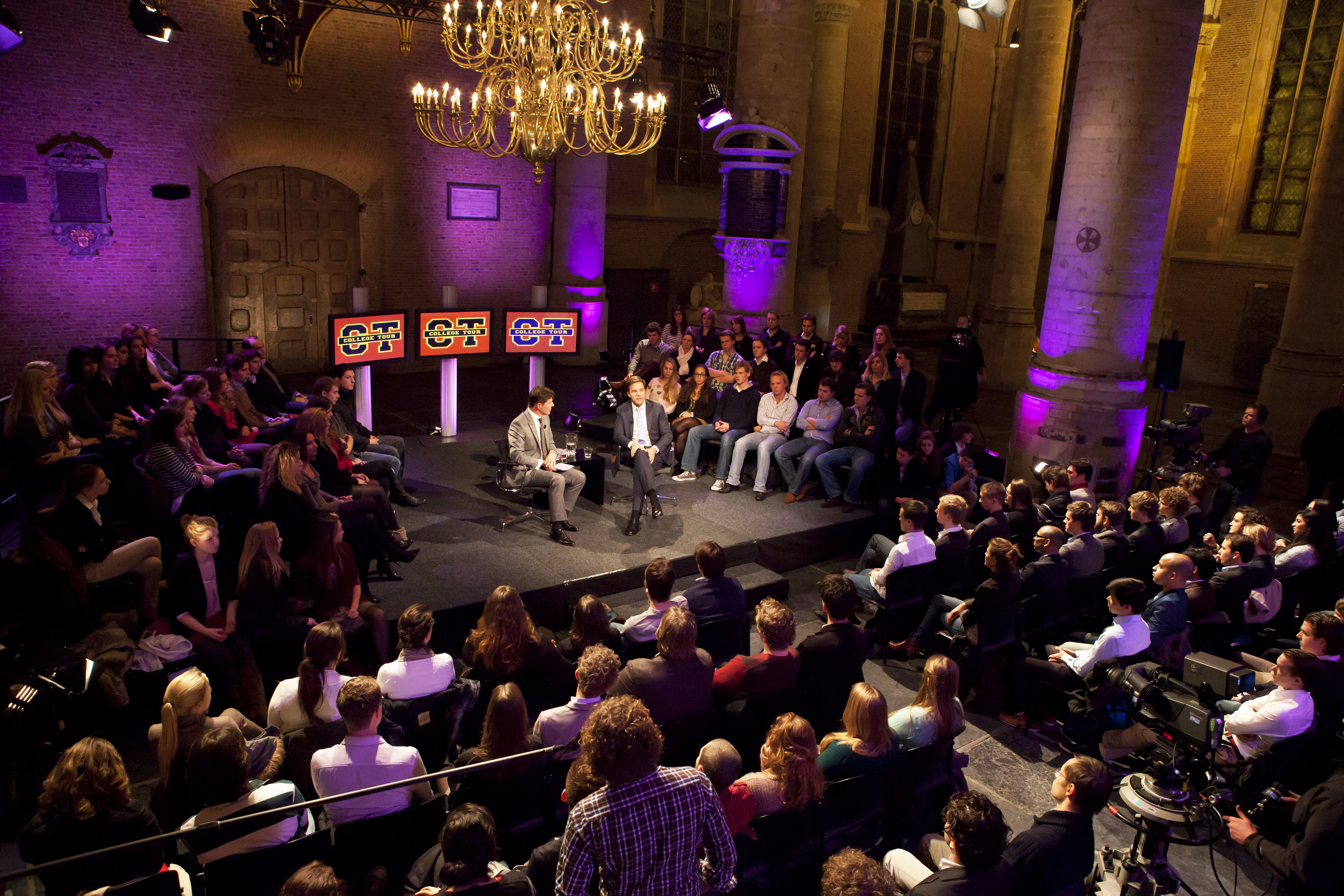
- Dutch prime minister Mark Rutte on the show in late 2011.
- Created by: Twan Huys
- Based on: Town hall meetings
- Starring: Twan Huys
- Country of origin: Netherlands
- Original languages: Dutch or English, depending on the guest
- No. of seasons: 9
- No. of episodes: 100

Production
- Production location: Varying
- Running time: Ca. 50 minutes
- Production company: NTR broadcasting

Original release
- Network: Netherlands Public Broadcasting system, channel NPO 3
- Release: December 4, 2007 – 2017

College Tour is a TV-show in the Netherlands, that interviews the most high-profile Dutch and international guests. Inspired by town hall meetings during United States elections, the majority of questions are asked by the audience. The show is hosted by news anchor Twan Huys, who conceived its format while working as U.S. correspondent in New York and Washington D.C. from 1999–2007.

Similar to Inside the Actors Studio, College Tour typically features one guest per episode, and an audience of a few hundred students — however guests can be from all walks of life, including politicians, entrepreneurs, musicians and lawyers. Foreign guests have included Bill Gates, Shimon Peres, Sting and the Dalai Lama. Dutch interviews have featured football legend Johan Cruijff, astronaut André Kuipers and formerly Dutch activist Ayaan Hirsi Ali.

Although College Tour aims to be weekly, episodes are only produced as sufficiently interesting guests can be found available. It is claimed that audience questions are not pre-screened, and there is no censorship on language used. Interviews with international celebrities are done completely in English, including the questions posed by the audience. Broadcasts feature the original sound with Dutch subtitles — there is no audio dubbing. Commercial breaks are absent.
Recording takes place in varying venues — frequently (movie) theatres, conference rooms, or sometimes a church. Occasionally the show is taken abroad to meet up with stars who are willing, but unable to visit the Netherlands. In a few cases, special venues were arranged, for instance when Da Vinci Code writer Dan Brown was interviewed in the Amsterdam Rijksmuseum, in front of famous painting The Night Watch.

== Episodes ==
First airdate	Guest	Images
2007
4 December 2007	Hans Teeuwen	Hans Teeuwen
13 December 2007	Jan Jaap van der Wal	Hans Teeuwen
2008
10 January 2008	Joop van den Ende	Neelie Kroes
17 January 2008	Neelie Kroes	Neelie Kroes
24 January 2008	Gerard Spong	Madeleine Albright
21 February 2008	Madeleine Albright	Madeleine Albright
5 June 2008	Johan Cruijff	Johan Cruijff
13 November 2008	Nick Leeson	Johan Cruijff
2009
24 January 2009	John Malkovich	John Malkovich
25 March 2009	Peter van Uhm	John Malkovich
1 April 2009	Jesse Jackson	Jesse Jackson
22 April 2009	Rem Koolhaas	Jesse Jackson
13 May 2009	Wouter Bos	Dalai Lama
3 June 2009	Dalai Lama	Dalai Lama
10 June 2009	Princess Irene of the Netherlands	Steve Ballmer
11 October 2009	Steve Ballmer	Steve Ballmer
2010
15 February 2010	Harry Mulisch	Ayaan Hirsi Ali
23 March 2010	Ayaan Hirsi Ali	Ayaan Hirsi Ali
1 June 2010	Jan Peter Balkenende	Jan Peter Balkenende
7 June 2010	Dries van Agt and Hans Wiegel	Jan Peter Balkenende
9 September 2010	Doutzen Kroes	Doutzen Kroes
11 November 2010	Louis van Gaal	Doutzen Kroes
2011
11 February 2011	Bram Moszkowicz	
14 February 2011	Maxime Verhagen	
24 March 2011	Alain Ducasse	Alain Ducasse
31 March 2011	Linda de Mol	Alain Ducasse
8 September 2011	Youp van 't Hek	Seth Meyers
15 September 2011	Seth Meyers	Seth Meyers
19 November 2011	Richard Branson	Richard Branson
19 December 2011	Mark Rutte	Richard Branson
2012
17 February 2012	Matthijs van Nieuwkerk	John de Mol
24 February 2012	Rijkman Groenink	John de Mol
2 March 2012	John de Mol	Sting
9 March 2012	Sting	Sting
1 June 2012	Eric Schmidt	Eric Schmidt
30 August 2012	André Kuipers	Eric Schmidt
14 September 2012	Wim Anker	Desmond Tutu
21 September 2012	Desmond Tutu	Desmond Tutu
28 September 2012	Janine Jansen	Desmond Tutu
5 October 2012	David Sedaris	David Sedaris
12 October 2012	Willem Holleeder	David Sedaris
19 October 2012	Sonja Barend	Susan Sarandon
2 November 2012	Susan Sarandon	Susan Sarandon
2013
2 February 2013	Bernardo Bertolucci	Richard Gere
17 February 2013	Richard Gere	Richard Gere
1 March 2013	Guus Hiddink	Whoopi Goldberg
8 March 2013	Whoopi Goldberg	Whoopi Goldberg
15 March 2013	Eddie Izzard	Eddie Izzard
29 March 2013	Diederik Samsom	Eddie Izzard
5 April 2013	Carice van Houten	Nigella Lawson
12 April 2013	Nigella Lawson	Nigella Lawson
24 May 2013	A.F.Th. van der Heijden	Frank de Boer
6 September 2013	Frank de Boer	Frank de Boer
13 September 2013	Armin van Buuren	
20 September 2013	Frans de Waal	
27 September 2013	Karin Slaughter	Shimon Peres
4 October 2013	Shimon Peres	Shimon Peres
11 October 2013	Epke Zonderland	Robbie Williams
18 October 2013	Robbie Williams	Robbie Williams
25 October 2013	Ruby Wax	Malala Yousafzai
1 November 2013	Malala Yousafzai	Malala Yousafzai
2014
7 February 2014	Dan Brown	Dan Brown
14 February 2014	Michaela DePrince	Dan Brown
21 February 2014	Erwin Olaf	Erwin Olaf
7 March 2014	Derk Sauer	Erwin Olaf
14 March 2014	Frans Timmermans	John Legend
21 March 2014	Klaas Knot	John Legend
28 March 2014	John Legend	John Legend
4 April 2014	Jaap van Zweden	Arjen Robben
29 August 2014	Arjen Robben	Arjen Robben
5 September 2014	Marlene Dumas	Jeremy Paxman
12 September 2014	Jeremy Paxman	Jeremy Paxman
19 September 2014	Jerry Springer	Famke Janssen
26 September 2014	Famke Janssen	Famke Janssen
3 October 2014	Afrojack	Afrojack
17 October 2014	Gerrit Zalm	Afrojack
24 October 2014	Stromae	Stromae
31 October 2014	Johnny de Mol	Stromae
6 November 2014	Thomas Piketty	Anouk (singer)
7 November 2014	Anouk	Anouk (singer)
14 November 2014	Bill Gates	Bill Gates
25 December 2014	John Cleese	Bill Gates
2015
20 February 2015	Ronald Koeman	Ronald Koeman
27 February 2015	Arnon Grunberg	Ronald Koeman
6 March 2015	Herman Finkers	Remco Campert
8 March 2015	Remco Campert	Remco Campert
13 March 2015	Lodewijk Asscher	Remco Campert
20 March 2015	Chantal Janzen	Louis Theroux
27 March 2015	Louis Theroux	Louis Theroux
4 September 2015	Halina Reijn	Halina Reijn
11 September 2015	Jeroen Dijsselbloem	Halina Reijn
18 September 2015	Guus Meeuwis	Anton Corbijn
25 September 2015	Anton Corbijn	Anton Corbijn
9 October 2015	Denis Mukwege	Denis Mukwege
16 October 2015	Rod Stewart	Denis Mukwege
30 December 2015	Herman Finkers	
2016
5 February 2016	Jane Goodall	
12 February 2016	Herman van Veen	
19 February 2016	Daan Roosegaarde	
26 February 2016	Floortje Dessing	
4 March 2016	Ahmed Aboutaleb	
15 April 2016	Carl Bernstein	
16 September 2016	Jochem Myjer	
23 September 2016	Ai Weiwei	
30 September 2016	Reed Hastings	
7 October 2016	Igone de Jongh	
14 October 2016	Geert Mak	
21 October 2016	Khadija Arib	
2017
7 April 2017	Ed Sheeran	
21 April 2017	Christiane Amanpour	
28 April 2017	Ben Feringa	
5 May 2017	Ellen Laan	
12 May 2017	Arjen Lubach	
19 May 2017	Ali B	
10 November 2017	Frans Lanting	
