= Ferry Mingelen =

Dutch journalist, broadcaster and presenter

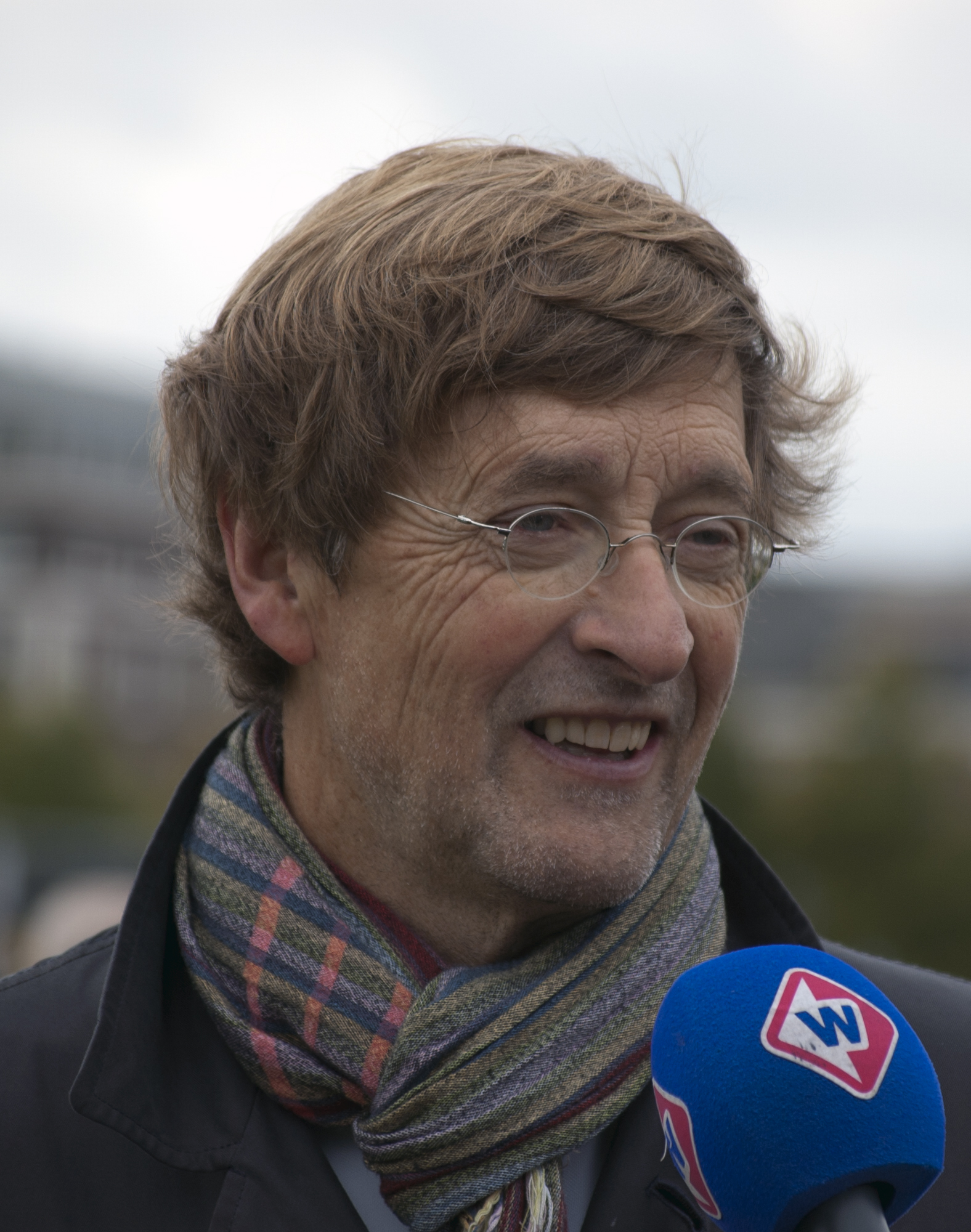
- Ferry Mingelen giving an interview during protests against announced cuts on the Dutch public broadcasting system.
- Born: Ferdinand Charles Mingelen; 12 December 1947 (age 78); The Hague, Netherlands
- Occupation: Journalist
- Television: Den Haag Vandaag; Nova; Nieuwsuur

Ferdinand Charles (Ferry) Mingelen (born 12 December 1947 in The Hague) is a Dutch parliamentary journalist.

Before his television career he was a reporter for Het Vrije Volk, Trouw and the GPD newspapers.

In 1984, he became presenter of the Den Haag Vandaag (The Hague Today) political news show for the NOS (Dutch public television), which later became a part of the news show Nova. In September 2010, he started working for Nieuwsuur, the successor of Nova (the name Den Haag Vandaag did not return in this programme). Mingelen was also the presenter of the coverage of Dutch elections for the NOS.

In 2012, Mingelen received the 2011 Anne Vondeling prize.

Mingelen had his last report for the NOS on 4 December 2013, where he appeared on Nieuwsuur. Two days later, he announced he would become the political analyst for the Pauw & Witteman talkshow. This show ended in May 2014.
