= Clairy Polak =

Dutch journalist (1956–2023)

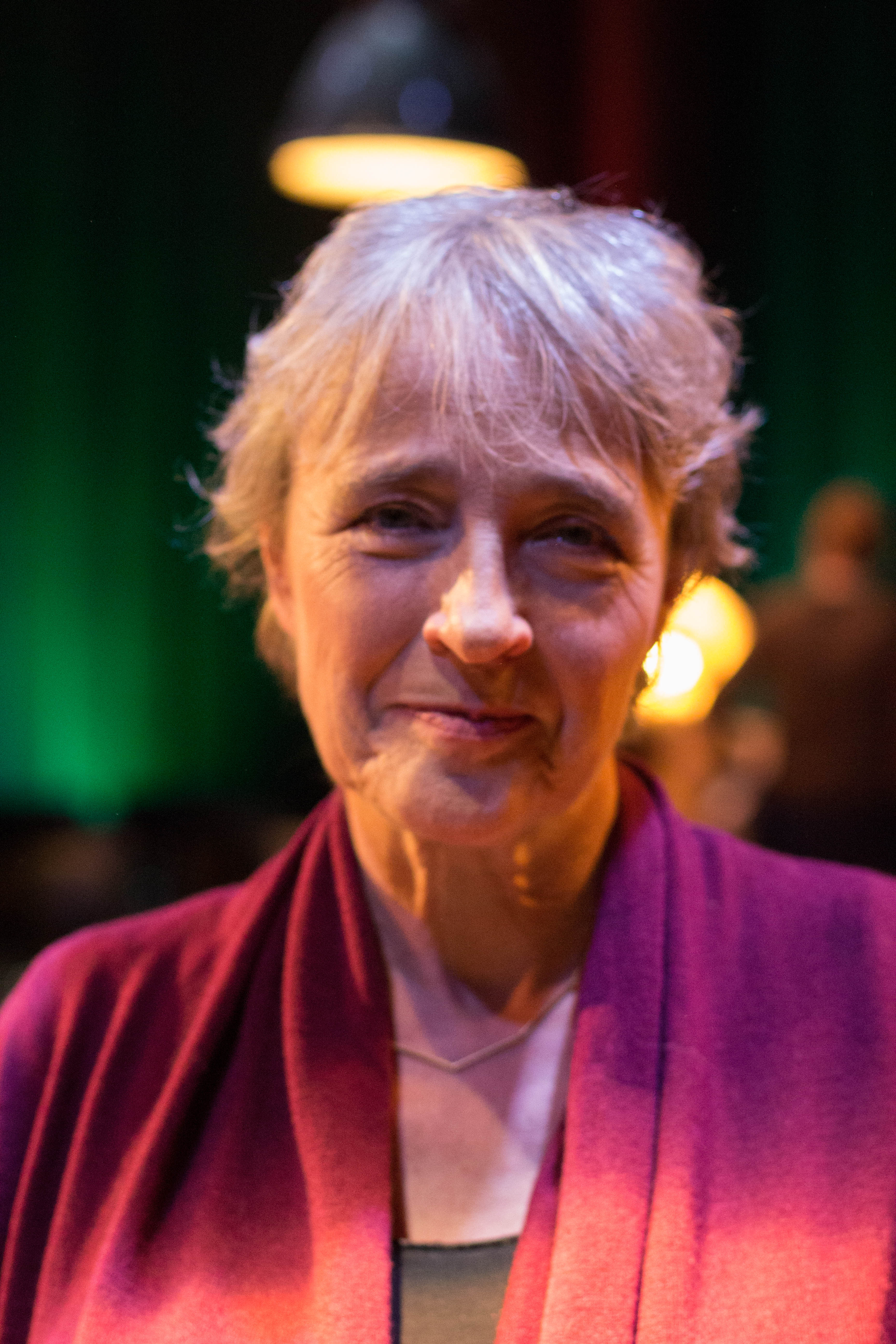
- Polak in 2014
- Born: 30 May 1956; Amsterdam, Netherlands
- Died: 31 August 2023 (aged 67); Amsterdam, Netherlands

Clairy Ruth Polak (30 May 1956 – 31 August 2023) was a Dutch journalist and radio and television presenter.

== Early life ==
Born and raised in Amsterdam, Polak was the only child of the comedians Katja Berndsen and Alexander Pola, the stage name of Abraham Polak. Her father was Jewish, but Polak herself was raised non-Jewish.

== Career ==
After high school, Polak started her media career at Uitkrant. In 1988, she started working as a desk editor at the Dutch broadcaster VARA. Two years later she became a political reporter for the radio there. Later she became, among other things, presenter of the radio programme De Editie. In 1995, she switched to Radio 1 Journaal, where she started working on 1 September. In 1998 she was named the best radio producer of that year. In 2002, Polak returned to VARA, where she became the presenter of the radio programmes De Ochtenden and Ophef en Vertier.

When she was asked by VARA chairman Vera Keur to present the current affairs program NOVA, Polak stopped presenting Ophef en Vertier.

From 27 January 2003 to 2 September 2010 she was a presenter on NOVA. NOVA was her debut on television as a presenter. In 2010 she received the Sonja Barend Award for her interview with Hans van Goor on NOVA in 2009. On 12 November 2005, she was a guest on Dit was het nieuws with René Mioch.

In 2009, there was a need for a new current affairs program to replace NOVA. It was given the name Nieuwsuur. Polak would still become an interviewer for this program. She remained in this position until October 2010.

Polak received awards such as Best Radio Maker 1998, the Sonja Barend Award 2010 and the Silver Travel Microphone in 2014.

== Death ==
Polak died in Amsterdam on 31 August 2023, at the age of 67.

== Views ==
Polak said in several interviews that radio was her preference. According to Polak, radio was more about the content and the medium was faster. On the radio, Polak was often seen as a "shark bay" because of her fierce interviewing style. Around 2008–2009 she was seen as the face of left-wing journalism, which was part of the general accusation that current affairs programs were too politically left-oriented. Polak said of herself in an interview in Elsevier Weekblad: "The idea prevails that being critical is the same as being left-wing. I know that I am a critical journalist and I want to be one. But I do not want to be dismissed as a left-wing journalist. Anyway, the discussion is now decided in my favour."

== Publications ==
Including:

- 1986 met Marijke Hoving en Sieto Hoving: Het is nooit beloofd dat het leuk zou word
- en, Kampen: La Rivière & Voorhoeve, [1986]
- 1987 met Kors van Bennekom en Coen Whi: Uitmarkt: de opening van het culturele seizoen, Amsterdam: AUB Amsterdams Uit Buro, 1987.
- 1997 met Bo van der Meulen: [Jan Kal], geen plaats: VARA, 1997. Reeks Ophef en vertier, 8 December 1997. Audioboek. Gesprek met dichter Jan Kal over zijn bundel '1000 sonnetten' (1997).
- 2005: 26000 gezichten, het debat, [geen plaats], 2005. Video over uitgeprocedeerde asielzoekers.
- 2010: Europa: situatie in Ierland, Hilversum: NPS/VARA/VPRO, 2010. DVD-video, Buitenhof, 28 November 2010
- 2012 met Ad Verbrugge en Marc Joosten: De ziel van de verzorgingsstaat, Hilversum: Human, 2012. Reeks: Het filosofisch kwintet, video
- 2019: Voorbij, voorbij, roman, Amsterdam: Meulenhoff, [2019]
