= Revolutionary Socialist Party (Netherlands, 2022) =

Revolutionary Socialist Party Revolutionair Socialistische Partij
- Abbreviation: RSP
- Chairperson: Ties van den Boogard
- Founded: 2022
- Split from: Socialist Party
- Headquarters: Gaffelstraat 61B, 3014RC Rotterdam
- Newspaper: Paraat!
- Youth wing: ROOD
- Ideology: Revolutionary socialism Communism; Marxism; Radical democracy Progressivism
- Political position: Far-left

Website
- rsp.nu

The Revolutionary Socialist Party (Dutch: Revolutionair Socialistische Partij; RSP), known as The Socialists (Dutch: De Socialisten) until 2025, is a Dutch revolutionary socialist political party. The party was founded in 2022 by expelled members from the Socialist Party (SP), who previously encompassed its radical wing.

== History ==
The creation of the RSP is the result of an internal ideological conflict within the SP. This conflict took place between the party leadership and the left wing of the party, formed by, among others, ROOD (the former youth organization of the SP), Communist Platform (CP) and the Marxist Forum. This conflict started over the incompatibility of the victory of the CP with the victory of the SP. From October 2020, members of CP were expelled. Subsequently, in November 2020, ties with the youth organization ROOD were suspended, because the chairman and the board member had met with CP. In October 2021, ROOD and the Marxist Forum were labelled as 'political parties' by the party board, which prohibited dual membership. This amounted to the expulsion of several dozen members.

The subsequent suspensions of the local boards of the Utrecht and Rotterdam branches prompted a number of members to issue a statement. It is stated, among other things, that the party "(…) suffers from a serious democratic deficit and a toxic leadership culture," and that "the party leadership (…) has launched an attack against socialism in these cities."

On 25 September 2022, 'The Socialists' – as the RSP was then called – organized a first national conference with 140 attendees. It was decided to work on a countrywide socialist party. When it was founded 'The Socialists' was supported by councillors in Amsterdam, Rotterdam, Zaanstad, Assen and a member of the provincial council from Utrecht. In addition, ROOD called on its members to join the new party.

At a party congress held in March 2025, it was subsequently decided to continue under the name Revolutionary Socialist Party.

== Ideology ==
The party is largely based on the works of Karl Marx and his ideological descendants without giving a strong preference to specific currents within it. Due to its history as a minority group, the party places a strong emphasis on internal democracy.

The RSP's programme is divided into two parts: a maximum programme outlining its long-term goals, and a minimum programme detailing the short-term steps aimed at achieving those long-term objectives.

The RSP advocates for a radical democratization of society, including the economy. The party identifies as anti-racist, feminist, environmentally conscious, internationalist, and supportive of LGBTQ+ rights.

=== Maximum programme ===
As a long-term goal, the party names "(...) a communist society in the Netherlands, Europe and the world. In such a society, economic production will no longer be driven by the chaos of market forces and profit-seeking, but everyone will contribute according to their ability and everyone will take based on need. It is a stateless society, in which class rule has ceased to exist and in which the role of democracy and the other functions of the state have been absorbed by society as a whole". They also name socialism as a compass towards communism, explicitly stating that they have no blueprint for this.

== Activism ==
In 2024, ROOD, in collaboration with the RSP, started a campaign against NATO in the run-up to the NATO summit in The Hague in 2025. As part of the campaign, ROOD and the RSP gave lectures, took action at defence locations and spread the anti-imperialist message. As part of this campaign, ROOD, together with the RSP and other organizations, organized a counter-summit on June 21 and 22.

On 1 May 2025, RSP members participated in a Labour Day demonstration in Amsterdam, alongside ROOD. They advocated for promoting class struggle, emphasizing the need for revolutionary action beyond parliamentary means. A similar action was carried out in 2026 on the 85th anniversary of the February strike in Amsterdam. The RSP and ROOD argued against the "depoliticized nature of the commemoration".

Following a housing demonstration in Utrecht on 10 May 2025, RSP activists squatted a residence on Mariastraat in protest against vacancy.

On 31 October 2025, the Amsterdam branch organized a demonstration at the US consulate against American involvement in the crisis in Venezuela.

== Local ==
As of 2026, the RSP has a party organization with branches in Amsterdam, Arnhem, Eindhoven, Friesland, Groningen, Nijmegen, Rotterdam, South Limburg, The Hague, Utrecht, and Zwolle.

== Elections ==
The party has participated in two municipal council elections in four cities, initially only as local groups of expelled SP members. In 2026, it first participated in the Nijmegen municipal council election.

Municipal elections
Municipality	2022		2026	
Municipality	Votes (%)	Seats	Votes (%)	Seats
Amsterdam	1,427; 0.5%	0 (Note: In 2022, the Amsterdam branch presented as Democratic Socialists Amsterdam)	5,532; 1.6%	0 (Note: In 2026, the Amsterdam branch participated as part of De Vonk (lit. 'The Spark'))
Nijmegen			837; 0.9%	0
Rotterdam	2,034; 1.0%	0 (Note: In 2022, the Rotterdam branch presented as Socialists 010)	127; 4.1%	0 (Note: In 2026, the Rotterdam branch only participated in the neighborhood of Dijkzigt)
Utrecht	694; 0.4%	0 (Note: In 2022, the Utrecht branch presented as Socialists Utrecht)		
Total	4,155	0	6,496	0
