= Humberto Tan =

Dutch TV and radio presenter

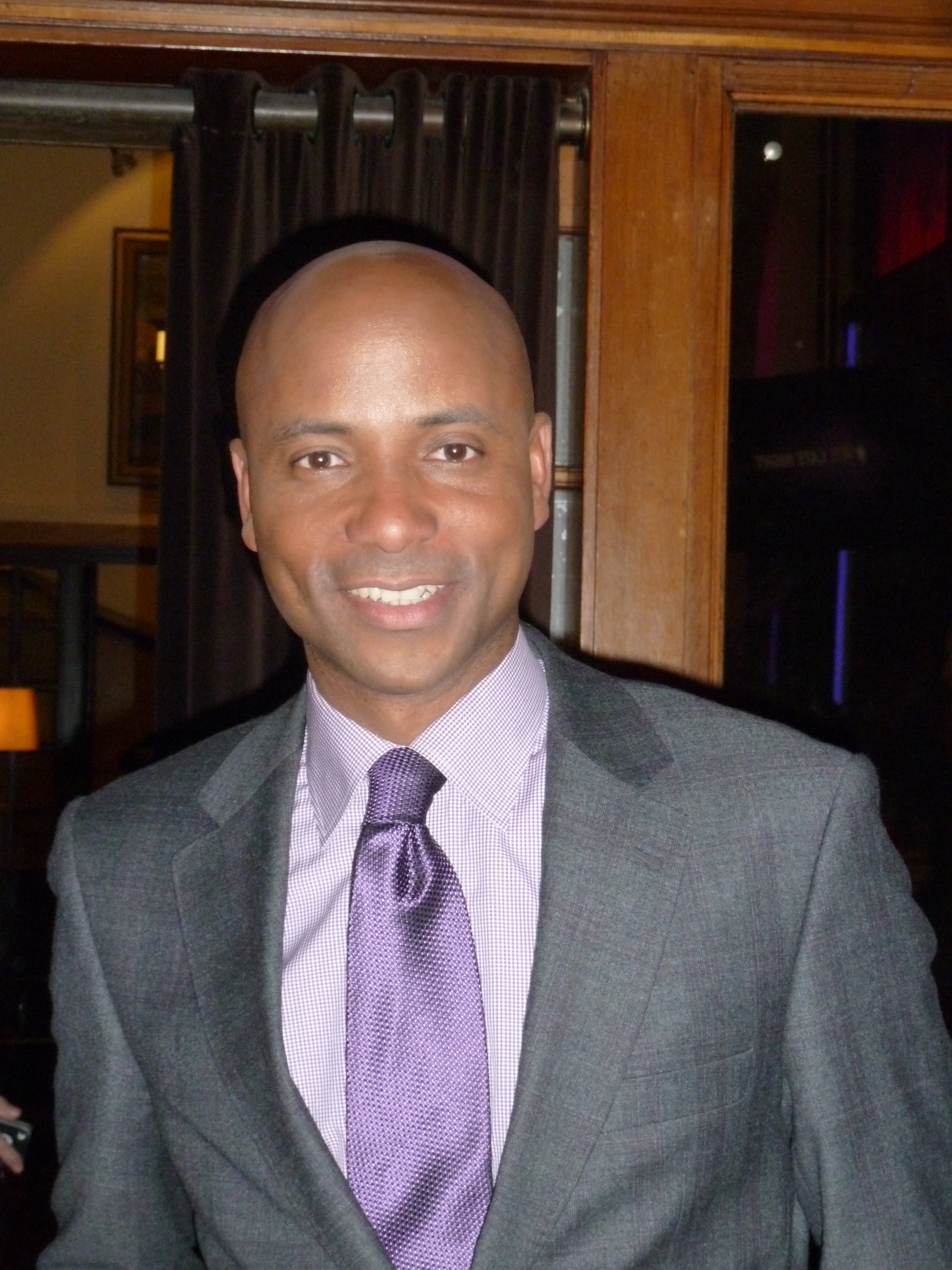
- Humberto Tan in 2015
- Born: Humberto Tan-A-Kiam; October 26, 1965 (age 60); Paramaribo, Suriname
- Years active: 1991–present
- Known for: Dutch radio and television presenter, sports journalist and writer
- Title: Meester in de rechten
- Children: 3

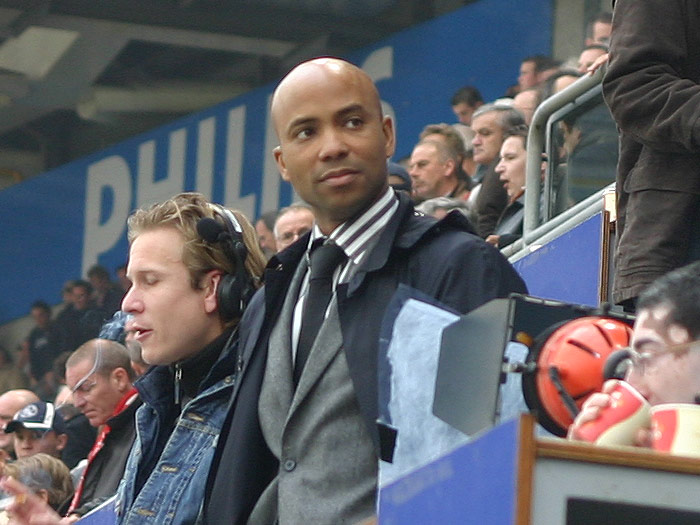
Humberto Tan

Humberto Tan-A-Kiam (Chinese: 陳亞堅; pinyin: Chén yàjiān pha̍k-fa-sṳ: Chhṳ̀n-á-kiân born 26 October 1965), better known as Humberto Tan, is a Dutch radio and television presenter, sports journalist and writer of Surinamese descent.

== Career ==
After obtaining his vwo-diploma Tan studied law at the University of Amsterdam, where he obtained his law degree. He made his television debut on Sonja Barend's talk show as a member of De tafel van 7 (English: "The table of 7"). In 1991 the AVRO hired Tan as editor for the television program Forza TV, which he quickly after started presenting together with Jessica Broekhuis. Two years later he moved to Studio Sport and presented the NOS Journal for some time.

In 1999 and 2020, Tan was chosen as best dressed Dutchman by Esquire.

In 2005, Tan moved to the new television channel Talpa, where he was a sports expert at NSE and presenter of Café de Sport. On 12 July 2007 it was announced that Tan would be transferred to RTL Nederland, where he presented Sunday-night premier league soccer. In 2013 he made a guest appearance on the sketch show TV Kantine as Isaac from The Love Boat.

From 2008 until the summer of 2012, Tan presented De Wedstrijden from the pay TV channel Eredivisie Live. He did a voiceover for the Dutch version of the animation movie Surf's Up in 2007. In 2009, he provided the Dutch voice of Buck the Weasel in the movie Ice Age: Dawn of the Dinosaurs.

Tan appeared regularly on radio channel 538 when the usual DJ Edwin Evers was on vacation. He also was a substitute from 2008 to 2012 for the RTL4 TV program RTL Boulevard. From October 2010 to March 2012, Tan presented the program On the Move for BNR Nieuwsradio. Since 2012, it has been called BNR Humberto Tan. It was broadcast every workday from 6:00AM to 9:30AM.

From 26 August 2013 until 8 June 2018, Tan presented the TV talk show RTL Late Night on RTL 4. He presented this show more than a thousand times. Because of falling viewership ratings he was replaced by Twan Huys, who couldn't save the show from its eventual cancellation on March 4, 2019.

In 2014, Tan released a cd box with his favorite dancing music on it. This 'soundbook' is called Let's Dance and was converted into a live event. On 29 and 30 October 2015 Tan presented the first edition of Let's Dance in the Ziggo Dome.

In 2016, Tan won the first season of the program Jachtseizoen broadcast by StukTV. He was also the winner of the first season of the program Het Perfecte Plaatje (The Perfect Picture), broadcast by RTL 4. In May 2018 it was announced that Tan would be the new presenter of the programs Dance Dance Dance and Holland's Got Talent. Since 2019 Tan has presented the show Voetbal Inside.

In January 2021, Tan returned with a new talkshow, Humberto, on Sunday evening, which ran through the summer. In February 2022, the show returned on Friday afternoon.

== Charitable work ==
Tan is a board member at the foundation Suriprofs & Slachtofferhulp Fund. Since 2002, he has also been an ambassador of the Dutch Red Cross. Further, he has been an ambassador for the Johan Ferrier Fund since 2016, and an ambassador for the World Wide Fund for Nature since 2005. Since 2015, he has been a board member for the Slachtofferhulp Fund. He is also an adviser for the Court in Overijssel. Tan was member of the Sportraad Amsterdam, an advisory body.

== Television ==
Television as presenter
Year	Production	Remarks
1991 – 1993	Forza TV	Presenter
1993 – 2005	NOS Journaal, NOS Studio Sport & NOS Studio Voetbal	Presenter
2005 – 2006	Café de Sport	Presenter
2007 – 2008	RTL Sport (Eredivisie)	Presenter
2008	Mijn man kan niet dansen	Presenter
2008 – 2012	RTL Boulevard	Permanent replacement
2008 – 2013	Eredivisie Live	Presenter
2013 – 2018	RTL Late Night	Presenter
2016	Het zijn net mensen	Presenter
2017 – Present	The Big Music Quiz	Presenter
2018 – Present	Dance Dance Dance	Presenter
2018 – Present	Holland's Got Talent	Presenter
2019 – 2025	VTBL	Presenter
2025–2026	RTL Tonight	Presenter
2025	Gelukkig Hebben We De Foto's Nog	Presenter
Television as actor
Year	Production	Remarks
2007	Surf's up	Voice-over
2009	Ice Age: Dawn of the Dinosaurs	Voice-over for the Buck de Wezel
2013	TV Kantine	Isaac from The Love Boat
1999	Austin Powers:The Spy Who Shagged Me	Co-Pilot #3

== Radio ==
Radio as presenter
Jaar	Productie	Opmerkingen
2009	Evers Staat Op	Temporarily replacement
2010 – 2013	On the Move / BNR Humberto Tan	Presenter

== Awards ==
In March 2014, Tan was chosen by his colleagues as best TV Presenter at The TV-Screens. He also received in both 2014 and 2016 the Silver Televizier-Ster Man. On 25 January 2016, Tan was proclaimed by media magazine Broadcast Magazine as News Presenter of the Year 2015. In October 2016, he won the Sonja Barend Award.

== Private life ==
Tan's mother was the Surinamese-Dutch social worker and women's rights activist Hillegonda Justine "Hilly" Axwijk (nl; 1934–2004), who emigrated to the Netherlands with her children in 1967.

Tan has two daughters (born in 1997 and 2000) and one son (born in 2007).

== Bibliography ==
- 2000 - Het Surinaamse legioen, Surinaamse voetballers in de eredivisie 1954-2000
- 2002 - Het Kleine Verschil (a photo book for the Red Cross)
- 2012 - Rondom Tan
- 2014 - Rondom Tan woman
- 2014 - Als winnen makkelijk was, zou iedereen het doen, Tan's best sport stories
