= Arnout Hoekstra =

Dutch politician

Secretary of the Socialist Party
- In office 14 December 2019 – 2 March 2024
- Preceded by: Lieke Smits (acting)
- Succeeded by: Nils Müller

Personal details
- Born: 2 December 1984 (age 41) Vlaardingen, Netherlands
- Party: Socialist Party

Arnout Hoekstra (born 2 December 1984) is a Dutch politician. He was Lijsttrekker of the Socialist Party (SP) in the 2019 European Parliament election but was not elected as European parliamentarian.

== Biography ==
Hoekstra became a member of the SP when he was 16 years old. After a period on the municipal council of his hometown of Vlaardingen, he became alderman in that municipality in 2011.

At the end of 2018, he resigned in his second term as alderman when the other parties on the council (ONS.Vlaardingen, VVD, GroenLinks and CDA) wanted to stick to a council-wide program instead of a traditional, more limited program.

At his send-off in Vlaardingen, Arnout Hoekstra was honored as 'red alderman' by ROOD, the youth wing of the SP. The media collective DiaMat Kollektiv, affiliated with the Rode Jeugd ('Red Youth'), also dedicated a musical number to the 'Marxist' alderman.

Hoekstra was the lead candidate of the SP in the European Parliament election of 2019. However, the party lost both its seats in the election, meaning that the SP would no longer be represented in the European Parliament.

Hoekstra was elected party secretary of the SP on 14 December 2019. In this position, Hoekstra gained national attention in late 2020 over the conflict between the Socialist Party and ROOD. The leadership of the SP had expelled six members of the youth wing from its ranks, because, according to Hoekstra, these members were planning to start an armed civil war. He based this on passages in the proposed program of the Communist Platform, which these six members had been related to. The expelled members in turn stated that it was a witch-hunt to silence critical SP members. The conflict eventually resulted in a split between the Socialist Party and its youth wing.
