= Communist Platform =

Communist Platform may refer to:

- Communist Platform (Germany)
- Communist Platform (Netherlands)
- Communist Platform (Norway)
