= Communist Platform (Netherlands) =

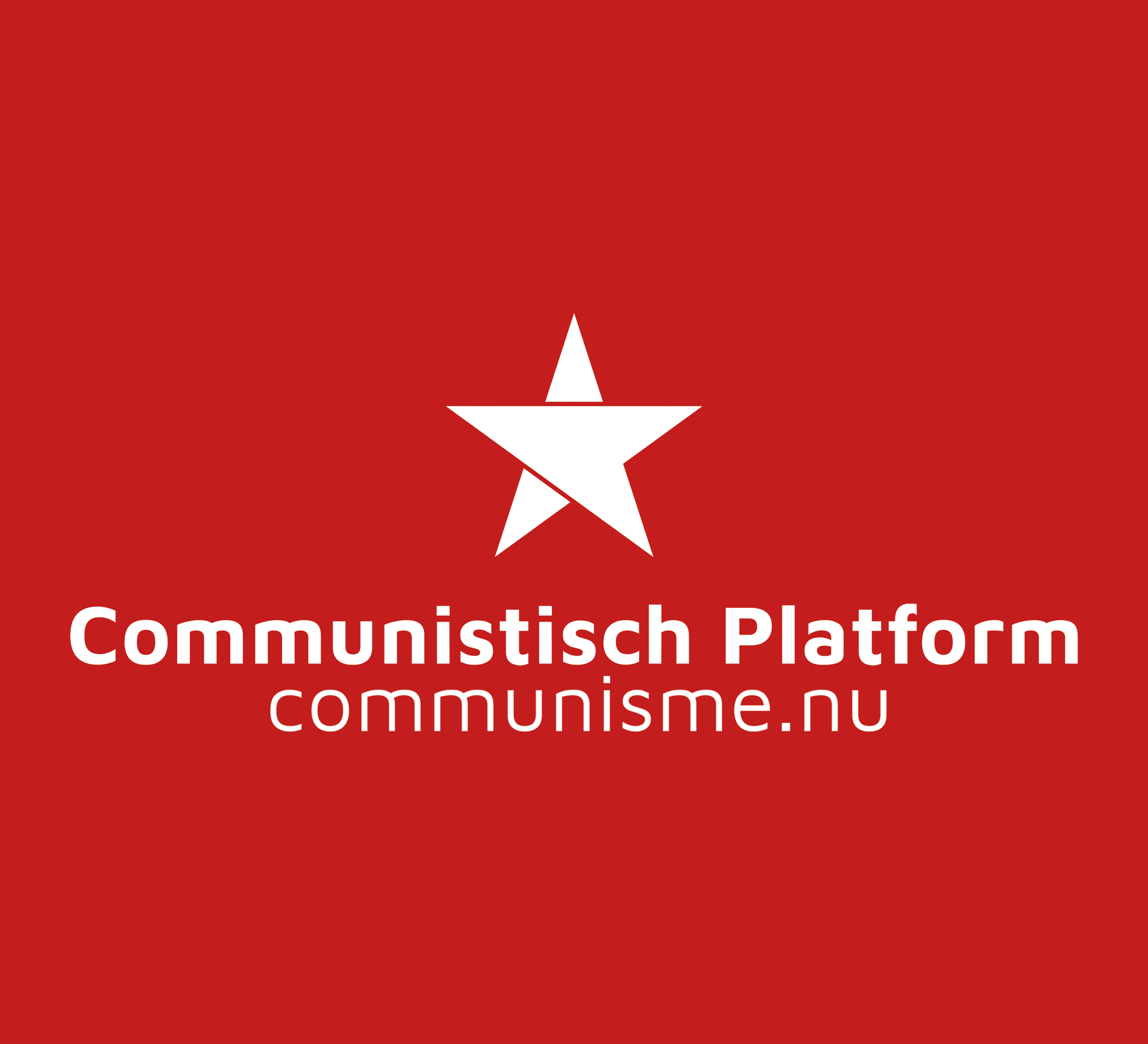
- Founded: 2014
- Ideology: Communism; Orthodox Marxism

Website
- http://www.communisme.nu

The Communist Platform is a Dutch orthodox Marxist political organisation, founded in 2014. The Platform publishes articles about topical and historical political events and developments from a Marxist point of view. The Platform also organises reading groups and seminars on various subjects and translates Marxist works into Dutch. Finally, the Platform participates in the Dutch labour movement, for example by publishing voting recommendations for congresses and leadership elections within the Dutch Socialist Party.

== Ideology ==
The Communist Platform labels itself as orthodox Marxist. The Platform sees the labour movement as an arena for ideological struggle in which communists should fight for a Marxist program. Because of this, the members of the Platform are active within the Socialist Party (SP), trade unions, protest movements and other workers’ organisations. The Platform focuses primarily on influencing the SP through voting recommendations and writing articles that contribute to internal party debates. Additionally, the Platform has written and proposed an alternative, Marxist, program for the SP.

According to the Communist Platform, this program, named A Compass for the SP is a return to the ‘fundamental struggle against capitalism’ as it was described in earlier SP programs. The program calls amongst other things for the establishment of a democratic republic, workers’ militias, an elected judicial system and the nationalisation of the economy and healthcare.

Ideologically, the Communist Platform is inspired by the party movements of the Marxist parties of the 19th and early 20th century. Karl Kautsky is often heralded for his role in the forging of the SPD party movement and his influence on the Russian October Revolution. Kautsky is also heavily criticised by the Platform for his later role in the rightward turn of the SPD and his support for social democracy against Marxism after the split in the Second International.

Democratisation of the labour movement is a spearhead of the Communist Platform. It sees democratisation as a precondition for a healthy labour movement and a truly communist society. For this reason, the Communist Platform puts a lot of emphasis on the importance of organised discussion and debate. They engage in polemics with other left-wing organisations to advance the movement as a whole ideologically through the clashing of ideas.

The organisation sees internationalism as a precondition for a viable alternative to capitalism. More concretely, it puts a lot of emphasis on a pan-European political approach and takes up calls for Communist Party of the European Union and a Democratic Republic of Europe.

== History and activities ==
The Communist Platform was founded in 2014. Since its foundation it has mainly focussed on organising educational events and publishing articles and voting advices for members of the Socialist Party. In June 2020, the Communist Platform took the initiative for the Marxist Forum, according to its website an "authentic, democratic Marxist wing" in the Socialist Party. The Marxist Forum organises meetings for SP-members where they discuss the SP's course and where motions are formulated to carry at party congresses.

In October 2020 five SP members were expelled from the party for alleged membership of the Communist Platform and/or the Marxist Forum, which both are marked as independent political parties by the SP's leadership. Amongst the expelled members there was at least one branch chairperson and a few board members of various branches. In November, a sixth member was expelled on the same grounds as the previous five SP members.

In response to the expulsions, SP against the Witch-hunt was launched in November 2020. SP against the Witch-hunt is a campaign that calls for the annulment of the expulsions, for immediate cessation of marking the Communist Platform and the Marxist Forum as independent political parties and in favour of the right to form factions in the SP.

On November 16 the expulsions of the alleged CP members became national news due to an episode of the popular news show Nieuwsuur. In this episode, SP general secretary Arnout Hoekstra claimed that the six expelled members planned to start an armed civil war. The expelled SP members claim that their expulsions are part of a witch-hunt that aims to silence dissident members, specifically in the context of a controversial strive of the SP leadership to enter in a coalition. Political commentator Nynke de Zoeten places the expulsions in the context of a party leadership that has expressed interest in entering a government coalition with the VVD, something which parts of the SP membership do not agree with.

On November 17 the SP party leader Lilian Marijnissen expressed her support for the expulsions. She endorses the explanation that the six expelled members strive for a violent civil war. The Communist Platform denies these allegations. The chairperson of ROOD, the youth wing of the SP defended the expelled members in the Volkskrant. He denies that the expulsions have anything to do with policies of the Communist Platform, and instead he claims the expulsions are the consequence of internal political strife.

On November 21 the board of ROOD published an article in which they spoke out against the statements of Arnout Hoekstra. They claimed that his remarks about an upcoming coup in ROOD was unfounded, especially given the fact that the situation involved active members being elected in a democratic process. The claims of preparing for a civil war were also labeled as "unfounded" by the board.

On November 22 Olaf Kemerink, one of the expelled members was elected as chairman to ROOD with 75% of the votes. The party leadership of the Socialist Party responded to Nieuwsuur that they would get into contact with the board of ROOD, and a decision would soon follow.

== International ==
The Communist Platform has ties with the Communist Party of Great-Britain (PCC). This is a successor to the disintegrated Communist Party of Great Britain. Members of the Communist Platform have visited the summer school of the CPGB (PCC) in the past.
