= Marc Chavannes =

Dutch professor for journalism (1946–2024)

Marc E. Chavannes (The Hague, 20 September 1946 – 10 January 2024) was a Dutch professor for journalism at Groningen University and active journalist, Correspondent (in London, Paris and Washington D.C.) and commentator e.g. for NRC Handelsblad. Chavannes died on 10 January 2024, at the age of 77.

== Prizes ==
- 1988: Prijs voor de Dagbladjournalistiek
- 2004: Anne Vondelingprijs
- 2020 Anne Vondelingprijs
