= Cisca Dresselhuys =

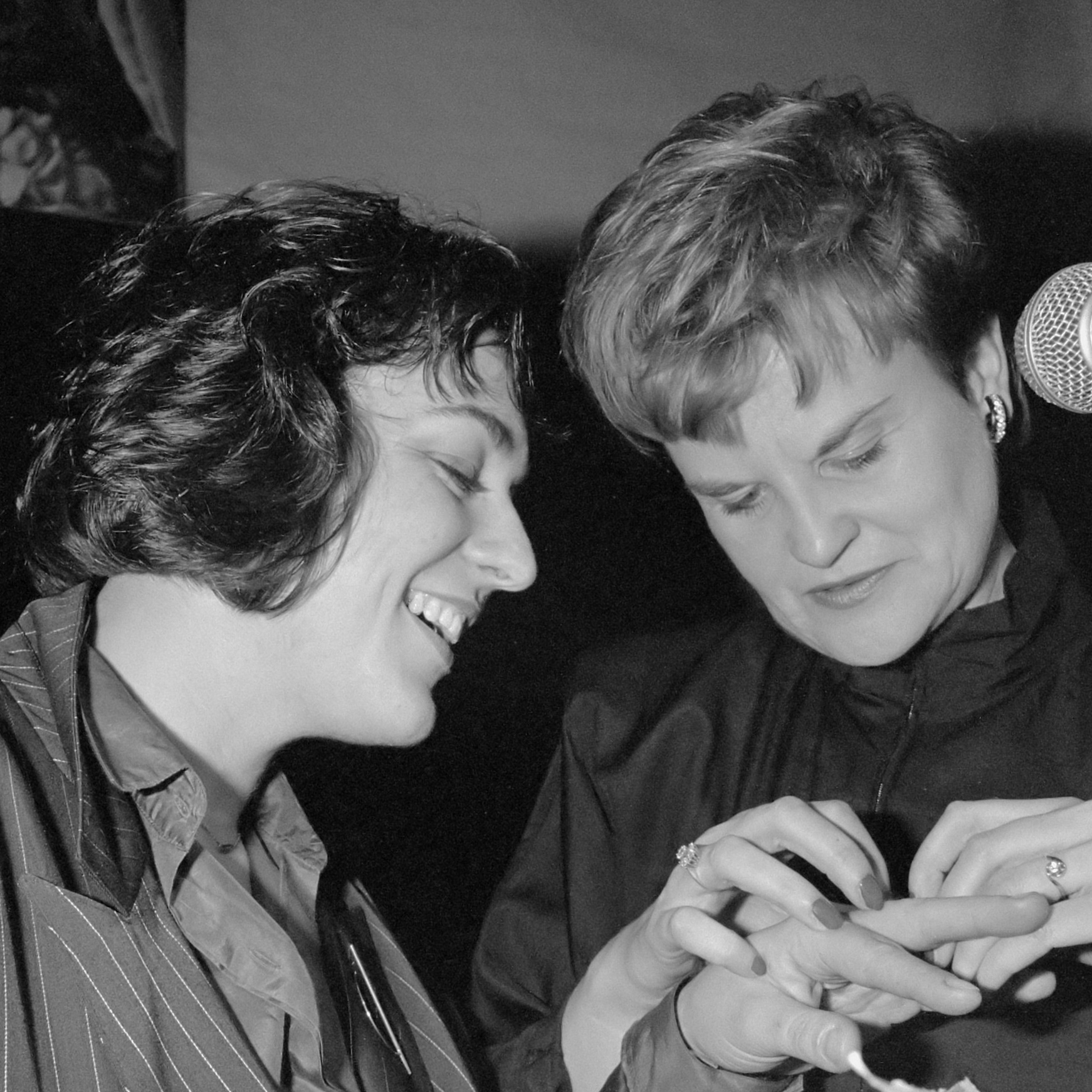
Lola Verkuil and Cisca Dresselhuys (r.) (1987)

Francisca Wilhelmina "Cisca" Dresselhuys (born 21 April 1943 in Leeuwarden) was the first head editor of the Dutch feminist monthly magazine Opzij from 1 November 1981 until 1 April 2008. Her journalistic career started at the daily Trouw.

== Biography ==
Dresselhuys grew up as an afterthought with an older brother and two older sisters, the youngest of whom was nine when she was born. When she was 11, she lost her father.

Dresselhuys began as a telexist at daily newspaper Trouw, where she was then a journalist, starting in 1981, she was chief editor of monthly magazine Opzij for more than 25 years. She became best known for her column "Langs de feministische meetlat", in which she interviewed 175 well-known men over a period of 16 years and gave them a grade for their feminist stance. Many of these interviews were later published in anthologies.

On 11 June 2001, she received the Anne Vondeling prize for her publications in the year 2000. For the award she received 5000 guilders and a sculpture of Anne Vondeling.

As a republican, Dresselhuys opined that the abdication of Beatrix in 2013 should have been seized to abolish the Dutch monarchy. Although she was quite content with Máxima's efforts for the emancipation of women thus far, it was unjust how her position as the king's wife was subordinate, despite her misleading style of 'Queen'. In case of a new female head of state, Dresselhuys preferred a president heading a republic 'who has to deserve it, has to fight, take responsibility.'

== Work ==
- Drukker dan ooit. Werken na je 65ste (2011). Just Publishers. ISBN 9789089751577
