= RTL Late Night =

Dutch talk show

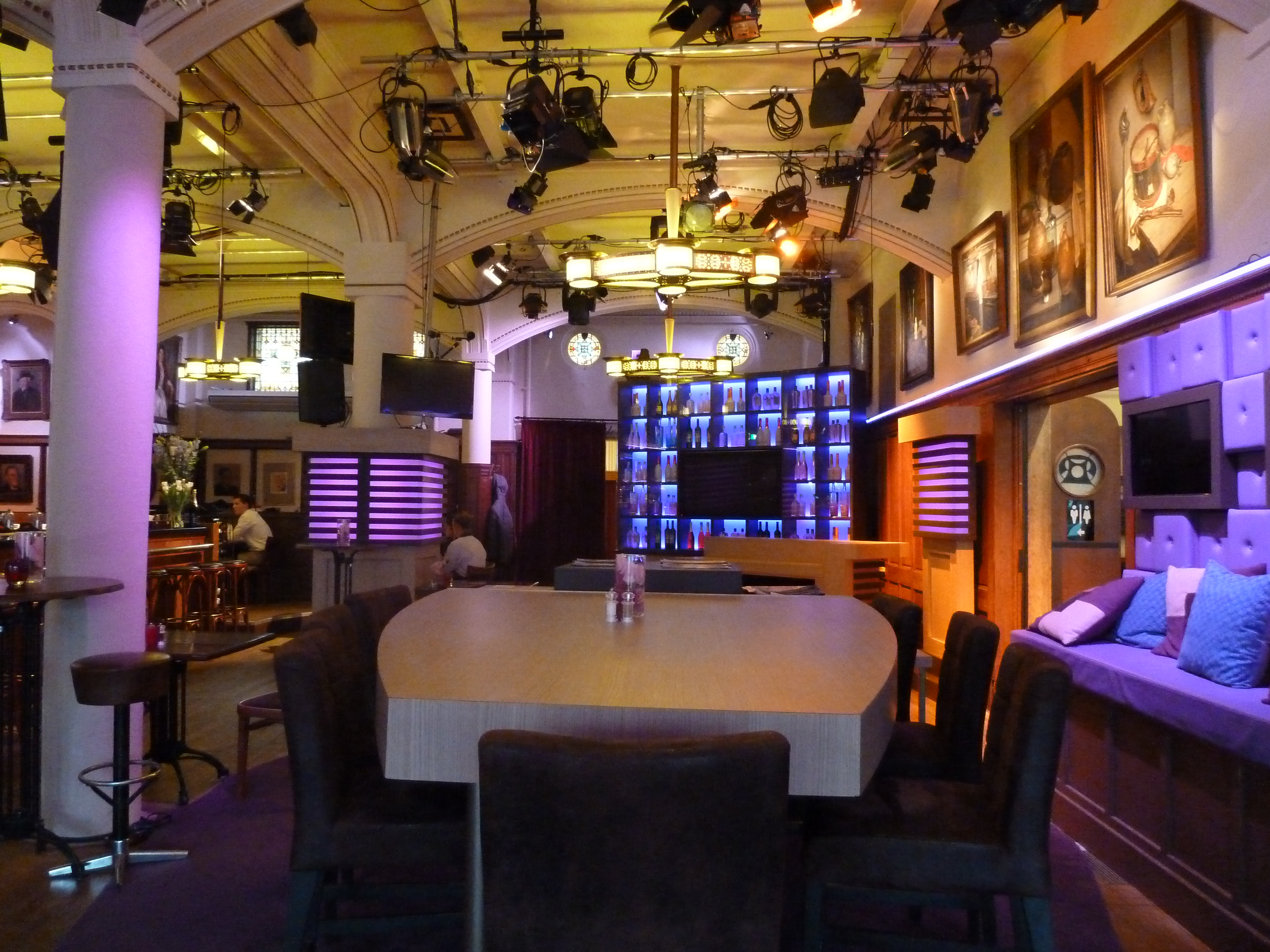
- Genre: Talk show
- Presented by: Humberto Tan; Twan Huys
- Theme music composer: Stephen Emmer
- Country of origin: Netherlands
- Original language: Dutch

Production
- Producer: Fremantle
- Production locations: NH Schiller Hotel, Amsterdam
- Running time: 60 minutes
- Production company: RTL Nederland

Original release
- Network: RTL 4
- Release: 26 August 2013 – 4 March 2019

RTL Late Night is a Dutch late night television talk show. It was broadcast from August 26, 2013, to March 4, 2019, on commercial station RTL 4 on weekdays between 22:30 and 23:40.

== Background ==
In the daily program, guests are seated at a table to discuss current news or sport topics. Richard Groenendijk, Jan Heemskerk, Jan van Hooff, Goedele Liekens, Frits Spits, Saskia Noort, Arjan Postma, Gerard Ekdom and Jan Jaap van der Wal had a recurring appearance in the show's broadcasts. Luuk Ikink and Marieke Elsinga were among those who discussed the most striking news of the day and the best virals or videos.

The recordings were initially from the American Hotel in the capital city Amsterdam, but since April 2014 the studio is located in NH Schiller Hotel in the same city.

== Change of host ==
RTL Late Night was hosted by Humberto Tan, who made it an instant success. After a period of declining views and media-backlash, Tan announced his departure in February 2018. His final shows, in the week of 4 June, were full of surprises including a 13-minute version of Roast. Twan Huys replaced Tan for what became the final months of RTL Late Night.
