= Henk Spaan =

Dutch television presenter, columnist, journalist and actor

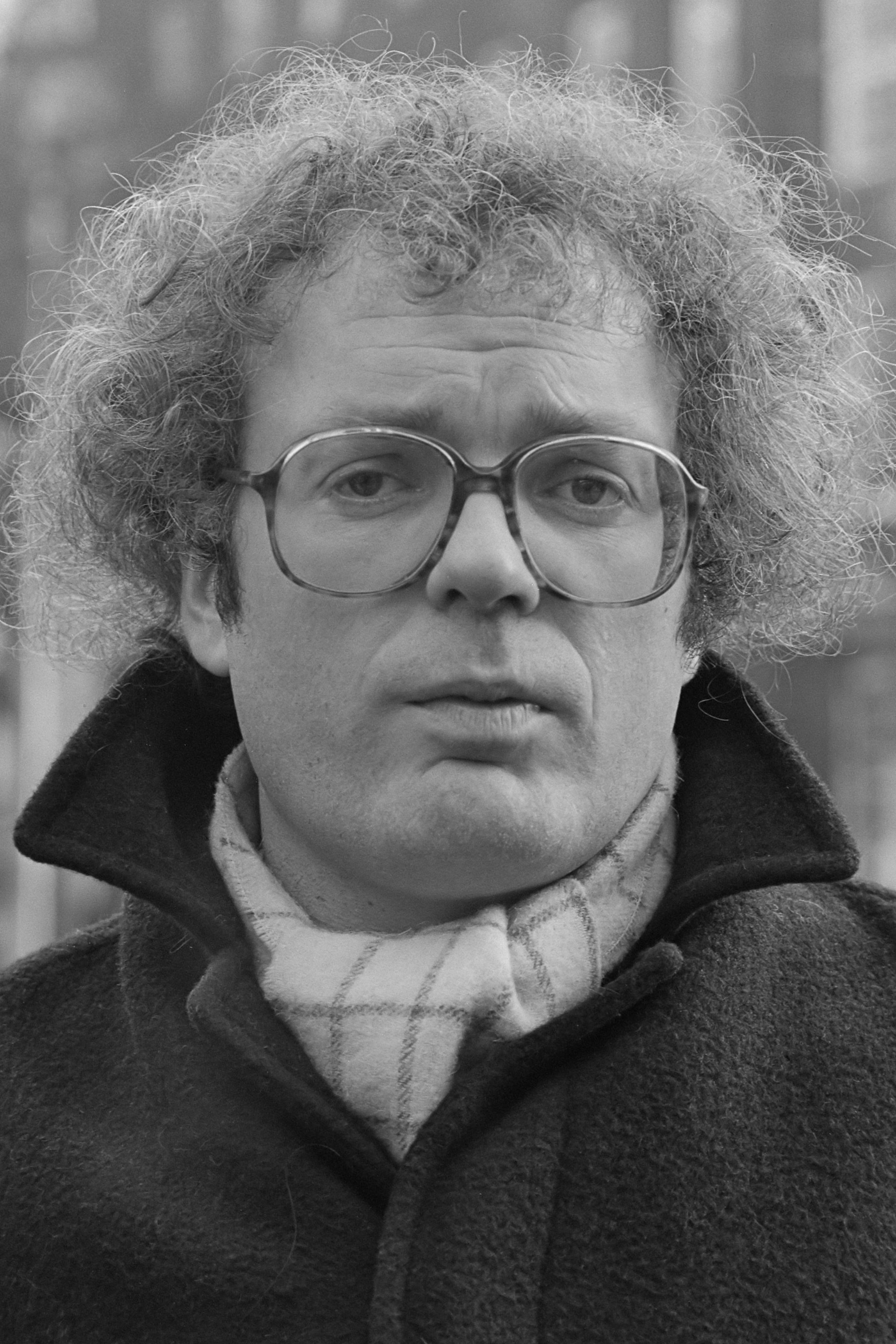
- Born: Hendrik Gerardus Maria Spaan; 30 September 1948 (age 77) 't Kruis, Heerhugowaard, the Netherlands
- Occupations: Journalist, television presenter, columnist, and author
- Years active: 1978–present
- Website: IMDb Profile

Hendrik Gerardus Maria Spaan (born 30 September 1948) is a Dutch sports journalist, television presenter, author, and columnist. Spaan is best known for a series of Dutch-language TV programs he developed in collaboration with Harry Vermeegen between 1982 and 1996 including Pisa, Verona, Die 2 and Die 2: Nieuwe Koeien.

== Biography ==
=== Early life ===
Spaan grew up in Tuinstad Slotermeer in Amsterdam. He studied Dutch writing and linguistics between 1968 and 1973 as an undergraduate at the University of Amsterdam. Spaan would never make use of the teaching certification that he received upon the completion of his studies. While in university Spaan worked as the editor of the student publication Propria Cures. Following graduation, he became a columnist for the newspapers Het Parool en de Haagse Post. He was only 23 years old at the time.

In 1973 Spaan published his first poetry collection, Een lach en een traan. He also wrote children's books with Dutch author Guus Luijters and radio plays with Ischa Meijer. In the mid-1970s Spaan began to take part in a variety of radio programs. His best known radio work from the period is the VPRO-forum he participated in with Ischa Meijer, Cees Nooteboom, Mensje van Keulen en Wim T. Schippers.

=== Collaboration with Harry Vermeegen ===
In 1975 Spaan became the presenter for VARA's Tussen Start en Finish. The series went on to win the Zilveren Reissmicrofoon, and it was through Tussen Start en Finish that Spaan began his collaboration with Harry Vermeegen.

In 1982 the duo launched the satirical television show Pisa. The first episodes were only 10 minutes long but the show nonetheless attracted over 4.5 million viewers over the course of its first season. The second season of Pisa saw an extended format, and some of the program's segments, in particular Popie Jopie en De Gewone Man, became extremely popular in the Netherlands.

In late 1985 Dutch radio disc jockey Rob Out brought Spaan and Vermeegen aboard for his radio and TV-broadcaster Veronica. Pisa was discontinued and replaced with Verona, which was itself a very popular in the Dutch market. The program's success owed a particular debt to the recurring segments De Verpleegster, Radio Perfecto, Noordzee TV, De Boerderie, and Bovenop het Nieuws, which featured a weekly recurring line "Koud hè?!" ("Cold, huh?!") that gained national notoriety.

Following the third season of Verona Spaan & Vermeegen again decided to begin a new project and launched the series Die 2. Two well-known characters from Verona, Linda Dubbeldeman (portrayed by Brenda Steunbeer) en Ferry de Groot (portrayed by Arie Boksbeugel), did not reappear after Verona was discontinued. Die 2 represented Spaan and Vermeegen's first and only sitcom-series about finding the perfect location for a sitcom-series. It was followed by Die 2 Speciaal, in which the pair travelled the world promoting the Netherlands. Alongside their work on TV and radio programs, Spaan and Vermeegen also worked as presenters for sporting events like the UEFA European Championship, the World Cup, and the 1992 Olympic Games in Barcelona.

Since 1993 Spaan and Vermeegen have focused solely on sports programming, and in particular football, with the TV program Die 2: Nieuwe Koeien.

=== Breakup and solo career ===
Over the course of 1994 Spaan worked on the TV programs Back to the Sixties and Back to the Seventies. He also made contributions to the football magazine Hard Gras. His work on these projects led Spaan to invest less energy in his collaboration with Vermeegen on Die 2: Nieuwe Koeien. Spaan's focus on his own projects led Vermeegen end their collaboration in 1996 and launch his own solo career with help from producer John de Mol jr. Spaan and Vermeegen completed the final season of Die 2: Nieuwe Koeien prior to parting ways.

Spaan then launched the TV show Hard Gras, which was forced to compete for popularity with Vermeegen's new series De Regenjas. Hard gras was cancelled after its first season. It was only after he returned to Dutch public broadcaster VARA in 2000 that Spaan began again to work on a tone-setting football program: Studio Spaan with Erik van Muiswinkel and Diederik van Vleuten. Their characters were a source of inspiration for the Dutch satirical TV series Kopspijkercabaret. Studio Spaan ran for four seasons. In 2011 Spaan and Dutch public broadcaster PowNed launched a second season of Hard Gras 15 years after the first season was released.

In 2018 Spaan and Vermeegen appeared together in an episode of the documentary series TV Monument, through their interviews were conducted separately. Spaan stated in a 2021 interview that while Vermeegen was normally cast as a cheerful character and Spaan a grumpy one, their personalities in real life were very much the opposite of the characters they portrayed.

== Published work ==
Spaan specializes in football analysis. He launched Hard gras in 1994 in collaboration with Matthijs van Nieuwkerk. The publication was intended to be a "football magazine for readers." In 2007 Spaan worked to turn Hard gras into a theatrical production alongside a large group of collaborators including van Nieuwkerk, Anna Enquist, Herman Koch, Hugo Borst en P.F. Thomése.

Spaan is a football columnist for Het Parool. He also appears weekly on the TV program De ochtend on Dutch broadcaster NPO 1.

Spaan has published four poetry collections:

- Een lach en een traan (1973)
- De zoon van Cruijff (1995)
- Maldini heeft een zus (2000)
- De kop van Kuijt (2006)

A collection of Spaan's newspaper columns appeared in the 2007 book Alle dagen voetbal. In May 2009 a French-language book about Spaan's home in France was published entitled Les carottes sont cuites. In 2014 Spaan published his first novel, Oude vrienden. In 2016 he published a second novel, De binnentuin, and in 2018 he came out with a third book, Nouri. De belofte. In 2021 Spaan published Stappen tellen.

Spaan appeared in an episode of the RTL series Baantjer entitled De Cock en de moord op de schrijver in which he plays the corpse of Harry Schrijver.
