= Nova (Dutch TV program) =

Late-evening current affairs programme in the Netherlands

- Also known as: NOVA
- Genre: Current affairs
- Directed by: Carel Kuyl
- Presented by: Clairy Polak; Joost Karhof; Twan Huys
- Country of origin: Netherlands
- Original language: Dutch

Production
- Running time: 25 minutes
- Production companies: Omroepvereniging VARA; Nederlandse Omroep Stichting; Nederlandse Programma Stichting

Original release
- Network: Nederland 3 (1992–2006); Nederland 2 (2006–2010)
- Release: 28 September 1992 – 4 September 2010

Related
- Nieuwsuur (2010–present)

NOVA was a Dutch late-evening current affairs programme, initially co-produced by public broadcasters VARA and NOS, and latterly by VARA and NPS, alongside Den Haag Vandaag ("The Hague Today"), the segment of the programme covering events in parliament and interviews with politicians, which was produced by the NOS. It was broadcast as NOVA/Den Haag Vandaag from Monday to Saturday, on Nederland 3 from 1992 to 2006, and from 2006 to 2010 on Nederland 2.

The programme was also broadcast on the Dutch international television channel BVN.

== History ==
NOVA was first broadcast on 28 September 1992 on Nederland 3, as a result of the merger of two programmes: NOS-Laat, produced by the NOS, and Achter het Nieuws, produced by VARA. The name of the programme, NOVA, was chosen as a portmanteau of the names of NOS and VARA, with the extra result of it being Latin for "new". The new programme was broadcast six days a week, which enabled more comprehensive coverage of national and global events, especially compared to the previous situation, when a different current affairs programme aired each day, each one being produced by a different broadcaster. The example of co-operation between different public broadcasters was emulated on the other public channels, with the production of programmes such as Netwerk on Nederland 1 and TweeVandaag on Nederland 2.

In 2002, plans to turn NOVA into a talk show, in a similar vein to the successful Barend & Van Dorp on RTL 4, leaked to Dutch media. The single-presenter setup was to be changed to two presenters, with a studio audience: one of the planned pairings was to be Felix Rottenberg and Matthijs van Nieuwkerk, who had fronted a successful series in the run-up to the 2003 elections. The three presenters of NOVA at that time, Rob Trip, Kees Driehuis and Margriet Vroomans, were unaware of these plans until they were leaked to the media, and resigned as a result. Rottenberg and van Nieuwkerk resigned in February 2003; the editor-in-chief of NOVA, Rik Rensen, followed suit in April 2003. The use of studio audience would remain in use, only for special editions until the show's demise.

In September 2006, a major re-organisation of the Dutch public television stations took place, in order to give each channel a more distinct character: Nederland 1 became a mainstream, generalist channel; Nederland 2, the channel for more in-depth programming, and Nederland 3 was to become a youth channel. As a result of this, NOVA moved to Nederland 2, where it remained until the programme's end in 2010.

The NOS announced in January 2010 that production of NOVA was to cease from autumn that year, to be replaced by Nieuwsuur, a co-production between NOS and NPS, without the participation of VARA; the programme combines news, in-depth analysis and sports news. The final edition of NOVA aired on 4 September 2010, with Nieuwsuur beginning two days later, on 6 September 2010.

== Presenters ==
=== NOVA ===
Presenter	Years
Clairy Polak	2003–2010
Twan Huys	2006–2010
Joost Karhof	2006–2010

=== Den Haag Vandaag ===
The Hague Today was an integral part of NOVA, produced by the NOS. This section mainly contained parliamentary reports and was presented from The Hague by Pim van Galen, Joost Karhof or Ferry Mingelen; the latter was also a co-presenter of NOVA Politics on Friday.

Before the inception of NOVA, The Hague Today was an independent programme, reporting and commenting on developments in politics in The Hague, as well as broadcasting excerpts from parliamentary debates.
