= Twan Huys =

Dutch journalist (born 1964)

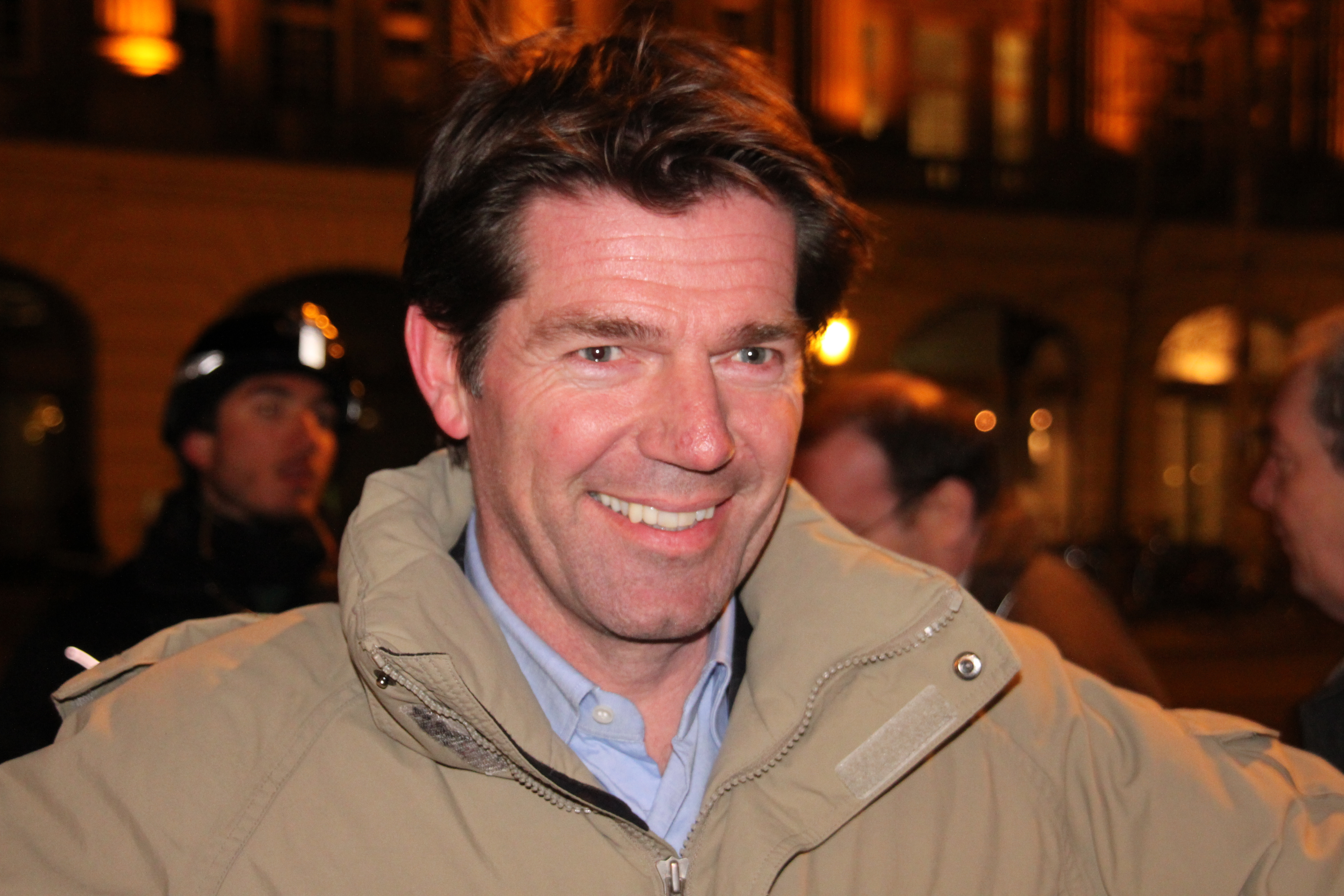
- Twan Huys in 2010
- Born: 24 March 1964 (age 62); Sevenum, Netherlands
- Occupations: Journalist, television presenter, author
- Known for: Nieuwsuur, College Tour, NOVA, Buitenhof

Twan Huys (born 24 March 1964) is a Dutch journalist, television presenter and author. He was the presenter of the Dutch TV shows Nieuwsuur and College Tour. Previously, he worked as a correspondent and presenter for NOVA. The format of College Tour was conceived by Huys while working as a U.S. correspondent in New York City and Washington, D.C. from 1999 until 2007.

== Early life and career ==
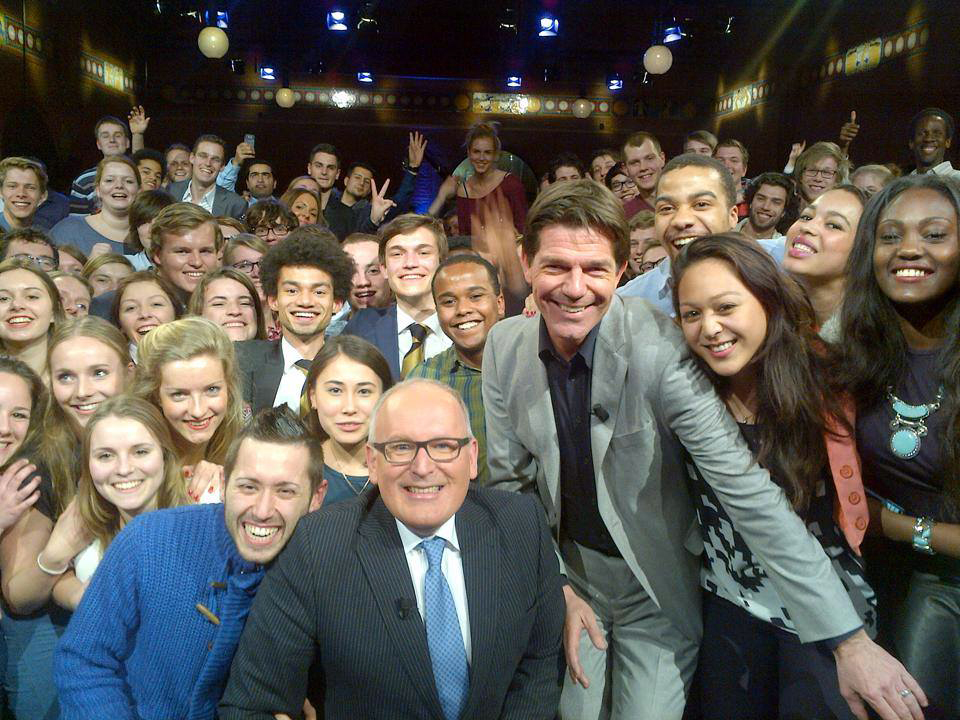
Huys with his audience and Frans Timmermans, Minister of Foreign Affairs (2014)

Huys studied at the Academy for Journalism in Tilburg from 1983 until 1986, after which he went to work for the regional broadcasting company in the Dutch province of Limburg. He then worked for STAD Radio Amsterdam and VARA. From 1992 until September 2010, he worked for news program NOVA, and from that month onwards, he has worked for NOVA's successor, Nieuwsuur.

In 2018 he took over the talkshow RTL Late Night from Humberto Tan after declining views; he couldn't prevent its eventual cancellation and left after one season. Since 2020 he's one of the three regular hosts of Buitenhof, a weekly Dutch political interview programme on Sunday afternoon.

He is married to Cheryl Franks, a Brit, and they have two children: a son Jack and a daughter Dylan Rose. Cheryl is a yoga teacher. They have been married since 2007.

== Books ==
- (1994) In opdracht van Hare Majesteit (On behalf of Her Majesty)
- (2006) Ik ben een New Yorker (I am a New Yorker)
- (2009) Meesters (Masters)
- (2010) Over geluk (On happiness)
- (2013) Dertien meesters, één crimineel (Thirteen masters, one criminal)
- (2016) De Clintons (The Clintons)
- (2020) Wandellust (Love of Walking)
- (2026) Het Droompad (The Dream Path)
