= Margreet ter Woerds =

Dutch film producer and journalist

Margreet ter Woerds (1961) is a Dutch journalist and film producer.

Ter Woerds, who originated in Haaksbergen studied history at the Free University Amsterdam and specialised herself in non-western sociology, mostly that of Latin America. She was staying in the Dominican Republic for her graduation in 1985/86 and she wrote about the South African sugar industry. In 1989 she graduated. In the time after that, she wrote for trade magazines about this continent. After her graduation she worked as a press officer and (media)trainer at VluchtelingenWerk Nederland.

From 1995 until 2007 Ter Woerds lived in Moscow, Russia. Here she studied Russian and worked as a journalist and photographer for news papers like Trouw, the Volkskrant, De Morgen, The Agrarisch Dagblad daily paper and multiple week and trade magazines. Ter Woerds has, as a producer, researcher and documentary maker, many television productions for national and international to her name, for programmes such as Netwerk, IKON, VRT, VTM, ZDF, NDR, Schweizer Fernsehen, Channel 4, BBC, TV2-Norway, Al Jazeera International, National Geographic Channel and Discovery Channel. She also set up a production bureau in Russia. Apart from that she made multiple information and recruitment films for the NGO's Aids Foundation East West (AFEW) and downside up, which is committed to the improvement of children with down syndrome in the Russian Federation. Nowadays Ter Woerds is active as an independent documentary maker and producer in the Netherlands.

In 2005 Ter Woerds won an Emmy Award for Return to Beslan, about how the South-Russian city Beslan was holding up shortly after in September 2004 it had dealt with a deeply impacting siege in a middle school, the so-called hostage of Beslan. This documentary was broadcast by NCRV-Network.

In 2006 the documentary A prayer for Beslan received from TV2 Norway a Moondance Columbine Award and a Zolotoi Glagol, a Russian media prize for foreign journalists. The documentary follows a couple people in the first few years after the siege. Ter Woerds did the research, the interviews and the production.
