= Matthijs van Nieuwkerk =

Dutch presenter and journalist

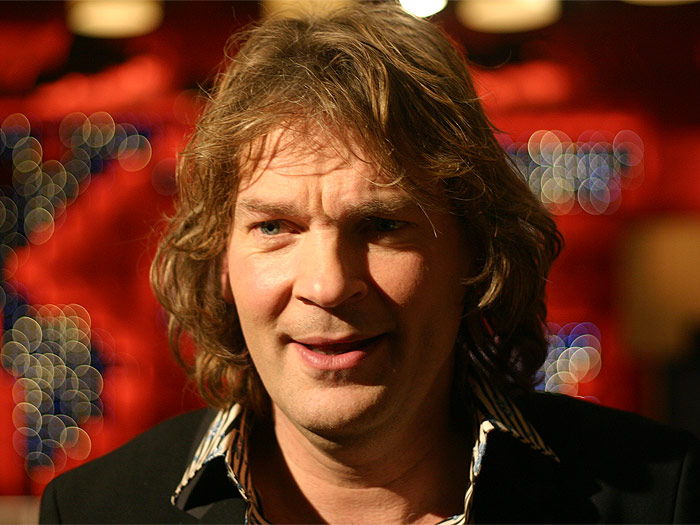
- Born: 8 September 1960 (age 65); Amsterdam, Netherlands
- Occupations: Journalist, television presenter
- Spouse: Karin
- Children: Kees and Jet

Matthijs van Nieuwkerk (Dutch pronunciation: [mɑˈtɛis fɑ ˈniukɛr(ə)k]; born 8 September 1960) is a Dutch journalist and television presenter. He is best known for hosting the daily De Wereld Draait Door (DWDD) television show from 2005 to 2020.

== Biography ==
Matthijs van Nieuwkerk was born in Amsterdam. In 1980 he started his study Dutch language at the University of Amsterdam, which he never finished.

With his childhood friend Mark van den Heuvel, van Nieuwkerk started his career in journalism interviewing sportsmen and sportswomen for the Dutch newspaper Het Parool. Interviewees included chess grandmasters Kasparov and Karpov, and footballer Johnny Rep. Soon after, he also started interviewing writers, and he was responsible for renewing the literary section of the newspaper. In 1988, he became an editor for the arts section. In 1996, he was promoted to editor-in-chief of Het Parool.

In 2001 he became the editor-in-chief of AT5, the local television channel of Amsterdam. However, in 2002 he transferred to national television when he became the net coordinator of the Dutch public channel Nederland 3. Out of frustration with the inner workings of the Dutch public broadcasting system (which stood in the way of the changes he envisioned), van Nieuwkerk quit his job. After six months, he started working in front of the cameras. Ahead of the 2003 elections, he presented the political programme Nederland Kiest with Felix Rottenberg. The duo started presenting Nova, a Dutch programme about politics, but they both quit after a conflict with the editorial staff.

In 2005 van Nieuwkerk started his daily talk show De Wereld Draait Door (literal translation: The World Keeps on Turning; "draait door" is also figurative speech for "goes crazy"), a popular show that airs on weekdays. The programme received the 2007 Gouden Televizier-Ring (the Dutch equivalent of the Emmy Awards) for best TV programme.

Another successful programme of his is Holland Sport, a Monday night programme in which he and co-presenter Wilfried de Jong discuss sports. Leo Blokhuis (a music expert) and van Nieuwkerk created and still present the annual Popquiz and Top 2000 à Go-Go.

Van Nieuwkerk was nominated for the Zilveren Televizier-Ster for best show host in 2006 and 2007, but didn't win on either occasion.

On 12 February 2020 it was announced that Matthijs van Nieuwkerk would stop with his programme De Wereld Draait Door after the current series, due to finish on 27 March 2020. At the same time van Nieuwkerk is reported to have signed up with BNNVARA (Dutch public broadcaster) for another three years and that he is in the process of setting up a series Saturday evening programmes for them, due to run from January 2021.

== Accusations of bullying ==
An article in de Volkskrant newspaper in November 2022, reported accusations of systematic bullying by van Nieuwkerk during the lifetime of De Wereld Draait Door. In particular, it pointed to repeated instances of van Nieuwkerk shouting and threatening editors of the programme. In a written reply, also published by the newspaper, van Nieuwkerk indicated that there were some editors he did not get on so well with, but had a strong working relationship with other editors.

== Other media ==
Van Nieuwkerk established the football magazine 'Hard Gras' with Henk Spaan and wrote several books for it. He likes football and he plays the 'Buitenveldert' team along with Frits Barend. Van Nieuwkerk also played judo, volleyball, baseball, and cricket.

Youth magazine J/M had van Nieuwkerk as a writer of columns, and he helped write a book about fathers.

In the Baantjer episode "De Cock en de man die weg wilde", he played a journalist.

== Family ==
Van Nieuwkerk divorced his wife Karin in 2021. They have a son, Kees (named after "Kees de jongen", a popular Dutch book), and a daughter, Jet. He and his family live in Amsterdam, and he also owns a house in the Achterhoek region of the Netherlands.

== Television ==
Below are some of the programmes van Nieuwkerk currently presents or has presented in the past:

- Prima Vista, VPRO, 1991;
- De Gids, a late night show by VARA;
- TV3, a cultural debate programme by the NPS, presented with Hadassah de Boer;
- Popquiz à Go-Go, a music programme by the NPS;
- Top 2000 à Go-Go, specifically made for Radio 2's Top 2000, since 2002;
- Top 2000 in Concert, also made for Radio 2, since 2003;
- Nederland Kiest and Nova, with Felix Rottenberg;
- FC Godenzonen, an AT5 programme from 2003;
- Holland Sport, with Wilfried de Jong, since 2003;
- De Wereld Draait Door, since 2005;
- Wat Heet!, since 14 May 2007;
- De Zomer Draait Door, since 2 June 2007.
