= NRC (newspaper) =

Dutch daily newspaper

NRC Handelsblad

- Front page of 11 February 2014
- Type: Daily newspaper (no Sunday edition)
- Format: 41.5 cm × 28 cm
- Owner: Mediahuis
- Editor-in-chief: Patricia Veldhuis
- Founded: 1970; 56 years ago (by merger)
- Political alignment: Liberalism
- Language: Dutch
- Headquarters: Rokin 65; Amsterdam, Netherlands
- Circulation: 202.097 (2017)
- ISSN: 0002-5259
- Website: www.nrc.nl (in Dutch)

NRC, previously NRC Handelsblad (Dutch pronunciation: [ˌɛnɛrseː ˈɦɑndəlzblɑt]), is a daily morning newspaper published in the Netherlands by Mediahuis NRC. It is widely regarded as a newspaper of record in the country.

== History ==
NRC Handelsblad was first published on 1 October 1970 after a merger of the Amsterdam newspaper Algemeen Handelsblad (founded 1828 by Jacob Willem van den Biesen) and the Rotterdam Nieuwe Rotterdamsche Courant (founded 1844 by Henricus Nijgh). The paper's motto is Lux et Libertas – Light (referring to the Age of Enlightenment) and Freedom.

Editor Folkert Jensma was succeeded on 12 December 2006, by Birgit Donker. After a dispute with the new owners, Donker had to step down on 26 April 2010 and was replaced by Belgian Peter Vandermeersch. In 2019, he was succeeded by René Moerland.

On 7 March 2011, the paper changed its format from broadsheet to tabloid. The circulation of NRC Handelsblad in 2014 was 188,500 copies, putting it in 4th place among the national dailies.

In 2015 the NRC Media group was acquired by the Belgian company Mediahuis.

In 2022, when it stopped producing evening editions, the paper shortened its official name to NRC, by which it had already been known colloquially.

=== NRC Next ===
Between 2006 and 2021 Mediahuis also published nrc•next, a morning tabloid aimed at young people.

== Character ==
While it considers itself one of the Dutch national "quality" newspapers along with de Volkskrant and Trouw, NRC Handelsblad sees itself as the most internationally orientated of the three, and has been labeled left-liberal. It is popular among voters of the Democrats 66 and GroenLinks–PvdA

== Journalists ==
Journalists who work or have worked for NRC Handelsblad include: Henk Hofland, Hans van Mierlo, Marc Chavannes, Geert Mak, Karel van Wolferen, Jérôme Louis Heldring, Joris Luyendijk, Marjon van Royen, Derk Jan Eppink, Adriaan van Dis, Ben Knapen, and Paul Marijnis.

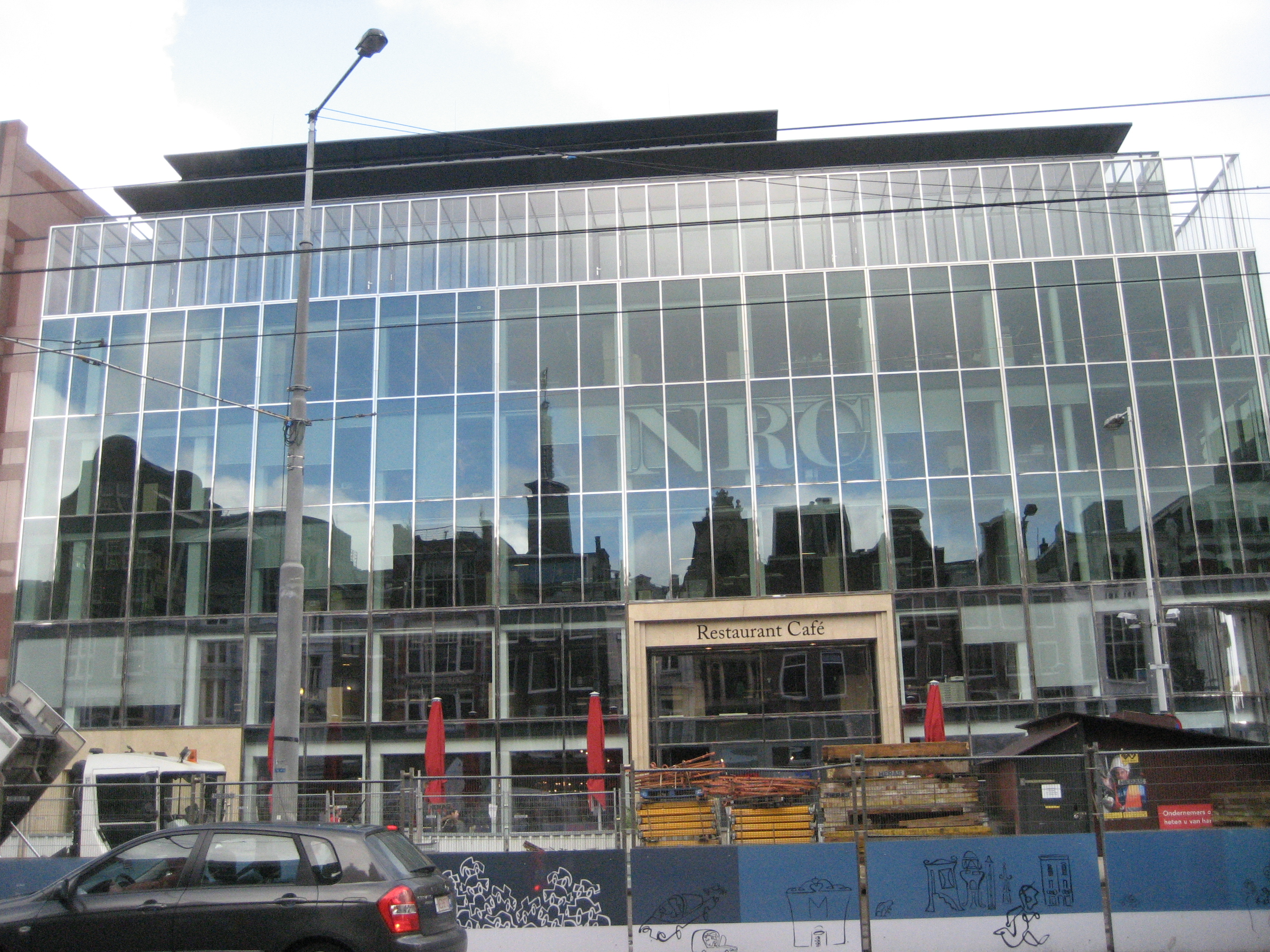
NRC (Rokin, Amsterdam)

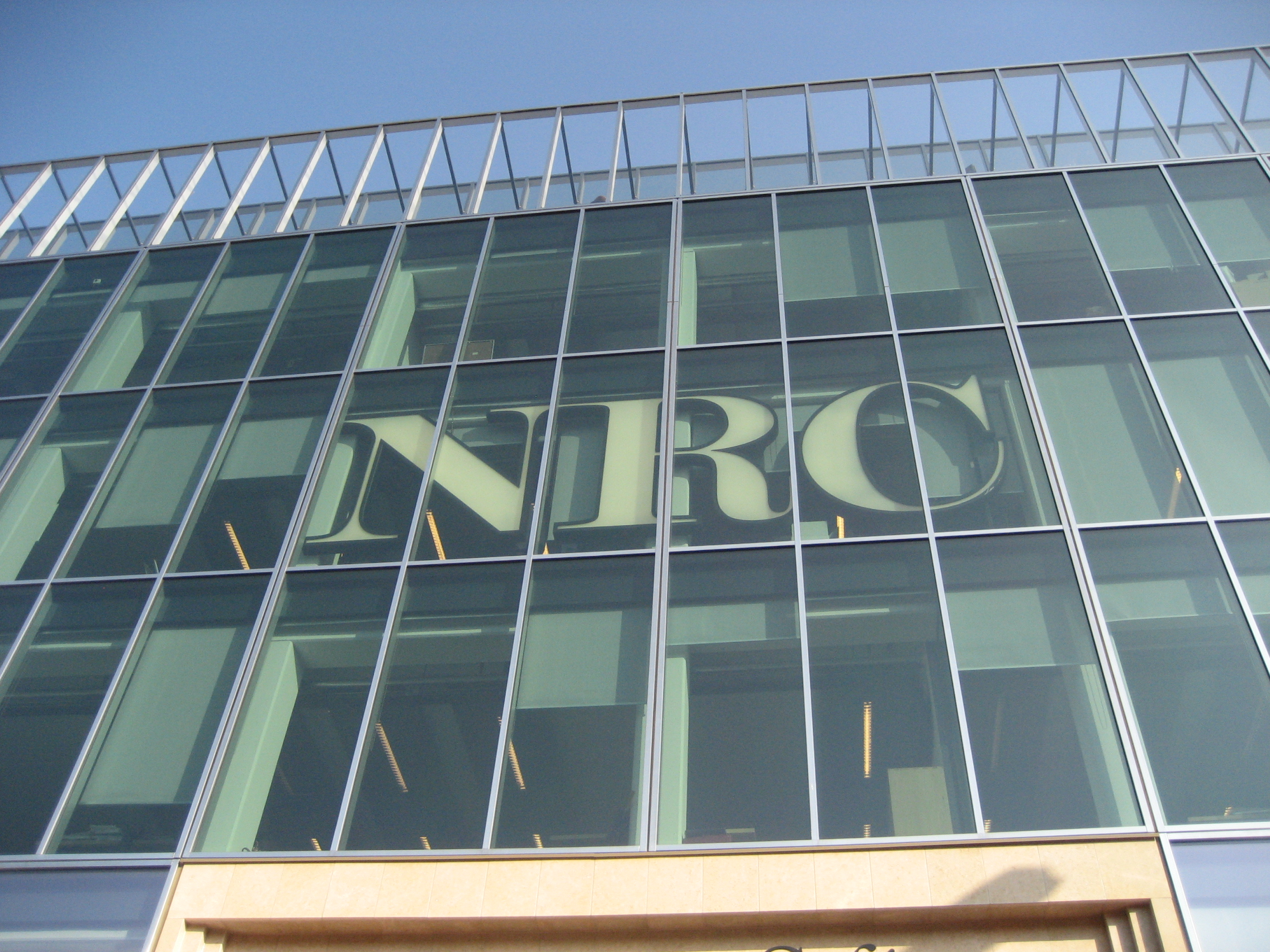

== Predecessors ==
=== Algemeen Handelsblad ===
Algemeen Handelsblad
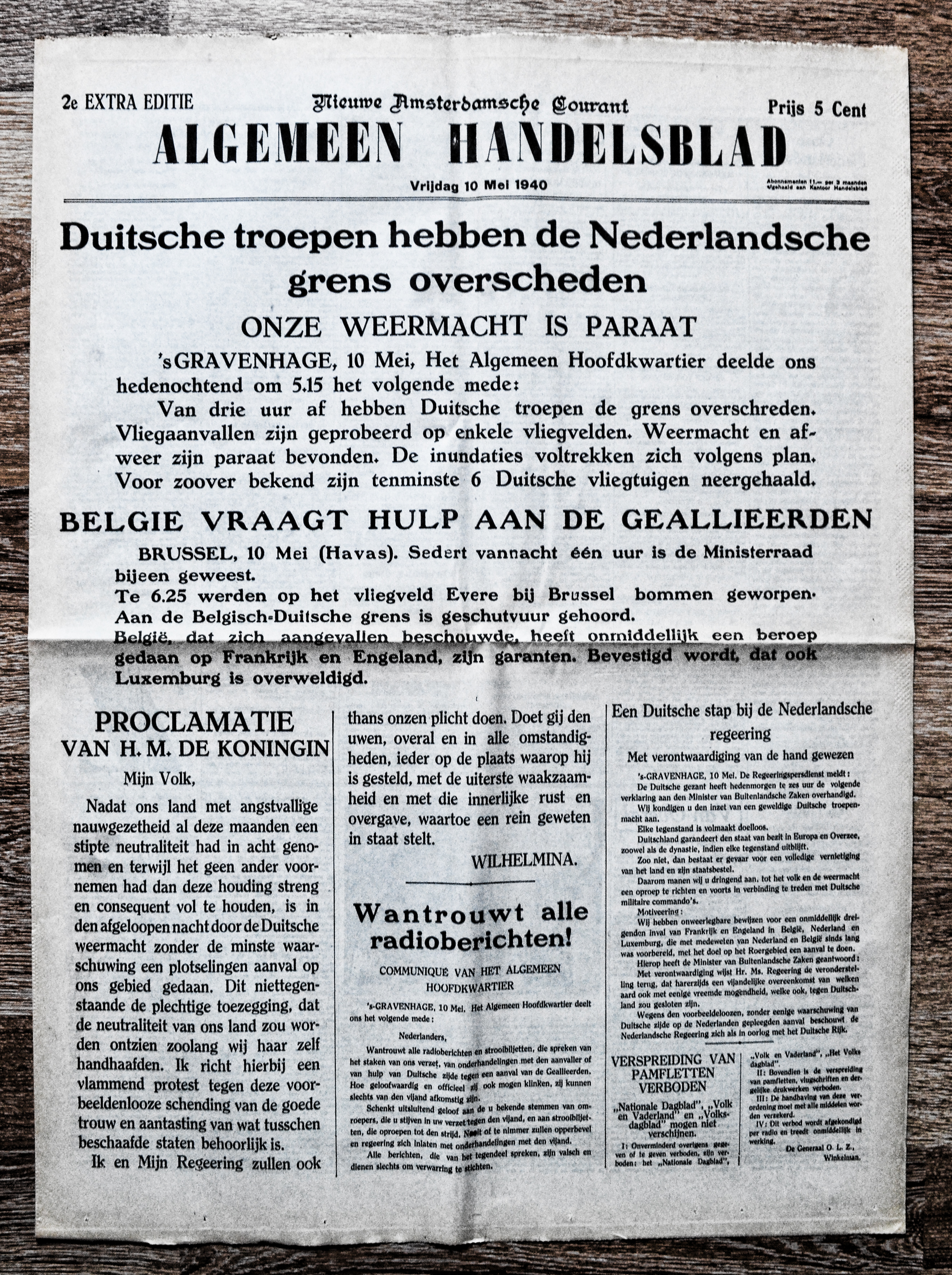
- Front page of Dutch daily newspaper Algemeen Handelsblad, 10 May 1940. Headline: "German troops have crossed the Dutch border"
- Type: Daily newspaper
- Owner: Nederlandse Dagbladunie (1962–1970)
- Founded: 1828
- Ceased publication: 1 October 1970
- Political alignment: Liberal
- Language: Dutch
- Headquarters: Amsterdam

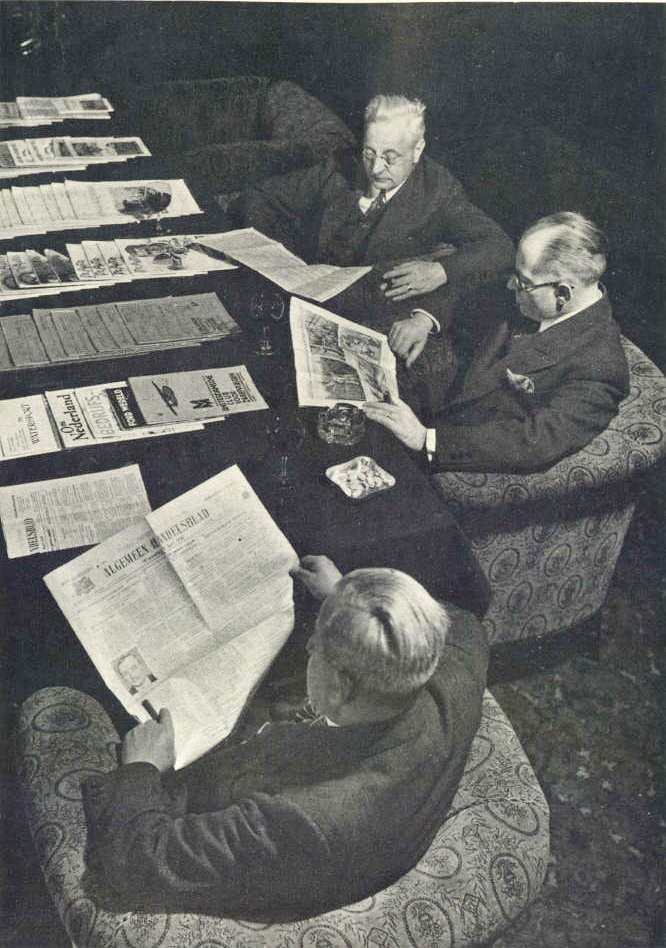
People reading Algemeen Handelsblad

The Algemeen Handelsblad was an influential Amsterdam-based liberal daily newspaper published between 1828 and 1970. It was founded in 1828 by J. W. van den Biesen, a stockbroker. The paper aimed at providing news about trade, share holding and banking. Later its coverage was expanded to cover political news.

At the peak of its influence—from the time of the Boer War, when it championed the Boer cause in South Africa, through World War I—it was edited by Charles Boissevain. The paper had a liberal stance.

Algemeen Handelsblad merged in 1970 with the Rotterdam-based liberal daily newspaper Nieuwe Rotterdamsche Courant into the NRC Handelsblad.

=== Nieuwe Rotterdamsche Courant ===
Nieuwe Rotterdamsche Courant
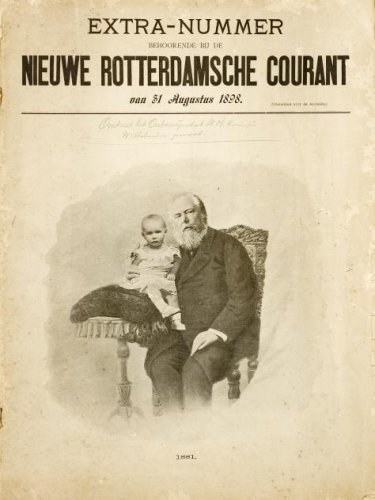
- Supplement 1898, with Princess Wilhelmina and her father
- Type: Daily newspaper
- Founded: 1844
- Ceased publication: 1970
- Political alignment: Liberal
- Language: Dutch
- Headquarters: Rotterdam

The Nieuwe Rotterdamsche Courant was an influential Rotterdam-based liberal daily newspaper published between 1844 and 1970. It was founded in 1844 by Henricus Nijgh. The paper merged in 1970 with the Algemeen Handelsblad to form the NRC Handelsblad.
