= Jérôme Louis Heldring =

Dutch journalist (1917–2013)

J. L. Heldring
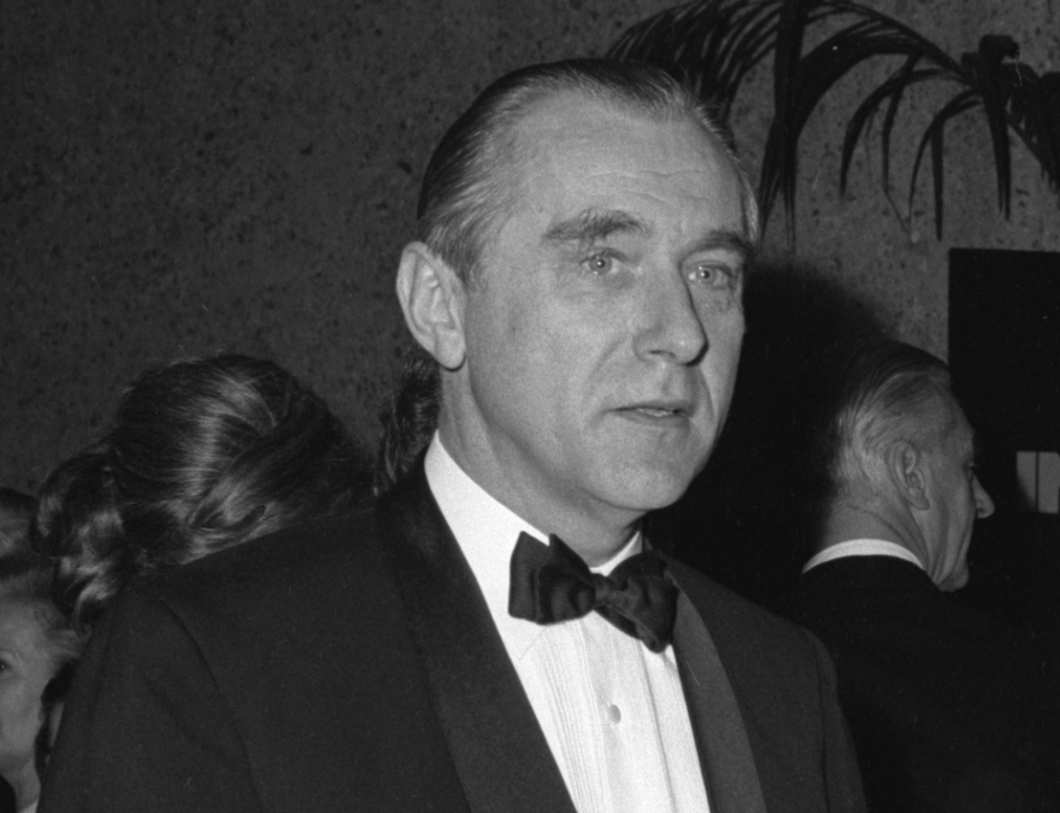
- J.L. Heldring, 1969
- Born: Jérôme Louis Heldring; 21 December 1917; Amsterdam, Netherlands
- Died: 27 April 2013 (aged 95); The Hague, Netherlands
- Occupations: Journalist, columnist

Jérôme Louis Heldring (Dutch pronunciation: [ʑeːˈroːm luˈʋi ˈɦɛldrɪŋ]; 21 December 1917 – 27 April 2013) was a Dutch journalist. He was columnist (1953–2012) and editor-in-chief (1968–1972) of the newspapers Nieuwe Rotterdamsche Courant and NRC Handelsblad.

== Biography ==
Jérôme Louis Heldring was born on 21 December 1917 in Amsterdam, Netherlands.

Heldring started to write columns in Nieuwe Rotterdamsche Courant (NRC) in 1953. From 1960 onwards, his column was called Dezer dagen (Our Days). In 1968, he became the editor-in-chief of the NRC, which merged with Algemeen Handelsblad in 1970 to form NRC Handelsblad. He stayed on as editor-in-chief until 1972.

He was one of the most influential political commentators in the Netherlands. His intellectual position was conservative and he was concerned with the history of civilization; his intellectual outlook was skeptical, detached, and precise.

He stopped writing his column for NRC Handelsblad on 5 April 2012, stating he did not have any more inspiration to write. He died a year later, on 27 April 2013 in The Hague.

== Bibliography ==
- 1964: Democratie in debat (Debating democracy)
- 1968: Spanning en ontspanning na Tsjechoslowakije (Entente and détente after Czechoslovakia)
- 1975: Het verschil met anderen (The difference with others)
- 1978: Ontspanning door Oostelijke en Westelijke bril (Détente, seen through Eastern and Western glasses)
- 1985: Geschiedenis na 1945 (History after 1945)
- 1986: Andermans veren. Uit de citatenverzameling van J.L. Heldring (Another person's feathers)
- 1989: Een dilettant (A dilettante)
- 1993: De taal op zichzelf is niets (Language by itself is nothing)
- 2003: Heel ons fundament kraakt, en andere kanttekeningen (Our whole foundation is cracking, and other annotations)
- 2013: Dezer dagen (These Days)
