= Jan Kal =

Dutch poet (born 1946)

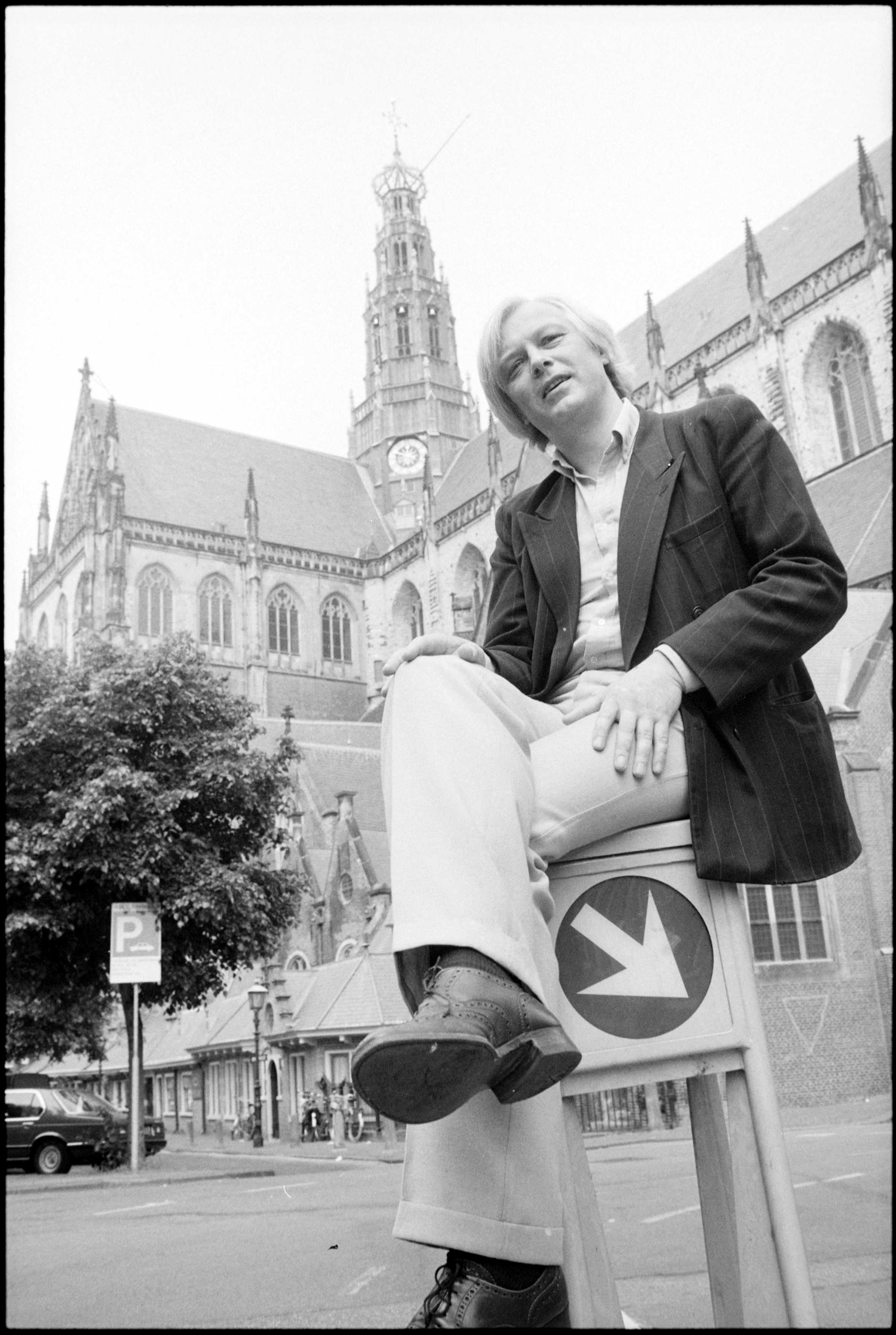
Jan Kal, 1988

Johannes Pieter "Jan" Kal (Dutch pronunciation: [jɑŋ ˈkɑl]; born 1946 in Haarlem) is a Dutch poet. He lives in Amsterdam. Along with others, such as Gerrit Komrij, Jan Kuijper, and Jean Pierre Rawie, he helped revive the sonnet in Dutch poetry, and substantially all of Kal's work is in sonnet form. His earliest published work is dated 1966, and his first volume of sonnets, Fietsen op de Mont Ventoux ("Cycling up Mont Ventoux") was published in 1974. His range of styles and subjects is wide, including love poetry, religious poems, and occasional poetry (notably celebrating sportsmen Ard Schenk, Joop Zoetemelk, and Johan Cruijff). His poetry tends to humorous irony as well as, at times, melancholy. To English-speaking readers who understand a little Dutch, perhaps his most accessible poems are his many sonnet versions of American popular songs, including those of Buddy Holly, Bob Dylan, and his favourite, Frank Sinatra.

In 2007, Kal appeared at the Crossing Border festival of literature and music in The Hague.

== Volumes of sonnets ==
There are no translations of Kal's poetry in English yet.

- Fietsen op de Mont Ventoux, 1974 (Cycling up Mont Ventoux)
- Praktijk hervat, 1978 (Practice resumed)
- December, 1979
- Waarom ik geen Neerlandistiek studeer, 1980 (Why I don't do Dutch studies)
- Assepoester (1981) (The Cinderella story retold in 39 sonnets, illustrated by Irene Wolfferts)
- Chinese sonnetten (1984)
- Amsterdam, Halfweg 1987, 1989 ("Halfweg" – meaning literally half way – is a railway station midway between Amsterdam and Haarlem)
- Mijn manier – 144 Sinatra-sonnetten (1990) (My Way. Dutch translations of Sinatra songs in sonnet form)
- 100 doortimmerde sonnetten uit 25 jaren, 1966-1990, 1991 (100 well-crafted sonnets)
- Oprechte Haarlemse sonnetten en tekeningen, 1992 (True Haarlem sonnets and drawings. The title is an allusion to a former Haarlem newspaper, the Oprechte Haerlemsche Courant)
- Het schrijvershuis, 1995 (The House of Writers)
- 1000 sonnetten, 1966-1996, 1997
- Laat ons leven en minnen, 2000 (Let us live and make love. Love poems translated from the Latin of Catullus)
- Hun zeggen, 2007 (They say in working-class Amsterdam Dutch)
- Een dichter in mijn voorgeslacht, 2015 (A poet among my forefathers)

== Sources ==
- Jan Kal at the Digital Library of Dutch Literature (in Dutch)
