= ROOD =

Socialist youth organisation in the Netherlands

ROOD, socialistische jongeren
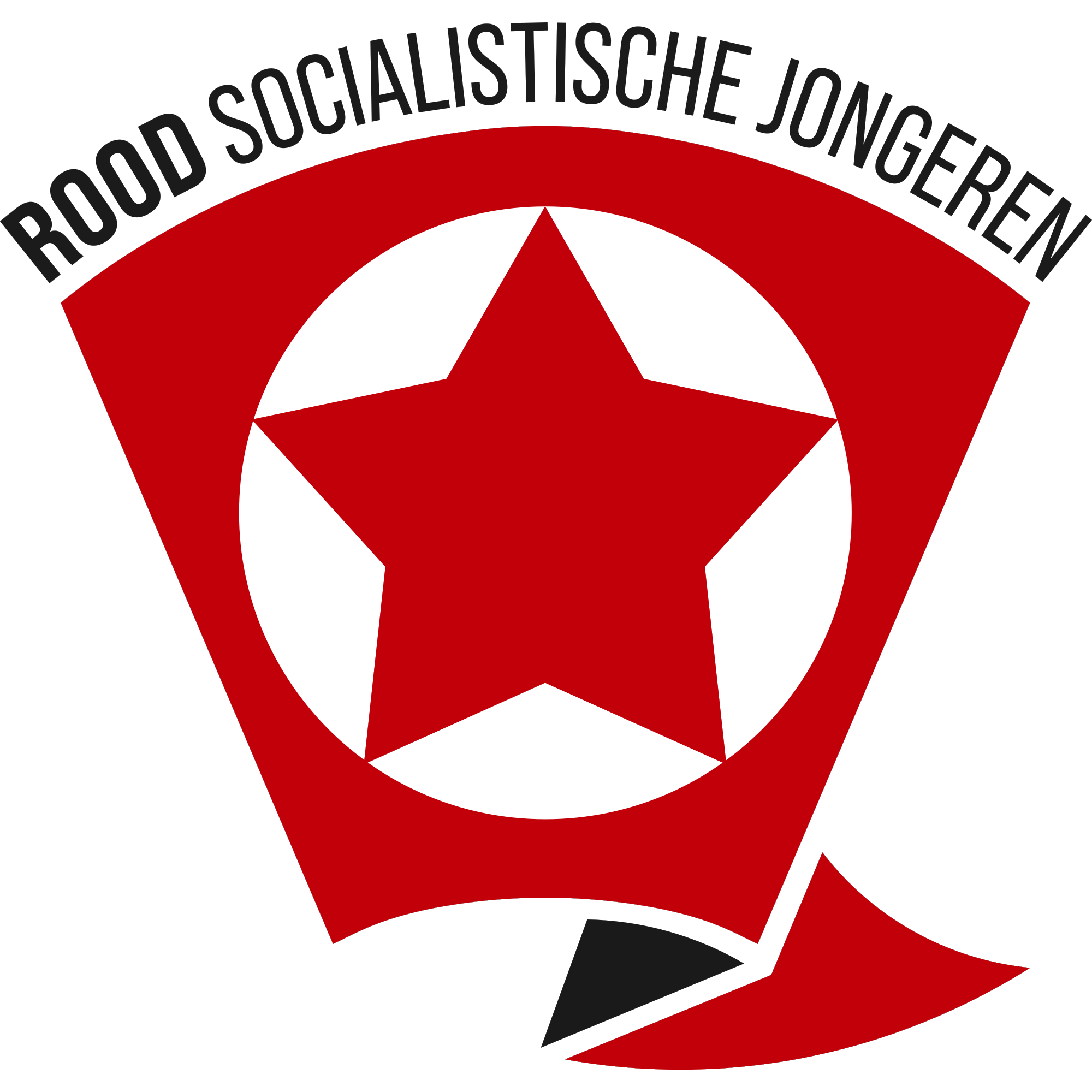
- Chairperson: Koen de Kootert
- Treasurer: Elise van der Doelen
- Founded: 20 June 2003
- Ideology: Socialism; Marxism; Dutch republicanism
- Mother party: Revolutionary Socialist Party (since 2023) (previously the Socialist Party, 2003–2021)
- Website: roodjongeren.nl

ROOD, socialistische jongeren (lit. 'RED, socialist youth'), also known as ROOD, is a Dutch revolutionary socialist youth organisation. It is the youth wing of the Revolutionary Socialist Party since 2023, and formerly of the Socialist Party, when it was still known as ROOD, jong in de SP (lit. 'RED, young in the SP').

== History ==
In the Socialist Party various groups had been active to attract young people to the party, one of these, known as J-team changed their name in 1999 to ROOD. Only in 2003 however ROOD became an official organisation.

From the very beginning ROOD was closely linked to the SP. The first chairperson of ROOD, Driek van Vugt became a member of the Dutch senate at age 18. For the municipal elections in 2006, 10% of the elected candidates were also a member of ROOD, and for the legislative elections in 2006, former chairperson Renske Leijten became a member of parliament for the SP.

In November 2020 the SP withdrew its funding from ROOD after multiple alleged instances of entryism. This included accusations of "infiltrated by communist radicals" and the youth organisation being accused of breaking party rules. Prior to this, the party had expelled a number of ROOD members who were accused of being members of Marxist Forum and/or Communist Platform, which the Socialist Party has stated are rival parties. ROOD was also publicly critical of statements made by the SP about forming a coalition with right wing parties, which further angered the party.

In June 2021, the party council of the SP decided to sever all ties with ROOD, meaning ROOD would no longer receive government subsidies. The SP subsequently announced that it would establish a new youth organization. In the coming months the Socialist Party expelled over 100 alleged members of ROOD from the SP.

After the rupture, ROOD has continued as an independent youth organisation. In 2021, they adopted a new programme stating that they are a revolutionary socialist organisation. In 2022, they were closely involved in the creation of a new revolutionary socialist party, then called The Socialists and now known as the Revolutionary Socialist Party (RSP). Ever since, ROOD represents the youth wing of the RSP.

== Organisation ==
Locally, ROOD is organised in groups. There exist criteria for forming a group, such as a minimum number of (active) members. The number of groups is continuously fluctuating, but was 20 on average in 2005. ROOD-members can be anyone between 14 and 28. They formerly had to be a member of the SP, except for members below 16 years of age.

The highest organ of ROOD is the national members assembly, who elects a seven-member board. Former board members include Olaf Kemerink, who was chair during the conflict with the SP, Lieke Smits who was elected chairperson in May 2012, Leon Botter, who was chairman between 2009 and 2012, former chair Eva Gerrebrands, Gijsbert Houtbeckers, who was chairperson since June 2007, Renske Leijten who held the position since June 2005, the first formal chairperson Driek van Vugt between 2003 and 2005. Notable members of ROOD before it became an official organisation are Sjoerd de Jong (1999–2000) and Gerrie Elfrink (2000–2002).

== Activities and stances ==
The main activities of ROOD are political activism and educating its members.

=== Campaigns ===
In 2003, ROOD was active protesting against the obligation for all citizens to be always able to identify themselves, and against cuts in education. There were also buildings occupied to attract attention to the lack of housing for young people and at various universities, actions were held for fair trade coffee at universities. ROOD also sent a representative to the European Social Forum (ESF) in Paris.

Since 2003, ROOD organises a yearly Huisjesmelker van het Jaar vote, where students vote for the worst private landlord in the country. Since 2005, this poll is organised in cooperation with the Landelijke Studenten Vakbond and local councils of that organisation.

In 2004, ROOD started a campaign against animal testing in the cosmetics industry, in 2005 L'Oréal were targeted to stop animal testing when ROOD visited delivered a signed petition to the company.

ROOD also campaigns on international themes such as globalisation. In 2005, ROOD facilitated an exposition by young Palestinians about their culture, in different Dutch cities. After a visit of ROOD members to the occupied areas in Palestine, a declaration of friendship was signed with the football club Hapoel Bnei Sakhnin, by ROOD referred to as "FC Bnei Sakhnin". In the Netherlands, ROOD started a supporters club for this Arab Israeli club. ROOD also participated in the successful campaign against the European Constitution with the slogan "Zeg je ja of denk je na" ("do you say yes, or do you think?").

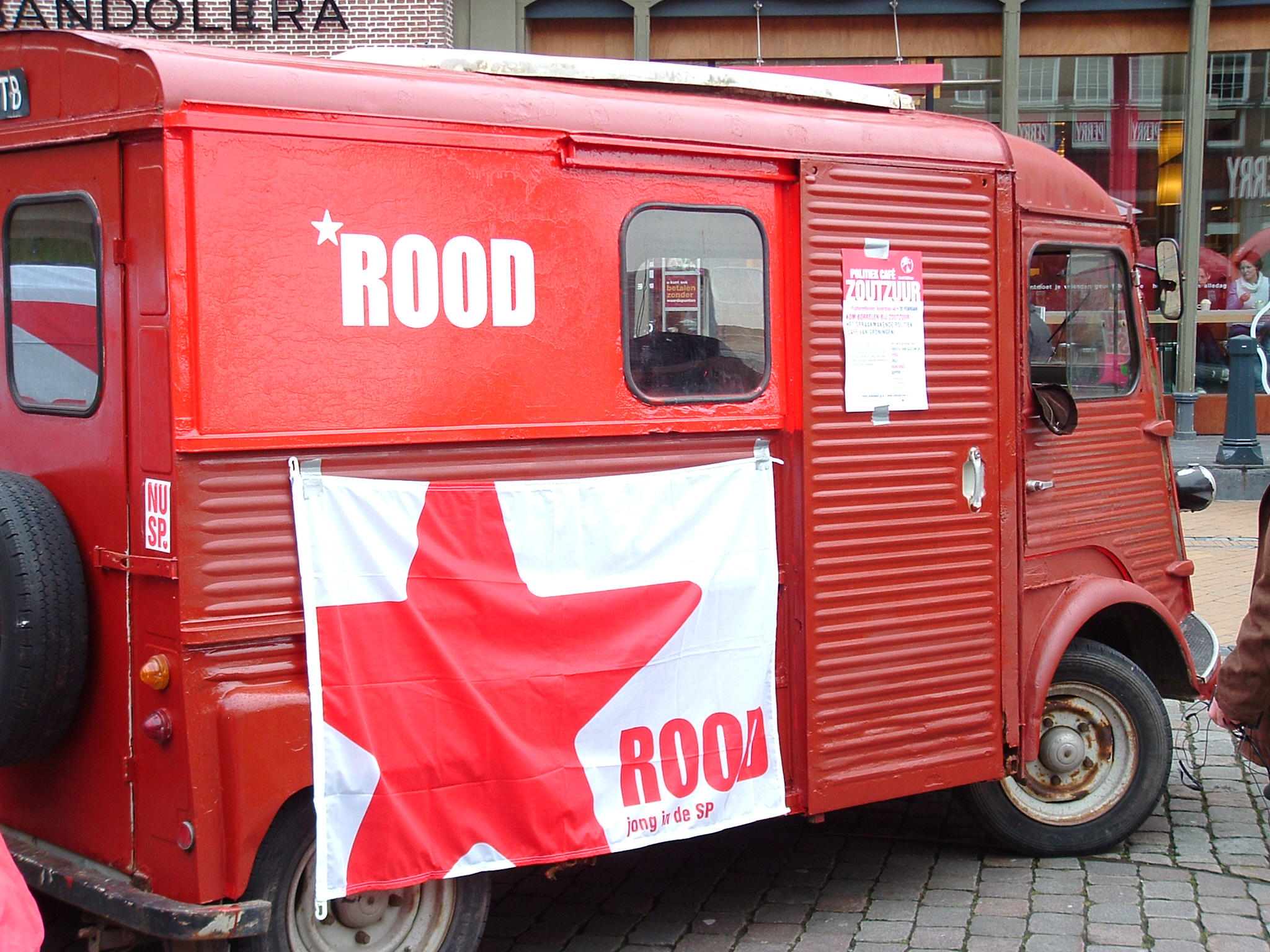
ROOD campaign van

In 2006 ROOD organised two electoral campaigns of its own, supporting the SP in the municipal elections and in the national elections.

Also in 2006, ROOD started the website www.watvooreikelszijnjullie.nl, a parody of the government website www.watvooreikelbenjij.nl, meant to teach values to young people. ROOD's stated reasons for the satirical site are that the government site represents a waste of public money (ca. 1 million euro for the campaign) and that the language used by the government site lacks respect (wat voor eikel ben jij can be translated as what kind of dick are you). ROOD also criticised the fact that this site was obviously linked to MSN, which means free publicity for Microsoft.

Since 2007, ROOD has been organising actions for the improvement of the education system. The main focus of these actions was against the '1040 hour norm' (a norm that forces schools to give an unrealistic high amount of lessons, creating a huge amount of 'free hours' for students). This 1040 norm caused a spontaneous all-out strike among secondary school students.

=== Publications ===
ROOD published two student newspapers:

- The Blikopener (eyeopener), for HBO and university students;
- The Code ROOD (code red), for all youths between the age of 14 and 28.

The Code ROOD appeared four times a year and contains political comments and news about activities by ROOD. The Blikopener appeared twice a year. They are distributed free of charge at schools, and in some places are distributed at homes in areas with many students.

Until 2006, ROOD had a monthly page in the party magazine, the Tribune.

Since 2006, ROOD was distributing the ROOD-magazine for its members. It is distributed twice a year and will contain in-depth political analysis for ROOD-members.
