= Netwerk =

Dutch television news program

Netwerk (Network) was a Dutch 'behind the news' television show on Nederland 2, aired between 1996 and 2010. It received in 2005 an International Emmy Award for the continuing news coverage Return to Beslan (as well as Albert Reinders and Margreet ter Woerds).

It protested against a proposed reform of the Publieke Omroep on 3 June 2005, concerning the rebrand of Nederland 1 into Nederland A, Nederland 2 into Nederland B and Nederland 3 into Nederland C, as well as a fall in advertising revenue.
