= Sonja Barend =

Dutch television personality (1940–2026)

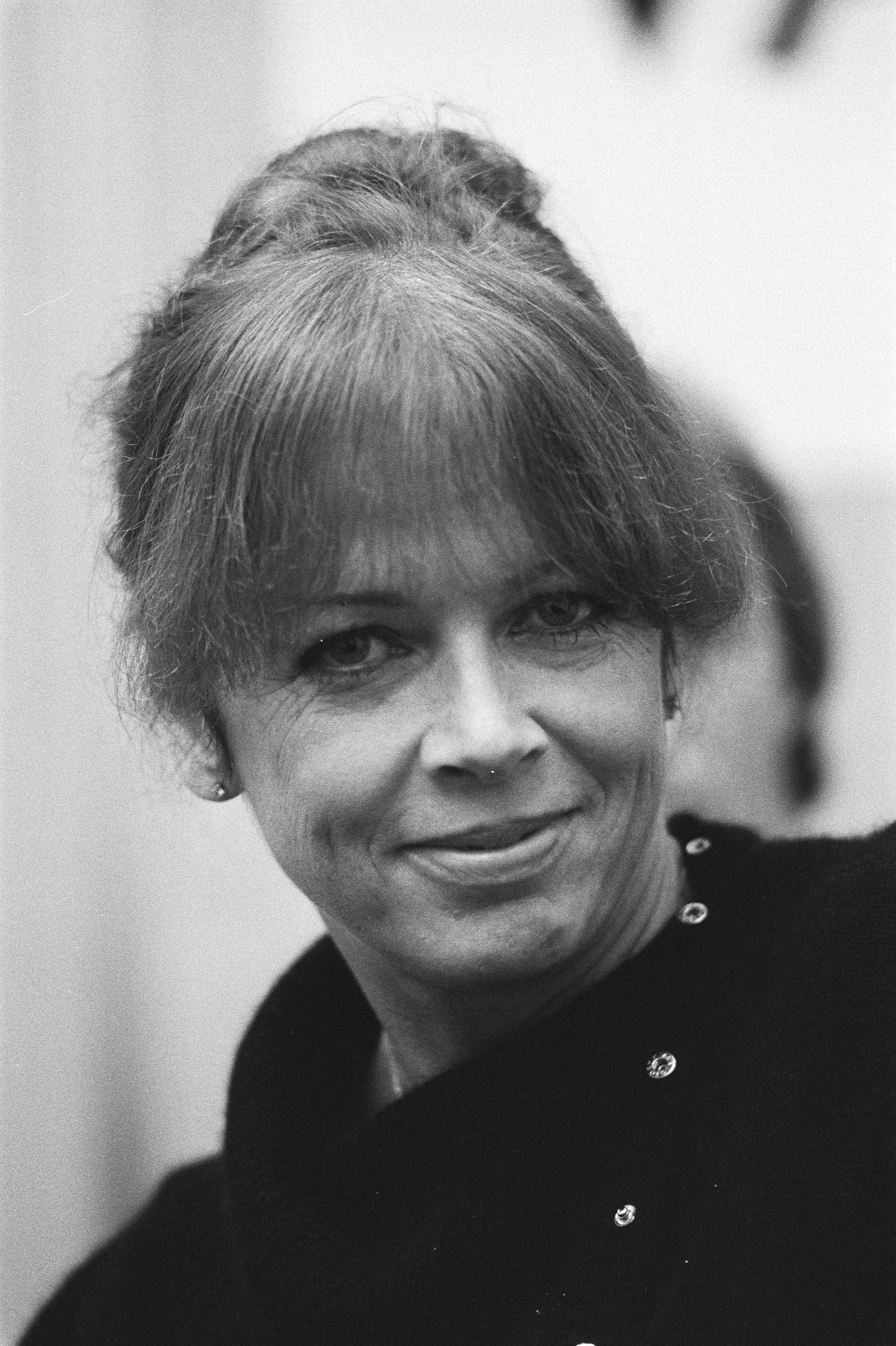
- Barend in 1983
- Born: 29 February 1940; Amsterdam, Netherlands
- Died: 11 April 2026 (aged 86); Amsterdam, Netherlands
- Occupation: Television talk show host

Sonja Maria Barend (29 February 1940 – 11 April 2026) was a Dutch television personality. She hosted one of the nation’s first talk shows, Sonja, in 1974–1975. From 1977, she developed her style and became the Dutch "talk show queen", attracting millions of viewers. She was noted for her combination of emotional warmth and sharp questioning – until then unheard of on Dutch tv. Her shows broke taboos and allowed ordinary people a voice in public dialog. She retired from television in 2006, after four decades of television making.

Barend worked for television from 1966. From the late 1970s on she presented her own weekly talk show for the VARA broadcasting organization, a show whose name was based on the day of transmission, e.g. Sonja op Maandag ("Sonja on Monday"). In 1996 Sonja op Zaterdag ("Saturday") came to an end, after the retirement of Ellen Blazer, her regular producer, with whom she collaborated from the beginning of her television career. Her show, which featured interview and public discussion, was known for allowing ordinary people to have their say. This included, for instance, the viewpoints of ethnic minorities, and relied to a great extent on Barend's personality and commitment.

She was outspoken on political and ideological topics, and television viewers either loved or hated her. Especially in the 1970s and 1980s she was never afraid to openly discuss taboo topics—homosexuality, feminism, emancipation, and sexuality. According to Marcel van Dam, chairman of the VARA from 1985 on to 1995, she personified the public's negative perception of the VARA (ill-tempered, moralistic), but he could not imagine how the VARA would have survived without her.

From 1997 until 2002 she and Paul Witteman had a daily news and talk program, B&W. She officially retired from making television in 2006, and on the occasion of her last Sonja show, was awarded as Officer of the Order of Orange-Nassau by Job Cohen, then-mayor of Amsterdam. That last episode, which included an overview of her career and a number of notable television personalities, received a subtitle, "En morgen gezond weer op!" ("And tomorrow, wake up healthy"), in reference to her usual closing of her TV shows. Gezond Weer Op is also the title of a collection of interviews culled from her shows. An annual award for best television interview is named after her.

Barend died on 11 April 2026, at the age of 86.
