= Nieuwsuur =

Dutch television news program

- Genre: News program; Current affairs
- Presented by: Mariëlle Tweebeeke; Jeroen Wollaars; Eelco Bosch van Rosenthal; Petra Grijzen
- Theme music composer: Martijn Schimmer
- Country of origin: Netherlands
- Original language: Dutch

Production
- News editor: Pieter Klein
- Production locations: Media Park, Hilversum
- Running time: 30–40 minutes (weekdays); 30 minutes (weekends)
- Production companies: Nederlandse Omroep Stichting; Omroep NTR

Original release
- Network: NPO 2
- Release: 6 September 2010 – present

Related
- NOVA (1992–2010); NOS Journaal

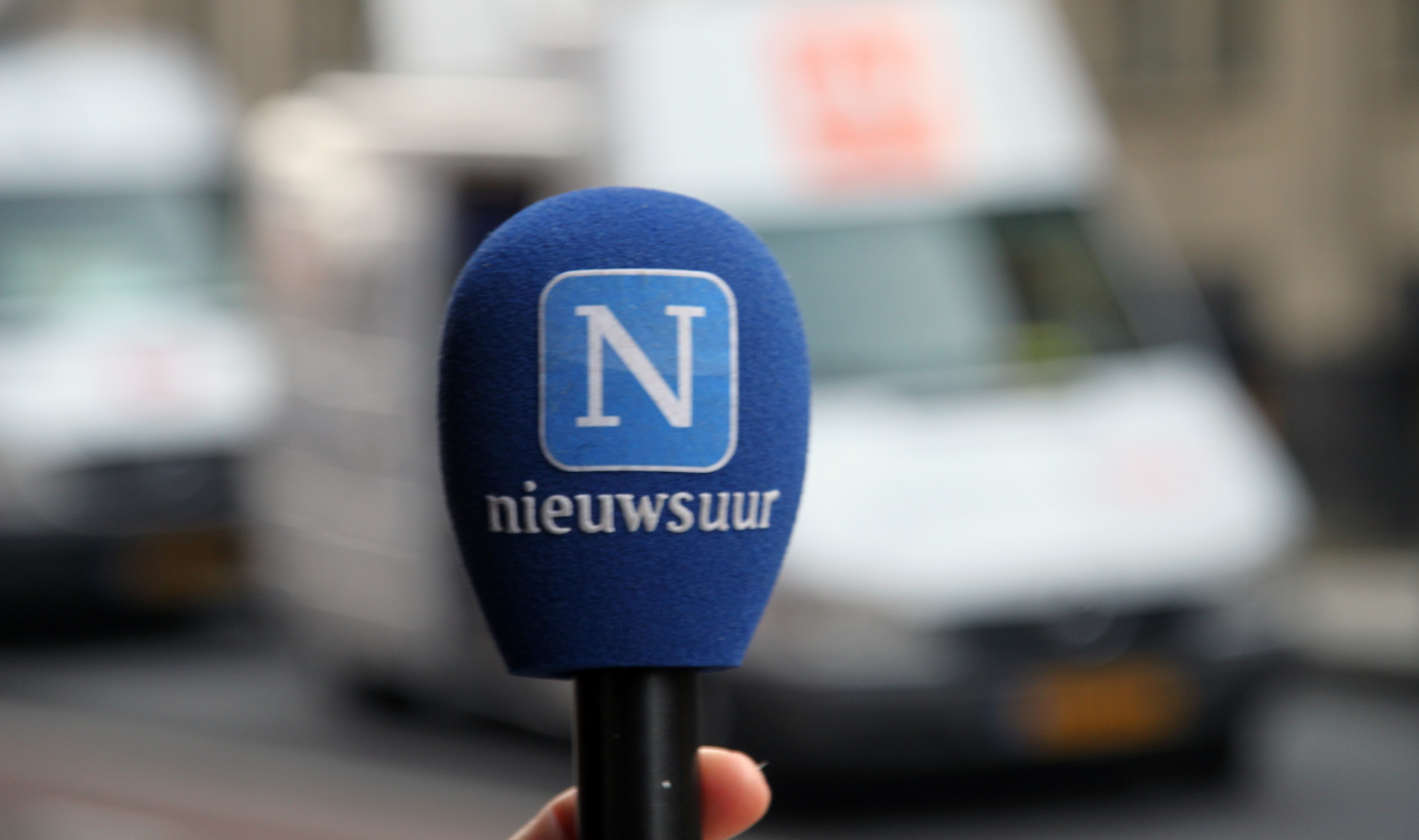
The Nieuwsuur logo on a reporter's microphone

Nieuwsuur ("News hour") is a Dutch current affairs television programme produced by the public broadcasters NOS and NTR for their umbrella organisation NPO. It is broadcast daily between 9:30 pm and 10:15 pm (9:30-10 pm at weekends) on NPO 2. The programme pays particular attention to Dutch and European politics and current affairs, as well as other international events.

== History ==
As early as 2008 there were plans for a new news programme, combining Nova, NOS Journaal, and Den Haag Vandaag (The Hague Today). The plan for this programme was rejected by the NPO's board of directors, following complaints from other broadcasters, as was the cooperation between the membership-based broadcaster VARA and the public broadcasters NPS and NOS. This was because the NPO did not want a member-based broadcaster such as the traditionally left-leaning VARA to be involved in an objective and independent news programme.

The Algemeen Dagblad reported in November 2009 that the NOS wished to cease production of Nova, as NOS management did not consider the programme to be objective or neutral enough. At the end of January 2010, it was announced that Nova and current affairs programme Netwerk would end at the start of autumn 2010, and that Nieuwsuur would replace NOVA from 6 September 2010.

== Presenters ==
=== Main presenters ===
Presenter	Years
Mariëlle Tweebeeke	2010–present
Jeroen Wollaars	2018–present
Eelco Bosch van Rosenthal	2016–present
Petra Grijzen	2019–present
Saïda Maggé	2018–2019
Joost Karhof	2010–2017
Twan Huys	2010–2018
