= EO Youth Day =

Annual event held in the Netherlands

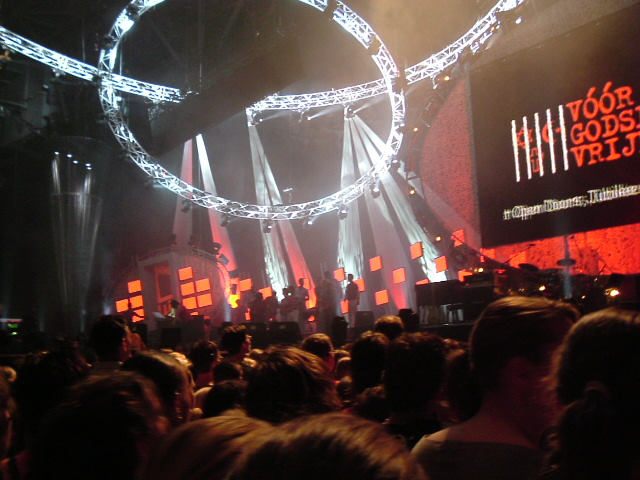
- EO Youth Day in 2004
- Genre: Christian
- Dates: Early summer
- Frequency: Once a year
- Locations: Groningen (1975); Arnhem (1976, 1998, 2002–2018); Hilversum (1977); Leiden (1978); Den Bosch (1979); Utrecht (1980–1997); Amsterdam (1999–2001); Rotterdam (2019, 2022–present)
- Country: Netherlands
- Years active: 1975-present
- Organizer: Evangelische Omroep
- Website: https://www.eo.nl/jongerendag

The EO Youth Day is an annual event in the Netherlands where young Christians from various churches sing concerts together, pray and listen to speeches. Christian artists from the Netherlands and abroad also perform. The event is organized by the Evangelische Omroep.

== History ==
The first EO Youth Day was held in 1975 in the Martinihal in Groningen. It was a regional event that attracted about 1,500 to 3,000 visitors. After four other small-scale youth days in Arnhem, Hilversum, Leiden and Den Bosch, it was decided to move to Jaarbeurs in Utrecht in 1980 to turn it into a national event. The number of participants grew strongly in the first years and so in 1982 about 20,000 people came to the event. When Jaarbeurs became too small for the number of participants, it was moved to the Galgenwaard Stadium, also in Utrecht, which could accommodate about 30,000 people.

In 1998 the location was moved again, this time to the newly completed stadium GelreDome in Arnhem, which is covered and can accommodate 35,000 people. For several years, the number of visitors averaged around 30,000 to 35,000 young people, most of whom were between 13 and 17 years old. Only in 1999 did the number of visitors rise to 50,000 young people, when the event was held for the first time in the Amsterdam ArenA on the occasion of the 25th anniversary of the Youth Day.

Television presenter Jan van den Bosch presented the EO Youth Day the longest. Evangelist TV presenter Henk Binnendijk was most often present for giving a sermon. In 1993, Bert van Leeuwen took over the role of presenter, who in turn handed it over to Frank van der Velde in 2004. In 2008, the presenter Manuel Venderbos succeeded him. Joram Kaat has been the presenter since 2015. After three years in Amsterdam, the event has been held again since 2002 in the smaller GelreDome in Arnhem. This led to a declining trend in the number of visitors. In 2008, for example, some 33,000 young people came to the Youth Day. In 2009, the Youth Day had a slightly different set-up: the program only started at 1 pm, instead of the usual time of 10 am. This is to give visitors from far away more time to travel to Arnhem. That year there was also more attention for workshops and other activities outside the main programme. In 2010, 32 thousand young people came, fewer visitors than in 2008 but more than in 2009, when there were more than thirty thousand. In 2011, more than 28,500 young people were present. In 2012, the number of visitors dropped even further to around 26,000 young people. In 2015, the number dropped to 25,000 and in 2016 to "almost" 23,000. Figures about the number of visitors in 2017 vary from 16,000 according to the municipality of Arnhem, 20,000 according to the EO itself and 23,000 according to the Reformatorisch Dagblad.

Yearly Number of Visitors

The number of visitors fell further in 2018 to 20,000 visitors. After the 2018 edition, the EO announced that the next edition would no longer take place in the Gelredome, but in Rotterdam Ahoy. On May 25, 2019, the EO Youth Day was held for the first time in Rotterdam Ahoy, which was filled with 15,000 visitors.

Politicians from Christian parties in particular are welcome guests at the EO Youth Days. Jan Peter Balkenende (CDA), Prime Minister of the Netherlands between 2002 and 2010, visited the EO Youth Day in 2005 and 2009. Former Christian Union leader André Rouvoet was present at the Youth Days of 2007, 2009 and 2011. In 2005, GroenLinks leader Femke Halsema was on present and in 2010, an Election Battle took place on Youth Day with 8 national party leaders. In 2011, Marja van Bijsterveldt (Minister of Education, Culture and Science) attended the EO Youth Day in addition to Rouvoet.

In 2012, the then 32-year-old Martin Brand should have been the speaker of the day, however, he was hospitalized after a cardiac arrest on June 3, 2012 (barely a week before the event). The former leader of the youth section of the EO, Wim Grandia, replaced him.

There was no EO Youth Day in 2020 and 2021 due to the coronavirus pandemic in the Netherlands. In 2023, during the 47th edition, there was about 15 thousand visitors.

== Criticism ==
There is also criticism of the Youth Day, especially from the reformed corner of the church in the Netherlands. During the Youth Day, the Christian faith would be presented too lightly in terms of content, supported by music styles (pop music styles) that are usually regarded as objectionable in conservative reformational circles. Nevertheless, a considerable part of the young people present at the Youth Day come from the reformed corner. A sample in 1998 indicated that this was 25%, in 2006 even 40% was mentioned.

== Incidents surrounding the EO Youth Day ==
The Evangelische Omroep apologized afterwards in 1998 after the broadcaster had sent a fax to the Netherlands national team to wish them luck during the World Cup in France. Part of the EO's supporters object to Sunday sports or the glorification of sports. Through chairman Arie van der Veer and then director Andries Knevel, the broadcaster said: "It is an unacceptable mixing between church and world. The EO takes the blame for all the concern, indignation and sadness."

The Young Socialists, the youth organization of the PvdA, filed a complaint with the Equal Treatment Commission in 2000 because it had not been given permission to be present at the information market around the stadium, while the youth organizations of the Christian political parties could be present. After a conversation with the Evangelische Omroep, the Young Socialists decided to withdraw their complaint.

In 2002 there was criticism from its own supporters because the Evangelische Omroep allowed a stall with information about homosexuality on the information market around the stadium. This stall was in line with EO's policy of striving for more openness on this subject. Criticism of the stall focused in particular on the fact that the organization that ran the stall did not rule out the possibility of a homosexual lifestyle. The EO therefore decided to set up its own stand with information from 2003 onwards. In the eighties there was already a riot around the EO Youth Day and homosexuality, when a group of gay activists disrupted the program by throwing paint. After a short break, however, the day went on as usual.
