= Pauw & Witteman =

Dutch late-night talk show

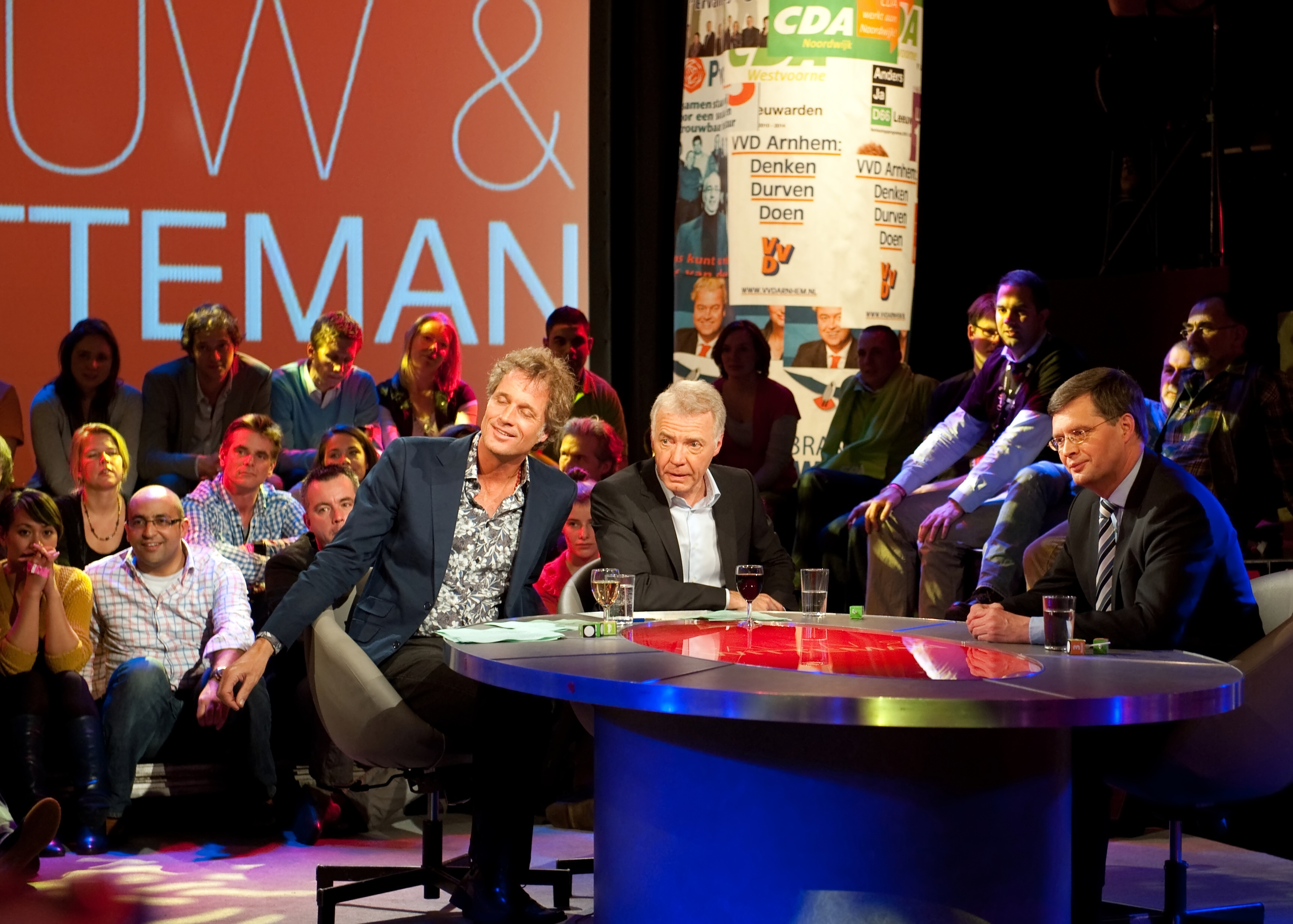
- Left to right: Jeroen Pauw, Paul Witteman and guest Jan-Peter Balkenende
- Genre: Talk show
- Presented by: Jeroen Pauw; Paul Witteman
- Opening theme: You don't know by Defunkt
- Country of origin: Netherlands
- Original language: Dutch

Production
- Producer: Joanne Oldenbeuving
- Production location: Studio Plantage
- Running time: 50 minutes
- Production companies: NPS (2006-2010), VARA (2006-2014)

Original release
- Network: Nederland 1
- Release: 4 September 2006 – 23 May 2014

Pauw & Witteman is a Dutch late-night talk show, hosted by Jeroen Pauw and Paul Witteman. It was generally focused on current affairs and politics. It was broadcast every weekday at 11 pm on Nederland 1. It was initially co-produced by Dutch public broadcasters NPS and VARA, and subsequently produced solely by VARA.

During summer (in July and August) Pauw & Witteman were replaced by Knevel & Van de Brink, a talk show hosted by Andries Knevel and Tijs van den Brink, produced by the Dutch evangelical broadcasting company EO.

== Notable episodes ==
- On January 11, 2008, crime reporter Peter R. de Vries challenged Joran van der Sloot on live television regarding his honesty of his involvement in the disappearance of Natalee Holloway. After the telecast of the show ended, studio and audience cameras recorded Van der Sloot throwing a glass of red wine into De Vries' face.
