= 5 jaar later =

Dutch television show

- Created by: Jeroen Pauw
- Presented by: Beau van Erven Dorens; Jeroen Pauw
- Country of origin: Netherlands
- Original language: Dutch

Original release
- Release: 22 December 2008 – 30 December 2016

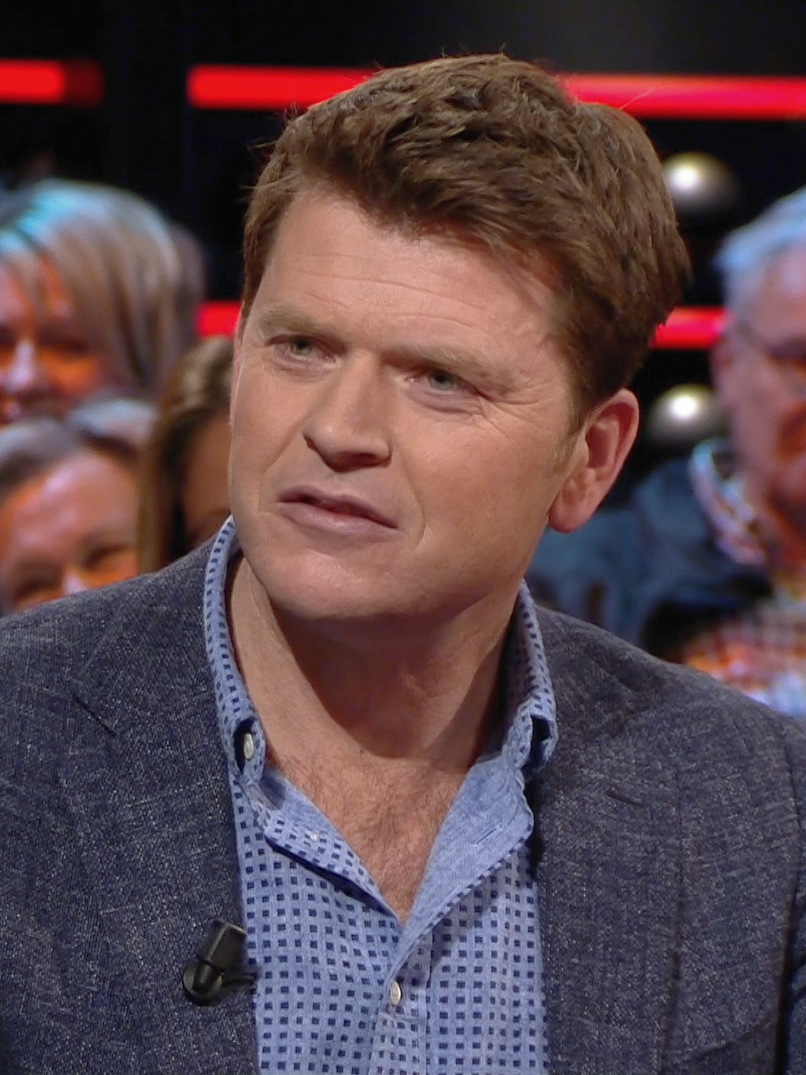
Beau van Erven Dorens (current presenter).

5 jaar later (Dutch for 5 years later) is a Dutch television show presented by Beau van Erven Dorens (previously by Jeroen Pauw). In each episode a well-known Dutch person's life is discussed based on an interview that was recorded five years earlier and kept in a vault for years.

In 2017, NPO decided to no longer broadcast the show and the show then moved to the RTL 4 channel owned by RTL Nederland. Beau van Erven Dorens also took over as presenter of the show. Jeroen Pauw himself was the first guest on the show after Beau van Erven Dorens took over as presenter. Pauw's interview was conducted by Daphne Bunskoek fifteen years earlier.

Pauw won both a TV-beeld award as well as the Sonja Barend Award for the show. The show is also Pauw's idea and owned by Pauw's company TVBV.

== Seasons ==
=== Season 1 ===
- Jan Marijnissen
- Katja Schuurman
- Frits Barend
- Reinout Oerlemans
- Frits Wester
- Bridget Maasland
- Mart Smeets
- Family of Theo van Gogh

=== Season 2 ===
- Jack Spijkerman
- Maurice de Hond
- Beau van Erven Dorens
- Paul de Leeuw
- Femke Halsema
- Joop van den Ende

=== Season 3 ===
- Gerd Leers
- Bernard Welten
- Ayaan Hirsi Ali
- Joost Eerdmans
- Hilbrand Nawijn
- Claudia de Breij

=== Season 4 ===
- Alexander Pechtold
- Chantal Janzen
- Henk Kamp
- Filemon Wesselink
- Sophie Hilbrand
- Jort Kelder
- Lange Frans

=== Season 5 ===
- Matthijs van Nieuwkerk
- Bram Moszkowicz
- Freek de Jonge
- Jörgen Raymann
- Ronald Plasterk
- Hero Brinkman

=== Season 6 ===
- Youp van 't Hek
- Jan Jaap van der Wal
- Fleur Agema
- Marco Borsato
- Thomas Dekker
- Peter Paul de Vries, Jeroen Smit and Willem Middelkoop

=== Season 7 ===
- Wilfred Genee
- Jolande Sap
- Ahmed Marcouch
- Wesley Sneijder
- Frans Bauer

=== Season 8 ===
- Gordon Heuckeroth
- Emile Roemer
- Jan Smit
- Adriaan van Dis
- Bert Koenders
- Sven Kramer

=== Season 9 ===
- Antoine Bodar
- Johan Derksen
- Jeroen van Koningsbrugge
- Heleen van Royen
- Diederik Samsom
- Ireen Wüst

=== Season 10 ===
- Jeroen Pauw
- Bram Moszkowicz
- Sacha de Boer
- Linda de Mol
- Jesse Klaver
- Susan Smit
- Epke Zonderland
- Hugo Borst
- Halina Reijn
