= Omroepvereniging VARA =

Former Dutch public broadcaster

VARA
- Type: Public broadcasting association
- Country: Netherlands
- Founded: 1 November 1925; 100 years ago
- Dissolved: 1 January 2014
- Former names: Vereeniging van Arbeiders Radio Amateurs
- Official website: omroep.vara.nl
- Replaced by: BNNVARA

Omroepvereniging VARA (pronounced [ˈɔmrupfəˌreːnəɣɪŋ ˈvaːraː]; lit. 'VARA Broadcasting Association') was a public broadcaster within the Dutch public broadcasting system. In 2014, VARA merged with fellow broadcaster BNN to form BNNVARA.

== History ==
=== Early history (1925–1940) ===
The association was founded on 1 November 1925 as the Vereeniging van Arbeiders Radio Amateurs (Note: The word vereeniging is an archaic spelling; today, this word is spelled vereniging.) (VARA; lit. 'Association of Workers' Radio Amateurs') and focused its programming and activities on the working class. Its main founders were Levinus van Looi, radio editor of the social democratic newspaper Het Volk, and Ger Zwertbroek, head of De Arbeiderspers. Van Looi became the first chairman of the VARA, and Zwertbroek the broadcasting secretary responsible for daily programming.

A villa in Hilversum was purchased for the broadcasts. In 1931, the villa was equipped with a radio studio, the very first in the Netherlands built specifically for radio purposes and fully paid for through a fundraising campaign by members of the VARA. The opening of the studio was attended by more than 100,000 VARA members. In the early years, the broadcaster only broadcast eight hours a week. Due to the relative amateurism of the time, it was given the nickname "Van Armoe Rammelt Alles" (Everything's Rattling Due To Poverty) by listeners of the AVRO in particular. One of the VARA's aims was to "stimulate interest in radiotelephony and radiotelegraphy among workers". To that end, the association issued construction kits that allowed members to assemble a simple radio receiver themselves, known as the Varadyne.

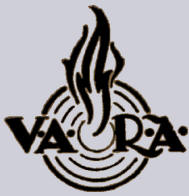
Original logo of VARA

=== World War II ===
During the German occupation of the Netherlands (from 15 May 1940 to 5 May 1945), the VARA, under the leadership of its chairman Arend de Vries, initially collaborated with the German occupying forces following a call by NSB leader Meinoud Rost van Tonningen. A radio address on 24 July 1940, in which De Vries explained the VARA's stance regarding the New Order, led to widespread protests and thousands of people cancelling their membership. It was argued that De Vries had failed in multiple ways: because the address had not first been submitted to the association council (which represented the membership), and substantively because of the speech's ambiguous phrasing. De Vries' initially accommodating attitude towards the German occupier was also motivated by van Tonningen's threat that the VARA would be dissolved as an institution if they did not cooperate. The association council unanimously approved the plan to continue working under restrictive conditions. These entailed that all programs had to be vetted in advance by the Rundfunkbetreuungsstelle and, on the orders of Reich Commissioner Arthur Seyss-Inquart, the appointment of Rost van Tonningen as commissioner of the SDAP and its related organisations, including the VARA. Only board member Jan Broeksz refused to cooperate with this and went on unpaid leave. Socialist leader and SDAP chairman Koos Vorrink harshly condemned the step as treasonous. The openly anti-Nazi publicist Johan Scheps also explicitly condemned the move in his brochures.

The VARA had a relatively large number of Jewish employees and board members, such as Meyer Sluyser (who managed to flee to England on May 15, 1940) and artists like Johnny and Jones, who often played a prominent role in VARA programming and who died in the Holocaust.

From the very beginning of the German invasion on May 10, 1940, the VARA lost members at a rapid pace: the broadcaster lost 50,000 of its 150,000 members in a single month. After De Vries' speech, the number dropped to 65,000 by the end of August. By the end of 1940, only 40,000 members remained. The major decline in membership numbers was due to the fact that people feared personal consequences due to their VARA membership and that, following De Vries' speech of July 24, they no longer saw a role for the VARA. In the week of March 2 to 8, 1941, the VARA, like the other broadcasting associations, was abolished in favour of the openly propagandistic and pro-Nazi Rijksradio-omroep.

Following its liquidation, all VARA assets were taken over by the state in perfect order upon formal recognition. All staff members, including the Jewish ones, were also transferred. A ban was imposed on listening to other stations, and finally, under penalty of deportation, the surrender of all radios in occupied Netherlands began in April 1943. In some cases, people replaced their large radio cabinets with clandestine smaller radio so that they could continue listening to stations banned by the Germans.

=== Pillarisation ===
During the era of pillarisation, VARA served as the broadcaster of the socialist and social-democratic pillar, maintaining close ties with the Social Democratic Workers' Party (SDAP) and its successor, the Labour Party (PvdA), as well as with the labour union movement – the NVV, and later, the FNV. Many purchased programs came from the leftist Lord Bernstein's Granada Television. Prominent party figures such as Jaap Burger, André Kloos and Marcel van Dam served as chairmen of the association. Until 1980, both the PvdA and the FNV were represented on VARA's governing board; since then, no formal institutional ties have existed.

=== Recent history ===
In 1957, the association adopted the official name Omroepvereniging VARA, at which point the name ceased to function as an acronym. On 7 March 2002, VARA adopted its final logo, consisting of a red cube bearing an exclamation mark.

In May 2011, VARA and BNN announced their intention to merge as part of the planned 2016 reorganisation of the Dutch public broadcasting system. The merger of the two broadcasting organisations took effect on 1 January 2014. Since 24 August 2017, both broadcasters have operated under the name BNNVARA, while the separate member associations of VARA and BNN continued to exist until 1 September 2018.

== Programming ==
Television programmes produced by VARA included:

- 2 voor 12 (1971–1981 and 1991–present), a quiz show hosted most recently by Astrid Joosten
- Kassa (1989–present)
- Kinderen geen bezwaar (2004–2013)
- Kinderen voor Kinderen (1980–present)
- Mike and Thomas Show (2005–2009), a panel game show
- Pauw & Witteman (2006–2014), a talk show, presented by Jeroen Pauw and Paul Witteman
- Sonja (1983–2006), a talk show hosted by Sonja Barend
- De Wereld Draait Door (2005–2020), a daily talk show, hosted by Matthijs van Nieuwkerk
- Various programmes with Paul de Leeuw
- Zeg 'ns Aaa (1981–1993), popular Dutch sitcom
- Alfred J. Kwak (1989–1991), an animated children's television series
- Pipo de Clown (1958–1964 and 1970–1980), a children's television series

On 5 June 1964, during the Beatles' world tour of that year, VARA organised and recorded a concert in the Treslong Café Restaurant in Hillegom as part of the band's three-day visit to the Netherlands. VARA broadcast a complete summary of the Beatles' visit to the country three days later, on 8 June 1964.
