= Conny Mus =

Dutch journalist (1950–2010)

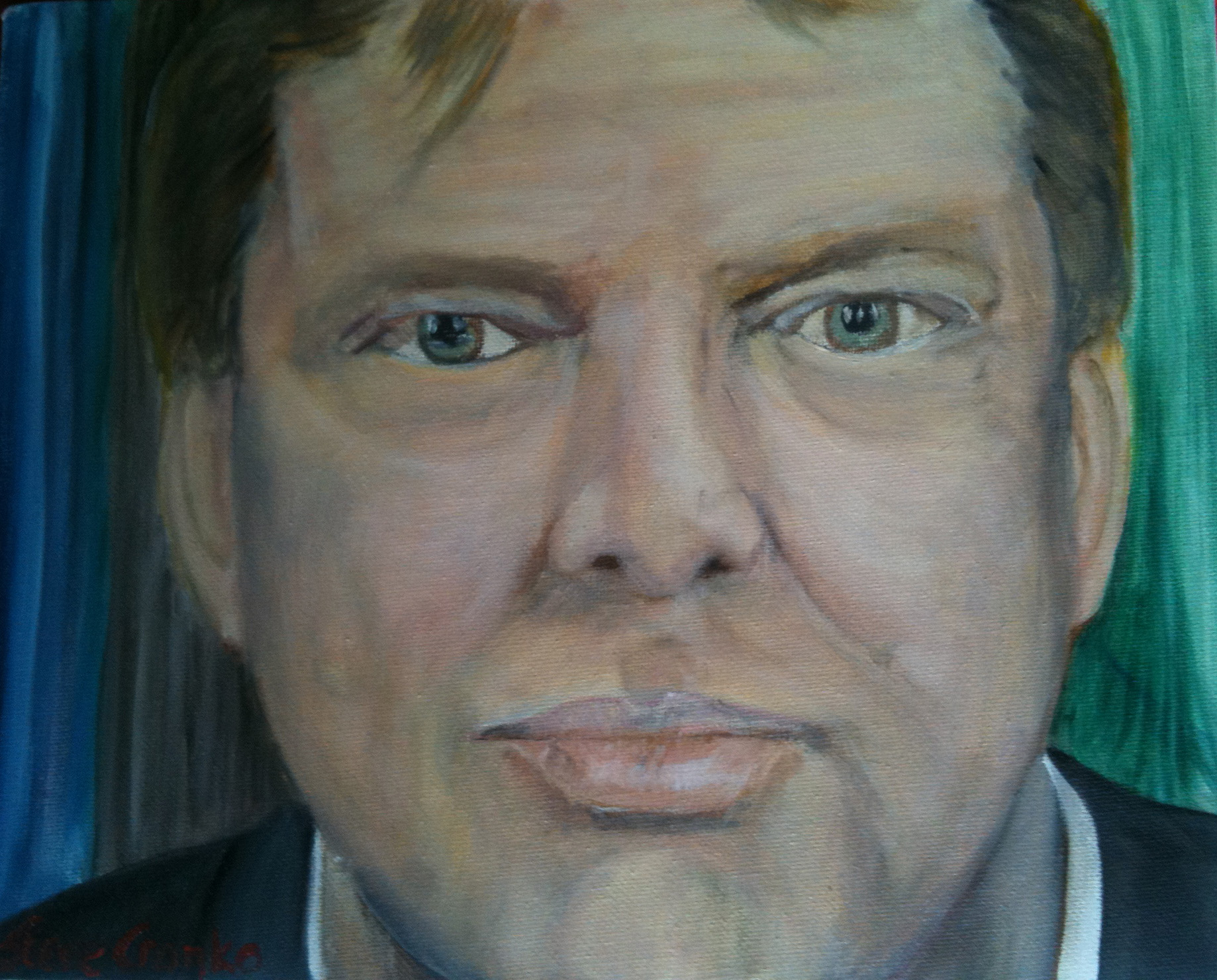
Portrait of Conny Mus.

Coenraad Willem "Conny" Mus (21 October 1950 – 20 August 2010) was a Dutch journalist, known as a correspondent for RTL Nieuws in Israel and the Middle East.

== Biography ==
Conny Mus was born in the Dutch capital of Amsterdam. After elementary school, he worked at an import/export company. At the age of 17, he traveled for the firm through countries like the former Yugoslavia and Romania. He wrote down all his experiences and sent them to regional newspapers in the Randstad.

In 1981 he moved to Jerusalem to start a company to import houseplants from the Netherlands. The company never got off the ground, but his stories became quite popular. He worked as a freelance journalist for Dutch television broadcast organisation EO, Flemish broadcast organisation BRTN, and Dutch newspaper Nederlands Dagblad.

In 1989 he became correspondent for RTL Nieuws on the Dutch commercial network station RTL Véronique (later RTL 4), stationed in Israel. For the news program, he made more than 1,300 reports. Mus mainly covered stories from the Middle East, including Palestine, Iraq, Jordan, and Egypt, but also from such countries as Cambodia, Cyprus, Kosovo, and South Africa. He also visited war zones for his reports, including the Gulf War, the Iraq War, and the 2006 War in Lebanon. In the Lebanon war, he escaped death three times.

He also made reports for the news program Het Nieuws on the Flemish commercial station vtm and for international news stations including the BBC and CNN.

In 1991, Mus was involved in the production of the song Shalom from Holland (written by Simon Hammelburg and Ron Klipstein) as a token of solidarity to the Israeli people, threatened by missiles from Iraq, during the first Gulf War.

Conny Mus died on 20 August 2010 of a cardiac arrest. At the time of death, he was visiting the Dutch city of Utrecht for a holiday.
