= Jack Spijkerman =

Dutch cabaret performer and presenter

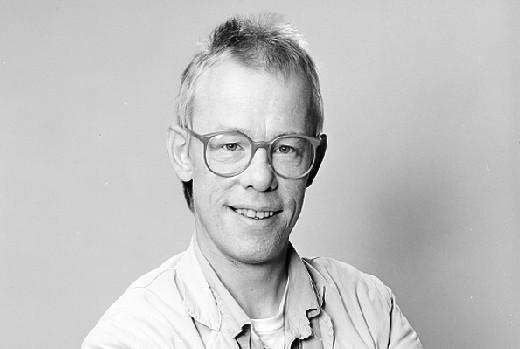
- Born: 8 October 1948 (age 77); IJmuiden, Netherlands
- Occupations: Radio presenter; Television presenter
- Known for: Kopspijkers

Jack Spijkerman (born 8 October 1948) is a Dutch cabaret performer, radio presenter and television presenter. He is known for presenting the satirical television show Kopspijkers which won the Gouden Televizier-Ring award in 2002.

== Career ==
Spijkerman is known as one of the presenters of the radio programme De Steen en Been Show which first aired in 1985. He also presented the radio programme Spijkers met koppen and the satirical television show Kopspijkers. The show Kopspijkers won the 2002 Gouden Televizier-Ring award. He also won the Zilveren Televizier-ster award himself in 2003.

Spijkerman moved from VARA to Talpa in 2005 and he presented the show Koppensnellers, a show similar to Kopspijkers, but less successful. In an interview he later stated that he should have created a new television show rather than a copy of a previous television format. His move from a public broadcaster to a commercial broadcaster was criticised as being motivated by money and has since been referred to as the Spijkerman-effect. In 2025, when Arjen Lubach moved from public broadcasting channel NPO 1 to the commercial channel RTL 4, Spijkerman appeared in a promotional video to help Lubach as coach.

Spijkerman became a presenter for RTL Nederland in 2009. He presented the game shows Wat vindt Nederland? and Echt Waar?!. He also presented the association football quiz show Koning Voetbal. Viggo Waas and Johnny de Mol were the team captains in the show. Spijkerman retired from television in 2016, after three decades of television making. He presented a single episode of the show Kopspijkers, titled DWDD Heimwee: Kopspijkers, in 2019. After his retirement, he became active doing work for the archives of association football club Ajax.

He was interviewed by Jeroen Pauw in a 2009 episode of the show 5 jaar later.

== Selected filmography ==
=== As presenter ===
- Kopspijkers
- Koppensnellers (2006 – 2007)
- Wat vindt Nederland?
- Echt Waar?!
- Koning Voetbal

=== As contestant ===
- De Jongens tegen de Meisjes (2014)

=== As himself ===
- 5 jaar later (2009)
