= Wie is de Mol? (Dutch TV series) season 10 =

Wie is de Mol?
- Season 10
- Presented by: Pieter Jan Hagens
- No. of days: 16
- No. of contestants: 10
- Winner: Frits Sissing
- Runner-up: Sanne Vogel
- Location: Japan
- The Mole: Kim Pieters
- No. of episodes: 10

Release
- Original network: AVRO
- Original release: January 7 – March 25, 2010

Season chronology
- ← Previous; Season 9: Northern Ireland & Jordan Next → Season 11: El Salvador & Nicaragua

The tenth season of the Dutch TV series Wie is de Mol? ("Who is the Mole?") aired in the winter of 2010. Pieter Jan Hagens returned to host for his third season, with guest appearances from former hosts, Angela Groothuizen and Karel van der Graaf. The season took place in Japan, marking the fourth time the series has filmed in Asia, after Bali in season 5, Thailand in season 7 and Jordan in season 9. The season premiered on January 7, 2010. The Reunion aired on March 25, 2010 where Frits Sissing was declared the winner of the season, earning a grand total of €21,950.-. Sissing was faster in completing the final test than his runner-up Sanne Vogel, to successfully unmasked Kim Pieters as the Mole of 2010.

== Format ==
Followed the same format as its Belgian predecessor, ten Dutch celebrities travel to Japan to complete Assignments to earn money for the group pot. However, one of the ten is the titular Mole, the one designated to sabotage the assignments and cause the group to earn the least amount of money for the winner's pot as possible. Every few days, players would take a 20-question multiple choice test about the identity of the Mole. Once the test is complete, the candidates await their results in an Execution ceremony. The candidate with the worst score is executed from the game, while in the event of the tie the candidate who completed their test the slowest is executed. The season plays out until there are three remaining candidates, where they must complete a final test (consisting of 40 questions). The candidate with the highest score, or had completed their test the fastest in a tie, is declared the winner and receives the group's pot.

The season had tributes to the past 9 seasons, including having the first two hosts of the program join the cast in Japan for an assignment, and the game beginning with instructions handed to the candidates by a famous past Mole at Schiphol.

== Candidates ==
A full list of the candidates and the host in on IMDb.

Name	Occupation	Day Exited	Result
Kim Pieters	Actress	16	The Mole
Frits Sissing	Television Presenter	16	Winner
Sanne Vogel	Actress	16	Runner-up
Erik van der Hoff	Television Producer and Presenter	14	3rd place
Arjen Lubach	Comedian	13	4th place
Hind Laroussie	Singer	9	5th place
Barbara Barend	Sports Journalist	7 (Note: Barbara was originally to be executed on Day 5, but was saved by her fellow candidates at that execution.)	6th place
Manuel Venderbos	Television Presenter	5	Withdrew
Tim Akkerman	Musician	3	8th place
Loretta Schrijver	Television Presenter	2	9th place
the result in grey indicates the Mole

== Candidates Progress ==
The order in which the candidates learned their results are indicated in the table below.

Summary of candidates progress in each episode
Candidate	1	2	3	4	5	6 (Note: The candidates could bypass their results at the expense of €1,000 from the pot each, if they wanted to secure their trip to Tokyo. Arjen refused the offer, and saw a Green Screen, ending the Execution ceremony with no one going home.)	7	8	Finale
Frits			1st	exempt		exempt	2nd	1st	Winner
Kim	2nd		3rd			exempt	1st		The Mole
Sanne			4th		1st	exempt	3rd	exempt	Runner-Up
Erik		1st	6th			exempt		Executed	
Arjen	1st	2nd	5th			1st	Executed		
Hind			2nd		Executed				
Barbara			exempt (Note: After Barbara informed that she would be executed from the game, the rest of the candidates had to decide whether to keep her or add money into the pot. The majority voted to keep her in the game, thus Barbara remained in the game.)	Executed					
Manuel			Withdrew (Note: Manuel fell ill during this episode and missed two assignments, as he wasn't recovering fast enough, he was sent home to recover.)						
Tim	3rd	Executed (Note: Tim had used a Joker on this test.)							
Loretta	Executed								

The candidate saw a Green Screen to proceeded to the next Episode.
The candidate used Jokers for this test, and saw a Green Screen to proceed to the next Episode.
The candidate used Jokers for this test, however, they did not see a Green Screen before the Executed player saw their Red Screen. Thus they proceeded to the next Episode.
The candidate did not see a Green Screen before the Executed player saw their Red Screen. Thus they proceeded to the next Episode.
The candidate received an Exemption to automatically proceed to the next Episode.
The candidate was executed from the game and sent home.
The candidate had to withdraw from the game due to falling ill and missing too many assignments.

== Episodes ==
For more information, see: List of seasons of "Wie is de Mol?"

Episode	Air Date	Amount in Pot (Note: Pot earnings: indicates an increase indicates no change indicates a decrease)	Location	Days	Eliminated	References
1	January 7, 2010	€0 → €3,000	Nagasaki, Nagasaki	1—2	Loretta	
2	January 14, 2010	€3,000 → €5,500	Nagasaki, Nagasaki	2—3	Tim	
3	January 21, 2010	€5,500	Nagasaki, Nagasaki	3—5	~~Barbara~~ (Note: Barbara was to be executed from the game, but saved by her fellow candidates in a majority vote to receive an Exemption to stay.)	
3	January 21, 2010	€5,500	Nagasaki, Nagasaki	3—5	Manuel (Note: Manuel withdrew from the game due to an illness.)	
4	January 28, 2010	€5,500 → €8,300	Nagasaki, Nagasaki → Sendai, Miyagi	5—7	Barbara	
5	February 4, 2010	€8,300 → €12,900	Sendai, Miyagi → Yamagata, Yamagata	8—9	Hind	
6	February 11, 2010	€12,900 → €11,400	Yamagata, Yamagata	10—11	—N/a (Note: Four of the candidates removed €1,000 from the pot each to skip the Execution. Arjen was the only candidate to refuse the offer and received a Green Screen, thus no-one was executed this episode.)	
7	March 4, 2010	€11,400	Yamagata, Yamagata → Tokyo	12—13	Arjen	
8	March 11, 2010	€11,400 → €13,900	Tokyo	13—14	Erik	
9	March 18, 2010	€13,900 → €18,950	Tokyo	15—16	—N/a (Note: No one got eliminated because it was the finale.)	
10	March 25, 2010	€18,950 → €21,950	Lisse, Netherlands	Runner-up	Sanne	
10	March 25, 2010	€18,950 → €21,950	Lisse, Netherlands	Winner	Frits	
10	March 25, 2010	€18,950 → €21,950	Lisse, Netherlands	The Mole	Kim	

== Season summary ==
=== Episode 1 ===
Episode 1
Original airdates: 7 January 2010 Locations: Nagasaki, Nagasaki
Assignment	Money earned	Possible earnings
Megami Ohashi Bridge	€1,000.-	€8,000.-
Symbolic Pairs	€2,000.-	€2,000.-
Current Pot	€3,000.-	€10,000.-
Execution
Loretta	1st player executed	

Megami Ohashi Bridge - Max. €8,000.-

Four candidates were placed on top of pillars on the Megami Ohashi Bridge in Nagasaki. Another four candidates were placed on a boat in the river, and must try to identify which candidate is on which pillar and raise color flags to indicate their findings to the last remaining two candidates in a helicopter. The two helicopter candidates must correctly translate the boat's codes to open four locked chests on the Helipad. Opening each chest added €1,000 to the pot. If all four chests were opened, an additional €4,000.- would be added to the pot.

The group only managed to open one chest and add €1,000 to the pot.

Symbolic Pairs - Max. €2,000.-

Eight candidates were tasked to purchase items in a local neighborhood in Nagasaki that easily represented them. In two pairs of duos, they must walk along a canal with 8 photographs and correctly pair the photographs with the correct item. Replacing the stand-in photo of the candidate for one of their own if they felt it was incorrect. The last two candidates then had to confirm the matches, being allowed to make two changes in total. For every correct match, €250 would be added to the pot.

Loretta and Manuel successfully matched all the items with the remaining candidates, adding €2,000 to the pot.

=== Episode 2 ===
Episode 2
Original airdates: 14 January 2010 Locations: Nagasaki, Nagasaki
Assignment	Money earned	Possible earnings
Nagasaki Tram Hunt	€2,500.-	€2,500.-
Yakuza Village	€0.-	€3,000.-
In Jokers We Trust	N/A	N/A
Current Pot	€5,500.-	€15,500.-
Jokers
Arjen, Barbara, Erik, Frits, Hind, Kim, & Sanne	In Jokers we Trust	
Execution
Tim	2nd player executed	

Nagasaki Tram Hunt - Max. €2,500.-

In three teams, the candidates must take a Tram line to three stops. At each stop, a team must step out and search for two tubes in that area, without opening them before returning to the tram. All the tubes were hidden in locations connected to Dutch history with Japan in the city. The teams had to arrive at the location Pieter Jan was awaiting for them within 1 hour. On the tram, a laptop awaited the candidates, where they could chat to Pieter Jan using the clues inside their tubes. The clues eventually would lead the candidates to finish location, a Dutch statue donated to Japan in memory of the two countries' shared history.

The group arrived in time and added €2,500 to the pot.

Yakuza Village - Max. €3,000.-

Blindfolded and taken to a Dutch Village near Nagasaki, the candidates were tasked to find money hidden in the village. Two at a time, or by themselves they could explore the village, while avoiding men in suits. Throughout the village are buttons that reveal maps for the candidates in the safe house to direct the explorers. The candidates have an hour to retrieve the money and avoid being shot by the men outside to succeed in the assignment.

All the candidates were caught by men in black suits, failing the assignment.

In Jokers We Trust

In the Dutch village, the candidates were tasked to form pairs that trusted each other. Each pair were split into two groups, with the lone candidate joining one group. Pieter Jan would offer an increasing amount of Jokers to each group, where the candidates could only take once, with Pieter Jan deciding if more than one candidate attempts to claim Jokers at the same time. Whatever a candidate claims, belongs to their partner.

After both groups have claimed jokers. They had to negotiate with their partners to trade their Jokers or not. Immediately after the assignment, the candidates partook in the test where their partner got to witness them writing the test and possibly play their Jokers.

=== Episode 3 ===
Episode 3
Original airdates: 21 January 2010 Locations: Nagasaki, Nagasaki
Assignment	Money earned	Possible earnings
Japanese Driving Exam	€0.-	N/A
Dinner with Guests	TBA	€3,000.-
Save or Send Home	€0.-	€2,000.-
Current Pot	€5,500.-	€20,500.-
Exemption
Barbara (Note: If Barbara had not been saved by the group, she would have been the executed player in this episode.)	Save or Send Home	
Execution
Manuel	Withdrew (Note: Manuel had fallen ill and missed two assignments. He was deemed too far behind to continue with the game, and was sent home to recover.)	

Japanese Driving Exam

The candidates were taken to a Test Driving Facility to pass a Japanese Driving Exam. Four drivers, and three instructors. The rules were that the drivers had to finish where they had started, drive through every route only once all within half an hour. The three instructors had to communicate over radio phones with instructions to routes with money on them.

Official driving instructors accompanied the drivers throughout the assignment to inspect their driving. The candidates committed several faults, however, they had all driven over the same part of routes multiple times, breaking the rules and failing the assignment automatically.

Dining with Guests - Max. €3,000.-

Invited to a luxurious lunch, the candidates were joined with former hosts, Angela Groothuizen and Karel van de Graaf. One by one, the candidates were escorted to a side room during the lunch to be informed of their assignment: To convince Groothuizen and Van de Graaf to point to them as the Mole at the end of the lunch.

If Groothuizen and Van de Graaf had successfully pointed out the Mole, the group would lose €3,000 from the pot. If they had failed, the group would earn €3,000 for the pot. The result would become known if the chosen candidate is executed or revealed to be the Mole at the end of the season.

Save or Send Home - Max. €2,000.-

At the Execution, it was revealed that Barbara was potentially the executed candidate. However, the group were informed that they could earn more money before the ceremony had ended. One by one, the safe candidates had to decide if they were giving her a green topito or red, hiding the topitos under bowls for Barbara to pick. If Barbara successfully found 4 green topitos, it would form an exemption to save her. If not, €2,000 would be added to the pot, and she would be sent home.

The candidates all decided to keep Barbara, forgoing the €2,000 for the pot.

=== Episode 4 ===
Episode 4
Original airdates: 28 January 2010 Locations: Nagasaki, Nagasaki → Sendai, Miyagi
Assignment	Money earned	Possible earnings
High School Examination	€0.-	€2,500.-
Sandbag Meeting	€1,200.-	€4,000.-
Chain Gang	€1,600.-	€3,200.-
Current Pot	€8,300.-	€30,200.-
Exemption
Frits	Chain Gang	
Execution
Barbara	3rd player executed	

High School Examination - Max. €2,500.-

Divided into three teams, two duos, and a trio of those with the lowest grades in school; the candidates are given 10 tasks worth €250 each to complete in 20 minutes. Each team has 5 minutes to provide Pieter Jan an answer for the classroom that they have entered. If they are incorrect, one candidate in the team must remain in the room while the rest carry on. Any candidates who have answered correctly may return to Pieter Jan to cash in on their earnings, however, if no candidates arrive within the time limit, the assignment is failed.

None of the candidates returned to Pieter Jan in time, failing the assignment despite answering two questions correctly.

Sandbag Meeting - Max. €4,000.-

Upon arriving in Sendai, the candidates were divided into two groups and placed on opposite ends of a trail. The groups earn money for the pot depending on how many sandbags they manage to carry, and where they meet in the middle of the trail within an hour and a half time limit.

The group managed to meet with 28 bags, at the €3,000.- meeting point, earning - Max. €1,200 out of a total €4,000 for the pot.

Chain Gang - Max. €3,200.-

Before starting dinner while camping in Sendai, the candidates were chained together in the woods. In the middle of the group stood a trap that held a master key and an Exemption. Each candidate that chooses to free themselves with the key, adds an increasing amount of money into the pot. Meanwhile, if a candidate chooses the Exemption, the assignment is over with everyone including the Exempt candidate still chained together will spend the rest of the night outside. The trap opens every 15 minutes. If every candidate freed themselves they would earn €3,200 for the pot.

All the candidates chose to free themselves, except for Frits who remained last and took the Exemption for himself, adding €1,600 for the pot.

=== Episode 10 - Reunion ===
Notes

== Reception ==
For more information, see: List of seasons of "Wie is de Mol?"

=== Viewing Figures ===
Viewing Figures
#	Air Date	Time Slot	Viewers
1	January 7, 2010	20.30 CET	1,912,000
2	January 14, 2010	20.30 CET	1,637,000
3	January 21, 2010	22.10 CET	1,373,000
4	January 28, 2010	20.30 CET	1,706,000
5	February 4, 2010	20.30 CET	1,574,000
6	February 11, 2010	20.30 CET	1,698,000
7	March 4, 2010	20.30 CET	1,348,000
8	March 11, 2010	20.30 CET	1,366,000
9	March 18, 2010	20.30 CET	1,544,000
10	March 25, 2010	20.30 CET	1,460,000

=== Awards and nominations ===
For more information, see: Gouden Televizier-Ring Gala

Year	Category	Result
2010	Gouden Televizier-Ring (Golden Television Ring)	Nominated
