= Paul de Leeuw =

Dutch comedian, singer and actor

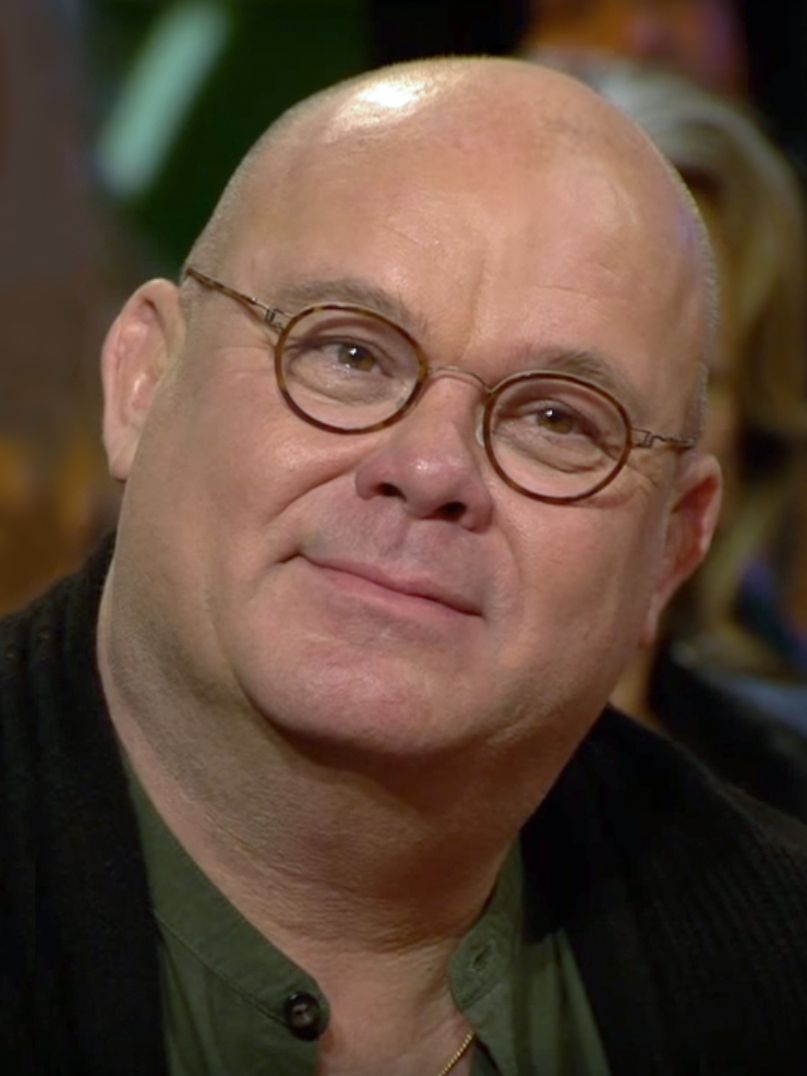
- De Leeuw in 2018
- Born: Paul Henri de Leeuw; 26 March 1962 (age 64); Rotterdam, Netherlands
- Occupations: Actor, comedian, singer, television presenter
- Employer: VARA
- Spouse: Stephan Nugter
- Children: Kas and Tobey (both adopted)
- Website: www.pauldeleeuw.nl

Paul Henri de Leeuw (born 26 March 1962) is a Dutch television comedian, singer and actor.

== Background ==
De Leeuw gained national fame in the late eighties and early nineties with television shows for broadcasting company VARA. He often came into publicity with satire about Dutch show business personalities and taboo subject matter. His shows would often feature musical acts, many of which managed to gain national fame after they had been in De Leeuw's show (e.g. Twarres and René Klijn, a former boyband member who contracted HIV). VARA has since continued his shows apart from a few interruptions, often with considerable success.

In the early nineties, De Leeuw also had some shows celebrating the new year. In the 1993–1994 show he satirized the new commercial television station RTL 5 by announcing another new station, "RTL 6" (RTL six, beter dan niks [lit. RTL six, better than nothing]). This led to a lawsuit by the RTL company.

De Leeuw and his husband, Stephan Nugter, have adopted two children: son Kas (adopted in October 2001) and son Tobey (adopted in December 2002).

De Leeuw has had many hit singles in the Netherlands. He is most famous for: Vlieg met me mee (#2), Ik wil niet dat je liegt / Waarheen, waarvoor (#1), and 'k Heb je lief (#3).

On Koninginnedag 2007 he was made a Knight of the Order of the Netherlands Lion.

== 25th Anniversary ==
De Leeuw until mid-2009 hosted the weekly chat and comedy show Mooi! Weer De Leeuw. On 29 November 2008, he celebrated his 25th television anniversary by staging a 12-hour marathon. Not forgetting the reason Mooi! Weer De Leeuw happened, he invited his one-time collaborator Jack Spijkerman (whose Kopspijkers previously filled the Mooi! Weer De Leeuw time slot) to reprise one item from Kopspijkers; other guests included comedians Herman van Veen and Brigitte Kaandorp, and singer/musical actor Danny de Munk.

== Eurovision Song Contest 2006 incident ==
De Leeuw is best-known internationally for presenting the results of the Dutch televote in the Eurovision Song Contest 2006. A spokesperson is supposed to present the televote by simply thanking the presenters, performers and fans, before giving the result, but instead De Leeuw gave his mobile phone number to the presenter Sakis Rouvas live on-air, and made ad-lib comments, which somewhat lengthened the Dutch results as compared to other countries.

De Leeuw also remarked that Rouvas and his female co-presenter Maria Menounos reminded him of Will & Grace. As the results were live and required for the contest to continue, De Leeuw could not be cut off until he finished giving the voting results.

De Leeuw's actions resulted in negative comments from the commentators, with the BBC's Terry Wogan calling the act "pathetic" and asking "Who selected this eejit?" during the United Kingdom coverage of the contest. The Portuguese Eládio Clímaco didn't translate the remarks properly and said "he was saying that they really look like Greeks".

De Leeuw presented the votes again for the Netherlands at the 2007 contest, but this time did not cause as much of a stir as he did the year before.

== Animal rights dispute and controversy ==
During a 2008 episode of Mooi! Weer De Leeuw, a vegan streaker wearing only briefs, wanting to draw attention to animal suffering managed to enter the sound stage. His body was covered in slogans such as "Stop animal suffering" and "Meat is murder". De Leeuw stopped security from escorting him from the stage to talk with him. De Leeuw pulled the man onto his lap and started poking at his underwear, insisting on "seeing his meat". As the man stood up, De Leeuw pulled down and eventually ripped off his underwear, saying, "if you're going to streak, you have to streak; off with those briefs."

The streaker later filed a police report, although the molestation charges have since been dropped. Some parents were shocked by the incident as the show was targeted at families as well.

== Israeli broadcast commotion ==
De Leeuw identifies as a strong Eurovision Song Contest follower with his own perspectives and beliefs. He presented Nationaal Songfestival, the Dutch national final, in 1993, 1994, 1998, 1999, 2000, 2001, 2006 and 2007. In 1998 and 1999 together with Linda de Mol. In 1995, a lot of commotion came out of this because he had started a tirade and outburst against the Israeli song Amen.

== Works ==
In 2005, de Leeuw wrote the introduction to the Dutch edition of The Eurovision Song Contest – The Official History by John Kennedy O'Connor.

== Awards ==
- 1995, Geuzenprijs with Geert van Istendael

== Discography ==
- Voor u majesteit (1991)
- Van u wil ik zingen (1992)
- Plugged (1993)
- ParaCDmol (1994)
- Filmpje (1995)
- In heel Europa was er niemand zoals zij (1995)
- Encore (1996)
- Lief (1997)
- Stille liedjes (1999)
- Kerstkransje (2001)
- Zingen terwijl u wacht (2001)
- Metropaul (2004)
- Duizel mij (2005)
- Mooi! Weer Een Cd (2006)
- Het wordt winter (2008)
- Honderd uit één (2009)
- Paul (2012)
- Land van mij (2016)

== Filmography ==
List of films in which Paul de Leeuw performed as an actor:

- Jan Rap en z'n maat (1989)
- Filmpje! (1995)
- Heerlijk duurt het langst (1998)
- De Pijnbank (1998)
- Max Lupa (1999)
- Yes Nurse! No Nurse! (2002)
- K3 en het magische medaillon (2004)
- Alles is liefde (2007)
- Spion van Oranje (2009)
- Alle tijd (2011)
