= EenVandaag =

Dutch television news program

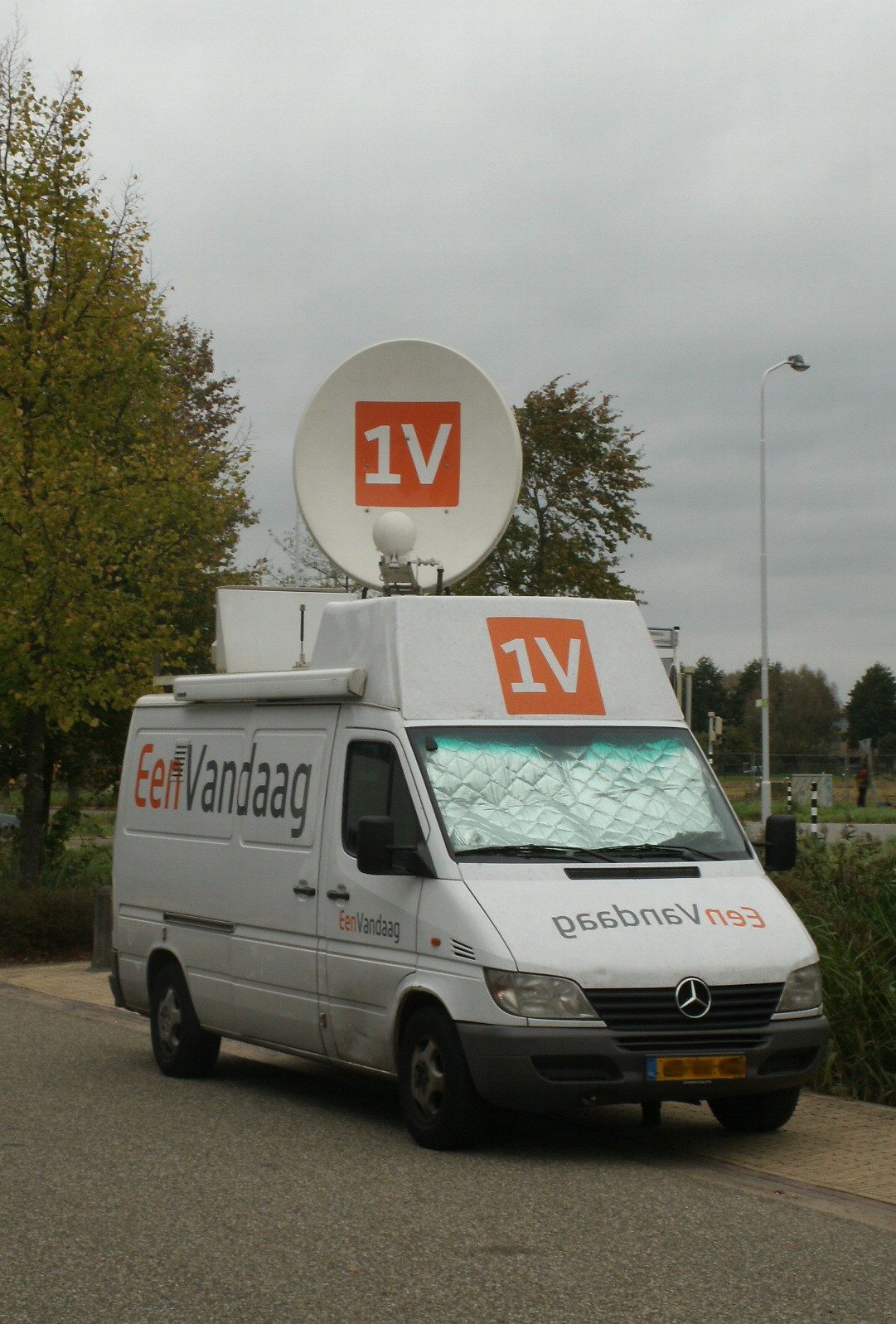
- EenVandaag satellite truck
- Also known as: Twee Vandaag
- Genre: Current affairs
- Directed by: Jan Kriek
- Presented by: Bas van Werven, Pieter Jan Hagens
- Country of origin: Netherlands
- Original language: Dutch

Production
- Production location: Hilversum, Netherlands
- Camera setup: Multi-camera
- Production company: AVROTROS

Original release
- Network: Nederland 2; NPO 1
- Release: 1993 – present

EénVandaag (OneToday) is a current affairs programme broadcast on the Dutch public television network NPO 1 (formerly Nederland 1), The programme, which airs on Monday to Saturday evenings at 6:15pm CET is a co-production of the broadcasting associations AVRO and TROS, and since 2014 AVROTROS.

Eén Vandaag initially aired on Nederland 2 as Twee Vandaag and was launched in 1993 as a joint-production between the pillar broadcasters TROS, the EO and Veronica. Up until that point, the three companies had produced their own weekly current affairs programmes - TROS Aktua, Tijdsein (EO) and Nieuwslijn (Veronica). Since then, the roll-call of participating broadcasters has changed several times. Currently, the programme is presented on alternate nights by Bas van Werven (originalfrom TROS) and Pieter Jan Hagens (original from AVRO). The programme's editor-in-chief is Jan Kriek.

EénVandaag is also broadcast each weekday on the international television station BVN.

== Dossier EenVandaag ==
Since 2014 EenVandaag has also a spin off called Dossier EenVandaag that will be broadcast irregular, the concept is that questions were answered by Jan Born and Sander 't Sas, the emphasis is on criminality, corruption and secret documents leaked by whistleblowers.

== Opinion panel ==
A recurring feature of the program is the Opinion Panel, a group of over 35,000 viewers who are regularly asked, via the Internet, for their opinion on current topics. This makes it one of the largest opinion panels in the Netherlands.

=== Politician of the year ===
In December 2004 the members of the opinion panel (together with members of parliament), were asked to choose their "politician of the year". Each group was asked to rank both the best and the worst politicians.

The parliamentarians chose as their best politician the Socialist Party leader Jan Marijnissen, followed by CDA leader (and Prime Minister at the time) Jan Peter Balkenende, followed by Wouter Bos (leader of the PvdA). As worst politician they chose Rita Verdonk, describing her as an "elephant in a china cabinet" (a Dutch expression meaning ruthless and incompetent). Geert Wilders and Mark Rutte are also elected to the Politician of the Year.

The members of the opinion panel also selected Marijnissen as best politician, but chose Bos as the worst. Remarkably, Verdonk appeared in second place and Balkenende in third on both the best and the worst lists.

== Presenters and editors ==
Current

- Jan Kriek (editor-in-chief)
- Bas van Werven (presenter)
- Pieter Jan Hagens (presenter)
- Rik van de Westelaken (presenter)
- Suzanne Bosman (presenter)
- Rob Hadders (presenter)
- Roos Moggré (presenter)
- Hila Noorzai (presenter)

Former

- Peter Beker (EO; editor in chief)
- Tijs van den Brink (EO; presenter)
- Pieter Jan Hagens (AVRO; presenter)
- Jaap Jongbloed (TROS; presenter)
- Klaas Samplonius (TROS; editor in chief)
- Jeroen Snel (EO; presenter)
- André Zwartbol (EO; presenter)
- Antoinette Hertsenberg (TROS)
