= Buitenhof (TV program) =

Dutch television news programme

- Country of origin: Netherlands

Production
- Production companies: AVROTROS; BNNVARA; VPRO; NPO

Original release
- Network: NPO 1
- Release: 3 September 1995 – present

Buitenhof is a Dutch political interview programme produced by AVROTROS, BNNVARA, VPRO, and NPO and is broadcast on NPO 1 on Sunday afternoons, immediately after the short midday edition of NOS Journaal. The first edition of Buitenhof aired on 3 September 1995, when the interview programme Het Capitool succeeded. The programme takes its name from the Binnenhof, The Hague, which includes a place Buitenhof (lit. outer court).

Twan Huys, Maaike Schoon and Joost Vullings are the programme's alternating presenters. It is broadcast from a studio Hilversum with a view on the nature outside. The editor-in-chief is Karel Kuyl. Former hosts are Paul Witteman, Rob Trip, Marcia Luyten, Pieter Jan Hagens and others.

== The programme ==
Buitenhof is an influential programme, and is regularly visited by the nation's top politicians, policymakers, representatives of trade unions and employers' federations, scientists, and opinion makers. There is a strong emphasis on international events, and international guests regularly appear on the programme.

== Incidents ==
Buitenhof itself made news in 2000, when visiting Vlaams Belang politician Filip Dewinter was smeared with chocolate, on camera, by anti-fascism activists.

The programme is also broadcast each Sunday on the international television station BVN.

== See also ==
- De zevende dag, televised in Flanders, Belgium by the VRT.
