= Frits Wester =

Dutch journalist (born 1962)

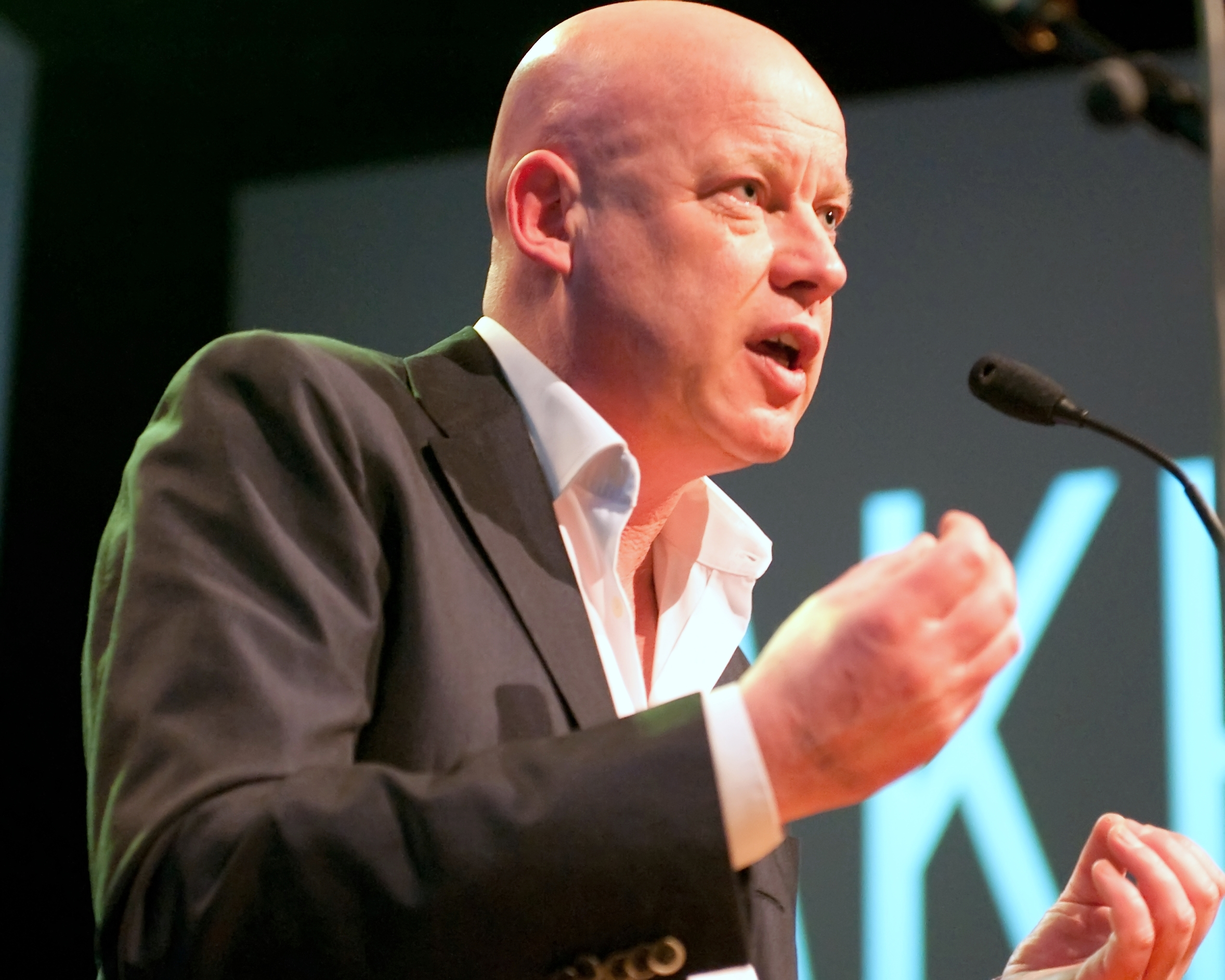
- Wester in 2010
- Born: 29 March 1962 (age 64); Veenendaal, Netherlands
- Occupation: Journalist

Frits Wester (born 29 March 1962) is a Dutch journalist. He is best known as parliamentary correspondent for RTL Nieuws.

== Biography ==
Wester was born in 1962 in the Dutch town Veenendaal. He was already engaged in politics at a young age, and was a co-founder of the youth wing of the Christian Democrats, CDJA (CDA-jongeren) in Alkmaar. When he was 22, he was involved in local organizations that were active on a range of political hot topics, including abortion, euthanasia, unemployment and nuclear arms.

He was the driver of the leader of the Christian Democrats (CDA) in the House of Representatives Bert de Vries, which was his introduction to national politics. He was offered a job at the group's communications department and became the personal spokesperson for Elco Brinkman, a prominent politician. In the campaign for the 1994 parliamentary elections, he came up with the concept of a walk-and-talk presentation, which was then dubbed the 'Brinkman Shuffle'.

The elections didn't turn out favorable for CDA though, and as they lost 20 seats they were not part of the new coalition government. As the first Purple coalition was formed, Brinkman left parliament and Wester started working as a journalist at RTL Nieuws. He was a frequent guest at the popular late night talk show Barend & Van Dorp and at the business channel RTL Z. He built a reputation to be the first with political news, and was able to publish the national budget before its embargo ended at Prinsjesdag (start of the parliamentary year and speech from the throne). He remained a member of CDA.

In 2005, he claimed during an interview that he was approached short after Pim Fortuyn's death to become State Secretary for immigration and later for media. He claimed that he refused both times because he enjoyed being a journalist. During the 2006 elections he stated in another interview that he would be available as State Secretary if Jan Peter Balkenende would hypothetically ask him (he later said to have misspoken).

In 2004, Wester won the Nationale Nieuwsquiz, a national news quiz. It was claimed that he would have cheated and been provided with at least one correct answer by another contestant that had seen the script, which Wester denied. In 2008, he appeared in the first season of the television show 5 jaar later.

In September 2019, Wester took some time off for health reasons – which later turned out to be an alcohol addiction. This meant that he was unable to report on Prinsjesdag that year. Wester visited an addiction clinic in South-Africa during this professional break and he arrived back home at the end of October.
