= Mike and Thomas Show =

Dutch television show

The Mike and Thomas Show was a Dutch comedy panel game broadcast on NPO 3 (VARA) between 2005 and 2009. It was created and presented by the cabaret performers Mike Boddé and Thomas van Luyn.

The television program, presented from behind two grand pianos, was set up as a parody of the game show format, comparable to the BBC show Shooting Stars. The first series was broadcast in 2005 and the fifth and final series in 2009. In 2007 the show received the Beeld en Geluid Award for Best Entertainment.
