= Kopspijkers =

Dutch television show

Kopspijkers is a talk show that ran on the Dutch public television from 1995 to 2005 (first named Spijkers). A recipient, in 2003, of the annual Zilveren Nipkow best-show award from Dutch television critics, the programme was produced by the left-of-centre public broadcaster VARA. It was hosted by Jack Spijkerman, hence the title.

Humorous in style, the show was particularly noted for its satirical sketches. Until 2001 it was 'normal' cabaret, but in September 2001 (which happened to be the week of the 9/11 terrorist attacks) the show started with imitations of famous people. These were much like those featured in the British TV programme Spitting Image, but used real actors. Political leaders like Jan Peter Balkenende, Wouter Bos and Gerrit Zalm were frequently impersonated. At first only Dutch people were impersonated, later also foreign celebrities (including Tony Blair, Nelson Mandela, John Kerry and Viktor Yushchenko) were impersonated. In recent episodes even historical characters, like Napoleon Bonaparte, Anne Frank, Plato and Joseph Stalin were imitated. Kopspijkers was amongst the most viewed programmes in the Netherlands. At the start of the Iraq War one of their sketches "BZN in Baghdad", went viral on the internet in the English-speaking world, and included BZN impersonators chroma-keyed into newsreel footage of combat and the toppling of Saddam Hussein's statue

On several occasions, the imitations have caused controversies. The first imitation episode showed sensationalist TV presenter Willibrord Frequin chasing Osama bin Laden asking "why he had been so cowardly" and "why he sent thousands of people into death". Pim Fortuyn was often imitated, which led to accusations against Kopspijkers after he was assassinated. In November 2003 Prime Minister Jan Peter Balkenende and Minister Piet Hein Donner complained about the 'tasteless' imitations of members of the royal family. Queen Beatrix later said she had no problems with being imitated. In 2005, Jack Spijkerman decided to cancel his contract with VARA and sign with the newly formed channel Talpa. Though Spijkerman intended to finish the running season, VARA cut it short and cancelled the 4 remaining shows. Spijkerman made a similar (but commonly deemed of less quality) show on Talpa, called Koppensnellers but after bankruptcy of the channel it disappeared of the Dutch TV.

In 2004 similar shows were broadcast in Germany and Belgium, but they weren't very popular.
