= Het Familiediner =

Dutch television show

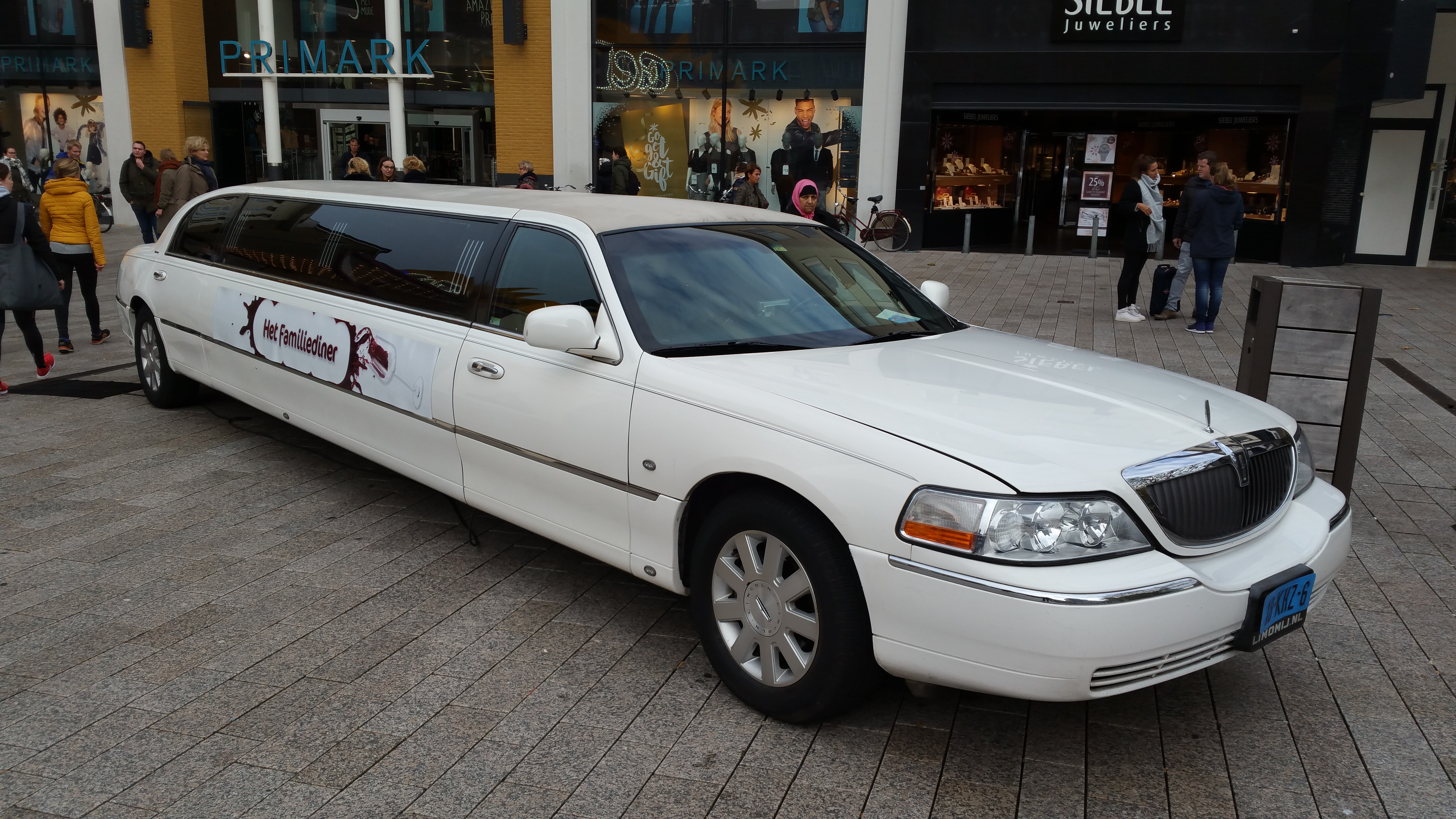
- Limousine used in the show (seen in 2016)
- Presented by: Bert van Leeuwen
- Country of origin: Netherlands
- Original language: Dutch

Original release
- Network: NPO 1
- Release: 2000

Het Familiediner (Dutch for: The Family Dinner) is a Dutch television show by the Evangelische Omroep in which Bert van Leeuwen helps families take the first step towards resolving a family conflict. The show first aired in 2000 and more than 240 episodes have been produced.

In the show, Van Leeuwen visits those involved and he lets them tell their side of the story. After that, he invites them to attend a dinner that is being prepared while they speak. In the evening, a limousine drives to both parties to bring them to the restaurant. Each party decides whether to accept or decline the invitation by entering the limousine or by letting it return without any passengers.

The show also offers mediation afterwards in case this is needed to work towards resolving the conflict.
