= Loretta Schrijver =

Dutch television presenter (1956–2025)

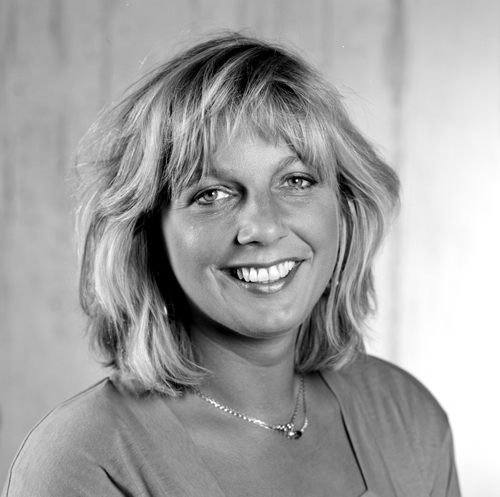
- Schrijver in 1989
- Born: 16 May 1956; New York City, U.S.
- Died: 27 March 2025 (aged 68)

Loretta Maxine Schrijver (16 May 1956 – 27 March 2025) was a Dutch television presenter.

== Life and career ==
=== Youth, education and early career ===
Schrijver was born in New York; her father was a textile entrepreneur, and the family moved back and forth between the Netherlands and the US, depending on the business fortunes of her father's companies. A few months after her birth, they moved to Amsterdam, and a few years later to Los Angeles. She returned definitively to the Netherlands when she was eight, and lived in The Hague, Venlo, and Zandvoort until settling in Amsterdam, where she finished secondary school (gymnasium). After graduation she spent time in Paris, improving her French at the Alliance française.

Schrijver wanted to become an actress but was rejected, twice, for the drama academy, and then studied to become a translator, in Amsterdam. She had a few minor parts in plays and turned down a larger role after deciding to study history. Her interest in the news was kindled during a summer job as a receptionist, where she read the newspaper every day, and she applied for a job with the NOS, which had started the Teletext program; she was hired to do subtitles for TV programs. A few years later, she was hired by Radio Netherlands Worldwide as a newsreader, and met Jeroen Pauw, with whom she had a romantic relationship as well. Becoming a freelancer, she took various jobs, as a director for TV programs and as a presenter for Veronica Nieuwsradio. Veronica was so impressed with her that they hired her to succeed Jaap van Meekren, presenting the news program Nieuwslijn on television. Veronica went commercial, merging into RTL Véronique (which later became RTL 4), and Schrijver was offered the job as a news anchor.

=== Television career ===
As a news anchor, Schrijver joined her former partner Jeroen Pauw, and for many years they jointly presented the main news program, RTL Nieuws, at 19.30. Having a set of two presenters, a practice borrowed from the US, was new to Dutch TV, but it worked well. In 2000, she exchanged RTL 4 for the AVRO and co-hosted the television program Alle dieren tellen mee (All animals count). After working there for a year, she decided that public broadcasting didn't suit her, and she returned to the RTL News.

In 2005, she was acclaimed the most popular news anchor in the Netherlands in a survey.

Since 2019, Schrijver was a jury member in the Dutch version of The Masked Singer.

=== Personal life and death ===
Schrijver was diagnosed with colon cancer in 2019. She had surgery in 2021, but it returned in October 2023 and had metastasized. She died of cancer on 27 March 2025, at the age of 68.
