= RTL Nieuws =

Dutch television news service

- Genre: News program
- Presented by: Pepijn Crone; Daphne Lammers; Anita Sara Nederlof; Antoin Peeters; Peter van Zadelhoff; Others
- Composer: See leader music
- Country of origin: Netherlands (formally Luxembourg)
- Original language: Dutch

Production
- Production locations: Studio 9 & Studio 14, RTL-gebouw (Building 16), Media Park, Hilversum
- Running time: Varies
- Production company: NEP The Netherlands

Original release
- Network: RTL 4
- Release: 2 October 1989 – present

RTL Nieuws is a Dutch television news service produced by RTL Nederland. The national and international news service produces 17 bulletins each weekday and six weekend bulletins for RTL 4 and RTL Z, reaching a total audience of about 1.5 million people. With the evening broadcast sometimes reaching over 2 million viewers.

RTL Nieuws' main competitor is NOS Journaal, broadcast by the Nederlandse Omroep Stichting (Dutch Broadcasting Foundation) for public service television and radio. RTL co-operates primarily with the Flemish commercial television channel VTM and RTL Germany for international news coverage.

== Bulletins ==
On weekdays, at 6:30am and on the hour and half hour between 7am & 9am, RTL Onbijtnieuws (RTL Breakfast News) bulletins are broadcast on RTL 4. An hourly daytime service of 15-minute bulletins airs on RTLZ between 8am and 5:30pm, featuring business news round-ups and 'normal' news.

Seven days a week, three evening bulletins air on RTL 4 in the form of a short 6pm bulletin, a main evening 20-minute programme at 7:30pm and a 10-minute late night bulletin at varying times. The Sunday edition of the 7:30pm news also features a short review of the past week's events.

In addition, RTL Nieuws produces an hourly daytime service called RTL Z combining news bulletins and business & financial updates on weekdays. A topical magazine programme, Editie NL, is also broadcast each weekday evening on RTL 4.

== On-air team ==
=== RTL Ontbijtnieuws (RTL Breakfast News) (6.30–9.05) (RTL 4) ===
Years	Presenter	Current role
2022–present	Robbie Kammeijer	Main presenter (Monday-Thursday)
2013–present	Meike de Jong	Main presenter (Friday) & relief presenter
2017–present	Steef van Stiphout	Relief presenter
2021–present	Boyan Ephraim	Relief presenter

==== Former presenters ====
- Selma van Dijk (relief; 1998–2003)
- Geert Gordijn (relief; 2008, 2012–2013)
- Elizabeth Heijkoop (relief; 2000–2002)
- Rob Hessing (main; 1990–1993)
- Jan de Hoop (main; 1989-2022)
- Marc Jacobs (main; 1990–1995)
- Daphne Lammers (relief; 2012–2013)
- Jeroen Latijnhouwers (relief; 1998-2000, 2012-2014)
- Pascalle Luycks (relief; 2005–2008)
- Diana Matroos (relief; 2012–2013)
- Riks Ozinga (relief; 1999–2002)
- Diana Sno (relief; 2000–2002)
- Sanne Staarink (main: 2011-2019)
- Femke Wolthuis (main; 2002–2011)
- Peter van Zadelhoff (relief; 2011–2012)

=== RTL Z Nieuws (8.00–17.55) (RTL Z) ===
Years	Presenter	Current role
2019–present	Ann-Lynn Hamelink	Main presenter
2016–present	Carien ten Have	Main presenter
2018–present	Frederieke Hegger	Main presenter
2001–present	Roland Koopman	Main presenter
2021–present	Frederique Dormaar	Relief presenter
2013–present	Meike de Jong	Relief presenter
2020–present	Sam Trompert	Relief presenter
2017–present	Peter van Zadelhoff	Relief presenter

==== Former presenters ====
- Sanne Boswinkel (2005-2019)
- Hella Hueck (2008-2015)
- Marc de Jong (relief; 2008-2019)
- Elianne Kuepers (2016-2017)
- Jeroen Latijnhouwers (1997–2003)
- Pascalle Luycks (2005–2008)
- Peter van der Maat (2001–2005)
- Diana Matroos (2004-2016)
- Jaap van Meekren (1989–1993)
- Antoin Peeters (2001–2003)
- Esther van Rijswijk (2004)
- Guikje Roethof (2002)
- Loretta Schrijver (2001–2007)
- Nico Steenbergen (2001–2008)
- Margreet Spijker (relief; 2012–2013)
- Roderick Veelo (main; 2005-2018)
- Peter van Zadelhoff (main; 2008-2015)

=== Editie NL (18.15–18.35) (RTL 4) ===
Years	Presenter	Current role
2007–present	Margreet Beetsma	Main presenter
2016–present	Robbie Kammeijer	Main presenter
2014–present	Jetske Schrijver	Main presenter
2016–present	Steef van Stiphout	Main presenter
2016–present	Anne van der Meer	Relief presenter
2021–present	Maarten Holla	Relief presenter
2016–present	Meike de Jong	Relief presenter

==== Former presenters ====
- Wilson Boldewijn (main early bulletin; 2007-2015)
- Roel Geeraedts (main late bulletin; 2004–2005)
- Petra Grijzen (relief early bulletin; 2012)
- Elsemieke Havenga (main early bulletin; 2003–2006)
- Jan de Hoop (relief early bulletin; 2003–2007)
- Brecht van Hulten (relief early bulletin; 2010)
- Roland Koopman (relief late bulletin; 2005)
- Daphne Lammers (main late bulletin; 2004–2005, main early bulletin; 2007–2014)
- Jeroen Latijnhouwers (main early bulletin; 2003-2014)
- Pernille La Lau (relief early bulletin; 2006–2008)
- Diana Matroos (relief early bulletin; 2013-2016)
- Daan Nieber (main early bulletin; 2014-2016)
- Margreet Spijker (main early bulletin; 2003–2011)
- Peter van Zadelhoff (relief early bulletin; 2012-2015)

=== RTL Nieuws (18.00, 19.30, Late) (RTL 4) ===
Years	Presenter	Current role
2014–present	Daphne Lammers	Main presenter (Monday-Saturday)
2015–present	Antoin Peeters	Main presenter (Monday-Saturday)
2020–present	Anita Sara Nederlof	Main presenter (Monday-Saturday)
2016–present	Pepijn Crone	Main presenter (Monday-Saturday)
2016–present	Peter van Zadelhoff	Main presenter (Monday-Saturday)
2020–present	Ann-Lynn Hamelink	Relief presenter (Monday-Sunday)
2015–present	Meike de Jong	Relief presenter (Monday-Sunday)
2019–present	Carien ten Have	Main presenter (Sunday)
2018–present	Robbie Kammeijer	Main presenter (Sunday) & relief presenter
2014–present	Jetske Schrijver	Main presenter (Sunday) & relief presenter

==== Former presenters ====
- Vivian Boelen (1991–1995) (main presenter)
- Suzanne Bosman (1999–2013) (main presenter)
- Sanne Boswinkel (2007-2015) (relief presenter)
- Selma van Dijk (1998–2003) (Late)
- Elsemieke Havenga (2002–2003) (main presenter)
- Elizabeth Heijkoop (2000–2002) (at Sunday)
- Roelof Hemmen (2003-2016) (main presenter)
- Roland Koopman (1999–2001) (at Six)
- Leo de Later (1989–1999) (main presenter)
- Jeroen Latijnhouwers (1998–2003) (main presenter)
- Diana Matroos (2013-2016) (relief presenter)
- Jaap van Meekren (1989–1993) (at Six)
- Rick Nieman (1996-2015) (main presenter)
- Edvard Niessing (1995–1998) (Late)
- Jeroen Pauw (1989–2000) (main presenter)
- Loretta Schrijver (1989–2000, 2001–2007) (main presenter)
- Sander Simons (1989–1999) (Late)
- Margreet Spijker (1998–2014) (main presenter)
- Sanne Staarink (2015-2019) (main at Sunday and relief presenter)
- Mariëlle Tweebeeke (2007–2010) (main presenter)
- Margriet Vroomans (1994–1998) (main presenter)
- Merel Westrik (2014-2019) (main presenter)
- Peter van Zadelhoff (2015) (relief presenter)

=== RTL Weather (RTL 4/RTL Z) ===
Years	Presenter	Current role
2015–present	Maurice Middendorp	Main presenter
2019–present	Marjon de Hond	Main presenter
2013–present	William Huizinga	Main presenter
2019–present	Marc de Jong	Main presenter
2014–present	Nicolien Kroon	Main presenter
1989–present	Reinier van den Berg	Relief (since 2018)

==== Former presenters ====
- John Bernard (1989–2002)
- Laura van der Blij (2013)
- Heleen de Boer (1989–1991)
- Jennifer Faber (2014-2018)
- Helga van Leur (1997-2017)
- Amara Onwuka (2013-2019)
- Harry Otten (1989–2000)
- Margot Ribberink (1993-2014)
- Peter Timofeeff (1996-2015)
- Dennis Wilt (2008-2019)

=== Correspondents ===
Politics

- Fons Lambie
- Roel Schreinemachers
- Marieke van de Zilver
- Floor Bremer
- Frits Wester

National

- Silvia Brens
- Reinoud Broekhuijsen (Internet)
- Hans de Bruijn (Economics)
- Pepijn Crone
- Jaap van Deurzen
- Merijn Doggen (Technologies)
- Betty Glas
- Geert Gordijn
- Peper Hofstede (Sports)
- Rick Konijnenbelt
- Marcel Maijer (Sports)
- Olivia Manders (Economics)
- Jildou van Opzeeland
- Sander Paulus (Royalty)
- Koen de Regt (Research)
- Britta Sanders
- Hans Schutte
- Tuur Verdonck
- Jeroen Wetzels (Justice)
- Hester van Yperen (Research)

International

- Jeroen Akkermans (2001–present; Germany, Eastern Europe & Caucasus, 1989-1995; Russia, 1996-2001; The United Kingdom)
- Niels Guns (2014–present; South Asia)
- Saskia Houttuin (2018–present; Africa)
- Olaf Koens (2015–present; Middle East & Turkey, 2011-2015; Russia)
- Sandra Korstjens (2013–present; South America)
- Erik Mouthaan (2006–present; North & Central America)
- Eveline Rethmeier (2015–present; Greece, Italy, Malta & Vatican)
- Anne Saenen (2015–present; The United Kingdom)
- Martijn Smiers (2018–present; Russia)
- Alex Tieleman (2015–present; Portugal & Spain)
- Stefan de Vries (2006–present; France)

Former international correspondents

- Michiel Bicker Caarten (1989-1991; The United States)
- Emma Blijdenstein (2001-2007; Israel)
- Silvia Brens (2002-2006; South Africa and 2009-2014; Southeast Europe & Turkey)
- Reinoud Broekhuijsen (1995-2007; Russia)
- Sjoerd den Daas (2018-2019; China and East Asia)
- Fidan Ekiz (2005-2007; Turkey)
- Roel Geeraedts (2011-2015; Middle East)
- Nina Jurna (2000-2010; Surinam and 2011-2013; South America)
- Marloes de Koning (2014-2016; Southeast Europe & Turkey)
- Vanessa Lamsvelt (2010-2015; The United Kingdom)
- Arthur de Leeuw (2008-2014; Africa)
- Len Middelbeek (1995-1997; Germany)
- Conny Mus † (1989-2010; Israel & The Middle East)
- Koen de Regt (2014-2017; Africa)
- Esther van Rijswijk (2001-2004; The United Kingdom)
- Carolien van Tilburg (Japan)
- Pauline Valkenet (1991-1993; Russia, 1995-1998; The United Kingdom and 2000-2015; Italy, Malta & Vatican
- Marije Vlaskamp (2003-2017; Far East)
- Max Westerman (1989-1991; Germany & Eastern Europe and 1991-2006; USA & Canada)
