= 2 voor 12 =

Dutch quiz show

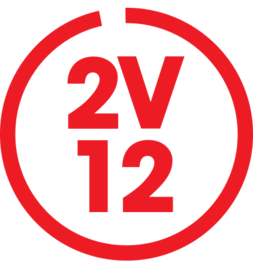
- Also known as: Twee voor Twaalf; 2V12
- Genre: Game show
- Created by: Ellen Blazer
- Presented by: Joop Koopman (1971–1981); Astrid Joosten (1991–present)
- Voices of: Joop van Zijl (1971−2018); Job Cohen (2018–present)
- Country of origin: Netherlands
- Original language: Dutch

Original release
- Network: VARA (1971−2017); BNNVARA (2017−present) Channel: NPO 2
- Release: 1 October 1971 – 19 December 1981
- Release: 16 March 1991 – present

2 voor 12 (English: '2 to 12'), formerly Twee voor Twaalf, and stylized as 2V 12, is a Dutch game show broadcast weekly since 1971 by BNNVARA (VARA until 2017) on NPO 2. Joop Koopman hosted the original version of the program, which aired from 1971 to 1981. A revival, hosted by Astrid Joosten, has aired since 1991. The program is the longest-running quiz program on Dutch television.

== Gameplay ==
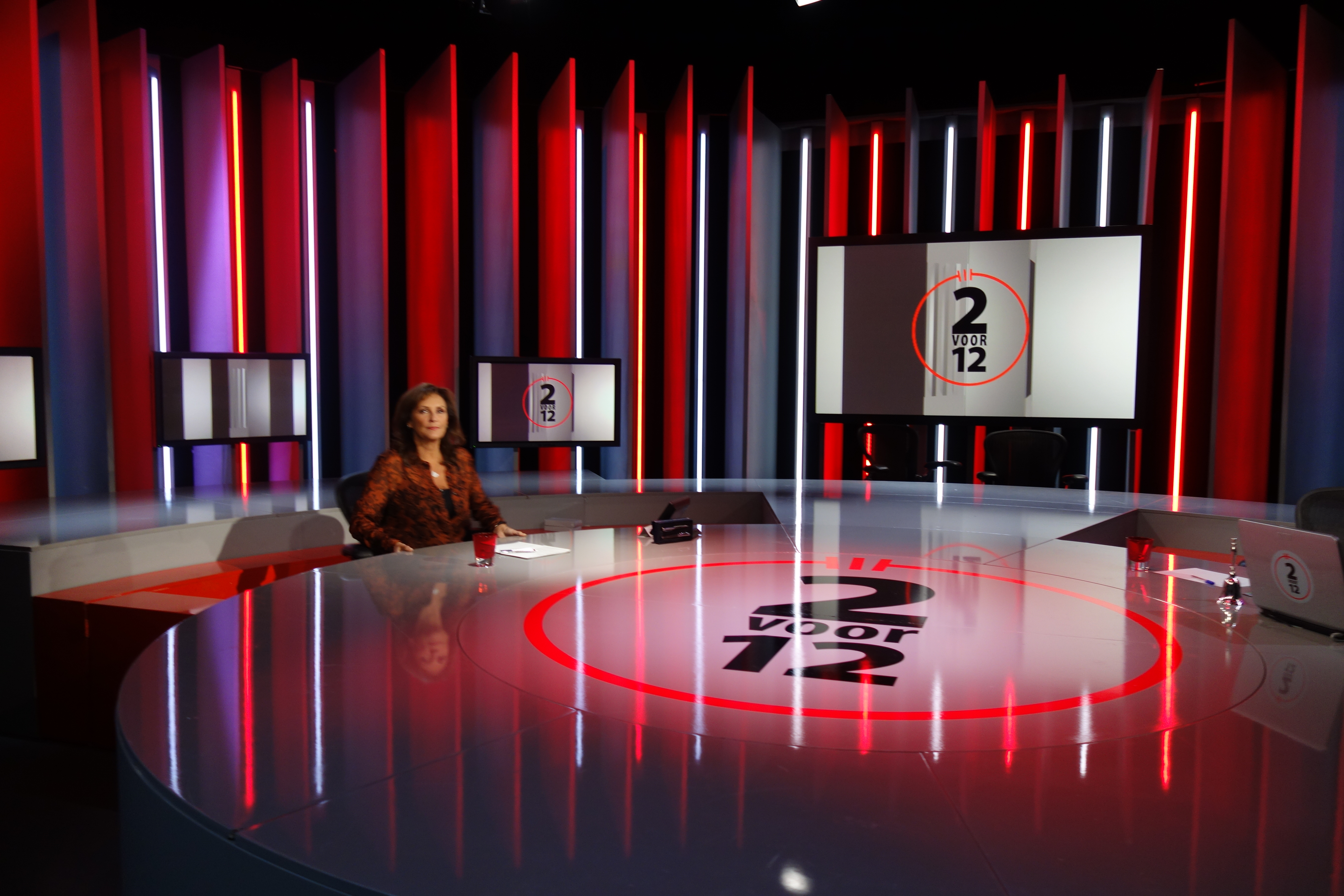
Astrid Joosten on the show's set in 2017.

In the program, two teams of two contestants are given twelve questions to answer with the help of reference books and, in more recent editions, Dutch Wikipedia. Players cannot see if their answers are right or wrong until after the conclusion of the quiz, however, the viewing audience is shown (since the 1991 revival) which answers are right and which ones are wrong. In more recent years, one question consists of a puzzle: either a paardensprong ('horse jump'), in which the team must solve an eight-letter word by jumping around a three-by-three grid in the style of a chess knight to spell out the word, or a taartdiagram ('pie chart'), in which the team must solve a nine-letter word by viewing eight letters in a circle; the team must work out in which direction the word is being spelled (clockwise or counterclockwise), as well as the letter the word begins with and the missing letter.

A team that is playing their first game has 15 minutes to complete their round. The team begins with a stake of points (600 on the original version; increased to 1,200 from 1991 to 2002; reduced back to 600 in 2002 concurrently with the introduction of the Euro, and further reduced to 500 in 2015).

The first letter of each answer forms an anagram the contestants must unscramble to find a twelve-letter word. Points are deducted as the references are used (currently, one point for every two seconds one player spends researching an answer, or one point per second if both players are researching simultaneously; from 1991 to 2002, one point per second for one player researching; two points per second if both players were doing so). The player who is doing the research must ring a bell to indicate that they have found an answer and stop the team's score from decreasing; they then give their answer during the next pause between questions, indicating which question they are answering. Teams may change their answers as often as they like until they begin to solve the anagram. Once two minutes remain in the round, the team must begin to solve the anagram. The team may begin before this point if they are satisfied with their answers, however, the time remaining is automatically decreased to two minutes if they do so (prior to 2009, this was not the case; the team could use all of their remaining time if they wished). Any questions that remain unanswered at this point have their spaces filled in on the board with dashes.

While solving the anagram, the team may attempt to place letters in the correct position at a cost of 10 points per letter (25 from 1991 to 2002), however, if the answer given was incorrect, a question mark is placed instead, even if the answer given started with the correct letter. Bonuses are awarded afterward based on the number of correct answers offered, with the highest scoring team winning the game. In the event that both teams finish with the same score, the tie is broken in favor of the team that answered more questions correctly. A team that fails to solve their word automatically loses the game regardless of their score; if neither team solves their word, then both teams lose and two new teams play on the next show.

Bonuses for nine or more correct answers were added beginning upon the program's return in 1991 in order to incentivize players to search for correct answers; originally, this was a flat 200 points. Currently, 25 bonus points are awarded for nine correct answers, with a further 25 for each correct answer beyond that. Beginning in 2015, a 10-point bonus was added for each correct answer given without using any references; this bonus is forfeited on any question in which a team later uses references to confirm the answer.

Questions are presented on myriad subjects in a variety of ways, with many using stock footage, and some being accompanied by animations produced by students at HKU.

Champions are allowed to return for up to three programs; a team playing their second game must complete their round in 14 minutes, and a team playing their third game must complete their round in 13 minutes. A team that has won two games may choose to leave the program and receive double their total score in Euro (or Dutch guilder, prior to 2002, triple their total prior to 2025); a team that wins three games retires from the show and automatically receives 6 times their total score in cash (5 times prior to 2025). The theoretical maximum total winnings by a single team is €12,960 (€10,800 from 2015 to 2025); this requires the team to answer all 12 questions in each of their three games correctly without looking up any answers.

== History ==
Ellen Blazer, a longtime worker for VARA, created the program. Her aim was to create a quiz that people could play even without significant amounts of knowledge. Despite its longevity, the format has not been sold to foreign broadcasters.

Joosten noted upon the program's 50th anniversary in 2021 that the program has been referred to as a Rolls-Royce of quizzes. The program's success has resulted in the catchphrase Dat zoeken we op (English: 'We'll look it up') entering the Dutch lexicon.
