= Pieter Jan Hagens =

Dutch presenter (born 1958)

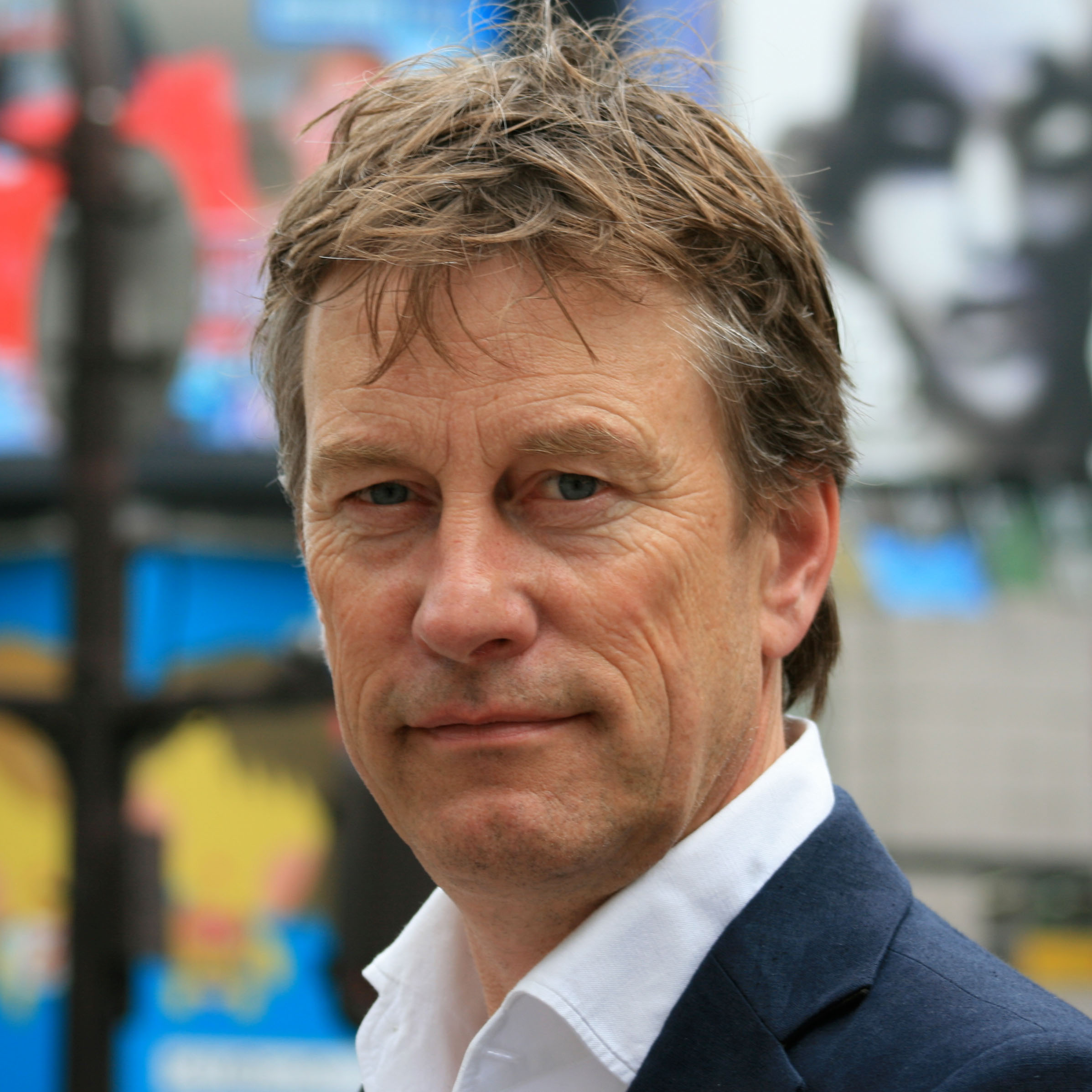
- Pieter Jan Hagens (2009)
- Born: 14 August 1958 (age 68); Amersfoort, Netherlands
- Occupations: Radio and television presenter
- Known for: EenVandaag; Jules Unlimited; Buitenhof; Wie is de Mol?

Pieter Jan Hagens (born 14 August 1958) is a Dutch radio and television presenter. He is known for presenting several news-related shows, including EenVandaag and Buitenhof. He is also known for presenting the television show Wie is de Mol?.

== Career ==
Hagens is known for presenting the current affairs show EenVandaag and political interview show Buitenhof. He also presented the radio program Spijkers met Koppen. He also presented the popular science show Jules Unlimited. In the show, he completed multiple extreme challenges, including jumping from a bridge, cave diving and standing on a flying Boeing Stearman aircraft. He presented the show with other presenters, including Jan Douwe Kroeske and Mieke van der Wey.

Between 2008 and 2011, Hagens presented the popular television show Wie is de Mol?. Art Rooijakkers succeeded him as presenter of the show, as Hagens wanted to focus more on journalism. In 2016, he won the 15th edition of De Grote Geschiedenisquiz, with questions about history, together with Jort Kelder. Hagens and Jort Kelder presented the 2017 television show Ten strijde! about land and sea battles in Dutch history.

Hagens took a sabbatical in 2018 and he went on a sailing voyage. He visited multiple countries, including Suriname and Cape Verde. He returned to work in August 2019. Hagens was a contestant in the 2021 season of the show Maestro presented by Frits Sissing. In the show, contestants compete to become the best conductor. He was eliminated in the fourth episode.

Hagens retired in April 2025. In June 2025, Joost Vullings succeeded Hagens as presenter of Buitenhof. In December 2025, Hagens appeared in an episode of the second anniversary season of the television show Wie is de Mol?, presenting an assignment identical to one in season 11 (which was fully presented by Hagens).

== Personal life ==
Hagens is the father of journalist Sam Hagens.

== Selected filmography ==
=== As presenter ===
- EenVandaag
- Jules Unlimited
- Buitenhof
- 2008 – 2011: Wie is de Mol?
- 2017: Ten strijde!

=== As contestant ===
- 2016: De Grote Geschiedenisquiz
- 2021: Maestro
