= Andries Knevel =

Dutch journalist

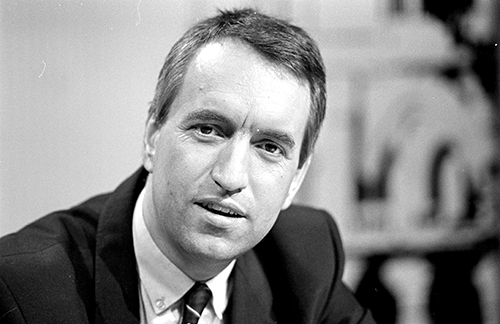
- Knevel in 1987
- Born: 13 February 1952 (age 74); Naarden
- Career
- Station: Evangelische Omroep
- Country: Netherlands

Andries Gerrit Knevel (born 13 February 1952, Naarden) is a Dutch theologian, author and presenter on Dutch radio and tv. From 1993 until 2006, he was television director of the Evangelische Omroep, a Dutch broadcasting organisation with Protestant foundations.

Dutch standup comedian Brigitte Kaandorp performed a satirical song about Knevel.

== Background ==
Knevel grew up in a Christian-Reformed family with a municipal civil servant father and stay-at-home mother. He studied economics at the Vrije Universiteit Amsterdam. Only during his study time, he became a devout Christian. In interviews, Knevel pointed at a specific moment that God entered his life during an economics lecture, and that he decided that he wanted to become a minister instead.

Knevel changed his field of study to theology: first at the Vrije Universiteit, but after a year he switched to Utrecht University, where he graduated in 1979. Alongside his study, he taught theology and society sciences at the Christian high school Farelcollege in Ridderkerk between 1976 and 1978.

== Evangelische Omroep ==
In 1978, Knevel started as free lance desk reporter at the Evangelische Omroep (EO), a Dutch public broadcasting organisation with evangelical-protestant roots. He quickly became a staff member in 1979, and in 1989 took the position of head of informative programs.

In 1992, he started presenting the national television talk show Het Elfde Uur (the eleventh hour). Alongside his public facing job, he took a leadership position of the broadcasting organisation, and became one of its directors between 1993 and 2006.

Between 2001 and 2004, Knevel had his own national talkshow on Saturday, Knevel op Zaterdag (Knevel on Saturday). On the radio, he presented Andries Radio.

Between 2007 and 2014, he presented a summer evening daily talk show on the primary national channel together with Tijs van den Brink: Knevel & Van den Brink. Also together with Van den Brink, he presented the weekly show Moraalridders (Moralists) between 2010 and 2012 and he presented regularly on other EO-produced shows.

In 2013, Knevel started a series of interview or conversation programs about religion. This was first a more general series under the name Andries, but later he focused on the interface between religion and science in Andries en de Wetenschappers (Andries and the scientists).

=== Het Elfde Uur ===
Andries got national recognition for his show Het Elfde Uur. His style was sometimes confrontational and sharp, which was both appreciated and criticized. Especially his gesture of a raised index finger became synonymous for his style, even if he later transformed the gesture. At the concluding episode in 2009, he was awarded the grade of Officer in the chivalrous Order of Orange-Nassau.

=== Creationism ===
In 2005, Knevel declared in a radio talk show that he no longer accepted the classical creationism teaching that the earth was created in six days. He was at the time still a director at the EO, and considered it no longer scientifically acceptable to rely on the historical accuracy of Genesis 1. This was especially notable because the EO was for many years one of the main voices that promoted the creationism in the Netherlands.

In 2009, he angered several of the EO members because he signed during a TV show a document that he did not literally believe in the creationist teachings, and that Darwins theory may be true. He stated that he could be an devout orthodox Protestant, without believing that the world was created six thousand years ago in six times 24 hours, and that he regretted that he misled viewers and children in the past. He later had to offer apologies for giving an impression that his personal view was the view of the EO.

== Authorship ==
Knevel authored a number of books on theology and television. In 2007 and 2008 he published a diary on those years.

Published books include:

- Jezus, de enige weg (Jesus, the only road, 1991)
- De wereld in huis (The world at home, 1992)
- Doe dat ding dan uit! (Then turn off that thing, 1993)
- Geloven doet pijn (Believing hurts, 1995)
- Ruim van hart (A generous heart, 2000)
- Avonduren (Evening hours, 2007)
- Is het waar? (Is it true?, 2008)

He was also editor and secondary author of a number of theological publications, Theologische Verkenningen (Theological explorations). He was editor-in-chief at the Christian opinion magazine Koers and wrote various opinion columns for evangelical and catholic magazines.

== Personal life ==
Knevel is married and has three children. He is a member of the Christian Reformed Churches and visits also the evangelical international church Crossroads in Amstelveen. He often preaches as a theologian in numerous churches.
