= Bert van Leeuwen =

Dutch television presenter (born 1960)

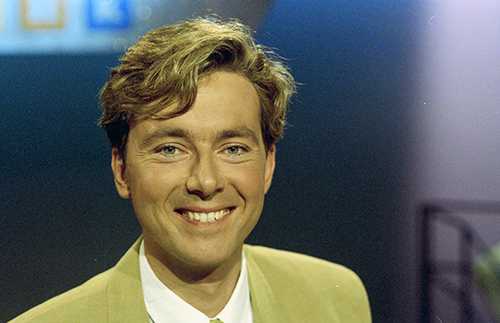
- Bert van Leeuwen (1991)
- Born: 21 March 1960 (age 66); The Hague, Netherlands
- Occupation: Television presenter
- Years active: 1984 - present
- Known for: Het Familiediner

Bert van Leeuwen (born 21 March 1960) is a Dutch television presenter. He is known for presenting many television programs for the broadcasting association Evangelische Omroep (EO), in particular Het Familiediner, De Grootste Royaltykenner van Nederland, De Grote Bijbelquiz and That's the Question.

== Career ==
Van Leeuwen presented the quiz show Ik weet het beter. He presents the show Het Familiediner in which he helps families take the first step towards resolving a family conflict. The show first aired in 2000 and more than 240 episodes have been produced. He also presented the quiz show De Grootste Royaltykenner van Nederland, together with Jeroen Snel, with questions about monarchs and royal families.

Van Leeuwen presented the 2014 television show Sterren van Bethlehem in which six Dutch celebrities travel to Israel. In 2018, he was the procession reporter in that year's edition of The Passion, a Dutch Passion Play held every Maundy Thursday since 2011. Van Leeuwen also appeared in a 2018 episode of the singing competition show It Takes 2. He was the first contestant to be eliminated.

He was scheduled to be the procession reporter in the 2020 edition of The Passion but that event was cancelled due to the COVID-19 pandemic. Van Leeuwen and Tineke Schouten were guests in an episode of the 2020 television show Het hek van de dam, a show about shepherding and conversations between the guests. He competed in the 2020 season of the photography television show Het Perfecte Plaatje in which contestants compete to create the best photo in various challenges.

Van Leeuwen presented the show Soep, sores en soelaas, in which he follows people with an addiction to drugs and/or alcohol. He appeared in a 2023 episode of the television series The Masked Singer.

In October 2024, he was the first recipient of the Bert van Leeuwen Prijs, an award by the EO and named after him, for his contributions to building connection in society. A street next to the EO office building in Hilversum was named after him. It also marked his forty-year anniversary in television as he first appeared on television in October 1984.

== Personal life ==
Van Leeuwen was born in The Hague, Netherlands as one of seven children. His son Laurens van Leeuwen is married to Dutch model Romee Strijd.

== Selected filmography ==
=== As presenter ===
- Het Familiediner
- De Grootste Royaltykenner van Nederland
- De Grote Bijbelquiz
- That's the Question
- Ik weet het beter
- De Pelgrimscode
- Sterren van Bethlehem (2014)
- Soep, sores en soelaas

=== As contestant ===
- It Takes 2 (2018)
- Het Perfecte Plaatje (2020)
- The Masked Singer (2023)

=== As himself ===
- Het hek van de dam (2020)
