= Paul Witteman =

Dutch journalist and television presenter

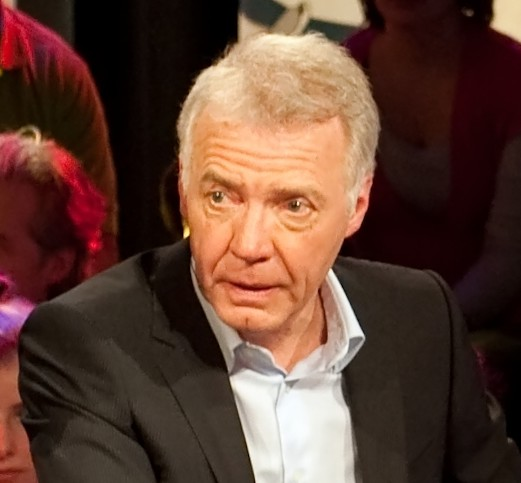
- Witteman in 2010
- Born: 14 October 1946 (age 79)
- Occupations: Journalist; Television presenter
- Known for: Het Lagerhuis; Pauw & Witteman; Podium Witteman

Paul Witteman (born 14 October 1946) is a Dutch journalist and television presenter. He is known for presenting multiple television shows, including the political interview show Buitenhof, the talk show Pauw & Witteman and Podium Witteman, a show about classical music.

== Career ==
Witteman presented eight seasons of the television show Podium Witteman, a show about classical music. Dieuwertje Blok and Floris Kortie succeeded him as presenters of the show and the show was renamed to Podium Klassiek.

Witteman is known for presenting the debate television show Het Lagerhuis with Marcel van Dam. He is also known for co-presenting both the interview show Woestijnruiters and the talk show Pauw & Witteman with Jeroen Pauw. He was one of the presenters of the political interview television show Buitenhof. He decided to stop presenting the show as both Buitenhof and Podium Witteman were filmed live on Sunday afternoon and this was difficult to combine. Journalist Hugo Logtenberg succeeded him as presenter of Buitenhof. Witteman also presented multiple seasons of the show De Meesterwerken, a show about art and culture.

Witteman was head of the jury for the 2014 Libris Literatuur Prijs, an annual award for Dutch-language novels. In 2018, he presented the two-part television series Uit Coma about people who awoke from a coma and about developments in the field of studying comas.

Witteman won the Ere Zilveren Nipkowschijf award for his entire oeuvre in 2022.

== Selected filmography ==
- Het Lagerhuis
- Woestijnruiters
- Pauw & Witteman (2006–2014)
- Uit Coma (2018)
- Podium Witteman
- De Meesterwerken
