= Astrid Joosten =

Dutch television presenter

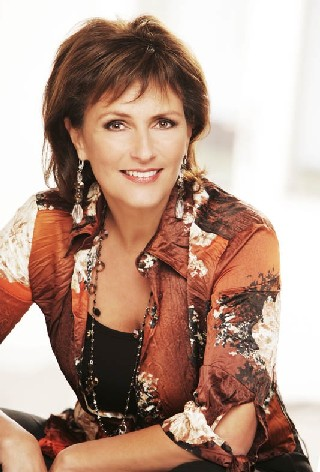
- Born: 22 March 1958 (age 67); Beverwijk, Netherlands
- Occupations: Announcer, presenter
- Years active: 1983–present
- Known for: 2 voor 12
- Notable work: BNNVARA

Astrid Maria Bernadette Joosten (born 22 March 1958) is a Dutch television personality and presenter. She is known for the magazine programme Jongbloed en Joosten, and presenting the quiz show Twee voor Twaalf. She also starred in the 2005 film Off Screen.

== Television presentations ==
Joosten has presented a series of programmes on Dutch television since 1988, including Jongbloed en Joosten, In het Nieuws, Gala Toon 75, De Show van Je Leven, De Verleiding, Twee voor Twaalf and Kanniewaarzijn.

In December 2022, she replaced Matthijs van Nieuwkerk as presenter of Wetenschappelijk Jaaroverzicht, a show about the scientific developments of that year.

== Awards ==
In April 2017, Joosten was honoured as a Knight of the Order of Orange-Nassau for her extensive work on Dutch television over the past 25 years and her commitment to various charities.

== Personal life ==
Joosten was married to Dutch television producer Willem Ennis, until his death from cancer in 2012. In 2022 she married Rob Peters.
