= Antoine Bodar =

Dutch priest, art historian and writer

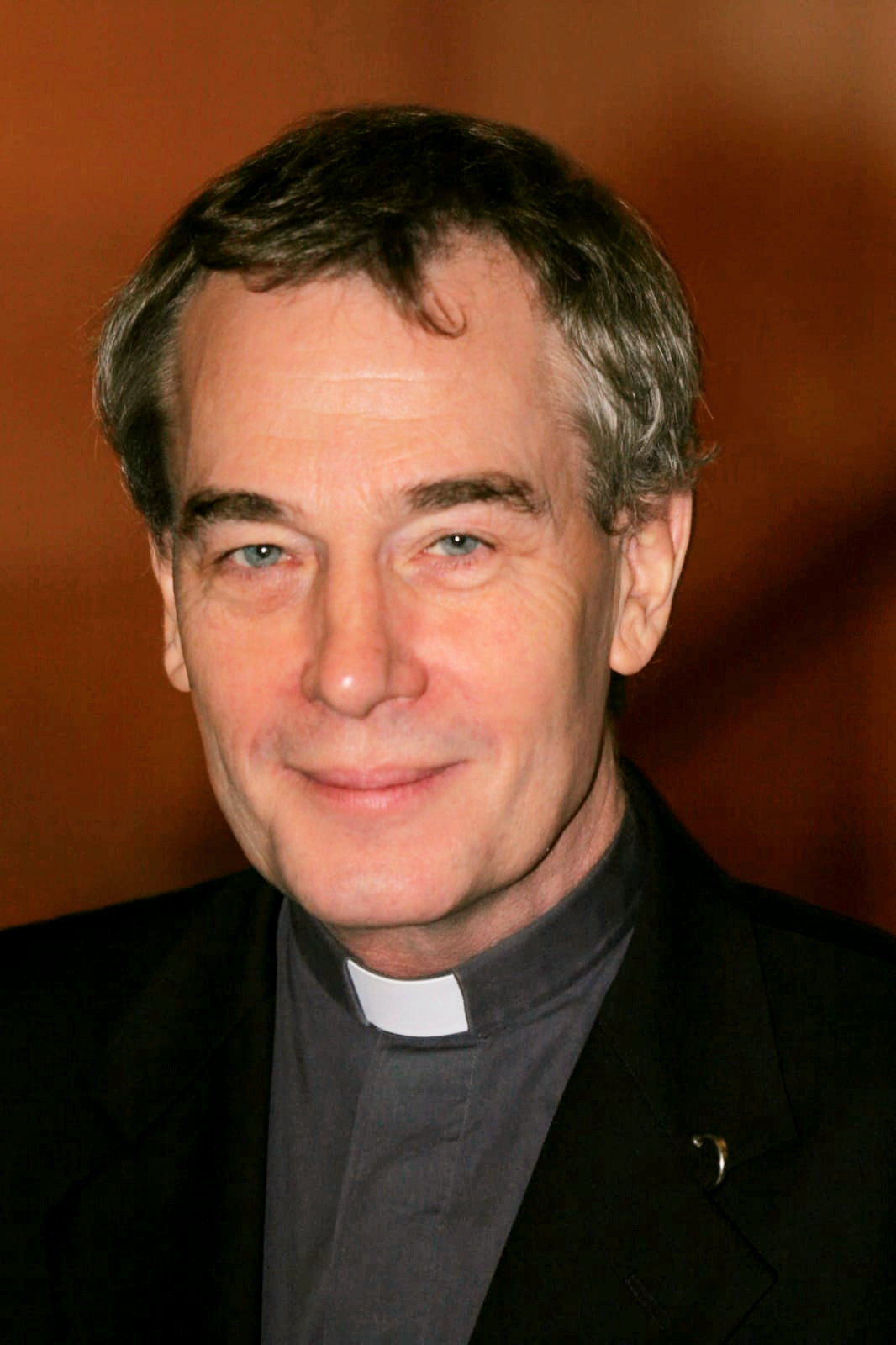
Fr. Antoine Bodar in 2020.

Antonius Petrus Lambertus "Antoine" Bodar (born 28 December 1944 in 's-Hertogenbosch) is a Dutch Roman Catholic priest, art historian, author of books in the field of culture and church and professor.

Bodar was initially known as a presenter of radio and television programs on KRO. He was then a lecturer at Leiden University and professor in Tilburg. Bodar was ordained a priest at a later age and continued to appear as a creator of his own programs and as a guest in those of others on radio and television. He has numerous books to his name.

== Books ==
- Liturgie in Traditie: Liturgie volgens Joseph Ratzinger/Benedictus XVI, 2022. ISBN 949326212X
- Vervulling in bekering, 2018.
- Droef gemoed: Nels Fahner in gesprek met Antoine Bodar over depressie, 2018.
- Eeuwigh gaat voor oogenblick: Antoine Bodar in gesprek met Paul Witteman, Adriaan Van Dis, Hilde Kieboom, Hans Wiegel en 12 anderen, 2017.
- Geborgen in traditie, 2016.
- Kerstverhalen -: gekozen door Antoine Bodar, 2014.
- Verkoren en veracht, 2011.
- Tot dienen geroepen, 2010.
- Uit de eeuwige stad, 2008.
- Romeinse brieven, 2007.
- Nochtans zal ik juichen, 2007.
- Ik droom mij Europa: inaugurale rede bij de aanvaarding van het ambt van bijzonder hoogleraar vanwege de Stichting Hieronymus met als leeropdracht ... de universiteit vanTilburg op 2 februari 2007, 2007.
- In zwakheid krachtig, 2004.
- Klokkenluider van Sint Jan, 2004.
- Weten Waar de Muze Woont, 1998.
- Drinken van de beker, 1997.
- Geheim van het geloof, 1996.
- Eeuwigh gaat voor Oogenblick, 1996.
- Gezellin van de Stilte, 1996.
- Wandelen met de Heer, 1994.
