= Jeroen Pauw =

Dutch journalist and television presenter

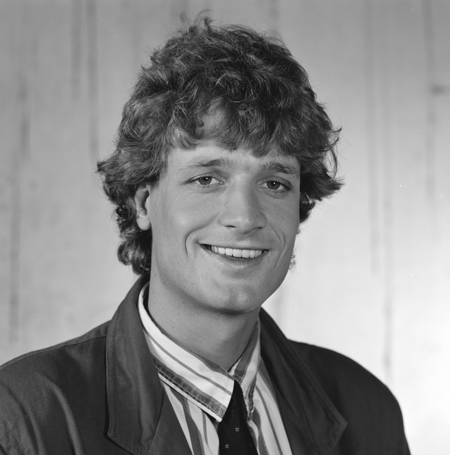
- Jeroen Pauw (1989)
- Born: 15 August 1960 (age 66); Hilversum, Netherlands
- Years active: 1979–present

Jeroen Pauw (born 15 August 1960) is a Dutch journalist and television presenter. He is known for being the lead presenter of the evening editions of RTL Nieuws from 1989 to 2000, as well as presenting the talk show Pauw & Witteman with Paul Witteman and his own talk show Pauw.

== Career ==
Pauw and Loretta Schrijver became news anchors of the show RTL Nieuws in 1989. He also presented the talk show Pauw & Witteman with Paul Witteman for eight years. The last episode of the show aired in May 2014.

In 2008, Pauw presented the first season of the television show 5 jaar later in which he interviews people based on an interview that was recorded with each guest five years earlier. He presented the show each year until 2017. He won the Sonja Barend Award 2014 for his interview with Fleur Agema in the show. In 2017, Pauw won the TV-Beeld award for the show. In 2018, the show moved from broadcasting organization NTR to the commercial channel RTL 4 and Beau van Erven Dorens became presenter of the show. Pauw was one of the guests in this season of the show.

From 2014 to 2019 he presented the talk show Pauw. In 2015, he won the TV-Beeld award for Pauw in the category Best current affairs program for his interview with minister of foreign affairs Frans Timmermans. He won the 2019 Ere Zilveren Nipkowschijf and he received the award while presenting an episode of his talk show. The last episode of Pauw aired in December 2019. Pauw played a role in the 2019 film XIII: De 24-uurs film van Kalvijn, a film made by YouTuber Kalvijn (Kelvin Boerma).

Pauw became one of the presenters of the talk show Op1 in 2020. He presented the 2020 television show Pauw komt binnen which was filmed in multiple locations in the Netherlands rather than in a studio. Since 2020, he presents the show Het Laatste Woord in which he interviews a Dutch celebrity in each episode and the episode only airs after the person's death.

In 2024, Pauw replaced Khalid Kasem in the talk show Khalid & Sophie and the show was renamed to Sophie & Jeroen. Sophie Hilbrand was the other presenter of the show. From 2024 to May 2025, they presented the talk show Bar Laat. The talk show Pauw & De Wit is the successor of Bar Laat, with Jeroen Pauw and Tim de Wit as presenters, and the first episode aired in September 2025. They alternate as presenters of the show and they presented the show together in the lead up to the 2025 Dutch general election. Roos Moggré also presented the show for two weeks in February 2026 and the show's name changed to Pauw, De Wit & Moggré.

In 2000, Pauw and Peter Adrichem founded the television production company TVBV. The company produced multiple television shows, including the talk shows Pauw, Op1 and HLF8. The company ceased operations in 2024.

== Selected filmography ==
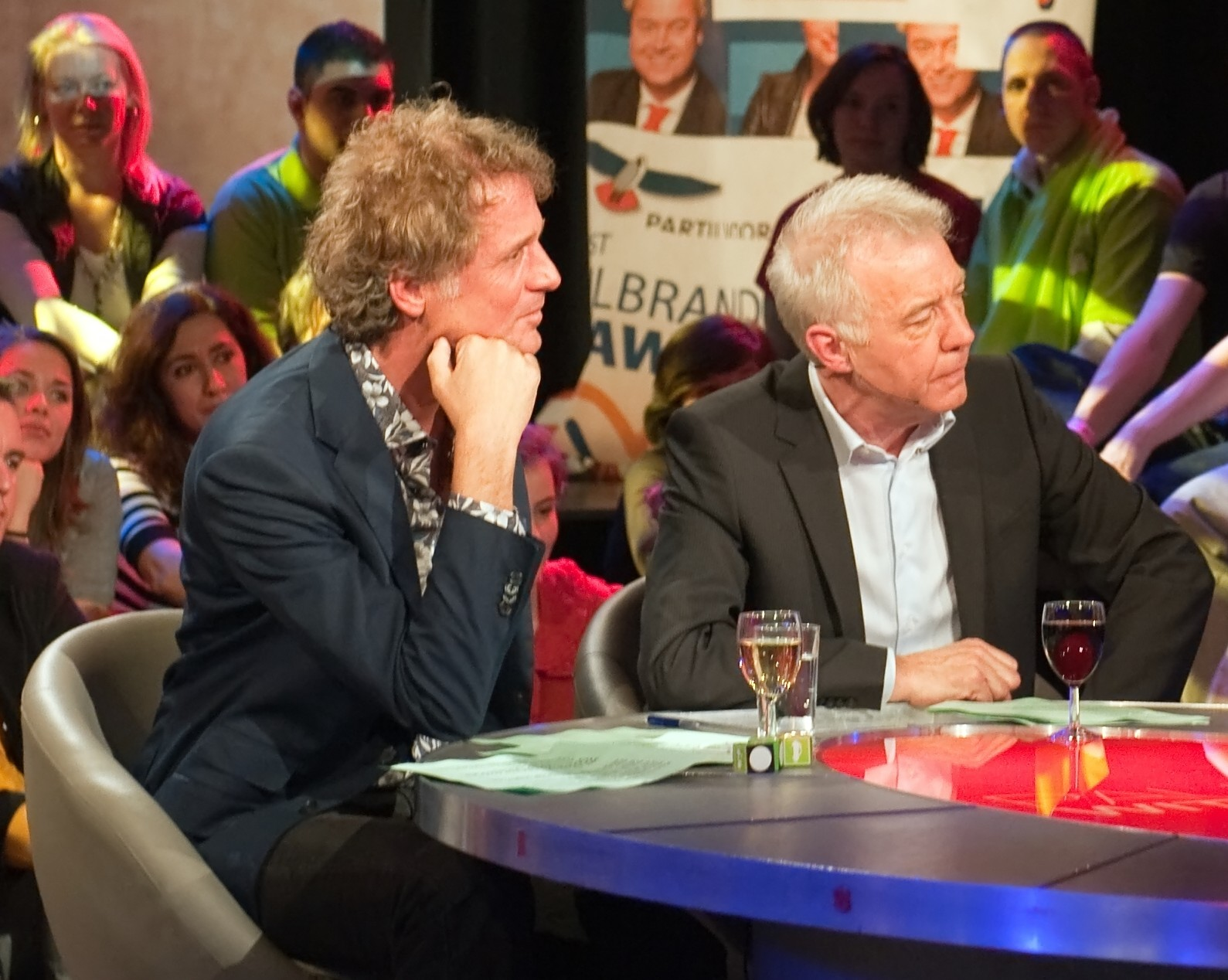
Pauw and Paul Witteman during an episode of the talk show Pauw & Witteman, 2010.

=== As presenter ===
- RTL Nieuws (1989–2000)
- Pauw & Witteman (2006–2014)
- 5 jaar later (2008–2017)
- Pauw (2014–2019)
- Pauw komt binnen (2020)
- Het Laatste Woord (2020 – present)
- Sophie & Jeroen (2024)
- Bar Laat (2024–2025)
- Pauw & De Wit (2025 – present)

=== As actor ===
- XIII: De 24-uurs film van Kalvijn (2019)
