= Evangelische Omroep =

Dutch Evangelical broadcasting association

- Type: Public broadcasting association
- Branding: Evangelical Protestant
- Country: Netherlands
- First air date: 1 April 1970
- Founded: 21 April 1967
- Motto: Geloof, hoop en liefde (lit. 'Faith, hope and love')
- Key people: Arjan Lock (CEO)
- Official website: Official website

Evangelische Omroep (transl. 'Evangelical Broadcasting [Association]'), shortened to EO, is a public broadcaster within the Dutch public broadcasting system. Founded in 1967, it positions itself as an evangelical Protestant broadcaster with the objective to promote the Christian gospel by means of radio and television broadcasts.

== History ==
The EO was founded in 1967 by members of Evangelical churches, dissatisfied with the course of NCRV and wanting to put more emphasis on evangelism. By 1970, it reached the threshold of 15,000 members required to enter the public broadcasting system as an aspiring broadcaster. Despite struggeling to gain members, it attained the required 100,000 members by 1972, and was granted recognition as a C-status broadcaster by Minister Piet Engels.

The EO's programmes were not aimed exclusively at the Christian population but were explicitly evangelising in character. In its early years, the broadcaster produced television programmes without professional experience or trained staff. Over time, however, the quality of EO productions improved markedly, particularly in nature documentaries and children's programming, which attracted strong audiences. This development continued into the 1980s, when growing secularisation in Dutch society prompted the EO to emphasise its evangelising mission even more strongly, achieving considerable success.

In the 1990s, the organisation evolved further into a modern public broadcaster: it began broadcasting on Sundays, collaborated with Joop van den Ende on its first drama series, and in 1992 launched the current‑affairs programme 2 Vandaag in cooperation with TROS and Veronica. While still being presented as a BBC documentary, The Life of Mammals series was edited to remove references to evolution, among others, and profanity is regularly edited out of bought-in drama series. In 2009, leading presenter and former director Andries Knevel apologised after stating that it was possible for a religious person not to believe in a literal interpretation of the biblical creation story. In 2009, EO television presenter Arie Boomsma was suspended for three months after appearing partially undressed in gay magazine L'Homo. Later that year, following uproar from its members, EO cancelled a planned television show, Loopt een man over het water... ('A Man Walks Over the Water...'), in which non-Christian comedians were to create short sketches about Jesus Christ. After the cancellation, Boomsma, who was to host the show, left the EO and joined the Catholic broadcasting association KRO.

== Programmes ==
- De Kist (transl. 'The Coffin')
- Het Familiediner (transl. 'The Family Dinner')
- Game Over in Littleton

== Presenters ==
(Former) presenters of the EO include:

- Kefah Allush
- Tijs van den Brink
- Renze Klamer
- Andries Knevel
- Bert van Leeuwen
