= Tijs van den Brink =

Dutch politician and journalist

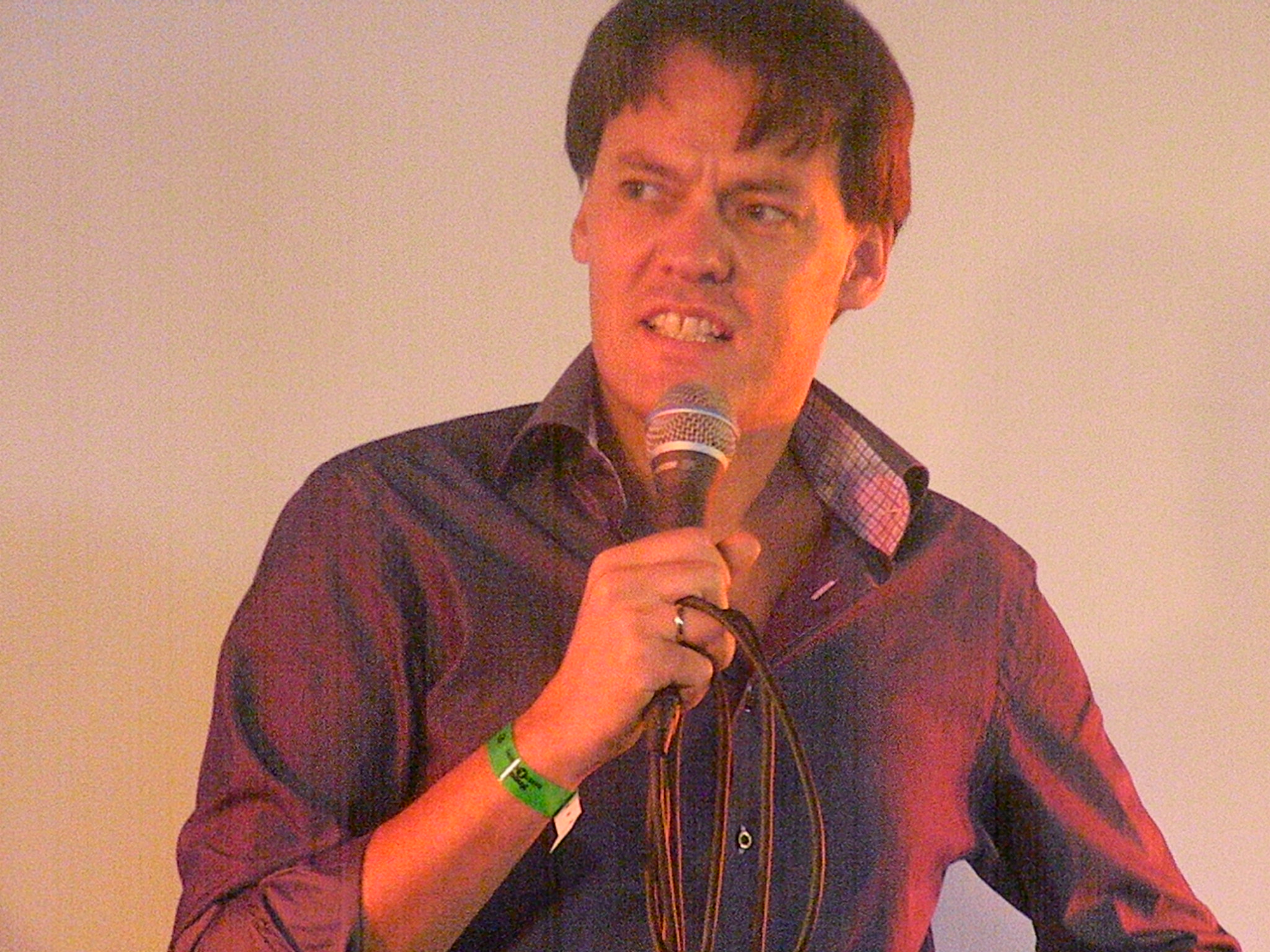
- Tijs van den Brink in 2010

Member of the House of Representatives
- Incumbent
- Assumed office 12 November 2025

Personal details
- Born: 5 August 1970 (age 56)
- Party: Christian Democratic Appeal

Tijs van den Brink (born 5 August 1970) is a Dutch politician and journalist who was elected to the Dutch House of Representatives in the 2025 general election. A member of the Christian Democratic Appeal, he was ranked 11th on the party list for the election and the CDA won 18 seats. Van den Brink was sworn into office on 12 November 2025.
