= 2002 in Dutch television =

List of years in Dutch television
- … 1992; 1993; 1994; 1995; 1996; 1997; 1998; 1999; 2000; 2001; 2002; 2003; 2004; 2005; 2006; 2007; 2008; 2009; 2010; 2011; 2012 …
- Art; Archaeology; Architecture; Literature; Music; Philosophy; Science; +...

This is a list of Dutch television related events from 2002.

== Events ==
- 27 April - Valerie Dwarkasing, performing as Alicia Keys, wins the eighteenth and final series of Soundmixshow.
- 1 November - Idols, the Dutch version of Pop Idol debuts on RTL 4.
- 23 December - Jeanette Godefroy wins the fourth series of Big Brother.

== Debuts ==
- 1 November - Idols (2002-2008, 2016–present)

== Television shows ==
=== 1950s ===
- NOS Journaal (1956–present)

=== 1970s ===
- Sesamstraat (1976–present)

=== 1980s ===
- Jeugdjournaal (1981–present)
- Het Klokhuis (1988–present)

=== 1990s ===
- Goede tijden, slechte tijden (1990–present)
- Big Brother (1999-2006)
- De Club van Sinterklaas (1999-2009)

== Ending this year ==
- Soundmixshow (1985-2002)
- Monte Carlo (1998-2002)

== Networks and services ==
=== Launches ===
Network	Type	Launch date	Notes	Source
E!	Cable television	2 December		

=== Conversions and rebrandings ===
Old network name	New network name	Type	Conversion Date	Notes	Source
[[]]		Cable and satellite			

=== Closures ===
Network	Type	End date	Notes	Sources
[[]]	Cable and satellite			

== See also ==
- 2002 in the Netherlands
