= 2000 in Dutch television =

This is a list of Dutch television related events from 2000.

== Events ==
- 27 February - Linda Wagenmakers is selected to represent Netherlands at the 2000 Eurovision Song Contest with her song "No Goodbyes". She is selected to be the forty-second Dutch Eurovision entry during Nationaal Songfestival held at Ahoy in Rotterdam.
- 23 April - Bart Schwertmann wins the sixteenth series of Soundmixshow, performing as Ian Gillan.
- 30 December - Bianca Hagenbeek wins the second series of Big Brother. This was the last series to be broadcast on Veronica.

== Debuts ==
=== International ===
- (Japan) / (France) Saban's Adventures of the Little Mermaid (Fox Kids)

== Television shows ==
=== 1950s ===
- NOS Journaal (1956–present)

=== 1970s ===
- Sesamstraat (1976–present)

=== 1980s ===
- Jeugdjournaal (1981–present)
- Soundmixshow (1985-2002)
- Het Klokhuis (1988–present)

=== 1990s ===
- Goede tijden, slechte tijden (1990–present)
- Goudkust (1996-2001)
- Monte Carlo (1998-2002)
- Big Brother (1999-2006)
- De Club van Sinterklaas (1999-2009)

== Networks and services ==
=== Launches ===
Network	Type	Launch date	Notes	Source
DanceTrippinTV	Cable television	Unknown		
CineNova	Cable television	18 May		

=== Conversions and rebrandings ===
Old network name	New network name	Type	Conversion Date	Notes	Source
MTV	MTV	Cable and satellite	12 September		

== See also ==
- 2000 in the Netherlands
