= 2001 in Dutch television =

This is a list of Dutch television related events from 2000.

== Events ==
- 3 March - Michelle is selected to represent Netherlands at the 2001 Eurovision Song Contest with her song "Out On My Own". She is selected to be the forty-third Dutch Eurovision entry during Nationaal Songfestival 2001 held at Ahoy in Rotterdam.
- 2 September - Arno Woesthoff wins ƒ10 million in a game show Miljoenenjacht (Hunt for Millions). It was the only time in this game show the bonus round was a quiz-based instead of a luck-based round (which would later be internationally known as Deal or No Deal) first adopted in the following year; at about €4,537,801.68 or US$5.5 million, he also became the biggest winner in any game shows worldwide till this day, and also the biggest primetime game show winnings record in general.
- 30 December - Sandy Boots wins series 3 of Big Brother. This was the first series to be broadcast on Yorin.
- Unknown - Mary Amora, performing as Tina Turner, wins the seventeenth series of Soundmixshow.

== Debuts ==
- January 31: SpongeBob SquarePants

== Television shows ==
=== 1950s ===
- NOS Journaal (1956–present)

=== 1970s ===
- Sesamstraat (1976–present)

=== 1980s ===
- Jeugdjournaal (1981–present)
- Soundmixshow (1985-2002)
- Het Klokhuis (1988–present)

=== 1990s ===
- Goede tijden, slechte tijden (1990–present)
- Monte Carlo (1998-2002)
- Big Brother (1999-2006)
- De Club van Sinterklaas (1999-2009)

== Ending this year ==
- Goudkust (1996-2001)

== Networks and services ==
=== Launches ===
Network	Type	Launch date	Notes	Source
MGM Channel	Cable television	Unknown		

=== Conversions and rebrandings ===
Old network name	New network name	Type	Conversion Date	Notes	Source
Veronica	Yorin	Cable and satellite	2 April		
VH1 Export	VH1 Europe	Cable and satellite	Unknown		

== See also ==
- 2001 in the Netherlands
