= 1999 in Dutch television =

This is a list of Dutch television related events from 1999.

== Events ==
- 14 March - Marlayne is selected to represent Netherlands at the 1999 Eurovision Song Contest with her song "One Good Reason". She is selected to be the forty-first Dutch Eurovision entry during Nationaal Songfestival held at NOS Studios in Hilversum.
- 16 September - The television reality show Big Brother debuts on Veronica.
- 12 October - Erna Otte-Hemmink, performing as Emma Shapplin wins the fifteenth series of Soundmixshow
- 30 December - The first series of Big Brother is won by Bart Spring in 't Veld.

== Debuts ==
- 16 September - Big Brother (1999-2006)
- 1 November - De Club van Sinterklaas (1999-2009)

== Television shows ==
=== 1950s ===
- NOS Journaal (1956–present)

=== 1970s ===
- Sesamstraat (1976–present)

=== 1980s ===
- Jeugdjournaal (1981–present)
- Soundmixshow (1985-2002)
- Het Klokhuis (1988–present)

=== 1990s ===
- Goede tijden, slechte tijden (1990–present)
- Goudkust (1996-2001)
- Monte Carlo (1998-2002)

== Networks and services ==
=== Launches ===
Network	Type	Launch date	Notes	Source
Net5	Cable television	1 March		
Extreme Sports Channel	Cable television	1 May		
VH1 Export	Cable television	June		
Reality TV	Cable television	1 December		

=== Conversions and rebrandings ===
Old network name	New network name	Type	Conversion Date	Notes	Source
TNT Classic Movies	Turner Classic Movies	Cable television	15 October		

== See also ==
- 1999 in the Netherlands
