= 1964 in Dutch television =

This is a list of Dutch television related events from 1964.

== Television shows ==
=== 1950s ===
- NOS Journaal (1956–present)
- Pipo de Clown (1958-1980)

=== 1960s ===
- Stiefbeen en Zoon (1964-1971)

== Ending this year ==
- 20 April – Dappere Dodo

== Networks and services ==
=== Launches ===
Network	Type	Launch date	Notes	Source
Nederland 2	Cable television	1 October		

=== Conversions and rebrandings ===
Old network name	New network name	Type	Conversion Date	Notes	Source
NTS	Nederland 1	Cable and satellite	1 October		

== Births ==
- 31 March - Caroline Tensen, TV presenter
- 8 July - Linda de Mol, TV presenter & actress
