= 1992 in Dutch television =

This is a list of Dutch television related events from 1992.

== Events ==
- 5 January - The first episode of Purno de Purno is broadcast.
- 29 March - Humphrey Campbell is selected to represent Netherlands at the 1992 Eurovision Song Contest with his song "Wijs me de weg". He is selected to be the thirty-fifth Dutch Eurovision entry during Nationaal Songfestival held at NOS Studios in Hilversum.
- 15 April - Hedy d'Ancona suggested in a letter sent to the House of Representatives that the omroeps on Nederland 2 and Nederland 3 should be exchanged for a more balanced airtime, namely EO joining TROS and Veronica on Nederland 3 and VARA and VPRO moving to Nederland 3.
- Unknown - Nhelly Dela Rosa wins the eighth series of Soundmixshow, performing as Shirley Bassey.

== Television shows ==
=== 1950s ===
- NOS Journaal (1956–present)

=== 1970s ===
- Sesamstraat (1976–present)

=== 1980s ===
- Jeugdjournaal (1981–present)
- Soundmixshow (1985-2002)
- Het Klokhuis (1988–present)

=== 1990s ===
- Goede tijden, slechte tijden (1990–present)
- Purno de Purno (1992–2007)

== Networks and services ==
=== Launches ===
Network	Type	Launch date	Notes	Source
AT5	Cable television	1 April		
Arte	Cable television	30 May		
CMT Europe	Cable television	October		

== Births ==
- 24 February - Britt Dekker, television presenter

== Deaths ==
- 16 July - Bert Brugman
