= 1997 in Dutch television =

This is a list of Dutch television related events from 1997.

== Events ==
- 23 November - Mary Ann Morales wins the thirteenth series of Soundmixshow, performing as Lea Salonga.

== Debuts ==
=== International ===
- 11 September – (France) / (Canada) / (Belgium) Billy the Cat

== Television shows ==
=== 1950s ===
- NOS Journaal (1956–present)

=== 1970s ===
- Sesamstraat (1976–present)

=== 1980s ===
- Jeugdjournaal (1981–present)
- Soundmixshow (1985-2002)
- Het Klokhuis (1988–present)

=== 1990s ===
- Goede tijden, slechte tijden (1990–present)
- Goudkust (1996-2001)

== Networks and services ==
=== Launches ===
Network	Type	Launch date	Notes	Source
Fox Kids	Cable television	2 August		

=== Conversions and rebrandings ===
Old network name	New network name	Type	Conversion Date	Notes	Source
Cartoon Network Europe	Cartoon Network	Cable television	12 July		
Filmnet	Canal+	Cable television	1 August		

=== Closures ===
Network	Type	End date	Notes	Sources
K-T.V.	Cable television	Unknown		
Euro 7	Cable television	28 March		
