= 1963 in Dutch television =

This is a list of Dutch television related events from 1963.

== Debuts ==
- 11 October – Stiefbeen en Zoon

== Television shows ==
=== 1950s ===
- Dappere Dodo(1955–1964)
- NOS Journaal (1956–present)
- Pipo de Clown (1958–1980)

== Births ==
- 23 April - Rolf Wouters, TV presenter
- 12 May - Manon Thomas, TV presenter
- 16 May - Bas Westerweel, TV presenter
- 18 September - Frits Sissing, TV presenter
