= 2004 in Dutch television =

This is a list of Dutch television related events from 2004.

== Events ==
- 22 February - Re-union are selected to represent Netherlands at the 2004 Eurovision Song Contest with their song "Without You". They are selected to be the forty-fifth Dutch Eurovision entry during Nationaal Songfestival held at Pepsi Stage Theatre in Amsterdam.
- 1 May - Boris Titulaer wins the second series of Idols. His debut single "When You Think of Me" reaches number one in the Dutch Top 40 three weeks later.

== Television shows ==
=== 1950s ===
- NOS Journaal (1956–present)

=== 1970s ===
- Sesamstraat (1976–present)

=== 1980s ===
- Jeugdjournaal (1981–present)
- Het Klokhuis (1988–present)

=== 1990s ===
- Goede tijden, slechte tijden (1990–present)
- Big Brother (1999-2006)
- De Club van Sinterklaas (1999-2009)

=== 2000s ===
- Idols (2002-2008, 2016–present)

== Networks and services ==
=== Launches ===
Network	Type	Launch date	Notes	Source
Animal Planet	Cable television	16 February		
VH1 Classic	Cable television	30 November		
Holland Doc 24	Cable television	1 December		
Journaal 24	Cable television	1 December		

== See also ==
- 2004 in the Netherlands
