= 1998 in Dutch television =

This is a list of Dutch television related events from 1998.

== Events ==
- 8 March - 1996 Soundmixshow winner Edsilia Rombley is selected to represent Netherlands at the 1998 Eurovision Song Contest with her song "Hemel en aarde". She is selected to be the fortieth Dutch Eurovision entry during Nationaal Songfestival held at RAI Congresgebouw in Amsterdam.
- 17 October - Cherwin Muringen wins the fourteenth series of Soundmixshow, performing as Seal.

== Debuts ==
- 10 October - Monte Carlo (1998–2002)

== Television shows ==
=== 1950s ===
- NOS Journaal (1956–present)

=== 1970s ===
- Sesamstraat (1976–present)

=== 1980s ===
- Jeugdjournaal (1981–present)
- Soundmixshow (1985–2002)
- Het Klokhuis (1988–present)

=== 1990s ===
- Goede tijden, slechte tijden (1990–present)
- Goudkust (1996–2001)

== Networks and services ==
=== Launches ===
Network	Type	Launch date	Notes	Source
Mezzo TV	Cable television	21 March		
13th Street	Cable television	30 May		
National Geographic	Cable television	1 July		
Discovery Science	Cable television	1 October		
Discovery Travel & Living	Cable television	1 October		
Discovery Civilisation Channel	Cable television	2 October		

=== Closures ===
Network	Type	End date	Notes	Sources
CMT Europe	Cable television	31 March		
