= 2001 in the Netherlands =

- Decades: 1980s; 1990s; 2000s; 2010s; 2020s
- See also: Other events of 2001; History of the Netherlands

This article lists some of the events that took place in the Netherlands in 2001.

== Incumbents ==
- Monarch: Beatrix
- Prime Minister: Wim Kok

== Events ==
- 1 January – Fire at a New Years party in a bar in Volendam kills 14 young people and injures 200
- 18 January – Fire at Schiphol airport leads to chaos
- 26 January – Suspect of fireworks explosion in Enschede in May 2000 arrested
- 6 February – Foreign minister Van Aartsen calls off visit to the People's Republic of China because of human rights
- 8 February – Eight Hells Angels are arrested in their club house in Amsterdam
- 14 February – Government Information Service declares that Queen Beatrix's second son Friso is not homosexual
- 14 February – The creator of the Anna Kournikova computer virus turns himself in
- 21 March – First case of foot and mouth disease discovered
- 30 March – Engagement of Crown Prince Willem Alexander and Máxima Zorreguieta announced

== Arts and literature ==
- 26 March – Michael Dudok de Wit wins an Academy Award (Short film/animated) for Father and Daughter

== Sports ==
- 11 February – Rintje Ritsma wins the world all-round speed skating title.
- 21 April – FC Den Bosch wins the Eerste Divisie.
- 28 April – Erik Dekker wins the Amstel Gold Race.
- 6 May – PSV Eindhoven secures the Dutch football title in the Eredivisie by beating SC Heerenveen 3–0.
- 24 May – FC Twente wins the KNVB Cup after beating PSV Eindhoven in the penalty shootout
- 16 June – HC Den Bosch clinches the Dutch men's field hockey title by beating Oranje Zwart of Eindhoven in the play-offs.
- 23 June – The women of HC Den Bosch clinch the Dutch women's field hockey title by beating HC Rotterdam in the play-offs.
- 26 August – The women of Argentina beat the Netherlands to win the Champions Trophy, held at the Wagener stadium in Amstelveen.
- 21 October – Driss El Himer wins the Amsterdam Marathon

== Births ==
- 7 February – Cheick Touré, Soccer player
- 15 April – Anna van Lippe-Biesterfeld van Vollenhoven, daughter of Prince Maurits and Princess Marilène
- 30 August – Daan Hartemink, Malaysian footballer
- 19 November – Aidan Mikdad, Pianist

== Deaths ==
=== January ===
- 8 – Johan van der Keuken (1938), documentary film-maker

=== March ===
- 1 – Hannie Termeulen Swimmer
- 12 – Victor Westhoff Botanist
- 21 – Wim van der Kroft Canoeist

=== April ===
- 4 – Wim van der Linden
- 18 – Hans Dirk de Vries Reilingh Geographer
- 20 – Steven Blaisse Rower
- 29 – Barend Biesheuvel 44th Prime Minister of the Netherlands

=== May ===
- 27 – Bram van Leeuwen Entrepreneur

=== June ===
- 11 – Cornelis Verhoeven Philosopher and Writer
- 27 – Kees Stip Poet

=== July ===
- 9 – Arie van Vliet Cyclist
- 11 – Herman Brood Musician
- 12 – Ron Kroon Swimmer
- 27 – Piet Bromberg Field hockey player
- 31 – Joris Tjebbes Swimmer

=== August ===
- 4 – Jan van der Jagt Politician
- 6 – Wina Born Culinary journalist
- 8 – Noud van Melis Soccer player
- 20 – Sylvia Millecam Actress and comedian
- 23 – Herman Fokker Politician
- 28 – Theo Blankenauw Cyclist

=== September ===
- 7 – Jan Baas Baseball player

=== October ===
- 5 – Egbert van 't Oever Speed skater and Coach
- 22 – Ed Vijent Soccer player
- 28 – Gerard Hengeveld Pianist and Composer

=== November ===
- 29 – Jan van Beekum Composer

=== December ===
- 1 – Stan Haag Radio host
- 2 – Max Rood Politician
- 14 – Elisabeth Augustin Writer and Poet
- 19 – Hans Warren Poet
- 23 – Jelle Zijlstra 42nd Prime Minister of the Netherlands

== See also ==
- 2001 in Dutch television
