= 1993 in Dutch television =

This is a list of Dutch television related events from 1993.

== Events ==
- 2 October – RTL 4 launches its sister channel RTL 5 at 6pm with an introductory programme; there was also a launch ceremony later that evening (Saturdaynight Five).
- Unknown - Ellen Fransz, performing as Whitney Houston wins the ninth series of Soundmixshow.

== Television shows ==
=== 1950s ===
- NOS Journaal (1956–present)

=== 1970s ===
- Sesamstraat (1976–present)

=== 1980s ===
- Jeugdjournaal (1981–present)
- Soundmixshow (1985-2002)
- Het Klokhuis (1988–present)

=== 1990s ===
- Goede tijden, slechte tijden (1990–present)

== Networks and services ==
=== Launches ===
| Network | Type | Launch date | Notes | Source |
|---|---|---|---|---|
| K-T.V. | Cable television | Unknown | | |
| Euronews | Cable television | 10 January | | |
| Cartoon Network Europe | Cable television | 17 September | | |
| TNT Classic Movies | Cable television | 17 September | | |
| RTL V | Cable television | 2 October | | |

=== Closures ===
| Network | Type | End date | Notes | Sources |
|---|---|---|---|---|
| Screensport | Cable and satellite | 1 March | | |
