= 1995 in Dutch television =

This is a list of Dutch television related events from 1995.

== Events ==
- 28 August - SBS6 launches.
- 31 August - Exactly 21 years after being admitted into the Dutch public broadcasting system, Veronica made its final broadcast on Nederland 2 with its final programme, Veronica Goodbye, a documentary on its history up until that point, as it prepared its entrance in the private sector.
- 1 September - Veronica launches as a standalone channel.
- Unknown - Arno Kolenbrander wins the eleventh series of Soundmixshow, performing as Simon Bowman.

== Television shows ==
=== 1950s ===
- NOS Journaal (1956–present)

=== 1970s ===
- Sesamstraat (1976–present)

=== 1980s ===
- Jeugdjournaal (1981–present)
- Soundmixshow (1985-2002)
- Het Klokhuis (1988–present)

=== 1990s ===
- Goede tijden, slechte tijden (1990–present)

== Networks and services ==
=== Launches ===
| Network | Type | Launch date | Notes | Source |
|---|---|---|---|---|
| Hallmark Channel | Cable television | June | | |
| BBC News | Cable television | 16 January | | |
| BBC Prime | Cable television | 30 January | | |
| European Business News | Cable television | 27 February | | |
| TMF6 | Cable television | 1 May | | |
| Veronica TV | Cable television | 1 May | | |
| The Box | Cable television | June | | |
| SBS6 | Cable television | 28 August | | |
| Veronica | Cable television | 1 September | | |
| VTV | Cable television | 2 October | | |
| History Channel | Cable television | 1 November | | |

== Births ==
- 27 March – Monica Geuze

== Deaths ==
| Date | Name | Age | Cinematic Credibility |
|---|---|---|---|
| 8 October | Piet te Nuyl, Jr. | 71 | Dutch television presenter |
