= 2003 in Dutch television =

This is a list of Dutch television related events from 2003.

== Events ==
- 1 March - Esther Hart is selected to represent Netherlands at the 2003 Eurovision Song Contest with her song "One More Night". She is selected to be the forty-fourth Dutch Eurovision entry during Nationaal Songfestival held at Ahoy in Rotterdam.
- 9 March - Jamai Loman wins the first series of Idols.
- March - Release date of Jamai Loman's debut single, "Step Right Up".

== Television shows ==
=== 1950s ===
- NOS Journaal (1956–present)

=== 1970s ===
- Sesamstraat (1976–present)

=== 1980s ===
- Jeugdjournaal (1981–present)
- Het Klokhuis (1988–present)

=== 1990s ===
- Goede tijden, slechte tijden (1990–present)
- Big Brother (1999-2006)
- De Club van Sinterklaas (1999-2009)

=== 2000s ===
- Idols (2002-2008, 2016–present)

== Networks and services ==
=== Launches ===
Network	Type	Launch date	Notes	Source
Discovery Channel	Cable television	12 April		
Nickelodeon	Cable television	14 July		
ESPN Classic	Cable television	December		

=== Conversions and rebrandings ===
Old network name	New network name	Type	Conversion Date	Notes	Source
[[]]		Cable and satellite			

=== Closures ===
Network	Type	End date	Notes	Sources
Kindernet	Cable and satellite	1 September		

== See also ==
- 2003 in the Netherlands
