= 2008 in Dutch television =

This is a list of Dutch television related events from 2008.

== Events ==
- 1 March – Nikki Kerkhof wins the fourth series of Idols.
- 30 May – 14-year-old contortionist Daniëlle Bubberman wins the first series of Holland's Got Talent.

== Debuts ==
- 28 March – Holland's Got Talent (2008–present)

== Television shows ==
=== 1950s ===
- NOS Journaal (1956–present)

=== 1970s ===
- Sesamstraat (1976–present)

=== 1980s ===
- Jeugdjournaal (1981–present)
- Het Klokhuis (1988–present)

=== 1990s ===
- Goede tijden, slechte tijden (1990–present)
- De Club van Sinterklaas (1999–2009)

=== 2000s ===
- Dancing with the Stars (2005–2009)
- X Factor (2006–present)

== Ending this year ==
- Idols (2002–2008, 2016–present)

== Networks and services ==
=== Launches ===
Network	Type	Launch date	Notes	Source
RTV-7	Cable television	April		
JimJam	Cable television	1 April		
OutTV	Cable television	2 April		
Eredivisie Live	Cable television	29 August		
Comedy Central Family	Cable television	1 October		
Film1 Action	Cable television	1 October		

=== Conversions and rebrandings ===
Old network name	New network name	Type	Conversion Date	Notes	Source
TMF Party	TMF Dance	Cable television	Unknown		
BBC News	BBC News World	Cable television	21 April		

=== Closures ===
Network	Type	End date	Notes	Sources
[[]]	Cable and satellite			

== See also ==
- 2008 in the Netherlands
