= List of 2009 box office number-one films in the Netherlands =

This is a list of films which have placed number one at the weekend box office in the Netherlands during 2009.

== Number-one films ==
| † | This implies the highest-grossing movie of the year. |

| # | Weekend End Date | Film | Total Weekend Gross | Notes |
|---|---|---|---|---|
| 1 | January 4, 2009 | Winter in Wartime (Oorlogswinter) | $4,590,507 | Netherlands/Belgium |
| 2 | January 11, 2009 | Yes Man | $2,799,939 | |
| 3 | January 18, 2009 | Yes Man | $3,018,130 | |
| 4 | January 25, 2009 | Valkyrie | $3,114,209 | |
| 5 | February 1, 2009 | The Curious Case of Benjamin Button | $3,054,138 | |
| 6 | February 8, 2009 | The Curious Case of Benjamin Button | $3,118,533 | |
| 7 | February 15, 2009 | The Curious Case of Benjamin Button | $3,541,998 | |
| 8 | February 22, 2009 | Bolt | $3,609,996 | (animated film) |
| 9 | March 1, 2009 | Slumdog Millionaire | $3,450,447 | |
| 10 | March 8, 2009 | Watchmen | $2,701,373 | |
| 11 | March 15, 2009 | Confessions of a Shopaholic | $2,604,331 | |
| 12 | March 22, 2009 | Confessions of a Shopaholic | $2,183,277 | |
| 13 | March 29, 2009 | Bride Wars | $2,325,508 | |
| 14 | April 5, 2009 | Fast & Furious | $2,857,518 | |
| 15 | April 12, 2009 | Fast & Furious | $2,474,197 | |
| 16 | April 19, 2009 | Fast & Furious | $1,690,424 | |
| 17 | April 26, 2009 | 17 Again | $1,780,848 | |
| 18 | May 3, 2009 | X-Men Origins: Wolverine | $5,108,913 | |
| 19 | May 10, 2009 | Star Trek | $1,996,773 | |
| 20 | May 17, 2009 | Angels & Demons | $2,959,244 | |
| 21 | May 24, 2009 | Angels & Demons | $3,588,411 | |
| 22 | May 31, 2009 | Angels & Demons | $1,956,569 | |
| 23 | June 7, 2009 | Terminator Salvation: The Future Begins | $2,577,011 | |
| 24 | June 14, 2009 | The Hangover | $2,430,205 | |
| 25 | June 21, 2009 | The Hangover | $2,262,750 | |
| 26 | June 28, 2009 | Transformers: Revenge of the Fallen | $2,535,751 | |
| 27 | July 5, 2009 | Ice Age: Dawn of the Dinosaurs | $2,868,989 | |
| 28 | July 12, 2009 | Ice Age: Dawn of the Dinosaurs | $5,070,840 | |
| 29 | July 19, 2009 | Harry Potter and the Half-Blood Prince | $6,693,629 | |
| 30 | July 26, 2009 | Harry Potter and the Half-Blood Prince | $4,467,892 | |
| 31 | August 2, 2009 | Harry Potter and the Half-Blood Prince | $4,384,032 | |
| 32 | August 9, 2009 | Harry Potter and the Half-Blood Prince | $2,878,132 | |
| 33 | August 16, 2009 | Harry Potter and the Half-Blood Prince | $2,924,380 | |
| 34 | August 23, 2009 | Harry Potter and the Half-Blood Prince | $2,358,941 | |
| 35 | August 30, 2009 | Inglourious Basterds | $3,440,078 | |
| 36 | September 6, 2009 | Inglourious Basterds | $3,522,140 | |
| 37 | September 13, 2009 | Inglourious Basterds | $2,423,686 | |
| 38 | September 20, 2009 | De Storm | $2,379,284 | |
| 39 | September 27, 2009 | De Storm | $3,359,816 | |
| 40 | October 4, 2009 | De Storm | $3,008,720 | |
| 41 | October 11, 2009 | Up | $3,999,389 | |
| 42 | October 18, 2009 | Up | $3,624,436 | |
| 43 | October 25, 2009 | Up | $5,329,162 | |
| 44 | November 1, 2009 | Michael Jackson's This Is It | $5,158,526 | |
| 45 | November 8, 2009 | Michael Jackson's This Is It | $3,917,086 | |
| 46 | November 15, 2009 | 2012 | $4,526,469 | |
| 47 | November 22, 2009 | 2012 | $4,815,644 | |
| 48 | November 29, 2009 | Komt een vrouw bij de dokter † | $5,420,105 | |
| 49 | December 6, 2009 | Komt een vrouw bij de dokter † | $4,201,583 | |
| 50 | December 13, 2009 | Komt een vrouw bij de dokter † | $3,654,152 | |
| 51 | December 20, 2009 | Avatar | $3,898,207 | |
| 52 | December 27, 2009 | Avatar | $7,014,824 | |

== See also ==
- List of Dutch films - Dutch films by year
