= 1994 in Dutch television =

This is a list of Dutch television related events from 1994.

== Events ==
- Unknown - Glennis Grace wins the tenth series of Soundmixshow, performing as Whitney Houston. She is the second Grand Final winner to portray the singer.

== Debuts ==
=== International ===
- 30 October – (United Kingdom) Budgie the Little Helicopter (Kindernet)

== Television shows ==
=== 1950s ===
- NOS Journaal (1956–present)

=== 1970s ===
- Sesamstraat (1976–present)

=== 1980s ===
- Jeugdjournaal (1981–present)
- Soundmixshow (1985-2002)
- Het Klokhuis (1988–present)

=== 1990s ===
- Goede tijden, slechte tijden (1990–present)

== Networks and services ==
=== Launches ===
Network	Type	Launch date	Notes	Source
Travel Channel International	Cable television	February		
Euro 7	Cable television	19 October		
