= 2010 in the Netherlands =

- Decades: 1990s; 2000s; 2010s; 2020s
- See also: Other events of 2010; History of the Netherlands

This article lists some of the events that took place in the Netherlands in 2010.

== Incumbents ==
- Monarch: Beatrix
- Prime Minister: Jan Peter Balkenende until October 14. After October 14 Mark Rutte

== Events ==
=== February ===
- 20: The question of to extend the mission in Afghanistan causes the fall of the 4th Balkenende administration.

=== March ===
- 10: 12 year old Milly Boele from Dordrecht is missing. Later on she turns out to have been murdered by neighbour and police officer Sander Vreeswijk. On March 17 her body is found in his garden.
- 16–19: Prince Willem-Alexander visits the Dutch soldiers of Task Force Uruzgan in Afghanistan.

24: Former SS member Heinrich Boere is sentenced to a lifetime imprisonment for his involvement in the assassination 3 Dutch citizens during World War II.

=== May ===
- 4: The national Remembrance of the Dead is interrupted during the 2 minutes of silence; 63 people get injured during the chaos and confusion that followed.

=== June ===
- 1-3: Queen Beatrix brings a state-visit to Norway. She arrives in harbor of Oslo with the Air-defense- and Command-frigate Hr. Ms. Tromp and is welcomed by salute shots.

=== August ===
1: Operation Task Force Uruzgan ends in Afghanistan and is succeeded by coalition partners.

=== October ===
- 1: the squatting ban goes into effect.
- 10: The Dutch Antilles are absolved: Curaçao and Sint Maarten continue as autonomous countries within the kingdom, the BES-islands (Saba, Saint Eustatius and Bonaire) become Dutch municipalities.
- 14: Installment of the Rutte I administration.

=== November ===
- 29: Snowfall causes the biggest evening peak traffic jam ever in the country, with a total length of 884 kilometers.

=== December ===
- 4: The Herziene Statenvertaling is officially presented in the Grote Kerk, Dordrecht

== Elections ==
- January 22:Netherlands Antilles general election, 2010. Twenty-two members of the Estates were elected.
- March 3: Dutch municipal elections, 2010.
- June 9: Dutch general election, 2010. Mark Rutte became prime minister.

== Sports ==
- April 25 - May 6: 2009–10 KNVB Cup finals.
- May 2: FC Twente wins the Eredivisie for the first time by beating NAC Breda.
- June 11 - July 11: Netherlands national football team 2010 participated in the 2010 FIFA World Cup. They lost the 2010 FIFA World Cup Final to Spain.
- July 31: 2010 Johan Cruijff Schaal
- August 8: Ellen van Dijk wins the 2010 Sparkassen Giro
- August 16: Merab Jordania becomes the new owner of soccer club SBV Vitesse from Arnhem.
- October 17: Getu Feleke wins the Amsterdam Marathon
- October 24: Feyenoord suffers its worst defeat (10-0) ever at the hands of PSV Eindhoven.
- October 31: The Dutch national korfball team win the European Championship korfball by beating Belgium in the final with 25–21.

=== See also ===
- 2009–10 Eredivisie
- 2009–10 Eerste Divisie
- 2009–10 KNVB Cup
- 2010 Johan Cruijff Schaal

== Deaths ==
- 8 January - Gerrit de Ruiter, 82, hockey player
- 1 February - Jaap van der Poll, 95, Olympic javelin thrower (1936 Summer Olympics).
- 11 March - Hans van Mierlo, 78, Dutch politician, Minister of Defence (1981–1982), Minister of Foreign Affairs (1994–1998), Deputy Prime Minister (1994–1998).
- 4 April - Rudy Kousbroek, 80, essayist.
- 9 May - Hans Dijkstal, 67, politician, Minister of the Interior and Deputy Prime Minister (1994–1998), cancer.
- 3 July - Cle Jeltes, 86, sailor.
- 11 August - Ger Lagendijk, 68, footballer (Hermes DVS) and football agent, heart attack.
- 1 September - Jean Nelissen, 74, cycling journalist.
- 5 October - Karel Hardeman, 96, Olympic rower.
- 1 December - Adriaan Blaauw, 96, astronomer.

== See also ==
- Netherlands in the Eurovision Song Contest 2010
- Netherlands in the Junior Eurovision Song Contest 2010
- List of Dutch Top 40 number-one singles of 2010
- 2010 Dutch cabinet formation
- Netherlands at the 2010 Winter Olympics
- 2010 in Dutch television
