= 2008 in the Netherlands =

- Decades: 1980s; 1990s; 2000s; 2010s; 2020s
- See also: Other events of 2008; History of the Netherlands

This article lists some of the events that took place in the Netherlands in 2008.

== Incumbents ==
- Monarch: Beatrix
- Prime Minister: Jan Peter Balkenende

== Events ==
=== January ===
- January 1: Wim Deetman resigns as mayor of The Hague.
- January 12: Two soldiers of Task Force Uruzgan, Lance Corporal Aldert Poortema (22) and Private First Class Wesley School (20), both of the Regiment Infanterie Johan Willem Friso, are killed in Uruzgan, Afghanistan
- January 15: Farshad Bashir (20) of the Socialist Party is sworn in as member of the House of Representatives, becoming the youngest member in history.
- January 26: Bishop Wim Eijk of Groningen-Leeuwarden is installed as Archbishop of Utrecht.

=== February ===
- February 3: Joran van der Sloot is unmasked in a high-profile TV-episode, made by Peter R. de Vries, about the disappearance of Natalee Holloway.

=== May ===
- 9: During a huge fire on a shipyard in De Punt (Drenthe) 3 firemen of the Eelde corps perish.

=== June ===
- 4: The rebuilt Wilms' Boô is officially opened by Princess Margriet of the Netherlands.
- Undated:
  - Sweet Empire, punk rock band from the Amsterdam is formed.

=== July ===
- 1: Most exceptions on the smoking ban are dropped.
- 10: The movie Hoe overleef ik mezelf? (How to survive myself?) gets a Gouden Film for getting 100.000 visitors.

=== September ===
- 24: Beginning of the Netherlands Film Festival.
- 28: Fortis is partially nationalized by The Netherlands, Belgium and Luxembourg whom together get 49% of the stocks in their control.
- 30: The Gouden Griffel for the best children-book goes to Jan Paul Schutten for his book Children of Amsterdam (Kinderen van Amsterdam).

=== October ===
- 3: The Dutch branch of Fortis becomes completely nationalized and taken over by the Dutch government.
- 5: Huge fire in a shopping mall in Spijkenisse.
- 8: The Maasvlakte Light is deactivated.
- 11: TV presenter Ernst-Paul Hasselbach (43) dies together with a female Belgian colleague in a traffic accident in Norway.

=== November ===
- 14: Domino Day 2008 is held in Leeuwarden, Friesland.

== Sports ==
- January 1: Koninklijke HFC win the traditional New Year's match against former international footballers 6–1.
- January 2: The Federatie Eredivisie Basketball of the Netherlands Basketball Association takes BC Omniworld of Almere out of the Eredivisie. The club had gone into administration.
- January 4: Jermo Ribbers (14), a member of the Dutch national youth ski jumping team, dies after a fall following a jump in Oberstdorf, Germany.
- March 26–30 Netherlands at the 2008 UCI Track Cycling World Championships

March 30: Ellen van Dijk becomes World Champion at the 2008 UCI Track Cycling World Championships in the Women's scratch

- July 3–6 Netherlands at the 2008 European Road Championships

Ellen van Dijk won the gold medal in the Women's time trial, the only Dutch medal at the championships.

- August 8–24 Netherlands at the 2008 Summer Olympics
- September 3–7 Netherlands at the 2008 UEC European Track Championships

The Netherlands won 6 medals: 2 gold, silver and 2 bronze medals. Ellen van Dijk won four of them including the two gold medals. She won gold in the Women's under-23 points race and the Women's under-23 scratch and silver in the Women's omnium and Women's under-23 individual pursuit.

- September 6–17 Netherlands at the 2008 Summer Paralympics

=== See also ===
- 2007–08 Eredivisie
- 2007–08 Eerste Divisie
- 2007–08 KNVB Cup
- 2008 Johan Cruijff Schaal

== Deaths ==
=== January ===
- January 1: Dirk van Egmond, 54, journalist for Veronica, KRO, Omroep Flevoland, TROS, AVRO and RTL Veronique.
- January 4: Anton P. de Graaff, 79, author
- January 28: Ginty Vrede, Surinamese-Dutch kick-boxer

=== February ===
- February 7: Benny Neyman, 56, singer
- February 22: Henk Bruna, 91, businessman, founder of the Bruna retail chain

=== March ===
- March 17: Ed Leeflang, 78, poet
- March 23: Wim Mager, 67, photographer, founder of Apenheul

=== April ===
- April 6: Jeu Sprengers, 69, chairman of the Royal Dutch Football Association

=== August ===
- August 14: Percy Irausquin, 39, fashion designer.

== See also ==
- 2008 in Dutch television
