= 2011 in the Netherlands =

- Decades: 1990s; 2000s; 2010s; 2020s
- See also: Other events of 2011; History of the Netherlands

This article lists some of the events that took place in the Netherlands in 2011.

== Incumbents ==
- Monarch: Beatrix
- Prime Minister: Mark Rutte

== Events ==
=== January ===
- 1: The BES-islands (Saba, Sint Eustatius and Bonaire) exchange their Antillean guilder for the American dollar.
- 5: In Moerdijk 23.500 liters of toxic and corrosive liquids escape during a large fire on the Chemie-Pack property.
- 8: Feyenoord says farewell to soccer legend Coen Moulijn.
- 11: A month after quitting as party chair of GreenLeft Femke Halsema leaves Congress.

=== February ===
- 1: Air-defense and Command-frigate Hr. Ms. Tromp leaves her home port of Den Helder towards the waters around Somalia to take part in the anti-piracy mission Atalanta.
- 11: Karlo Timmerman wins the alternative elfstedentocht on the Austrian Weissensee over a length of 200 kilometers. Mariska Huisman wins the woman's division.
- 28: 3 crew-members of a military helicopter are captured by Libyan militias. They flew with their Lynx of the Hr. Ms. Tromp to Sirte and landed there without permission.

=== March ===
- 9: The Nederlandse Spoorwegen (Dutch Railways) are handed a record fine of 2 million euro due to not complying with performance agreements with the government.
- 10-11: The 3 military crew-members are released during the night after intensive diplomatic discussions.

=== April ===
- 9: Alphen aan den Rijn shopping mall shooting

=== July ===
- 7: During the expansion of the Grolsch Veste an accident occurs with a lifting crane and makes part of the roof collapse. 2 people die and 14 others are injured.
- 15: Zendstation Smilde in Hoogersmilde partly collapses after a fire.

=== October ===
- 2: The Nederlands Scheepvaartmuseum reopens her doors for visitors.
- 31: An investigation into social-psychology papers uncovered massive amount of academic fraud at Dutch Universities. At least 30 papers by psychologist Diederik Stapel are found to have been faked.

=== November ===
- 12: The national arrival of Sinterklaas takes place in Dordrecht this year.

=== December ===
- 21: Astronaut André Kuipers starts his second space travel from the Baikonur Cosmodrome in Kazakhstan; he stays at the ISS for almost half a year.
- 29: Theater 't Speelhuis in Helmond is destroyed by a very large fire; the fire also damages several cube houses.

== Elections ==
- Dutch provincial elections, 2011

== Sports ==
- February 4: Ellen van Dijk wins the 2011 Ladies Tour of Qatar, including the youth and points classifications.

=== See also ===
- 2011–12 Eredivisie
- 2010–11 Eerste Divisie
- 2011–12 KNVB Cup
- 2011 Johan Cruijff Schaal
- 2011 Baseball World Cup
- Netherlands national football team 2011

== See also ==
- Netherlands in the Eurovision Song Contest 2011
- Netherlands in the Junior Eurovision Song Contest 2011
- List of Dutch Top 40 number-one singles of 2011
- List of number-one albums of 2011 (Netherlands)
- 2011 in Dutch television
