= 2010 in Dutch television =

This is a list of Dutch television related events from 2010.

== Events ==
- 7 February - Sieneke is selected to represent Netherlands at the 2010 Eurovision Song Contest with her song "Ik ben verliefd (Sha-la-lie)". She is selected to be the fifty-first Dutch Eurovision entry during Nationaal Songfestival held at Studio Baarn in Utrecht.
- 29 May - Jaap van Reesema wins the third series of X Factor, becoming the programme's first man to be crowned as winner.
- 10 September - 57-year-old opera singer Martin Hurkens wins the third series of Holland's Got Talent.

== Debuts ==
- 17 September - The Voice of Holland (2010–present)

== Television shows ==
=== 1950s ===
- NOS Journaal (1956–present)

=== 1970s ===
- Sesamstraat (1976–present)

=== 1980s ===
- Jeugdjournaal (1981–present)
- Het Klokhuis (1988–present)

=== 1990s ===
- Goede tijden, slechte tijden (1990–present)

=== 2000s ===
- X Factor (2006–present)
- Holland's Got Talent (2008–present)

== Networks and services ==
=== Launches ===
Network	Type	Launch date	Notes	Source
Fine Living	Cable television	1 April		
TV Rain	Cable television	27 April		
Disney Junior	Cable television	3 May		
192TV	Cable television	29 July		
Brava 3D	Cable television	25 November		

=== Conversions and rebrandings ===
Old network name	New network name	Type	Conversion Date	Notes	Source
Jetix	Disney XD	Cable television	1 January		

=== Closures ===
Network	Type	End date	Notes	Sources
Het Gesprek	Cable television	21 August		

== Deaths ==
Date	Name	Age	Cinematic Credibility
8 April	Teddy Scholten	83	Dutch singer & TV presenter

== See also ==
- 2010 in the Netherlands
