= 2004 in the Netherlands =

- Decades: 1980s; 1990s; 2000s; 2010s; 2020s
- See also: Other events of 2004; History of the Netherlands

This article lists some of the events that took place in the Netherlands in 2004.

== Incumbents ==
- Monarch: Beatrix
- Prime Minister: Jan Peter Balkenende

== Events ==
=== January ===
- January 13 – A 17-year-old student shoots and kills vice principal Hans van Wieren at the Terra College in The Hague.
- January – The second highest residential tower of The Netherlands is finished in Tilburg.

=== March ===
- March 20 – Queen Juliana dies age 94 in Soestdijk Palace.

=== April ===
- April 1 – An attempt is made to overrun politician Jozias van Aartsen with a car.

=== October ===
- October 2 – An estimate 200.000 people demonstrate in Amsterdam against the plans of the government. The demonstration is organized by the platform Keer het Tij (Turn the Tide) and "Nederland verdient beter" (the Netherlands deserve better).
- October 27 – Official edition of the New Bible translation (Nieuwe Bijbelvertaling, NBV) by the most important Dutch church fellowships.

=== November ===
- November 2 – Film-director Theo van Gogh is murdered in Amsterdam by Muslim-extremist Mohammed Bouyeri. The Syrian Redouan al-Issar, clerical leader of the Hofstad Network leaves the country on a false passport.
- November 10 — Police raid in Laakkwartier, The Hague.
- November 15 – The assassinated politician Pim Fortuyn is announced as The Greatest Dutchman.
- November 17 – Hella Haasse receives the Prijs der Nederlandse Letteren.

=== December ===
- December 1 – Prince Bernhard dies in Utrecht.
- December 26 – 36 Dutch people are among the victims of the 2004 Indian Ocean tsunami.
- December – Global Credit Data is formed.

== Sport ==
- August 13–29 Netherlands at the 2004 Summer Olympics
- September 17–28 Netherlands at the 2004 Summer Paralympics
- September 27 - October 3 Netherlands at the 2004 UCI Road World Championships

The Dutch team won 1 gold, 2 silver and 1 bronze medals, finishing third in the medal table.
Marianne Vos won gold in the Women's junior road race and Ellen van Dijk the bronze medal, Thomas Dekker won silver in both the Men's under-23 time trial and Men's under-23 road race.

- October 17: Robert Cheboror wins the Amsterdam Marathon

=== See also ===
- 2003–04 Eredivisie
- 2003–04 Eerste Divisie
- 2003–04 KNVB Cup
- 2004 Johan Cruijff Schaal

== Births ==
- 21 March – Count Claus-Casimir of Orange-Nassau, Jonkheer van Amsberg
- 26 July – Dilano van 't Hoff, racing driver (d. 2023)

== See also ==
- 2004 in Dutch television
