= 1968 in Dutch television =

This is a list of Dutch television related events from 1968.

== Events ==
- 8 January – The fourth episode of Hoepla was expected to air, but VPRO decided to cancel it due to host Phil Bloom being in a Playboy photoshoot. VPRO already had a back-up plan, opting to air Young People's Concerts in case of cancellation.
- 28 February – Ronnie Tober is selected to represent Netherlands at the 1968 Eurovision Song Contest with his song "Morgen". He is selected to be the thirteenth Dutch Eurovision entry during Nationaal Songfestival held at Tivoli in Utrecht.

== Television shows ==
=== 1950s ===
- NOS Journaal (1956–present)
- Pipo de Clown (1958–1980)

=== 1960s ===
- Stiefbeen en Zoon (1964–1971)

== Births ==
- 26 March – Martijn Krabbé, TV & radio presenter
- 6 July – Gordon Heuckeroth, singer & TV personality
- 10 November – Daphne Deckers, model, TV presenter & writer
- 4 December – Irene van de Laar, TV presenter & actress
