= 1957 in Dutch television =

This is a list of Dutch television related events from 1957.

== Events ==
- 3 February – Corry Brokken is selected to represent Netherlands at the 1957 Eurovision Song Contest with her song "Net als toen". She is selected to be the second Dutch Eurovision entry during Nationaal Songfestival held at AVRO Studios in Hilversum.
- 3 March – The Netherlands wins the 2nd Eurovision Song Contest in Frankfurt-am-Main, Germany. The winning song is "Net als toen" performed by Corry Brokken.

== Television shows ==
=== 1950s ===
- Dappere Dodo (1955–1964)
- NOS Journaal (1956–present)

== Births ==
- 24 April – Inge Ipenburg, actress
