= 2003 in the Netherlands =

- Decades: 1980s; 1990s; 2000s; 2010s; 2020s
- See also: Other events of 2003; History of the Netherlands

This article lists some of the events that took place in the Netherlands in 2003.

== Incumbents ==
- Monarch: Queen Beatrix
- Prime Minister: Jan Peter Balkenende

== Events ==
- January 1 - The Ravenstein municipality ceases to exist and is amalgamated into the Oss municipality.
- January 22 - Dutch general election, 2003
- February 10 - Mayor Haaksman of the Delfzijl resigns amidst allegations of affairs, crises and scandals in his municipality. Former minister Annemarie Jorritsma-Lebbink is placed as interim mayor shortly here after .
- March 11 - Provincial Elections.
- March 14 - Opening of the Westerscheldetunnel
- June 6 - The Dutch government announce that the Netherlands will contribute Marines and support units to the occupation of Iraq.
- June 30 - Announced that Prince Friso is to marry Mabel Wisse Smit.
- July - August - 2003 European Heatwave (lead to the deaths of ~1,500)
- August 7 - Arcen is struck by a heatwave and reached a temperature of 37,8 °C.
- October 10 - The Dutch Government revoke their approval of the marriage between Prince Friso and Mabel Wisse Smit. According to Prime Minister Jan Peter Balkenende the bride did not fully disclose her past and contact with top criminal Klaas Bruinsma.
- December 12 - The Dutch Reformed Church, Reformed Churches in the Netherlands and the Evangelical Lutheran Church in the Kingdom of the Netherlands decide to merge.

== Sport ==
- 2002–03 Eredivisie
- 2002–03 Eerste Divisie
- 2002–03 KNVB Cup
- 2003 Johan Cruijff Schaal
- William Kipsang wins the Amsterdam Marathon

== Births ==
- 21 April – Xavi Simons, footballer
- 16 September - Claude Kiambe, a singer-songwriter (was born in Congo, raised in Netherlands)
- 7 December – Catharina-Amalia, Princess of Orange

== Deaths ==
- January 28 - Mieke Pullen, runner (b. 1957)
- August 17 - Bertus Lüske, criminal, assassinated in Watergraafsmeer (b. 1944)
- September 11 - Ben Bril, boxer (b. 1912)
- October 24 - René Steegmans

== See also ==
- 2003 in Dutch television
