= 2012 in the Netherlands =

- Decades: 1990s; 2000s; 2010s; 2020s
- See also: Other events of 2012; History of the Netherlands

This article lists some of the events that took place in the Netherlands in 2012.

== Incumbents ==
- Monarch: Beatrix
- Prime Minister: Mark Rutte

== Events ==
=== January ===
- 2: Fire in the Goffert Stadium in Nijmegen.
- 3-7: High water by a Northwestern storm, together with heavy rainfall, causes water inconveniences in the Western and Northern parts of the country.
- 9: The Nederlandse Aardolie Maatschappij (NAM) reports the discovery of Metslawier-south, the largest gas field on dry land since 1995.
- 13: Joran van der Sloot is sentenced by a Peruvian court to 28 years in jail for the murder of Stephany Flores in 2010.
- 13: The price of gasoline matches its highest level ever. The asking price of gasoline is 1,757 euro per liter, making it 10 to 20 cents higher than in neighboring countries.
- 21: Laura Dekker arrives in Sint Maarten after a 518-day sailing trip around the world, making her youngest solo-sailor to sail around the world.
- 24: The oldest authentic museum building in The Netherlands, Het Teylers Museum in Haarlem, announces to co-operate with Wikipedia.
- 27: Willem Holleeder is released from prison after serving 2/3 of his jail term.
- 29: Speedskater Stefan Groothuis wins the world championship sprint at the Olympic Oval in Calgary.

=== February ===
- 1: The banks completely switch to SEPA for credit transfers.
- 3-4: Heavy snowfall causes many problems on the road in The Netherlands and other parts of Europe.
- 10: After hackers put the supposed data of hundreds of KPN customers online, at least 2 million customers have their mailboxes blocked for a day.
- 17: Prince Friso of Orange-Nassau is caught in an avalanche whilst skiing in Lech, Austria; the accident results in a severe brain injury that leaves the prince in a coma.
- 18: The Dutch polonaise record was broken in the Brabanthallen in 's-Hertogenbosch. It first stood at 1100 and is now bested with 1723 participants.
- 20: Labour Party politician Job Cohen announces to step down as party leader and chair of the congress fraction.

=== March ===
- 3: The first Apple Store in The Netherlands opens in Amsterdam.
- 6: Teachers protest in the Amsterdam ArenA against announced cutbacks of 300 million euro.
- 20: Politician Hero Brinkman leaves the Party for Freedom (PVV) and continues in congress as an independent member.
- 30: Because of structurally disappointing ad revenues, the free daily newspaper De Press prints its final edition.

=== April ===
- 2: The Friesland Bank is no longer capable to run as an independent bank and is taken over by the Rabobank. For the time being, the bank is run as a subsidiary of the Rabobank.
- 4: Phone and internet traffic is disrupted for many customers of Vodafone in the southern part of the Randstad, because of a fire in Rotterdam.
- 5: Start of the Floriade in Venlo.
- 8: In Espelo, Overijssel, a new world record is established by creating the highest bonfire ever. The bonfire had a height of 45,98 meters and a width of 160 meters.
- 11: The Parliamentary survey into the Financial System reveals that the Dutch government made some serious mistakes in 2008, during the rescue of Fortis, ABN AMRO and ING with billions of euros during the 2008 financial crisis, according to the published report of the De Wit Commission.
- 17-19: The Turkish president Abdullah Gül comes for a state visit to The Netherlands because of 400 years of friendly relations between the two countries. In 1612, the capitulation treaty between the Dutch Republic and the Ottoman Empire was signed. The state visit starts off on the Dam in Amsterdam.
- 21: Negotiations fail over new budget cuts; CDA, VVD and PVV can't agree on billions in cuts. PVV leader Geert Wilders leaves the Catshuis and stops permitting the current administration. The fall of the first Rutte administration seems inevitable.
- 21: Sloterdijk train collision: 2 trains frontally collide between Amsterdam Sloterdijk station and Amsterdam Centraal station, resulting in 1 fatality and 125 injured people.
- 23: The Rutte I administration falls. Mark Rutte offers his resignation to the Queen.
- 30: During Queen's Day, the municipalities of Rhenen and Veenendaal are visited by Queen Beatrix.

=== May ===
- 1: Street dealers increase disturbances on the streets when the "Weed Pass" is introduced in the provinces of Zeeland, Limburg and North Brabant.
- 5: Dutch author David Pefko wins the Gouden Boekenuil, the most important literature prize in Flanders, for his novel "Het voorseizoen".
- 7: Writer A.F.Th. van der Heijden wins the Libris Literatuur Prijs for his novel "Tonio".

=== July ===
- 1: Astronaut André Kuipers returns to earth after spending more than half a year in outer space.
- 18: 2 cars are used in an assault on the municipal office in Waalre. The fire that follows destroys the building completely.
- 22: The residents of approximately 180 homes are evacuated because of asbestos pollution in the Kanaleneiland neighborhood of Utrecht.

=== August ===
- 4: 13 people get injured and end up in the hospital after a sudden storm causes a marquee to collapse during the music festival of Dicky Woodstock near the village of Steenwijkerwold.

=== September ===
- 21: Project X Haren started as a public invitation to a birthday party on Facebook, but ended up as a gathering of thousands of youths causing riots on 21 September 2012 in the town of Haren, Groningen, Netherlands.
- 22: The Stedelijk Museum in Amsterdam is reopened by Queen Beatrix after a renovation period of 8 years. The museum has been expanded with a new futuristic extension (nicknamed "The bathtub"); it reopened for the public the next day.
- 25: Anouchka van Miltenburg (VVD) succeeds Gerdi Verbeet (Labour Party) as chair of congress. With 90 of the 146 valid votes, she bested Khadija Arib of the Labour Party and Gerard Schouw of D66.

=== October ===
- 5: The party leaders of GreenLeft revoke their trust in fraction leader Jolande Sap after the disastrous result in the general elections. She steps down and so does the party executive committee the following day.
- 16: During an art heist in the Kunsthal in Rotterdam, several paintings of Pablo Picasso, Henri Matisse, Claude Monet, Paul Gauguin, Meijer de Haan and Lucian Freud are stolen.
- 22: Jos van Rey VVD quits as alderman of Roermond and as a member of the Senate after being suspected of corruption and leaking information. The next day, the entire VVD fraction walks out of the municipal council coalition in Roermond.
- 29: Political leaders Mark Rutte VVD and Diederik Samsom Labour Party report in a press conference that the negotiations between both parties about the coalition agreement are finished.

=== November ===
- 5: The heads of the Rutte II administration are sworn in at the Paleis Huis ten Bosch.
- 9: After objections within the VVD, the coalition agreement of the Rutte II administration is revised. The announced income dependency of the health insurance premium is of the table.
- 17: Sinterklaas arrives in Roermond.
- 19: A suspect is arrested for the murder of Marianne Vaatstra in 1999. The suspect was found after a DNA kinship research.

=== December ===
- 1: The 10th edition of the Junior Eurovision song contest takes place in the Heineken Music Hall in Amsterdam.
- 6: Queen Beatrix officially opens the Hanzelijn (railway line between Lelystad and Zwolle) with a ride in the Royal train.
- 6: Co Verdaas steps down as state-secretary of Economic Affairs due to the commotion over his unlawful declarations during his time as deputy of Gelderland.
- 9: The Benelux train between Amsterdam and Brussels is replaced by the high velocity train Fyra.
- 24: DJs Gerard Ekdom, Michiel Veenstra and Giel Beelen collect €12,251,667 with 3FM Serious Request 2012.
- 31: The GPD, the press agency of many Dutch and Flemish newspapers, sends its last message after 76 years of service. In 2013, publisher Wegener will start their own press service, making GPD lose its most important customer and cease existence.

== Elections ==
- Dutch general election, 2012 took place on September 12. Mark Rutte won the election.

== Sports ==
- April 20–21: Ellen van Dijk wins both the time trial and road race at the 2012 EPZ Omloop van Borsele
- August 25–27: Ellen van Dijk wins the 2012 Lotto-Decca Tour
- October 21: Wilson Chebet wins the Amsterdam Marathon

== Deaths ==
- June 2: Jan Gmelich Meijling, Dutch commander and politician (b. 1943)

=== See also ===
- 2012–13 Eredivisie
- 2011–12 Eerste Divisie
- 2012–13 KNVB Cup
- 2012 Johan Cruijff Schaal
- Netherlands national football team 2012
- Netherlands at the 2012 Summer Olympics
- Netherlands at the 2012 Summer Paralympics
- Netherlands at the 2012 UCI Road World Championships
- Netherlands at the 2012 Winter Youth Olympics
- Netherlands at the 2012 UEC European Track Championships

== See also ==
- Netherlands in the Eurovision Song Contest 2012
- Netherlands in the Junior Eurovision Song Contest 2012
- List of Dutch Top 40 number-one singles of 2012
- 2012 in Dutch television
