= 1966 in Dutch television =

This is a list of Dutch television related events from 1966.

== Events ==
- 5 February - Milly Scott is selected to represent Netherlands at the 1966 Eurovision Song Contest with her song "Fernando en Filippo". She is selected to be the eleventh Dutch Eurovision entry during Nationaal Songfestival held at Tivoli in Utrecht.

== Television shows ==
=== 1950s ===
- NOS Journaal (1956–present)
- Pipo de Clown (1958-1980)

=== 1960s ===
- Stiefbeen en Zoon (1964-1971)

== Births ==
- 19 November - Esther Duller, TV presenter
