= 2014 in the Netherlands =

- Decades: 1990s; 2000s; 2010s; 2020s
- See also: Other events of 2014; History of the Netherlands

This article lists some of the events that took place in the Netherlands in 2014.

== Incumbents ==
- Monarch: William-Alexander
- Prime Minister: Mark Rutte

== Events ==
=== January ===
- 1: The drinking age is raised from 16 to 18 years of age, causing 16 year-olds in the Netherlands to go into mourning.
- 1: Darts player Michael van Gerwen wins the PDC World Darts Championship by beating Peter Wright in the final with 7-4.
- 17: In Groningen, the minister of Economic Affairs Henk Kamp presents the gas accord that was struck by the government, the province and NAM. The natural gas extraction in Loppersum will be reduced by 80% to decrease the chance of earthquakes. Groningen will be compensated for damages caused by the gas extraction.

=== February ===
- 10: Former minister Els Borst is found dead in her house in Bilthoven. The autopsy proves that she was murdered.

=== March ===
- 10: Passports and ID cards are from now on valid for 10 years. Also, ID cards no longer require fingerprints.
- 13: After years of construction, the renewed Rotterdam Centraal railway station is opened by King Willem-Alexander.
- 19: Remarks of the Party for Freedom leader Geert Wilders about too many Moroccans in The Hague and the rest of the country are broadly condemned. In the following days, politicians Roland van Vliet and Joram van Klaveren, amongst others, decide to leave the party. Many people also file reports against his remarks at police offices.
- 24-25: The 2014 Nuclear Security Summit is held in The Hague.
- 25: The University Medical Center Utrecht announces that on November 19, 2013 a 22-year-old woman got a complete plastic skull implanted. The artificial skull was created with the help of a 3D printer.

=== April ===
- 7: Friar Frans van der Lugt is murdered in Homs, Syria by radical Muslim terrorists.

=== May ===
- 2: Probation is given to Pim Fortuyn's murderer Volkert van der Graaf, after serving 2/3 of his 18 prison term. He needs to wear an ankle bracelet and is forbidden to access Rotterdam, Hilversum and Driehuis-Westerveld
- 24-31: The Toppers celebrate their 10 year anniversary with 4 concerts in the Amsterdam ArenA.

=== June ===
- 3: Explosions and fire at a complex of Royal Dutch Shell in the Moerdijk harbor and industrial area; two people end up injured.
- 24-25: King Willem-Alexander and Queen Máxima go to Poland for their first official state visit.

=== July ===
- 9: The paper train ticket is abolished.
- 17: Malaysia Airlines Flight MH17 crashed after having been shot down by air-surface missile near Torez in Donetsk Oblast, Ukraine, killing all 300 people on board, including 193 Dutch people.

21: Pro-Russian rebels allowed Dutch investigators to examine the bodies of MH17. By this time, according to Ukrainian officials, 272 bodies had been recovered. Remains left Torez on a train on the evening of 21 July, en route to Kharkiv to be flown to the Netherlands for identification.
23: A day of national mourning for the victims of the Malaysia Airlines Flight MH17.
In agreement with the Ukrainian government, the Netherlands are leading this investigation.
All remains were to be moved to the Netherlands with Dutch air force C-130 and Australian C-17 transport planes. The first remains were flown to Eindhoven on 23 July.

=== September ===
- Haaksbergen monstertruck accident:
  - On 28 September 2014, a monster truck crashed into the attending crowd in Haaksbergen. Three visitors were reported dead, amongst them a child. According to Hans Gerritsen, the mayor of Haaksbergen, twelve people were injured.

=== November ===
- 2014 Amsterdam drug deaths:
  - On 25 November, two British tourists (aged 20 and 21) died in a hotel room in Amsterdam, after snorting white heroin that was sold as cocaine by a street dealer. The bodies were found less than a month after another British tourist died in similar circumstances. At least 17 other people have had medical treatment after taking the white heroin.

== Elections ==
- 2014 Dutch municipal election

== Sports ==
- February 7–23 Netherlands at the 2014 Winter Olympics

The Netherlands competed at the 2014 Winter Olympics in Sochi, Russia from 7 to 23 February 2014. The Dutch team was the largest Dutch delegation at a Winter Olympics, with 41 competitors that participated in bobsleigh, short track speed skating, snowboarding, and speed skating. With a total of 24 medals, it turned out to be the most successful Winter Games ever for the Dutch team. The Dutch team won 23 medals in speed skating and one medal in short track speed skating. Olympic speed skating records were set on the men's 5,000 metres by Sven Kramer, the men's 10,000 metres by Jorrit Bergsma, the men's team pursuit by Jan Blokhuijsen, Sven Kramer and Koen Verweij, the women's 1,500 metres by Jorien ter Mors and the women's team pursuit by Marrit Leenstra, Jorien ter Mors and Ireen Wüst. By sweeping the podium in speed skating at the men's 500 m, 5,000 metres and 10,000 metres, and the women's 1,500 m, the Netherlands became the first country in Winter Olympics history to achieve four podium sweeps at one edition of the Games.

- March 7–16 Netherlands at the 2014 Winter Paralympics

Bibian Mentel wins the gold medal in the Women's snowboard cross, the only medal for the Netherlands.

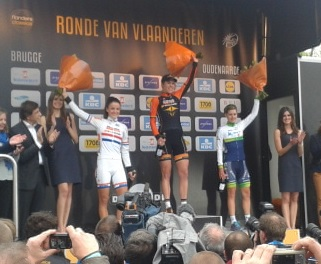
Ellen van Dijk won the Tour of Flanders

- April 6: Ellen van Dijk wins the Tour of Flanders, a women's road cycling World Cup race.
- July 10–13 Netherlands at the 2014 European Road Championships

The Netherlands wins 2 gold medals and ended third in the medal table.

- August 12–17 Netherlands at the 2014 European Athletics Championships

The Netherlands wins 3 gold, 2 silver and 1 bronze medal.

- August 23 - September 7 Netherlands at the 2014 FEI World Equestrian Games
- August 16 - August 28 Netherlands at the 2014 Summer Youth Olympics
- September 21–28 Netherlands at the 2014 UCI Road World Championships

=== See also ===
- 2014–15 Eredivisie
- 2014–15 KNVB Cup

== See also ==
- Netherlands in the Eurovision Song Contest 2014
- List of Dutch Top 40 number-one singles of 2014
- Malaysia Airlines Flight 17
- 2014 in Dutch television
