= 2011 in Dutch television =

This is a list of Dutch television related events from 2011.

== Events ==
- 21 January – Ben Saunders wins the first series of The Voice of Holland.
- 13 February – The television reality show Secret Story debuts on NET 5.
- 12 May – The first series of Secret Story is won by Sharon Hooijkaas.
- 10 June – Rochelle Perts wins the fourth series of X Factor.
- 16 September – 11-year-old singer Aliyah Kolf wins the fourth series of Holland's Got Talent.

== Television shows ==
=== 1950s ===
- NOS Journaal (1956–present)

=== 1970s ===
- Sesamstraat (1976–present)

=== 1980s ===
- Jeugdjournaal (1981–present)
- Het Klokhuis (1988–present)

=== 1990s ===
- Goede tijden, slechte tijden (1990–present)

=== 2000s ===
- X Factor (2006–present)
- Holland's Got Talent (2008–present)

=== 2010s ===
- The Voice of Holland (2010–present)

== Networks and services ==
=== Launches ===
Network	Type	Launch date	Notes	Source
Comedy Central Extra	Cable television	Unknown		
DocuBox	Cable television	Unknown		
Crime + Investigation	Cable television	July		
TLC	Cable television	4 July		
TV 538	Cable television	4 July		
RTL Crime	Cable television	1 September		
Cartoonito	Cable and satellite	12 October		

=== Conversions and rebrandings ===
Old network name	New network name	Type	Conversion Date	Notes	Source
Film1.1	Film1 Premiere	Cable television	25 February		
Film1.2	Film1 Family	Cable television	25 February		
Bebe TV	Duck TV	Cable television	Unknown		
TMF Nederland	MTV Music 24	Cable television	1 September		

=== Closures ===
Network	Type	End date	Notes	Sources
Hallmark Channel	Cable television	20 July		

== Deaths ==
Date	Name	Age	Cinematic Credibility
2 June	Willem Duys	82	Dutch radio & TV presenter & tennis commentator

Willem Duys was one of the Netherlands' best-known television personalities and presented the influential talk show Voor de Vuist Weg, which attracted millions of viewers.

== See also ==
- 2011 in the Netherlands
