= 1959 in Dutch television =

This is a list of Dutch television related events from 1959.

== Events ==
- 17 February – Teddy Scholten is selected to represent Netherlands at the 1959 Eurovision Song Contest with her song "Een beetje". She is selected to be the fourth Dutch Eurovision entry during Nationaal Songfestival held at AVRO Studios in Hilversum.
- 11 March – The Netherlands wins the 4th Eurovision Song Contest in Cannes. The winning song is "Een beetje" performed by Teddy Scholten.

== Television shows ==
=== 1950s ===
- Dappere Dodo(1955-1964)
- NOS Journaal (1956–present)
- Pipo de Clown (1958-1980)
