= 1999 in the Netherlands =

- Decades: 1970s; 1980s; 1990s; 2000s; 2010s
- See also: Other events of 1999; History of the Netherlands

This article lists some of the events that took place in the Netherlands in 1999.

== Incumbents ==
- Monarch: Beatrix
- Prime Minister: Wim Kok

== Events ==
- January 1: The Euro Currency officially entered circulation in the European Union (EU) Eurozone member area countries, then formally made its debut on European and the world financial markets.
- February 25: A legionellosis outbreak occurs in Bovenkarspel.
- March 25: Political party Livable Netherlands is founded.
- May 1: Marianne Vaatstra is murdered in Veenklooster
- May 22: The European Soundmix Show 1999 takes place in Amsterdam.
- June 10: The European Parliament election takes place.
- June 21: Free newspaper Spits is founded.
- July 1: The Dutch Transport Safety Board is founded.
- July 1: Europol is founded.
- September 23: A widow is murdered in her house in Deventer, this is the beginning of the Deventer murder case.
- November 1: Two laboratories merge into the Netherlands Forensic Institute.
- November 19: Wie is de Mol? was first broadcast on Dutch television.

== Music ==
- List of Dutch Top 40 number-one singles of 1999
- Netherlands in the Eurovision Song Contest 1999

== Sport ==
- 1998–99 in Dutch football
- 1999 Dutch Open (tennis)
- 1999 ABN AMRO World Tennis Tournament
- 1999 Heineken Trophy
- 1999 World Table Tennis Championships
- 1999 Amstel Gold Race
- 1999 Ronde van Nederland
- 1999 Dutch TT
- 1999 Masters of Formula 3

== See also ==
- 1999 in Dutch television
