= 1955 in Dutch television =

This is a list of Dutch television related events from 1955.

== Debuts ==
- 3 February – Dappere Dodo made its television debut.

== Births ==
- 25 March – Patty Brard, singer and television presenter, was born in 1955.
- 20 October – Robert ten Brink, television presenter and actor, was born in 1955.
