= 1997 in the Netherlands =

- Decades: 1970s; 1980s; 1990s; 2000s; 2010s
- See also: Other events of 1997; History of the Netherlands

Events in the year 1997 in the Netherlands.

== Incumbents ==
- Monarch: Beatrix
- Prime Minister: Wim Kok

== Events ==
- 4 january - 15th (and last?) Elfstedentocht
- 6 to 14 September – The 1997 Men's European Volleyball Championship was held in the Netherlands, in the two cities of Den Bosch and Eindhoven.

== Births ==
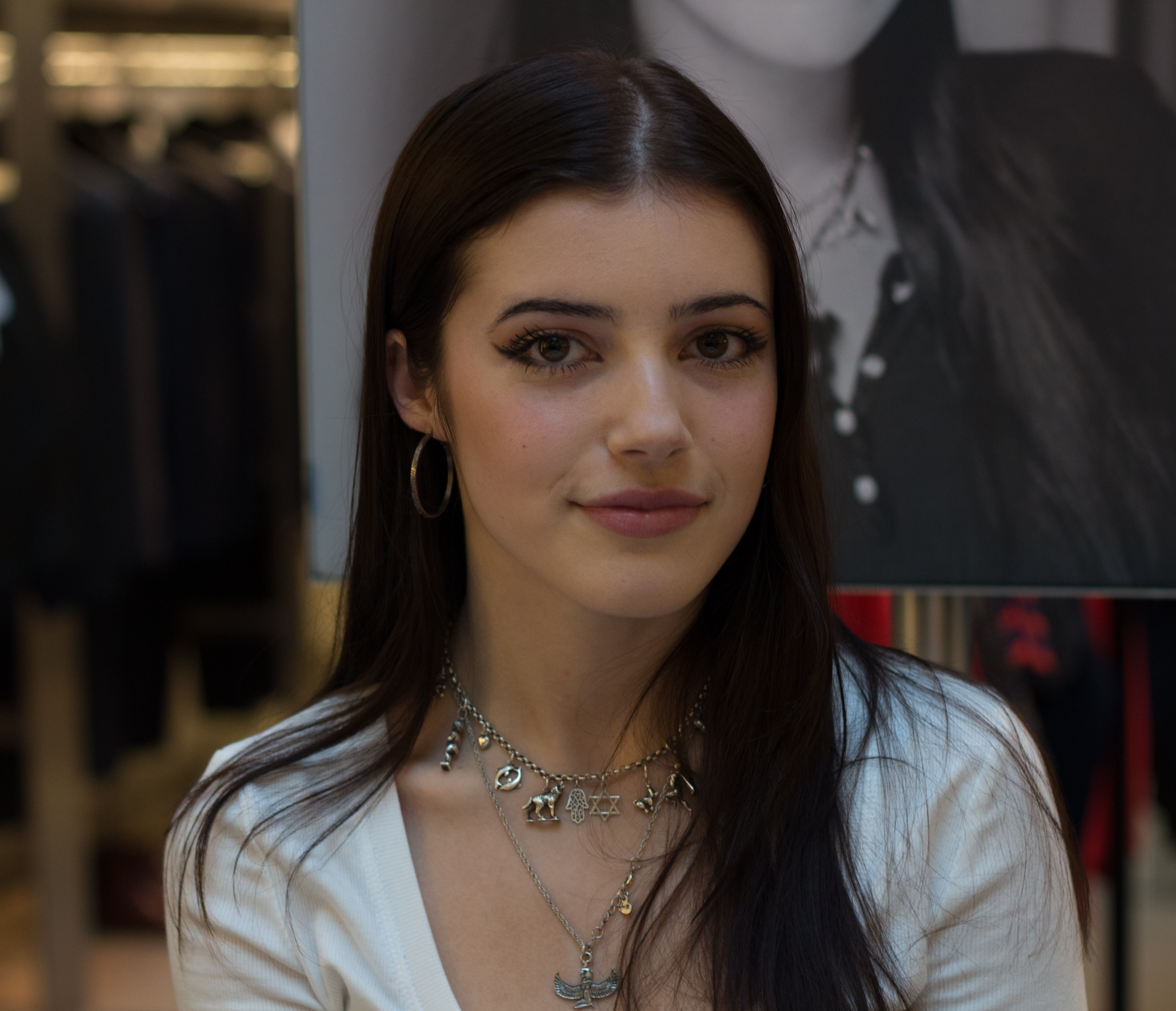
Solomonica de Winter

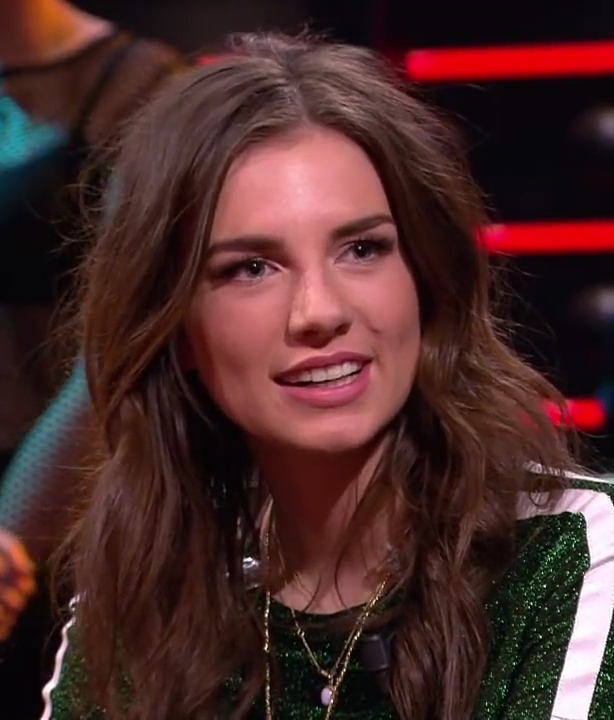
Maan de Steenwinkel

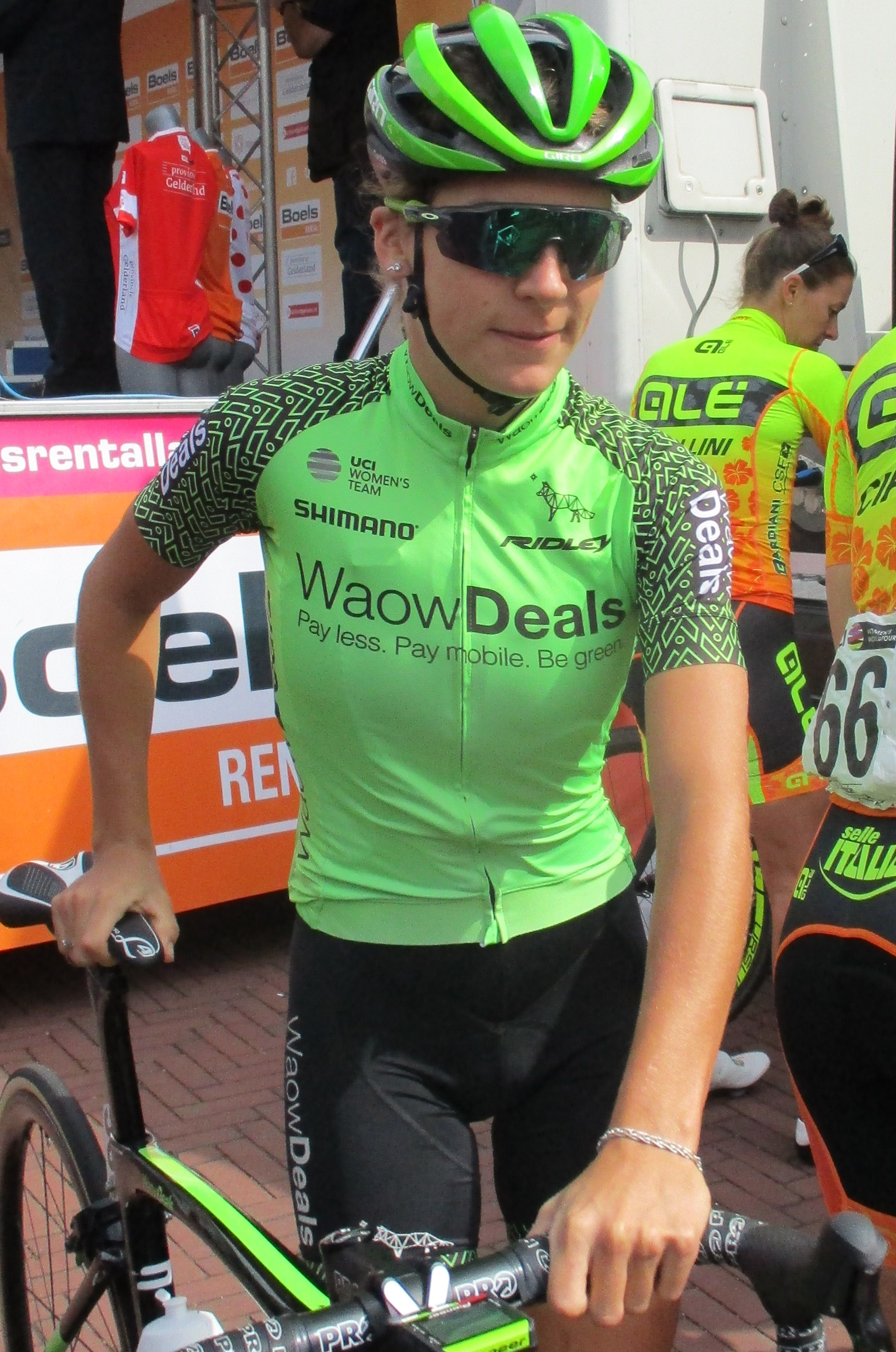
Yara Kastelijn

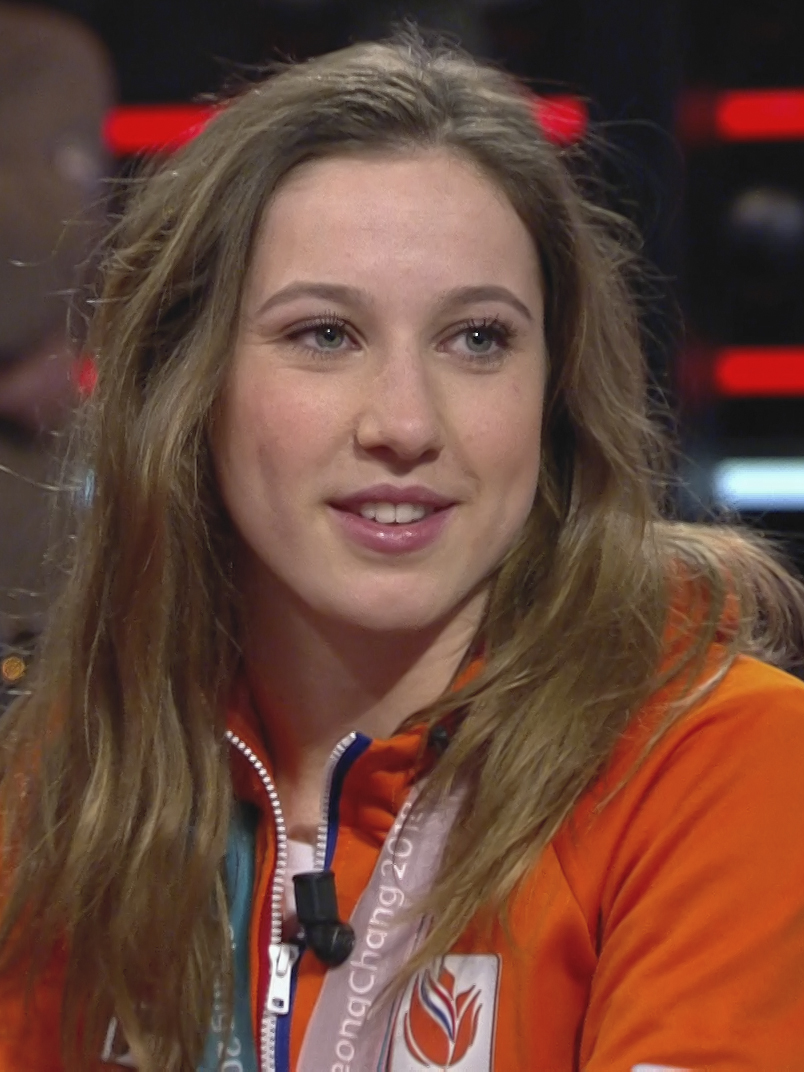
Suzanne Schulting

- 2 January – Gijs Blom, actor
- 4 January – Patrick Maneschijn, footballer
- 5 January – Thijs van Dam, field hockey player
- 7 January – Pablo Rosario, footballer
- 19 January – Marcel Bosker, speed skater
- 31 January – Arnaut Danjuma, footballer
- 8 February – Robin Ciric, kickboxer
- 8 February – Pascal Eenkhoorn, cyclist.
- 10 February – Maan de Steenwinkel, singer and actress
- 16 February – Thijmen Goppel, footballer
- 28 February – Joanne Koenders, water polo player
- 14 March – Harrie Lavreysen, track cyclist
- 17 March – Daniel Sprong, ice hockey player
- 28 March – Asad Zulfiqar, cricketer
- 18 April – Donny van de Beek, footballer
- 30 April – Sam Lammers, footballer
- 12 May – Frenkie de Jong, footballer
- 2 June – Michel Vlap, footballer
- 3 June – Solomonica de Winter, writer
- 3 July – Jeremy Helmer, footballer
- 8 July – Kevin Inkelaar, cyclist.
- 22 July – Terrence Bieshaar, basketball player
- 23 July – Fabian Plak, volleyball player
- 2 August – Esmee de Graaf, footballer
- 6 August – Rinka Duijndam, handball player.
- 9 August – Yara Kastelijn, racing cyclist.
- 5 September – Maartje Verhoef, fashion model
- 25 September – Suzanne Schulting, speed skater.
- 1 October – Stan van Bladeren, footballer
- 8 October – Steven Bergwijn, footballer
- 10 October – Tessa Polder, volleyball player
- 10 November – Joost Klein, musician
- 26 December – Nicole Oude Luttikhuis, volleyball player

== Deaths ==
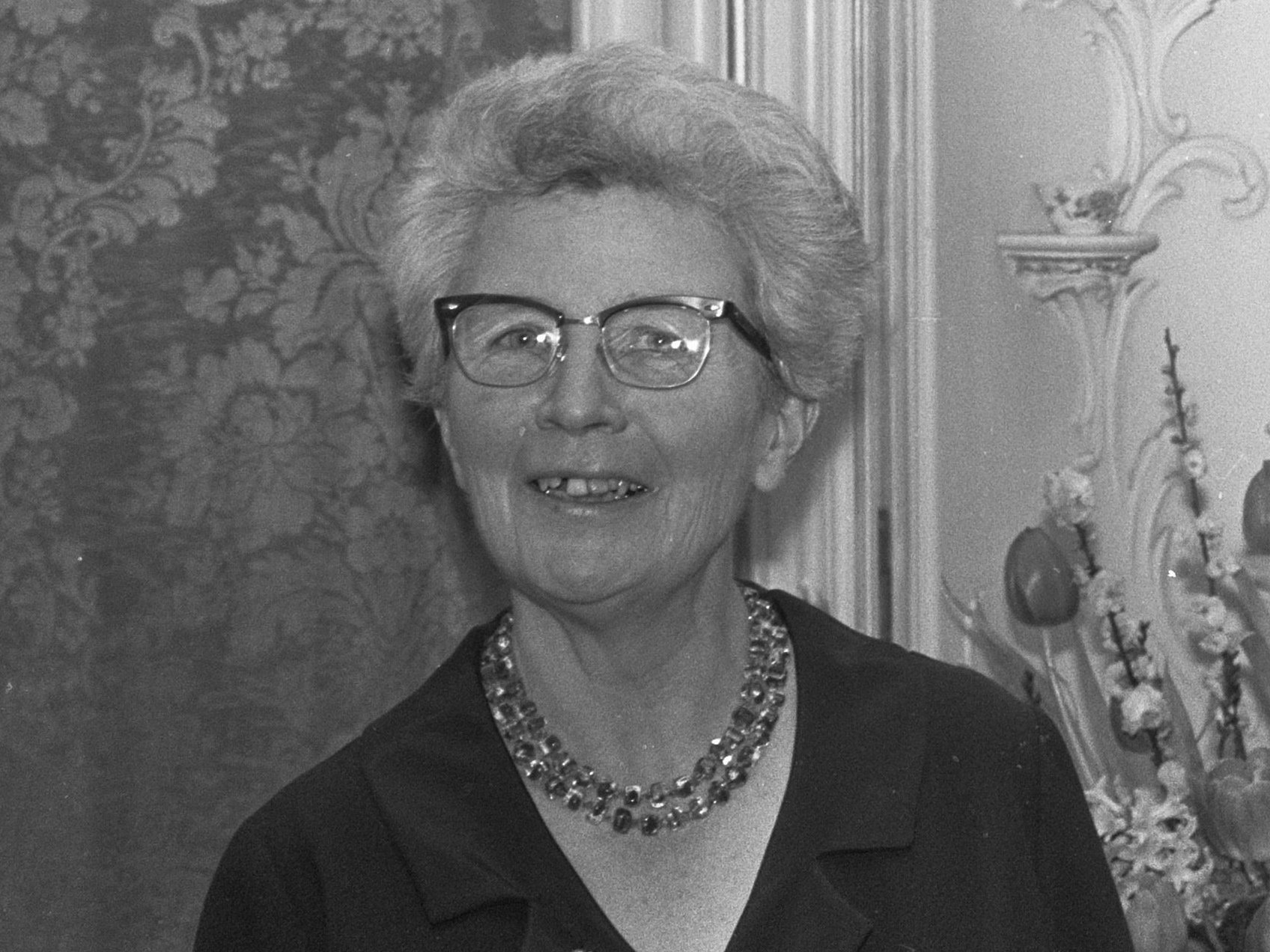
Ida Gerhardt

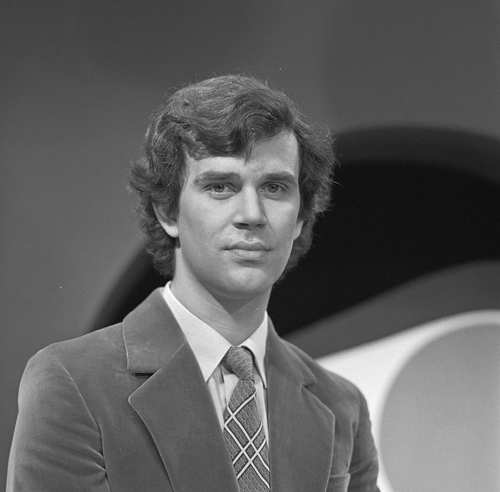
Coen van Vrijberghe de Coningh

- 5 January – Frans Piët, comics artist (b. 1905)
- 10 January – Julie van der Veen, visual artist (b. 1903)
- 21 January – Jan Dekkers, painter, designer and sculptor (b. 1919)
- 8 March – Niel Steenbergen, sculptor, painter and medalist (b. 1911)
- 26 May – Jack Jersey, singer, composer, arranger, lyricist and music producer (b. 1941)
- 10 June – Leo Fuld, singer (b. 1912)
- 8 July – Dick van Dijk, footballer (b. 1946)
- 6 August – Berend Hendriks, artist (b. 1918)
- 15 August – Ida Gerhardt, classicist and poet (b. 1905)
- 15 November – Coen van Vrijberghe de Coningh, actor, musician, composer, record producer and television presenter (b. 1950)
- 20 December – Jan van Stolk, ceramist (b. 1920)
