= 1958 in Dutch television =

This is a list of Dutch television related events from 1958.

== Events ==
- 11 February – Corry Brokken is selected to represent Netherlands at the 1958 Eurovision Song Contest with her song "Heel de wereld". She is selected to be the third Dutch Eurovision entry during Nationaal Songfestival held at AVRO Studios in Hilversum.
- 12 March – The 3rd Eurovision Song Contest 1958 is held at the Algemene Vereniging Radio Omroep in Hilversum, Netherlands. France wins the contest with the song "Dors, mon amour" performed by André Claveau. The year marks the first time the contest was won by a male solo singer.

== Debuts ==
- 17 September – Pipo de Clown (1958-1980)

== Television shows ==
- Dappere Dodo (1955–1964)
- NOS Journaal (1956–present)

== Births ==
- 20 January – Paula Patricio, Portuguese-born TV presenter
- 22 March – Astrid Joosten, TV presenter, actress & writer
