= 1970 in Dutch television =

This is a list of Dutch television related events from 1970.

== Events ==
- 11 February – Hearts of Soul are selected to represent Netherlands at the 1970 Eurovision Song Contest with their song "Waterman". They are selected to be the fifteenth Dutch Eurovision entry during Nationaal Songfestival held at Congresgebouw in The Hague.
- 21 March – The 15th Eurovision Song Contest is held at the RAI Congrescentrum in Amsterdam. Ireland wins the contest with the song "All Kinds of Everything", performed by Dana, while the Dutch entry "Waterman" by Hearts of Soul finishes in 7th place.

== Television shows ==
=== 1950s ===
- NOS Journaal (1956–present)
- Pipo de Clown (1958–1980)

=== 1960s ===
- Stiefbeen en Zoon (1964–1971)

== Births ==
- 8 September – Helga van Leur, weathergirl
- 24 December – Beau van Erven Dorens, actor, TV presenter & writer
