= 1967 in Dutch television =

This is a list of Dutch television related events from 1967.

== Events ==
- 2 January – The first Ster commercial break airs on Nederland 1 shortly before 7pm with the first commercial seen being for CEBUCO, who used it as a platform to keep the newspaper advertising industry afloat.

== Television shows ==
=== 1950s ===
- NOS Journaal (1956–present)
- Pipo de Clown (1958-1980)

=== 1960s ===
- Stiefbeen en Zoon (1964-1971)

== Births ==
- 27 January - Rudolph van Veen, TV chef
