= 1965 in Dutch television =

This is a list of Dutch television related events from 1965.

== Events ==
- 13 February - Conny Vandenbos is selected to represent Netherlands at the 1965 Eurovision Song Contest with her song "'t Is genoeg". She is selected to be the tenth Dutch Eurovision entry during Nationaal Songfestival held at Concordia Theatre in Bussum.

== Television shows ==
=== 1950s ===
- NOS Journaal (1956–present)
- Pipo de Clown (1958–1980)

=== 1960s ===
- Stiefbeen en Zoon (1964–1971)

== Births ==
- 17 April - Joris Lutz, actor & TV presenter
- 26 October - Humberto Tan, TV & radio presenter & writer
