= 1961 in Dutch television =

This is a list of Dutch television related events from 1961.

== Events ==
- 18 March – Luxembourg wins the Eurovision Song Contest with the song "Nous les amoureux" by Jean-Claude Pascal. The Netherlands finish in tenth place with the song "Wat een dag" by Greetje Kauffeld.

== Television shows ==
=== 1950s ===
- Dappere Dodo(1955-1964)
- NOS Journaal (1956–present)
- Pipo de Clown (1958–1980)

== Births ==
- 4 August – Harm Edens, writer & TV presenter
