= 1969 in Dutch television =

This is a list of Dutch television related events from 1969.

== Events ==
- 26 February – Lenny Kuhr is selected to represent Netherlands at the 1969 Eurovision Song Contest with her song "De troubadour". She is selected to be the fourteenth Dutch Eurovision entry during Nationaal Songfestival held at Circustheater in Scheveningen.
- 29 March – The Netherlands shares the win of the 14th Eurovision Song Contest, in a four-way tie with France, Spain and the United Kingdom. Lenny Kuhr represents the Netherlands, singing "De troubadour".

== Television shows ==
=== 1950s ===
- NOS Journaal (1956–present)
- Pipo de Clown (1958–1980)

=== 1960s ===
- Stiefbeen en Zoon (1964–1971)

== Births ==
- 24 April – Ruud de Wild, TV & radio presenter
