= 2002 in the Netherlands =

- Decades: 1980s; 1990s; 2000s; 2010s; 2020s
- See also: Other events of 2002; History of the Netherlands

This article lists some of the events that took place in the Netherlands in 2002.

== Incumbents ==
- Monarch: Beatrix
- Prime Minister: Wim Kok after July 22 Jan Peter Balkenende

== Events ==
- January 1 - The Euro Currency officially became the legal tender for The Netherlands, along with the other European Union (EU) Eurozone member area countries, replacing the Dutch guilder by being introduced physically with the official launch of the currency coins and banknotes. The Netherlands entered an economic period where specifically both the Euro Currency and the Dutch guilder were in dual circulation until specifically February 28.
- February 2 - Wedding of Willem-Alexander, Prince of Orange, and Máxima Zorreguieta Cerruti in Amsterdam.
- April 10 - The Dutch Institute for War Documentation presents its findings in the investigation of the Srebrenica Massacre.
- April 16 - The Dutch government resigns over the findings of the Dutch Institute for War Documentation into the Srebrenica Massacre.
- May 6 - Maverick politician Pim Fortuyn is assassinated by animal rights activist Volkert van der Graaf.
- May 15 - Pim Fortuyn's LPF are the winners of the Dutch general elections, winning 26 out of 150 parliamentary seats and becoming the second biggest party of the Netherlands, in the first election the party has participated in.
- July 22 - Jan Peter Balkenende succeeds Wim Kok as Prime Minister, as his government, consisting of CDA, LPF and VVD is sworn in.
- July 22 - A few hours after having been sworn in, LPF's State Secretary for Social Affairs and Work Opportunity (Staatssecretaris van Sociale Zaken en Werkgelegenheid) Philomena Bijlhout resigns after evidence was presented that she had been a member of a militia of Dési Bouterse in Suriname in 1982 and 1983, something she had denied until that moment.
- October 16 - The Dutch government falls after infighting in the LPF.

== Sports ==
- 2001–02 Eredivisie
- 2001–02 Eerste Divisie
- 2001–02 KNVB Cup
- 2002 Johan Cruijff Schaal
- The Netherlands won the bronze medal at the 2002 Field Hockey World Cup in Kuala Lumpur, Malaysia and the gold medal at the Men's Champions Trophy in Cologne, Germany.
- Feyenoord claims the UEFA Cup for the second time in the history of the club, after a 3–2 win in the final against Borussia Dortmund.
- The Netherlands national football team failed to qualify for the 2002 World Cup held in South Korea and Japan.
- The Netherlands won a total of 8 medals at the 2002 Winter Olympic Games in Salt Lake City, Utah, United States. They consisted of three golds and five silvers, all won in the area of speed skating.
- Benjamin Kimutai wins the Amsterdam Marathon

== Births ==
- March 10 – Ian Maatsen, footballer
- May 16 – Ryan Gravenberch, footballer
- June 8 – Countess Eloise of Orange-Nassau, Jonkvrouwe van Amsberg, daughter of Prince Constantijn and Princess Laurentien of the Netherlands
- June 24 – Sem Scheperman, Malaysian footballer

== Deaths ==
- January 3 – Freddy Heineken, businessman (born 1923)
- May 6 – Pim Fortuyn, politician, civil servant, sociologist, author and professor (born 1948)
- June 20 – Tinus Osendarp, Olympic runner (born 1916)
- July 25 – Hans Dorjee, football (soccer) player and manager (born 1941)
- October 6 – Prince Claus of the Netherlands (born 1926)

== See also ==
- 2002 in Dutch television
