= Elvan Akyıldız =

Dutch actress, presenter and cabaret performer

Elvan Akyıldız (born 31 January 1977 in İzmir) is a Dutch actress, presenter and cabaret performer of Turkish origin. She is best known for her role as Elvan on Sesamstraat, the Dutch co-production of Sesame Street.

Elvan Akyıldız plays in theatre group Hassan's Angels.

== Filmography ==
Film
Year	Film	Role
2004	Het Zuiden	Rana
1994	Krima-Kerime	

=== Television ===
Year	Film	Role
2008	Taxi 656	Zwanger meisje
2005	Open huis in Sesamstraat	Elvan
2004-1994	Onderweg naar morgen	Elif Özal
2004	Missie Warmoesstraat	Zeynep Alici
1997	Sesamstraat	Elvan
1996	Fort Alpha	Ayse Köroglu
