= 2013 in the Netherlands =

- Decades: 1990s; 2000s; 2010s; 2020s
- See also: Other events of 2013; History of the Netherlands

This article lists some of the events that took place in the Netherlands in 2013.

== Incumbents ==
- Monarch: Beatrix (abdicated, April 30), William-Alexander (ascended April 30)
- Prime Minister: Mark Rutte

== Events ==
=== January ===
- 1: During New Year's Eve in Raard, a woman drives into a group of people, leaving 17 people injured. One of the victims later succumbs to his injuries.
- 10: During the New Year's reception of the umbrella organization of independent financial advisers, 477 attendees pledge the bankers oath for the first time in the presence of minister Dijsselbloem.
- 13: Sven Kramer becomes European ice-skating champion in the man's division and Ireen Wüst becomes champion in the woman's division.
- 15: Bob de Vries wins the first marathon on natural ice of 2013 in Noordlaren. Mariska Huisman is the fastest in the woman's division.
- 28: Beatrix, incumbent Queen of the Netherlands, announces that on 30 April, she will abdicate in favour of her son William-Alexander.

=== February ===
- 5: The Sint-Clemenskerk in Nes (on the island Ameland) is destroyed in a fire.

=== March ===
- 13: Prayer day for crops and labor.
- 16: Poker player Ruben Visser wins in season 9 of the European Poker Tour in London; the prize money is £595,000.

=== April ===
- 21: RTL News exposes a large scale fraud committed by Bulgarians criminals.
- 30: Willem-Alexander becomes the new King of the Netherlands, the first male monarch in over 123 years, after his mother's abdication.

=== May ===
- 6: After two brothers (7 and 9) are reported missing, their father is found dead a day later. The bodies of the two brothers are found on May 19 near a drainage tube in Cothen

=== June ===
- 8: Journalist Judith Spiegel and her husband Boudewijn Berendsen are abducted in Yemen. They are released on 10 December.
- 11: Led by the SER, an energy deal on the main lines comes to fruition between the political establishment, business community and environmental organizations.

=== July ===
- 23: In amusement park Walibi Holland, a 10-year-old Israeli girl gets badly injured in a water attraction and loses her foot.
- 25: In both The Netherlands and Belgium, a heatwave breaks out, the first of its kind since July 2006.

=== August ===
- 4: A 23-year-old Polish man drowns near Callantsoog.
- 12: Prince Friso is announced dead due to complications from his skiing accident in 2012.
- 23: A 32-year-old Polish man drowns in the Piusharbor, Tilburg.

=== September ===
- 8: A family tragedy takes place in Schoonloo: A father kills his three sons (10-year-old twins and a two-year-old) and himself.

=== October ===
- 13: DierenPark Amersfoort closes its gates for the second time in its history after a severe rainfall.
- 15: Michel van Egmond's book "Gijp" wins the NS Publieksprijs voor het Nederlandse Boek. The book is about former soccer player and pundit René van der Gijp.
- 28: Hurricane wind strengths are measured on the island of Vlieland and at Lauwersoog; the heaviest wind thrust is recorded at 152 km/h.

=== November ===
- 12: The rare northern hawk-owl is spotted in Zwolle. The owl was last seen in 2005. In the previous 100 years, it had only been spotted 3 times.
- 30: The Association Council of the AVRO and the Member Council of the TROS approve the merger proposition of the two public broadcasters. Starting 1 January 2014, both will continue as AVROTROS.

=== December ===
- 2-7: Dutch bishops of the Roman Catholic Church make an ad limina visit to Pope Francis.

== Sports ==
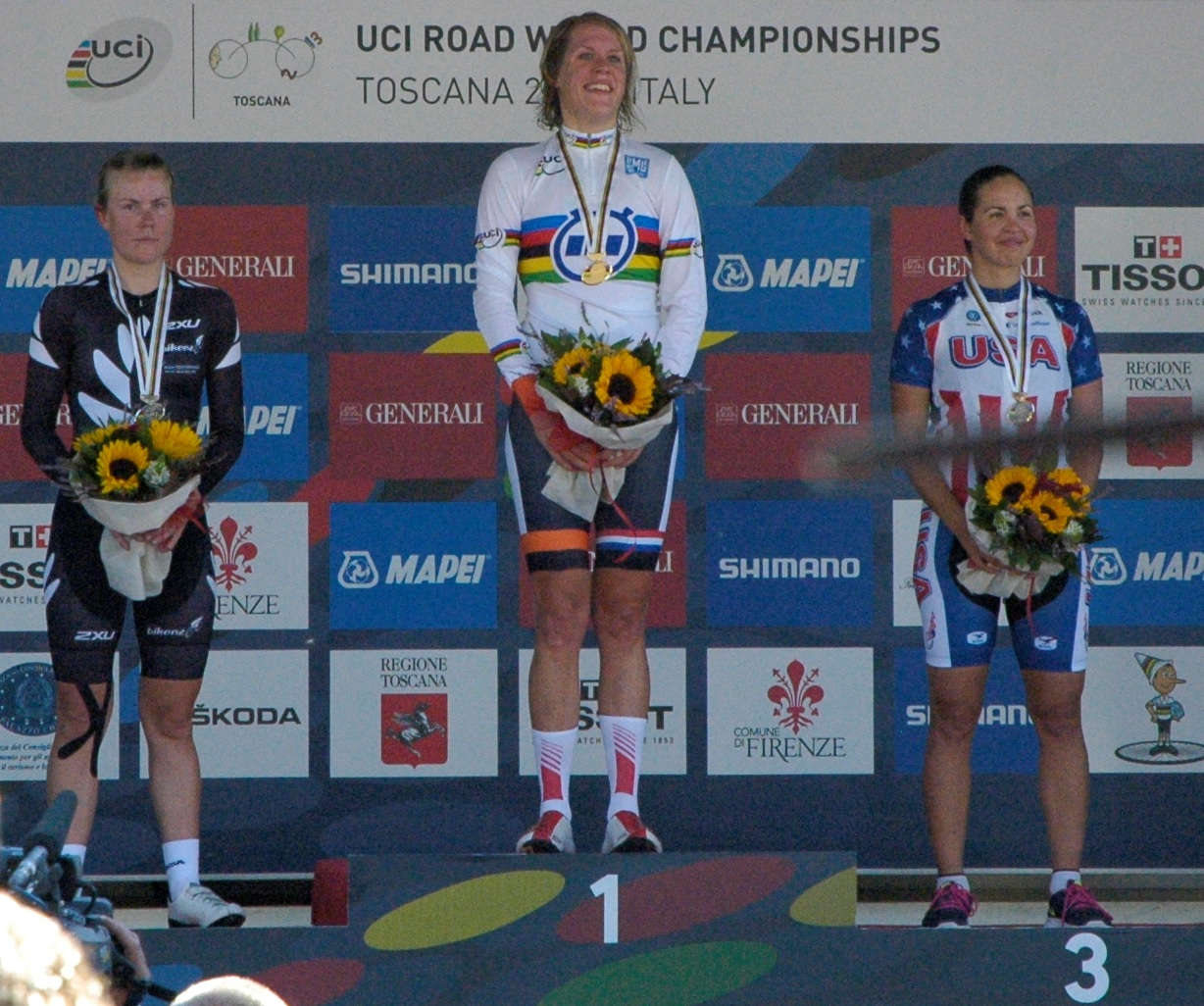
Ellen van Dijk won the women's time trial at the Road Cycling World Championships.

- April 3–7: Ellen van Dijk wins the 2013 Energiewacht Tour
- July 18–21 Netherlands at the 2013 European Road Championships

Floortje Mackaij wins the silver medal in the Women's junior time trial, the only medal for the Netherlands at the championships.

- July 19 - August 4 Netherlands at the 2013 World Aquatics Championships

The Netherlands wins 1 gold and 3 bronze medals.

- August 10–18 Netherlands at the 2013 World Championships in Athletics

The Netherlands wins 1 silver and 1 bronze medal.

- September 3–8: Ellen van Dijk wins the 2013 Boels Rental Ladies Tour
- September 22–29 Netherlands at the 2013 UCI Road World Championships

The Dutch team wins the medal table at the 2013 UCI Road World Championships in September with 3 gold and 1 silver medal.
Ellen van Dijk won gold in the Women's time trial, Marianne Vos in the Women's road race and Mathieu van der Poel in the Men's junior road race.

- October 18–20 Netherlands at the 2013 UEC European Track Championships

The Netherlands win 2 gold, 3 silver and 1 bronze medal.

- October 20, Wilson Chebet wins the Amsterdam Marathon for the 2nd time in a row.

=== See also ===
- 2013–14 Eredivisie
- 2012–13 Eerste Divisie
- 2013–14 KNVB Cup
- 2013 Johan Cruijff Schaal
- Netherlands national football team 2013

== Deaths ==
- 15 February - Giovanni Narcis Hakkenberg, war hero (b. 1923)
- 10 June – Saskia Holleman, actress, lawyer and model (b. 1945).

== See also ==
- Netherlands in the Eurovision Song Contest 2013
- Netherlands in the Junior Eurovision Song Contest 2013
- List of Dutch Top 40 number-one singles of 2013
- 2013 in Dutch television
