= 1971 in Dutch television =

This is a list of Dutch television related events from 1971.

== Television shows ==
=== 1950s ===
- NOS Journaal (1956–present)
- Pipo de Clown (1958-1980)

== Ending this year ==
- Stiefbeen en Zoon

== Births ==
- 18 January – Peggy Jane de Schepper, actress
- 22 January – Wendy van Dijk, actress & TV presenter
- 31 January – Sylvana Simons, TV & radio presenter
- 10 June – Reinout Oerlemans, actor, director, TV presenter & producer
