= 2012 in Dutch television =

This is a list of Dutch television related events from 2012.

== Events ==
- 20 January - Iris Kroes wins the second series of The Voice of Holland.
- 26 February - Joan Franka is selected to represent Netherlands at the 2012 Eurovision Song Contest with her song "You and Me". She is selected to be the fifty-third Dutch Eurovision entry during Nationaal Songfestival held at Studio 24 in Hilversum.
- 23 March - 13-year-old Fabiënne Bergmans wins the first series of The Voice Kids.
- 1 June - Jump rope team DDF Crew win the fifth series of Holland's Got Talent.
- 13 October - Goede tijden, slechte tijden actor Mark van Eeuwen and his partner Jessica Maybury win the first series of Strictly Come Dancing.
- 14 December - Leona Philippo wins the third series of The Voice of Holland.

== Television shows ==
=== 1950s ===
- NOS Journaal (1956–present)

=== 1970s ===
- Sesamstraat (1976–present)

=== 1980s ===
- Jeugdjournaal (1981–present)
- Het Klokhuis (1988–present)

=== 1990s ===
- Goede tijden, slechte tijden (1990–present)

=== 2000s ===
- X Factor (2006–present)
- Holland's Got Talent (2008–present)

=== 2010s ===
- The Voice of Holland (2010–present)

== Networks and services ==
=== Launches ===
Network	Type	Launch date	Notes	Source
Film1 Drama	Cable television	17 January		
HBO Netherlands	Cable television	9 February		
Film1 Sundance	Cable television	1 March		
FightBox	Cable television	1 June		
24Kitchen	Cable television	12 December		

=== Conversions and rebrandings ===
Old network name	New network name	Type	Conversion Date	Notes	Source
Film 1.3	Film1 Sundance	Cable and satellite	1 March		

=== Closures ===
Network	Type	End date	Notes	Sources
Brava 3D	Cable television	1 August		

== Deaths ==
Date	Name	Age	Cinematic Credibility
19 November	Hannie Lips	88	Dutch broadcaster & television announcer

== See also ==
- 2012 in the Netherlands
