= 1960 in Dutch television =

This is a list of Dutch television related events from 1960.

== Events ==
- 9 February – Rudi Carrell is selected to represent Netherlands at the 1960 Eurovision Song Contest with his song "Wat een geluk". He is selected to be the fifth Dutch Eurovision entry during Nationaal Songfestival held at AVRO Studios in Hilversum.
- 29 March – France wins the Eurovision Song Contest with the song "Tom Pillibi" by Jacqueline Boyer. The Netherlands finish in twelfth place with the song "Wat een geluk" by Rudi Carrell.

== Television shows ==
=== 1950s ===
- Dappere Dodo (1955–1964)
- NOS Journaal (1956–present)
- Pipo de Clown (1958–1980)

== Births ==
- 29 April – Gerard Joling, singer & TV presenter
- 2 May – Hans Schiffers, TV & radio presenter
