= 1962 in Dutch television =

This is a list of Dutch television related events from 1962.

== Events ==
- 27 February – De Spelbrekers are selected to represent Netherlands at the 1962 Eurovision Song Contest with their song "Katinka". They are selected to be the seventh Dutch Eurovision entry during Nationaal Songfestival held at Concordia Theatre in Bussum.
- 18 March – France wins the Eurovision Song Contest with the song "Un premier amour" by Isabelle Aubret. The Netherlands finish in joint thirteenth place with De Spelbrekers' song "Katinka".

== Television shows ==
=== 1950s ===
- Dappere Dodo(1955–1964)
- NOS Journaal (1956–present)
- Pipo de Clown (1958–1980)

== Births ==
- 26 March – Paul de Leeuw, singer, comedian & actor
- 22 July – Cornald Maas, TV presenter
- 29 October – Myrna Goossen, TV & radio presenter
