= 2000 in the Netherlands =

- Decades: 1980s; 1990s; 2000s; 2010s; 2020s
- See also: Other events of 2000; History of the Netherlands

This article lists some of the events that took place in the Netherlands in 2000.

== Incumbents ==
- Monarch: Beatrix
- Prime Minister: Wim Kok

== Events ==
- January 27 - Gerrit Komrij is chosen as poet of the fatherland.
- January 29 - Paul Scheffer's essay on the multicultural drama appears in the NRC Handelsblad.
- February 14 - The first episode of De Bus airs on TV.
- April 22 - Six Flags Holland reopens with 4 new roller-coasters.
- April 23 - Beginning of Emperor Akihito's state visit to the Netherlands.
- May 13 - The Enschede fireworks disaster killed 23 people including four firefighters and injured 950 others. A total of 400 homes were destroyed and 1,500 buildings were subsequently damaged.
- June 22 - A 10-year-old girl is murdered in the Beatrixpark of Schiedam.
- July 2 - France wins the UEFA European Championship by defeating Italy, 2–1 following a golden goal in the final game at the Stadion Feijenoord in Rotterdam, Netherlands.
- September 15 - Expedition Robinson airs for the first time on Dutch TV.
- October 1 - The ban on brothels is lifted.
- October 22 - Communist activist and former secretary of the Red Youth, Lucien van Hoesel dies due to an intracranial hemorrhage.
- December 16 - Beginning of a 3-day revolt in the Graafsewijk neighborhood in 's-Hertogenbosch.
- December 19 - The Hells Angels invade the RTL-studio where TV presenters Frits Barend and Henk van Dorp are criticized for spending too much time on Sam Klepper's funeral, which was under escort of the Hells Angels. They apologize on air.

== Business ==
- March 17 – World Online is floated on the Amsterdam stock exchange
- April 13 - Nina Brink is fired as the chairwoman of the commissary council of World Online

== Sports ==
- 1999–2000 Eredivisie
- 1999–2000 Eerste Divisie
- 1999–2000 KNVB Cup
- April 22 - German Erik Zabel wins the Amstel Gold Race
- May 21 - The Netherlands play their 1000th international hockey match in Amstelveen.
- June 3 - The Women's National Field Hockey Team win the Champions Trophy for a 2nd time.
- June 4 - The Men's National Field Hockey Team win the Champions Trophy for a 5th time.
- June 10 - 2000 UEFA European Football Championship begin, the event is co-hosted by The Netherlands and Belgium.
- June 29 - The Netherlands are eliminated from 2000 UEFA European Football Championship by losing to Italy in the semi-finals on penalties.
- July 2 - 2000 UEFA European Football Championship ends in Rotterdam with France beating Italy in the final, 2-1 after extra time.
- September 19 - Pieter van den Hoogenband wins an Olympic gold medal in Sydney on the 100 freestyle in a record time of 47.84.
- September 30 - The Dutch national men field hockey team beat South Korea in the final to win the Olympic gold medal.
- October 15 - Spaniard Francisco Javier Cortes wins the Amsterdam Marathon

== Births ==
- January 11 – Marrit Steenbergen, swimmer
- January 23 – Kjell Scherpen, footballer
- February 23 – Femke Bol, athlete

== Deaths ==
- March 19 – René Stoute, poet and writer

== See also ==
- 2000 in Dutch television
