= 1975 in Dutch television =

This is a list of Dutch television related events from 1975.

== Events ==
- 26 February – Teach-In are selected to represent Netherlands at the 1975 Eurovision Song Contest with their song "Ding-a-dong". They are selected to be the twentieth Dutch Eurovision entry during Nationaal Songfestival held at Jaarbeurs in Utrecht.
- 22 March – Netherlands wins the 20th Eurovision Song Contest in Stockholm, Sweden. The winning song is "Ding-a-dong", performed by Teach-In.

== Television shows ==
=== 1950s ===
- NOS Journaal (1956–present)
- Pipo de Clown (1958–1980)

== Births ==
- 13 March – Claudia de Breij, comedian, singer & talk show host.
- 8 May – Ruben Nicolai, television presenter.
