= 1972 in Dutch television =

This is a list of Dutch television related events from 1972.

== Events ==
- 22 February – Sandra and Andres are selected at the Nationaal Songfestival held at the Royal Theater Carré in Amsterdam to represent the Netherlands at the 1972 Eurovision Song Contest with their song "Als het om de liefde gaat".
- 25 March – Luxembourg wins the Eurovision Song Contest with the song "Après toi", while the Dutch entry "Als het om de liefde gaat" by Sandra and Andres finishes in fourth place.

== Television shows ==
=== 1950s ===
- NOS Journaal (1956–present)
- Pipo de Clown (1958-1980)

== Births ==
- 30 September – Winston Post, actor, TV & radio presenter & former model
