= 1974 in Dutch television =

This is a list of Dutch television related events from 1974.

== Events ==
- 27 February – Mouth and MacNeal are selected at the Nationaal Songfestival at Jaarbeurs in Utrecht to represent the Netherlands at the 1974 Eurovision Song Contest with their song "I See a Star".
- 6 April – Sweden wins the Eurovision Song Contest 1974 with the song "Waterloo", while the Dutch entry "I See a Star" finishes in third place.

== Television shows ==
=== 1950s ===
- NOS Journaal (1956–present)
- Pipo de Clown (1958-1980)

== Births ==
- 1 February – Fabienne de Vries, TV presenter, actress & singer
- 3 June – Tooske Ragas, actress & TV presenter
- 23 July – Jan Joost van Gangelen, TV presenter & sports journalist
- 9 November – Bridget Maasland, dancer, TV presenter & model
