= Gerrit de Ruiter =

Dutch field hockey player

Personal information
- Nationality: Dutch
- Born: 28 September 1927 Enschede, Netherlands
- Died: 8 January 2010 (aged 82)

Sport
- Sport: Field hockey

Gerrit de Ruiter (28 September 1927 – 8 January 2010) was a Dutch field hockey player. He competed in the men's tournament at the 1960 Summer Olympics.
