= 2022 in Dutch television =

This is a list of events that took place in 2022 related to television in the Netherlands.

== Events ==
- 1 January – Broadcasting associations Ongehoord Nederland and Omroep Zwart become part of the Dutch public broadcasting system.
- 7 January – The first episode of season 12 of The Voice of Holland airs. The season was cancelled on 15 January due to abuse of power and sexual misconduct allegations against crew members of the show.
- 5 March – Fresia Cousiño Arias wins the 22nd season of Wie is de Mol?.
- 26 March – Salar Abassi Abraasi wins Big Brother 2022, the second cooperation season of the Dutch and Belgian version of Big Brother.
- 5 May – Niels Gomperts wins Expeditie Robinson: All Stars.
- 14 May – S10 represents the Netherlands in the final of the Eurovision Song Contest 2022 held in Turin, Italy with the song De diepte.
- 27 May – Steven Brunswijk, Toine van Peperstraten and Dionne Slagter win the second season of De Verraders.
- 11 December – Luna represents the Netherlands at the Junior Eurovision Song Contest 2022 held in Yerevan, Armenia. She finished in 7th place.
- 19 December – Dennis Wilt wins Expeditie Robinson 2022.
- 30 December – Jeroen van der Boom wins the fourth season of The Masked Singer.
- 31 December – Jim Bakkum wins the New Year's Eve Special of The Masked Singer.

== Debuts ==
- 16 January – Van je familie moet je het hebben, game show presented by Leo Alkemade and Leonie ter Braak
- 3 June – Blow Up, game show presented by Martijn Krabbé and Chantal Janzen
- 3 October – The Genius, game show

== Endings ==
- 28 April – SpangaS, youth series

== Networks and services ==
=== Conversions and rebrandings ===
Old network name	New network name	Type	Conversion Date	Notes	Source
Spike	Paramount Network	Cable television	24 May		

=== Closures ===
Network	Type	End date	Notes	Sources
Comedy Central Extra	Cable television	31 December		

== Deaths ==
- 28 July – Leontien Ceulemans, 70, actress and television presenter, complications following a fall.
- 6 December – Bart de Vries, 57, actor (Punk Lawyer, Left Luggage, Het Woeden der Gehele Wereld), COVID-19.
- 13 December – Han Peekel, 75, television presenter, heart failure.
- 25 December – John Leddy, 92, actor (Zeg 'ns Aaa).

== See also ==
- 2022 in the Netherlands
