= 1956 in Dutch television =

This is a list of Dutch television related events from 1956.

== Events ==
- 24 April - Corry Brokken and Jetty Paerl are selected to represent Netherlands at the 1956 Eurovision Song Contest with "Voorgoed voorbij" performed by Brokken and "De vogels van Holland" performed by Paerl. They are selected to be the first Dutch Eurovision entries during Nationaal Songfestival held at the AVRO Studios in Hilversum.
- 24 May - The Netherlands enters the Eurovision Song Contest for the first time with "De vogels van Holland", performed by Jetty Paerl and "Voorgoed voorbij", performed by Corry Brokken.

== Debuts ==
- 5 January - NOS Journaal (1956–present)

== Births ==
- 9 September - Arjan Ederveen, actor, comedian & director
