= List of Dutch films =

This is chronology of films produced in the Netherlands. The films are produced in the Dutch language.

== Lists by decade ==
- List of Dutch films before 1910
- List of Dutch films of the 1910s
- List of Dutch films of the 1920s
- List of Dutch films of the 1930s
- List of Dutch films of the 1940s
- List of Dutch films of the 1950s
- List of Dutch films of the 1960s
- List of Dutch films of the 1970s
- List of Dutch films of the 1980s
- List of Dutch films of the 1990s
- List of Dutch films of the 2000s
- List of Dutch films of the 2010s
- List of Dutch films of the 2020s

== See also ==
- List of years in the Netherlands
- List of years in Dutch television
