= 2021 in Dutch television =

This is a list of events that took place in 2021 related to television in the Netherlands.

== Events ==
- 6 March – Roxanne Hehakaija wins the 21st season of Wie is de Mol?.
- 8 April – Jill Goede wins Big Brother 2021, the first cooperation season of the Dutch and Belgian version of Big Brother.
- 1 May – Samantha Steenwijk and Chatilla van Grinsven win the first season of De Verraders.
- 22 May – The final of the Eurovision Song Contest 2021 is held in Rotterdam, Netherlands. Jeangu Macrooy represents the Netherlands with the song Birth of a New Age.
- 24 September – Vanessa Van Cartier wins the second season of Drag Race Holland.
- 17 December – Jamai Loman wins the third season of The Masked Singer.
- 19 December – Robbert Rodenburg wins Expeditie Robinson 2021.
- 19 December – Ayana represents the Netherlands at the Junior Eurovision Song Contest 2021 held in Paris, France. She finished in 19th place.

== Debuts ==
- 13 March – De Verraders, television show presented by Tijl Beckand
- 24 March – Kinderen kopen ideale huis, show presented by Leonie ter Braak in which children, rather than the parents, choose a home to purchase.
- 23 April – First & Last, game show presented by Britt Dekker and Martien Meiland
- 23 July – Game of Talents, game show presented by Tijl Beckand and Julie Van den Steen
- 6 September – HLF8, talk show

== Networks and services ==
=== Launches ===
Network	Type	Launch date	Notes	Source
HGTV	Cable television	21 January		
NickMusic	Cable television	1 June		
MTV 00s	Cable television	2 August		

=== Conversions and rebrandings ===
Old network name	New network name	Type	Conversion Date	Notes	Source
NPO Politiek	NPO Politiek en Nieuws	Cable television	15 December		

=== Closures ===
Network	Type	End date	Notes	Sources
MTV Brand New	Cable television	1 February		
MTV Music 24	Cable television	26 May		
VH1 Europe	Cable television	2 August		
NPO Zappelin Extra	Cable television	15 December		

== See also ==
- 2021 in the Netherlands
