= Stan Haag =

Australian rules footballer

Personal information
- Full name: Stan Haag
- Born: 6 February 1943
- Original team: Valley United
- Height: 184 cm (6 ft 0 in)
- Weight: 76 kg (168 lb)

Playing career^{1}
Years	Club	Games (Goals)
1963	Fitzroy	4 (1)
- ^{1} Playing statistics correct to the end of 1963.

Stan Haag (born 6 February 1943) is a former Australian rules footballer who played with Fitzroy in the Victorian Football League (VFL).
