= De Club van Sinterklaas =

Dutch children's television series

- Created by: Michiel Kerbosch and others
- Starring: Bram van der Vlugt; Don van Dijke; Wim Schluter; Beryl van Praag; Tim de Zwart; Piet van der Pas; Harold Verwoert; Michiel Kerbosch; Peter de Gelder and others
- Country of origin: Netherlands
- No. of episodes: +/- 236 total

Production
- Running time: Television: 10 minutes per episode Movies: 75 minutes per episode

Original release
- Network: Fox Kids (1999–2004); Jetix (2005–2008); RTL 4 (2009)
- Release: 1 November 1999 – 4 December 2009

De Club van Sinterklaas (English literal title: The Club of Sinterklaas, international title: St. Nicholas & Friends) is a Dutch seasonal children's telenovella between 1999 and 2009 based on the legend of Sinterklaas and Zwarte Piet. Since 2010, De club van Sinterklaas continues as a YouTube channel and a film series.

The series attracted mass popularity in the Netherlands during its television running time. Several of the series theme songs charted in the Dutch Single Top 100 and its 2005 and 2006 theme songs even topped the charts. It became the only Sinterklaas-related children's programme to be ever nominated for a Gouden Stuiver, where it lost out to Het Huis Anubis.

In the wake of the zwartepietendiscussie, the original series was disregarded by its right holders RTL Nederland due to the use of black face paint on white actors and the traditional depiction of Zwarte Piet.

== Premise ==
The series follows a group of Zwarte Pieten on their misadventures on their yearly journey to the Netherlands. The series has a different subtitle every year in relation to the plot of the year.

== Depiction of Zwarte Piet ==
The practice of face painting white actors with black face paint was well-accepted in Dutch society until the late 2000s. However, in the early 2010s, in the wake of the zwartepietendiscussie, De club van Sinterklaas became one of the first Dutch television series to stop this practice and introduced the 'soot' version of the character in 2017. As the debate continued, RTL decided to remove the older series from its streaming platform Videoland as well as removing all the content prior to 2017 from De club van Sinterklaas YouTube channel. Earlier on, VEVO had removed all the music videos from the SinterklaasVEVO channel.

== Cast ==
=== Main ===
- Sinterklaas - Bram van der Vlugt (1999-2009)
- Wegwijspiet - Michiel Kerbosch (1999-2005)
- Chefpiet - Don van Dijke (1999-2002, 2005)
- Muziekpiet - Win Schluter (1999-present)
- Hooge Hoogtepiet- Tim de Zwart (2001, 2003-2020)
- Testpiet - Beryl van Praag (2001-present)
- Coole Piet - Harold Verwoert (2001-2007, 2009-2011)
- Profpiet- Piet van der Pas (2003-present)
- Hulppiet- Titus Boonstra (2004-2011)

=== Supporting ===
- Meneer de Directeur - Tim de Zwart (2002-2004)
- Jacob - Peter de Gelder (2003-2005)
- Tante Toets - Maja van den Broecke (2005)
