= Dappere Dodo =

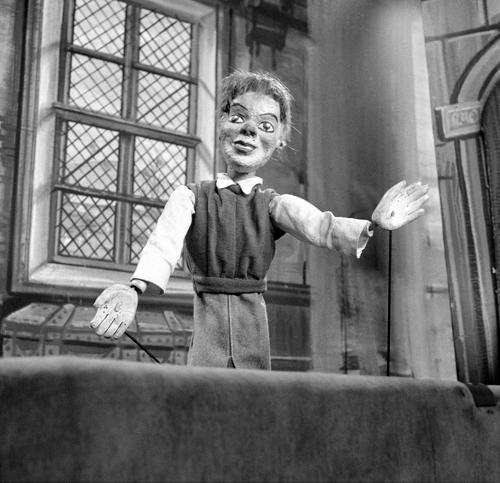
- Dappere Dodo in 1956
- Genre: Children's television series
- Created by: Bert Brugman
- Voices of: Jaap Brugman
- Country of origin: Netherlands
- No. of seasons: 9
- No. of episodes: 75

Original release
- Network: KRO
- Release: February 3, 1955 – April 20, 1964

Dappere Dodo is a Dutch children's television puppet show, which was broadcast on KRO between 1955 and 1964. The program revolved around the boy 'Dappere Dodo', who has adventures with his friends.
