= Stiefbeen en Zoon =

Dutch television series

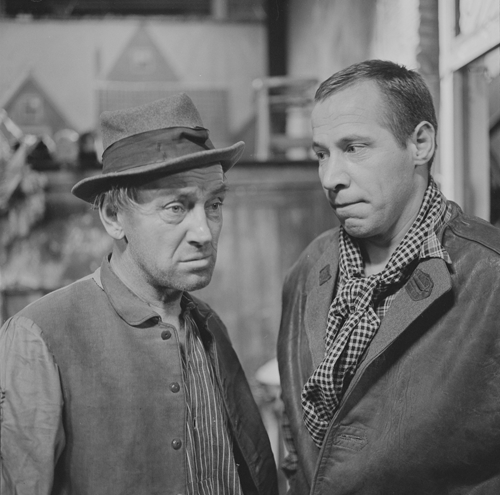
- Rien van Nunen and Piet Römer as Stiefbeen and son (1963)
- Genre: Sitcom
- Based on: Steptoe and Son
- Starring: Rien van Nunen; Piet Römer
- Country of origin: Netherlands
- Original language: Dutch

Original release
- Network: NCRV
- Release: 11 October 1963 – 1971

Stiefbeen en zoon is a Dutch sitcom television series that ran on the NCRV television network from January 14, 1963, to March 25, 1977. It is based on the British sitcom Steptoe and Son, which initially aired on BBC One in the United Kingdom from 1962 to 1974. The series was awarded the very first Golden Televizier Ring in 1964.
