= Soundmixshow =

Dutch talent show

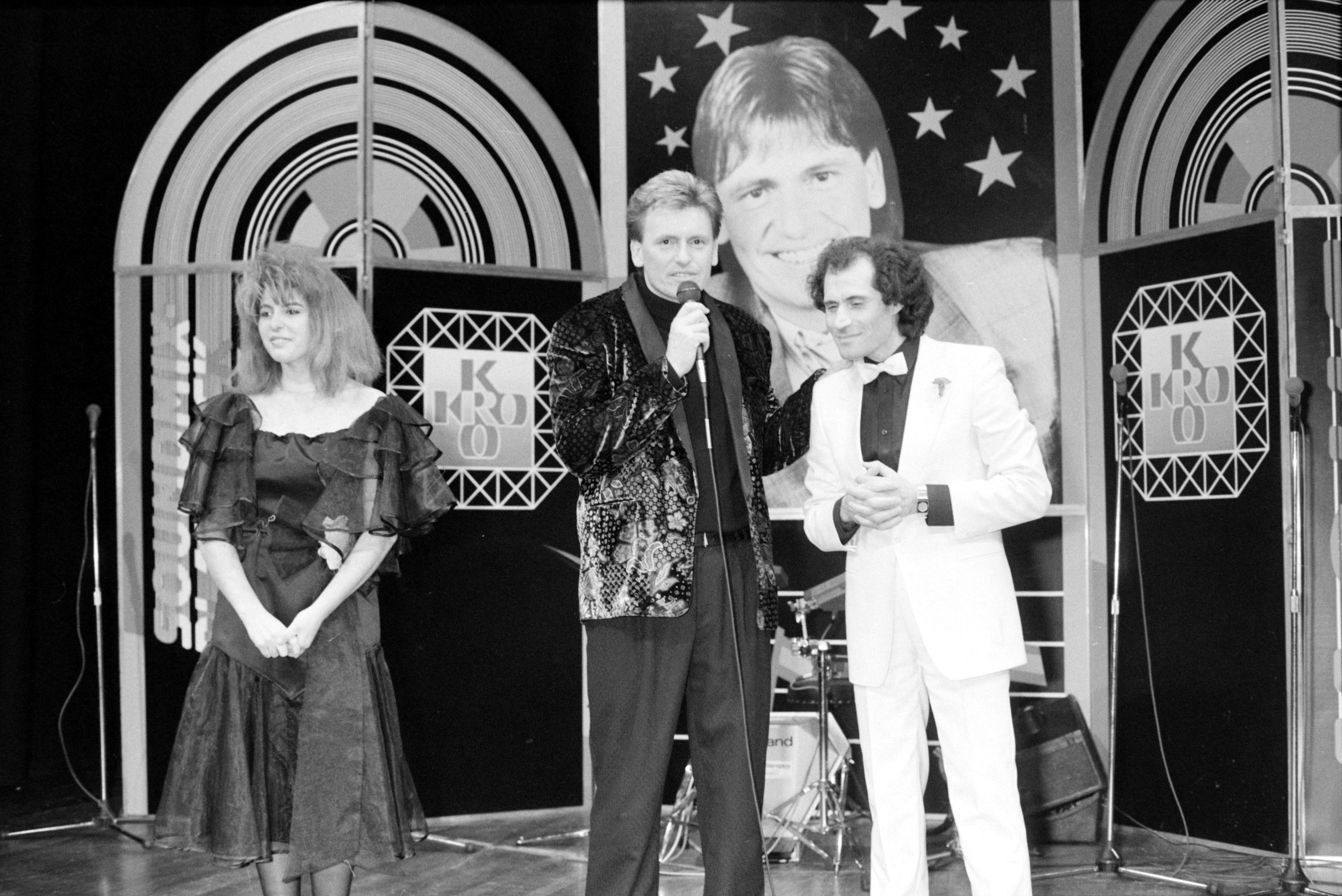
- Soundmixshow with Henny Huisman and an imitation of Julio Iglesias, 1987
- Created by: Joop van den Ende
- Presented by: Henny Huisman
- Country of origin: Netherlands
- Original language: Dutch
- No. of seasons: 18

Production
- Production company: Endemol

Original release
- Network: KRO (1985–1989); RTL 4 (1990–2002)
- Release: 17 November 1985 – 27 April 2002

Related
- Stars in Their Eyes; European Soundmix Show; Your Face Sounds Familiar

Soundmixshow is a Dutch talent show which was a live-vocals version of the Playback Show. It aired from 17 November 1985 to 27 April 2002 and was hosted by Henny Huisman. The format has since been sold to other countries, notably as the European Soundmix Show.

== History ==
=== Early days ===
Huisman, former drummer of 1970s band Lucifer and spin-off group Match, went on a tour in early 1980s with his Hitkrant Drive-In Show; this prototype-version of the Playback Show was a joint venture with weekly pop agazine Hitkrant in which he had a column. In 1983, Huisman brought the format on television during the summer-evening slot as Zomeravondshow by KRO. Contestants performed on a hit-or-miss basis.

=== Breakthrough ===
In 1984, the name was changed to Playbackshow and contestants were now given full performance time. Shortly afterwards, Huisman decided to do a spin-off with real vocals, thus Soundmixshow was born with artists being judged by a jury of three professionals, notably Jacques d'Ancona and Barrie Stevens; the latter's "Vooral doorgaan!" (lit. 'Keep up the good work!') became a catchphrase.

The Soundmixshow meant a breakthrough for several young Dutch artists, as it was a platform with a relative low threshold and a broad audience. It was first produced by Endemol for Katholieke Radio Omroep (KRO) before moving to RTL 4 from 1990 until 2002.

In the finals of 1988, Huisman asked viewers to phone a specific number for televoting. However, this caused such a big amount of phone calls, that the whole telephone grid was down for a while, and even the emergency services (police, ambulance, firefighters) were out of reach in some parts of the country.

=== Other spin-offs ===
From late 1980s until early 1990s, Huisman presented the Miniplaybackshow as a platform for children. A tie-in series titled Minisoundmixshow was announced, but it never happened. There was also a Seniorenplaybackshow with elder contestants, and the more successful Sterrensoundmixshow (Celebrity Stars In Their Eyes).

In 2002, the Soundmixshow was the platform for a debate between politicians just before the parliamental elections. That same year, the format was discontinued in favor of Idols and other talent contests. Huisman reunited with former Soundmixshow-contestants on KRO's anniversary-programme in 2010. He used the backdrop whilst playing himself in a children's movie chronicling the events of two aspiring popstars. In 2014, Huisman appeared on the Showtime programme to revisit his time as presenter of Soundmixshow.

== Successful contestants ==
- Kate Ryan
- Petra Berger
- Marco Borsato
- Tooske Breugem
- Georgie Davis
- Glennis Grace
- Gerard Joling
- Helmut Lotti
- Désirée Manders
- Edsilia Rombley

== List of winners ==
Year	Artist	Original artist	Song	Additional information
1985	Glenda Peters	Randy Crawford	One Day I'll Fly Away	Gerard Joling was third this year
1986	Gina De Wit	Linda Ronstadt	Desperado	
1986	Frank Ashton	Tony Christie	Don't Go Down To Reno	
1987	Peter Douglas	Frank Sinatra	New York, New York	
1988	Jos Van den Brom	John Denver	Leaving on a Jet Plane	Desirée Manders made her TV debut. This was in a legendary final, where people could televote, but because of the huge number of votes, the whole phone grid was down.
1989	Carina Bos	Timi Yuro	Hurt	Helmut Lotti was also contestant. Last season broadcast on KRO
1990	Marco Borsato	Billy Vera	At This Moment	First season broadcast by RTL 4
1991	Jorge Castro	Luciano Pavarotti	Caruso	Kathleen Prattis sang as Anita Baker, Watch Your Step.
1992	Nhelly Dela Rosa	Shirley Bassey	This Is My Life	
1993	Ellen Fransz	Whitney Houston	I will always love you	
1994	Glennis Grace	Whitney Houston	One Moment In Time	
1995	Arno Kolenbrander	Simon Bowman (from the musical Miss Saigon)	Why God, Why	Tooske Breugem was also contestant
1996	Edsilia Rombley	Oleta Adams	I Just Had to Hear Your Voice	
1997	Mary Ann Morales	Lea Salonga (from Miss Saigon)	The Movie in My Mind	
1998	Cherwin Muringen	Seal	Kiss from a Rose	Floortje Smit was also contestant
1999	Erna Hemming	Emma Shapplin	Spente Le Stelle	
2000	Bart Schwertman	Ian Gillan (from the rock-opera Jesus Christ Superstar)	Ghetsemane	
2001	Mary Amora	Tina Turner	River Deep, Mountain High	
2002	Valerie Dwarkasing	Alicia Keys	Fallin'	

== International versions ==
Country	Local name	Channel	Hosts	Broadcast
Australia	StarStruck	Nine Network	Larry Emdur; Catriona Rowntree	2005
Belgium	VTM soundmixshow (in Dutch)	VTM	Bart Kaëll (1989–2000); Kürt Rogiers (2000)	1989–1995; 1997–2000
Belgium	De Nieuwe Soundmixshow (in Dutch)	VT4	Jo De Poorter	1996
Belgium	Star ce soir (in French)	RTL-TVI	Frédéric Herbays	1997–2002
Denmark	Stjerneskud	TV3	Anders Frandsen	1995
Germany	Mini Playback Show	RTL	Marijke Amado (1990–1998); Jasmin Wagner (1998)	1990–1998
Germany	Soundmix Show	RTL	Linda de Mol	1995–1997
Greece	Soundmix Show	Alpha TV	Natalia Germanou; Nikos Moutsinas	2006–2007
Hungary	Kifutó	TV2	András Csonka	1998
Italy	Re per una notte Re per una notte VIP; Re per una notte bambini	Italia 1	Gigi Sabani	1994–1996
Italy	Momenti di gloria	Canale 5	Mike Bongiorno	1999–2000
Italy	Sei un mito	Canale 5	Roberta Capua	2005
Italy	È nata una stella gemella	Canale 5	Lorella Cuccarini	2008
Norway	Med blikket mot stjernene	TV3	Ragnar Otnes	1995
Norway	Stjerner i sikte	TV 2	Jahn Teigen	1996–1999
New Zealand	Stars in Their Eyes	TV One	Simon Barnett	2008–2009
Poland	Zostań gwiazdą	TVN	Krzysztof Ibisz	1998–1999
Portugal	Chuva de Estrelas	SIC	Catarina Furtado (1993–1994); José Nuno Martins (1995–1996); Bárbara Guimarães (1997–2000)	1993–2000
Spain	Lluvia de estrellas	Antena 3	Bertín Osborne	1995–2001
Spain	Lluvia de estrellas	La 1	Sonia Ferrer	2007
Sweden	Sikta mot stjärnorna	TV4	Lasse Holm (1994–1997); Agneta Sjödin (1999–2000, 2002); Paul Tilly (2002)	1994–1997; 1999–2000; 2002
Sweden	Småstjärnorna (kids version)	TV4	Agneta Sjödin (1995–1999); Martin Timell (2000–2001); Pernilla Wahlgren (2003)	1995–2001; 2003
United Kingdom	Stars in Their Eyes	ITV	Leslie Crowther (1990–1992); Russ Abbot (1993 Elvis special); Matthew Kelly (1993–2004); Davina McCall (2003 specials); Cat Deeley (2004–2006); Harry Hill (2015)	1990–2006; 2015
United Kingdom	Stars in Their Eyes: Kids	ITV	Matthew Kelly (2001–2002); Cat Deeley (2003–2004, 2006)	2001 (pilot); 2002–2004; 2006
United States	Performing As…	Fox	Todd Newton	2003

Spain's Antena 3 created a similar format, under the title Tu cara me suena, in 2011. A UK version of this was also produced by ITV in 2013 and, like Stars in Their Eyes and Soundmixshow, is also a format owned by Endemol Shine Group. Another similar format, Starstruck, was launched by ITV in 2022.
