= Sesamstraat =

Dutch children's television series

- A picture from the original opening of Sesamstraat, 1976
- Genre: Educational, sketch comedy, puppet show, animation
- Based on: Sesame Street
- Countries of origin: Netherlands (1976–2019); Belgium (1976–1983)
- Original language: Dutch

Production
- Production companies: NOS; Sesame Workshop

Original release
- Network: NOS (1976–1995); NPS (1995–2010); NTR (2010–2019)
- Release: 4 January 1976 – 2019

Sesamstraat (Dutch pronunciation: [ˈseːzɑmˌstraːt]) is a Dutch children's television series in the Netherlands, and a localized version of the U.S. children's program Sesame Street. In its early days, the show was broadcast in Flanders (Belgium) as well. It is the second longest-running foreign adaptation of Sesame Street without interruptions, behind only Sesamstraße. It targets children between 3–7 years old.

== History ==
After a pilot episode entitled Sesamplein ("Sesame Square") which was released in 1974, Sesamstraat began broadcasting in 1976. It started as a Dutch/Belgian co-production, with only one thirty-minute episode a week. These episodes had only 12 minutes allotted for the Dutch cast. At the time, there were only two Muppets and three live actors (Piet Hendriks, Sien Diels, and Annet van Heusden). Piet owned a hobby and crafts workshop and a camper which he would drive around The Netherlands and Belgium for live trips. Sien owned a grocery store, where the exchange of knowledge and happenings were as important as the selling of products. Annet played a kindergarten teacher. In 1978, the show's format changed to a daily 15 minute show that aired in the evening, around dinnertime.

The first season was shot on location in a half Dutch, half Belgian town. It was broadcast every Sunday for a half-hour in the afternoon. For the second season, a realistic town square was built inside the studio, which slowly evolved into a more abstracted, colorful town, featuring Pino's nest, Sien's store, a workshop, two houses, an apartment building, a trailer and a treehouse. The insides of the house sets could be decorated in different ways, so that the viewers would never be certain about who lived where.

Other special Sesamstraat episodes include the 2500th episode, and a yearly special episode focused on Sinterklaas. The 25th anniversary of the series featured guest appearances on the street by Dutch celebrities. On 7 January 2000, Prime Minister Wim Kok read the daily story "Er staat een olifantje in het gras..." (There is a little elephant standing in the grass) for the Muppet residents before they went to sleep. Wim Kok is one of the many prominent guests who read a story to them. (Normally this was done by Frank, Gerda or Paula). Other celebrities that have made guest appearances include Freek de Jonge (comedian), Ruud Gullit (professional soccer player), André van Duin (comedian), Mary Dresselhuys (actress), Hans Dagelet (actor), Kees van Kooten (writer), Brigitte Kaandorp (comedian), Sonja Barend (show host) and Janine Kastelijn (Youth Winner for Reading in 2000).

In 1992, a 30-minute film, Sesamstraat en Melkweg, was produced for the Artis Zoo Planetarium in Amsterdam.

In 2005, the show saw some schedule trouble. The government decided to halt the funding and broadcasts of NPS. The final debate took place on 12 September 2005, in the Tweede Kamer. It was decided that NPS could continue making programs, but it had to make several changes to fit into modern television, including a new broadcast schedule.

For the 2005/2006 season, Sesamstraat moved into new scenery. The set became completely abstract, with toy block-like buildings, broccoli for trees, and a tower with a giant light-up clock. The scenery was introduced with a TV special. Bert, Ernie, Cookie Monster, and Elmo flew over to the Netherlands for this special occasion. It was the first time the American characters visited the Dutch street.

Starting in September 2006, Sesamstraat expanded to 30 minutes and began airing three times a day.

In 2008, the show received 15 minutes of extra broadcast time a day. This meant there was room for two more Muppets. Angsthaas The Hare and Stuntkip The Chicken were introduced.

October 2009 brought a new segment for the show. Several famous Dutch singers performed duets with the Sesamstraat characters Pino, Tommie, Ieniemienie and Purk. All songs were written by Henny Vrienten. The segments aired every Friday starting 30 October 2009. Among the artists were Trijntje Oosterhuis, Caro Emerald, André van Duin, Edsilia Rombley, Ernst Daniël Smid, Hind, Guus Meeuwis, Huub van der Lubbe and Willeke Alberti. All the duets were broadcast again in a special on 25 and 28 December.

On 28 June 2019, The NTR made public that they had to economize again and decided to stop producing the series for the following two years. Reruns were broadcast instead.

== Characters ==
=== Muppet characters ===
==== Pino ====
Pino is one of the most important Muppets in the children's program, and has been a part of the central cast since the show started airing in 1976. He has the appearance of a giant blue bird whose design closely resembles that of Big Bird, who is his cousin. At approximately 4 years old he is a little younger than his friends Tommie and Ieniemienie, and sometimes he has a little trouble keeping up with them. Pino is shy, sensitive, and sometimes clumsy in his childish naivety. Being the second youngest, he likes to play with Purk. He is best known for his funny laugh and his catchphrase "Echt waar?!" ("Really?!").

Pino has had many different performers through the years, including Dirk Grijspeirt (1976), Theo Joling (1977), Bert Plagman (1979), Erik J. Meijer (1980) and Leo Dijkgraaf (1984). In 1991, Renée Menschaar started performing Pino, and she has been his regular performer ever since. She is the first woman to play Pino, who has always remained a boy character.

==== Tommie ====
Tommie is a six-year-old dog. He is clever, energetic and creative. Tommie can write a few words, including his own name, which he is very proud of. He is famous for his own made up exclamations, like "Poe hee!" (approximately pronounced as: pooh hey) and "Hatseflats!". In the 2005/2006 season, Tommie got his own racing car.

Tommie has been around since the beginning in 1976. The first Tommie puppet was made by producer Ton Hasebos from an old fur coat. He was a teddy bear-like creature that walked on all fours. Through the years he evolved from a 'teddy bear' kind of creature to a more doglike animal. Tommie's recent look, which was introduced in 1981, was designed by The Jim Henson Company. The recently refurbished Tommie has a lot more fur in his face.

Like Pino, Tommie has had a few different performers, including Stef van der Linden in 1976 and Martin Pragt in 1978. In 1979, Bert Plagman became Tommie's performer, after sharing the part with Martin. Renée Menschaar (Pino's performer) and Judith Broersen (Purk's performer) both started their Sesamstraat careers as Tommie's right hand. Nowadays, Daphne Zandberg performs Tommie's right hand.

==== Ieniemienie ====
Representing the psychological age of a six-year-old mouse, Ieniemienie is the oldest of the group. She is very clever and smart-alecky, and sometimes she tends to be a little bossy. Her best friend is Tommie. Being the smallest rodent on Sesamstraat, she often hangs out with Pino. Ienie is famous for her giggle, as well as her signature movements like scrunching her nose when she's angry or raising her shoulders when she's confused.

Ieniemienie was introduced in 1980. She started out as a mouse who lived in a hole. Through the years, when female emancipation wasn't as much as an issue on the street, her personality became more childlike and girlish.

The puppet has been refurbished a few times, but without drastic changes; except for the 1996 anniversary special, in which Ieniemienie's legs were shown for the first time, during a stiltwalking scene.

Ieniemienie's performer is Catherine van Woerden. Her arm rods are manipulated by either Marijke Koek or Lindai Boogerman.

==== Troel ====
Troel is a fluffy white girl poodle. She is very feminine and a little naïve, and she speaks in a high-pitched voice. Troel is the girlfriend of Tommie.

Troel was introduced during the second season in 1977 as the first girl Muppet to star with Tommie and Pino. She was designed to look like a female version of Tommie.

Troel was performed by Marijke Boon.

Even though the viewers had no problems with her, the producers found her too feminine for a show that dealt with female emancipation, so she disappeared after a year. A newspaper article mentions another reason for her disappearance: her performer didn't get paid as much as the male performers.

Troel was replaced by Ieniemienie a couple of years later.

The Dutch word "Troel" means "dear" or "sweetheart" in a more informal, sometimes even negative way.

==== Purk ====
Purk is a baby piglet who wears a diaper and a little bow in her ear. She is clumsy and messy and loves to get herself dirty. She is still learning how to talk, and she can't walk yet. She is taken care of by everyone on Sesamstraat.

Introduced in 2003, Purk is the newest of the Muppet characters. She was created in order to introduce the subject of "a younger child in the family". While the Dutch wanted her to be fat, they felt that Purk should not be too fat due to the issue of obesity. It took three years for Sesame Workshop to approve the character. The actual puppet was based on a drawing by Sesamstraat actor and mime artist Hakim Traïda.

Purk debuted in a Sesamstraat "Sinterklaas" special as a surprise. In the special, Tommie runs away from Sesamstraat, after the adults gave his stuffed crocodile to Purk. Before the taping of the special, Sesamstraat organised a press convention about Purk's 'birth', hosted by Tommie and Ieniemienie.

Purk was designed by Ed Christie and built by Rollie Krewson.

=== Humans in Sesamstraat ===
- Buurman Baasje, a grumpy neighbour from the Maanzaadstraat (Poppy Seed Street), hating being disturbed by the people (and especially the Muppets) of Sesamstraat. His (nick)name means literally "Neighbour Bossy", being so called because in his first episode (in 2003) he encountered Tommie with the word "baasje". Since then everyone calls him like that, although his real name is Drommels. Buurman Baasje is Sesamstraat's equivalent of Oscar The Grouch, and he is played by Martin van Waardenberg.
- Elvan (Elvan Akyıldız) was introduced in 1997, taking over the role of a teenage character from Lot.
- Frank (Frank Groothof) joined in 1983, in the role of a naughty young guy. Later he became more a kind of funny uncle towards the children.
- Gerda, (Gerda Havertong), joined in 1984, as a nice aunt. Since 1997 Gerda became a less seen character, while the actress Gerda Havertong took up the role of Gerda's sister Peetje, a funny Surinamese lady who is always using naughty tricks on everyone.
- Hakim (Hakim Traïda) joined in 1984. He is an often silent mime character, often in his own inserts. In his first episodes he never talked, but later he was more seen in stories in the street and spoke more.
- Lot (Lot Lohr) joined in 1988, taking over the role of a teenage character (often referred as "Lotje" by meneer Aart). Since 1995 she is more in the role of a working mother, often seen behind a laptop.
- Lex (Lex Goudsmit), a grandpa figure from 1984 until his death in 1999.
- Meneer Aart (Aart Staartjes) debuted in 1984. His role was that of a mildly cranky old man who would grumble at the childish antics of the muppet cast, and who would sometimes complain about how the old days used to be better. He was introduced as a foil after one of the scenario writers remarked that the show was too saccharine (referring to Sesamstraat as "a paradise without a snake"), nonetheless he became a well-loved character among the people who grew up with him. Meneer Aart demanded to be called "Meneer Aart" (Mr. Aart) and he saw himself as the most important man of the street. Since the death of Lex, Aart has sometimes taken up the role of a grandpa. Just like the other characters he doesn't like Buurman Baasje. He always calls Pino "Piño". Aart Staartjes' performance of Mr. Aart was loved by many and he continued to perform this character for over 40 years until his death on 12 January 2020.
- Paula (Paula Sleijp) joined in 1982. Her role is some kind of grandma, but since 1996 in a more stern way. In the 1990s Paula Sleijp also played the character of the Baroness, a silly and dumb lady with a French accent. After 28 years, she left the show in 2010.
- Rik (Rik Hoogendoorn) debuted in 1993 as Mr. Aart's nephew (although he never calls Aart his uncle). Rik is a clumsy young man, trying to do silly inventions, which often do not work. He is also a thick man, who enjoys eating and hates sports. He left the cast in 2007.
- Sien (Sien Diels) was already in the first episode in 1976. She runs a store. In the first seasons she was often wearing overalls and using tools, because of the focus on female emancipation.

== See also ==
- Hellen Huisman (female voiceovers for Sesamstraat, including Prairie Dawn)
- Wim T. Schippers (voiceovers, most notably Kermit the Frog and Ernie)
- Paul Haenen (voiceovers, most notably Grover and Bert)
- Fabeltjeskrant (another Dutch children's television series featuring puppetry)
