= Het Klokhuis =

Dutch educational television show

Het Klokhuis (Dutch for "The Applecore") is a daily documentary show for primary school children and young teenagers produced by NTR of the Netherlands. It first aired on 3 January 1988. It is broadcast every weekday at 18:45 on NPO 3 and lasts about 15 minutes. The subjects vary widely. Quite often, factories are visited, where a complete production process is explained. The informative parts are interspersed with sketches, which sometimes have aspects that only adults would understand, whilst still remaining entertaining for children.

In 1990, there were plans to discontinue the show due to high costs, but after protests and questions asked in the Dutch parliament, it was decided to keep the show. In a later year, a bill was made to discontinue the production company, which endangered the show again, but the fall of the Dutch parliament on June 30, 2006 put a halt to this and the show continued running.

In 2013, Het Klokhuis celebrated 25 years. For this occasion, the viewers were asked to vote for their favorite episode, to create a top ten with the best episode. This top ten was broadcast in a special three-hour program. After this, there was a live show, in which guests who had made, presented or cooperated with Het Klokhuis were interviewed live.

Multiple sketches and characters have recurring appearances, but the most notable and longest running sketch is Het Klokhuis Kantoor ("The Applecore Office"), which always airs on Mondays. It revolves around a fictional office where four employees are running the show. The office scenes are interspersed with informative parts, usually relating to the preceding office scene. The fictional team originally consisted of Ben Kokkelman (the boss, loosely based on Klokhuis creator Ben Klokman), Wouter, Timo and Leonoor. They were portrayed by Gijs de Lange, Rogier in 't Hout, Sergio IJssel, and Anniek Pheifer, respectively. In 2022, due to de Lange's death, Kantoor episodes were put on hold, and fellow actors in 't Hout, IJssel and Pheifer pitched to the writers to turn Kantoor episode 301 into a tribute to de Lange, where Ben wrote a letter to the remaining employees, saying he decided to quit his job and take a job elsewhere, and to "go visit sad places to make people laugh, because that's the purpose of life: making people laugh." Soon after, in 't Hout, IJssel and Pheifer decided they didn't want to continue the characters without de Lange, so in Kantoor episode 302, the remaining employees decided to go on a trip around the world, while passing the torch to the next team of employees: Heleen, Peggy, Luuk and Rodîn (portrayed by Maria Kraakman, Sarah Janneh, Rop Verheijen and Sidar Toksöz, respectively).
