= Golden Harp =

Dutch music award

The Golden Harp (Dutch: Gouden Harp) is awarded annually to Dutch musicians for their entire oeuvre. Golden Harps have been awarded 42 times. 149 different persons or (musical) groups have had the honour of receiving the award which is considered to be one of the most important prizes in Dutch music.

== Background ==
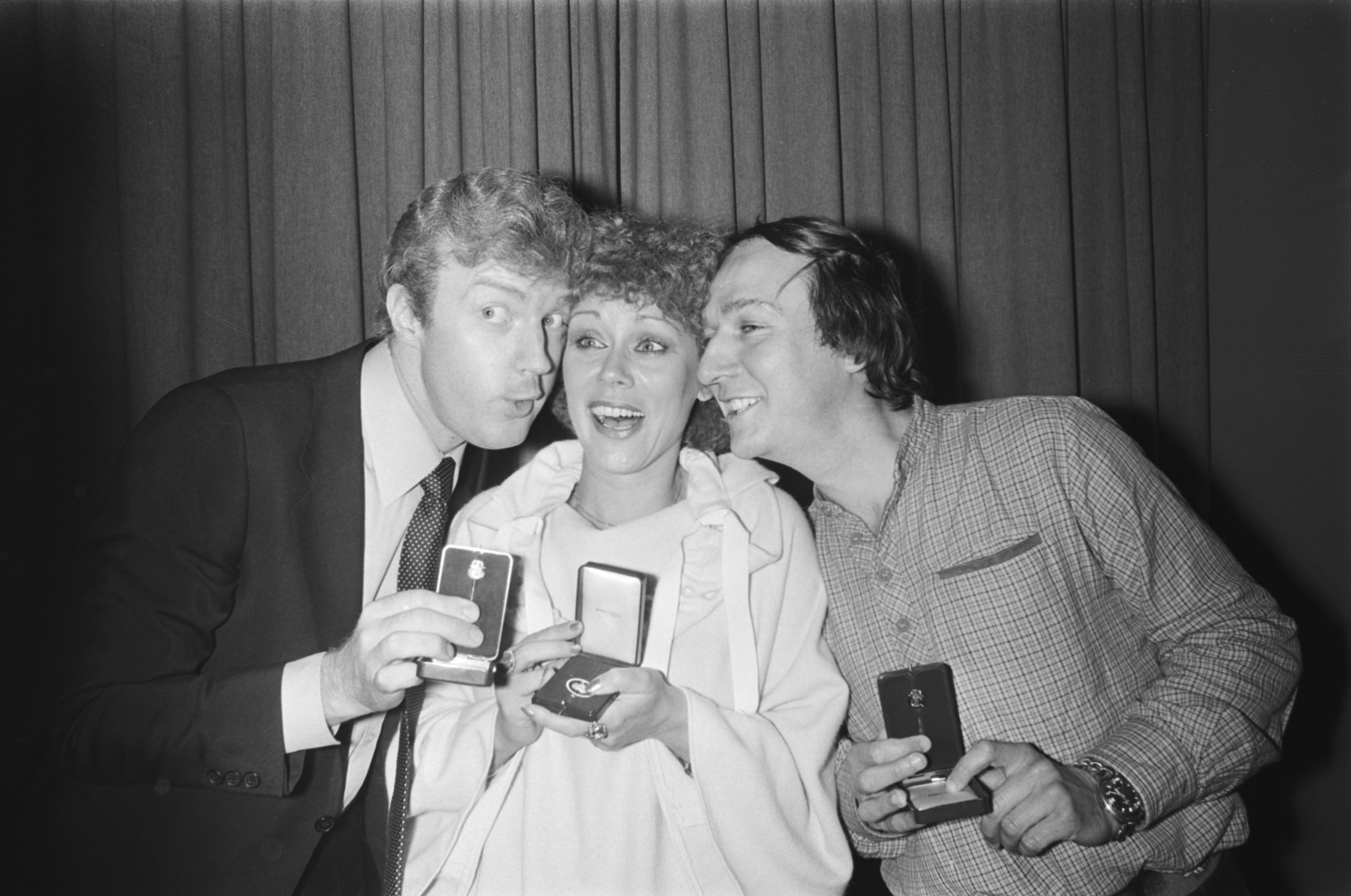
The Golden Harp in 1977

The awards were first presented in 1962.

The prize is intended for a musician's entire oeuvre. The website of Buma Cultuur states the following: "Considered for this award are persons who have made themselves particularly meritorious for Dutch light music throughout their careers."^{[i]}

Apart from 1963 and 1964 award ceremonies were held every year since the first presentation in 1962. The winners are selected by a different jury each year, usually in February. Buma Cultuur also presents the Zilveren Harp award, which is given to promising Dutch musical talent and the Buma Export Award for acts which are successful abroad.

== List of winners ==
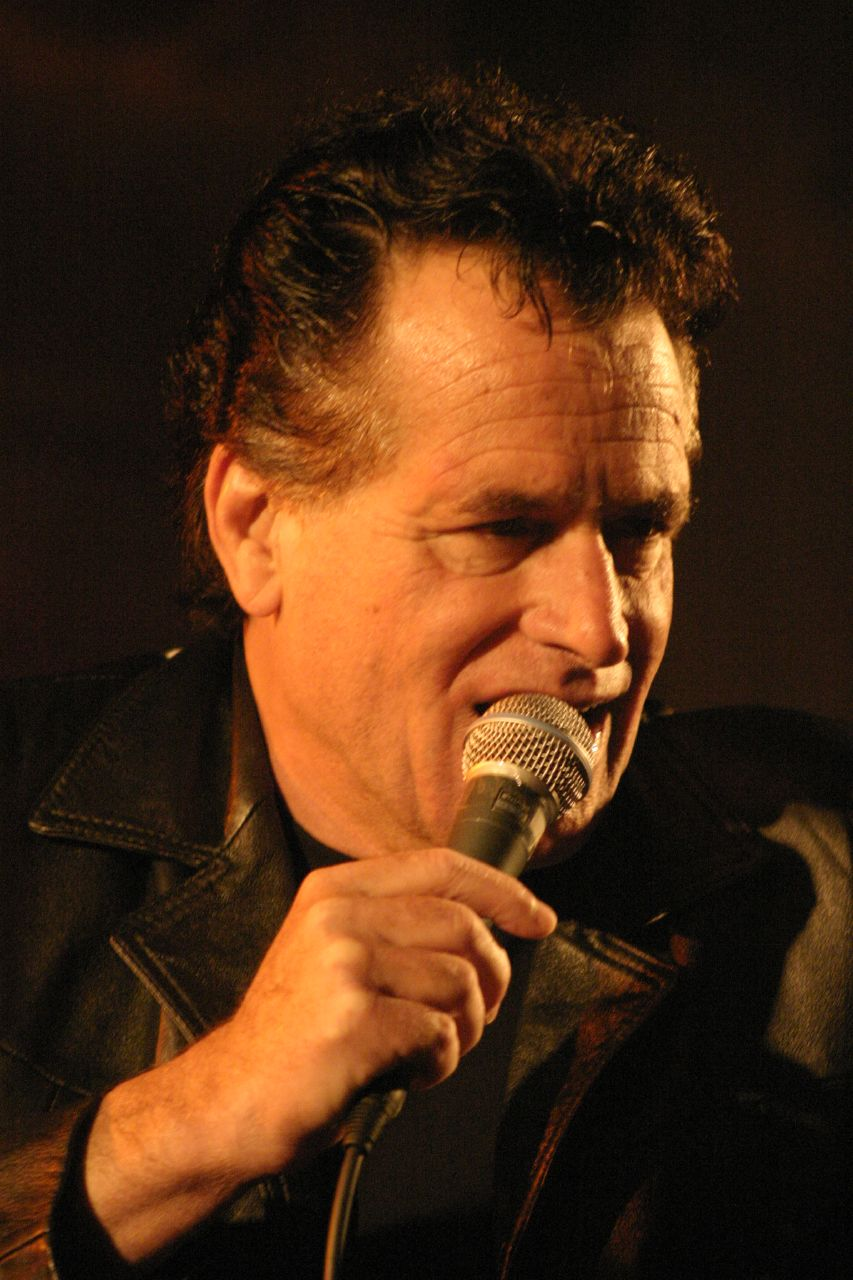
George Baker, 1976 winner

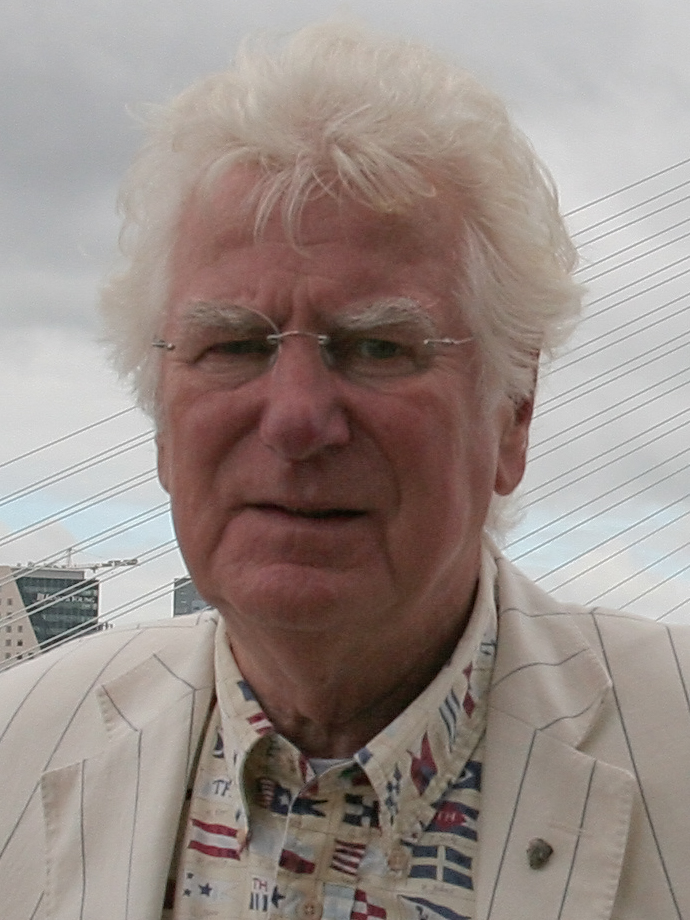
Gerard Cox, 1989 winner

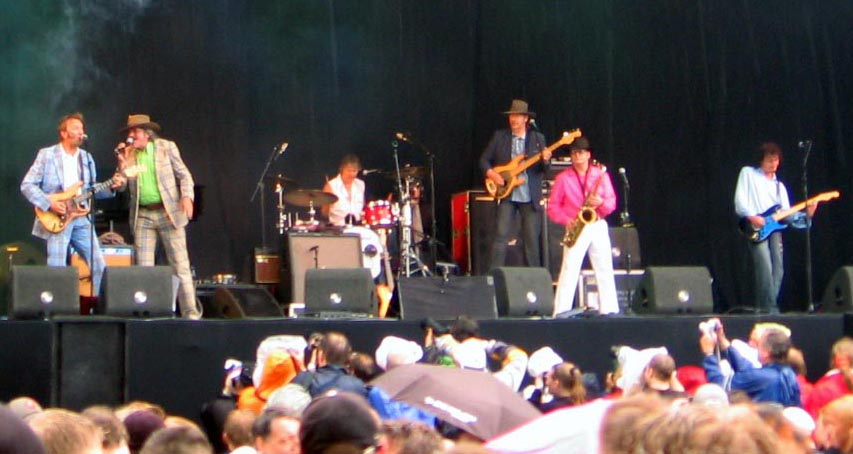
Normaal, 1992 winner

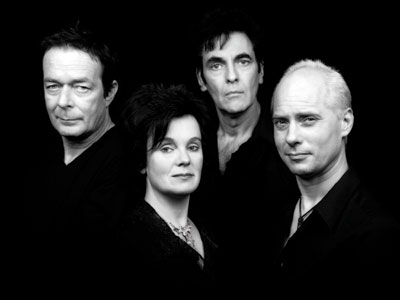
The Scene, 1996 winner

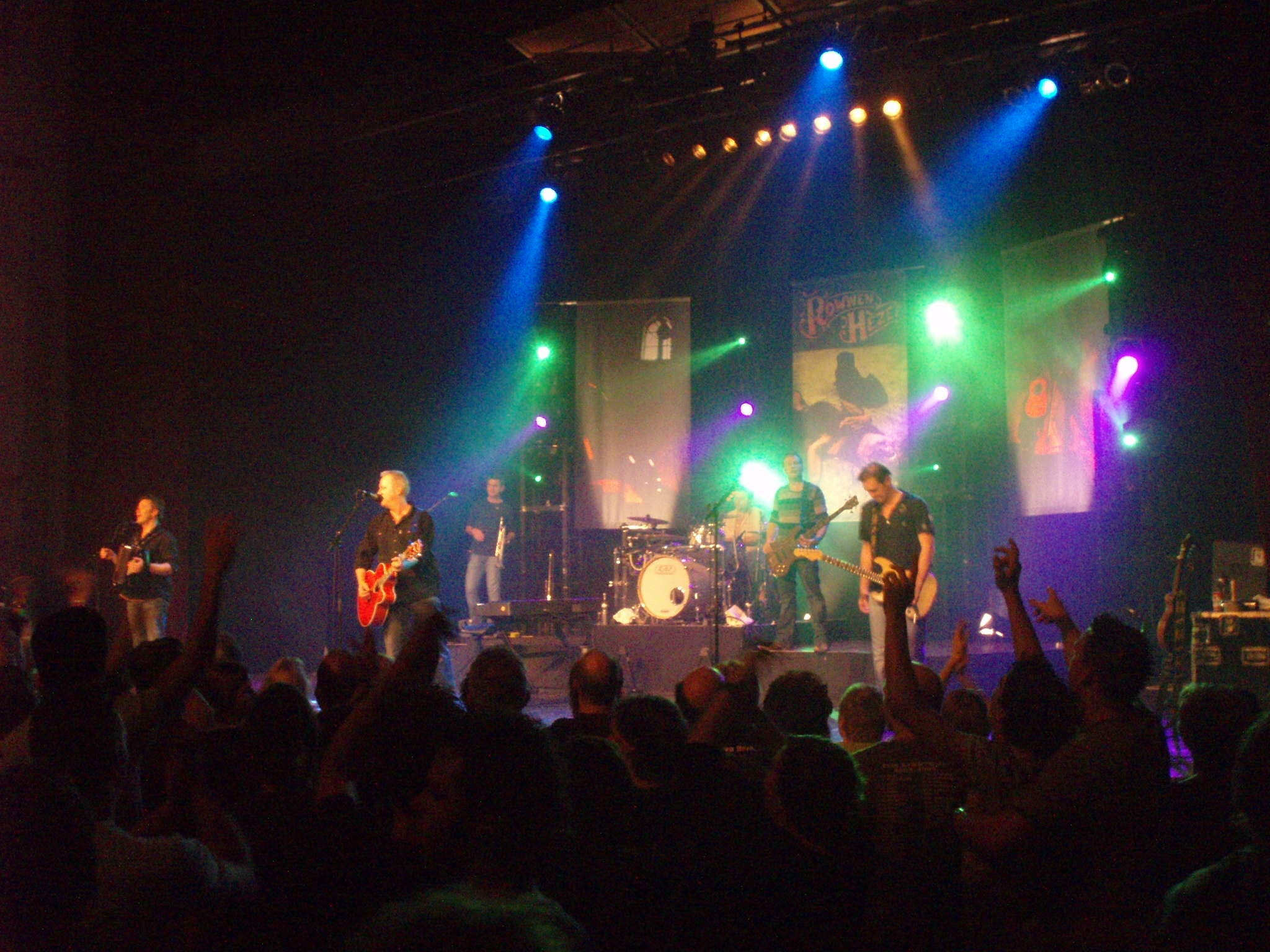
Rowwen Hèze, 1998 winner.

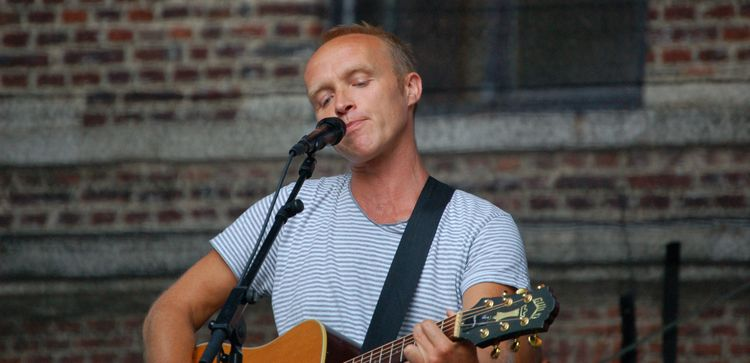
Stef Bos, two-time winner (1999 and 2000)

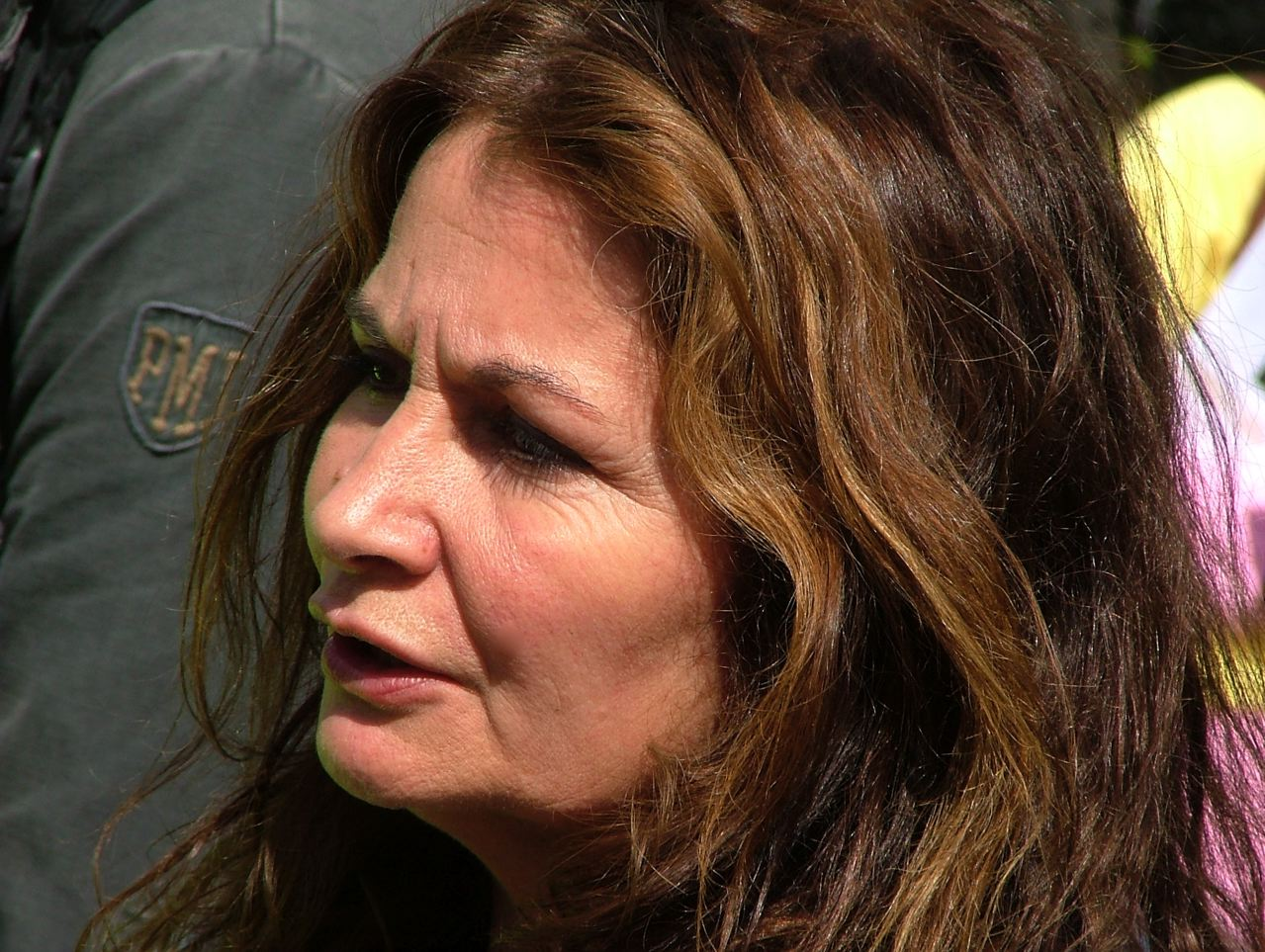
Belinda Meuldijk, 2001 winner

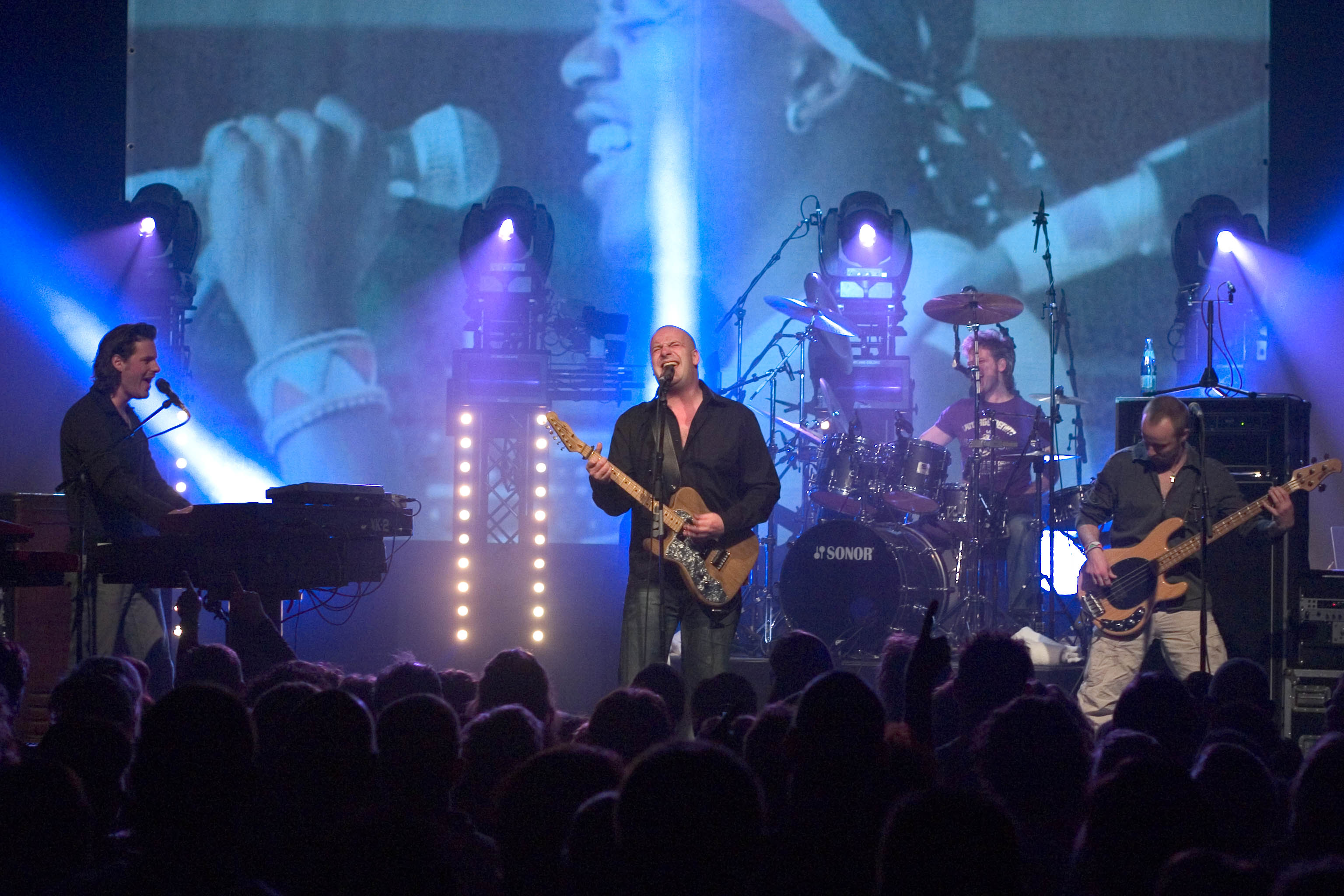
Bløf, 2002 winner

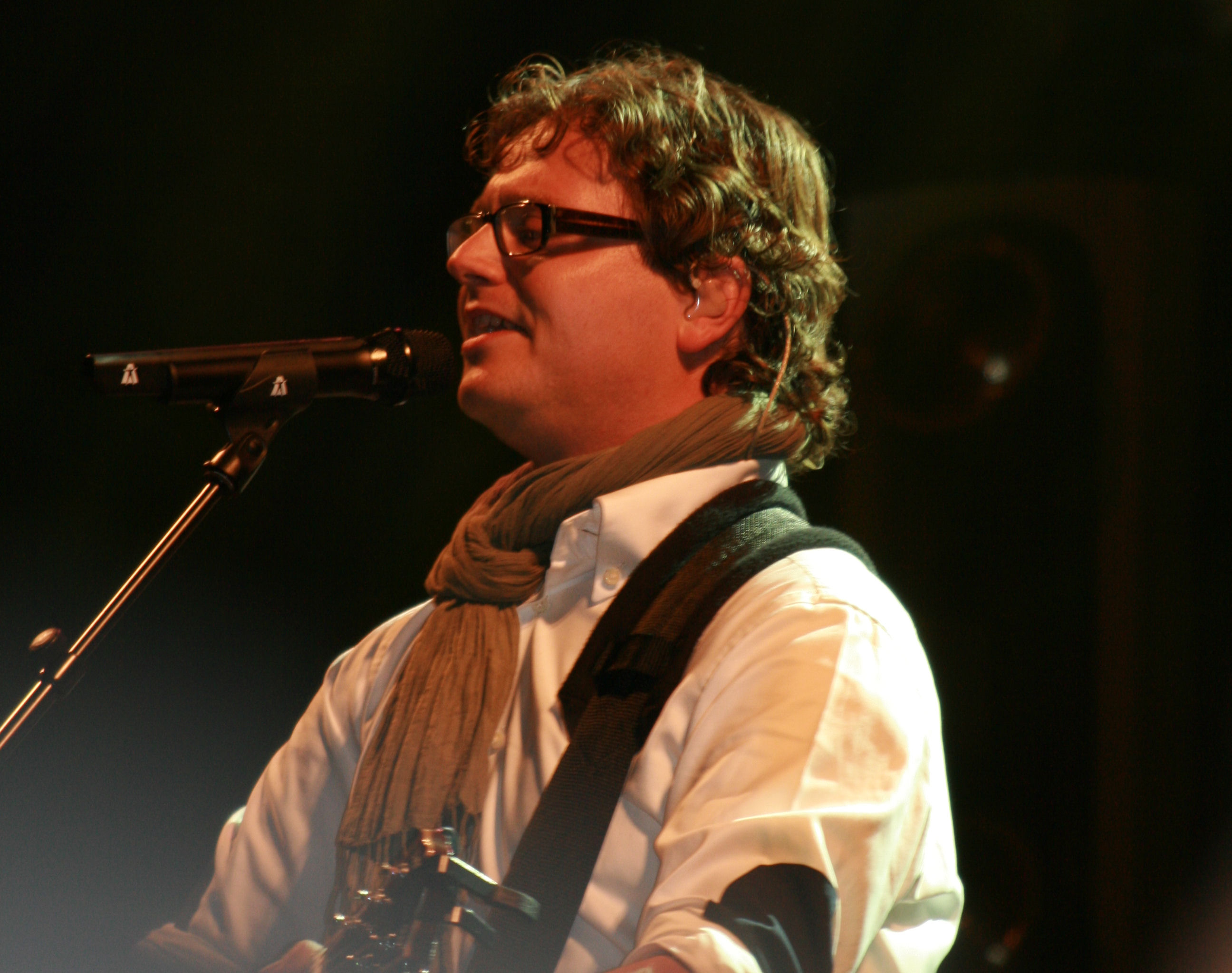
Guus Meeuwis, 2005 winner

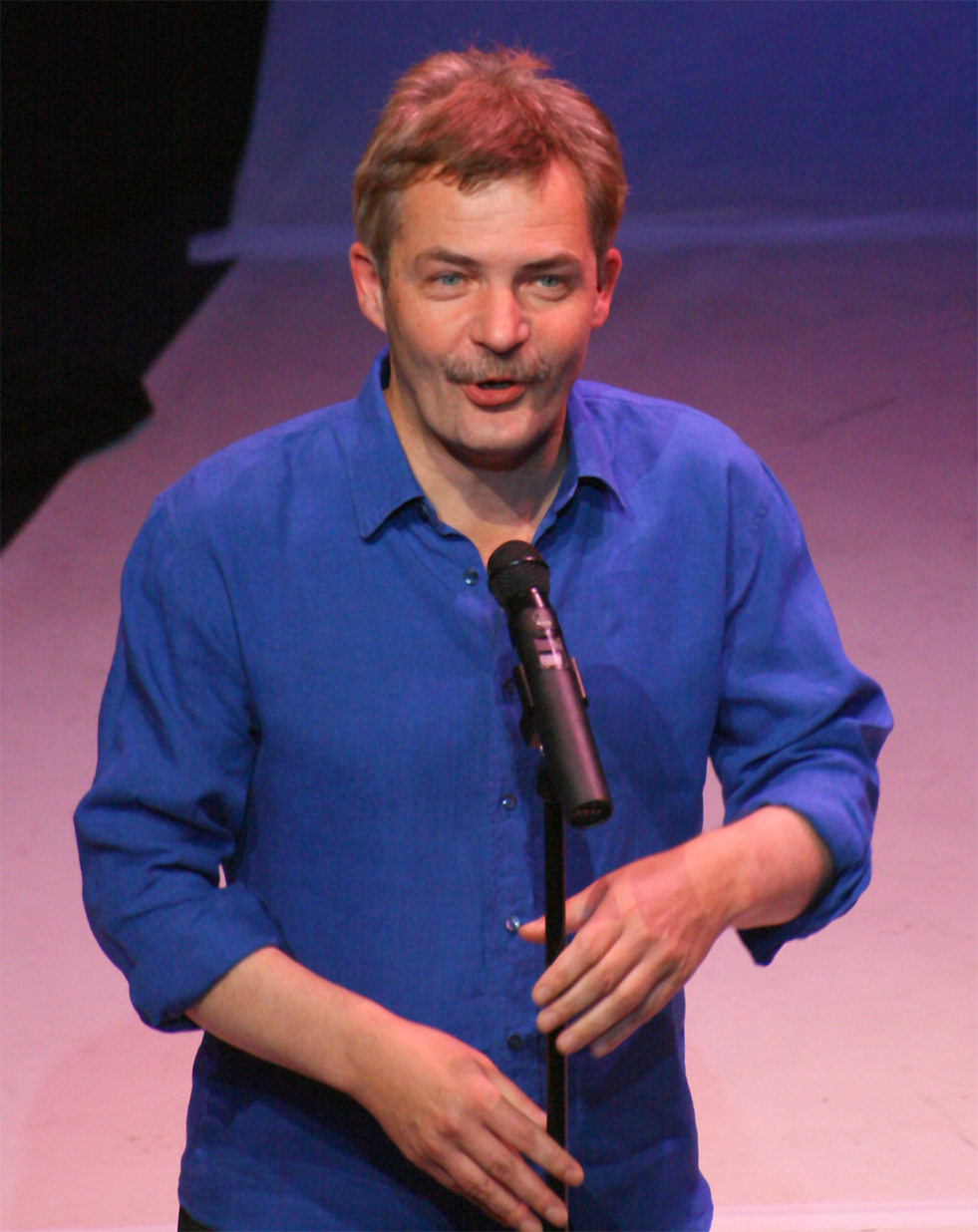
Herman Finkers, 2006 winner

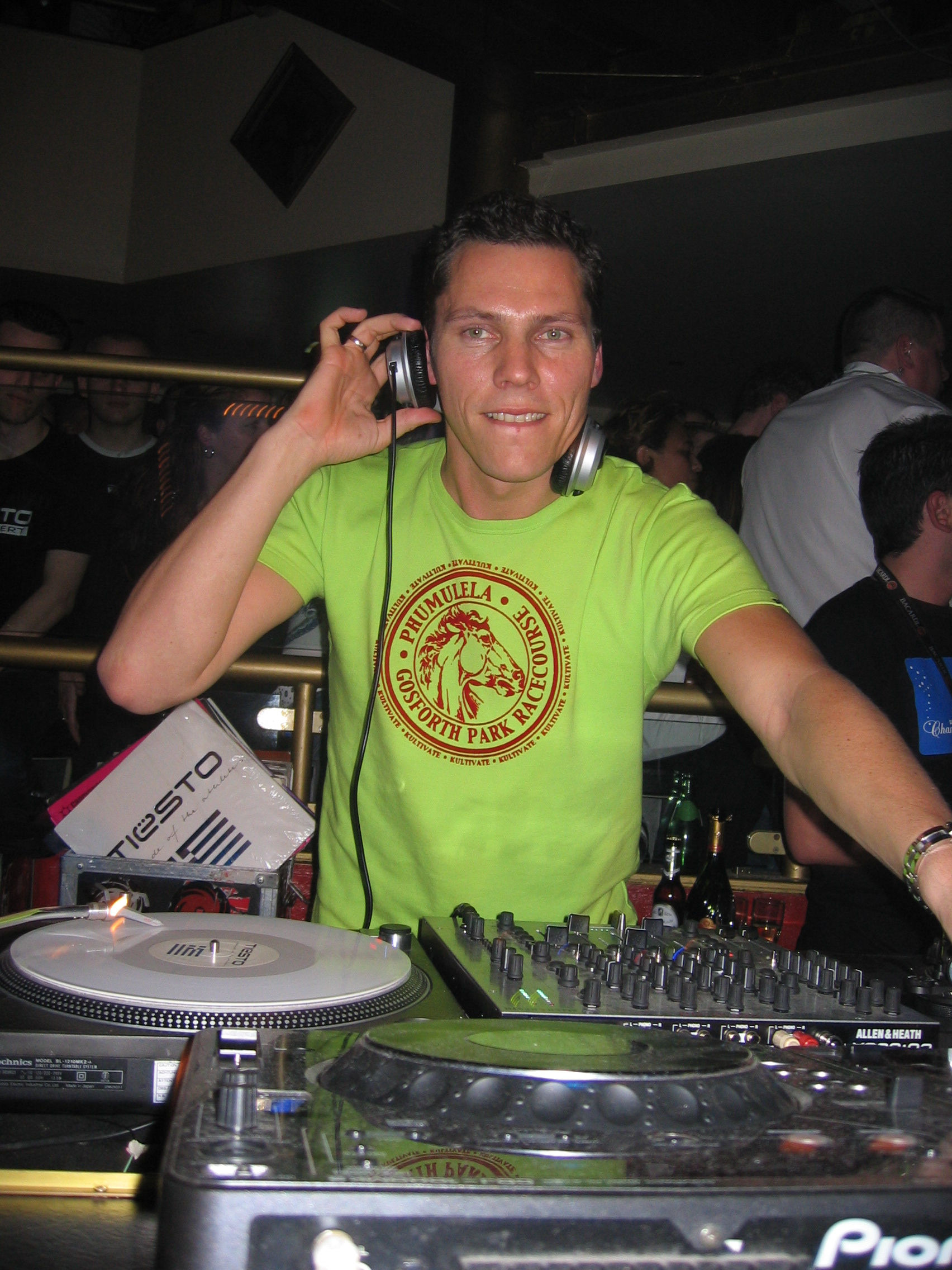
DJ Tiësto, 2007 winner

Winners of the Golden Harp
Year	Winner	Dates	Profession	Notes
1962	Ferry van Delden	1892–1965	broker, journalist and songwriter	
1962	Hugo de Groot	1897–1986	composer and conductor	
1964	Rine Geveke	1915–2006	producer	
1964	Max van Praag	1913–1991	singer	
1964	Lex van Weren	1920–1996	trumpeter and conductor	
1964	Jack Bess	1908–1964	poet and songwriter	
1965	Eddy Christiani	1918–2016	composer, guitarist, singer and songwriter	
1965	Benedict Silberman	1901–1971	composer, musician and singer	
1966	Arie Maasland	1908–1980	composer and musician	
1966	Bob Scholte	1902–1983	singer	
1967	Annie M.G. Schmidt	1911–1995	writer (books, drama, musicals, plays, poems, songs)	
1967	Harry Bannink	1929–1999	arranger, composer and pianist	
1967	Joop de Leur	1900–1973	composer and jazz pioneer	
1968	Corry Brokken	1932–2016	judge, presenter and singer	
1968	Wim Ibo	1918–2000	comedian, historian, producer and writer	^{[ii]}
1968	Michel van der Plas	1927–2013	journalist, poet and writer	
1968	Herman Tholen	1921–1993	comedian	
1969	Conny Stuart	1913–2010	comedian, Musical star and singer	
1969	Jules de Corte	1924–1996	composer, pianist, poet and singer	
1969	Harry de Groot	1920–2004	accordionist, arranger, composer, conductor and pianist	
1969	Jack Millar	1928–1999	discographer	
1969	Cor Smit	1916–	producer	
1970	Jack Bulterman	1909–1977	arranger, composer, conductor and songwriter	
1970	Pieter Goemans	1925–2000	composer	
1970	Robbie van Leeuwen	1944–	composer, guitarist, producer and singer	
1970	Lennaert Nijgh	1945–2002	songwriter	
1970	Jelle de Vries	1922–1999	comedian, singer and songwriter	
1970	A.J.G. Strengholt	-	music expert, jury member of Conamus	
1971	Jasperina de Jong	1938–	actress, comedian and singer	
1971	Guus Vleugel	1932–1998	dramatist and songwriter	
1971	Eli Asser	1922–	songwriter	
1971	Bert Paige	-	arranger, composer, musician and producer	
1971	Julius Susan	-	-	-
1972	Nico Boer	1932–2009	singer (tenor)	-
1972	Johnny Jordaan	1924–1989	singer	
1972	Cor Lemaire	1908–1981	composer, conductor and pianist	^{[ii]}
1972	Marinus van ‘t Woud	-	-	-
1972	Willy van Hemert	1912–1993	actor, comedian, director and songwriter	
1973	Willy Alberti	1926–1985	singer	
1973	The Cats	1965–1994	pop group	
1973	Henk Elsink	-	comedian	
1973	Boudewijn de Groot	1944–	actor and troubadour	
1974	Hans van Hemert	1945–	producer and songwriter	
1974	Joop Stokkermans	1937–2012	composer, pianist and producer	
1974	Paul van Vliet	1935–	singer	
1974	Rolf ten Kate	-	-	-
1975	Han Dunk	-	-	-
1975	Gerrit den Braber	1929–1997	composer, producer and songwriter	
1975	Rogier van Otterloo	1941–1988	composer and conductor	
1975	Zangeres zonder Naam	1919–1998	singer	
1976	Adèle Bloemendaal	1933–	actress, comedian and singer	
1976	George Baker Selection	1967–	pop group	
1976	Herman van Veen	1945–	actor, composer, director, painter and songwriter	
1977	Conny Vandenbos	1937–2002	singer	
1977	André van Duin	1947–	comedian, singer and songwriter	
1977	Peter Koelewijn	1940–	deejay, producer and singer	
1978	Harrie Geelen	1939–	animator, illustrator, film director, translator, poet and writer	
1978	Pierre Kartner	1935–	composer, producer and singer	
1978	Henry Mildenberg	1913–2005	writer, Conamus staff member	
1979	Willem Duys; Toon Hermans; The Ramblers; Gerard van Krevelen			
1980	Earth & Fire; Ramses Shaffy			
1981	Willeke Alberti; Tonny Eyk; Willem van Kooten			
1982	Ruud Bos; BZN; Rob de Nijs			
1983	Florie Anstadt (Kinderen voor Kinderen); Golden Earring; Johnny Hoes; Laurens van Rooyen			
1984	Jaap Eggermont; Robert Long			
1985	Martine Bijl; Ivo de Wijs; Gerard Stellaard			
1986	Bolland & Bolland; Seth Gaaikema; Herman Stok; Pi Vèriss			
1987	Jos Brink; Mieke Telkamp; Hans Vermeulen; Willem Wilmink			
1988	Annie de Reuver; Flairck; Herman Brood			
1989	Gerard Cox; The Nits; Henk Temming & Henk Westbroek; Harry van Hoof			
1990	Corry Konings; Erik van der Wurff; Jan Boerstoel; Frank Boeijen			
1991	Drs. P (Heinz Polzer); Margriet Eshuys			
1992	Jenny Arean; Anita Meyer; Normaal; Hans van Eijck			
1993	Peter van Asten; De Dijk; Joop van den Ende			
1994	Jurre Haanstra; André Hazes; Karin Bloemen; René Froger			
1995	Paul de Leeuw; Benny Neyman; Metropole Orkest; Henny Vrienten			
1996	Youp van 't Hek; Ruth Jacott; John de Mol sr. The Scene			
1997	Jochem Fluitsma & Eric van Tijn; Freek de Jonge; Liesbeth List; Mathilde Santing			
1998	Roy Beltman; Marco Borsato; John Ewbank; Willem Nijholt; Rowwen Hèze			
1999	Eddy de Clercq; Fay Lovsky; Stef Bos; Rini Schreijenberg & Emile Hartkamp			
2000	Stef Bos	1961–		
2001	De Kast; Belinda Meuldijk			
2002	Anouk; Acda & De Munnik; Bløf			
2002	Simone Kleinsma	1958–	singer, musical actress, presenter and comedian	-
2002	2003	Frans Bauer; Hans Dorrestijn; Trijntje Oosterhuis		
2004	Jan Akkerman; Lenette van Dongen; Friso Wiegersma			
2005	Brigitte Kaandorp	1962–	comedian	
2005	Guus Meeuwis	1972–	singer, composer	
2005	Ferry Maat	1947–	dee jay, producer	
2006	Louis van Dijk	1941–2020	pianist	
2006	Herman Finkers	1954–	comedian	
2006	Harry Muskee	1941–2011	Blues singer	
2006	Willem van Beusekom	1947–2006	music expert	^{[iii]}
2007	Ilse de Lange	1977–	singer	
2007	Tiësto	1969–	dee jay	
2007	Candy Dulfer	1969–	alto saxophonist	
2008	Krezip			
2008	Gerard van Maasakkers			
2008	Jan Smit	1985–		
2008	Within Temptation			
2009	Armin van Buuren	1976–		
2009	Jaap Buys			
2009	Wende Snijders	1978–		
2010	Nick & Simon			
2010	Tony Berk			
2010	VanVelzen	1978–		
2010	Kane			

== Notes ==
- ^{i} The phrase "Considered for this award are persons who have made themselves particularly meritorious for Dutch light music throughout their careers." is a translation of the Dutch phrase "Voor de Gouden Harp komen personen in aanmerking die zich gedurende hun carrière op bijzondere wijze verdienstelijk hebben gemaakt voor de Nederlandse lichte muziek."
- ^{ii} Cor Lemaire and Wim Ibo returned their awards in response to the eleventh edition in 1975 after a Gouden Harp had been awarded to Mary Servaes-Bey (better known by her stage name Zangeres Zonder Naam).
- ^{iii} Received award posthumously.

== See also ==
- Zilveren Harp
- List of music awards
