= Flory Anstadt =

Dutch television program creator (1928–2024)

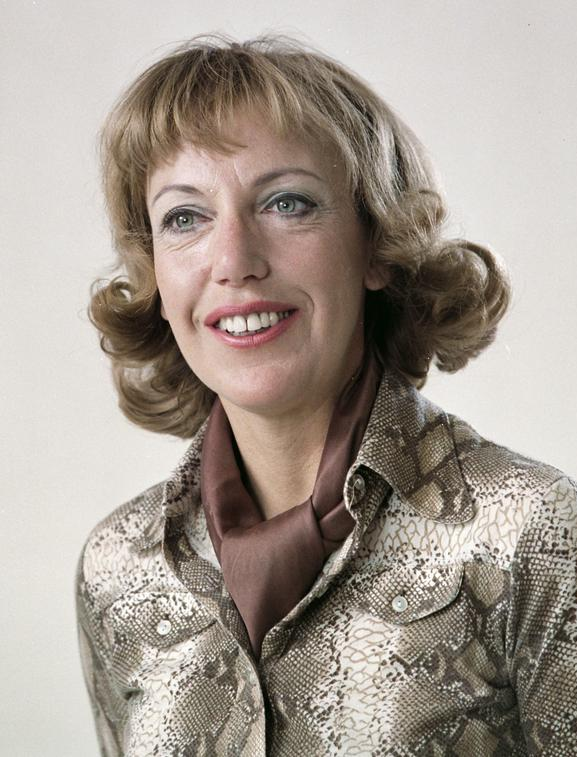
- Anstadt in 1971
- Born: 7 December 1928; Amsterdam, Netherlands
- Died: 21 October 2024 (aged 95)
- Occupations: Television program creator, television director

Florentine "Flory" Anstadt-ten Camp (7 December 1928 – 21 October 2024) was a Dutch television program creator and director.

== Career ==
Anstadt worked for more than thirty years at the Omroepvereniging VARA. She was most known as the founder of Kinderen voor Kinderen in 1980. She won an Edison in 1981 and the Golden Harp in 1982. She also made other television programs, including Roffel together with Leoni Jansen, 't Spant erom together with Piet Römer and Willem Nijholt and Vooruit met de geit that was filmed in Dierenpark Emmen.

Anstadt died on 21 October 2024, at the age of 95.
