= Pipo en de p-p-Parelridder =

2003 film

Pipo en de P-P-Parelridder
- Theatrical release poster
- Directed by: Martin Lagestee
- Screenplay by: Wim Meuldijk; Peter Römer
- Based on: Pipo de Clown by Wim Meuldijk
- Produced by: Willem Zijlstra
- Starring: Joep Dorren; John Wijdenbosch; Mariska Van Kolck; Rudi Falkenhagen
- Cinematography: Maarten van Keller
- Edited by: Liesbeth Wieggers
- Music by: Jurre Haanstra
- Production companies: Endemol; TROS
- Distributed by: Independent Films (Theatrical); Universal Pictures; (Home media)
- Release date: 20 November 2003
- Running time: 95 minutes
- Country: Netherlands
- Language: Dutch
- Box office: $1.3 million

Pipo en de P-P-Parelridder (English translation: Pipo and the P-P-Pearl Knight) is a 2003 Dutch family film directed by Martin Lagestee, featuring characters from the Dutch children's television show Pipo de Clown.

The film was released on 20 November 2003 with Independent Films handling theatrical distribution and Universal Pictures home media distribution. It received a Golden Film for having drawn 100,000 visitors.

== Plot ==
Pipo receives a letter from Aunt Anouschka asking him for help with mysterious events in a nearby castle that appears to be haunted. Pipo leaves the circus in the hands of his wife Mamaloe and daughter Petra, to the chagrin of circus director Dikke Deur —a circus without Pipo sells fewer tickets. When Pipo arrives at the castle there is no ghost; instead, he finds a knight who has been asleep for 500 years. He is awakened, but the next problem is finding and waking his lady lover, who has also been asleep that long.

== Cast ==
- Joep Dorren as Pipo the Clown
- Mariska Van Kolck as Mammaloe
- Meta Speksnijder as Petra
- Daan Schuurmans as Knight Didero van Donderstein
- Karin Bloemen as Aunt Anouschka
- Hero Muller as Dikke Deur
- Rudi Falkenhagen as Snuf
- Felix-Jan Kuypers as Snuitje
- Harry van Rijthoeven as Miriardo
- John Wijdenbosch as Mik
- Tara Elders as Jonkvrouw de Bonban

== Production ==
From the late 1950s on, Pipo de Clown was one of the earliest and most popular children's television shows in the Netherlands. The show finally ended in 1980. In the late 1990s, the return of Pipo was touched upon when television talk show host Ivo Niehe interviewed Belinda Meuldijk, the daughter of Pipo's creator (Wim Meuldijk), and her husband, singer Rob de Nijs. Niehe tried to sell the idea to various broadcasters but without success, and the rights were bought by Endemol. Auditions were held, and Joep Dorren was chosen as the new Pipo. The script for a pilot and for six episodes was written, and the 40-minute-long pilot (filmed in 1999 on Rob de Nijs's estate) proved very popular, selling 100,000 copies on video; still, the public broadcasting corporations had no faith in Pipo's chance of success and thought it would be too expensive. In the end Endemol decided to make the series into a feature film instead.

The script is loosely based on a 1960 TV series, Pipo en het zingende zwaard, filming took place in Spain. The role of Snuf, one of the two crooks, was played by Rudi Falkenhagen, age 72. Falkenhagen was the last survivor of the original television show and Snuf was his first big role. He died two years later. Tara Elders, who starred in a number of Theo van Gogh movies, plays the part of the titular character's lady lover.

== Reception ==
=== Box office ===
The movie cost about €3.5 million to make. It brought in €692,665 in 2003 and €815,120 in 2004.

== Canceled Sequel ==
In 2007, rumors circulated that a second Pipo film was to be made, Pipo & Het Geheim Van De Barkini Driehoek, written by Meuldijk and directed by Lagestee, with Joep Dorre returning as Pipo. The Indian Klukkluk, notably absent from Pipo en de p-p-Parelridder, was to make his return. According to Meuldijk, the film was set to be released at the end of 2008. However, Meuldijk died in 2007, and though a musical, Pipo en de Gestolen Stem, was produced in 2009, no movie has been released.
