= Pipo de Clown =

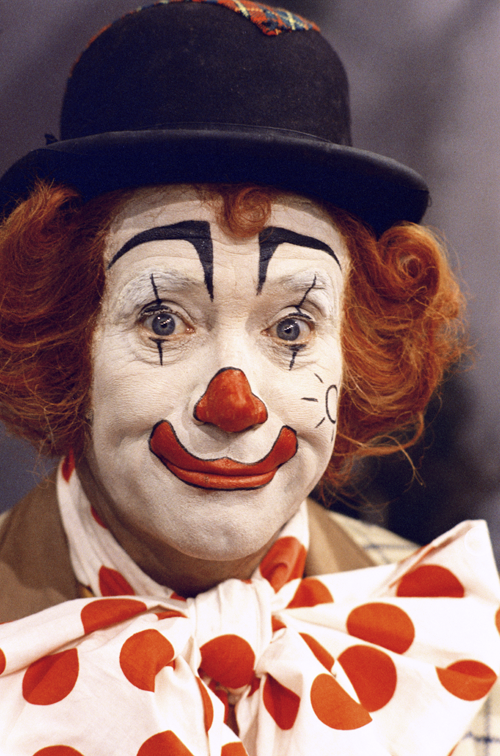
- Pipo de Clown, 1973
- Created by: Wim Meuldijk
- Country of origin: Netherlands
- Original language: Dutch

Original release
- Release: 17 September 1958 – 19 April 1980

Pipo de Clown is a character created by writer and artist Wim Meuldijk, which became famous as the lead character of a popular early Dutch television series also written by Meuldijk, and which was subsequently popularized in movies and on records. The best-known of Pipo-actors was Amsterdam actor Cor Witschge, who played the part in the television series from 1958 to 1968 and from 1974 to 1980. The regular Pipo cast often performed in theaters and for company occasions. Pipo returned to the mainstream in the 2003 movie Pipo en de p-p-Parelridder, and in the 2009-2010 theater season with the musical Pipo en de Gestolen Stem.

== History ==
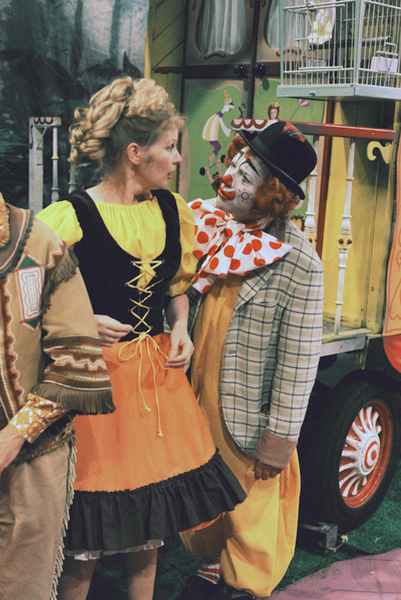
Pipo de Clown (Cor Witschge) with his wife Mamaloe (Marijke Bakker)

The first Pipo episode was televised on 17 September 1958; until 1964 Pipo's adventures were spread out over multiple episodes.

The face of Pipo de Clown is designed by Ton van den Heuvel.

Pipo and his wife Mamaloe, with daughter Petra, live in a travel trailer and travel the country, performing as a circus act and running into adventures. In the first series, the family lives in an attic and travels on foot; in the second series, Pipo en de Bibberhaai, Pipo is given his familiar trailer by the gipsy Felicio. In the fifth series, Pipo en de Waterlanders, the two crooks Snuf and Snuitje (the "pearl thieves"), played by Rudi Falkenhagen and Will Spoor, make their first appearance. Another actor appearing for the first time in that series was Donald Jones, who played Mik in the television series Mik & Mak (also written by Meuldijk).

Between 1966 and 1968 the NTS showed five-minute episodes in the series Dag vogels, dag bloemen, dag kinderen. Christel Adelaar, pregnant at the time, was replaced by Marijke Bakker. In two years, more than 600 episodes were filmed, after which the Arbeidsinspectie, the Dutch agency that regulates child labor, put a stop to Pipo and Mamaloe's daughter, Petra, appearing in the show. Pipo also appeared in print: from 1969 to 1973 Donald Duck Magazine ran a comics version, drawn by Jan van der Voo.

After 1971 the VARA broadcasting association picked up the show for a number of long adventures, but Cor Witschge had been replaced by Cees van Oyen, and Marijke Bakker by Janine van Wely after a business conflict pertaining to copyright issues. The replacement actors turned out not to be popular at all, and the original actors returned the following season, though van Wely also returned, but as Pipo's sister, "Plom."

The last televised show was on 19 April 1980, after the VARA had judged that the show was too expensive. Cor Witschge played Pipo for the last time on 17 February 1990, on the television show Rondom tien, after which he donated the Pipo costume to the Netherlands Institute for Sound and Vision.

== List of television shows ==
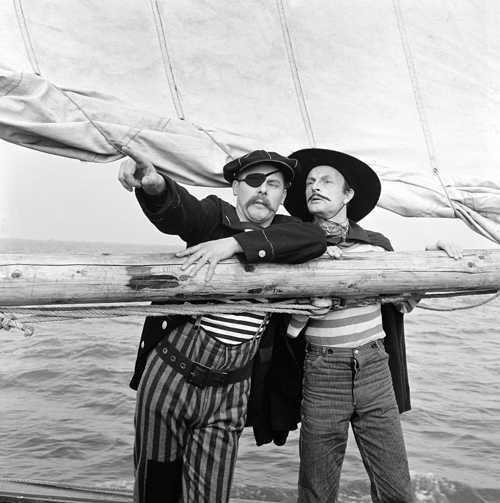
Snuf and Snuitje

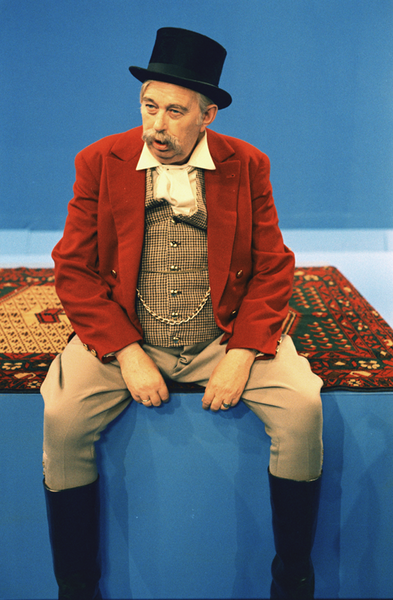
Dikke Deur (Willy Ruys)

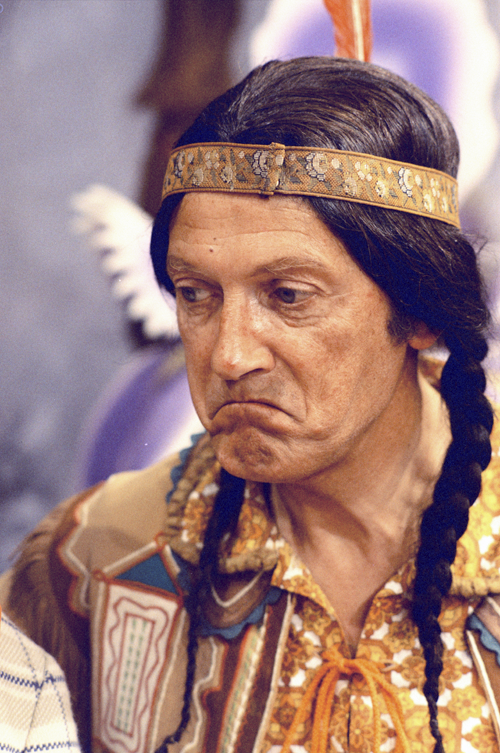
Klukkluk

- Pipo de Clown (12 episodes, 17 September 1958 - 13 May 1959)
- Pipo en de Bibberhaai (16 episodes, 17 October 1959 - 8 June 1960)
- Pipo en het zingende zwaard (17 episodes, 17 September 1960 - 7 juni 1961)
- Pipo in Kaliefland (12 episodes, 16 September 1961 - 14 February 1962)
- Pipo en de Waterlanders (15 episodes, 30 October 1963 - 10 June 1964)
- Pipo en de druppels (1 episode, 20 June 1964)
- Dag vogels, dag bloemen, dag kinderen (1 October 1966 - 26 May 1968)
- Pipo op Bizarra (14 episodes, 29 March - 23 June 1971)
- Pipo op Marobia (12 episodes, 1 January - 19 March 1974)
- Pipo en het grachtengeheim (4 episodes, 4–25 September 1975)
- Pipo en de Lachplaneet (4 afleveringen, 1 januari - 22 januari 1976)
- Pipo en de piraten van Toen (5 episodes, 2–30 September 1976)
- Pipo en de Noorderzon (7 episodes, 14 April - 26 May 1978)
- Pipo in West Best (7 episodes, 1 March - 19 April 1980)

=== Main characters ===
- Pipo de Clown, Cor Witschge (1958–1968), Cees van Oyen (1971), Cor Witschge (1974–1980)
- Mamaloe, Christel Adelaar (1958–1965), Marijke Bakker (1966–1968), Janine van Wely (1971), Marijke Bakker (1974–1980)
- Petra, Petra Barnard (1958–1960), Marjolein Knap (1966–1968)
- Klukkluk, Herbert Joeks (1958–1959, 1966–1968, 1971, 1974, 1976, 1980)

Klukkluk was "the Indian", a stereotypical native American character speaking broken Dutch who was good friends with Pipo and performed in the same circus

- Dikke Deur, Lou Geels (1958–1959), Willy Ruys (1966–1968, 1975)

The proverbial bad boss whose one real interest is eating pie; Pipo used to work for his circus, and Dikke Deur is trying to get back at Pipo by doublecrossing him

- Snuf, Rudi Falkenhagen (1963–1964, 1971)
- Snuitje, Will Spoor (1963–1964)
- Mik, Donald Jones (1963–1964)
- Plom, Janine van Wely (1974, 1976–1980)

Pipo's sister, played by the actress who had briefly replaced Marijke Bakker as Pipo's wife

== The return of Pipo ==
The return of Pipo was touched upon when television talk show host Ivo Niehe interviewed Belinda Meuldijk, Wim Meuldijk's daughter, and her husband, singer Rob de Nijs. Niehe tried to sell the idea to various broadcasters but without success, and the rights were bought by Endemol. Auditions were held, and Joep Dorren was chosen as the new Pipo. The script for a pilot and for six episodes was written, and the 40-minute-long pilot (filmed in 1999 on Rob de Nijs's estate) proved very popular. The public broadcasting corporations, however, had no faith in Pipo's chance of success, and in the end Endemol decided to make the series into a feature movie, Pipo en de p-p-parelridder, directed by Martin Lagestee and with a script by Wim Meuldijk. The movie was filmed in Spain for around 3.5 million Euro and premiered in November 2003. The role of Snuf was played by Rudi Falkenhagen, age 72, and the last survivor of the original television show; he died two years later.

For the 2009-2010 season, Raymond Aerts en Gerard Cornelissen (prompted and supervised by Belinda Meuldijk) staged a musical, Pipo en de Gestolen Stem, in which Pipo travels to the empire of Zozonia to retrieve the stolen voice of Mamaloe. Belinda Meuldijk wrote the lyrics for the songs.

== In other media ==
The series was adapted into a comic strip, written by Wim Meuldijk and drawn by Jan van der Voo. It ran from 1969 to 1973.
