= Wim Meuldijk =

Dutch writer, illustrator, and screenwriter (1922–2007)

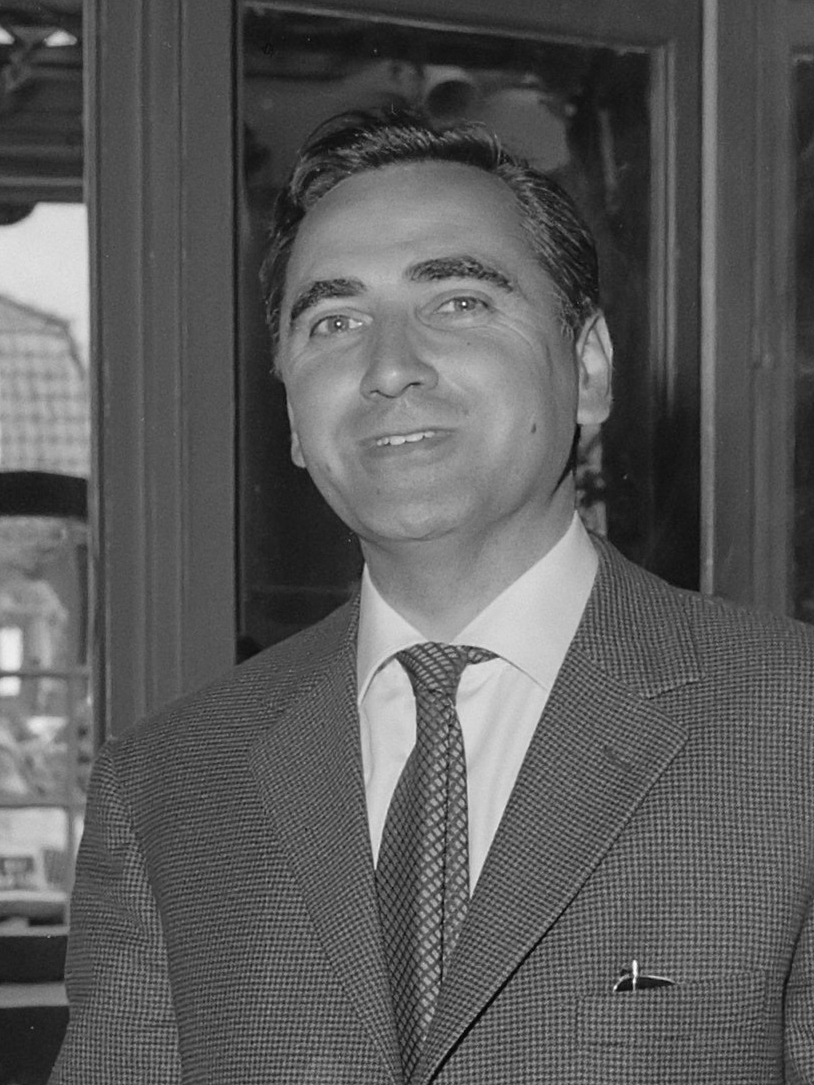
- Wim Meuldijk (1962)
- Born: 8 June 1922; Schiedam, Netherlands
- Died: 27 December 2007 (aged 85); Vera, Spain
- Occupations: comics artist, screenwriter
- Known for: Pipo de Clown, Ketelbinkie

Wim Meuldijk (8 June 1922 – 27 December 2007) was a Dutch writer, illustrator, and screenwriter. He is the creator of Ketelbinkie, one of the most popular Dutch comics after World War II, and of Pipo de Clown, the star of a television show that ran from 1958 to 1980 which Meuldijk produced, filmed, and for which he wrote the script.

== Biography ==
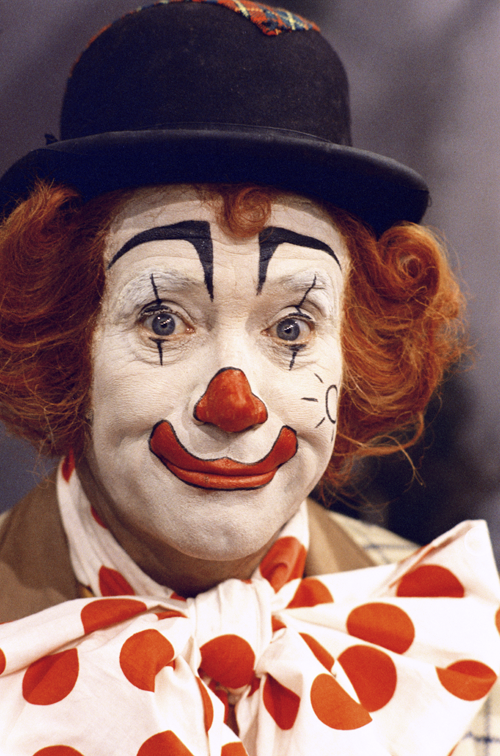
Pipo de Clown, 1973

Meuldijk's career as an illustrator really started during World War II. While in hiding to avoid being drafted, he developed a comic (Snowflake and the Eskimo), and after the war started publishing a comic magazine, Snowflake, which turned into Ketelbinkie Krant, a magazine containing what was to be his breakthrough: Ketelbinkie, a three-panel comic about a little street kid with miraculous strength. The comic first appeared in 1945 and ran in the daily newspapers for twelve years. After that, Meuldijk wrote for radio shows until he was asked by the VARA, one of the Dutch broadcasting organizations, to help make a television show. He drew the clown and thus created the character Pipo de Clown.

For more than twenty years, Meuldijk wrote the Pipo shows. During the show's first years he actually lived and traveled in a travel trailer, just like his character, and both his wife and his daughter were recognized in Pipo's wife and daughter, Mamaloe and Petra. His daughter, Belinda, first performed on the show at age six. In the early days of Pipo de Clown, which was initially broadcast live on Wednesday afternoon, Meuldijk did everything himself, from writing the script and casting the supporting actors to designing the set and choosing locations; he even built and painted Pipo's travel trailer.

Meuldijk also wrote screenplays for other television shows, including Mik & Mak and Koning Bolo, and scenes for the Dutch Sesame Street, but remained pigeonholed the rest of his life as the creator of Pipo. His last creative act was the script for the 2003 film Pipo en de p-p-Parelridder. At the time of filming he was 81 and could not direct the movie, but did spend a number of days on the set in Córdoba, Spain.

He is praised for his imaginative use of language and is credited with coining a number of expressions that via Pipo and other characters from the show made their way into daily usage.
