= Dossier Verhulst =

Dossier Verhulst was a Dutch drama from 1986. The first episode was broadcast on 7 November 1986 on TROS. The series has been released on DVD.

== Episodes ==
1. De Beëdiging
2. Het incident
3. De Echtscheiding
4. De kostschool
5. De verzoening
6. De verleiding begint
7. Het moment van de waarheid
8. De koude Douche
9. De confrontatie
10. De aanslag
11. De vergelding
12. Een nieuwe zet

== Cast ==
=== Main characters ===
- Derek de Lint – Eric Hoogland
- Petra Laseur – Nicolle Lebbink
- Liz Snoijink – Lucy Verhulst – van Delden
- Dolf de Vries – Oscar Verhulst
- Hidde Schols – Gieltje Verhulst
- Manon Alving – Betsie Groen
- Rudi Falkenhagen – Henri Bolleman
- Jules Hamel – Roel Smits
- Pim Vosmaer – Peter de Koning
- Hans Veerman – Bert de Vos
