= Christel Adelaar =

Dutch actress and singer

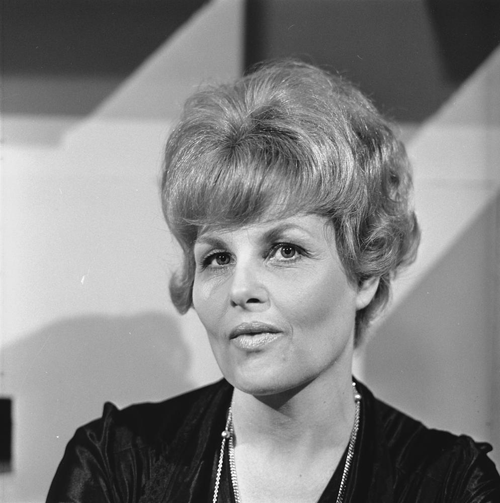
- Born: 14 February 1935; Semarang, Dutch East Indies
- Died: 10 January 2013 (aged 77); Heemstede
- Occupation: Actress
- Known for: Pipo de Clown

Christine Cornelie Thoma (Christel) Adelaar (14 February 1935 – 10 January 2013) was a Dutch actress. She was most notable for playing Mammaloe in the Dutch TV series Pipo de Clown.

== Life ==
Adelaar was born in Semarang, Dutch East Indies (now Indonesia). In 1987, she was diagnosed with breast cancer, but overcame the disease. Then in 2011, she was diagnosed with lung cancer. She died in Heemstede at the age of 77 as a consequence of this disease.
