= Benedict Silberman =

Dutch composer and conductor (1901-1971)

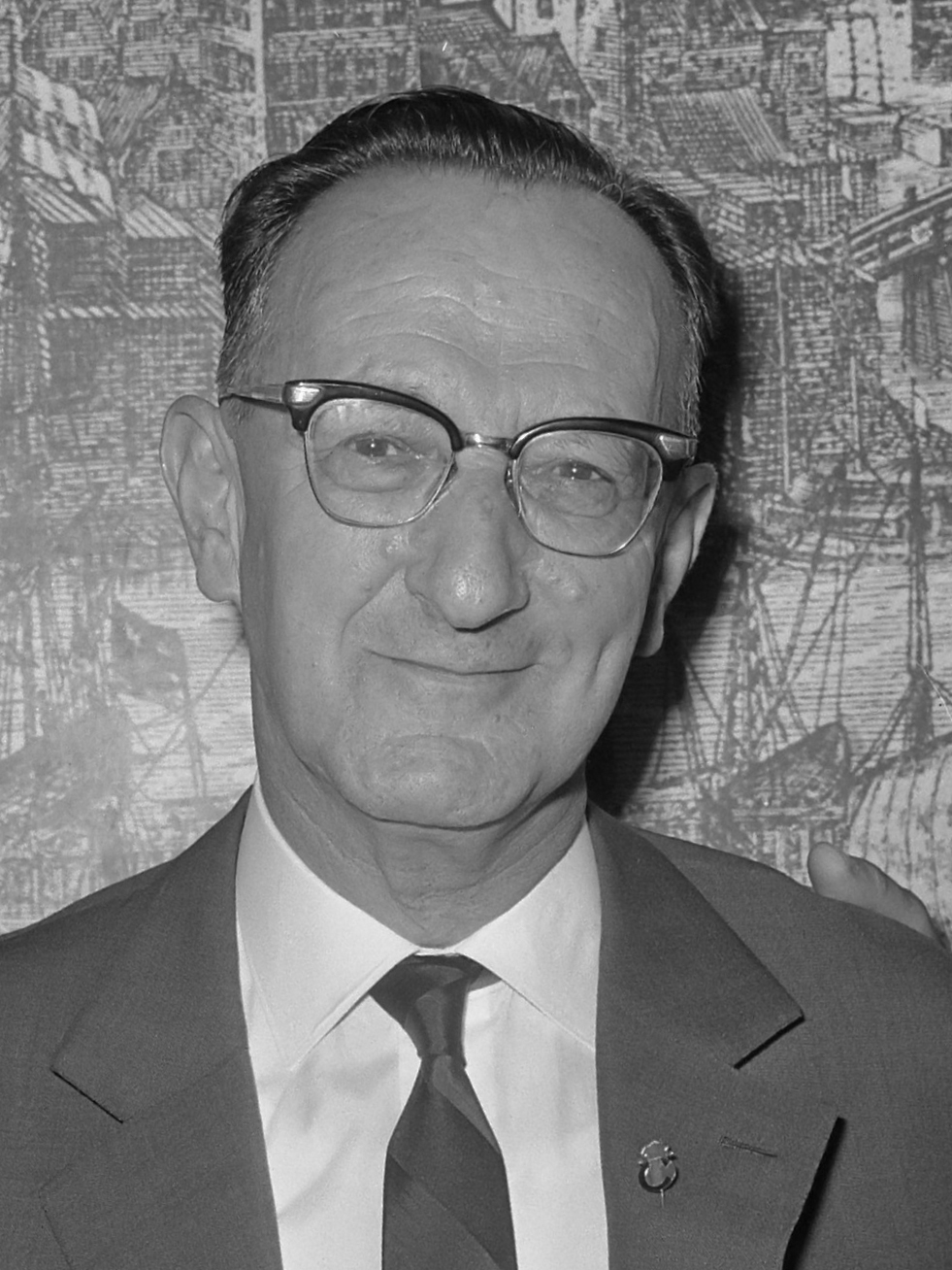
Benedict Silberman (1965)

Benedict Silberman, originally Boruch Hirsch-Benedigton Silberman (December 5, 1901 in Helsinki, Finland – December 11, 1971 in Hilversum, Netherlands), was a Dutch composer and conductor of Austrian Jewish descent.

Silberman was the son of an Austrian violinist working in Helsinki who settled in Amsterdam. Silberman studied piano with Jean-Baptiste de Pauw and composition with Sem Dresden at the Amsterdam Conservatory. He wrote a piano concerto (1924) at the end of his studies. A year later he composed a violin concerto. He left for Berlin where he played as a violinist and arranged light classical music, preferentially Viennese operettas. In 1944 he composed his own operetta Het Rozeneiland (The Island of Roses). He had contact with Franz Lehár, Robert Stolz and Emmerich Kálmán and toured Europe with the dance orchestras of Paul Godwin, Marek Weber and Dajos Bela.

In 1936 he returned to the Netherlands and became pianist in the AVRO radio orchestra of Kovacs Lajos. In 1938 he became conductor of the VARA radio orchestra. In 1948 he was asked to create a radio orchestra specialized in light classical music; he led this Promenade Orkest from 1949 till 1967. In 1965, he won the Golden Harp for his contributions to Dutch music.

In 1965 Shlomo Carlebach published the album In the Palace of the King, Silberman arranged and conducted the chorus and symphony orchestra.

Benedict Silberman composed The Battle of Waterloo, chamber music which makes you relive the battle of Waterloo (Napoleon). Silberman was also the conductor of this music, the sound engineer was Ruud van Lieshout, the orchestra was the Promenade Orchestra, the producer was Gerrit den Braber and the recording supervisor was Joop Stokkermans.

The Battle of Waterloo is a fantasy by B. Silberman made after old motives.
