= Frizzle Sizzle =

Dutch girl group

Frizzle Sizzle were a Dutch teenage girl group of the 1980s. Their biggest hit was "Alles Heeft Een Ritme", which they performed at Eurovision in Norway in 1986.

The four members of the group were Karin Vlasblom (born 10 August 1967), Laura Vlasblom (born 8 October 1968), Mandy Huydts (born 9 April 1969) and Marjon Keller (born 1 June 1970).

== History ==
=== Early years: Kinderen voor Kinderen ===
The girls debuted in 1981 on the second album of Kinderen voor Kinderen, a children's choir whose ongoing television-shows are broadcast by VARA each November. All four of them were given a lead vocal; Karin in Gastarbeider (a song about a forbidden love between a Dutch girl and a Greek boy), Mandy in Bijna brugklas (about the transition from primary to secondary school) and Marjon in Roken, an anti-smoking tirade. Laura sang Verlegenheid (a reminder that shyness hits everyone at one moment) in an embryonic line-up of Frizzle Sizzle (minus Marjon). Due to their age (14 was the maximum), the Vlasblom sisters left after the second album; Mandy and Marjon paid further contributions to the third album. The former sang Ik ben verliefd (about being in love), the latter Op de wip (about being stuck in the middle between a pain-in-the-neck brother and a bossy sister). Marjon left after the fourth album on which she had minor roles in two tracks; Iedereen gaat voor z'n beurt (Nobody waits his turn) and 'Ziek zijn (which sums up the joys of pretending to be sick to miss a day of school). She also sang the first half of the call-for-exercise Trim trim trim.

=== Breaking out and breaking through ===
In 1984 the girls appeared on the fifth show to tell that they formed a girl group and sang about their days with the choir as a bridge between the interviews with the departures and the new batch of songs. Marjon contributed to the volumes 5 and 6 as a backing vocalist.

Naming themselves Frizzle Sizzle they were selected to represent the Netherlands in the Eurovision Song Contest 1986 with Alles heeft een ritme (Everything has rhythm), a continuation of the original Kinderen voor Kinderen-sound. At the end of the night, they ranked 13th out of 20, receiving 40 points. In the Dutch charts, the song went to No. 21.

Soon afterwards Frizzle Sizzle released songs in English (Never Give Up being the first). In early 1987 they had a No. 14 hit with Talk it Over, which was favourably compared to the established girl group Dolly Dots. Second Chance reached No. 38 the same year. Frizzle Sizzle were joint winners of the 1987 Silver Harp Awards for new bands with their first and only album First Date.

In 1988 Frizzle Sizzle appeared on the educational TV-show Mijn Eerste Keer (My First Time) singing about their first bicycle-ride (backed by an on-location video).

=== Solo activities ===
In 1990 they broke up but not before lending their voices to the Herman van Veen-created cartoon series Alfred J Kwak and releasing the World Cup-themed Alles Is Oranje (Everything Is Orange). The girls remained active in showbusiness.

- Karin made television programmes.

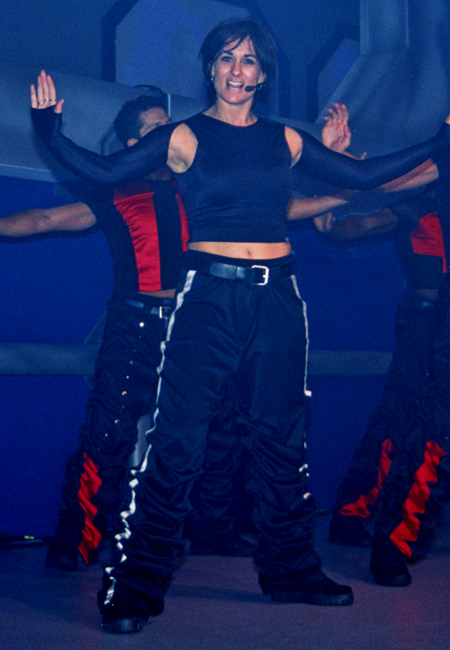
Laura Vlasblom performing in 1999.

- Laura pursued a solo career and lived with boyband singer-turned-musical actor Bastiaan Ragas. (She also does Dutch voice-overs & songs for many characters in animated movies. For example, she voiced Gloria in Madagascar, Prinses Jasmine in Aladdin, Thumbelina in Thumbelina (1994), Robyn Starling in Tom and Jerry: The Movie & Ariel in The Little Mermaid). In 1992 Laura participated in the Dutch heat of the Eurovision Song Contest with the song Gouden Bergen (Gold Mountains); she had to settle for silver as it reached the second spot. In 1999 Laura appeared on RTL's live-music programme De Vrienden van Amstel; she performed three songs (two covers, one original) backed by Dutch-Moluccan percussion-rockers Massada.
- Mandy Huydts became a backing vocalist for megastar Rene Froger although she continued to perform her own songs.
- Marjon Keller, now hosting radio-shows as well as doing voice-overs for RTL, always insisted on not being lived by stardom. Back in 1988 she was quoted "It (was) fun being part of Frizzle Sizzle, but there are more things in life".

In 1995 former members of Kinderen voor Kinderen were invited to attend the 15th show (hosted by Paul de Leeuw). The ex-Frizzle Sizzles were unavailable, but they later made an in-crowd appearance at De Leeuw's own TV-show; still barefoot, as in their heyday.

Awards and achievements
Preceded by Maribelle with "Ik hou van jou"	Netherlands in the Eurovision Song Contest; 1986	Succeeded by Marcha with "Rechtop in de wind"
