= Rudi Falkenhagen =

Dutch actor (1933–2005)

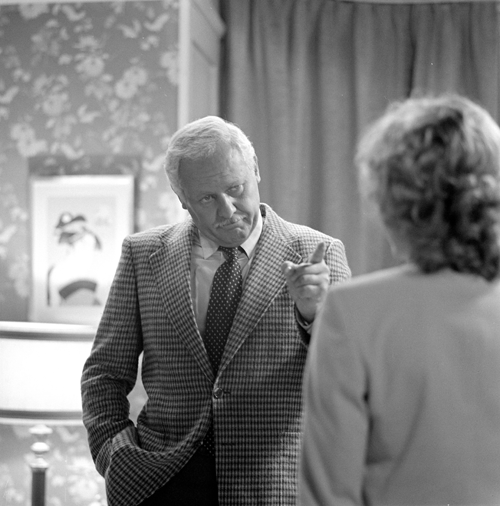
- Rudi Falkenhagen as Dries Rustenburg in De fabriek in 1981
- Born: Rudolf Johan Falkenhagen; 26 May 1933; Diemen, Netherlands
- Died: 26 January 2005 (aged 71); Breukelen, Netherlands
- Occupation: Actor
- Known for: Pipo de Clown, Ciske de rat

Rudolf Johan Falkenhagen (26 May 1933 – 26 January 2005) was a Dutch actor. He is best known for portraying the role of Snuf in the television series Pipo de Clown.

== Filmography ==
Year	Title	Role	Notes
1963	Fietsen naar de maan	Dicks Onfortuinlijke Collega	
1973	Op de Hollandse toer	De Masseur	
1975	Lifespan	Police Inspector	
1978	Meneer Klomp	Visser	
1979	Martijn en de magiër	Roderick's Vader	
1980	Spetters	Hans' Vader	
1983	De zwarte ruiter	Maurice Truidens	
1984	Ciske de Rat	Cafebaas	
1986	Dossier Verhulst	Henri Bolleman	
1988	Gaston en Leo in Hong Kong	Duitse Kolonel	
1998	The Polish Bride	Pimp	
2003	Sinterklaas en het gevaar in de vallei	Dr. Boom	
2003	Pipo en de p-p-Parelridder	Snuf	(final film role)
