= Mandy Huydts =

Dutch singer and voice actress (born 1969)

- Born: 9 April 1969 (age 56)
- Occupation(s): Voice actress, singer

Mandy Huydts (born 9 April 1969) is a Dutch singer and voice actress. She was a singer for the girl group Frizzle Sizzle and performed with them at the 1986 Eurovision Song Contest.

== Singer ==
At age 9, Huydts began her career at VARA's Kinderen voor Kinderen. In 1986 she and the girl group Frizzle Sizzle took 13th place at the 1986 Eurovision Song Contest with the song Everything has a Rhythm. Afterwards, she formed with Franky Disasters in 1990 the duo "Justian & Mandy" that resulted in the CD Friends for a Lifetime. In 1992, she started as a backing singer for René Froger (The Frogettes) and made her first solo CD in 1994.

== Voice actress ==
In addition to her work as a singer, she frequently serves as a voice actress animated films like Pokémon, Totally Spies! and Trollz. She is also a member of the Eurostars. They looked after the vocal coaching of the backing vocals during the Toppers in the Arena and sang along during Symphonica in Rosso with Paul de Leeuw. She sang in many concerts and CDs by artists including Gerard Joling and many others.

== Voice roles ==
- Totally Spies! as Alex
- Trollz as Topaz
- What's with Andy? as Teri (Season 2)

== Personal life ==
Huydts has a son.
