= Maud Hawinkels =

Dutch television presenter (born 1976)

- Born: 24 September 1976 (age 49); Echt, Netherlands
- Occupation: Television presenter
- Years active: 2000–present
- Notable work: Kinderen voor Kinderen, De Gids, We zijn zo terug en De Mannen van Mijn Leven, Natuurrijk, Kanker Leeft

Maud Hawinkels (born 24 September 1976) is a Dutch television presenter.

== Career ==
Hawinkels was born in Echt, Netherlands, and grew up in Genhout. She started training as a camera woman and eventually became the presenter of the VARA programs Honk and FF wat Anders. She then presented Kinderen voor Kinderen and the program De Gids. She then went to work for Net5. She was a reporter for Beauty & Zo and presented We zijn zo terug en De Mannen van Mijn Leven. The latter program was later canceled due to disappointing viewing figures. For Omroep Brabant, she presents the programs Dagtripper, Zinderend Zuiden, Natuurrijk and Carnaval en Route. She also presented the program Wegwijs.tv for regional broadcaster L1. In April 2019 she was diagnosed with breast cancer. A documentary about this, Kanker Leeft, in which she speaks about her experience, aired on Omroep Brabant.

She also recorded commercials and presented a radio program on NPO 3FM for some time.
