= Belinda Meuldijk =

Dutch actress, writer, and activist

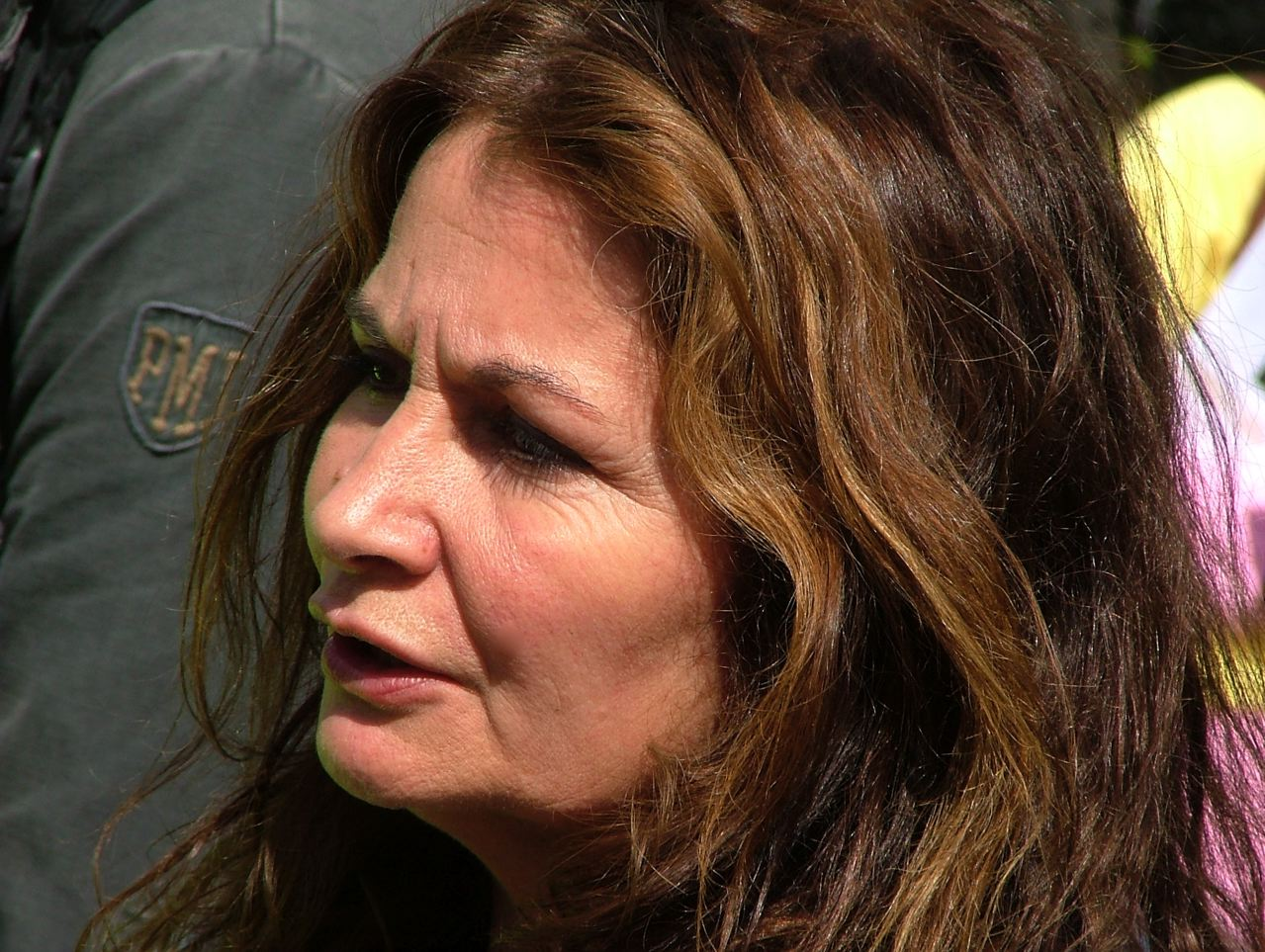
- Belinda Meuldijk in 2007
- Born: 7 January 1955 (age 70); Oostvoorne, Netherlands
- Occupation(s): Actress, writer
- Known for: Pipo de Clown, Pipo en de p-p-Parelridder, Soldier of Orange
- Spouses: Rob de Nijs (m. 1984; div. 2005) Thierry Duval (m. 2011; div. 2016)
- Children: 2

Belinda Meuldijk (born 7 January 1955) is a Dutch actress, writer, and activist. She has performed in Dutch television shows and movies, and is also a songwriter. She first performed at age six in the Pipo de Clown television show, conceived by her father, Wim Meuldijk; later, she provided the impetus for the 2003 movie Pipo en de p-p-Parelridder and produced and wrote the songs for the 2009 musical Pipo en de Gestolen Stem.

== Biography ==
Belinda Meuldijk is the daughter of Wim Meuldijk, the creator of the television show Pipo de Clown, which was on Dutch television from 1958 to 1980. She grew up surrounded by the show—the cameras and other equipment were stored in her bedroom, her father built the sets for the show at home, and sometimes shows were taped in their backyard. "Pipo is in my blood," she said.

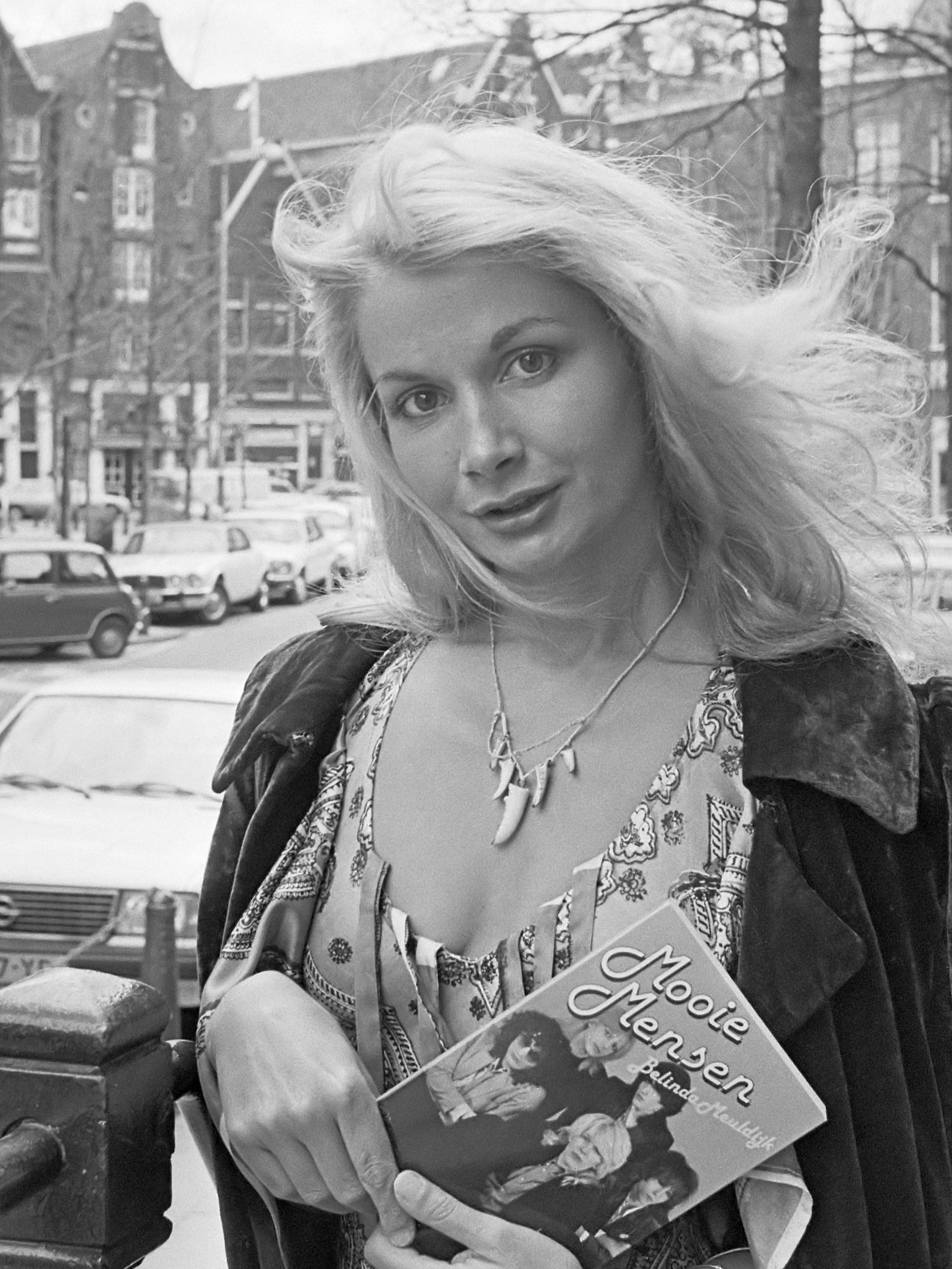
Belinda Meuldijk in 1980.

Meuldijk's first appearance on screen was in Pipo de Clown, at age six, and in 1975, she played the character Uni in the Pipo TV series Pipo en het Grachtengeheim. She had a minor part in the Wim T. Schippers' movie Volk en Vaderliefde (1976), and got her big break in the 1977 Paul Verhoeven film Soldier of Orange. She played in a few more TV movies and series including, again, a Pipo series (Pipo in West-Best, 1980), and in the soap opera Goede tijden, slechte tijden. Also she played the role of one of the three brides of Dracula in the BBC TV film "Count Dracula" (1977) directed by Philip Saville and starring by Louis Jourdan.

Later, Meuldijk continued her father's legacy and was instrumental in the production of a movie, Pipo en de p-p-Parelridder, which was released in 2003. She helped produce a 2009 musical featuring Pipo, Pipo en de Gestolen Stem, for which she wrote the song lyrics.

From 1984 to 2005 she was married to Dutch singer Rob de Nijs, for whom she wrote a number of songs (including the 1996 hit song "Banger Hart"). They had two sons, but had been living separately since 1993. Until 2009, when she was ordered by a court to leave, Meuldijk lived in the villa she and de Nijs had shared.

Meuldijk is also an activist for the rights of animals and is involved with animal rights organizations, though she has also been criticized for promoting the import of stray animals from outside the country. In 2006, she was a lijstduwer for the Party for the Animals.
