= Jan Boerstoel =

Dutch writer and poet (born 1944)

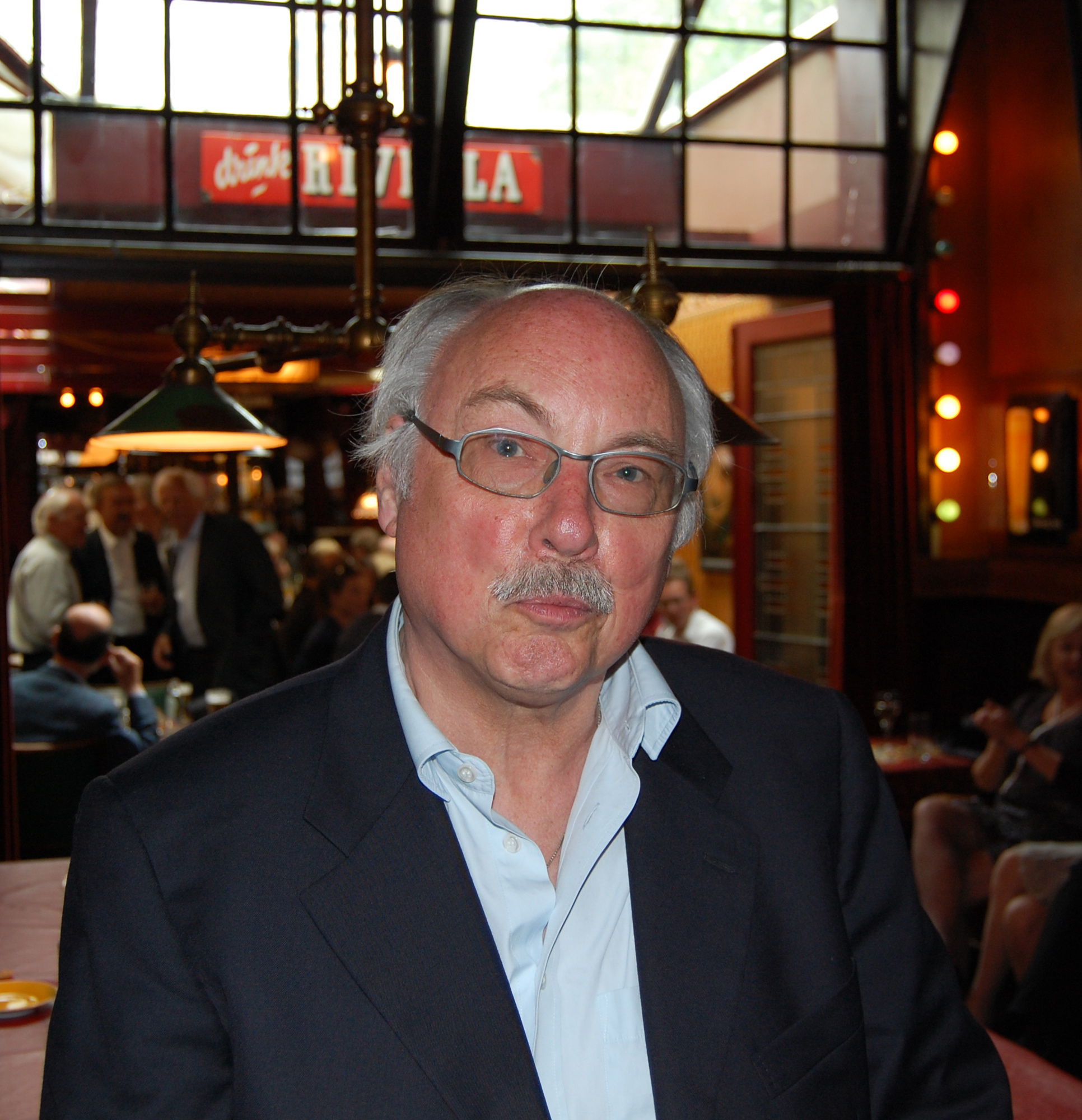
- Born: 3 November 1944; The Hague
- Occupation: writer

Jan Boerstoel (born 3 November 1944, The Hague) is a Dutch writer and poet who is perhaps best known for his song texts, especially for cabaret. He lives in Amsterdam. His poetry is melancholy, but often humorous as well. In his songs, Boerstoel frequently criticizes society. Many of his lyrics have been used by well-known Dutch artists such as Karin Bloemen, Martine Bijl, and Youp van 't Hek.

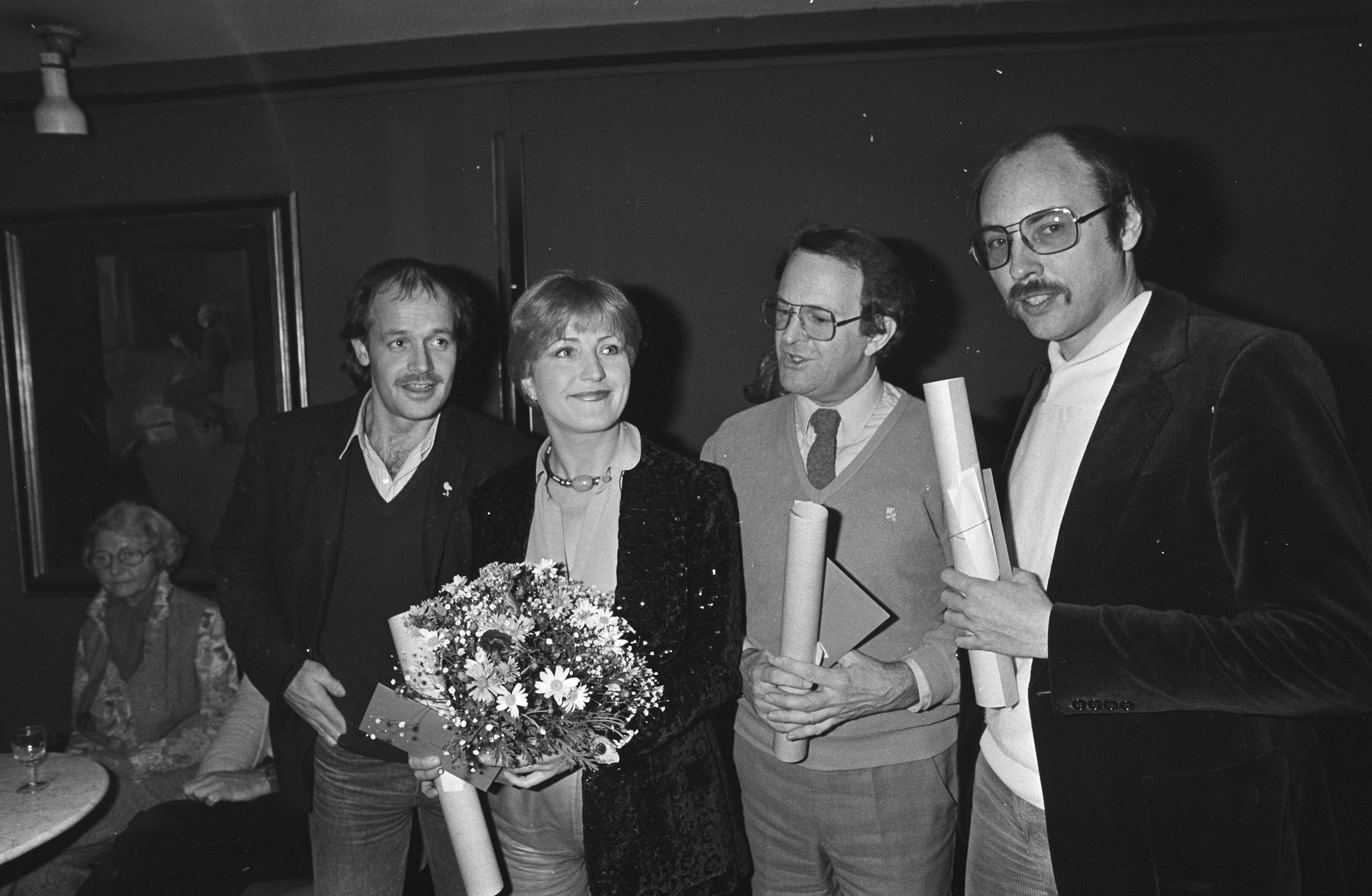
(left to right) Gerard Stellaard, Jasperina de Jong, Harry Bannink & Jan Boerstoel (Louis Davids Prize 1980)

He is the chairman of the Buma Association and the Stemra Foundation, which represents the interests of domestic and foreign music authors and publishers in the Netherlands.

== Bibliography ==
=== Poetry ===
- Drinken doet een beetje zeer. Kroegverzen. Amsterdam, Bert Bakker, 1983.
- Nieuwe vondsten. Amsterdam, Bert Bakker, 1986.
- Een beetje wees. Amsterdam, Bert Bakker, 1990.
- Veel werk. Verzamelde gedichten en liedjes 1968-1997. Amsterdam, Bert Bakker, 2000.
- Altijd het niemandsdier. Amsterdam, Bert Bakker, 2001.

=== Songs ===
- Ik denk niet dat het ooit nog overgaat. Liedjes 1968-1978. Amsterdam, C.J. Aarts, 1979.
- De mannen zijn zo slecht nog niet. Amsterdam, C.J. Aarts, 1980.
- Verre vrienden. 44 nieuwe liedjes van Jan Boerstoel, Hans Dorrestijn en Willem Wilmink. Amsterdam, Bert Bakker, 1983.
- Last van goede raad. Kinderliedjes 1973-1984. Amsterdam, Bert Bakker, 1984.
- Eerste keus. Liedteksten 1968-1986. (Bloemlezing). Amsterdam, Bert Bakker, 1987.
- Iemand moet het doen. Amsterdam, Bert Bakker, 1993.
- Veel werk. Amsterdam, Bert Bakker, 2000.
- Mooi gebleven: 46 winkeldochters. Amsterdam, Bert Bakker, 2004.
