= Kinderen voor Kinderen =

Dutch children's choir

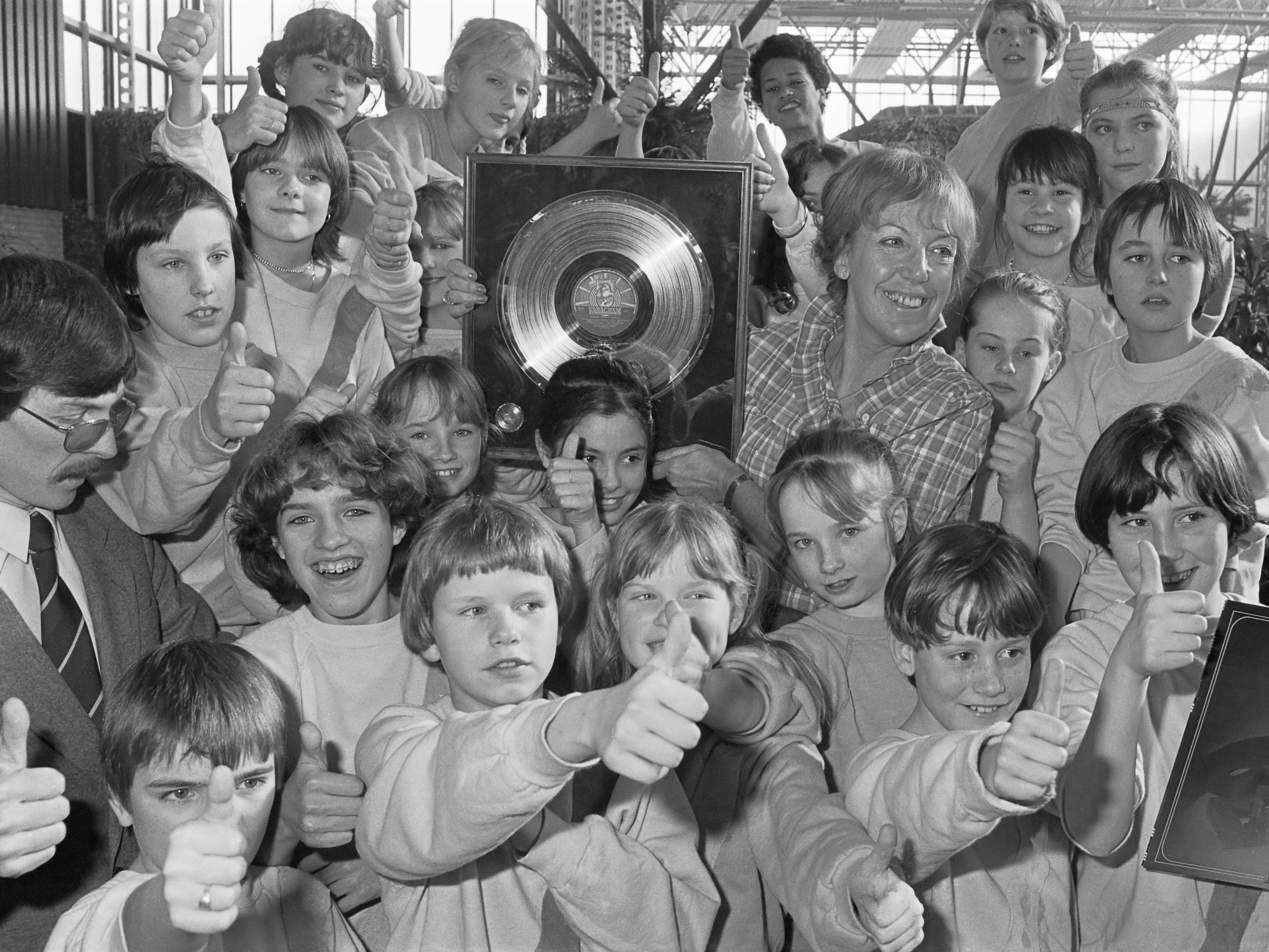
- Flory Anstadt and Kinderen voor Kinderen (1982)

Background information
- Origin: Hilversum, Netherlands
- Genres: Pop, rock, hip-hop, Broadway
- Instrument: c. 30 voices
- Years active: 1980–present
- Label: VARAgram
- Website: kvk.vara.nl

Kinderen voor Kinderen (Dutch pronunciation: [ˌkɪnd(ə)rə(ɱ) voːr ˈkɪnd(ə)rə(n)]; lit. 'Children for Children') is a Dutch children's choir maintained by public broadcaster BNNVARA. Since 1980 the choir has released one album of new children's songs each year, and is probably the only act from the 1980s with consecutive albums in the top 40 chart (apart from two releases). The ideas for the songs generally come from children who write in. Well-known Dutch lyricists then turn submitted ideas into finished songs.

The songs on each year's album are presented in a special TV broadcast, staged and recorded in advance (in the group's early years, these shows were broadcast live). Various Dutch celebrities often appear as cast members in these shows. In 2006, Kinderen voor Kinderen staged its first live pop concert as the basis of its annual broadcast. Kinderen voor Kinderen also holds an annual "Song Contest" known as the Kinderen voor Kinderen Songfestival that sees the winners of the regional pre-selection rounds (one each province) compete against each other as finalists.

== History ==
=== Concept ===
Official Kinderen voor Kinderen logo

In 1980 program director Flory Anstadt decided to start a children's choir as part of a VARA fund-raising campaign to provide toys to children in developing countries. The choir released an album of songs sung by children ranging in age from 8 to 12 years old. VARA subsequently broadcast performances of the songs on television. The choir was a success and a decision was made to release an album each year from then on. The toy donation campaign ended in 1991. The name of the choir is now the sole reminder of its original function.

In keeping with their main purpose, Kinderen voor Kinderen is still releasing charity-singles such as:

- "Morgen is een droom ("Tomorrow is a dream") (2001)
- "Voor Azië ("For Asia"), released early 2005 in a re-written version to benefit tsunami victims in Asia.
- "Het begin van het einde ("The beginning of the end"), released in the summer of 2005 to benefit the Dutch development NGO Novib.

The ensemble has been conducted by Babette Labeij since 2005. She succeeded Majel Lustenhouwer, who led the group during its first 25 years. In recognition of Kinderen voor Kinderen's contribution to Dutch culture under his guidance, Lustenhouwer received a knighthood of the Order of Orange Nassau in 2006.

For the first 21 releases, the first song on each album was always the Kinderen voor Kinderen anthem. Only albums 5 and 15 were notable exceptions as on those album the anthem was the closing track. Starting with album 22 the custom was changed to make it the closing track instead. The melody has remained the same since 1980, though the lyrics were changed after album 3 to remove a verse about children starving and sleeping in the street. The chorus has stayed the same, while verses have changed over the years to be more celebratory and inclusive, suggesting that children are more open-minded and understanding. Some of the recent albums omit the anthem entirely.

=== At present ===
The choir currently consists of around 30 children between 8 and 12 years of age (originally the age limit was 14 instead of 12). Originally the goal was to have participants from throughout the Netherlands. Over time, however, practical considerations intervened and the children recruited as singers are now required to live within close distance of the TV recording studios in Hilversum, southeast of Amsterdam. As a consequence the songs are sung with the characteristic accent of that area, the most noticeable feature of which is the so-called Gooise R: the retroflex pronunciation of the letter R at the end of words and after vowels before consonants in a manner similar to that of American English, although other Rs are realized as trills, either alveolar [r] or uvular [ʀ].

The ensemble operates on a yearly production cycle starting with auditions for new members in January. Songs are composed based on ideas from children's letters and go through a judging process, ultimately leaving 12 song choices for the year's CD. The first singing rehearsals begin in March, and dance rehearsals start in September after summer recess. The year's TV program is usually recorded during the autumn school recess. A viewing is held for the children and their families one week before the program is broadcast in November.

A 27-CD box set, released at the end of September 2007, gave the choir their first album top 10 entry in almost a decade.

=== TV broadcasts ===
==== 1980–1984 ====
- The first broadcast was on 5 December 1980 (St Nicholas Day), hosted by actor Willem Nijholt. The choir-members wore dungarees. Viewers could vote for their favourite song and "Ik heb zo waanzinnig gedroomd" (sung by Annemiek Stuurman) became a top 10 hit early 1981. The album reached number 2 in the charts. In 2001 some of the original choir members reunited for an interview conducted by Reinout Oerlemans for his I Love The 1980s-style series Typisch Tachtig.
- The second show too was hosted by Willem Nijholt (sporting a full moustache at the time). The choir was now expanded; among the new faces were Marjon Keller, Mandy Huydts and sisters Laura and Karin Vlasblom, who later went on to form the girl group Frizzle Sizzle. Martijntje van Neerven expressed her concern with the stupidity of fur-hunters in "Tweedehands Jas" ("Second hand coat"). Of the three stand-out songs "Op een onbewoond eiland" ("On a deserted island") was voted the number 1 favourite and became a top 40-hit. The album peaked at number 3.
- The third show hit the screens on 11 November 1982; this time Leonie Jansen, singer/presenter of children's news programme Jeugdjournaal introduced the songs. "Ha-ha je vader" (about children judged by their dad's profession) opened the show and was that year's single. Other memorable moments include Drummer, "Kerstmis" and "Dokter ik ben zo oliedom" ("Doctor, I'm tired of stupid"). Martijntje sang the Down's syndrome-themed ballad "M'n broertje" ("My baby brother") and the show ended with "Ik heb het allemaal niet bij me" ("I think I lost it all") before reprising the theme tune. Album 3 became the first one to top the charts.
- The fourth album and TV show included show host Willem Ruis (1945–1986). The songs had a more polished sound than previous efforts and made some references to Dutch group Doe Maar who were at the height of their popularity. "Brief aan Ernst" is a request to Doe Maar's keyboard-player to stop singing the atom bomb-themed number one-hit "De Bom". In "Vader zonder werk" ("Unemployed father", Martijntje's last contribution to the choir), the subject matter was angered by hearing the band on record. "Meidengroep" ("Girl group") became a top 20-entry, and "Wat zingen wij" ("The songs we sing") is a definite reminder that Dutch traditional children's songs are worthless to a generation that prefers to listen to top 40-hits. Like its predecessor, album 4 topped the charts.
- 16 November 1984 saw the fifth Kinderen voor Kinderen show; time to look back. Previous members were invited and some of them were interviewed by Willem Ruis. As a bridge to the new songs Frizzle Sizzle (before the name existed) sang a tribute to their days with the choir. Marjon Keller, who left after the fourth album, was still available for backing vocals. The first of the new songs is "Sluit je aan" ("Join the club"), a call for vegetarianism; the idea was actually submitted by a butcher's daughter. Robert Long (1943–2006) wrote "Als ik de baas zou zijn van het journaal" ("If I Ruled The News") which missed the top 40, unlike "Eeuwig Kerst" ("Forever Christmas"). This non-album track was recorded with former BZN-vocalist Annie Schilder and Het Goede Doel. It became the most successful Christmas-hit in Dutch. Album 5 reached second place in the charts.

==== 1985–1989 ====
- The show for the sixth album brought a change, as it was the first to be shot on location. The running order of the songs was changed precisely to chronicle the adventures of four siblings, Mark and Sasha, and teenagers Arjen and Krista. The parents were played by Ati Dijckmeester and jazz-musician Edwin Rutten. Album 6 reached number 2 and was notable for the song "Ochtendhumeur" ("Morning Glory"). Two decades later Mark appeared in a To Tell the Truth-style item on Paul de Leeuw's TV-show.
- Album 7 aired on 15 November 1986 and was a continuation of its predecessor. "Ik ben toch zeker Sinterklaas niet", written by Het Goede Doel frontmen Henk Westbroek & Henk Temming and performed with Edwin Rutten telling he's not Saint Nicholas, became a hit. TV-commercials are parodied in two songs; one of them, ("Snoepverslaving", which opens the show) namechecked addictive but fictional candy bars and chocolates. Album 7 made the top 5.
- Album 8 started off with its fair share of controversy; Freek de Jonge was scheduled to host, but pulled out after it was feared that his contribution would badly affect album sales. He was replaced with actress Simone Kleinsma and show-host Ron Brandsteder. The latter appeared on the extracted single "Moeders wil is wet" as the father dishing up overexperimental meals in mother's absence. Despite being the first single to miss the top 40 it still became a classic. The TV-show won a Silver Rose at the Montreux Festival and the album hit the number 2 slot.
- The ninth show was made with the legendary talk show host Sonja Barend who dressed up as a demented grandmother for one of the songs ("Dement"). Highlights include the mixed messages in "Hartstikke fout" ("Absolutely wrong"), "Joris en Jan" ("George and John"), who are assumed to be gay, the anti-kissing song "Kussen" "Brugsmurfblues" Brugmsurf being a contemporary Dutch slang for freshman). For the first time omissions had to be made; "Anti-auto lied" ("Anti-car song") and "Liegen dat is leuk" ("It's fun to be a liar") were not performed on the show. Album 9 reached number 5.
- From album 10 onwards, the TV-shows were shot on location again. Singer and presenter Hanneke Kappen was this year's guest-celebrity. It was broadcast with English subtitles. The orchestrations, with its jazzy and funky undertones, are reminiscent of the first three albums, but the modern influences are present as well; the hip-hop-flavoured "Stuntelkampioen" ("Fumbling champion") for example, or the Westbroek & Temming-written "Kip, patat en appelmoes" ("French fries, chicken, and apple-sauce"; a popular children's dish). Album 10 fittingly made it to number 10 .

==== 1990–1994 ====
- "New decade, new sound" was a general trend in 1990. Kinderen voor Kinderen was no exception, although the previous two albums had begun the change in direction. Henk Westbroek was now the supervisor and asked new composers to write rock-oriented songs. Tracks such as "Allemaal kabaal" ("All a lot of noise") were previewed in a Derby of the Low Countries contest for schools whose pupils performed their versions of Kinderen voor Kinderen classics. The show for the 11th album was filmed in Belgium with multi-talented artist and UNICEF-ambassador Herman van Veen. The album made it to number 5, 34 places higher than the Best Of that was released at the same time.
- The 12th show was made with Youp van 't Hek as the celebrity guest. He played a travelling salesman and sang along on "Alles is te koop" ("Everything is for sale"). Ernst Jansz, enduring a break from performing with Doe Maar, usually chronicled an impossible relationship in "Verliefd op de meester"; in this case a schoolgirl-crush on the teacher. Toon Hermans (1917–2000) made a cameo-appearance in "Mijn vader is een clown" ("My father's a clown"). "Wakker met een wijsje" ("Waking up with a melody") reached classic-status in years to come. Album 12 reached number 4 in the charts.
- The 13th show was made with Sylvia Millecam (1956–2001) as a teacher who dreams of a school trip. Other celebrities involved were Erik van Muiswinkel and Henk Westbroek. "Volwassen" questions the phrase "maturity". Album 13 made it to number 6, but single "Vuur en vlam" ("Burning passion") missed the top 40.
- In 1993 actor Coen Flink (1932–2000) played a motorbiking grandfather. In a series of prequels he took his so-called granddaughter on a trip down memory lane with former choir members playing adolescent versions of their song-characters. Album 14 reached number 7 in the charts.
- In 1994, album 15 was released; singer-songwriter Frank Boeijen wrote the lead-off single "Straf" ("Grounded"). It reached number 9. A second Best Of was also released with a house-medley of classic tunes. It reached number 22.

==== 1995–1999 ====
- With album 16 it was back to basics; singalong songs performed for a live audience which included former choir-members, and (as a first) a live-band. Paul de Leeuw presented and was the celebrity guest-vocalist in 100 Hobby's. Lead-off single was the bluesy "Mamma is morgen van mij" ("Tomorrow mummy belongs to me"). Album 16 became the choir's first regular release to miss the top 10.
- Paul de Leeuw also hosted the 17th show, which was dedicated to the parents of the children who supplied the subject matter. Bennie Jolink from dialect rock-band Normaal wrote "Vieze praatjes" ("Dirtmouth") which was released as a single with "Het Tietenlied" ("The Tits Song") on the B-side; the latter was sung by dance-pop artist to be Elize van der Horst to classic-status. Album 17 made it to number 17.
- The 18th show was hosted by Menno Bentveld, one of the faces of science program Jules Unlimited. One of the songs featured is "Pesten is geen spelletje" ("Bullying is not a game") which shared its title with an anti-bullying campaign. Album 18 became a top 10 entry.
- The 19th show took the form of a school drama with actors Marcel Faber and Joep Onderdelinden in the roles of headmaster and janitor. "Droom" ("Dream") was released on single. Album 19 made it to number 13.
- Aldith Hunkar,Jeugdjournaal-presenter at the time, hosted this 20th show full of catchy singalongs and razor-sharp messages. Majel Lustenhouwer played an audience member awarded a Most Boring Father before miming the trombone in the song of the same name. Hunkar introduced the finale by expressing her rapping skills. Album 20 reached number 7.

==== 2000–2004 ====
- The 21st show was hosted by "monkey-duo" Zap & Surf. Album 21 only reached number 23.
- The 22nd show was hosted by Maud Hawinkels who guested on a track about the upcoming replacement of Dutch guilders by Euros. Other songs are "Verliefd op een paard" ("In love with a horse") and fundraiser "Morgen is een droom" which opens the album. Album 22 peaked at 16 in the charts.
- The 23rd show was made with Klaas van der Eerden who insisted on singing a medley of Kinderen voor Kinderen classics. By the time he did so everyone already left. Album 23 became the choir's least-selling album ever, missing the charts altogether.
- After Willem Nijholt, Willem Ruis, Paul de Leeuw, Klaas van der Eerden became the fourth host to do a second show. Unlike its predecessor, album 24 made it to the charts reaching number 21.
- A historic moment; the same celebrity hosting three shows in a row. But this time Klaas van der Eerden was joined by Claudia de Breij. Album 25 reached number 15.

==== 2005–2009 ====
- In 2005 Claudia de Breij hosted the show on her own. Album 26 made it to number 14. As the choir was now officially in its 25th year, a new Best Of was released but didn't chart.
- Album 27 was the first one with a proper title: De Coolste DJ, named after the track sung by Holly Mae Brood, future actress/model and daughter of the late rock star/painter Herman Brood. De Coolste DJ made it to number 28.
- The new tradition continued with De Gamer which was chiefly written by a new generation of musicians. Claudia de Breij and comedian/marathon-runner Dolf Jansen contributed one song each. The pop concert premiered on 26 October 2007 while the TV-special was hosted by actress Isolde Hallensleben.
- A new standard was set with the release of the 29th album Buiten Spelen (Come Out And Play). The pop concert was taken to a new level and was renamed the Kinderen voor Kinderen Mega Spektakel. It was held in the Amsterdam Arena on 11 October 2008 and was hosted by sports reporter/television host Jack van Gelder and Dutch rapper Ali B.
- In 2009, the group released their 30th album, Lachen is Gezond (Laughter is Healthy) which was accompanied by a lower profile performance for a much smaller audience than previous shows. 2009 was a milestone for the group because it marked their 30th anniversary.

==== 2010–present ====
- In 2015, album 36 Raar Maar Waar (Weird But True) was released. Among the album's most popular songs was "Waarom moet ik gaan?" ("Why do I have to go?"), written in response to the European migrant crisis.
- In 2017, album 38 was released; Gruwelijk Eng (Super Scary). The song "Okido" was specifically written to line up with the 2017 Koningsspelen; to fit the royal theme, the music video was filmed in Soestdijk Palace, a former residence of the Dutch royal family.
- 2019 marked the release of album 40, Reis mee (Travel Along).
- In 2020, album 41 was accompanied by a television-special taped during the COVID-19 pandemic.
- In 2021, album 42, Worden wat je wil (Be what you want to be) was released. As part of Dutch TV's 70th anniversary, the choir-members appeared on satire-show Spaanders; they sang the theme-tune which opened and closed a classics-medley performed by the original soloists as adults.
- In 2022, album 43, Gi-ga-groen (Gi-ga-green) was released.
- In 2023, the choir recorded new versions of the sginature songs Waanzinnig gedroomd and Op een onbewoond eiland, from the respective albums 1 (1980) and 2 (1981).
- Album 44, Bij mij thuis (At home), was also released in 2023.
- Album 45, titled Lekker eigenwijs (Very stubborn), was released in October 2024.

== Topics addressed in songs ==
Kinderen voor Kinderen's songs deal with many different subjects. Some frequently recurring themes are:

- Advertising ("Snoepverslaving", "Hallekiedallekie", "De wereld van de STER")
- Animals ("Met een beesie", "Johnny mijn pony", "Beestenboel", "Miepie", "Sluit je aan" (about vegetarianism), "Honden", "Alles van paarden", "Een tweedehands jas", "Ik wil een krokodil als huisdier", "Ik wil een kangoeroe", "Domme domme dodo", "Witte muizen", "Elk dier", "Kijk Joris nou", "De natuur slaat terug", "Ik wil een huisdier")
- Antisocial behaviour ("Iedereen gaat voor z'n beurt", "Allemaal kabaal", "Buiten is het erger")
- Being in love ("Rikkie", "Ik ben verliefd", "Frisse knul", "Verliefdheid is rampzalig", "Verliefd op de meester", "Strooi kruimels", "Roosmarijn", "Zusje van mijn zus", "Vuur en vlam", "Gewoon te gewoon", "Alles", "Smoorverliefd", "Voorlopig niet verliefd", "Verliefd op een paard", "Zusje van mijn zus", "Liefdesverdriet", "Tovenaar")
- Body dysmorphic disorder ("Gewoon te gewoon", "Jij bent goed zoals je bent")
- Boredom ("Zondagmiddag", "Sleutelkind", "Verkleden", "100 hobby's" (sung by Paul de Leeuw))
- Christmas ("Kerstmis", "Als de lichtjes doven", "De kerstezel", "Hé meneer de kerstman", "Ben zo benieuwd", "Niets is cooler dan Kerstmis")
- Death (of an animal) ("Alleen", "Frederieke")
- Death (of a person) ("Mijn laatste oma", "De Lek", "Anders dan je denkt", "Mijn vader is een ster", "Het leven duurt een leven lang", "Mama (waar ben je nou?)", "Opa's laatste feestje")
- Disability ("En ik", "Mijn broertje", "LOM-kind", "Dement", "Ik st-st-stotter", "Stuntelkampioen", "Twee linkse linkerhanden", "Als niemand kijkt", "Nare dingen allergie", "Later zul je lachen", "Klein & groot", "Nep", "Oma", "Dyslectisch", "Een doodgewone jongen met ADHD", "Rock 'n' rollstoel")
- Discrimination ("LOM-kind", "Gastarbeider", "Twee Vaders", "Groen")
- Divorce ("Foto-album", "Hij", "Vier ouders", "Mijlenver", "Ik hou van hard", "Mama is morgen van mij")
- Eating ("Kom eet je bi ba boe ba bord nou leeg", "Dieet", "Moeders wil is wet", "Kip patat en appelmoes", "Het hete eten", "Ik lust alles")
- Environmental activism ("In de soep", "Anti auto-lied", "Stop")
- Escapism ("Hoekje", "Ik heb zo waanzinnig gedroomd", "Op een onbewoond eiland", "Ik ben beroemd", "Ik trek me terug op het toilet", "Ik ben zo'n kind", "De wereld van de STER", "Onderweg", "Stipjes", "Van Nederland tot Broadway", "Rauw en primitief", "Vandaag ben ik een vliegtuig", "De wijde wereld", "Gangsterdam", "Droomhuis", "Een gouden koets", "Als een meeuw boven zee")
- Forgetfulness ("Ik heb het allemaal niet bij me", "Ik ben altijd alles kwijt", "Help ik weet niet waar m'n schoenen zijn")
- Friendship ("Dikke vrienden", "Joris en Jan" (George and John), "Wij zijn kwaad", "Mijn beste vriend", "Ruzie")
- Generational conflict ("Zeuren", "Uitslapen", "Als de kat van huis is", "Naar bed", "Treuzeltechniek", "Trammelant", "Daar ben jij veel te jong voor", "Sneu", "Hartstikke fout", "Vakantie in Italië", "Ouders te koop", "Vierkante ogen", "Hé papa hé mama", "Geef die pieper toch een zwieper")
- Growing up ("Puberteitsballade", "Schipperskind", "Klein is fijn", "Heb jij 't al", "Wat ik worden wil", "Astronaut", "Brugsmurf-blues", "Ze hebben het mis", "Net als opa", "Ik wil nog dit ik wil nog dat", "Pretpakket", "Volwassen", "Tietenlied", "Zeer hoog begaafd", "Nix")
- Holidays: ("Lui zijn", "Vakantie met de tent", "Vakantieliefde", "Vakantie in Italië" (Italy), "Stom hoor", "Niet naar Ierland" (Ireland), "Vandaag even niet", "Lekker op vakantie", "Vakantie")
- Home ("Verhuizen", "Mijn oude kamer", "Hier ben ik dan", "Dozen", "Sleutels")
- Homosexuality / LGBT adoption ("Twee Vaders")
- Injustice ("Als de lichtjes doven", "Als ik de baas zou zijn van het journaal")
- International Adoption ("Vandaag gaan we je halen")
- Loneliness ("Mijn boom", "Kom je strakjes bij me spelen", "Annemiek", "Onzichtbaar", "2001", "Lege plekken in de klas", "Poster", "Nu het feestje voorbij is")
- Money ("Geld is overbodig", "Ik ben toch zeker Sinterklaas niet", "Ouders te koop", "Zakgeld" (KvK 11), "Alles is te koop", "Mijn eerste miljoen", "Kinderbijslag", "Zakgeld" (KvK 18), "Ik word miljonair")
- Moods ("Ochtendhumeur", "Droeverig gevoel", "Wakker met een wijsje", "Beetje uit m'n doen")
- Music ("De drummer", "Klassiek", "De bombardon", "De Vlooienmars", "Mijn gitaar", "Het is een bongo", "De bas", "De coolste DJ", "Drummen in een Band")
- Nostalgia ("Schuilplaats", "Teddybeer", "Het land van vroeger")
- Phobias ("Bang hoezo bang?", "Tandarts", "Spinnen", "Zwemziek", "Monster in de kast")
- Shyness ("Verlegenheid", "Rode wangen")
- Superstition ("Eén been op de stoep", "Lariekoek en apekool")
- Taunting and mobbing ("Beugelbekkie/pestbril", "De pest aan pesten", "LOM-kind", "Rik", "De kerstezel", "Ha ha ha je vader", "Jongen op ballet", "Bruin", "Bang voor de bal", "Pesten is geen spelletje", "Ik zeg maar liever niets")
- Tobacco smoking ("Roken", "De Lek", "Stoppen")
- War ("Als de lichtjes doven", "Geen huis meer", "Hé meneer de kerstman")

== Former members with notable solo careers ==
Member	KvK season(s)	Career
Iason Chronis	8–12	Part of music producer duo Mason
Sarah Chronis	17–18	Actress, appeared in the Dutch soap-opera ONM (Onderweg naar Morgen) from 2006 to 2009
Meau Hewitt	30–32	Singer-songwriter known as MEAU
Elise van der Horst	12–17	Singer known as EliZe
Mandy Huydts	2–3	Part of Dutch girl group Frizzle Sizzle
Marjon Keller	2–4	Part of Dutch girl group Frizzle Sizzle
Iris van Kempen	17–19	Part of the British-Dutch pop group XYP
Levi van Kempen	20	Actor appearing in Dutch soap ONM (Onderweg naar Morgen) from 2005 to 2010
Stefania Liberakakis	35–36	Represented Netherlands in the Junior Eurovision Song Contest 2016 and Represented Greece in the Eurovision Song Contest 2021
Elvira Out	1	Actress, appeared in the Dutch soap opera Goede tijden, slechte tijden from 2006 to 2007
Daniël Samkalden	8–12	Singer-songwriter
Kelly van der Veer	12–15	Transgender singer and television personality
Laura Vlasblom	2	Part of Dutch girl group Frizzle Sizzle

== Discography ==
=== Albums ===
List of albums, with selected chart positions
Title	Year	Peak chart positions	Certifications
Title	Year	NED	Certifications
Kinderen voor Kinderen	1981	1	
Kinderen voor Kinderen 2	1981	1	
Kinderen voor Kinderen 3	1982	1	
Kinderen voor Kinderen 4	1983	1	
Kinderen voor Kinderen 5	1984	1	
Kinderen voor Kinderen 6	1985	3	
Kinderen voor Kinderen 7	1986	1	
Kinderen voor Kinderen 8	1987	1	
Kinderen voor Kinderen 9	1988	1	
Kinderen voor Kinderen 10	1989	1	
Het beste uit... (compilation)	1990	29	
Kinderen voor Kinderen 11	1990	3	
Kinderen voor Kinderen 12	1991	4	
Kinderen voor Kinderen 13	1992	1	
Kinderen voor Kinderen 14	1993	1	
De allerbeste! (compilation)	1994	10	
Kinderen voor Kinderen 15	1994	10	
Kinderen voor Kinderen 16	1995	7	
Kinderen voor Kinderen 17	1996	17	
Kinderen voor Kinderen 18	1997	11	
Kinderen voor Kinderen 19	1998	7	
Kinderen voor Kinderen 20	1999	23	
Kinderen voor Kinderen 21	2000	16	
Kinderen voor Kinderen 22	2001	29	
Kinderen voor Kinderen 23	2002	21	
Kinderen voor Kinderen 24	2003	15	
Kinderen voor Kinderen 25	2004	14	
2005 (Deel 26)	2005	28	
De Coolste DJ – 27	2006	25	
Alle Liedjes van 1980 t/m 2006 (Het complete overzicht deel 1-27) (compilation)	2007	9	
De Gamer – 28	2007	27	
Buiten spelen – 29	2008	18	
Lachen is gezond – 30	2009	14	
30 jaar (compilation)	2009	52	
Hé jullie! – 31	2010	23	
Zo bijzonder! – 32	2011	11	
Hallo wereld – 33	2012	1	
Klaar voor de start – 34	2013	1	
De allergrootste hits van Kinderen voor Kinderen – Waanzinnig gedroomd	2014	1	
Feest – 35	2014	2	
Raar maar waar – 36	2015	1	
De allergrootste hits van Kinderen voor Kinderen – Waanzinnig gedroomd – Editie 2016	2016	10	
Voor altijd jong! – 37	2016	1	
Gruwelijk eng – 38	2017	1	
Kom erbij! – 39	2018	2	NVPI: Gold
Reis mee! – 40	2019	2	
En toen? – 41	2020	3	
Worden wat je wil – 42	2021	2	
Gi-ga-groen – 43	2022	4	
Bij mij thuis – 44	2023	11	
Lekker eigenwijs – 45	2024	25	
Vol avontuur – 46	2025	45	
Spot aan! – 47	2026	58	

=== Singles ===
List of singles, with selected chart positions
Title	Year	Peak chart positions NED	Album
"Ik heb zo wa-wa-wa-waanzinnig gedroomd"	1981	8	Kinderen voor Kinderen
"Op een onbewoond eiland"	1981	16	Kinderen voor Kinderen 2
"Ha, ha, ha, je vader"	1982	27	Kinderen voor Kinderen 3
"Meidengroep"	1983	8	Kinderen voor Kinderen 4
"Als ik de baas zou zijn van het journaal"	1984	20	Kinderen voor Kinderen 5
"Eeuwige kerst" (Anny Schilder, Kinderen voor Kinderen & Het Goede Doel)	1984	5	Single only
"Ik ben toch zeker Sinterklaas niet"	1986	22	Kinderen voor Kinderen 7
"Moeders wil is wet"	1987	51	Kinderen voor Kinderen 8
"Astronaut"	1988	70	Kinderen voor Kinderen 9
"Zomaar..."	1990	84	Kinderen voor Kinderen 11
"Vuur en vlam"	1992	49	Kinderen voor Kinderen 13
"Voor Azië"	2005	41	Single only
"Hallo wereld"	2012	8	33 – Hallo wereld
"Bewegen is gezond"	2013	5	34 – Klaar voor de start
"Klaar voor de start"	2013	14	34 – Klaar voor de start
"Doe de Kanga"	2014	27	35 – Feest!
"Feest!"	2014	89	35 – Feest!
"Energie"	2015	52	36– Raar maar waar
"Raar maar waar"	2015	64	36– Raar maar waar
"Hupsakee!"	2016	50	37 – Voor altijd jong!
"Niets is cooler dan kerstmis"	2016	74	Non-album single
"Okido"	2017	83	38 – Gruwelijk eng
"Pasapas"	2019	82	40 – Reis mee!
"Worden wat je wil"	2021	45	42 – Worden wat je wil
"FitTop10"	2022	36	43 – Gi-ga-groen
"Gi-ga-groen"	2022	36	43 – Gi-ga-groen
"ZiggZagg"	2023	27	43 – Gi-ga-groen
"Daba die daba daa"	2024	39	45 – Lekker eigenwijs
"Lekker eigenwijs"	2024	19	45 – Lekker eigenwijs
"Baila Bailalaa"	2025	28	46 – Vol avontuur
"Vol avontuur"	2025	47	46 – Vol avontuur
"Ola ole olee"	2026	20	47 – Spot aan!
"Spot aan"	2026	14	47 – Spot aan!
