= Rob de Nijs =

Dutch singer and actor (1942–2025)

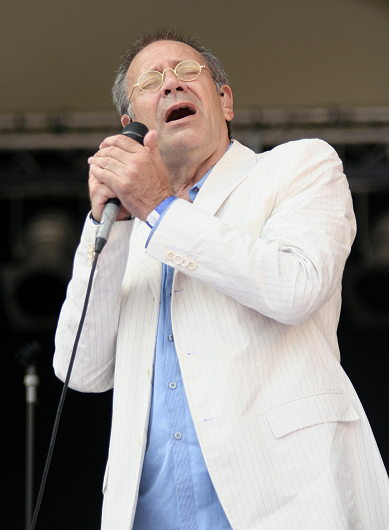
- De Nijs in 2008
- Born: Robert de Nijs; 26 December 1942; Amsterdam, German-occupied Netherlands
- Died: 16 March 2025 (aged 82); Bennekom, Netherlands
- Occupations: Singer; actor
- Years active: 1960–2022
- Spouse: Elly Hesseling (m. 1968; div. 1981) Belinda Meuldijk (m. 1984; div. 2008) Henriëtte Koetschruiter (m. 2008)
- Children: 3

Rob de Nijs (26 December 1942 – 16 March 2025) was a Dutch singer and actor.

== Life and career ==
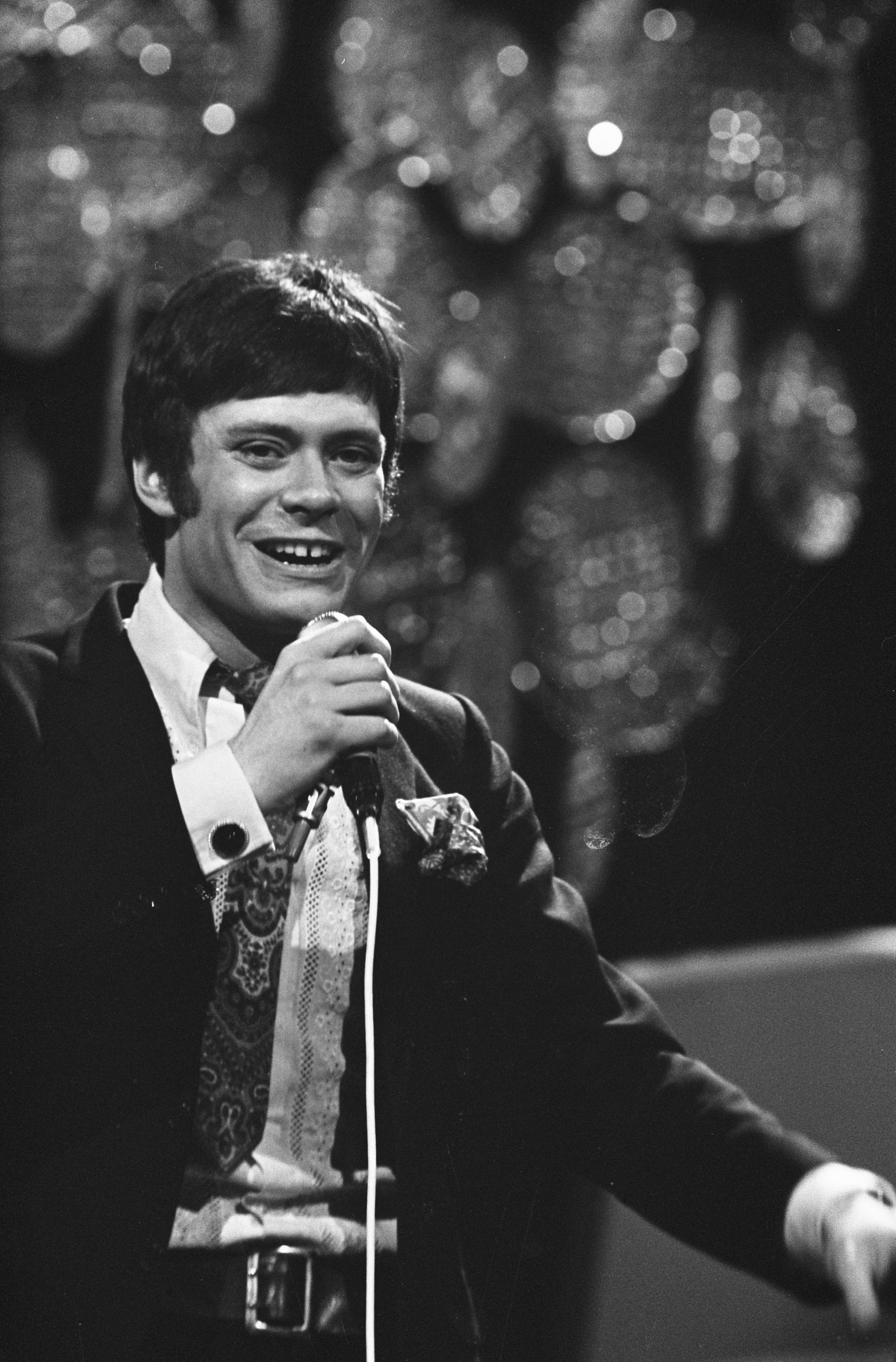
De Nijs in 1969

De Nijs, supported by The Lords, won a talent contest in 1962 and in the same year released his first single, "Ritme van de Regen", which was a great success. The Lords signed in 1965 with another label, prompting De Nijs to part ways with them and embark on a joint circus tour with Johnny Lion. By 1967, De Nijs was a free agent; he performed at small venues and worked as a bartender for a living. His attempts to keep up with the zeitgeist, including "Bye Bye Mrs. Turple", failed; he only made the headlines by marrying his girlfriend Elly. De Nijs competed in 1969 the Dutch heat of the Eurovision Song Contest, and through musicals like Sajjuns Fiksjen he secured a role in the children's TV series Oebele and Hamelen in the latter of which he played Bertram Bierenbroodspot. Singer Boudewijn de Groot and songwriter Lennaert Nijgh helped him relaunch his singing career, and in 1973 he was back in the charts with "Jan Klaassen de Trompetter".

The hits continued through 1975 and 1976, notably "Malle Babbe" and "Zet een Kaars voor Je Raam" (a Dutch translation by Lennaert Nijgh of David McWilliams's "Can I Get There by Candlelight?"). In 1977 De Nijs released Tussen Zomer en Winter, a concept album chronicling the change from a hot summer's day to a cold winter's night, which starts with the hit song "Het Werd Zomer", a translation from the Peter Maffay song "Und Es War Sommer", and ending with "In De Winter", a translation of the Janis Ian song "In The Winter". The album also features translations of Lou Reed's "Perfect Day" and The Beach Boys' "Disney Girls (1957)".

De Nijs released Met Je Ogen Dicht ("With Your Eyes Closed") in 1980, which included the top 10 hit "Zondag" and became the Netherlands' best-selling album of the year. He met Belinda Meuldijk, who gave up her own singing career (after releasing only one single in 1979) to become his chief songwriter and later his second wife; they married in 1984 and had two sons. Their first collaborative works were collected on the 1981 album De Regen Voorbij ("Past The Rain"). De Nijs had a Christmas No. 2 hit in 1985 with the peace anthem "Alles Wat Ademt" from the album Pur Sang; the English version, "Let Love Be The Answer", was later recorded by US-exile singer Joe Bourne for his album of translated cover versions, Bourne in Holland. In 1986, De Nijs released an album of covers from the 1950s and 1960s; it included his version of "Living Doll" shortly after the Comic Relief remake topped the charts.

De Nijs celebrated his silver jubilee in 1987. He re-recorded "Ritme van de Regen" for a Best Of album and made a guest appearance in television-series De Band as himself. He also released an album titled Zilver (Silver) which mostly contained his interpretations of famous Dutch songs. Two years later he released De Reiziger (Travelling Man), featuring the bilingual duet "Ik Hou Alleen Van Jou". In the same year he reprised his role as Bertram Bierenbroodspot for a Hamelen cast reunion. Stranger In Your Land followed in 1990, marking his first album of English originals and translations of "Zonder Jou" ("On My Own"; 1981 duet with Demis Roussos), "Bo" (1983) and "Toerist In Het Paradijs" (1989) which became the title track. The former ended up as the B-side of the "Girls For Sale" single.

De Nijs appeared as a judge during the finale of the Kinderen voor Kinderen festival in 1992, where he also performed the VIP-version of Allemaal kabaal (originally from the 11th edition of Kinderen voor Kinderen) with 2 children's choirs (De Waagzangertjes from Alkmaar and De Blokskes from St. Genesius-Rode, Belgium). His career reached a new peak in 1996 when a remix of "Banger Hart" became his first No. 1 hit. De Nijs entered the first decade of the 21st century with a knighthood and released albums with translations of Christmas-songs and French chansons (including "This Melody" for which Julien Clerc was flown in to sing the French parts). Meanwhile, he separated from Meuldijk after twenty years; he married for the third time and became a father again. De Nijs was 70 when he welcomed his third son Julius.

De Nijs released Eindelijk Vrij ("Free At Last") in 2010, a daring album by his standards. He marked his 50th anniversary with a tour in 2012. Two years later, he released Nieuwe Ruimte ("New Space") with contributions from Jan Rot, Boudewijn de Groot, and Daniel Lohues. In 2016, De Nijs was honoured with the Radio 5 Oeuvre Award, followed by a tribute concert. His 2017 album Niet voor het laatst ("Not for the Last Time") featured a duet with his son Robbert and renewed collaboration with Meuldijk.

De Nijs announced his retirement from performing in September 2019 after being diagnosed with Parkinson's disease. A farewell tour and a new album were scheduled for 2020, but postponed because of the corona pandemic. That same year he appeared on the talkshow De Wereld Draait Door ("The World Keeps Turning") to perform two new songs. De Nijs played the first of his two remaining farewell shows in Belgium in 2021. His final farewell concert to the Dutch public took place on 22 June 2022, in Amsterdam. The broadcast of this performance drew 1.2 million viewers.

De Nijs died in Bennekom, Netherlands, on 16 March 2025, at the age of 82, from complications of Parkinson's disease.
