= Henk Temming =

Dutch footballer

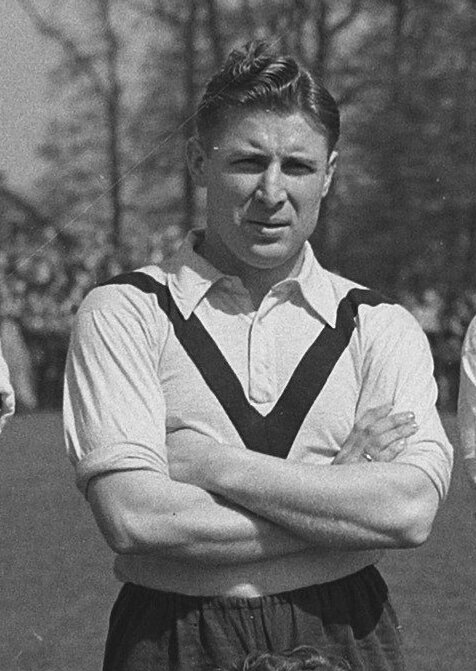
- Temming in 1954.

Personal information
- Date of birth: 17 November 1923
- Place of birth: Utrecht, Netherlands
- Date of death: 23 April 2018 (aged 94)
- Place of death: Driebergen-Rijsenburg, Netherlands
- Position: Midfielder

Senior career*
Years	Team	Apps	(Gls)
–1960	VV DOS		
1960–1961	Velox		
- * Club domestic league appearances and goals

Henk Temming (17 November 1923 – 23 April 2018) was a Dutch professional footballer who played for VV DOS and Velox. He was also part of the Dutch squad for the 1948 Summer Olympics, but he did not play in any matches. His nephew, Mosje Temming, was also a footballer.

== Honours ==
DOS

- Eredivisie: 1957–58
