= Organised crime in the Netherlands =

Dutch organised crime
- Nederlandse georganiseerde misdaad
- Founded: 18th century
- Founding location: Netherlands
- Territory: Netherlands, Belgium, France, Germany, Spain, Thailand
- Ethnicity: Predominantly Dutch, with other ethnicities including Dutch Antillean, Surinamese, Moroccan and Moluccan
- Activities: Arms trafficking, assault, drug trafficking, extortion, fraud, loan sharking, money laundering, murder, theft, prostitution
- Allies: Albanian mafia; British firms; Colombian cartels; Moroccan mafia; 'Ndrangheta; Serbian mafia; Surinamese networks; Triads; Turkish mafia; Cape Verdean gangs
- Rivals: DZ Mafia, Abou-Chaker clan, Lebanese mafia, Al-Zein clan, Miri-Clan
- Notable members: List of members

Organised crime in the Netherlands, sometimes called penose (Dutch: penoze) is the organised criminal underbelly in Amsterdam and other major cities. Penose usually means the organisations formed by criminals of Dutch descent. It is a slang word coming from the old Amsterdam Bargoens language.

== Origin of the word penose ==
Organised crime in the Netherlands goes back to the 18th century when organised groups of thieves, pimps and shady travelling salesmen created a cant language named Bargoens to communicate with each other. Penonze has in origins in the Hebrew word "parnasa", meaning livelihood. Until this day the word penoze (which arose from Bargoens) is still used by some people to describe the Dutch underworld in which the organised crime bosses thrive. The word is mostly used in Amsterdam, but has also spread to other big cities in the Netherlands such as The Hague or Rotterdam.

== Organised crime in the Netherlands ==
The Netherlands is the biggest exporter of ecstasy in the world, while Dutch gangs are a major exporter of cocaine, cannabis and a smaller exporter of heroin. In the drugs business they closely cooperate with British firms and Colombian cartels for the importation and exportation of ecstasy and cocaine, while they cooperate with Moroccan drug barons in the Riffian areas.

While the term Penose was and still is used to describe the ethnic Dutch crime lords, it has been used in a broader context.

== Dutch organised crime in other countries ==
Dutch criminals are active on Spain's Costa Brava, Costa Blanca and Costa del Sol, as well as the islands of Ibiza and Mallorca. Dutch criminal expatriates in the country are involved in drug trafficking, utilising Spain's position as an entry point for Colombian cocaine to smuggle drugs to the Netherlands and associating with British firms in some cases. Additionally, Dutch criminals invest in property and legitimate businesses such as hotels and clubs, which provides opportunities for money laundering. A crackdown on motorcycle gangs in the Netherlands has resulted in increased activity of Dutch criminal bikers on the Costa del Sol, while Dutch Moroccan drug gangs are also active in the area.

Dutch fugitives have taken residence in Thailand and have also been involved in money laundering in the country.

== Foreign criminal activity in the Netherlands ==
Since approximately 2005 there has been an increase in foreign organised criminal groups committing offences in the Netherlands. For instance, on 19 May 2021, an armed car robbery ended in a large-scale police chase through Amsterdam, the death of a suspect, wounding of two more suspects, the arrest of seven suspects and the burning of two high-end get-away vehicles.

At 14:15 p.m. several reports were made about an armed robbery on the Meeuwenlaan in northern Amsterdam. It was reported that around 7 masked and heavily armed people were shooting their weapons, loading gold and diamonds in the back of three vehicles and then fleeing the scene. The gold and diamonds were reportedly stolen from a Brinks heavily guarded money transport, which was making a delivery at Schöne Edelmetaal (precious metals) and worth around €50 million.

After the suspects fled the scene in a Porsche Cayenne, an Audi RS6 and a Renault Espace they ran into police, who responded with a helicopter and according to witnesses, around 40 vehicles. In the town of Broek in Waterland, around eight kilometers north of Amsterdam, the vehicles partially split up. The driver of the Renault drove into a garden of a resident and opened fire on the police officers chasing him. The police officers returned fire and the suspect was killed in this shootout.

The other vehicles were abandoned and set on fire, after which the remaining suspects fled into a field. The police were again shot at and in the returned fire two suspects were wounded. In total six suspects were arrested. Several hours later another suspect was arrested while driving on the A16 highway near Rotterdam. Reports state that the suspects have Belgian and French nationalities. The vehicles also carried Belgian and French license plates. The suspect killed in the cross-fire was a 47-year-old French citizen.

== Criminal groups concerning the penose ==
The penose concerns organised criminal groups with ties to the country of the Netherlands itself. Due to immigration there are strong Turkish, Chinese, Yugoslav, Russian, Albanian and Italian communities in the Netherlands. Criminal outfits such as the Turkish mafia, Triads, Serbian mafia, Russian mafia, Albanian mafia, and the 'Ndrangheta are not regarded as a part of the traditional Penose, although they're an active part of the Dutch criminal underworld nonetheless. The reason why Surinamese, Antillean, Moroccan and Ambonese groups are considered to be a part of the Penose is because their criminal groups were formed and based in the Netherlands, whereas the Turkish or Serb gangs are part of a criminal group based in their home country.

=== Dutch crime groups ===
Indigenous organised crime based in some of The Netherlands' major cities, mainly Amsterdam and The Hague, mostly has origins in the traditional working-class quarters. These small groups mainly consist of local career criminals that band together for their involvement in organised criminal activities such as extortion, loan sharking, prostitution and narcotics. Often these local criminals groups are strongly connected with, or in some cases even have an official membership to, outlaw motorcycle gangs such as the Hells Angels.

Another type of indigenous organised crime is mainly based in the Flemish regions bordering the Netherlands, mainly located in the provinces of Limburg and Antwerp. The region is known to be one of the most important production areas for synthetic drugs such as ecstasy. It is home to organised criminal gangs active in the production, transport and distribution of synthetic narcotics and marijuana, as well as in the importation of hashish and cocaine, controlled by both local Flemish and Dutch criminal entrepreneurs.

=== Moroccan crime groups ===
Out of the Netherlands' substantial Moroccan community also grew criminal gangs mostly involved in the trafficking of marijuana. This is due to the ties of some families to their area of origin, the Rif, which is a known hub of marijuana/hashish cultivating. Certain criminals have also progressed to the trafficking of cocaine. Armed robbery and prostitution are known activities of the Dutch Moroccan groups as well, called the Mocro Maffia.

=== Moluccan Kajahatan ===
The word kejahatan is Indonesian for 'committing crime' and has since become a synonym for Moluccan organised crime. Due to the Netherlands' large Moluccan Ambonese community kejahatan groups also exist in the Netherlands. Dutch Ambonese gangsters are involved in kidnapping, armed robbery, extortion and drug trafficking, especially the growing and illegally distributing of marijuana. An alleged criminal gang of Ambonese origin is Satudarah, a known one-percenter motorcycle club. Ambonese gangsters have traditionally also assisted other criminal enterprises. Incidents with the so-called Tattoo killers, a Moluccan/Ambonese gang specialised in contract killing, have also been major news in the Dutch criminal underworld in recent years.

=== Afro-Dutch crime groups ===
Criminal groups consisting of descendants of Afro-Surinamese and Afro-Curaçaoan immigrants exist in major cities in the Netherlands. While some of said groups are involved in petty crimes, other Afro-Dutch crime groups have been responsible for the more sophisticated trafficking of cocaine. Since both Suriname and the Netherlands Antilles are known transit zones for the drug trafficking from Colombia, Curaçaoan and Surinamese crime groups based in the Netherlands have also formed alliances with said Colombian groups and have committed contract killings for them. Prostitution, hijacking and ripdeals are known activities of Afro-Surinamese and Afro-Curaçaoan groups.

Gang wars over turf have appeared from time to time. The Amsterdam district Bijlmermeer for instance has been the scene of violence between two of its biggest gangs, the Hopi Boys and the Kloekhorststraat Gang. Aside from these Netherlands-originated groups, gangs that originated in the Caribbean have also been able to set up shop in the Netherlands. The No Limit Soldiers gang, which originated in Curaçao, for instance now has bases in cities such as Rotterdam, where they're involved in gang violence and organised crime.

==== Crips in the Netherlands ====
The Netherlands is the only country in Europe where the Crips have a significant presence. In the major cities of The Hague, Rotterdam and Amsterdam Crip-gangs were formed in the 80's. There are many Crip-gangs in the Netherlands but only 12 of them are regarded as a serious criminal organisation. The 12 criminal gangs are mostly composed of older adolescent males (in contrast to the majority of the street gangs which are composed of youths) who are involved in organised crime such as drug trafficking, arms trafficking, prostitution, contract killing and extortion. The groups are mainly composed of Dutch Antilleans (mainly Afro-Curaçaoans) and Afro-Surinamese people.

== Notable Dutch gangsters ==
- Willem van Boxtel, the long-time president of the Amsterdam Hells Angel chapter was described by the Canadian journalists Julian Sher and William Marsden as the man who created "one of the most powerful underworld organizations in Europe".
- Klaas Bruinsma trafficked hashish from Pakistan. His nickname was De Dominee ("The Reverend") due to his habit of dressing in black and lecturing others.
- Louis Hagemann, known as "Long Louis", Hells Angel convicted in 2003 of murdering a family in 1984.
- Willem Holleeder was one of the perpetrators of the Heineken kidnapping in 1983. In the early 2000s, he extorted real estate trader Willem Endstra. Endstra was later killed by Holleeder.
- Cor van Hout was the mastermind behind the kidnapping of Freddy Heineken. After serving jail time, he went back into the underworld together with his brother-in-law Willem Holleeder. He was assassinated in 2003, following other unsuccessful assassination attempts in 1996 and 2000.
- John Mieremet and Sam Klepper made up a successful duo in the criminal underworld. They were mostly involved in the hashish trade and robberies. In 2005, Mieremet was shot in Thailand.
- Ridouan Taghi, the main suspect in the Marengo trial.
- Paul de Vries, known as "the Butcher", president of the Hells Angels Limburg chapter and considered to be one of the most violent Dutch criminals. De Vries was killed by his fellow Hells Angels in 2004.
