= 2007 in the Netherlands =

- Decades: 1980s; 1990s; 2000s; 2010s; 2020s
- See also: Other events of 2007; History of the Netherlands

This article lists some of the events that took place in the Netherlands in 2007.

== Incumbents ==
- Monarch: Beatrix
- Prime Minister: Jan Peter Balkenende

== Events ==
=== January ===
- January 1: A redivision of local government in North Holland, South Holland, Gelderland and Limburg comes into effect. Twenty-four existing municipalities are merged to form nine new municipalities. The total number of municipalities of the Netherlands is decreased from 458 to 443.
- January 1: Three people are killed as a result of New Year's fireworks. An elderly couple in Maassluis dies when their house burns down as a result of fireworks gone astray. A 36-year-old man from Barendrecht dies in Hendrik-Ido-Ambacht when fireworks explode in his face.
- January 1: A 19-year-old man from Bennebroek, North Holland, goes missing after a New Year's party. A search ensues, even leading to pleas for help and information being sent via the Hyves networking site.
- January 3: A container ship rams a railway bridge over the Oude Maas river between Dordrecht and Zwijndrecht, South Holland.
- January 4: Bram Moszkowicz, lawyer for Willem Holleeder, accuses Amsterdam police of inducing local real estate magnates to have his client assassinated. Holleeder is currently on trial for the alleged extortion and murder of several real estate magnates in Amsterdam.
- January 4: De Telegraaf newspaper reports that Jan Peter Balkenende and Maxime Verhagen (CDA), Wouter Bos and Jacques Tichelaar (Labour Party), André Rouvoet and Arie Slob (ChristianUnion) are having secret negotiations about the formation of a new government. The talks are being held at the Lauswolt mansion near Beetsterzwaag, Friesland.
- January 8: House of Representatives member Krista van Velzen (Socialist Party) is arrested during a demonstration against ballistic missile submarines outside Her Majesty's Naval Base Clyde in Scotland.
- January 9: Police in Landgraaf, Limburg arrest a 36-year-old man on suspicion of the 1998 murder of 11-year-old Nicky Verstappen in nearby Brunssum. The suspect is alleged to have placed several letters on Nicky's monument throughout the years, detailing several aspects of the murder.
- January 9: Willem Holleeder gives an interview to crime journalist John van den Heuvel's RTL 4 program Bureau Van den Heuvel about his trial. Holleeder denies all the allegations made against him, and says that he will present new facts about murdered banker Willem Endstra. Holleeder is suspected of involvement with the murder, and of the extortion of Endstra. The interview was Holleeder's first interview since the Freddy Heineken kidnapping in 1983.
- January 11: The city of Groningen announces plans for a tramway system. The first line, between the train station and the university campus, is scheduled to run in 2014. By 2040 the tramway system is expected to be connected to surrounding municipalities, such as Assen, Hoogezand-Sappemeer, Veendam, Winsum, and Zuidhorn.
- January 12: Former House of Representatives member Patricia Remak (VVD) is sentenced to one year in prison for benefit fraud. She received severance pay after leaving parliament, but didn't file her new income as an employee for the Ministry of Finance and as an independent member of the parliament of South Holland.
- January 12: Chemical company Akzo Nobel announces it will transfer its corporate headquarters from Arnhem to Amsterdam in July 2007. In previous years companies like Ahold (originally from Zaandam) and Philips (originally from Eindhoven) have moved their offices to Amsterdam as well.
- January 12: Fortune magazine names Philips CEO Gerard Kleisterlee its European Businessman of the Year for restructuring the electronics conglomerate.
- January 12: A car chase in Wapenveld leads to the deaths of two brothers (aged 21 and 18), a 22-year-old man and a 19-year-old girl. The four were chasing two members of a rivalling group through Wapenveld when they veered off the road and crashed into a tree.
- January 17: Seven valuable bronze statues are stolen from the garden of the Singer Museum in Laren. Among the works is a bronze cast of The Thinker by Auguste Rodin. Two men from nearby Muiderberg are arrested on suspicion of the theft a day later.
- January 17: VVD fractievoorzitter in the Utrecht Provincial Council Sjoerd Swane is arrested on suspicion of forgery and accepting bribes.
- January 18: European windstorm Kyrill hits the Netherlands. Two people are killed as a tree falls on their car on the road between Arnhem and Ede. A motorcyclist in Leersum dies after a collision with a tree, just like a moped rider in Sint Oedenrode. An 11-year boy in Riel, North Brabant is blown in front of a car and dies on the scene. A 59-year-old man in Staphorst dies after a fall from the roof of his barn. He had been on the roof to repair the damage caused by the storm. Six people are injured when a crane crashes through the roof of a Utrecht University building. Amsterdam Centraal railway station is evacuated as part of the glass roof collapses.
- January 19: The body of the 19-year-old man from Bennebroek, North Holland, who had gone missing after a New Year's party, is found in a canal near the location of the party.

=== February ===
- February 19: Bram Moszkowicz announces during a press conference that he has withdrawn as the lawyer of Willem Holleeder.
- February 22: The Fourth Balkenende cabinet is sworn into office by Queen Beatrix.

=== March ===
- March 7: Provincial elections are held in the twelve Provinces of the Netherlands.
- March 11: Riots break out in the Ondiep district of Utrecht, after a police officer shoots dead a 54-year-old resident.

=== October ===
- October 1: Former House of Representatives member Ayaan Hirsi Ali returns to the Netherlands. The Dutch government refused to pay for her security measures in the United States any longer.
- October 9: Former lawyer Bram Zeegers is found dead in his home in Amsterdam. Zeegers was a key prosecution witness in the trial of Willem Holleeder. An autopsy showed an overdose of methylenedioxymethamphetamine in combination with excessive alcohol consumption.
- October 10: A referendum on the new mayor of Utrecht fails, with a turnout of less than 10%. There were two candidates: Aleid Wolfsen and Ralph Pans, both of the Labour Party. A mayor in the Netherlands is appointed by Queen Beatrix or by the Minister of the Interior and Kingdom Relations, but a city council may hold a non-binding referendum on the issue.
- October 11: After the mayoral referendum of October 10, the city council of Utrecht nominates Aleid Wolfsen to become the next mayor.
- October 11: A 16-year-old pupil of a high school in Amsterdam is stabbed to death by a 14-year-old classmate. The victim had allegedly made a joke about the surname of the perpetrator.
- October 14: A 22-year-old man with schizophrenia is shot dead in a police station in Slotervaart, Amsterdam, after stabbing two police officers. The death leads to riots in the Slotervaart borough.
- October 15: Rita Verdonk announces that she will leave the House of Representatives parliamentary group of the People's Party for Freedom and Democracy, and that she will remain in the House as an independent member.
- October 17: House of Representatives member Rita Verdonk, who had been expelled from the People's Party for Freedom and Democracy, announces that she will form a new movement, Proud of the Netherlands.
- October 20: Princess Ariane is baptized in the Kloosterkerk in The Hague.
- October 22: A fire in the Armando Museum in Amersfoort destroys 19 paintings and a sculpture of artist Armando. Other works of art lost in the fire include Melencolia I by Albrecht Dürer and paintings by Salomon van Ruysdael, Hercules Seghers and Anselm Kiefer. It was the first museum fire in the Netherlands since the fire in the Schielandshuis in Rotterdam in 1864.
- October 26: The royal family seeks an injunction against pro-pedophilia organisation MARTIJN. The organisation had refused to remove pictures of Princess Catharina-Amalia (daughter of crown prince Willem-Alexander) and of Anna and Lucas van Lippe-Biesterfeld van Vollenhoven (children of Prince Maurits) from its website, which the royal family had demanded.
- October 26: The city council of Almere approves plans to expand the city to 350,000 inhabitants by the year 2030, twice its current size.
- October 29: Adnan al-Mansouri reports that his father, Iranian-Dutch human rights activist Abdullah al-Mansouri, has received the death penalty in Iran, on allegations of terrorism. Al-Mansouri had been arrested in Syria in May 2006, and had been extradited to Iran. Several political parties call on the government to do the utmost to rescue Al-Mansouri's life.
- October 30: Fugitive Belgian criminal Nordin Benallal is arrested after a robbery in The Hague. Benallal had escaped from a maximum security prison in Ittre, Belgium on October 28
- October 31: Hans van den Hende succeeds Tiny Muskens as Bishop of Breda.

=== November ===
- November 1: A judge in Amsterdam orders pro-pedophilia organisation MARTIJN to remove pictures of Princess Catharina-Amalia (daughter of crown prince Willem-Alexander) and of Anna and Lucas van Lippe-Biesterfeld van Vollenhoven (children of Prince Maurits) from its website.
- November 3: Press agency Geassocieerde Pers Diensten accuses the Communications department of the Ministry of Social Affairs and Employment of illegally accessing draft articles. Two employees of the Ministry, both former journalists for the press agency were suspended, one journalist of the press agency quits, after admitting he supplied a password to the press agency's internal computer system to a spokesperson of the ministry.
- November 5: A. F. Th. van der Heijden wins the 2007 AKO Literatuurprijs for his novel Het Schervengericht.
- November 8–9: The Netherlands and Great Britain are hit by a North Sea flood. The storm surge barriers Oosterscheldekering, Hartelkering and Maeslantkering are closed, the latter for the first time since its opening in 1997.
- November 12: The prosecution asks a 12-year prison sentence for Willem Holleeder, who is on trial for extortion.
- November 12: Minister of Economic Affairs Maria van der Hoeven launches an investigation into the possibilities of a Dutch bid for the 2028 Summer Olympics.

=== December ===
- December 9: Three new railway stations are opened in the Netherlands: Purmerend Weidevenne in Purmerend, Heerlen De Kissel in Heerlen and Eygelshoven Markt in Eygelshoven.
- December 12: The Tielerwaard and the Bommelerwaard experience a power blackout, after a Royal Netherlands Air Force AH-64 Apache hits a power transmission line near Hurwenen, during a night training flight. The supply of power is restored on the evening of December 14.
- December 15: Mayors Job Cohen of Amsterdam and Ivo Opstelten of Rotterdam forbid the Eredivisie matches Ajax-PSV and Feyenoord-AZ, respectively. A strike by police officers meant that the mayors couldn't guarantee the presence of a police force during the matches.
- December 18: Police in Groningen arrest a 20-year-old man from 't Zandt and a 20-year-old woman from Uithuizen, on suspicion of 18 cases of arson in and near 't Zandt.
- December 19: The Provincial Executive of North Holland approves plans to construct the Wieringerrandmeer, a lake that would turn the polder of Wieringen back into an island.
- December 24: A restaurant in Arnemuiden, Zeeland, burns down on Christmas Eve. The four children of the owners (aged 8, 7, 3 and 1), who were sleeping in the house above the restaurant, die in the flames.
- December 31: Three men are arrested in Rotterdam, on suspicion of plotting to commit a terrorist attack during New Year's celebrations in the city.

== Sport ==
- August 15: Ellen van Dijk wins the 2007 Dutch National Time Trial Championships – Women's time trial.

=== See also ===
- 2006–07 Eredivisie
- 2006–07 Eerste Divisie
- 2006–07 KNVB Cup
- 2007 Johan Cruijff Schaal

== Births ==
- February 10: Jade Kops, social media influencer and cancer victim (d. 2026)
- April 10: Princess Ariane of the Netherlands, daughter of King Willem-Alexander and Queen Máxima

== Deaths ==
=== January ===
- January 4: Jan Schröder, 65, professional cyclist.
- January 14: Robert Noortman, 60, art dealer and philanthropist.
- January 15: Aart Koopmans, 60, founder of the Alternative Elfstedentocht.
- January 20: Alida de Vries, 92, runner at the 1936 Summer Olympics.

=== February ===
- February 7: Thijs Roks, 76, cyclist, first Dutch cyclist in the Giro d'Italia, 1955 national champion
- February 17: Nedim Imac, 40, businessman, chairman of FC Türkiyemspor, shot dead.
- February 22: Fons Rademakers, 86, Academy Award winning film producer, director and actor.

=== August ===
- August 16: Jeroen Boere, 39, former football player

=== October ===
- October 19: Jan Wolkers, 81, author and artist.
- October 27: Henk Vredeling, 82, Minister of Defence in the Den Uyl cabinet, European Commissioner for Employment, Social Affairs & Equal Opportunities (1977–1981)
- October 27: Pierre Janssen, 81, art journalist for Het Vrije Volk and AVRO, winner of the 1961 Zilveren Nipkowschijf
- October 30: Teun Tolman, 83, House of Representatives member (1963–1979, for CHU) and Member of European Parliament (1978–1989, for CDA)

=== November ===
- November 8: Aad Nuis, 74, literary journalist and politician, staatssecretaris for Culture and Media at the Ministry of Education, Culture and Science in the first Kok cabinet

=== December ===
- December 27: Wim Meuldijk, 85, screenwriter, creator of Pipo de Clown television series.

== Sports ==
See worldwide 2007 in sports

- January 1: The 74th traditional New Year's match between the Koninklijke HFC and the former Dutch international players ends in a 3–1 win for Oranje, which scores its fourth consecutive victory. The Oranje goals are scored by Aron Winter, Rob Witschge and Orlando Trustfull.
- January 1: Raymond van Barneveld wins the 2007 PDC World Darts Championship.
- January 7: Ingmar Berga wins the Dutch marathon speed skating championships in Amsterdam. Berga finishes ahead of Arjan Stroetinga (2nd) and Jan Maarten Heideman (3rd) after the 60 kilometer race. The woman's race (28 km) is won by Elma de Vries.
- January 7: Erben Wennemars wins the men's Dutch sprint speed skating championships held in Groningen, finishing ahead of Jan Bos (2nd) and Beorn Nijenhuis (3rd). Marianne Timmer wins the women's title, the ninth national sprint title of her career.
- January 7: Lars Boom wins the Dutch national cyclo-cross championships in Woerden, Utrecht. Daphny van den Brand wins the women's competition.
- January 8: NEC Nijmegen announces that it has a debt of several million euros, largely due to the purchase of expensive players such as Edgar Barreto and Andrzej Niedzielan. The Royal Dutch Football Association places the club under guardianship.
- January 9: Anna Pobokova (19), Dutch national rhythmic gymnastics champion, is seriously injured in a traffic incident in her hometown Bergen op Zoom. She gets hit by a car and sustains a severe concussion, as well as a broken eyesocket. Pobokova was about to return to international competition this weekend after a severe injury had kept her sidelined for almost two years.
- January 11: The Royal Dutch Football Association places Eerste Divisie football club RBC Roosendaal under guardianship for financial troubles.
- January 13: Sven Kramer wins the 2007 European Speed Skating Championships.
- January 17: Amstel Tijgers of Amsterdam win the Dutch ice hockey cup final, by defeating Eaters Geleen 3–2 in overtime (2-2, 0-0, 0-0, 1–0).
- January 19: UEFA suspends Feyenoord from the UEFA Cup 2006-07 after hooligan riots during a tie with AS Nancy.
- April 15: Long-distance runner Luc Krotwaar wins his seventh Dutch marathon title, clocking 2:15:27.4 in the Rotterdam Marathon.
- October 8: Manager Henk ten Cate leaves Ajax to become assistant manager of Chelsea.
- October 29: Jaap Stam announces his retirement from football, with immediate effect.
- October 31: Manager Ronald Koeman announces that he will move from PSV to Valencia CF with immediate effect.
- November 11: Gert Aandewiel is sacked as Sparta Rotterdam manager, following the worst start to the competition in the club's history.
- November 12: Adri van Tiggelen is appointed manager of Sparta Rotterdam.
- November 14: A delegation of the Royal Dutch Football Association and the Royal Belgian Football Association meets with FIFA on the bid for the 2018 FIFA World Cup.
- November 15: Hoofdklasse clubs Kloetinge and Spakenburg are deducted 1 point for violence on the pitch during their September 29 encounter.

== See also ==
- 2007 in Dutch television
