= Kops =

Kops is a surname. Notable people with the surname include:

- Alexander Kops (born 1984), Dutch politician
- Aranka Kops (born 1995), Dutch rowing cox
- Bernard Kops, British writer
- Ebbe Kops (1930–2021), Danish boxer
- Erich Kops (1905–1961), German politician, diplomat, and Holocaust survivor
- Erland Kops (1937–2017), Danish badminton player
- Hailey Kops (born 2002), Israeli pair skater
- Jade Kops (2007–2026), Dutch social media influencer and author
- James Kops, Papuan rugby player
- Jan Kops (1765–1849), Dutch agronomist
- Poul Kops, Danish boxer

== See also ==
- Raquel Kops-Jones, American tennis-player
- Kubernetes, a computing platform whose setup tool is called "kops"
- Karachi Kops, a British documentary series from 1994
- Keystone Kops, 1910s slapstick films
