= Yab Yum =

Yab Yum may refer to:

- Yab-Yum, a symbol of the tantric union of male and female in Tibetan Buddhism
- Yab Yum (brothel), a famous former brothel in the Netherlands
- Yab Yum (later Edmonds Record Group), a former American record label distributed via 550 Music
