= No Limit Soldiers (organized crime group) =

- Founding location: Willemstad, Curaçao
- Territory: Curaçao, Netherlands
- Ethnicity: Afro-Curaçaoans, Afro-Caribbeans, Afro-Jamaicans, Haitians
- Criminal activities: Drug trafficking, arms trafficking, extortion, assassination, contract killing, illegal gambling and money laundering
- Allies: Colombian cartels Penose; Yardies; Zoe Pound

The No Limit Soldiers are an organized crime group and street gang from Curaçao.

== Origin ==
The No Limit Soldiers find their origins in the impoverished neighborhood of Koraal Specht in Willemstad, Curaçao. In analogy with other Caribbean nations, certain neighborhoods in Curaçao suffer from high poverty rates. Curaçao's close proximity with Venezuela, which is a known hiding place for Colombian crime groups, offers a way out for people living in the impoverished suburbs. While young Dutch Antilleans have a history for being used as drug mules, more organized criminal groups such as the No Limit Soldiers evolved from local street gangs.

== Activities ==
The gang is involved in high-intensity drug trafficking operations into the Netherlands. Since the Netherlands has a large Afro-Curaçaoan community, cells of the gang have sprung up in cities like Rotterdam, The Hague and Amsterdam. Members from Curaçao cooperate with gang members living in the Netherlands to smuggle cocaine they obtain from Colombian as well as Jamaican businesspartners into major Dutch cities. From there it is distributed to smaller dealers.

Another major activity of the gang are contract killings. The gang is known for operating murder-for-hire squads that are used to eliminate rival drug trafficking operations in Curaçao as well as in the Netherlands. Colombian crime groups as well as criminal organizations from the Dutch penose are known for doing business with the Afro-Curaçaoan gang in the committing of contract killings.

The gang is alleged to be involved in assassinations and have been connected with the murder of Curaçaoan politician Helmin Wiels.
