= Hingst =

Hingst is a surname. Notable people with the surname include:

- Ariane Hingst (born 1979), German footballer and analyst
- Carolin Hingst (born 1980), German pole vaulter
- Evert Hingst (1969–2005), Dutch lawyer
- Hans Hingst, German SS officer
- Marie Sophie Hingst (1987–2019), German historian, blogger, and fraudster
- Sérgio Hingst (1924–2004), Brazilian actor
