= 2007 in Dutch television =

This is a list of Dutch television related events from 2007.

== Events ==
- 24 February – Sharon Kips wins the first series of X Factor.
- 26 May – RTL weathergirl Helga van Leur and her partner Marcus van Teijlingen win the third series of Dancing with the Stars.

== Television shows ==
=== 1950s ===
- NOS Journaal (1956–present)

=== 1970s ===
- Sesamstraat (1976–present)

=== 1980s ===
- Jeugdjournaal (1981–present)
- Het Klokhuis (1988–present)

=== 1990s ===
- Goede tijden, slechte tijden (1990–present)
- De Club van Sinterklaas (1999-2009)

=== 2000s ===
- Idols (2002-2008, 2016–present)
- Dancing with the Stars (2005-2009)
- X Factor (2006–present)

== Networks and services ==
=== Launches ===
Network	Type	Launch date	Notes	Source
Slam!TV	Cable television	1 February		
Nat Geo Wild	Cable television	1 March		
13th Street	Cable television	30 May		
Lite TV	Cable television	4 July		
Nick Hits	Cable television	2 August		
Het Gesprek	Cable television	2 October		
Bebe TV	Cable television	October		
Chinese Radio and TV	Cable television	October		

=== Conversions and rebrandings ===
Old network name	New network name	Type	Conversion Date	Notes	Source
The Box Comedy	Comedy Central	Cable television	30 April		
Sci-Fi Channel	Syfy	Cable television	30 May		
Nicktoons on Nick	Nicktoons	Cable television	2 August		
Tien	RTL 8	Cable and satellite	17 August		

== See also ==
- 2007 in the Netherlands
