= Hopi Boys =

Hopi boys
- Founding location: Amsterdam
- Territory: The Netherlands
- Ethnicity: Predominantly Afro-Curaçaoan
- Criminal activities: Armed robbery, Drug trafficking, Prostitution, Murder
- Allies: Green gang
- Rivals: Kloekhorststraat Gang

The Hopi Boys are an Afro-Curaçaoan criminal group from the south-east region of Amsterdam. It is one of the most influential gangs in the Dutch capital. They control many criminal activities (racket, drug dealing, prostitution) in the Amsterdam region.

== See also ==
- Bijlmermeer
- Penose
