= Evert Hingst =

Dutch lawyer (1969–2005)

- Born: 22 March 1969; Utrecht, Netherlands
- Died: 31 October 2005 (aged 36); Amsterdam, Netherlands
- Occupation: Lawyer

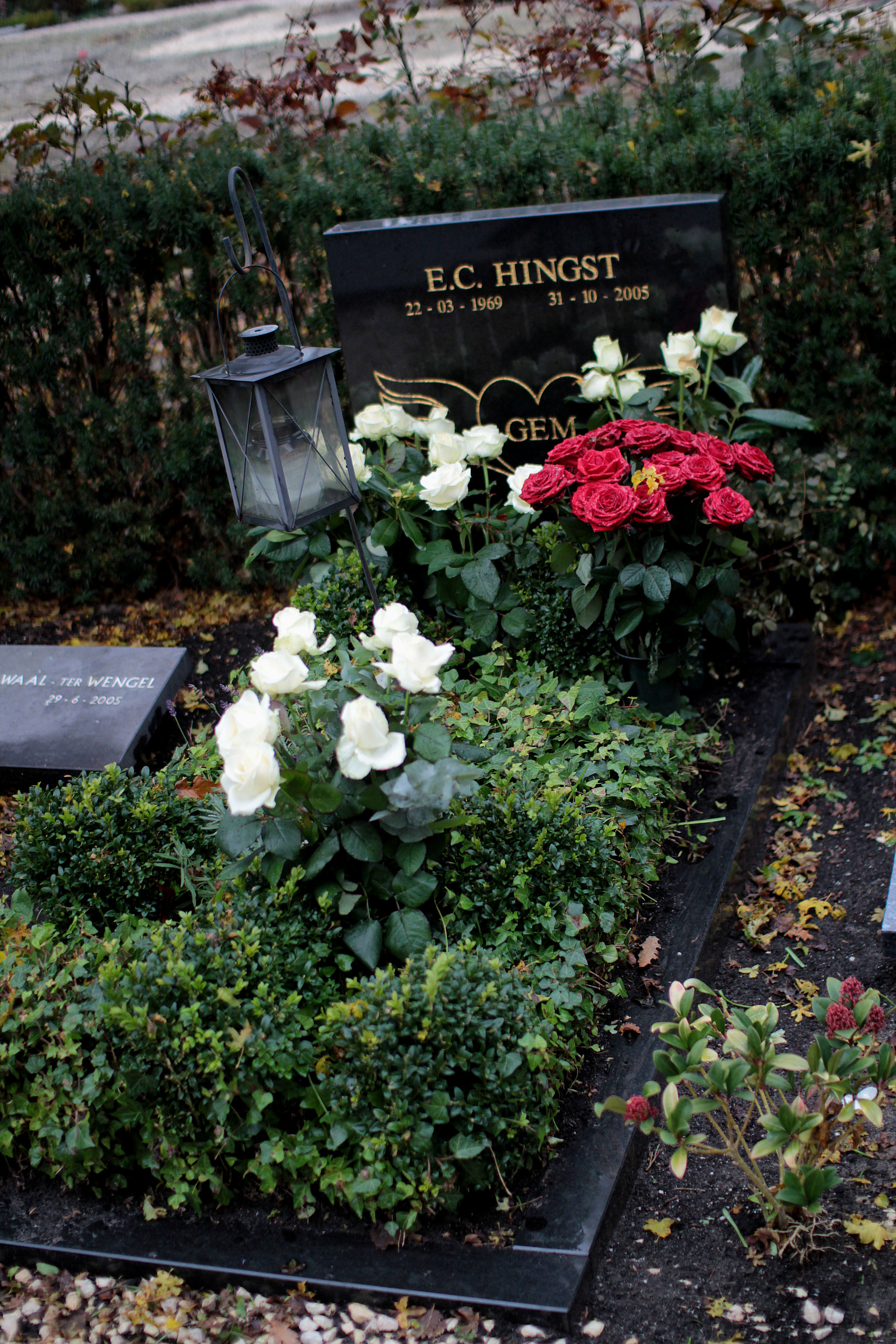
Zorgvlied cemetery, grave of Hingst

Evert Constantijn Hingst (22 March 1969 – 31 October 2005) was a Dutch lawyer. He was murdered in Amsterdam, one day before he was to talk to various media about the various investigations the Dutch Department of Justice was conducting after him.

Among Hingst's clients were many noted criminals, including Sam Klepper and John Mieremet, who was once shot in front of Hingst's office. After this assault, Mieremet had claimed that Hingst had tried to set him up and promised revenge. Hingst was gunned down on 31 October. His murder was one of several in a string of underworld killings during late October and early November 2005 and one in a longer series of assassinations that started in 2000. Mieremet was murdered two days later, on 2 November, in Thailand. Both he and Hingst were suspected of involvement in the extortion and subsequent murder of real estate magnate Willem Endstra.

Born in Utrecht, Hingst was imprisoned for several weeks when, during a raid of his office in 2005, the police discovered three firearms and a large sum of cash. A suspect of money laundering, membership of a criminal organization and possession of firearms, Hingst gave up his profession as a lawyer in July 2005. Hingst had previously been arrested on charges of forgery of documents in 2004.
