= Paul de Vries =

Paul de Vries may refer to:

- Paul de Vries (footballer), Ghanaian football player
- Paul de Vries (criminal), Dutch gangster
- Paul Vredeman de Vries, Flemish painter and draughtsman
