= Jeanne Henriquez =

Afro-Curaçaoan educator, historian, and activist

- Born: Jeanne Dionise Henriquez; 1946 (age 79–80); Otrobanda, Willemstad, Curaçao, Netherlands Antilles
- Occupations: educator, historian and women's rights activist
- Years active: 1976–2013

Jeanne Henriquez (born 1946) is an Afro-Curaçaoan educator, historian and activist. She published articles and made videos to explore the history and impact of colonialism on her Curaçao community. After teaching for over two decades, Henriquez became the director of the Center for the Protection of Women. She worked to alleviate domestic violence and provide educational and employment training for low-income women. She has worked with the Museum Tula to develop materials to reclaim the history of Afro-Curaçaoans and the African diaspora throughout the Caribbean. She was awarded the Cross of Merit from the Government of Curaçao for her activism for women and the Afro-Curaçaoan communities.

== Early life ==
Jeanne Dionise Henriquez was born in 1946 in the neighborhood of Otrobanda in Willemstad, Curaçao, which at the time was a part of the Netherlands Antilles, to Carmita Nicolasia (née Hernandez) and Plinio Miguel Henriquez. Her father was an analyst for the laboratory at Shell Oil Company and her mother was a dollmaker, whose designs celebrated the culture of Afro-Curaçaoans. Henriquez was the oldest daughter, having younger sisters Renee and Sarah. After completion of her secondary education, she began studying to be a teacher in 1962 in Curaçao. In 1967, she moved to Breda in the Netherlands, graduating from normal school in 1968. Continuing her schooling, Henriquez enrolled at the State University of Utrecht, studying socio-economic history. She obtained a master's degree and completed a PhD in 1976 evaluating the social and economic impact of the Atlantic slave trade on the history of Curaçao.

== Career ==
After completing her degree, Henriquez returned to Curaçao in 1976 and taught history at the Peter Stuyvesant College, now known as the Kolegio Alejandro Paula, Between 1979 and 1980, she left the school to work as the temporary head of the Central Historical Archives of the Netherlands Antilles. She returned to the high school in 1980 and in 1984, when she was appointed as dean. Simultaneously between 1984 and 1989, Henriquez taught at the Teacher’s Training School in Willemstad. Influenced by Joceline Clemencia, she wrote several articles during this time on the relationship of the island to the Kingdom of the Netherlands and worked with women living in poverty. She also had a son in 1982, Ray Asim Henriquez, and chose to raise him as a single mother. Henriquez worked on the editorial staff of the Historical Archives of the Netherlands Antilles’ bi-annual journal Lanternu from 1984 to 1987. In the 1980s, she worked as the co-editor for the script on a series of fifteen videos, which aimed to present a balanced assessment on the colonial and post-colonial history of Curaçao without the Eurocentric view upon which previous textbooks had focused. After the series was presented, the transcripts were published as books.

Henriquez was the head of Peter Stuyvesant College until 1988, when she moved to Washington, D. C. to pursue her master's degree. Taking her son with her to the United States, she enrolled in the women's studies program at George Washington University. While she was in school, she worked in a youth program providing educational materials and information on HIV/AIDS for young adults and then through 1991, worked as an intern in a rape crisis center in Washington. Graduating with a master of arts degree in women's studies in 1991, she returned to Curaçao as the director of the Center for the Promotion of Women (Papiamento: Sentro pa Desaroyo di Hende Muhé, SDHM), where she worked until 1998. At SDHM, Henriquez primarily worked with low-income women, providing training and materials written in Papiamento, the lingua franca of the Netherlands Antilles, on the prevention and crisis intervention for domestic violence. She also provided counseling on education and job opportunities.

During her tenure at SDHM, Henriquez published several works focused on women and their lives. Included were testimonies of single mothers in Curaçao (1990); a poem Appeal from a Mother (1992); video scripts regarding the lives of working women (1994); and biographies of six female prisoners (1996). In 1998, she left SDHM and headed the public relations for the National Archives of Curaçao. In that capacity, she staged an exhibit on one of Curaçao's pioneering feminists, Adèle Rigaud, in 1999 and expanded the program to then cover other influential feminists. In 2002, she led a cooperative conference with UNESCO on the African diaspora. The conference evaluated new methods to study slavery and its impact for the Caribbean.

Henriquez retired in 2004 and worked as an independent historical researcher and consultant for the study of Curaçaoan emancipation for two years, volunteering at organizations to combat violence against women. Between 2006 and 2010, Henriquez served at a board member of the Network for Women's Health in Latin America and the Caribbean (Spanish: Red de la Salud de Mujeres de Latin America y del Caribe (RSMLAC)) and simultaneously from 2009 worked as president of Dedima Foundation, an organization which protects the human rights of Curaçao’s women and children. Between 2005 and 2013, she served as project manager and coordinator of Museum Tula, a former plantation, which bears the name of Tula, who led the Curaçao Slave Revolt of 1795. The museum strives to exhibit materials focused on the socio-economic development of not only Afro-Curaçaoans but the broader Caribbean region. She worked on projects to collect oral history and published a manual on methodologies of oral history in 2013. That same year, she led a project to reconstruct a slave dwelling for the Museum of Afro-Curaçaoan Heritage and assisted with the establishment of the Slavery Heritage Knowledge Centre located at the museum.

Henriquez received the Foundation Cultural Bando Bou Award in 2013 for her work at Museum Tula and was the recipient of the Government of Curaçao’s Cross of Merit in 2015.
