= Bram Zeegers =

Dutch lawyer

Bram Zeegers (15 March 1949, in Amsterdam – 9 October 2007, in Amsterdam) was a Dutch lawyer. Zeegers was a key witness in the 2007 murder and extortion trial of suspected crime boss Willem Holleeder. Holleeder was on trial for the 17 May 2004 murder of Dutch real estate businessman Willem Endstra. Holleeder is also suspected of blackmailing several other businessmen.

Zeegers testified in court over two days that Holleeder and his associates had extorted millions of dollars from Endstra between 2000 and 2004. He also testified about the tense relationship between Holleeder and Endstra before the latter was shot and killed near his offices in Amsterdam on 17 May 2004. Holleeder had maintained that he and Endstra had an amicable relationship.

== Death ==
Zeegers was found dead in his Amsterdam apartment, less than one week after he had testified at Holleeder's trial. The sudden and unexpected death of Zeegers led to speculation that he may have been murdered and received much coverage in the Dutch media.

However, Zeegers was found to have died of an accidental overdose of the drug ecstasy. According to a story in the Dutch newspaper, Volkskrant, Zeegers was found to have ecstasy in his body that consisted of 97% pure MDMA, which is extremely high. The chances of dying from an MDMA overdose is around one in 100,000. Zeegers' Brazilian girlfriend, who bought the drugs, was held in connection with the case before being released, though she remains a suspect. Three suspects in all were arrested and held in connection with the production of the drug that killed Zeegers.

No connection between Zeegers' death and his testimony in the Willem Holleeder trial has so far been found. Zeegers' death is now widely regarded as an accidental overdose.

The trial resumed on 22 October 2007, after a recess to investigate Zeegers' death.

== Legacy ==
In March 2013, Neal Stevens of Subsim introduced the monthly Abraham award on the site, in memory of Zeegers, who had been a member of the site.
