= Roy Francis Adkins =

English gangster (1947–1990)

- Born: 4 October 1947; Hammersmith, London, England
- Died: 28 September 1990 (aged 42); Amsterdam, Netherlands
- Cause of death: Murder (shooting)
- Occupations: Gangster, drug trafficker

Roy Francis Adkins (4 October 1947 – 28 September 1990) was an English gangster. He was a recognised London gangland figure during the 1970s and 80s.

== Biography ==
Adkins started his career in robbery and, as with many criminal figures during that period, moved into drug smuggling, primarily cannabis. He had a reputation for a quick temper and for being very physically imposing and strong and was a feared figure for many years. During the 1980s he became partners with Klaas Bruinsma in the Netherlands and was allegedly appointed as head of the drugs division of Bruinsma's organisation. Adkins was implicated in April 1990 in the murder in Spain of former train robber Charles Wilson although this was never proven. Adkins was involved in a fight and shootout with Bruinsma in the famous Amsterdam night club/brothel Yab Yum and his refusal to submit or back down to Bruinsma is widely believed to have directly led to his murder.

== Death ==
On 28 September 1990, Adkins was seen with two Colombian men at the American Hotel in Amsterdam. According to Adkins' former accomplice, Sam O'Neil, Adkins had been smuggling stolen emeralds through the Netherlands for a group of Colombians. However, one shipment was stolen. O'Neil had seen Adkins in the American Hotel's Nightwatch bar, though Adkins had indicated O'Neil should move along. Some time later that evening, Adkins was shot dead. After his death, the Metropolitan Police seized £900,000 as suspected proceeds of crime. These assets were later released after an appeal from the legatees of the Will.

In 1993, police considered reopening the investigation into the killing of Adkins and Wilson due to the January 1993 assassination of British businessman Donald Urquhart in London.

== See also ==
- List of unsolved murders (1980–1999)
