= Willem van Boxtel =

Motorcycle gang leader in the Netherlands

Willem van Boxtel (born 18 August 1954), better known as "Big Willem", is a Dutch "rocker" (outlaw biker) and alleged gangster who founded the first Hells Angels chapter in the Netherlands.

== Rise to power ==
Boxtel was born into a working-class family on the east end of Amsterdam. An unruly youth who idolized Sonny Barger and the Hells Angels, he founded in 1973 a biker gang named the Kreidler Ploeg East. He celebrated his 18th birthday in 1974 by savagely beating the owner of a convenience store. When the manager called the police, leading to Boxtel being arrested for assault, Boxtel beat him up again.

In September 1974, Boxtel and his gang went on a rampage of mindless violence, raiding a high school where he and his gang beat up two school teachers along with a number of schoolboys and schoolgirls. When the husband of one the teachers whom he beat came to her aid, Boxtel and his gang beat him in turn and tossed him down the stairwell. Boxtel ended his rampage by going across the street to beat the owner of a snack bar and smashed his head so severely that he was hospitalized. Only the appearance of the Amsterdam police stopped him from engaging in further violence. Boxtel and 11 of his followers were convicted of assault and sentenced to six years in prison. Boxtel appealed his sentence, which was reduced to six weeks of probation later in 1974 on the account of his age.

At this point, Boxtel started to call his gang the "Hells Angels" though at this point he did not have permission from Barger to do so. When members of a British outlaw biker gang called the Mad Dogs visited Amsterdam, Boxtel and his followers beat them up in order to show that Amsterdam "belonged" to the Hells Angels. Despite or rather because of his violence, the city of Amsterdam gave Boxtel 172,500 guilders (the equivalent to $103,386 US dollars in 2006) to build a clubhouse for his gang in exchange for him not engaging in any more violence. The city also agreed to give Boxtel 21,300 guilders annually (the equivalent to $12,772 US dollars in 2006) to hold charity events and teach young people about motorcycle riding.

== Hells Angels ==
Boxtel's activities had attracted the attention of Barger who in 1977 gave Boxtel the status of a "prospect" with the Hells Angels, and finally gave his approval for Boxtel to use the Hells Angels name along with their death's head logo. Boxtel named his clubhouse the Angel Place. The city of Amsterdam only ended its annual grants to the Dutch Hells Angels in the 1980s when it was discovered that he used the money he was supposed to spend on charity on upgrading the Angel Place clubhouse instead. Boxtel was considered to be one of the rising stars of the Hells Angels in the 1970s, and a number of American, German, British, Austrian and Australian Hells Angels frequently visited Amsterdam to see him. Boxtel had the Dutch Hells Angels take control of the ports of Amsterdam and Rotterdam, which became key centers in the smuggling of drugs

In May 1978, Boxtel attracted much notoriety when a 19-year-old girl was gang-raped at the Angel Place. A group of outlaw bikers from Denmark had visited Amsterdam to inquire about joining the Hells Angels and the girl was offered as a sexual gift to the Danish bikers. When she refused their demands for sex, she was gang-raped. The gang-rape led to demands that the Angel Place be shut down. Boxtel told the Dutch media at the time: "We live by our laws; one of them being that apart from our girlfriends, girls are only permitted in the Angel Place for sex". Boxtel's statement which was widely seen as approval of the gang-rape led to demands from feminist groups that the city close the Angel Place. Boxtel then changed his approach, adopting the Toys for Tots strategy frequently used by the American Hells Angels as he donated generously to children's charities and provided free toys to needy children in a bid to change the image of his chapter. On 28 October 1978, two American Hells Angels from the Oakland chapter who arrived in Amsterdam gave Boxtel his "full patch" and declared him the president of a "full patch" Hells Angel chapter.

Boxtel soon expanded the Dutch Hells Angels, opening new chapters in Haarlem in 1980, another in Limburg in 1986, and another chapter in the north end of Amsterdam in 1990. Boxtel was also active abroad, playing key roles in opening new Hells Angels chapters in Denmark, Sweden, Norway, and Finland. He was especially close to Bent Svane Nielsen, the man who founded the Hells Angels Copenhagen chapter in 1980. Boxtel had the Hells Angels take over a number of brothels, restaurants, cafes and nightclubs in the Netherlands. The Canadian journalists Julian Sher and William Marsden wrote that Boxtel created "one of the most powerful underworld organizations in Europe". The police forces in Sweden, Norway and Denmark have long stated that Boxtel's Amsterdam chapter had the ultimate authority over all of the Hells Angels chapters in Scandinavia. One Hells Angels who turned informer claimed that Boxtel was in charge of all the Hells Angels operations in Europe. Boxtel's Amsterdam chapter became a key junction point in drug smuggling where cocaine from Colombia and cannabis from Morocco were smuggled into the rest of Europe while heroin from Turkey and Afghanistan was smuggled out to the British isles and the Americas.

Boxtel created a monopoly on organized crime in the Netherlands and was successful at keeping other biker gangs such as the Outlaws and the Bandidos from setting up any chapters in the Netherlands. During Boxtel's tenure as the Amsterdam chapter president, the Netherlands had no biker wars because there were no other biker gangs to challenge the Hells Angels. An Interpol report from 1989 stated that Boxtel was one of Europe's most powerful gangsters. Boxtel became a major figure in the social life of Amsterdam and took part in the retirement party for Amsterdam alderman Edgar Peer who served as the chairman of the city's finance committee. The port of Rotterdam is the largest port in Europe, and Boxtel's control of the port made him into a key player in the global underworld. By the year 2000, Boxtel had formed connections with organized crime groups in Italy, Belgium, Colombia, Nigeria, Serbia, Bosnia, Russia, Hungary, Spain, Turkey, China and Japan.

== Downfall ==
On 10 October 2000, a Hells Angels "prospect", Sam Klepper, was shot dead execution style on the streets of Amsterdam. The fact that Boxtel did not strike back caused his underworld reputation much harm. By this time, Boxtel spent most of his time at his estate in South Africa and he appeared anxious to avoid a gangland war. The Dutch police raided the Angel Place where they found a number of handguns and knives. In Boxtel's bungalow located behind the Angel Place, the police found a Ruger revolver and a Beretta pistol. He was charged with the illegal possession of guns, but he had the guns returned to him when he showed that he had valid permits for both weapons. Despite his fear of an underworld war, a gangland war took place in Amsterdam with 9 crime bosses being killed between 2002 and 2004.

On 6 February 2002, a Dutch underworld figure, John Mieremet, was badly wounded when he was shot in the stomach during a failed murder attempt. Mieremet had once been the business partner of Klepper where the duo were known as "Spic and Span". Mieremet fled into Belgium, where he gave a press conference where he accused Willem Holleeder and Willem Endstra as being behind the murder attempt. Holleeder was an underworld boss who had been behind the kidnapping of Freddy Heineken, the owner of the Heineken beer brewing company in 1983. Holleeder had been released from prison in 1990, and was known to have close ties to the Hells Angels. Endstra was a scion of one of the richest families in the Netherlands with extensive investments in railroads, banking and real estate. Mieremet called Endstra "the banker to the underworld" as he accused him of money laundering and Holleeder the "guardian to the vault". Miermet claimed that Endstra had cheated him on a 22 million euro money laundering scheme, and hired Holleeder to kill him when he threatened to kill Endstra. Mieremet's press conference confirmed long-standing suspicions that Endstra had been engaged in money laundering, an allegation that had first been made in 1992. It also led to Endstra's allies such as Holleeder to grow suspicious of him and led to concerns that he was cheating them as well.

In January 2003, the Dutch police with co-operation from the American Federal Bureau of Investigation (FBI) and the Canadian Royal Canadian Mounted Police (RCMP) started an investigation into the Dutch Hells Angels named Project Acronym. There had been close links between the Dutch Hells Angels and the Canadian Hells Angels, and Boxtel was accused by the RCMP of being one of the largest smugglers of drugs into Canada. As part of Project Acronym, the police bugged Boxtel's phones and offices. According to police wiretaps, Endstra offered Boxtel one million euros in exchange for him having Holleeder killed. A problem for Boxtel was that the secretary of the Amsterdam chapter, Harrie Stoeltie, was a friend of Holleeder and was opposed to having him killed. Stoelite worked as the "head of security" at the Yab Yum brothel, the most expensive and exclusive brothel in the Netherlands. Stoeltie was the leader of a clique within the Hells Angels known as t Setje ("the Bunch") that embraced a number of Hells Angels from the chapters in the United Kingdom, the Netherlands and Scandinavia. Besides for Stoeltie, the most important member of t Setje was Paul "The Butcher" de Vries, the president of the elite Nomad chapter based in Limburg.

One of Boxtel's lieutenants, de Vries, had violated the Angels' rules against drug rip-offs a number of times. De Vries murdered another drug dealer, Steven Chocolaad, to hide the fact that he had stolen 300 kilograms of cocaine from a Colombian drug cartel. On 10 February 2004, a Hells Angel, Peter Schumans, was alleged by the police to have asked Boxtel for permission to kill de Vries before the Colombians did. On 11 February 2004, de Vries, his bodyguard Cor Pijnenburg and his friend Serge "Moon" Wagener attended a Hells Angels meeting in the village of Oirsbeek where they were all lined up against a wall and shot.

The bodies of de Vries, Pijnenburg and Wagner were buried in shallow graves near the Juliana channel in order that they be discovered and to let the Colombians know that the Hells Angels could be trusted to deal with their own. A police bug recorded the killers telling Boxtel that the job he had assigned them was done. On 13 February 2004, the bodies were discovered. At the trial of the killers in June 2004, a drug dealer, Angelo Diaz, testified that Boxtel had ordered the murders of de Vries, Pijnenburg and Wagner. The allegation that Boxtel had ordered the murders of his fellow biker "brothers" did much damage to Boxtel's reputation within the Hells Angels and starting in 2004 he was rarely seen in public. On 17 May 2004, Endstra was murdered. The Dutch police arrested Boxtel who admitted that Enstra had hired him to "punish" Holleeder, but he denied any intention to kill him.

In September 2004, Boxtel was expelled from the Hells Angels. The reason given in an unusual press conference was that Boxtel had been alleged to have confessed that he had accepted money from Endstra to kill Holleeder, which led for him being expelled. The man who engineered Boxtel's expulsion was Harrie Stoeltie, who became the de facto president of the Amsterdam chapter. Stoeltie is said to have used the Enstra affair as an excuse to have Boxtel expelled. On 17 October 2005, Boxtel was arrested and charged with assault, extortion, gun-running, money laundering, and drug trafficking. In 2013, Boxtel founded a new biker gang, the No Surrender Motorcycle Club, as president. In August 2013, Boxtel made peace with the Satudarah club. On 28 April 2022, Boxtel was acquitted on the money laundering charges.

== Books ==
- Sher, Julian; Marsden, William (2006). Angels of Death: Inside the Bikers' Empire of Crime. Toronto: Alfred Knopf Canada. ISBN 9780307370327.
