= Cape Verdean organized crime =

Cape Verdean Organized Crime
- Founding location: Cape Verde
- Territory: France, Netherlands, Portugal, Switzerland, United States: New England
- Ethnicity: Cape Verdean
- Criminal activities: Drug trafficking, Weapon trafficking, Prostitution, Contract killing, Extortion, Racketeering, Money laundering, Illegal, unreported and unregulated fishing, Piracy, Blood diamond smuggling

Cape Verdean organized crime refers to the various criminal organizations that are active in Cape Verde and Cape Verdean diaspora communities. Cape Verde is important as a transshipment point in the cocaine trade, and the existence of sizeable Cape Verdean communities in New England, the Dutch port city of Rotterdam as well as in several cities in Portugal, France and Switzerland, led to the formation of criminal gangs in the community active in the international drug trade supplemented with other criminal activities. Cape Verdean organized crime primarily comes in the form of street gangs, with varying levels of organization and sophistication.

== Cape Verde as a drug transshipment point ==
West Africa has been affected by a range of illicit maritime activities, such as human trafficking, the smuggling of small arms and narcotics, illegal fishing and piracy. In an increasingly interconnected world the rise in these activities in the region does not solely represent a challenge to security and stability. In fact, it has profound implications for the international community, namely the EU and the US. Those activities, drug trafficking in particular, are a major source of income for drug cartels based in Latin America. Following the importance of Nigeria, and the creation of internationally active Nigerian organized crime, mainly Colombian criminal organizations began looking for further transshipment points attractive for drug trafficking activities. The next West African countries used as drug trafficking points were Guinea-Bissau and Cape Verde, of which the latter had the bigger international diaspora community.

While Guinea-Bissau as a transshipment point between South America, Africa and Europe in itself is just as important, the more widespread recognition of the activities of Cape Verdean criminals is in part due to the latter's larger overseas communities. American and European criminals of Cape Verdean origin deported back to their home country have in several instances become involved in drug smuggling activities on the islands. This in turn has made it possible for them to become middlemen between the South American drug cartels and the Cape Verdean criminals within the overseas communities.

== International activity ==
Several areas with a Cape Verdean community are home to local neighborhood-based street gangs or cliques. Some of those street gangs, due to family or community ties, have connections to drug smugglers based on the islands of Cape Verde itself, making it possible for them to import narcotics, especially cocaine, into the respective countries they live in.

=== Belgium ===
Cape Verdean gangs are active in the southeast of Belgium, namely in the province of Luxembourg. A well-known power base is the town of Athus, where they conduct criminal activities such drug trafficking as well as prostitution.

=== France ===
Cape Verdean communities exist in several Parisian suburbs. Some of them are home to their own local gangs. Several of the gangs are active in the large-scale importation, as well as the wholesale and retail distribution of narcotics, as was the case with the infamous French-Cape Verdean crime boss named Arleto.

=== Netherlands ===
In the Netherlands, Cape Verdeans have the biggest presence in the port city of Rotterdam. While the Dutch Cape Verdean community has a generally lesser street gang problem, some Cape Verdean criminals are active alongside established Dutch Antillean criminal organizations. Their criminal activities mostly concern large narcotics importations, local drug distribution, money laundering and murder. Local gangs are also active in the extortion of alleged drug smugglers. A notable case led to the so-called Rotterdam cafe killings in 2005 when several people, including innocents, were killed by three local Cape Verdean career criminals. It was alleged that the motive was a dispute between the three killers and the owner of the bar over drugs and an unsanctioned murder back in Cape Verde.

=== Portugal ===
Cape Verdean gangs are one of the most important sources of drugs in Portugal. The notorious Lisbon neighborhood Cova da Moura, with a large Cape Verdean community, is a known stage for local rival criminal organizations battling over the drug trade and illegal rackets in the city.

=== Switzerland ===
The small Swiss city of Martigny is home to two main criminal organizations, one Albanian mafia gang and another gang composed of persons of Cape Verdean descent, which have traditionally rivaled each other over the monopoly in trafficking of narcotics and other criminal activities in the country's Valais region. This has occasionally led to shootings and murders between the two parties.

=== United States ===
==== New England ====
The New England region in the United States, especially the cities of Boston and Brockton in Massachusetts and the Rhode Island state, is home to a sizeable Cape Verdean community. Several of the region's neighborhoods are home to street gangs. While larger and more structured gangs exist, a notable example is the gang named Cape Verdean Outlaws, the vast majority of the Cape Verdean street gangs are based and named after their respective neighborhoods such as the Hendry Street Gang and the Woodward Avenue Gang. These gangs sometimes cooperate, but also often rival with each other leading to murder and violent clashes over turf.

The level of organization and sophistication is varying, with several gangs seldom extending beyond local crimes and drug dealing, while some others are involved in large-scale drug trafficking enterprises, as well as extortion, money laundering and strong-arm jobs for locally active American Mafia crews.

A smaller Cape Verdean community had emerged in central North Carolina in the mid-2000s where the youngest of the Faial family currently resides. This gang or family brokers many of the deals between gangs and potentially has the largest outreach from racketeering to strong arm jobs to significant political influence.

== See also ==
- Crime in Cape Verde
