= Joceline Clemencia =

Curaçaoan writer (1952–2011)

- 2010
- Born: Joceline Andrea Clemencia; 30 November 1952; Curaçao
- Died: 30 May 2011 (aged 58); Willemstad, Curaçao
- Other names: Joceline Clemencia-Kirindongo, Joceline Clemencia-Quirindongo
- Years active: 1980–2009
- Known for: advocate for recognition of Papiamento as an official language

Joceline Clemencia (30 November 1952 – 30 May 2011) was an Afro-Curaçaoan writer, linguist, feminist and independence activist. She advocated for the Creole language spoken in Curaçao, Papiamento, to become an official language and was successful in the struggle, having created both language schools and texts to further its cultural significance. She was in favor of full independence of Curaçao from the Netherlands.

== Early life ==
Joceline Andrea Clemencia was born on 30 November 1952 in Curaçao. She completed her higher education in Amsterdam, earning a doctorate degree in Spanish and Spanish literature from the University of Amsterdam. During her student days, she became involved in several activist movements including worldwide protests against the Vietnam War and the independence movements of the Netherlands Antilles.

== Career ==
"Translate is what we Antilleans have had to do constantly. Read and write in a foreign language ... Live in two worlds connected by a bridge. Is this some sort of cultural synthesis? Think in one language and have feeling in your own language?"

In the early 1980s, Clemencia returned to Curaçao and began working as a Spanish teacher at the Peter Stuyvesant College, now the Kolegio Alejandro Paula, in Willemstad, Curaçao. A large part of her activism centered on the Papiamento language and its suppression. By the early 1990s, she was serving as director of the Instituto di Nashonal Sede di Papiamentu (National Institute of the Papiamento Language) to promote usage and teaching of the native language of Aruba, Bonaire and Curaçao. Because Papiamento has roots in the slave trade, there was little public support in preserving the language or teaching it in the Dutch school system. She advocated for the language to be standardized and taught, as it was the mother-tongue of the country. In a report prepared for UNESCO, Clemencia argued that Papiamentu and English should be declared the national languages of the Antilles.

Clemencia also served as a supervisor in the Government Bureau of Linguistics. She founded and became the director of the Instituto Kultural Independensha (Institute of Cultural Independence) in 1996 with the goal of teaching Papiamento. She also founded the Skol Nobo (New School) to teach cultural history, including, art, sport, and nature studies which were not included in other school curricula. Clemencia co-wrote with Omayra Leeflang a text for teaching Papiamento entitled Papiamentu Funshonal, which became a standard for secondary education instruction. Her efforts at recognition of Papiamentu as an official language were finally successful in 2007, when the government accepted it as one of the official languages, along with Dutch and English.

Through her study of language, Clemencia wrote about women and their relationships to language and communication. The terms and customs that women used among themselves to give messages about themselves were one of the themes she often wrote about. As a member of the Caribbean Association of Women and Scholars (ACWWS), Clemencia participated in conferences and meetings to promote a feminist identity which recognized the diversity of women from the Caribbean and allow their contributions to be told in their own voice, be that Dutch, English, French, Spanish or Creole languages, as the language used defines an identity strategy for the writer. Though an ardent feminist, Clemencia believed that general emancipation, including identity, independence and language, were critical elements in attaining political freedom.

During the early years of the 21st century, facing high unemployment and social unrest in Curaçao, Clemencia joined with other intellectuals and in 2006 formed the Grupo Pro Defensa di Kòrsou (Group in Favor of the Defense of Curaçao) and a political party called Partido Indepensha (Independence Party). She was the party chair and campaigned vigorously for independence from The Netherlands. Though she combined her party's influence with Anthony Godett's Party Workers' Liberation Front 30 May, they were defeated and the final results of the referendum was not full independence. Curaçao became an autonomous country within the Kingdom of the Netherlands, dependent on the kingdom for defense and foreign policy decisions. Shortly after the results, Clemencia withdrew from politics because of her private battle with breast cancer.

== Personal ==
Clemencia was married to Frank Kirindongo (also known as Frank Quirindongo), with whom she had three children before their divorce. She died on 30 May 2011 in Willemstad after a two-year battle with breast cancer.

== Selected works ==
- Clemencia, Joceline (1987). "Papiamentu in het Curaçaos basisonderwijs". Hacha: Maandelijks Informatiebulletin voor Antillianen in Utrecht E.o Hacha (in Portuguese). 13 (1): 40–42. OCLC 773341355.
- Clemencia, Joceline (1987). "Perspektiva di morto den poesia di Elis Juliana". Plataforma: Kwartaalblad van Plataforma di Organisashonnan Antiano Plataforma (in Papiamento). 4 (4): 15–17. OCLC 773345744.
- Clemencia, Joceline (1987). "Een gewaad van Europese magie over het harnas van Afrikaanse magie: enkele aspecten van religiositeit in de poëzie van Elis Juliana". Plataforma: Kwartaalblad van Plataforma di Organisashonnan Antiano Plataforma (in Dutch). 4 (1): 20–26. OCLC 773342218.
- Clemencia, Joceline A. (1989). Het grote camouflagespel van de OPI : een thematische benadering van de poëzie van Elis Juliana (in Dutch) (Antillen working papers #14 ed.). Leiden, Netherlands: Caraïbische Afd., Koninklijk Instituut voor Taal-, Land- en Volkenkunde. ISBN 978-90-6718-017-7.
- Clemencia, Joseline (1989). OPI i e gran kamuflahe: tokante poesia (in Papiamento). Kòrsou, Curaçao: Sede di Papiamentu. ISBN 978-99904-2-701-1.
- Clemencia, Joceline (1992). "The semiotics of dark clouds in songs and poems of Elia Isenia: art as female therapy". In Ansano, Richenel (ed.). Mundu yama sinta mira: womanhood in Curaçao. Curaçao: Fundashon Publikashon. pp. 207–231. ISBN 99904-0-028-8.
- Clemencia, Joseline (1993). "Crime du fin de siècle: de eeuwige vernieuwingsintenties voor het Curaçaosche basisonderwijs". Black Flash (in Dutch). 3 (4). Saskatoon, Saskatchewan, Canada: 22–28. OCLC 773345722.
- Clemencia, Joseline (September–October 1994). "Suriname en het Caribisch gebied". Surplus (in Dutch). 8 (5): 2–19. OCLC 775405922.
- Clemencia, Joseline (April 1996). "Women who love women in Curaçao:from "Cachapera" to open throats: a commentary in collage". Feminist Studies. 22 (1): 81–88. doi:10.2307/3178247. hdl:2027/spo.0499697.0022.105. ISSN 0046-3663. JSTOR 3178247. OCLC 936756310.
- Clemencia, Joceline (1999). Language is more than language in the development of Curac̦ao (PDF). Kingston, Jamaica: Office of the UNESCO Representative in the Caribbean. ISBN 978-976-95037-5-5.
- Clemencia, Joceline (2001). "'Katibu ta galiña': from hidden to open protest in Curaçao". In Arnold, A. James; Arnold, Josephine V.; Houston, Natalie M.; Rolfes, Irene (eds.). English- and Dutch-speaking regions. Amsterdam: J. Benjamins. ISBN 90-272-3448-5.
