= Endy Opoku Bernadina =

Dutch footballer

Endy Bernadina
Personal information
- Full name: Endy Opoku Bernadina
- Date of birth: 3 May 1995 (age 31)
- Place of birth: Boxtel, Netherlands
- Height: 1.80 m (5 ft 11 in)
- Position: Striker

Youth career
- 2005–2012: PSV

Senior career*
Years	Team	Apps	(Gls)
2014–2015	RKC	16	(1)
2015–2016	Dukla Banská Bystrica	10	(7)
2016–2018	Železiarne Podbrezová	78	(12)
2019–2020	Opava	12	(2)
2020–2021	K. Rupel Boom F.C.		
2023–2024	RSD Jette		
- * Club domestic league appearances and goals as of 25 November 2025

Endy Opoku Bernadina (3 May 1995) is a Dutch footballer who is currently a free agent. He is most known for playing as a striker for SFC Opava.

== Club career ==
Bernadina was a youth player at the PSV Eindhoven academy, and in the men's category he made his mark in the RKC Waalwijk jersey, for which he played 16 games in the second highest Dutch league and scored one goal.

=== Podbrezová ===
In the summer of 2016, it was announced that Bernadina would be joining Slovak club FK Železiarne Podbrezová. He made his debut for the club in a 1–1 draw against Spartak Trnava. He scored his first goal for the club in a 2–0 away win against Tatran Presov in 2016. In his first season with Podbrezová, Bernadina scored 7 goals in 32 appearances. In his next season he would score 4 goals in 30 games.

He played 78 league matches for Podbrezová, scoring 12 goals altogether before transferring to SFC Opava.

=== Opava ===
On 15 January 2019, it was announced that Bernadina would be joining Czech side SFC Opava. He scored his first goal in a 2–1 win against FK Pardubice, scoring in the 90th minute to secure the win for his side. In his time with Opava, Bernadina would play 12 games, scoring in 2 of them.

=== Rupel Boom ===
On 24 August 2020, it was announced that Bernadina had signed to a one-year contract with Belgium amateur club K. Rupel Boom F.C.

== Personal life ==
Bernadina was born to an Afro-Curaçaoan father and a Ghanaian mother.
