= Yab Yum (brothel) =

Former high-end brothel in Amsterdam

Coordinates: 52°22′14.45″N 4°53′19″E

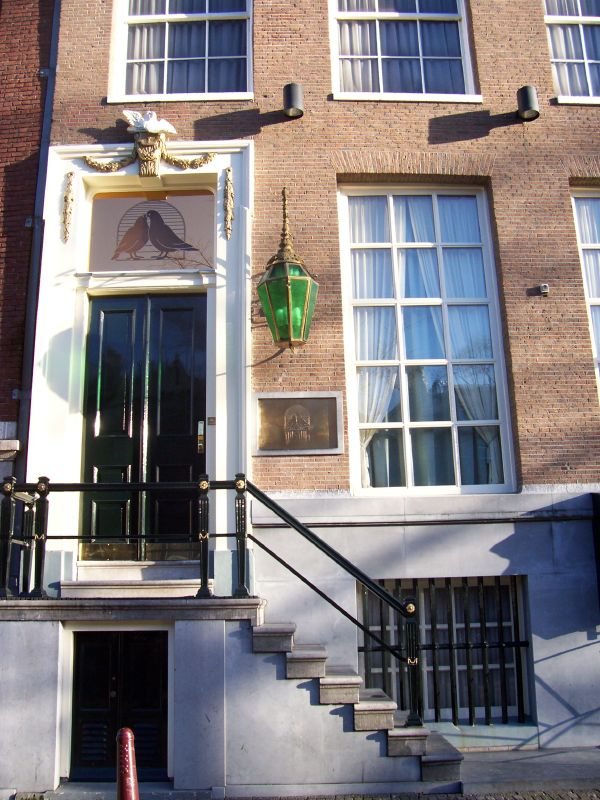
Entrance to Yab Yum brothel, Singel 295, Amsterdam. December 2005

Yab Yum was one of the best-known and most exclusive brothels in Amsterdam, the Netherlands. Located in a 17th-century canal house on the Singel, it mostly catered to businessmen and foreign visitors. A second Yab Yum operated for a while in Rotterdam, but has since been closed.

In January 2008, the city of Amsterdam closed the brothel by revoking its licence, alleging that it was being used for criminal activity.

== Operation ==
In 2005, the entrance fee was 70 euros, which included a drink. Sex for one hour cost 300 euros, but typically also required the purchase of an expensive bottle of champagne.

From its beginning in the 1980s until the legalisation of brothels in 2000, the Yab Yum operated as a "licensed club with no members" and was tolerated according to police guidelines, as long as no drugs and no violence were involved. The club advertised in student newspapers to find employees.

In 1997, it was reported that a woman earned up to $10,000 per month working at Yab Yum, tax free. Anticipating stricter regulation, the club agreed to pay taxes for its 55 employees starting 1 January 1998.

In anticipation of the official legalisation of brothels on 1 October 2000, Yab Yum owner Theo Heuft applied to open a "relax service" at the Amsterdam Schiphol Airport, to offer exclusive food, drink and massages to travellers. When he was turned down, he filed a lawsuit. The airport brothel was never opened.

In an interview in Millionair Magazine in February 2008, Heuft said that the brothel made its best ever earnings, just over 40,000 euros, on the evening in 1985 when the Dutch football team beat Cyprus 7–1 in Amsterdam. He complained about the "dreadful" atmosphere caused by the "ordinary clientele" that night.

== Ownership and scandals ==
The club has repeatedly been mentioned in connection with corruption affairs. In 1998 it was alleged that a director of a brokerage house regularly obtained insider information by inviting senior executives to Yab Yum. In 2002 a former manager of a building company alleged that civil servants were commonly bribed with visits to Yab Yum.

In 1990, drug trafficker Klaas Bruinsma and his associate Roy Adkins fought in the club after one of their operations had gone sour; shots were fired but nobody was injured and nobody talked to the police. Adkins was assassinated later that year and Bruinsma was shot to death in 1991.

A newspaper article in 2006 reported that true ownership of the brothel had long been in the hands of mafia figures, beginning with Klaas Bruinsma, who called it "the club house". After Bruinsma's death, his associates Sam Klepper and John Mieremet took over, along with the Dutch Hells Angels. Klepper was murdered in 2000; Mieremet survived an assassination attempt in 2002 but was murdered in 2005. Harrie Stoeltie, the secretary of the Hells Angels' Amsterdam chapter, worked as the "head of security" at Yab Yum.

== Closure ==
In November 2007 it was reported that the city of Amsterdam was trying to close the brothel by revoking its licence, alleging without going into details that it was being used for criminal activity. This was part of a larger campaign of mayor Job Cohen to reduce the number of sex businesses operating in the city center. Closure was done with the Bibob act which does not require proof of criminal activities or criminal connections: reasonably strong indications are sufficient.

Yab Yum appealed the revocation of the licence. At court, the city's lawyer alleged that owner Hennie Vittali was a front man for the Hells Angels, who had taken over the club in 1999 following blackmail and threats, buying it for €1.8m although the market price was put at €9m. On 4 January 2008 the court confirmed the action of the city. In a public statement, the brothel denied any connection with the Hells Angels and vowed to appeal the ruling. The brothel closed on 7 January 2008. On 15 January 2008 a higher court confirmed the decision; Yab Yum lost its licence and remained closed.

On 3 April 2010 an offer was announced; sex club owner Hennie Vittali was asking €6m for the name and property.

== Yab Yum Unlocked, the Yab Yum Museum ==
The Yab Yum building was bought for 3 million euros and the brand for 1 million euro by entrepreneur Chris Kraijpoel. In 2011 he applied for a new licence to reopen the brothel.

In September 2013, the original Yab Yum was reopened as a museum for the public. For €17.50 visitors could take a 20–40 minute tour that included the reception desk, the corridors through the complex, the bar where guests met the girls, all the rooms with the original beds and spas, the caviar club, the Champagne closets, the changing rooms for the girls, and the medical room. At the beginning of 2016 media reported that because of financial troubles the museum had closed down.

== Name ==
"Yab-Yum" is Tibetan for "father-mother" and describes a symbol in Buddhist and Hinduist art showing a male and female god in sexual union.

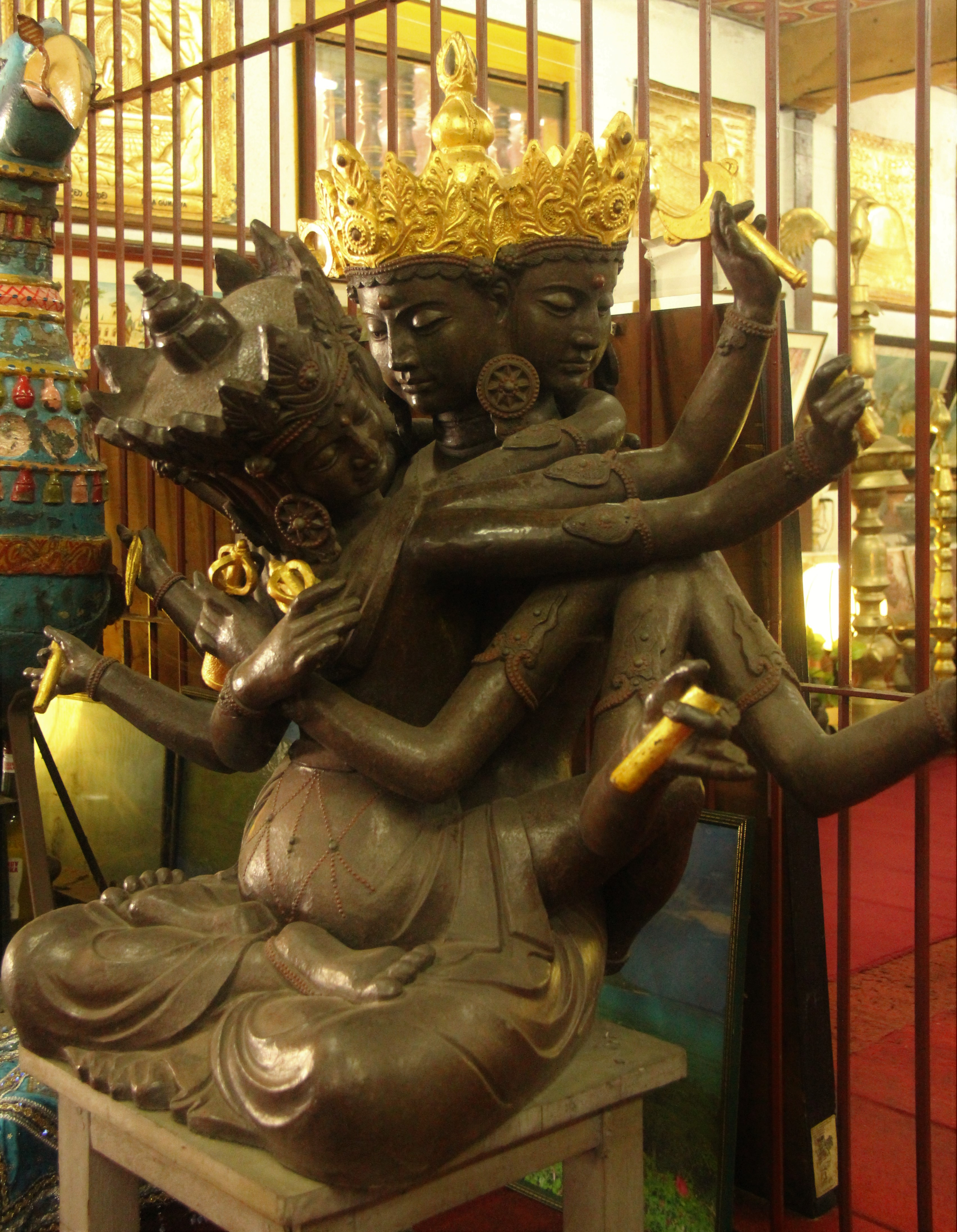
Heruka in Yab-Yum form. On display at Gangaramaya Temple museum.

== See also ==
- Prostitution in the Netherlands

== Books ==
- Sher, Julian; Marsden, William (2006). Angels of Death: Inside the Bikers' Empire of Crime. Toronto: Alfred Knopf Canada. ISBN 9780307370327.
