= Chinese Radio and TV =

Chinese Radio and Television (CRTV) is an organization created to bring Chinese language programming to the Netherlands and is operated by a group of enthusiastic volunteers. CRTV started with a biweekly one-hour radio program and has developed into one of the biggest cross-media platforms in Europe. CRTV offers a wide range of programs and activities: radio, television, a website, events, and editorship. CRTV offers programming in three languages: Cantonese, Mandarin and Dutch.

The audiences of CRTV programs include Chinese immigrants from mainland China and Hong Kong, the next generation of Dutch-born Chinese, students from China, and Dutch people interested in Chinese culture.

== History ==
CRTV was founded by a group of young Chinese graduates in May 1996. They started initially with a one-hour radio program called Chinese Radio Amsterdam (CRA) broadcast every other week through cable. The idea was to present a radio program in Chinese to inform the Chinese community about social, cultural and political issues.

=== Development ===
Today, the audience can listen to one-hour radio programs on cable, on air and on the Internet every Sunday till Friday. The subjects of the programs include news (local, national and China), education (health, legislations, finance), discussions, entertainment (show business, films, quizzes, sports), interviews, language courses, and reports, interluded by modern and classic Chinese music.

CRTV offers also television programs in Amsterdam, Rotterdam and The Hague every last Sunday. CRTV issues its own magazine and organizes talk shows about Chinese culture and society. Chinese Radio and Television cooperates with Dutch and Chinese organizations to make programs and to get or to give support. Recent examples are co-organization of the Amsterdam China Festival, promotion of Chinese films, and interviews with Chinese performers.

Chinese Radio and Television has become a communication platform between the different generations of Chinese people and between the Chinese community and Dutch society.

== Broadcasts ==
=== Radio ===
- Live in Amsterdam at FM 99.4 on air and at FM 104.6 on cable, every day except Saturday from 21:00 till 22:00 (Monday till 23:00)
- In The Hague at FM 106.8 on cable every Monday from 22:00 till 23:00

	Topic	Language	Content
Monday	CRTV Info 城市之聲資訊站	Cantonese	News and information for first generation Chinese people; activities and Dutch language lessons.
Tuesday	CRTV Culture 城市之声文化馆	Mandarin	Chinese culture in-depth discussion, Chinese artist interviews, Chinese music introduction
Wednesday	CRTV Showbiz 城市之聲娛樂場	Cantonese	Show business talk and entertainment news from Hong Kong, China, Netherlands and Hollywood; a quiz.
Thursday	CRTV Society 城市之声社会篇	Mandarin	Subjects related to living in the Netherlands. Every last Thursday of the month features law issues.
Friday	CRTV News 城市之聲新聞台	Cantonese	News and health information for first generation Chinese people
Sunday	CRTV Infotainment 城市之聲	Dutch	News from China; agenda with activities related to China and interviews; hot topics.

=== Television ===
CRTV started its own TV program in October 2007, with broadcasts in Amsterdam, Rotterdam and The Hague every Sunday. The program mainly reports events and interviews of Chinese related activities in The Netherlands and Belgium.
