= Geassocieerde Pers Diensten =

The Geassocieerde Pers Diensten (GPD) was a Netherlands based news agency.

The predecessor of the GPD, the Gemeenschappelijke Persdienst was formed in 1936 when the directors of several regional newspapers collaborated and formed their own news agency. In this way they thought they would be able to compete with the national media. The GPD was formed in 1994 from a merger of the Stichting Pers Unie with the Gemeenschappelijke Persdienst.

The GPD ceased to operate on 1 January 2013 when it lost its contract to supply news with the Wegener media company, a producer of mainly regional newspapers.
