= Patricia Remak =

Dutch politician

Member of the Provincial Council of North Holland
- In office 20 March 2003 – 9 January 2007

Member of the House of Representatives
- In office 19 May 1998 – 23 May 2002

Ward Alderman of Amsterdam-Zuidoost
- In office 17 June 1997 – April 1998

Member of the municipal council of Amsterdam-Zuidoost
- In office 1997 – April 1998
- In office 1994–1995

Personal details
- Born: Patricia Joan Boerenstam; July 16, 1965 (age 60) Amsterdam, Netherlands
- Party: Labour Party (until 1987); People's Party for Freedom and Democracy (1993–2005); Independent (since 2005)
- Spouse: Married

Patricia Joan Remak-Boerenstam (born 16 July 1965) is a former Dutch civil servant and politician of Surinamese descent. As a member of the People's Party for Freedom and Democracy (VVD) she was a Ward Alderman (stadsdeelwethouder) of the ward (stadsdeel) Amsterdam-Zuidoost from 1997 to 1998, a member of the House of Representatives from 1998 to 2002 and a member of the Provincial Council of North Holland from 2003 to 2007 (from 2005 as an independent). In 2008 she was convicted of fraud.

== Career ==
Remak studied tax law at Leiden University. Before she became an MP, she was a ward alderman in the ward Amsterdam-Zuidoost. Her portfolio contained welfare, sport and finances. In the House of Representatives, her portfolio included finances (taxes), development aid and state expenditure. After she left the House of Representatives, Remak joined the VVD group in the Provincial Council of North Holland in 2003. In June 2005 she left the VVD group, after major political differences' and continued as an independent member of the Provincial Council.

== Fraud ==
Remak was convicted of benefit fraud in January 2007. She received benefits (wachtgeld) from her former job as MP, although she was not entitled to do so since she had a substantial income from her work as a member of Provincial Council and tax inspector. She failed to inform the UWV (the government body responsible for benefits) about her income, as is required by law. Some days before this conviction became public, she resigned as a member of Provincial Council. Remak was first convicted to one year imprisonment (three months on probation). She appealed the ruling. One year later, the Amsterdam court convicted Remak to six months imprisonment (three months on probation) and 240 hours of community service in January 2008.

The province of North Holland launched an investigation into her period as a member of the Provincial Council and filed a complaint for fraud and forgery. These allegations were connected to payments of almost 28,000 euro to a party assistant who also worked for her husband's company.

=== Wikipedia ===
In June 2008 Remak demanded that the Dutch-language version of Wikipedia (and the blog GeenStijl.nl) remove the information on her conviction for fraud. She based her demand on Dutch privacy law. Wikipedia initially complied with her wishes; the information was restored in June 2008 on legal advice.
