= Jade Kops =

Dutch social media influencer and cancer activist (2007–2026)

- Born: 10 February 2007 's-Gravenzande, Netherlands
- Died: 24 April 2026 (aged 19) 's-Gravenzande, Netherlands
- Cause of death: Rhabdomyosarcoma
- Occupations: Social media influencer, book author
- Known for: Instagram account (@mijnlevenmetkanker_), Dedication to children with cancer
- Website: www.stichtingjade.nl

Jade Kops (Dutch: [ˈjaːdə ˈkɔps]; 10 February 2007 – 24 April 2026) was a Dutch social media influencer and author. She gained national recognition for her openness about her battle with rhabdomyosarcoma, a rare form of cancer, and her commitment to supporting others facing similar challenges. Through social media and social initiatives, she raised awareness of the impact of cancer on children and their families.

In 2024, Kops received a royal honour for her social commitment.

== Biography ==
Jade Kops was from 's-Gravenzande, a town in the municipality of Westland. She started dancing at the age of five and was a teaching assistant by the time she was fourteen.

=== Cancer diagnosis and treatment ===
At the age of 14, Kops began to speak unclearly and snore. After a few weeks, on 2 July 2021, she visited a medical professional, and she was told about a swelling in her throat and was referred to the Reinier de Graaf Gasthuis the same day. On 5 July, at a hospital in Rotterdam, cancer was suspected. Kops was referred to the Princess Máxima Centre in Utrecht and diagnosed with rhabdomyosarcoma in the neck region. The tumour extended from her throat to her ear. In the years that followed, she underwent an intensive course of treatment involving chemotherapy, radiation therapy and surgery.

After about a year and a half of treatment, the disease initially appeared to be under control, but shortly afterwards a scan revealed that the tumour had returned. In 2024, Kops was told that a cure was no longer possible. In December 2025, she announced that she was stopping further treatment due to high risks and uncertain chances of improvement, and stated that she wanted to focus on her quality of life.

At the end of February, Kops revealed that an MRI scan had shown the tumour had spread to almost the entire left side of her face. In March 2026, she announced on Instagram that doctors had told her she had only a few weeks left to live, after it was discovered that the tumour had spread further. Her news received national attention.

=== Social initiatives ===
After her diagnosis, Kops shared updates about her journey with cancer via her Instagram account @mijnlevenmetkanker_. Her aim was to raise awareness about childhood cancer and offer support to others facing similar challenges. Together with her parents, she founded the Jade Uitwaaimomenten Foundation, which organises short holidays on the Westland coast for families with a child undergoing cancer treatment, so that they can relax temporarily and make memories. In addition, Kops gave talks at primary and secondary schools about the impact of cancer in children and the use of the word 'cancer' as an insult. Kops also launched a fundraising campaign for the Princess Máxima Centre, raising over 2 million euros for research into childhood cancer.

=== Public appearances ===
Kops was friends with singer Emma Kok, whom she met in 2023 at the Tina Awards, where they were both nominated in the 'Girl Power' category. Kok released a single called "Jade" in 2025. Kops was also present at the premiere of Kok's theatre tour Never Lose Hope on 28 February 2025. In November 2024, Queen Máxima paid a visit to Kops at her home. The meeting was originally scheduled to take place earlier that year at the Princess Máxima Centre, but Kops was unable to attend at the time due to health reasons. During the TV programme Renze, Kops was surprised with a live performance by Claudia de Breij. In September 2025, Kops appeared on Pauw & De Wit alongside her oncologist. She spoke about her illness and the impact of the news from a year earlier that she likely had only twelve months left to live.

=== Death ===
On 24 April 2026, Kops died at the age of 19 due to complications from rhabdomyosarcoma.

== Recognition ==
=== Tribute ===
In January 2026, artist Gert-Jan van der Kooij used a rake to create a portrait of Kops on the beach in her hometown of 's Gravenzande. A playground there was also named after her.

=== Awards ===
In 2024, Kops received a royal honour for her community service and was appointed a Member of the Order of Orange-Nassau. She was presented with the award by the Mayor of Westland, Bouke Arends, in recognition of her work for children with cancer and their families. She was the youngest person to receive this honour. She also received the Westland Youth Achievement Award, 'De Uitblinker', an award for young people who dedicate themselves to the local community. In February 2025, she won the award for Best Instagrammer at The Best Social Awards. In 2026, she came second in The Best Social 100, which meant she received another award.

== Book ==
In the week of her eighteenth birthday, the autobiographical book Voor altijd jong: Mijn leven met kanker was published, in which Kops describes her experiences with illness, treatments and her personal life. The book reached number one in the national Bestseller 60 in February 2025.
