= John Mieremet =

Dutch mobster (1960–2005)

- Born: 10 May 1960; Amsterdam, Netherlands
- Died: 2 November 2005 (aged 45); Pattaya, Thailand

Johannes (John/Johnny) Mieremet (10 May 1960 – 2 November 2005) was a Dutch underworld figure associated with the Willem Endstra extortion and assassination. Born in Amsterdam, Mieremet was murdered at the age of 45, while conducting business in Pattaya, Thailand at around 10:00 a.m. local time. He had survived several earlier assassination attempts; one in 2002, and another on 26 February 2005, when he was shot in the leg and stomach by two perpetrators on a motorcycle.

Mieremet's former lawyer Evert Hingst had been gunned down two days earlier, on Monday 31 October 2005. Hingst's murder was one of several in a string of three related underworld liquidations during late October and early November 2005 and one in a longer series of liquidations that started in 2000.

== Gangster ==
Mieremet was widely feared in the Amsterdam underground. He was considered to be a regular business partner of Sam Klepper who was himself assassinated in October 2000. The duo was known as Spic and Span due to the supposedly efficient, effective and undetectable manner in which they got rid of their opponents. No criminal investigation directed at Mieremet was currently being conducted. Just as Klepper, Mieremet seemed to be invincible to the authorities' efforts. Another famous partner of the duo was Klaas Bruinsma. The Canadian journalists Julian Sher and William Marsden described Mieremet as a "handsome, professional-looking gangster with wire-rimmed glasses and short dark curly hair. He had invested millions of euros in real estate holdings in Amsterdam."

"Let them get rid of each other. Great." This was Mieremet's reaction when he heard about the murder of Evert Hingst. Just a few days before his own demise, on the evening of Hingst's murder, Mieremet gave a telephone interview to crime reporter John van den Heuvel for his new television programme. "They all know too much about each other and now they are messing around amongst themselves. They don't trust each other anymore, fun huh?".

"This actually makes me happy. I know that I survived Evert. That's one thing, that's sure. He belonged between the garbage where he was lying on Monday evening."

The obviously gleeful statements probably relate to the fact that Mieremet accused Hingst of being involved in the nearly-successful assassination attempt on his life in Amsterdam. On 26 February 2002, while leaving Hingst's office, who at the time was one of his lawyers, Mieremet was targeted by a gunman and was seriously wounded. After his recovery he openly talked about the connections between the real-estate business and the underworld in an interview given to the Dutch newspaper De Telegraaf. He named Willem Endstra, who himself was assassinated in 2004, as "the banker to the underworld" and Willem Holleeder as the "guardian of the vault". Mieremet accused Endstra of laundering millions for Willem van Boxtel, the president of the Amsterdam Hells Angels chapter. He suspected Endstra along with Holleeder to be one of the instigators of the attempt on his life. Mieremet stated that he gave Endstra 22 million euros in drug profits for him to launder, which Endstra instead stole. Mieremet stated that he threatened Endstra's life and pointed a gun at him, which in turn led to the attempt on his own life. In July 2019, Holleeder was found guilty of ordering the assassination attempt.

== Assassination ==
When he was killed, Mieremet was busy working on a real estate project in Pattaya. The tourist resort was growing fast and was therefore highly popular among project developers. Mieremet arrived there about one year before his death. Officially he lived in the Belgian town of Neerpelt.

According to local Thai media, Mieremet was shot at 10:00 a.m. in his office in Pattaya, a beach resort in Chonburi Province. A Pattaya People journalist stated that the gunman arrived on the back of a moped and walked into Mieremet's office. Inside the two spoke, possibly in Dutch. At that time the gunman pulled his gun and shot Mieremet in the head. The shooter was described as a 'rather large man wearing a helmet'. The shooter kept on firing while retreating from the office. After the murder he slowly walked outside, stepped on his moped and disappeared. The tall height of the murderer has led to a suggestion that the murderer was not Thai. Mieremet's bodyguard managed to duck for cover just in time, avoiding being shot.

== Books ==
- Sher, Julian; Marsden, William (2006). Angels of Death: Inside the Bikers' Empire of Crime. Toronto: Alfred Knopf Canada. ISBN 9780307370327.
