= Klaas Bruinsma (drug lord) =

Dutch drug lord (1953–1991)

- Born: 6 October 1953; Amsterdam, Netherlands
- Died: 27 June 1991 (aged 37); Amsterdam, Netherlands
- Cause of death: Gunshot wound
- Other names: De Lange; De Dominee
- Occupation: Drug lord

Klaas Bruinsma (6 October 1953 – 27 June 1991) was a Dutch drug lord. He was shot dead on 27 June 1991 by organized crime member and former police officer Martin Hoogland. He was known as "De Lange" ('The Tall One') and also as "De Dominee" ('The Pastor') because of his black clothing and his habit of lecturing others.

== Early life ==
Klaas Bruinsma was born in Amsterdam as the second child of Anton Bruinsma, a Dutch entrepreneur and Gwendolyn Theresa Mary Kelly, a British homemaker. He attended the "De Blauwe Reiger" kindergarten in Amsterdam Oud-Zuid and then the Spartaschool, also in Oud-Zuid. His parents divorced when he was seven years old. From that point forward, his father's housekeeper took over the responsibilities of raising Klaas and his siblings. Klaas' father was the founder of the Dutch soda drink manufacturer Raak. He would make Klaas and his three siblings clean the bottles from the factory on Sundays.

== Career ==
During his high school years, Bruinsma started using hashish and later selling it himself. He was arrested for the first time in 1970 at the age of sixteen. In 1974, he opted to forgo attending college in order to dedicate himself to the drug trade full-time. Thea Moear became his main business partner and together they set up an organization. Thea is the daughter of a Dutch mobster and a Singaporean heroin smuggler. While Bruinsma was mainly involved with the purchase, transport and distribution of the merchandise, Moear managed the finances. She kept track of income and expenses and was also responsible for paying individuals who were hired to get rid of people who were not following instructions.

In 1976, Bruinsma was convicted but was later released in 1977. Upon his release, he changed his identity to Frans van Arkel, nicknamed Lange Frans. He also hired professional kickboxer André Brilleman as his head of security and personal bodyguard after his release from prison. In 1978, he hired Etienne Urka as an extra bodyguard. Urka would later go on to become second in command and Bruinsma's right-hand man. By this time, Bruinsma had expanded his smuggling operations, branching out to Germany, Belgium, France and Scandinavia.

In 1979, Bruinsma was convicted once again, this time for organizing a large hashish transport from Pakistan. He was released in 1982. In 1983, he was involved in a shootout, after some members of his organization decided to steal large stockpiles of hashish and go into business for themselves. He shot several people and was also wounded himself. In 1984, he was sentenced to five years in prison but upon his appeal the sentence was later reduced to three years. During his prison sentence, Bruinsma's father, who was battling cancer, visited him and died shortly after.

After his release in 1987, Bruinsma restructured his drug organization and branched out into hotels, casinos, gaming, brothels, and other "legitimate" forms of business. Etienne Urka replaced Thea Moear as Bruinsma's main business partner, a new division for exploitation of gambling machines was formed under the supervision of Sam Klepper and John Mieremet, and Roy Adkins was appointed leader of the drug division. During this period, André Brilleman was accused of theft; he was brutally murdered by Hugo Ferrol, a competing hashish trader and Thea Moear's husband, and his body was encased in concrete and dumped in the river Waal.

By the end of the 1980s, Bruinsma became the largest drug trader in European history. His organization was generating around a million Dutch guilders per day (roughly US$500,000 at that time). Given his large success, Bruinsma was contemplating retirement to dedicate himself to his passion and hobby of sailing. However, he wanted to right his previous wrong from 1979, and planned to transport 45 tons of hashish from Pakistan into the Netherlands, a much larger amount than what he was arrested for previously. The shipment had a street value of 400 million Dutch guilders (US$200 million at the time). This operation was dubbed "The Big Mountain" by Bruinsma and his close associates. However, the operation was unsuccessful and the shipment was seized upon arrival in the Netherlands. After the failure of the operation, Bruinsma started using cocaine and began extorting other Dutch criminals.

Bruinsma and his gang often hung out at the Amsterdam luxury brothel Yab Yum. In 1990, Bruinsma and his associate Roy Adkins fought in the brothel after one of their operations had gone sour; shots were fired but nobody was injured and nobody talked to the police. Adkins was assassinated later that year. A newspaper article in 2006 reported that true ownership of the brothel had long been in the hands of organized crime figures, beginning with Bruinsma, who called it "the club house." After Bruinsma's death in 1991, his associates Sam Klepper and John Mieremet and the Dutch Hells Angels took over control of the club.

== Death ==
On the night of 27 June 1991, Bruinsma became involved in a verbal argument with Martin Hoogland, a former police officer who was now employed by organized crime. Hoogland shot Bruinsma to death in front of the Amsterdam Hilton hotel at 4 am. Hoogland was murdered in 2004 while on parole.

Bruinsma did not leave a will; his brothers and sisters did not accept anything from his inheritance, so most of it went to his mother. His sailboats, the Amsterdammed and the Neeltje Jacoba, were confiscated by the Tax and Customs Administration.

== Connections to Princess Mabel of Orange-Nassau ==
On 2 October 2003, Charlie da Silva, a former bodyguard of Bruinsma, claimed on Peter R. de Vries' television show that Princess Mabel of Orange-Nassau had been a very close friend of Bruinsma's, and that she had been a regular guest on his yacht during the night. Wisse Smit, who at that point was engaged to Prince Friso, told prime minister Jan Peter Balkenende and Queen Beatrix that she had only been slightly acquainted with Bruinsma. Because of this, the Dutch government decided not to request permission of parliament for the marriage, causing Prince Friso to lose his place in the line of succession to the Dutch throne after his marriage to Princess Mabel.
