= Paul de Vries (criminal) =

Dutch outlaw biker (1949–2004)

- Born: 1949
- Died: February 11, 2004 (aged 54–55); Oirsbeek, Netherlands
- Occupations: Gangster; outlaw biker
- Organization: Hells Angels
- Title: President
- Allegiance: Nomads

Paul de Vries (1949 – 11 February 2004) was a Dutch gangster and outlaw biker.

== Hells Angels ==
De Vries was born into poverty, and spent his youth in a trailer park. De Vries was the president of the elite Nomad chapter of the Dutch Hells Angels based in Limburg. The Nomad chapter whose base was the Limburg province was founded in 1986. The Canadian journalists Julian Sher and William Marsden called De Vries president of one of the "most savage HA chapters in Europe". The Dutch police believe that De Vries committed between 11 and 15 murders himself during his career as a Hells Angel. The American biker expert Thomas Barker called De Vries one of the most "vicious" Hells Angels in Europe. De Vries wore a Fifthly Few patch encrusted with diamonds that the police say is awarded to those who kill for the Hells Angels. One Dutch Hell Angel stated that De Vries was "one of the most evil men on the planet". De Vries's nickname was "the Butcher". His ruthlessness extended even to his biker "brothers" in the Hells Angels. A British Hells Angel, Steven "Grumps" Cunningham, was a member of the elite Nomad chapter based in Swindon, Wiltshire. Cunningham, described by the British police as a major drug trafficker, had money disputes with members of his own Nomad chapter along with De Vries and gone on a trip to the Netherlands to see him. The last message from Cunningham was a cell phone call from Ostend, Belgium on 9 September 1997 and afterwards in the words of a British policeman "he just disappeared off the face of the earth". Cunningham is still listed as missing, but he is generally believed to have been murdered.

De Vries was involved in smuggling drugs from Colombia via the Dutch West Indies into the Netherlands. Marco Hegger, a member of his Nomad chapter frequently visited the United Kingdom to see various British Hells Angels and he made a number of trips to Colombia and Mexico. De Vries's principle contact on the island of Curaçao was Angelo Diaz, a man of mixed Colombian and Dutch descent who served as the liaison between Colombian drug cartels and the Dutch Hells Angels. Diaz was a member of the Caribbean Brothers, a Hells Angels puppet gang based in Curaçao. Curaçao is a center of smuggling with appliances, electronics and cigarettes from Europe being smuggled into Venezuela and Colombia while cocaine from South America was smuggled into Europe. As a part of the Kingdom of the Netherlands, there were no customs checks on flights on passengers flying to and from Curaçao and the Dutch mainland in Europe, which made it very easy to smuggle cocaine. Diaz was officially a fisherman, but his fishing boat which he named Make My Day was used to bring thousands of kilograms of cocaine from South America into Curaçao. The cocaine that Diaz smuggled into Curaçao came from an area in Colombia controlled by the FARC (Fuerzas Armadas Revolucionarias de Colombia-Revolutionary Armed Forces of Colombia).

In November 2002, De Vries arrived on Curaçao and told Diaz that he wanted to smuggle cocaine. Diaz described De Vries as a nightmarish character whose head was shaven totally bald; whose entire muscular body was covered with Hells Angels-related tattoos including the SS lightning-bolt runes (which in the outlaw biker subculture indicates that the wearer has committed a murder); who wore golden rings and earrings; and had a "sinister smile", made worse by his golden teeth, which had replaced his real teeth. De Vries stayed on in Curaçao until March 2003 when he returned to Limburg. De Vries's contact with the Colombians had been a Canadian Hells Angel, Vic Trasmundi, who had joined the Nomad Limburg chapter, but Trasmundi had died suddenly earlier in 2002. De Vries learned from Diaz that the price of cocaine on Curaçao was $3,000 US dollars per kilogram while cocaine was sold for $25,000 US dollars per kilogram in Europe. The principle smuggling partner of De Vries was Donny Klassen, a wealthy businessman in Maastricht, who served as a front for smuggling drugs both into the Netherlands and out of the Netherlands to Australia. Klassen and de Vries were later accused in October 2003 of attempting to ship 195 kilograms of ecstasy tablets to Australia.

According to Diaz, he and De Vries met agents of the Cartagena cartel at the Music Factory dance club in Salina where it was agreed that De Vries and Klassen would import 300 kilograms of cocaine worth $3 million US dollars into Europe with the profits to be divided evenly between the cartel and the Hells Angels with Diaz to receive a 5% commission and another drug dealer, Steven Chocolaad, to receive a 10% commission. In March 2003, Klassen sent a diesel electrical generator to Curaçao where the internal parts were removed, cocaine was placed in vacuum-sealed bags, and the generator welded shut As the ship carrying the cocaine set sail from Willemstad harbor, Diaz, Klassen and De Vries were enjoying drinks in a bay overlooking the harbor and Klassen offered a toast, saying "There it goes". The generator was shipped to Natal, Brazil and from there was intended to go to Lisbon and hence to Maastricht. In late March 2003, the Colombians grew angry and suspicious when they were told that the cocaine was still in Brazil. In April 2003, the Colombians sent an agent to the Netherlands to ask Klassen where the cocaine was, and were told that De Vries was planning to distribute the cocaine on European streets soon. In fact, the cocaine had arrived in the Netherlands in March 2003 and De Vries had sold the cocaine to various drug dealers while keeping the profits all to himself. In May 2003, when the Colombians had still not received any word on where the cocaine was or any money, they accused Klassen of cheating them.

To prevent Chocolaad from revealing to the Colombians that De Vries had scammed the cartel, De Vries killed him. On 16 May 2003, Chocolaad went to see De Vries who strangled him to death, dismembered his corpse and dumped parts of his body into the Juliana Canal. The murder occurred at the home of De Vries's henchman Serge "Moon" Wagner. When Wagner's wife, Ria, came home, she noticed that the house had been so thoroughly cleaned that it reeked of chemicals and some of their furniture was missing. She stated: "Serge told me that he had killed someone, together with Paul. They cut his body into pieces, put it in bags and threw it in the canal. When the newspapers mentioned this find, Serge told me that this was the boy they had killed". Ria Wagner stated that as the wife of a Hells Angel, she regarded her husband murdering someone in their house as normal. On 25 May 2003, pieces of Chocolaad's body were found floating in the Juliana canal; his entire corpse was never recovered.

One Dutch Hells Angel, Jan Laughs, stated when he told De Vries that the Hells Angels had a "no rip-offs" policy on drug deals, Wagner held a knife to his throat. Laughs stated: "Paul de Vries was busy murdering and doing rip deals, which is against Angel rules. Moon took a knife and held it to my throat and asked Paul if he should kill me. Paul didn't want that. Paul killed eleven to fifteen people. Paul de Vries is the worst human being I have ever known, a filthy rat. But he meant something in the international bikers' world. He had many contacts all over the world. Paul de Vries wouldn't do the shooting himself. But Paul can cut. He was a butcher". De Vries was said to have enjoyed killing for the sake of killing and those who knew described him as laughing when he killed.

Diaz was told by the Colombians that he had to ensure that they received 70% of the drug profits now or else he would be killed. In September 2003, Diaz confronted Klassen who told him: "You know what, Angelo? I took it. Tell the Colombians I took it all and I am not giving it back. Whatever they do, I'm ready for war". De Vries had violated the Hells Angels policy against drug "rip-offs" and Hegger later told the police: "We are walking around as shooting targets. This is about millions of dollars, not just about the coke from the Colombians".

== Murder ==
De Vries's main concern in early 2004 was the coming marriage between his daughter Sandra and one of his henchmen, Cor Pijnenburg. De Vries ordered all of the members of his chapter to pay the costs of the wedding. Sandra de Vries' wedding dress alone cost 3,614 euros (the equivalent of $4,237 US dollars) and the way that the wealthy De Vries forced the costs of the wedding onto his own chapter as he was too cheap to pay for his daughter's wedding made him unpopular. Diaz later testified that a member of the Nomads chapter, Peter Schumans, on 10 February 2004 asked Willem van Boxtel, the president of the Hells Angels Amsterdam chapter, for permission to kill De Vries.

De Vries was abusing amphetamines and rarely slept. In a wiretapped phone call, the police heard De Vries talk about a meeting in a sushi bar where something important would be discussed "100 percent" as De Vries phrased it. It was only later that the police learned the "100 percent" discussion was to be about De Vries' plans to purge his own chapter as he suspected several of his followers of plotting against him. On the evening of 11 February 2004, De Vries told his girlfriend, Sam, that he had to attend a "church" meeting (mandatory meeting) as the chapter president, that would last for at most half an hour, and then he would be home again.

On the evening of 11 February 2004, De Vries attended a meeting of his chapter located in a former brothel just outside of the village of Oirsbeek. At about 9:15 pm, a local man, Hubert Rajh, who was driving by the clubhouse, saw De Vries come flying out of the second floor window and land, hurt, but still alive. Rajh saw other Hells Angels drag De Vries back into the clubhouse. Rajh stated that he knew the building was the Hells Angels clubhouse and he was so frightened that he chose not to stop. At the meeting, De Vries, Pijnenburg, and Wagner were taken prisoner by their biker "brothers", lined up against a wall, and all shot. Each victim was shot three times, with a bullet through their chests, right arms, and heads. De Vries was shot seven times, Wagner was shot six times, and Pijnenburg was shot five times. The corpses were all placed into a rented van. The corpses were buried in shallow graves near the Juliana Canal outside of Echt, near a popular footpath along the canal. The bodies were meant to be discovered soon in order to let the Colombians know that the Hells Angels could be trusted to deal with their own. The killers threw out all of the furniture from the clubhouse, thoroughly cleaned the clubhouse, and covered the walls with new coats of plaster and paint. A huge sign was attached to the wall that read in capital letters "OMERTA", a reference to the Mafia code of silence. The three bodies were discovered on 13 February 2004. De Vries rented a secret "love house" that he shared with Sam and used to hide money and jewelry. As far as Sam was aware, no other Hells Angel knew of the "love house". When she went to the "love house" on 13 February, she found the front door was still locked, but the house had been looted with all of the money and valuables that De Vries had hidden there gone. De Vries was buried in a lavish funeral attended by Hells Angels from all over Europe, the United States, Australia and New Zealand. Diaz and several of the Caribbean Brothers flew up from Curaçao to take part in the funeral. His tombstone was decorated with the SS lightning bolt runes which indicated that he had killed for the Hells Angels. Diaz was later to testify that there was general relief within the Hells Angels that de Vries was dead.

Schumans replaced De Vries as the president of the Nomad chapter. On 6 March 2004, Diaz was summoned to Amsterdam to explain to Schumans what had happened to the cocaine that De Vries had stolen. Diaz found himself kidnapped by Marco Hegger and his brother Jack who accused him of being involved in the drug rip-off, which had damaged the image of the Hells Angels in the underworld. Diaz stated that Hegger had told him: "We have scraped the shit off the pavement. We have done it so that if the Colombians come, we can say we did their work for them". Hegger and Schumans took Diaz out to a remote rural area and Diaz suspected that he was going to be killed as both Hells Angels had handguns with them. Hegger told him that there was another "other guy" in Maastricht who could verify Diaz's claims that he was not involved in the drug rip-off, but Diaz knew that was a lie as the only other people involved in the drug deal were Chocolaad and Klassen. Diaz was saved when a man came by walking his dog, which led the Angels to be disappointed as the man had good look at their faces, and as Hegger and Schumans did not wish to kill him, led them to get back into their car. Diaz contacted John van den Heuvel, a former policeman turned crime reporter, whom Diaz still believed to be a policeman. Van den Heuvel in turn placed Diaz into contact with the police in exchange for a scoop on the story. Schumans and Hegger were arrested for De Vries's murder. Hegger expressed much hatred of De Vries to the police as he stated: "Paul was a man you couldn't say no to. He would walk over corpses". However, Hegger refused an offer to turn Crown's evidence as he said: "If word gets out that I've told you all this, then I would rather shoot myself with a bullet through the head than wait for them to do it. Or have my wife and children worried. It's not only the Nomads I have to deal with. After that there's the HA Holland and then the whole world. That's so big!" In June 2004, the entire Nomad chapter in Limburg were arrested and charged with the murders of De Vries, Wagner, and Pijnenburg. Diaz served as the Crown's star witness and testified that the murders were ordered by Boxtel. Boxtel was not charged, but he testified at the trial that he did not order the murders.

With her fiancée, Cor Pijnenburg, murdered, Sandra de Vries was forced to cancel her expensive wedding planned for June of that year. Under Dutch law, anyone who suffered from crime can file for restitution from the perpetrators of the crime. Sandra de Vries filed a restitution claim for from all of the men charged with the murders of her father and her fiancée for the cancelled wedding costs. The judge rejected that application under the grounds that the wedding had not taken place yet, but ordered all the accused to pay her 4,800 euros for the funerals of her father and Pijnenburg.

On 17 March 2005, 12 members of De Vries's chapter were sentenced to 12 years in prison in connection with his slaying. Klassen was convicted of drug trafficking in 2006 and sentenced to six years in prison. Two Dutch Hells Angels accused of the Chocolaad murder were acquitted in 2006.

On June 15 2007, all Hells Angels of the Nomads chapter were acquitted on appeal for the murders of De Vries, Wagner and Pijnenburg. Because all suspects remain silent and the lack of sufficient evidence, it was not possible to reconstruct the events of the night of the killing and who took part in it and who didn't. Hence all were acquitted. “No constitutional state can afford to punish innocent people,” the judge said.

== Books ==
- Barker, Thomas (2007). Biker Gangs and Organized Crime. Lexington: University of Kentucky. ISBN 9781437755077.
- Sher, Julian; Marsden, William (2006). Angels of Death: Inside the Bikers' Empire of Crime. Toronto: Alfred Knopf Canada. ISBN 9780307370327.
