= Willem Holleeder =

Dutch criminal (born 1958)

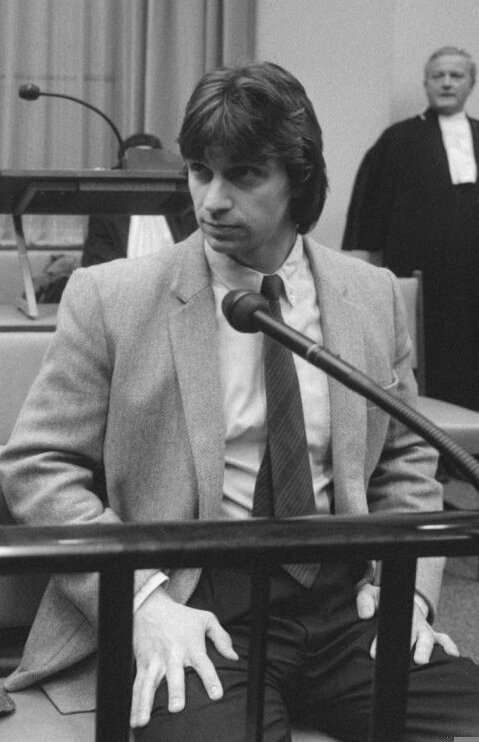
- Holleeder in 1987
- Born: Willem Frederik Holleeder; 29 May 1958 (age 68); Amsterdam, Netherlands
- Parent: Wim Holleeder
- Status: Convicted (life imprisonment)
- Convictions: Murder (5 counts); Manslaughter; Kidnapping; Extortion; Assault
- Penalty: 1983: 11 years' imprisonment 2007: 9 years' imprisonment 2019: Life imprisonment

Willem Frederik Holleeder (born 29 May 1958) is a Dutch gangster, outlaw biker and convicted criminal. He is nicknamed De Neus (The Nose) because of the size of his nose.

In 1983, Holleeder was sentenced to eleven years' imprisonment for his involvement in the kidnapping of Heineken president Freddy Heineken for a 35-million-gulden (approximately €16 million, or US$19.5 million) ransom. Then, in 2007, Holleeder was sentenced to nine years in prison for several counts of extortion, including the extortion of businessman Willem Endstra, who was murdered in 2004 after falling out with Holleeder. He served his sentence in Nieuw Vosseveld and was released on 27 January 2012. He was arrested again in May 2013 (released 12 June 2013), May 2015 and April 2016. In July 2019, he was sentenced to life imprisonment for five murders and one count of manslaughter. The sentence was upheld by the Amsterdam Appeals Court on the 24th of June 2022.

== Early life ==
Born in 1958 in Amsterdam, Willem Holleeder is the son of Wim Holleeder (1927–1990), an employee at the Heineken breweries who lost his job because of alcoholism. As a teenager, he, along with his classmate Cor van Hout, was part of a gang that worked for landlords in evicting squatters, and may have been involved in several robberies. Cor van Hout was later to become his brother-in-law by marrying Holleeder's sister Sonja.

== Heineken kidnapping ==
In 1983, their relatively unknown gang abducted the Heineken heir Freddy Heineken (who had purchased back the family ownership of the brewery), along with his driver Ab Doderer. Ultimately, their demand for 35 million guilders (approximately €16 million, or US$19.5 million) was met by the family, although the police were against it. After Freddy Heineken's release, the kidnappers—Cor van Hout, Willem Holleeder, Jan Boellaard, Frans Meijer, and Martin Erkamps—were all eventually traced and served prison sentences. During this period, Holleeder met many other gangsters, including Dennis Stewart and Yvon Lodewijks, who was later accused of ordering the murder of Holleeder's brother-in-law and co-criminal Cor van Hout.

After serving the Heineken sentence, Holleeder emerged as a high-profile criminal leader. Several million guilders of the Heineken ransom were never traced, and may have been part of the initial sum he and Cor van Hout hoped to use for a new extortion empire; there are said to have been up to 24 people in his crime ring. After his release from prison in 1990, Holleeder was close to Willem van Boxtel, the president of the Hells Angels Amsterdam chapter.

Initially, he was in a business relationship with real estate businessman Willem Endstra, possibly involving money laundering. After Cor van Hout was killed in 2003, Holleeder fell out with Endstra. In early 2004, Endstra was reported to have offered one million euros to Boxtel to have Holleeder killed. Endstra secretly testified to the police about Holleeder, but was shot dead near his office in 2004. It is suspected that Holleeder, along with his partner-in-crime Dino Soerel, ordered the murder of both Willem Endstra and John Mieremet, who was shot and killed in Thailand on 2 November 2005. Holleeder's name keeps turning up in this connection although three suspects in the Endstra murder, Ali N. and C. Özgür of Alkmaar and Cleon D. from Almere have been released. According to Endstra, Holleeder was involved in 25 murders, including that of Cor van Hout.

The Dutch newspaper De Telegraaf reported on 16 July 2006 that Holleeder and Cor van Hout had planned to kidnap Prince Bernhard instead of Freddy Heineken in the 1980s. Thomas van der Bijl, who was murdered in his bar in Amsterdam in April 2006, made these allegations in a deposition before the Dutch national police.

== 2006 trial and sentencing ==
Holleeder's 2006 trial was dubbed the trial of the century. His lawyer, Bram Moszkowicz, argued that media depictions of Holleeder as one of the "topcriminelen" had prejudiced the case against him. However, Moszkowicz was forced to resign after media allegations of conflict of interest, since he had also been the lawyer for Willem Endstra.

Among the witnesses in the trial was lawyer Bram Zeegers, who testified that Holleeder had been extorting millions of euros from Endstra between 2000 and 2004. A week after the testimony, Zeegers was found dead of a drug overdose.

In late 2007, Holleeder underwent a heart valve surgery; initially, reports of his failing health were thought to be a hoax, but a 2009 medical opinion seemed to suggest that he was indeed in poor health and might not survive the sentence he was serving at the time.

Whilst under detention in 2008, he was arrested for alleged involvement in the murder of Yugoslav drug dealer Serge Miranovic in 2006.

Holleeder was found guilty of extortion and sentenced to nine years in prison, at a time held in Nieuw Vosseveld. His subsequent appeal was turned down by the appeals court in July 2009.

== After his release ==
Holleeder was released from De Schie prison in Rotterdam on 27 January 2012, after serving two-thirds of his nine-year term. He had been due to be released on 31 January but was let out a few days earlier to avoid publicity. After his release he appeared on television in the show College Tour in 2012. He also made a record named Willem is terug ("Willem is back") in September 2012 together with Lange Frans, a Dutch rapper. Various politicians condemned his appearance, saying that Holleeder should not become a cult hero. In addition, from September 2012 until 7 March 2013 Holleeder wrote a weekly column for the Dutch magazine Nieuwe Revu.

In February 2013, Holleeder co-founded the motorcycle club No Surrender MC and served as vice-president of its Amsterdam branch.

== 2013 arrest ==
In May 2013, Holleeder was arrested in a large operation involving 450 police and army personnel. He was suspected of extortion. The victim of the alleged extortion was Theo Huisman, the former president of the Amsterdam chapter of the Hells Angels Holland. On 12 June 2013 Holleeder was released from prison but remained a suspect in the case. Back in jail, in May 2015 it became known that Holleeder knew who was involved in the murder of his brother-in-law, Cor van Hout. Holleeder's sister Astrid, a criminal lawyer, feared that Holleeder planned to assassinate her, and so she proposed to assist in his prosecution. While visiting him in prison she secretly recorded his confession and handed it to the police.

== 2016 arrest and alleged assassination plot ==
In April 2016, Holleeder was arrested again, while still in prison, for allegedly soliciting two members of a gang (known as the Curaçao No Limit Soldiers) to kill his sisters Astrid and Sonja as well as Investigative Journalist Peter R. de Vries, a witness in the mega-trial. Holleeder dismissed the charge as "nonsense", insisting that it would not be in his "interest" to kill his sisters. The gang member who informed the authorities about the plot subsequently recanted his confession, though Astrid believes that he did so only because he is also afraid of her brother.

== 2019 verdict ==
In July 2019, the Court in Amsterdam convicted Holleeder after a lengthy and extensive trial at the age of 61 to life imprisonment for his involvement in a series of five murders, including that of his former friend and criminal associate Cor van Hout, and one case of manslaughter, thus following the demand of the prosecutor and brushing off his denials. The trial was held in De Bunker.

The judges also found that he had formed a crime gang and ordered killings with jailed associate Dino Soerel and since-murdered criminal Stanley Hillis.

The prosecution case relied on the sensational testimony of his sister, Astrid, who made secret recordings of their conversations. Victim Van Hout was married to Holleeder's sister Sonja, and she too gave evidence against him.

The cases in which Holleeder was found guilty

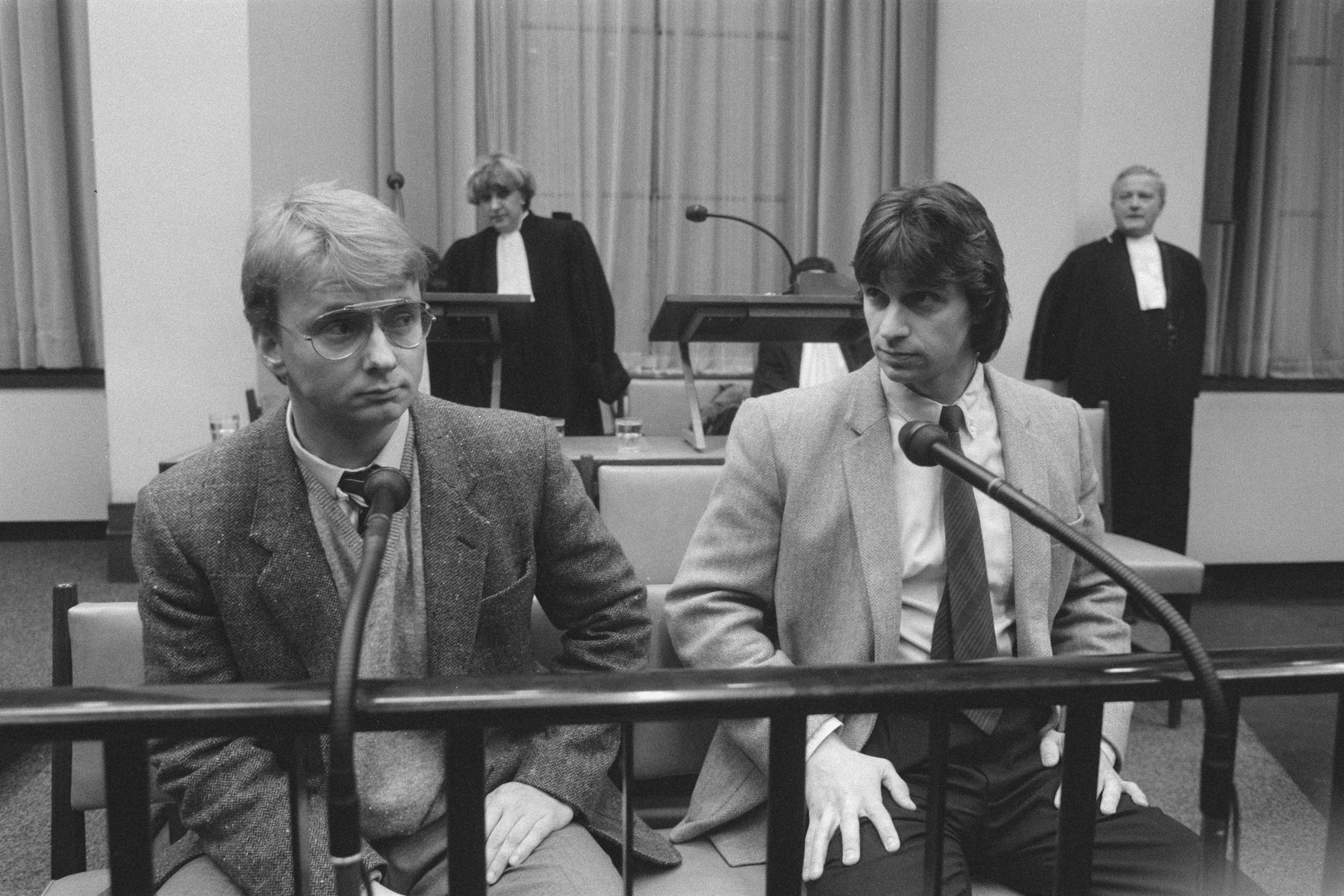
Cor van Hout and Willem Holleeder

Sam Klepper, criminal - shot dead, 2000
Cor van Hout, friend, brother-in-law and ex-accomplice - shot dead, 2003
Willem Endstra, property developer - shot dead, 2004
Kees Houtman, drug dealer - shot dead, 2006
Thomas van der Bijl, bar owner and family friend - shot dead, 2006

He was also found guilty of ordering the 2002 attempted murder of John Mieremet, Klepper's business partner (later shot dead in Thailand in 2005) and of the manslaughter of Robert ter Haak, who died of bullet wounds during the fatal attack that Holleeder had ordered on Cor van Hout.

Holleeder appealed the verdict. In June 2022, Holleeder was again sentenced to life imprisonment on appeal. He announced his intention to file another appeal with the Supreme Court of the Netherlands, the highest court in the country. In 2024, the Supreme Court affirmed the life sentence originally imposed on Holleeder.

== Bibliography ==
- Holleeder, Astrid (2016). Judas. Een familiekroniek (in Dutch). Amsterdam: Lebowski. ISBN 9789048825028.
  - In English translation: Holleeder, Astrid (2018). Judas: How a Sister's Testimony Brought Down a Criminal Mastermind. Mulholland Books. ISBN 9780316475310.
- Sher, Julian; Marsden, William (2006). Angels of Death: Inside the Bikers' Empire of Crime. Toronto: Alfred Knopf Canada. ISBN 9780307370327.
