= Willem Endstra =

Dutch businessman (1953–2004)

- Born: 12 January 1953; Amsterdam, Netherlands
- Died: 17 May 2004 (aged 51); Amsterdam, Netherlands
- Occupation: Real estate

Willem Alexander Arnold Peter Minne Endstra (12 January 1953 – 17 May 2004) was a Dutch real estate trader.

== Money laundering ==
Endstra worked in his parents' real estate business and studied law at the Vrije Universiteit, and started his own business, Convoy Vastgoed BV, in 1987. A scion of a wealthy and well-respected family, Endstra had extensive investments in real estate, banking and railroads. The Canadian journalists Julian Sher and William Marsden described Endstra: "A slick dresser, he liked expensive suits, big open collars and shiny black shoes. With his short-cropped, salt-and-pepper hair, pudgy face and permanent tan, he had the aura of a highly polished middle-aged tycoon". The Dutch media referred to him as "Willem the Silent" as he never spoke to media until 2004. Endstra lived like a man in fear of his life as his expensive penthouse overlooking the Seaport Marina where the North Sea Canal flowed into the North Sea was encased in bulletproof glass while his BMW 540i proteq automobile likewise had bulletproof windows. Endstra had a team of 12 bodyguards around him at all times to protect him from being kidnapped or murdered. Endstra was very close to Willem van Boxtel, the president of the Hells Angels Amsterdam chapter.

In 1992, Endstra was investigated for allegedly using his business for laundering the profits of a criminal gang dealing in ecstasy. The case was closed when Endstra made a deal with public prosecutors in Amsterdam worth about €450,000 to prevent criminal prosecution. It is generally accepted that the 1992 investigation was ended after Endstra had bribed the prosecutor with 1 million guilders to cease the investigation.

Dutch criminal John Mieremet claimed in 2002 that, together with Sam Klepper, he was brought into contact with Endstra via Heineken-kidnapper Willem Holleeder. On 26 February 2002, Mieremet was shot in the stomach during a failed murder attempt in Amsterdam. At a press conference, Mieremet accused Endstra along with Holleeder as being the men responsible for the failed murder attempt. Mieremet stated that Endstra was the "banker to the underworld" who laundered millions via his real estate holdings and Holleeder was the "guardian of the bank vault". Mieremet had stated he had given 22 million euros in drug profits to Endstra to launder, which he had instead stolen. Mieremet stated that he had threatened to kill Endstra and pointed a gun at him in a meeting in his office, which was the reason why Endstra had hired someone to kill him. Endstra denied these allegations, but when a picture of Endstra was published in the magazine Quote later that year, Endstra was seen sitting with Holleeder on a bench in front of Endstra's offices. That same magazine reported Endstra's net worth that year to be around €350 million.

When another person involved in the kidnapping of Heineken, Cor van Hout, was murdered in 2003, informants told the Amsterdam police that Endstra would be next. The allegations that Endstra had stolen from Mieremet led to concerns in the underworld that he might have stolen from other gangsters whom he laundered money for. In early 2004, Endstra was said to have offered one million euros to Boxtel to kill Holleeder.

== Murder ==
On 14 May 2004, Dutch police announced they would not look further into money laundering allegations against Endstra. Two days later, Endstra appeared on the television program Business Class to deny the money laundering allegations. The day after the broadcast, on 17 May, Endstra was shot near his offices in Amsterdam. He died later that day in a hospital (and was buried at Zorgvlied cemetery). The shooter remains unknown. Willem Holleeder was convicted of ordering the killing in July 2019.

== Aftermath ==
Some time later it became public knowledge that Endstra had tried to plot Holleeder's murder by hiring some Hells Angels. Also it became apparent that Endstra had likely been extorted by Holleeder since 2002. Holleeder himself was arrested in 2006 for this act among others.

According to a story in Dutch newspaper Het Parool in March 2006, Endstra had on more than one occasion talked to police about the criminal environment of Amsterdam. Altogether these interviews resulted in more than 200 pages of notes. In them, Endstra told the police that Holleeder was behind the murders of 25 people, including Cor van Hout, Sam Klepper, Jan Femer, George Plieger, Magdi Barsoum, Jules Jie and Gijs van Dam.

== Books ==
- Sher, Julian; Marsden, William (2006). Angels of Death: Inside the Bikers' Empire of Crime. Toronto: Alfred Knopf Canada. ISBN 9780307370327.
