= Sam Klepper =

Dutch criminal (1960–2000)

Simon "Sam" Klepper (29 April 1960 – 10 October 2000) was a Dutch gangster.

== "Spic and Span" ==
Klepper was born in Amsterdam into a working-class family. He started to work in the 1980s for Klaas Bruinsma as a thief and in charge of his slot machines. In the early 1980s, he formed a close partnership with John Mieremet, initially as part of a gang called De Denkers. In the 1990s, Klepper and Mieremet broke away from De Denkers to work as bank robbers and hitmen. The nickname for Mieremet and Klepper were "Spic & Span" (a type of cleaning product) owing to their ability to commit crimes so cleanly that the police never had enough evidence to charge with any offense. On August 29, 1991, Klepper was arrested together with Mieremet for the illegal possession of guns. Both were sentenced to a year and a half in prison.

== Hells Angels ==
Klepper joined the Amsterdam chapter of the Hells Angels and rose up to the rank of "prospect" (the second level in an outlaw biker club). The Canadian journalists Julian Sher and William Marsden described Klepper as "an infamous and vicious Dutch bank robber, arms dealer and drug trafficker who had made more than enough enemies in his time, but nobody had ever dared to touch him because he had the backing of the Hells Angels". Klepper was known as "the Godfather of the Amsterdam underworld".

== Murder ==
On 10 October 2000, Klepper was standing outside of his apartment in the rain along with his Serbian bodyguard. An assassin walked up to him with a submachine gun hidden under his umbrella, which he pulled out to shoot Klepper dead. Klepper's bodyguard set off in a wild chase through the streets of Amsterdam and through a marketplace, exchanging shots with the assassin. An eighty-year-old man out for walk was caught in the cross-fire and was badly wounded. The assassin got into a waiting car and fled.

The president of the Amsterdam chapter of the Hells Angels, Willem van Boxtel, gave Klepper the posthumous promotion to a "full patch" member. He had the largest Hells Angel funeral ever in the Netherlands attended by Hells Angels members from all over Europe. On 17 October 2000, a huge procession of motorcycle-riding Hells Angels escorted Klepper's hearse down the streets of Amsterdam, stopped in front of the police station to set off fireworks, resumed the funeral march and set off more fireworks when Klepper was finally buried. On 4 July 2019, Willem Holleeder was found guilty of ordering Klepper's murder.

== Books ==
- Sher, Julian; Marsden, William (2006). Angels of Death: Inside the Bikers' Empire of Crime. Toronto: Alfred Knopf Canada. ISBN 9780307370327.
