= Afro-Curaçaoans =

Curaçaoans of African descent

Afro-Curaçaoan (Curaçao)
Afro-Curaçaoënaars (Dutch)
- (Curaçao)

Regions with significant populations
- Curaçao

Languages
- Papiamentu • Dutch • Spanish • English

Religion
- Christianity

Related ethnic groups
- Afro-Aruban • Afro-Dutch • Afro-Caribbeans • Afro-Surinamese people

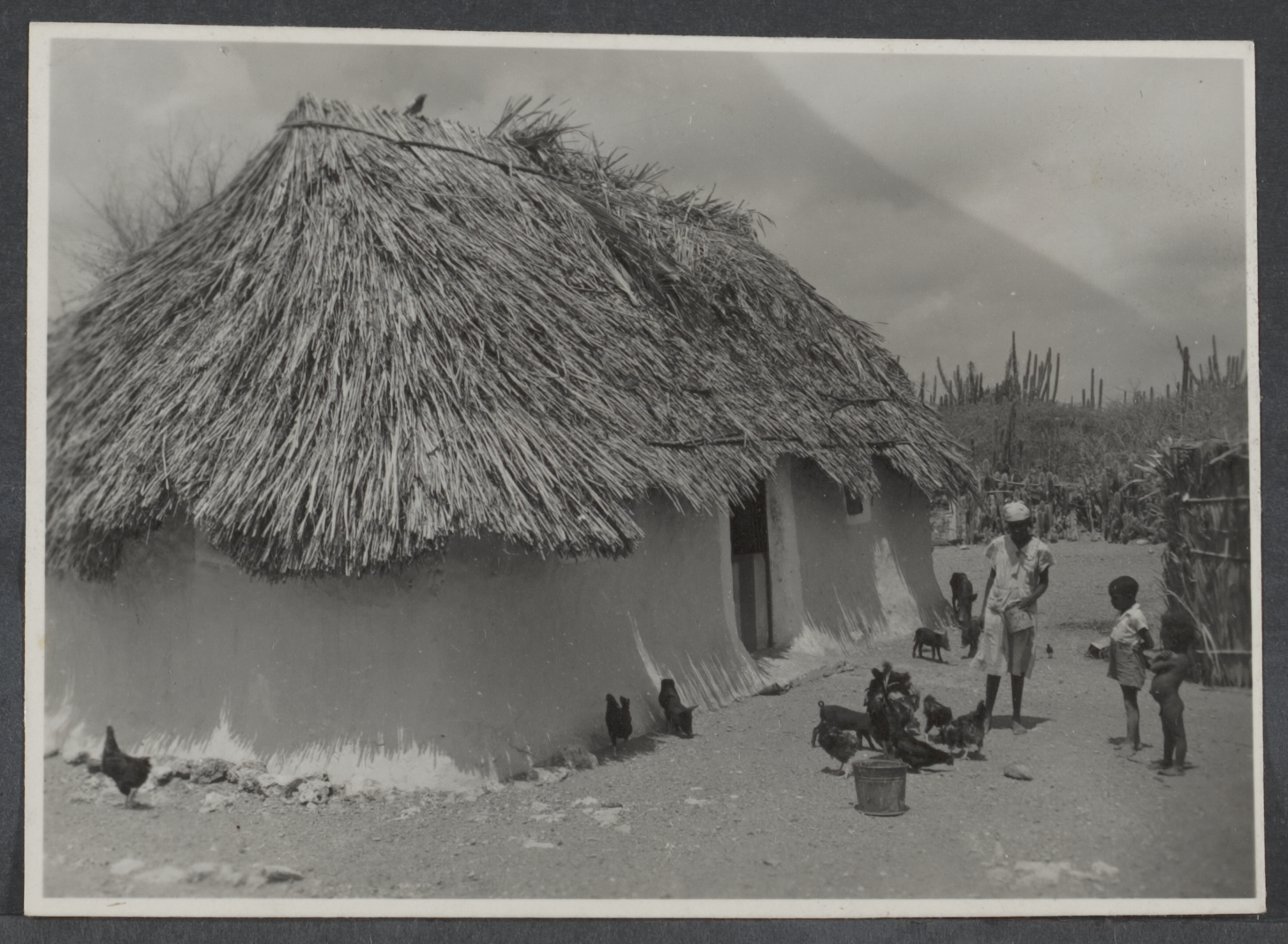
Afro-Curaçaoans in Lagun village

Afro-Curaçaoans are people from the island of Curaçao of fully or partially African descent. They make up the majority of Curaçao's population.

== Origins ==
Most enslaved Africans came from West Central Africa (specifically from Loango and Cabinda Province) with over 38,000 enslaved Africans. The rest of the enslaved Africans were imported from Bight of Benin (over 37,000 enslaved Africans), Ghana (15,000 enslaved Africans came from this place, many of them were Ashantis), Other places in Africa (3,268 enslaved Africans) include Senegambia (over 2,000 enslaved Africans), Sierra Leone (669 enslaved Africans), the Windward Coast (542 enslaved Africans) and the Bight of Biafra (over 1,000 enslaved Africans).

== History ==
The Dutch West India Company founded the capital of Willemstad on the banks of an inlet called the 'Schottegat'. Curaçao had been ignored by colonists, because it lacked gold deposits. The natural harbour of Willemstad proved to be an ideal spot for trade. Commerce and shipping — and piracy—became Curaçao's most important economic activities. In addition, the Dutch West India Company made Curaçao a centre for the Atlantic slave trade in 1662.

Although a few plantations were established on the island by the Dutch, the first profitable industry established on Curaçao was salt mining. The mineral was a lucrative export at the time and became one of the major factors responsible for drawing the island into international commerce.

For much of the 17th and 18th centuries, the primary business of the island was the slave trade. Enslaved Africans arrived often from Africa and were bought and sold on the docks in Willemstad before continuing on to their ultimate destination. The enslaved Africans that remained on the island were responsible for working the plantations established earlier. This influx of inexpensive manpower made the labor-intensive agricultural sector far more profitable and between the Netherlands and China the trading done on the docks and the work being done in the fields, the economic profile of Curaçao began to climb, this time built on the backs of the enslaved Africans.

In 1795, a major slave revolt took place under the lead of Tula Rigaud, Louis Mercier, Bastian Karpata, and Pedro Wakao. Up to 4000 enslaved Africans on the northwest section of the island revolted. Over a thousand of the enslaved Africans were involved in heavy gunfights and the Dutch feared for their lives. After a month, the rebellion was crushed.

The Dutch abolished slavery in 1863, creating a change in the economy. When the institution was abolished ten years later, the island’s economy was severely crippled.

Some inhabitants of Curaçao emigrated to other islands, such as Cuba to work in sugar cane plantations.

Other former enslaved Africans had no place to go and remained working for the plantation owner in the tenant farmer system. This was an instituted order in which the former slave leased land from his former master. In exchange the tenant promised to give up most of his harvest to the former slave master. This system lasted until the beginning of the 20th century.

=== Curaçao's maroons in Coro ===
According to the historian Luis Dovale Prado, between May 1702 and 1704, Spanish authorities residents in Coro, Venezuela, began to observe successive arrivals of a growing group of maroons to the east coast of the area, all them from the island of Curaçao and escaping from the French company Guinea (a French colonial empire organization that was dedicated to the sale of enslaved Africans in American territories and had representatives or commercial factors seats in Coro and Curaçao).

In 1704, the concern about the maroons became more important, when the colonial authorities found that certainly Coro had 30 maroons, including a mulatto, and also had come fleeing from Curaçao using in your crossing some canoes, small canoes or other boats rustic and risky. The Spanish of Coro organized the called "cacería" (hunt) for to pursue to the Maroons and for that purpose made use of the cooperation they received from the Caquetíos, with whom they maintained close partnership from the very beginning of the Spanish colonial invasion process.

== Cultural contributions ==
- Papiamentu, majority language of Curaçao and, probably, born there, is of partial African origin. Although some linguists believe that Papiamento may have arisen on Curaçao the consensus among linguists is that it arose in Africa. Some linguists who have studied Papiamento suggest the arrival of enslaved Africans from Cape Verde (most Cape Verdeans are of Guinean origin) and Sao Tomé of Angolan origin to the islands may have influenced the creation of this language. During slavery, Afro-Curaçaoans used the Guene language to hide their conversations from their enslavers, and this language survives to the modern period in songs and sayings.
- The island celebrates its cultural heritage with the Harvest Festival that lasts for a month. It is quite unusual party that begins with a parade in Otrobanda the Monday following Easter Sunday and continues for three more weekends. The parades revive the festive march (called seú in the native language) of enslaved Africans bringing in the harvest, where women carry baskets on their heads while the men play drums and make sounds with cow horns. The stylized dances and songs symbolize the planting and harvesting of crops. The parade recreates folk tradition with graceful and elegant costumes as well as dance and music.

== Notable Afro-Curaçaoans ==
- Akisha Albert, beauty pageant
- Ozzie Albies, baseball player
- Vurnon Anita, football player
- Frank Martinus Arion, poet
- Jandino Asporaat, comedian and actor
- Dyanne Bito, football player
- Liemarvin Bonevacia, sprinter
- Enith Brigitha, swimmer
- Didi Gregorius, baseball player
- Jeanne Henriquez, educator, historian and activist
- Kemy Agustien, footballer
- Kenley Jansen, baseball player
- Andruw Jones, baseball player
- Churandy Martina, sprinter
- Hensley Meulens, baseball player
- Jurickson Profar, baseball player
- Tula Rigaud, abolitionist and freedom fighter
- Dylan Timber, football player
- Jurrien Timber, football player
- Quinten Timber, football player
- Quenten Martinus
- Rutsel Martha, lawyer, scholar
- Charlison Benschop
- Jaron Vicario
- Javier Martina
- Jurensley Martina
- Endy Opoku Bernadina
- Gevaro Nepomuceno
- Rigino Cicilia
- Rowendy Sumter
- Shanon Carmelia
- Shurandy Sambo
- Tahith Chong
- Jafar Arias
- Eldridge Rojer
