= 2018 in the Netherlands =

- Decades: 1990s; 2000s; 2010s; 2020s
- See also: Other events of 2018; History of the Netherlands

This article lists major events that happened in 2018 in the Netherlands.

== Incumbents ==
- Monarch: Willem-Alexander
- Prime Minister: Mark Rutte (VVD)
- Speaker of the House of Representatives: Khadija Arib (PvdA)
- President of the Senate: Ankie Broekers-Knol (VVD)

== Events ==
- 6 February – Ronald Koeman takes over as coach of the Netherlands national football team
- 12 February – opening of Waddinxveen Triangel railway station
- 13 February – Halbe Zijlstra (VVD) resigns as Minister of Foreign Affairs
- 1 March – Ambassador and Permanent Representative of the Netherlands to the United Nations Karel van Oosterom is appointed President of the United Nations Security Council for one month
- 6 March – a mentally disturbed man armed with two knives tries to enter a school in Alphen aan den Rijn; a group of students chases him off by throwing bags at him before his arrest by police officers
- 21 March – 2018 Dutch municipal elections and 2018 Dutch Intelligence and Security Services Act referendum
- 22 March – a man attempts suicide by jumping off the public gallery of the House of Representatives
- 28 March – opening of Eemshaven railway station
- 15 April – PSV Eindhoven wins the 2017–18 Eredivisie
- 17 June – at the Pinkpop Festival in Landgraaf, one falls dead after a van crashed into a crowd; the driver turns himself in to the police the day after
- 19 June – police forces arrest three men in Rotterdam, Schinnen and Groningen suspected of planning a terrorism act; two other men suspected of planning a terrorist attack had been arrested two days before in Rotterdam in an unrelated case
- 11 July – Andries Heidema (CU) is appointed to be the King's Commissioner of Overijssel
- 12 July – Femke Halsema (GL) takes over as Mayor of Amsterdam
- 21 July – opening of the North–South Line (Route 52) of the Amsterdam Metro
- 31 August – 2018 Amsterdam stabbing attack, the Afghan perpetrator is arrested after wounding two American tourists
- 13 September – a woman disrupts an event in Schiedam attended by Queen Máxima, yelling about the situation of her handicapped son and holding a letter; she is held away by police officers before the Queen approached her to talk and take the letter
- 20 September – a Moroccan man previously convicted in the death of Richard Nieuwenhuizen and several other affairs is banned from the Netherlands for a period of 10 years, the Immigration and Naturalisation Service (IND) stating that he represented a grave threat to public safety
- 9 October – Rob Jetten becomes leader of the Democrats 66 in the House of Representatives
- 14 October – Mayor Jos Wienen (VVD) gives a speech from the balcony of the City Hall of Haarlem, accompanied by Deputy Prime Minister Kajsa Ollongren, after Wienen received death threats
- 17–21 October – Amsterdam Dance Event, Dutch DJ Martin Garrix wins DJ Mag's Top 100 first place for the third time
- 1 November – Jeanine Hennis-Plasschaert is appointed Special Representative of the Secretary-General for the United Nations Assistance Mission for Iraq; Thom de Graaf becomes Vice-President of the Council of State
- 19 November – NCTV Dick Schoof is appointed as new Director of the General Intelligence and Security Service (AIVD)
- 9 December – opening of Lansingerland-Zoetermeer railway station

== See also ==
- 2017–18 Eredivisie
- List of Dutch Top 40 number-one singles of 2018
- Netherlands in the Eurovision Song Contest 2018
- Netherlands in the Junior Eurovision Song Contest 2018

== Deaths ==
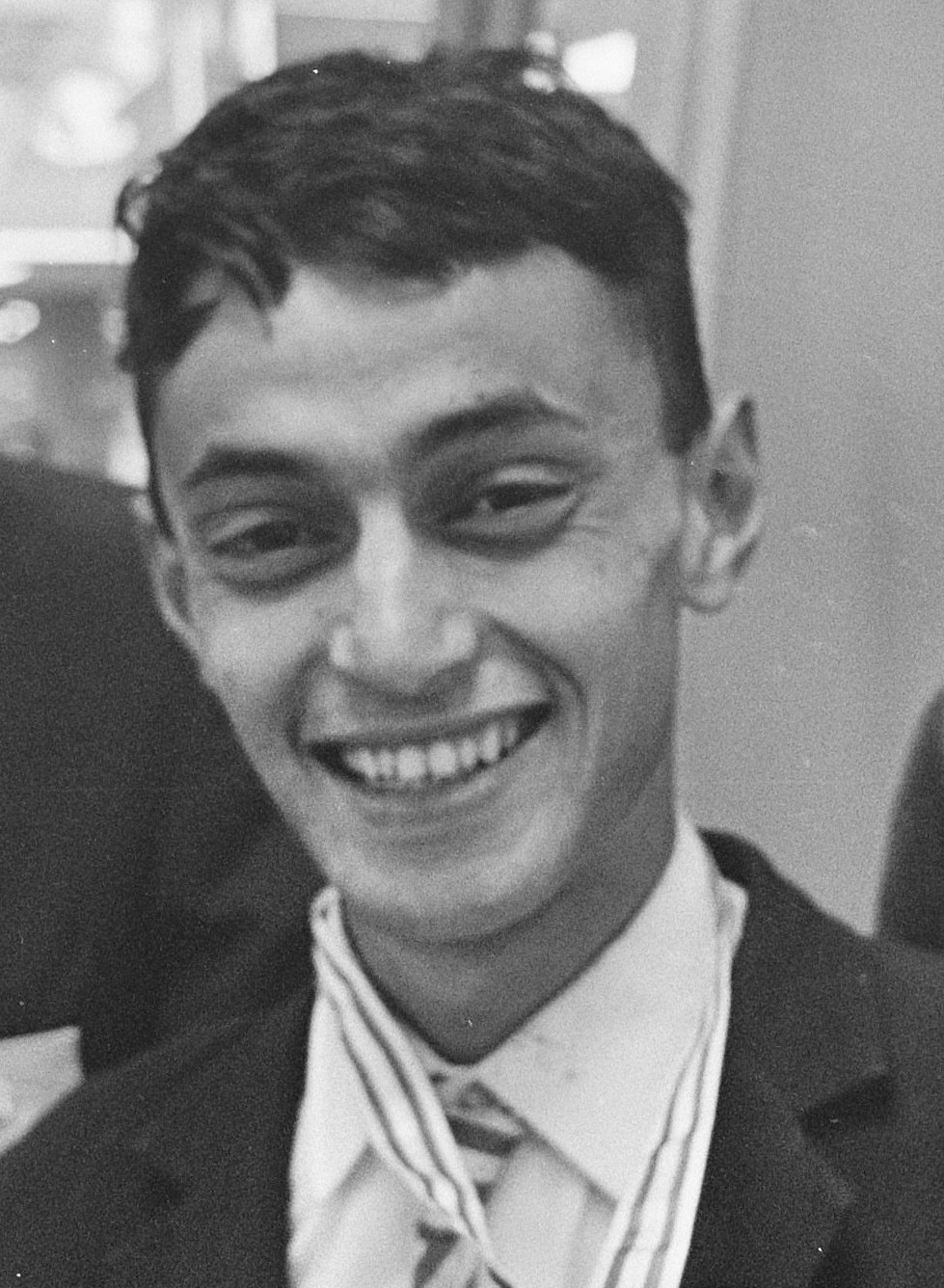
Roderick Rijnders

- 2 January – Eugène Gerards, footballer (b. 1940)
- 12 January – Eddy Beugels, cyclist (b. 1944)
- 14 January – John Pierik, sports shooter (b. 1949)
- 15 January – Roderick Rijnders, rower (b. 1941)
- 19 January – Dik Abed, cricketer (b. 1944)
- 20 January – Antonius Jan Glazemaker, Roman Catholic archbishop (b. 1931)
- 22 January – Reinier Kreijermaat, footballer (b. 1935)
- 24 January – Jan Steeman, comics artist (b. 1933)
- 31 January – Hennie Hollink, footballer (b. 1931)
- 12 February – Martin van der Borgh, racing cyclist (b. 1934)

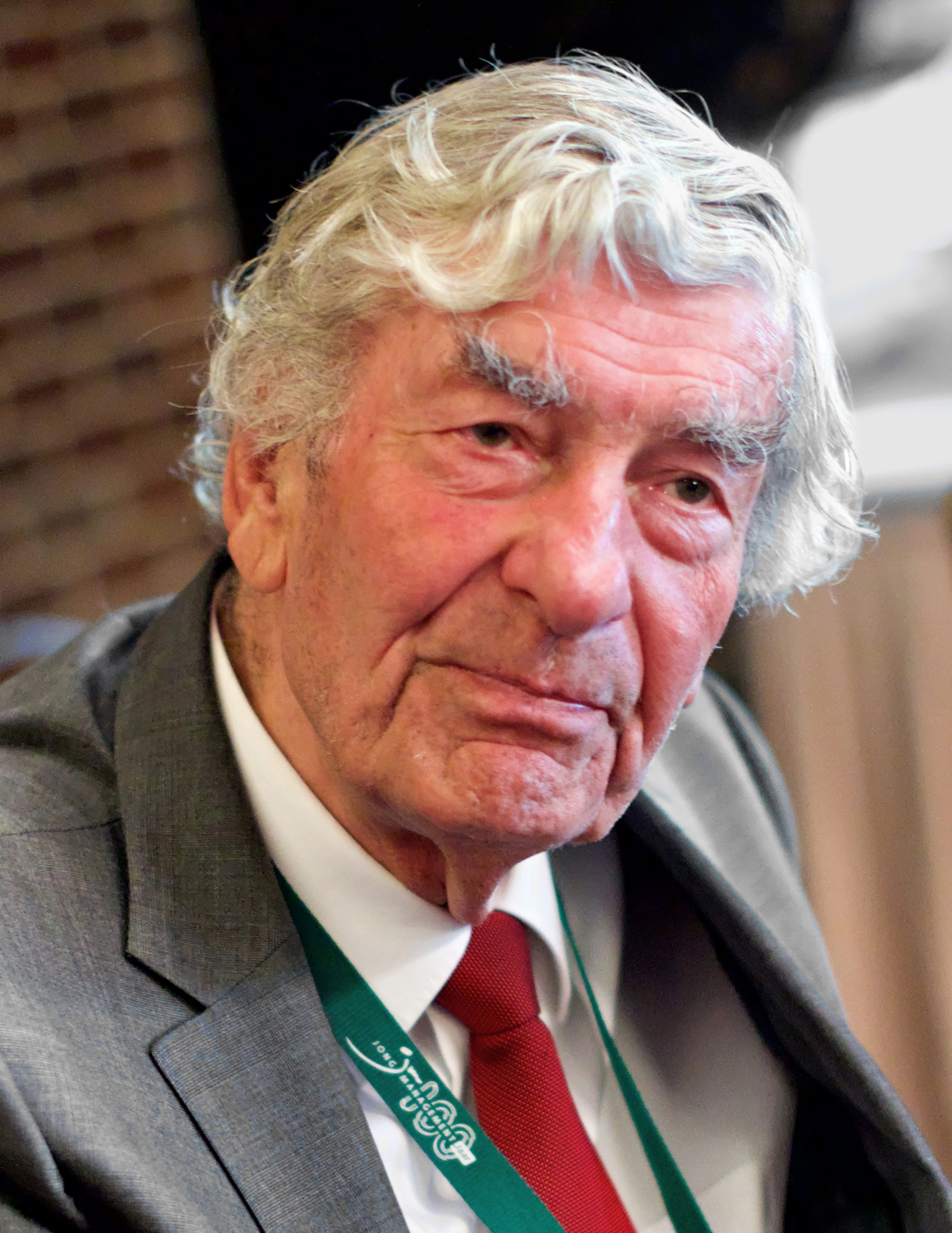
Ruud Lubbers

- 14 February – Ruud Lubbers, former Prime Minister (b. 1939)
- 26 February – Mies Bouwman, television presenter (b. 1929)
- 21 March – Rolf Leeser, footballer and fashion designer (b. 1929)

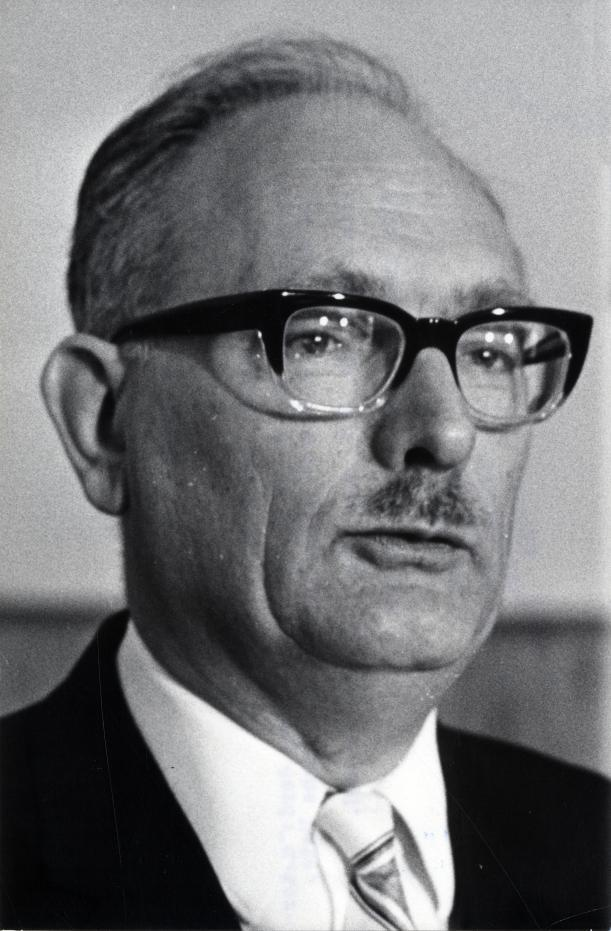
Johan van Hulst

- 22 March – Johan van Hulst, school director, politician (b. 1911)
- 31 March – Jan Snoeck, sculptor and ceramist (b. 1927)
- 23 April – Henk Temming, footballer (b. 1923)
- 2 May – Herman Krebbers, violinist (b. 1923)

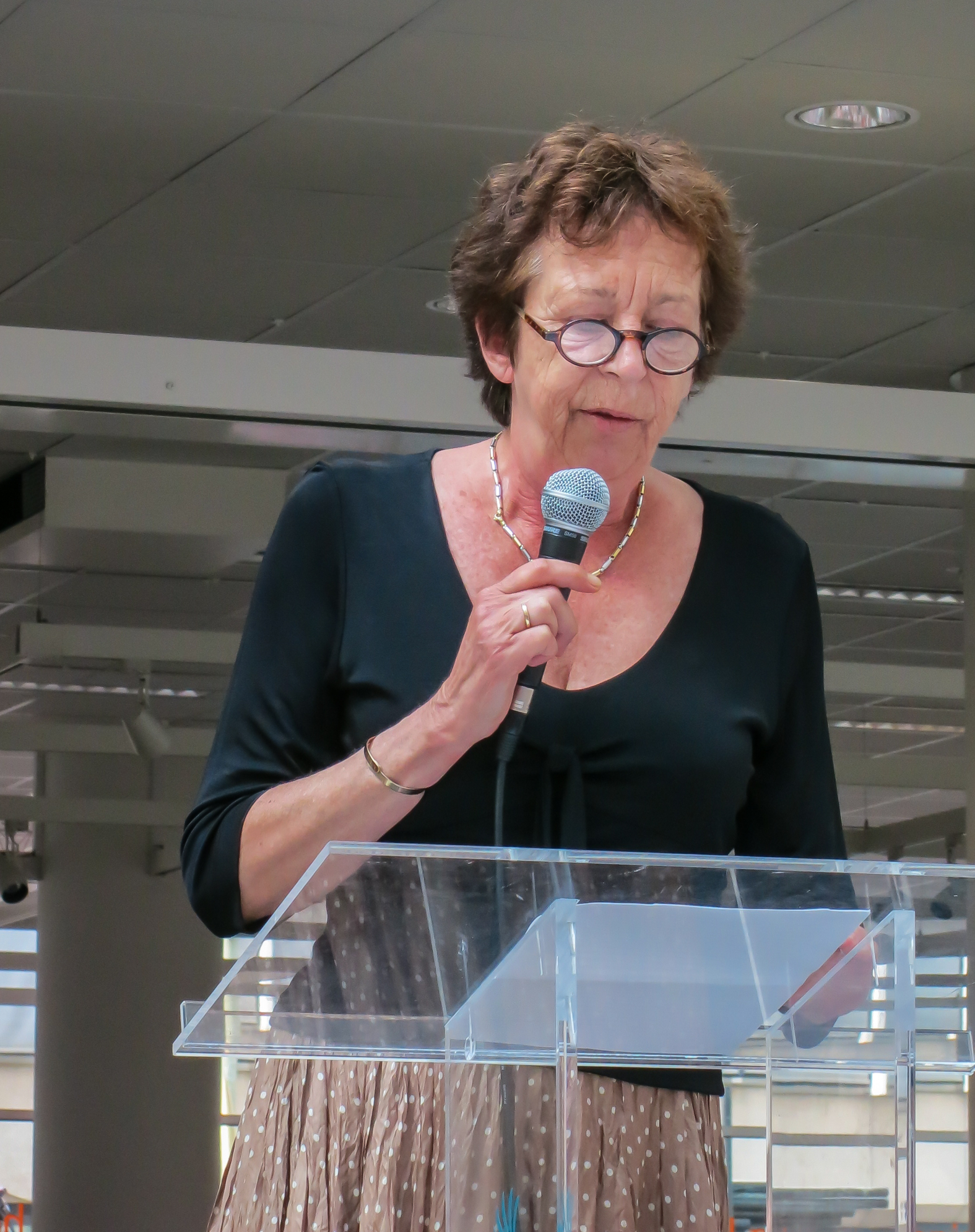
Renate Dorrestein

- 4 May – Renate Dorrestein, writer (b. 1954)

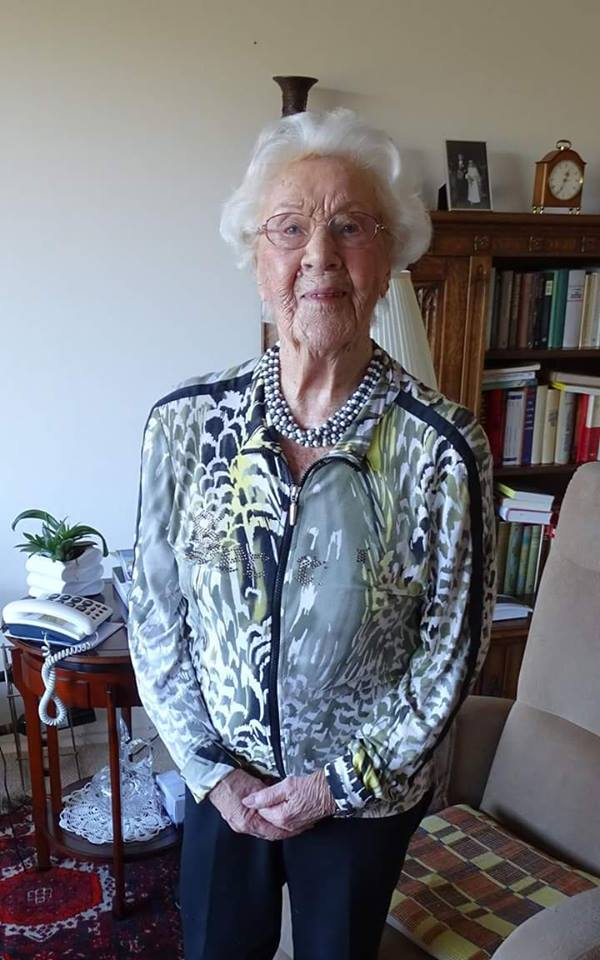
Mien Schopman-Klaver

- 10 July – Mien Schopman-Klaver, athlete (b. 1911)
- 26 July – Anne Vermeer, politician (b. 1916)
- 4 October – Bert Romp, Olympic equestrian, gold medalist (b. 1958).
- 20 October – Wim Kok, former Prime Minister (b. 1938)
