= 2019 in the Netherlands =

- Decades: 1990s; 2000s; 2010s; 2020s
- See also: Other events of 2019; History of the Netherlands

Events from the year 2019 in the Netherlands.

== Incumbents ==
- Monarch: Willem-Alexander
- Prime Minister: Mark Rutte (VVD)
- Speaker of the House of Representatives: Khadija Arib (PvdA)
- President of the Senate: Jan Anthonie Bruijn (VVD)

== Events ==
- 1 January –
  - A celebratory fire on the beach in Scheveningen caused a spark rain over the surrounding neighbourhood, setting multiple buildings on fire
  - Arthur van Dijk (VVD) is sworn in as the King's Commissioner of North Holland
- 1 February –
  - Hans Oosters (PvdA) becomes the King's Commissioner of Utrecht
  - Pieter-Jaap Aalbersberg is appointed Nationaal Coördinator Terrorismebestrijding en Veiligheid (NCTV)
- 6 February – John Berends (CDA) takes over as the King's Commissioner of Gelderland
- 18 March – Three people are killed and seven others are injured in the 2019 Utrecht shooting
- 20 March – 2019 provincial elections
- 18 May – Duncan Laurence wins the Eurovision Song Contest 2019; the Netherlands' first victory since 1975
- 23 May – 2019 European Parliament election in the Netherlands
- 27 May – 2019 Senate election
- 11 June – Ankie Broekers-Knol (VVD) is appointed State Secretary for Justice and Security following the resignation of Mark Harbers
- 2 July – Jan Anthonie Bruijn (VVD) is elected President of the Senate
- 2 July – Groep Otten is formed in the Senate by former members of Forum for Democracy
- 4 July – Willem Holleeder is sentenced to life in prison
- 1 August – The burqa ban in schools, public transport, hospitals and government buildings voted by the States General comes into application. The burqa ban was not a full ban on the covering; in fact the law was named the Partial Ban on Face-Covering Clothing Act, and it did not prohit burqa wearing just on the street.
- 10 August – Part of AFAS Stadion's roof collapses; no one is wounded
- 23 August – Sybrand van Haersma Buma, who had left the office of Leader of the Christian Democratic Appeal in May, becomes Mayor of Leeuwarden
- 18 September – Murder of Derk Wiersum
- 30 September – Koen Schuiling (VVD) is appointed Mayor of Groningen
- 1 October – Beginning of the farmers' protests
- 7 October – Pauline Krikke (VVD) resigns as Mayor of the Hague
- 16–20 October – Amsterdam Dance Event
- 15 December – Opening of Zwolle Stadshagen railway station
- 19 December – Ridouan Taghi, wanted for suspected involvement in at least 10 murders (including Wiersum), is extradited from Dubai, where he was arrested three days earlier
- 20 December - The Supreme Court of the Netherlands upheld a lower court's ruling in the Urgenda Foundation v State of the Netherlands climate case

== Deaths ==
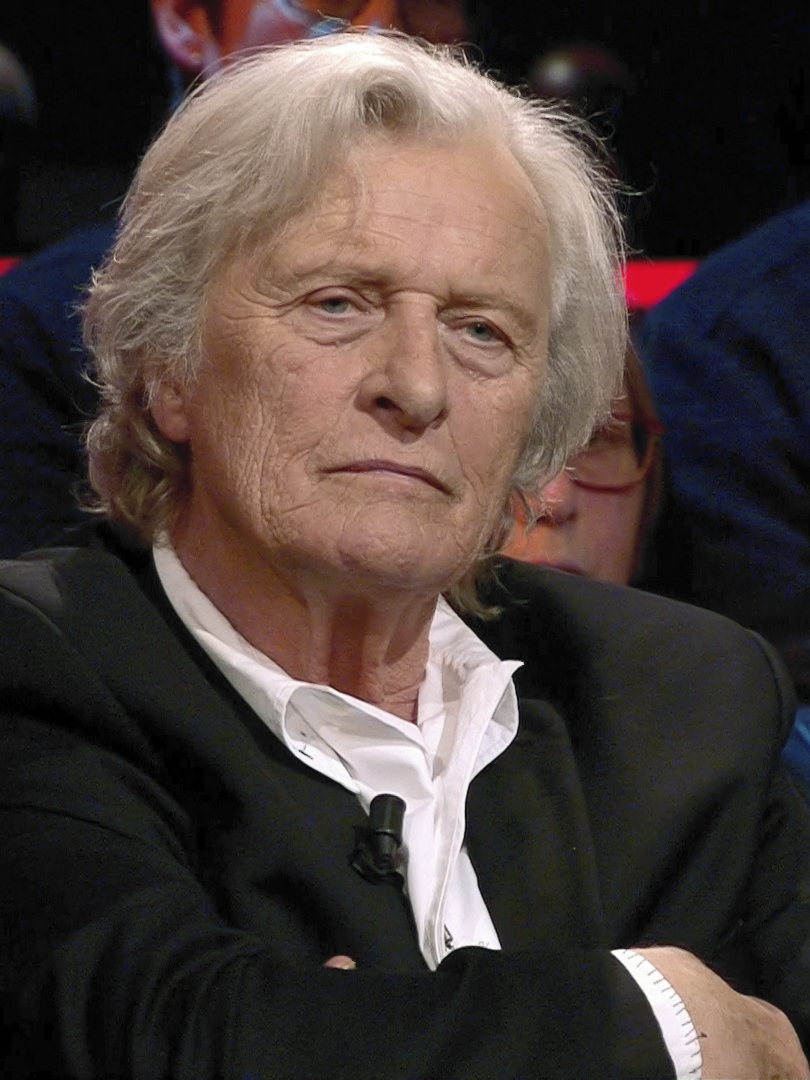
Rutger Hauer in 2018

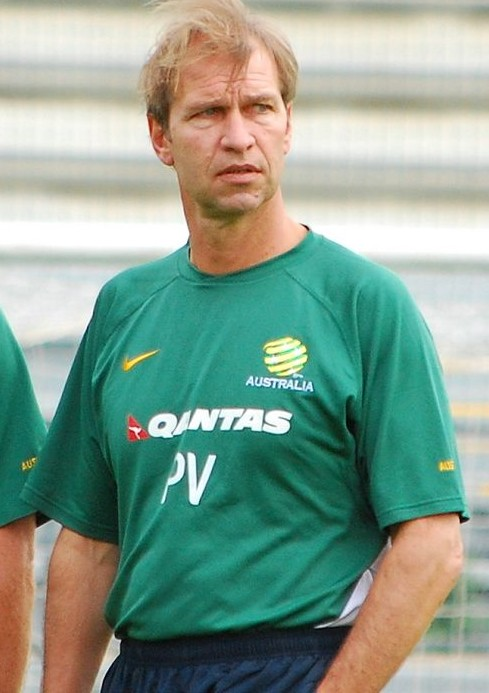
Pim Verbeek in September 2008

=== January ===
- 1 January – Feis Ecktuh, Dutch rapper (b. 1986)
- 2 January – Paulien van Deutekom, Dutch speed skater (b. 1981)
- 18 January – Cees Haast, Dutch cyclist (b. 1938)
- 22 January – Koos Andriessen, Dutch politician (b. 1928)
- 23 January – Dick Dolman, Dutch politician (b. 1935)
- 28 January – Jurrie Koolhof, Dutch footballer and manager (b. 1960)
- 31 January – Johnny Lion, Dutch singer and actor (b. 1941)

=== February ===
- 16 February – Kees Stoop, Dutch artist (b. 1929)

=== March ===
- 6 March – Lotte van der Zee, Dutch model (b. 1999)
- 22 March – Frans Andriessen, Dutch politician (b. 1929)

=== April ===
- 11 April – Max van Weezel, Dutch journalist (b. 1951)
- 17 April – Pieter Verhoeff, Dutch film director (b. 1938)
- 23 April – Johan Witteveen, Dutch politician and economist, Deputy Prime Minister (b. 1921)
- 26 April – Robbert de Greef, Dutch cyclist (b.1991)

=== May ===
- 15 May – Peer Mascini, Dutch actor and writer (b. 1941)

=== June ===
- 17 June – Clemens C. J. Roothaan, Dutch chemist and physicist, developer of Roothaan equations (b. 1918)

=== July ===
- 19 July – Rutger Hauer, Dutch actor, writer, and environmentalist (b. 1944)

=== August ===
- 16 August – Princess Christina of the Netherlands, Princess of the Netherlands (b. 1947)

=== September ===
- 18 September – Fernando Ricksen, Dutch professional footballer (b. 1976)

=== November ===
- 28 November – Pim Verbeek, Dutch footballer and manager (b. 1956)

=== December ===
- 4 December – Peter van Walsum, Dutch diplomat (b. 1934)

== See also ==
- 2019 European Parliament election
