= 1934 in the Netherlands =

- Decades: 1910s; 1920s; 1930s; 1940s; 1950s
- See also: Other events of 1934; History of the Netherlands

Events in the year 1934 in the Netherlands.

== Incumbents ==
- Monarch: Wilhelmina
- Prime Minister: Hendrikus Colijn

== Events ==
- 1 September – The Netherlands education minister, Henri Marchant, accepts the "Kollewijn" proposals for standardizing the spelling of the Dutch language.
- unknown date – The Netherlands Antilles national football team (as Curaçao) plays its first international match, against Suriname

== Films ==
- Bleeke Bet, directed by Alex Benno and Richard Oswald
- Op Hoop van Zegen, directed by Alex Benno and based on a play by Herman Heijermans

== Births ==
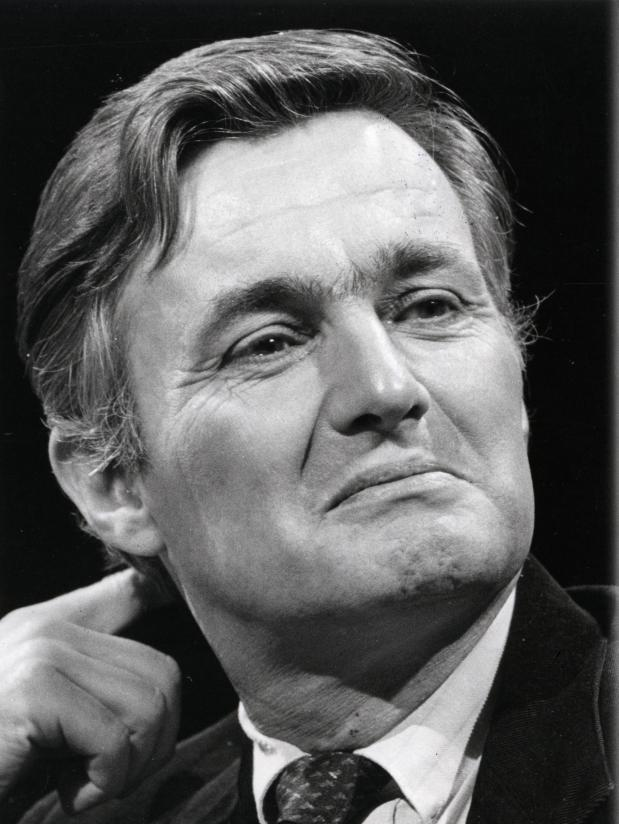
Piet Dankert

- 5 January – Eddy Pieters Graafland, football goalkeeper (d. 2020)
- 8 January – Piet Dankert, politician (d. 2003)
- 16 August – Ed van Thijn, politician (d. 2021)
- 25 October – Simon Groot, agronomist (d. 2025)
- 28 October – Martin van der Borgh, cyclist (d. 2018)
- 30 October – Frans Brüggen, musician (d. 2014)
- 19 December – Rudi Carrell, singer and entertainer (d. 2006)

== Deaths ==
- 10 January – Marinus van der Lubbe, communist convicted of setting fire to the Reichstag (executed) (b. 1909)
- 20 March – Emma of Waldeck and Pyrmont, former queen consort and regent (b. 1858)
- 12 August – Hendrik Petrus Berlage, architect (b. 1856)
- 29 October – Lou Tellegen, actor (b. 1881)
- 20 November – Willem de Sitter, mathematician, physicist and astronomer (b. 1872)
