= Pierik =

Pierik may refer to:

== Places ==
- Pierik, Netherlands, a region in Overijsse, Zwolle, the Netherlands

== Surname ==
- Annie Schreijer-Pierik (born 1953), Dutch politician
- Cor Pierik (born 1965), Dutch politician
- Eric Pierik (born 1959), Dutch field hockey player
- John Pierik (1949–2018), Dutch Olympic shooter
