= 2015 in the Netherlands =

- Decades: 1990s; 2000s; 2010s; 2020s
- See also: Other events of 2015; History of the Netherlands

This article lists some of the events from 2015 related to the Netherlands.

== Incumbents ==
- Monarch – Willem-Alexander
- Prime Minister – Mark Rutte (VVD)
- Speaker of the House of Representatives – Anouchka van Miltenburg (VVD, resigned on 12 December), Khadija Arib (PvdA, Acting Speaker)
- President of the Senate – Ankie Broekers-Knol (VVD)

== Events ==
=== January ===
- 8 January: After the Charlie Hebdo shooting, over 18,000 demonstrators for freedom of speech joined events around the Netherlands, following the call of the Mayors of Amsterdam, Rotterdam, Utrecht and others; many Dutch Government members joined the demonstrations
- 29 January: A man holding a fake gun tried to take over the Nederlandse Omroep Stichting (NOS) news studio in Hilversum because he wanted to tell the audience about a conspiracy theory of his; he was arrested later that evening by the police without hurting anyone.

=== February ===
- 2 February: Opening of the Barneveld Zuid railway station
- 9 February: The political party Denk is founded by MPs Tunahan Kuzu and Selçuk Öztürk
- 12–15 February: The 2015 World Single Distance Speed Skating Championships take place in the Thialf Arena in Heerenveen

=== March ===
- 15 March: Ivo Opstelten and Fred Teeven (VVD) resign from the Ministry of Security and Justice.
- 18 March: Provincial and Water board elections are held.

=== April ===
- 18 April: PSV Eindhoven wins the 2014–15 Eredivisie

=== May ===
- 12 May: Jesse Klaver takes over as Leader of GroenLinks

=== June ===
- 9 June: Senate election, 2015

=== August ===
- 19–23 August: SAIL Amsterdam

=== September ===
- 8 September: The VU University Medical Center in Amsterdam is fully evacuated after parts of the hospital were flooded because of a burst in a major water pipeline

=== October ===
- 6 October: Locals demonstrate in Oranje, Drenthe to oppose the instalment an asylum seekers centre in the village
- 14–18 October: Amsterdam Dance Event

=== December ===
- 16 December: Around 2,000 people protested and rioted against plans announced by the town council to construct a centre for 1,500 asylum seekers in the 2015 Geldermalsen riot.
- 31 December: Vroom & Dreesmann was declared bankrupt.

== See also ==
- 2014–15 Eredivisie
- Netherlands in the Eurovision Song Contest 2015
- Netherlands in the Junior Eurovision Song Contest 2015
- List of Dutch Top 40 number-one singles of 2015

== See also ==
- 2015 in Dutch television
- 2014–15 Eredivisie
