= 2020 in the Netherlands =

- Decades: 2000s; 2010s; 2020s
- See also: Other events of 2020; History of the Netherlands

Events from the year 2020 in the Netherlands.

== Incumbents ==
- Monarch: Willem-Alexander
- Prime Minister: Mark Rutte
- Speaker of the House of Representatives: Khadija Arib
- President of the Senate: Jan Anthonie Bruijn

== Ongoing ==
- COVID-19 pandemic in the Netherlands

== Events ==
=== March ===
- 19 March – Medical Care Minister Bruno Bruins (VVD) resigns because of exhaustion in the midst of the COVID-19 pandemic. Martin van Rijn, a former State Secretary for Health, Welfare and Sport for the Labour Party, is appointed to temporarily succeed him as an Independent; Tamara van Ark (VVD) takes over on 9 July.
- 21 March – Tunahan Kuzu resigns as Leader of Denk, triggering an internal crisis. Farid Azarkan succeeds him on 26 September.

=== April ===
- 30 April – Forum for Democracy (FvD) forms a coalition with the Christian Democratic Appeal (CDA) and People's Party for Freedom and Democracy (VVD) in North Brabant. It is the first time the party could be formally part of a regional authority.

=== May ===
- 3 May – Henk Krol and Femke Merel van Kooten found the short-lived Party for the Future (PvdT), led by Representative Henk Krol and chaired by Senator Henk Otten. It was dissolved the following 18 October and succeeded by Group Otten and the Henk Krol List.
- 12 – 16 May – The Eurovision Song Contest 2020 was scheduled to be held in Rotterdam, but was cancelled because of the COVID-19 outbreak. Eurovision: Europe Shine A Light takes place in Hilversum instead.
- 22 May – Hooghalen train crash.

=== June ===
- 1 June – A Black Lives Matter protest on Dam Square is authorised by Amsterdam Mayor Femke Halsema but authorities fail to enforce COVID-19 social distancing rules, prompting calls for her resignation.

=== July ===
- 1 July – Jan van Zanen (VVD) succeeds Johan Remkes (VVD) as Mayor of the Hague. Peter den Oudsten (PvdA) becomes Acting Mayor of Utrecht; Sharon Dijksma (PvdA) succeeds him on 16 December.
- 15 July – Deputy Prime Minister Hugo de Jonge defeats Pieter Omtzigt for the position of Leader of the Christian Democratic Appeal.
- 20 July – A Royal Netherlands Navy NHIndustries NH90 helicopter crashes in the Caribbean Sea near Aruba. Two officers aboard are killed.

=== September ===
A group of Dutch officials demanded answers from Pete Hoekstra the United States Ambassador to the Netherlands in response to reports that he had hosted a fund-raising event at the U.S. embassy for the far-right Dutch political party Forum for Democracy, a potential violation of international law. This is not the first time Hoekstra has been associated with the far-right party. In May 2020, Hoekstra was interviewed by the leader of the party's video channel and he was also a guest speaker at the party's conference November 2019.

- 4 September
  - Sigrid Kaag becomes Leader of the Democrats 66.
  - Geert Wilders party leader of Party for Freedom and anti Islam activist is cleared of inciting hatred by a court.

=== October ===
- 1 October – Marjan Rintel is set to succeed Roger van Boxtel as CEO of Nederlandse Spoorwegen (NS). Ina Adema is set to succeed Wim van de Donk as the King's Commissioner of North Brabant.

=== November ===
- 20 November – Joseph "Jos" Brech is convicted of the kidnapping and sexual abuse that led to the death of Nicky Verstappen in 1998.

=== December ===
- 1 December – After a long discussion, Buba (elephant) could stay in the Netherlands.

== Deaths ==
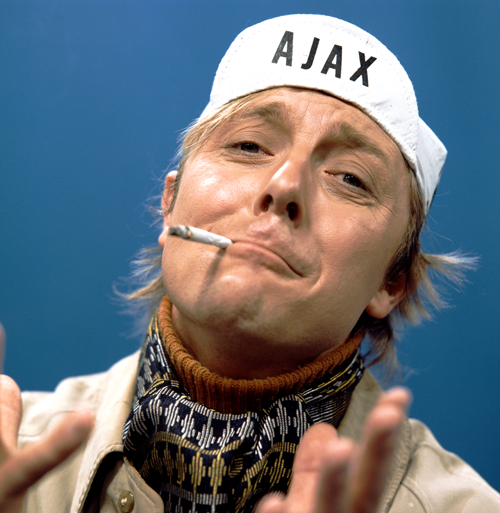
Aart Staartjes

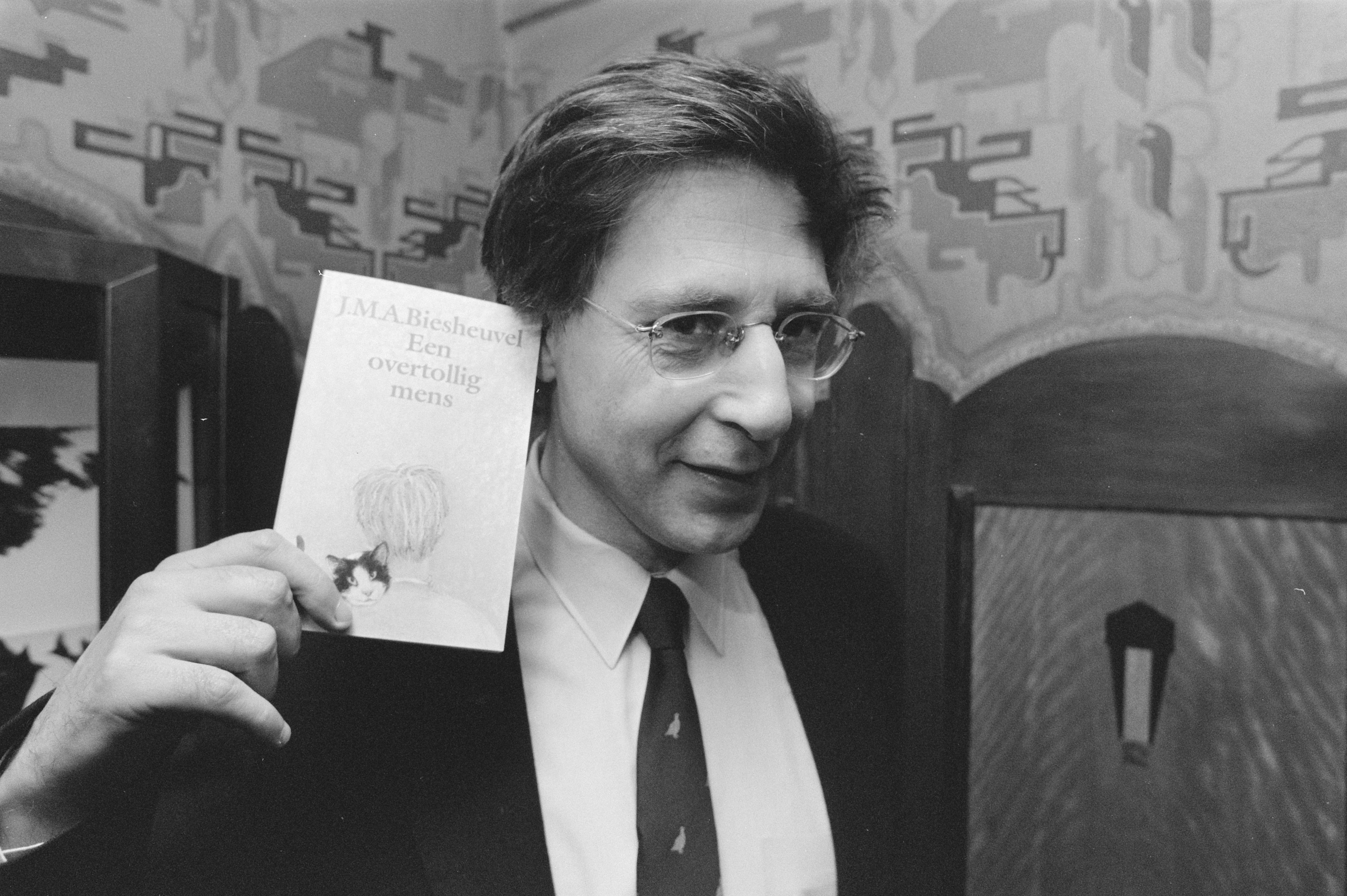
Maarten Biesheuvel

=== January ===
- 1 January – Jaap Schröder, violinist and conductor (b. 1925).
- 9 January – Rudolf de Korte, Dutch politician, Deputy Prime Minister, 1986–1989, Minister of Economic Affairs, 1986–1989 (b. 1936).
- 12 January – Aart Staartjes, actor (De Stratemakeropzeeshow, Sesamstraat, Pinkeltje) and television presenter (b. 1938).
- 24 January – Rob Rensenbrink, Dutch footballer (b. 1947).

=== February ===
- 29 February – Herman Redemeijer, Dutch politician (b. 1930).

=== July ===
- 10 July – Lara van Ruijven, Dutch speed skater (b. 1992).
- 30 July – Maarten Biesheuvel, Dutch writer (b. 1939).

=== August ===
- 25 August – Cora Canne Meijer, Dutch mezzo-soprano and voice teacher (b. 1929).

=== December ===
- 19 December - Bram van der Vlugt, Dutch actor.
