= Hermann Friedrich Kohlbrugge =

Dutch minister

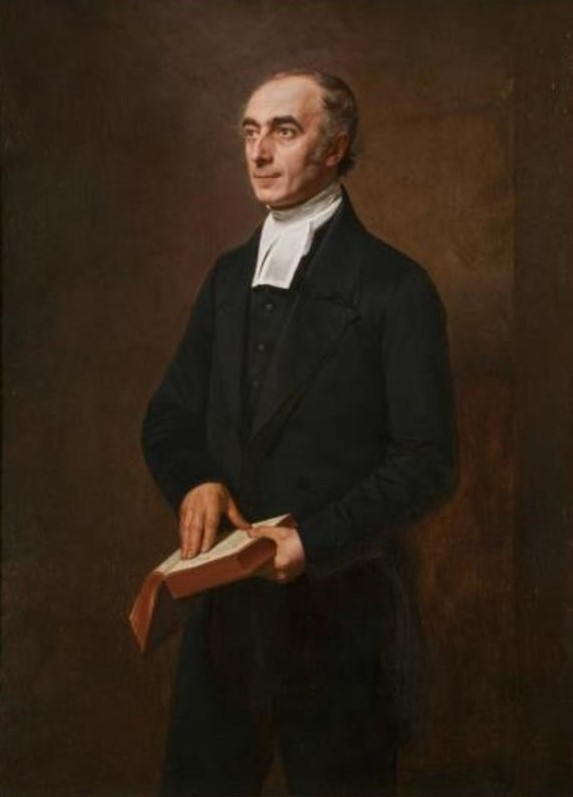
- Portrait of Hermann Friedrich Kohlbrugge by Julius Roeting (Museum Catharijneconvent)
- Born: August 3, 1803; Amsterdam
- Died: March 5, 1875 (aged 71); Elberfeld
- Other name: Hermann Friedrich Kohlbrügge
- Occupation: Theologian
- Relatives: Hebe Charlotte Kohlbrugge (great-granddaughter)

Hermann Friedrich Kohlbrugge, or Kohlbrügge (August 15, 1803, Amsterdam – March 5, 1875, Elberfeld) was a Dutch minister and reformed theologian born to a German father. He was considered by many theologians like Karl Barth and Oepke Noordmans as one of the greatest theologians of the 19th century.

== Life ==
=== Early life ===
Hermann Friedrich Kohlbrugge grew up in Amsterdam. His father was a native German and he and his family attended the Restored Evangelical Lutheran Church in the Netherlands, a secession of the Evangelical Lutheran Church. Kohlbrugge's mother belonged originally to the Dutch Reformed Church, the national Reformed Church of the Netherlands (Nederlands Hervormde Kerk), which was until 1795 protected and supported by the government.

=== Study and conversion ===
Kohlbrugge excelled at school and was allowed to the study of Arts at the University of Utrecht. Soon after his father died, he fulfilled a promise to his father and committed to studying theology. Kohlbrugge eventually graduated and wrote a dissertation on Psalm 45, calling this Psalm a wedding song for Christ and his people. As a student, he came under the influence of the reigning cultural and theological climate which was mainly liberal. He had the “pleasure to undermine the holiest truths of Christian religion and to mock with conversion and living faith.” But:

God Himself intervened in his life in a powerful way, turning him away from his ungodly life and teaching him in the school of grace. Kohlbrugge himself said of it, “It pleased the Almighty God to draw me through His Holy Spirit effectually and irresistibly to Himself and to reveal His Son in me.” For Kohlbrugge this meant that he had to give up all efforts to save himself. He cast himself into God's gracious arms.

Later he wrote about his conversion:

Power I have not to save myself; I found no power in myself to keep God's commandments. No matter how much I tried to attain it, I found no power in myself to turn myself to God; no power to utter a single cry; no power to break with just one small sin, weak as the web of a spider or as a thread that has been perished; no power to resist the world and its indignity; and there where I was without power I have experienced that the Lord is the power of all his people ... I have never been strong but in the Lord. Glad I have never been, but in the gladness of the Lord.

=== Kohlbrugge and the church ===
At the time he was allowed to preach as an assistant minister of the Restored Evangelical Lutheran Church of Amsterdam, he stumbled upon a great difference between the sermons of his colleague preachers and the Reformed tradition. In 1826 Kohlbrugge objected to the fact that his Lutheran colleague, Rev. D.R. Uckermann, did not affirm in clear terms the total depravity of man and the necessity of regeneration by the Holy Spirit. This caused him to make a protest, eventually leading to the Lutheran church discharging Kohlbrugge. Afterwards Kohlbrugge tried to enroll in the Dutch Reformed Church. He was refused admission to that church, because the Synod feared he would raise protests there as well. After these conflicts with two denominations and the early loss of his wife, Kohlbrugge moved to Germany and was permitted to preach there in 1833. After permission to the German church was refused him as well, he returned to Holland where he lived without being a member of any denomination; but he wrote books and had church services of his own in his house.

In 1847, Kohlbrugge received a "religious patent" from the Prussian monarch to form a new denomination consisting of a single congregation, the "Niederländisch-Refomirte Gemeine" (Dutch Reformed Church) in Elberfeld; he lived there with his second wife and his children until his death in 1875. In 1857, the Synod of the Dutch Reformed Church decided to allow foreign pastors to preach in domestic churches at the invitation of local congregations. The synodical decision allowed Kohlbrugge legally to preach again in the Netherlands.

=== Later life ===
In 1871 Kohlbrugge was invited by Abraham Kuyper, by then still a minister in the Dutch Reformed Church, to preach in the Zuiderkerk (South Church) in Amsterdam. For Kohlbrugge this felt as a rehabilitation. Although only a few hundred visitors were expected more than 3000 people came to the church to listen to him.

Kohlbrugge died in 1875 in Eberfeld. One of the sayings of Kohlbrugge recorded on his deathbed was, “My dear children, hold fast to the simple Heidelberg Catechism.”

== Theology ==
=== The discovery of the comma ===
In 1833, during the preparation of one of his sermons in Elberfeld, Germany, Kohlbrugge stumbled upon Romans 7:14 where Paul states: "For we know that the law is spiritual, but I am carnal, sold under sin". Suddenly the second comma struck him:

I am carnal, sold under sin.

Until then Kohlbrugge had thought that a believer is sold under sin insofar as he is still carnal. Now he realised that Paul wrote that he, a converted apostle, remains carnal, sold under the sin. For Kohlbrugge this insight was a second conversion. In the sermon (which became known as the 'comma-sermon') he said:

Throw away all your crutches of sanctification, far away from you. It is impossible, with them, to climb upon mount Zion. Rip off the rags wherewith you cover your wounds and show yourself as you really are, to him who is holy and just – Hear what the Scripture says: "(God) who justifies – not those who love, not the saints, the just, the pious, no, no – the ungodly." The Apostle testified not: "I made reasonable progress in sanctification." No, but despite his Pharisaic past, and to console his distressed heart he writes down: "For we know that the law is spiritual, but I am carnal, sold under sin" – Christ knows to sanctify us only in this way, when we confess: "I am carnal and black." His Word is true above all other things: "I see no stains in you, just in this way you are lovely and holy in Me."

The result of all human efforts is, according to Kohlbrugge, unbelief:

There are many Christians who believe that sanctification is their work after they have been justified. They are diligently committed to it. But instead of advancing, they become more and more aware that they are going backwards, they become mindless like a withered tree. Unbelief sets in. Satan gets his hands dirty here and now before they even suspect it, everything becomes dark for them. The corruption that is in their hearts shows itself more and more, and now they asks themselves if they have ever received grace, and they are questioning and denying the whole work of God.

This view became a guiding principle for Kohlbrugge's theology.

=== Kohlbrugge and the sanctification of the sinner ===
Like Luther and Calvin Kohlbrugge preached the total depravity of human nature. Even our most holy works and our deepest piety are stained with sin and self-righteousness. One of the most essential parts of sanctification is the admission of our inability. In Kohlbrugge's theology the sanctification of the sinner always rests in the justification: sanctification becomes in the first place an acknowledgement that we are sinners and that we need Christ. This theology, he claimed, is exactly what Paul, Luther, and Calvin preached and what can be found in his beloved Heidelberg Catechismus. A commentator wrote:

One of Kohlbrugge's objections against later reformed orthodoxy was that it tended to separate sanctification and justification more than the first Reformers. The first Reformers always returned from sanctification to justification. For them, justification was more than just an act. They stressed that the consolation of justification is received by the believer every time he puts faith in Christ. This emphasis we find also in the writings of Kohlbrugge.

Kohlbrugge's theology was strictly Christocentric. He opposed a number of important theological positions in his time. The first of these is the quest for a kind of synthesis between culture and gospel (Vermittlung). The second was the concern of the Dutch pietists and puritans for the conversion history of the believers, on the basis of which the authenticity and status of the faith were determined. According to Kohlbrugge, in both positions one is focused on the (goodness of) man, instead of on (the goodness of) Christ. In man there is no natural goodness, he depends on Christ alone.

Kohlbrugge was close to Luther in his theology. Kohlbrugge kept faith and rebirth together. Herein he differed profoundly from the representatives of the Further Reformation. Kohlbrugge did not emphasize rebirth in a narrower sense, as a form of vivification. He emphasized faith, which is justifying in nature. Sanctification is not a growth process of the Christian, a new principle, like Abraham Kuyper claimed. This will lead to a human activism. In himself, the believer is and remains a fallen man who is completely dependent on the grace that is available in Christ, through faith alone.

== Reception ==
=== Nineteenth century ===
During his life Kohlbrugge was a source of misunderstanding and controversy. He sometimes preached this gospel so radically that a lot of his fellow theologians and ministers strongly objected to him, accusing him of either ignoring the scientific and moral gains of the Enlightenment, or ignoring and refusing God's law and the sanctification of the believer. The German theologian Albrecht Ritschl did not want to spend more time on "the strange thoughts of this man". Kohlbrugge's friend the poet and historian Isaäc da Costa, one of the central figures of the Dutch Réveil, accused him unjustly in an open letter of antinomianism and "of being in conflict with the teaching of the Heidelberg Catechism, which speaks of the necessary knowledge of three parts: our misery, deliverance, and gratitude. In his view, Kohlbrugge did not teach the necessity of the third part, the life of gratitude." The Dutch theologian and minister S. Gerssen wrote:

Kohlbrugge was not an epigone of Luther or Calvin; he was reformed beyond a doubt, but with a Lutheran streak. The essence of the Reformed Reformation was voiced by him, but Luther was his favorite and most read throughout his life. That uniqueness has not made life easy for him; the last century hardly knew what to do with him. He was too intolerant for the Lutheran congregation, in the rather pietistic Wuppertal he was too resolute, he was too determined for the sluggish Reformed Church of those days, but too broad for the Secession again, too much connected with the whole people and the whole Church. Hence this man, who could not live without a pulpit, was driven from one pulpit to another.

=== Twentieth century and later ===
The true rehabilitation of Kohlbrugge's thought came in the twentieth century. In the Theology of the Nineteenth Century, Karl Barth argued that, while Kolhbrugge remained relatively unknown, he was in reality the only nineteenth century theologian whose "greatness" merited comparison to the Protestant reformers: "More forcefully than anyone before and after him in the nineteenth century, Kohlbrugge brought reformed theology back onto the scene, thus reminding protestantism of its origin, of its essence." The great Dutch theologian Oepke Noordmans wrote that Kohlbrugge deserved "without any doubt a place among the classics of the Church" and that he "found accents that can compete with and sometimes surpass Luther's mighty talent". Kornelis Heiko Miskotte wrote that Kohlbrugge "more than Kierkegaard and Kutter has that curious tone of paradoxical certainty, which feels so beneficial to us in Luther." The German theologian Dietrich Bonhoeffer referred positively in his "Nachfolge" (1937) to Kohlbrugge. Cornelis Graafland wrote that for many Kohlbrugge "meant a discovery and liberation" and a "second conversion." For the theologian Pieter de Vries "Kohlbrugge became in his teaching, a real comforter to mourners, an encourager of those who struggled with their own sinfulness and weakness." Kohlbrugge's sermons and writings are a breath of fresh air, a refreshment, an oasis. Other theologians have also stressed that Kohlbrugge was a liberation for many believers: "We have met many people, sometimes also young people, who have personally experienced this. Who were led by Kohlbrugge from the service houses in which they sometimes sighed for years."

Nowadays Kohlbrugge's sermons are widely read and admired by a wide range of Protestants: by modern puritans and pietists.

== Writings ==
Kohlbrugge wrote no large dogmatic or exegetical works. His theology is to be found in his sermons (leerredenen).

- Hermann Friedrich Kohlbrugge (1886). Kleiner Katechismus, oder kurzgefasste Form der Lehre nach dem Heidelberger Katechismus. Könker. pp. 38.
