= 2016 in the Netherlands =

This article lists some of the events from 2016 related to the Netherlands.

== Incumbents ==
- Monarch: Willem-Alexander
- Prime Minister: Mark Rutte (VVD)
- Speaker of the House of Representatives: Khadija Arib (PvdA)
- President of the Senate: Ankie Broekers-Knol (VVD)

== Events ==
- 29 January: the Netherlands join the American-led intervention in the Syrian Civil War
- February: plastic contaminates chocolate manufactured at a Mars Nederland factory in Veghel
- 23 February: Dalfsen train crash, one dead
- 1 March: official inauguration of the new seat of the Supreme Court of the Netherlands in The Hague
- 28 March: special forces raid an apartment in Rotterdam and arrest four men suspected of plotting a terrorist attack
- 6 April: 2016 Dutch Ukraine–European Union Association Agreement referendum
- 12 April: Amsterdam Airport Schiphol is partially evacuated after a Polish drunk man indicated he was a terrorist
- 18 April: René Paas is appointed to be the King's Commissioner of Groningen
- 8 May: PSV Eindhoven wins the 2015–16 Eredivisie
- 15 May: Max Verstappen becomes the first Dutch F1-winner ever during the Spanish Grand Prix, after the crash of Lewis Hamilton and Nico Rosberg
- 6–10 July: the 2016 European Athletics Championships is held in Amsterdam
- 27 July: death of former Prime Minister Piet de Jong
- 26 August: opening of the Utrecht Vaartsche Rijn railway station
- 13 September: John Jorritsma takes over as Mayor of Eindhoven
- 22 September: Thierry Baudet founds the Forum for Democracy political party
- 19–23 October: Amsterdam Dance Event, Dutch DJ Martin Garrix wins DJ Mag's Top 100 first place
- 28 November–8 December: 2016 Labour Party leadership election won by Lodewijk Asscher
- 9 December: MP and Party for Freedom Leader Geert Wilders is found guilty of inciting racial discrimination
- 14 December: Sylvana Simons founds the political party Artikel 1

== Deaths ==
- 13 December – Hebe Charlotte Kohlbrugge, theologian (born 1914)

== See also ==
- 2015–16 Eredivisie
- List of Dutch Top 40 number-one singles of 2016
- 2016 in Dutch television
- Netherlands in the Eurovision Song Contest 2016
- Netherlands in the Junior Eurovision Song Contest 2016
