= 2016 in Dutch television =

This is a list of Dutch television related events from 2016.

== Events ==
- 29 January - Maan de Steenwinkel wins the sixth series of The Voice of Holland.
- 1 April - 13-year-old Esmée Schreurs wins the fifth series of The Voice Kids.
- 3 June - 18-year-old singer Nick Nicolai wins the 8th series of Holland's Got Talent.
- 8 June - Nina den Hartog wins the fifth series of Idols.

== Debuts ==
- 23 March - Idols (2002–2008, 2016–present)

== Television shows ==
=== 1950s ===
- NOS Journaal (1956–present)

=== 1970s ===
- Sesamstraat (1976–present)

=== 1980s ===
- Jeugdjournaal (1981–present)
- Het Klokhuis (1988–present)

=== 1990s ===
- Goede tijden, slechte tijden (1990–present)

=== 2000s ===
- X Factor (2006–present)
- Holland's Got Talent (2008–present)

=== 2010s ===
- The Voice of Holland (2010–present)

== Networks and services ==
=== Conversions and rebrandings ===
Old network name	New network name	Type	Conversion Date	Notes	Source
Djazz	Stingray Djazz	Cable television	Unknown		

=== Closures ===
Network	Type	End date	Notes	Sources
BBC Entertainment	Cable television	1 January		
13th Street	Cable television	1 July		
Syfy	Cable television	1 July		
Fox Life	Cable television	31 December		
HBO Netherlands	Cable television	31 December		

== Deaths ==
Date	Name	Age	Cinematic Credibility
31 May	Corry Brokken	83	Dutch singer & TV & radio presenter

== See also ==
- 2016 in the Netherlands
