= Hebe Charlotte Kohlbrugge =

Dutch theologian (1914–2016)

- Born: 8 April 1914; Utrecht, Netherlands
- Died: 13 December 2016 (aged 102); Utrecht, Netherlands
- Occupations: Theologian; Resistance member
- Theological work
- Tradition or movement: Protestant

Hebe Charlotte Kohlbrugge (8 April 1914 – 13 December 2016) was a Dutch Protestant theologian and Second World War resistance member. She was a member of the anti-Nazi Confessing Church for eleven months and assisted the reverend Günther Harder in Fehrbellin. Kohlbrugge was involved in spiritual resistance against Nazi Germany through the secret distribution of a pamphlet in the Netherlands and Switzerland during the Second World War. After the war, she worked as the secretary of the Germany Commission in the Council for Church and Government of the Dutch Reformed Church in 1947, holding responsibility for restoring ties with churches alongside Arend van Leeuwen in the Soviet-occupied East Germany and other Iron Curtain nations until 1989. Kohlbrugge gave students post-war ideology and enable Dutch students understand socialist ideals, sending theology students to Central Eastern Europe nations and more than 80 Dutch students spent one or two years studying. She was a recipient of the Bronze Lion and the American Medal of Freedom with the Silver Palm.

== Biography ==
On 8 April 1914, Kohlbrugge was born in Utrecht. She was the daughter of the chemist and teacher Hermann Kohlbrugge and the Lutheran Johanna Elisabeth Barner; Kohlbrugge was the youngest of five daughters and the great-granddaughter of the theologian Hermann Friedrich Kohlbrugge. She was of German descent through her parents. After graduating from high school with a diploma, she went on a one-year nursing course before moving to Norway to teach German (which she learnt by her family taking in German children during the First World War) to children.

Kohlbrugge went from Norway to England and became the au pair nurse of John Churchill, nephew of future wartime British Prime Minister Winston Churchill one week at their family's estate. In 1936, she travelled to Berlin and enrolled at the Seminar für kirchlichen Frauendienst to form her own opinion on the rise of the Nazi Party and Adolf Hitler after John Churchill praised the German regime. In May 1938, Kobhbrugge became available to the Confessing Church for eleven months, a group of anti-Nazi Protestant Christians who opposed persecution of the Jews. She worked as the assistant to the reverend Günther Harder in Fehrbellin before being arrested by the Gestapo and was briefly sent to prison in Potsdam for delivering sermons in a car to multiple Confessing Church pastors in Brandenburg. Kohlbrugge was later deported from Germany for refusing to perform the Nazi salute in front of two police officers, and avoided being sent to the Ravensbrück concentration camp in 1939. In mid-1939, she went to Switzerland to be taught theology by Karl Barth in Basel until the Second World War broke out in September 1939 and forced her to cease her studying.

In late 1940, Kohlbrugge became involved in the Lunterse Kring, which called for spiritual resistance against Nazi Germany through the secret distribution of the Bijna te laat pamphlet authored by the theologian Jan Koopmans to Jews in hiding across the occupied Netherlands, encouraging non-cooperation. She came into contact with Henk van Randwijk of the resistance magazine Vrij Nederland and began smuggling microfilms to neutral Switzerland for the Dutch government-in-exile in London. Kohlbrugge worked with fellow resistance members and was arrested on a train close to Antwerp on 4 April 1944 with a forged identity card in the name of Christine Doorman to endeavour to contract the Dutch government in London. She was sent to the Oranjehotel penal prison in Scheveningen, then to Herzogenbusch concentration camp and later Ravensbrück women's camp, where she faced death and ill health until the end of her sentence on 24 January 1945. Kohlbrugge was discharged from the camp and returned to the liberated Netherlands following a train journey to Berlin.

Following the war, she moved to Switzerland to recover from a case of tuberculosis. Kohlbrugge became secretary of the Germany Commission at the Council for Church and Government of the Dutch Reformed Church in 1947. She had responsibility for restoring ties with churches alongside Arend van Leeuwen in Soviet-occupied East Germany. Kohlbrugge also worked in other countries behind the Iron Curtain, and with the General Diaconal Council to establish the International Relief (World Diaconate) section from 1957 on the condition she continued to work in Eastern Europe. Although she received heavy opposition from the Communist authorities, Kohlbrugge was able to enter Eastern European cities in countries such as Czechoslovakia, East Germany, Hungary, Poland, Romania and Yugoslavia to provide students with post-war ideology and enable Dutch students understand socialist ideals. She sent theology students to Central Eastern Europe nations and more than 80 Dutch students spent one or two years studying. Kohlbrugge was deemed persona non grata in multiple Eastern Bloc countries, such as both Czechoslovakia and Hungary who expelled her in 1975.

She was a participant in the inaugural Christian Peace Conference in Prague in 1961 and was a Sunday guest with an elder who broadcast a sermon from her great-grandfather in Czech. Kohlbrugge stopped working for the World Diaconate in 1972 because she lost trust in the church's leadership; she continued working in Eastern Europe until 1989. In 2001, she delivered De islam aan de deur, an essay collection written by her sister. Kolhbrugge's autobiography, Tweemaal twee is vijf. Getuige in Oost en West, was published in 2002. In August 2009, Kohlbrugge and 80 other Protestant Church in the Netherlands members signed a letter advocating a dialogue with Islam with no obscuring the differences or detracting from Christianity's uniqueness. She heavily criticised Israel's policy towards the Palestinian people. Kohlbrugge's views were based on search and spent the final decade of her life researching the Bible and authored thousands of letters. She also talked to school classes about how she coped in Nazi concentration camps.

== Personal life ==
Kohlbrugge lived in the centre of Utrecht with her sister from the 1950s and alone following the latter's death in December 1999. She was admitted to the Diaconessenhuis in December 2016 with heart problems and died on the night of 13 to 14 December. Kohlbrugge did not marry. On 21 December, she was interred in the family grave in Amerongen.

== Awards ==
She received multiple awards for her wartime and church work. Kohlbrugge received the Bronze Lion in 1952, and the American Medal of Freedom with the Silver Palm from the United States Government two years later "for her role in the resistance". On 30 October 1975, she received the Joost van den Vondel Prize from the former West German president Gustav Heinemann in Münster "as a recognition for her pioneering work in bringing people and nations together." She was awarded an honorary doctorate in theology from the Charles University in Prague in May 1991 and from the Technical University of Cluj-Napoca in 1995.

In 2013, Kohlbrugge was given the Václav Benda Award in Prague for an individual "who fought for the freedom of the Czech Republic during the Second World War and under the communist regime." In 2019, Utrecht City Council directed its Street Naming Committee to name a street in the city after Kohlbrugge in an diversification street naming project and did so in February 2021 in the Merwedekanaalzone neighbourhood.
