= 2022 in the Netherlands =

- Decades: 2000s; 2010s; 2020s
- See also: Other events of 2022; History of the Netherlands

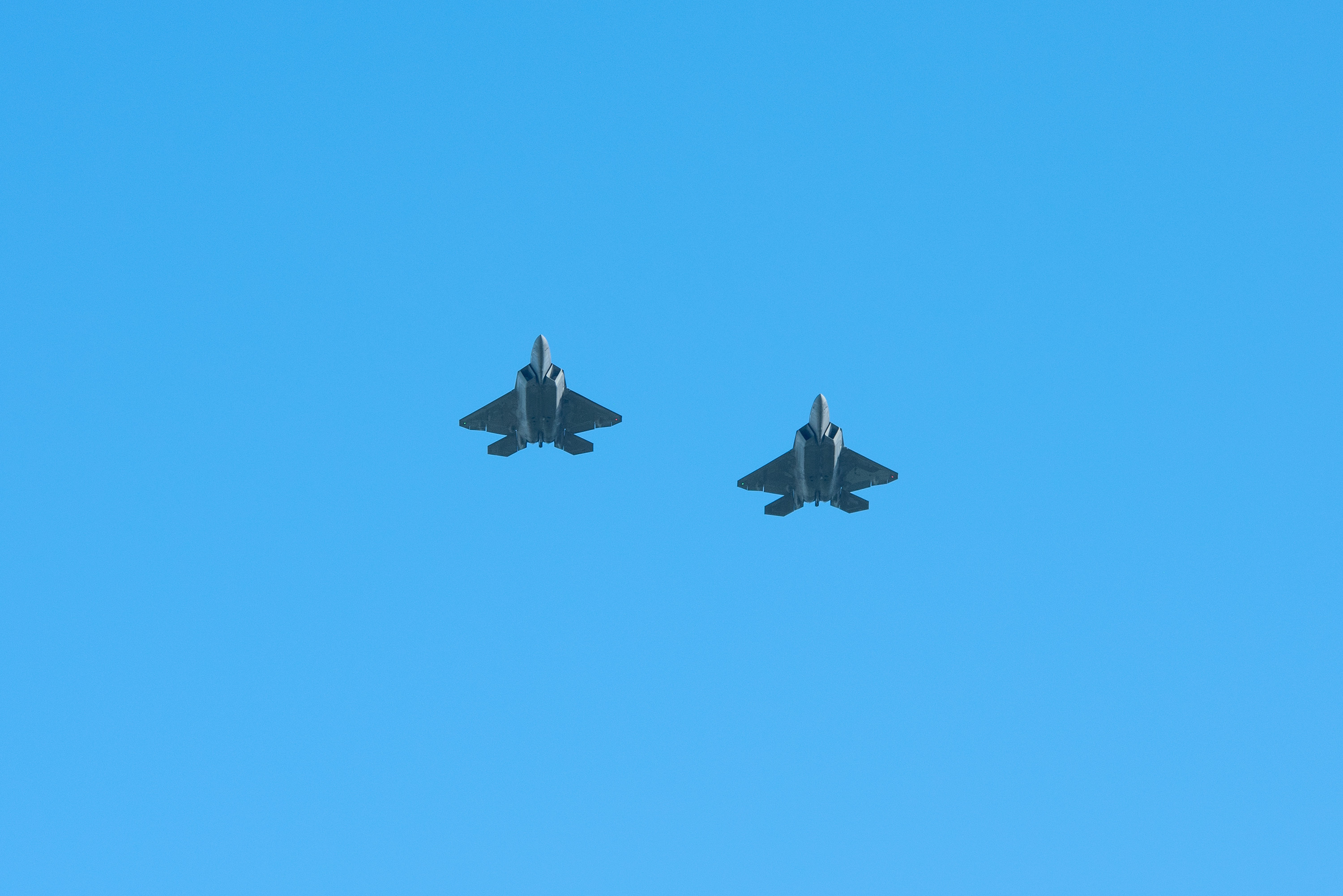
S. Air Force F-22 Raptors from the 90th Expeditionary Fighter Squadron arrived at Leeuwarden Air Base, Netherlands to conduct agile combat employment (ACE) and integrate with the Royal Netherlands Air Force, Oct. 16, 2022

Events from the year 2022 in the Netherlands.

== Incumbents ==
- Monarch: Willem-Alexander
- Prime Minister: Mark Rutte
- Speaker of the House of Representatives: Vera Bergkamp
- President of the Senate: Jan Anthonie Bruijn

== Ongoing ==
- COVID-19 pandemic in the Netherlands

== Events ==
=== January to March ===
- 5 January – The Netherlands reports a record 24,590 new cases of COVID-19 in the past 24 hours.
- 18 January – Hong Kong orders the culling of 2,000 small animals, such as hamsters, chinchillas and rabbits, closes pet shops, and sends 100 people to a quarantine camp after nearly a dozen hamsters imported from the Netherlands and sold at Little Boss pet shop were infected with the SARS-CoV-2 Delta variant which also spread to two people.
- 18 February – At least seventeen people are killed in Belgium, Germany, Ireland, the Netherlands, Poland and the United Kingdom as Storm Eunice impacts northwestern Europe. Millions are also left without power. The roof of the ADO Den Haag Stadium, in The Hague, the Netherlands, is severely damaged.
- 29 March – Belgium, the Netherlands, Ireland and the Czech Republic expel Russian diplomats due to the Russian invasion of Ukraine.

=== May to June ===
- 6 May – Two people are killed and three others are injured during a mass shooting at a care home in Molensingel, Alblasserdam, Netherlands. The perpetrator was already wanted for murdering a man at a shop yesterday.
- 18 May – the Netherlands welcomed the applications of Finland and Sweden to join NATO.
- 20 May – Belgium reports its first case of monkeypox.
- 16 June – Sergey Cherkasov, a Russian military intelligence official, is expelled from the Netherlands for attempting to begin an internship at the International Criminal Court in The Hague using a fake Brazilian identity. Cherkasov will now face a criminal trial in Brazil.
- 20 June – Dutch climate and energy minister Rob Jetten announces that the Netherlands will remove all restrictions on the operation of coal-fired power stations until at least 2024, in response to Russia's refusal to export natural gas to the country. Operations were previously limited to less than a third of the total production.
- 27 June – One person is killed and ten others injured after a tornado hits Zierikzee.

=== July to September ===
- 25 July – The Netherlands reports 106 new confirmed cases of monkeypox.
- 2 August – Mark Rutte becomes the longest-serving prime minister in Dutch history, overtaking Ruud Lubbers (1982–1994).
- 28 August – Six people are killed and seven others are injured after a truck crashes into a community barbecue in Nieuw-Beijerland, South Holland.
- 30 September – Inflation in the Netherlands increases to 17%, a record in decades, amid skyrocketing energy and fuel prices.

=== October to December ===
- 3 October – Piet Adema is appointed Minister of Agriculture, Nature and Food Quality.
- 25 October – The Dutch Ministry of Foreign Affairs confirms that two illegal Chinese police stations have operated in the Netherlands since 2018. One is in Rotterdam and the other is in Amsterdam.
- 27 October – The Ministry of Foreign Affairs of the Netherlands announces an investigation regarding the activities of China's two allegedly illegal police stations in the country.
- 17 November – Malaysia Airlines Flight 17: A court in the Netherlands sentences two Russians, Igor Strelkov-Girkin and Sergey Dubinsky, and a Ukrainian pro-Russian separatist Leonid Kharchenko to life imprisonment for shooting down the Malaysia Airlines flight over Donetsk Oblast, Ukraine in 2014. The verdict was delivered in absentia of the defendants.
