= Genemuiden =

- City
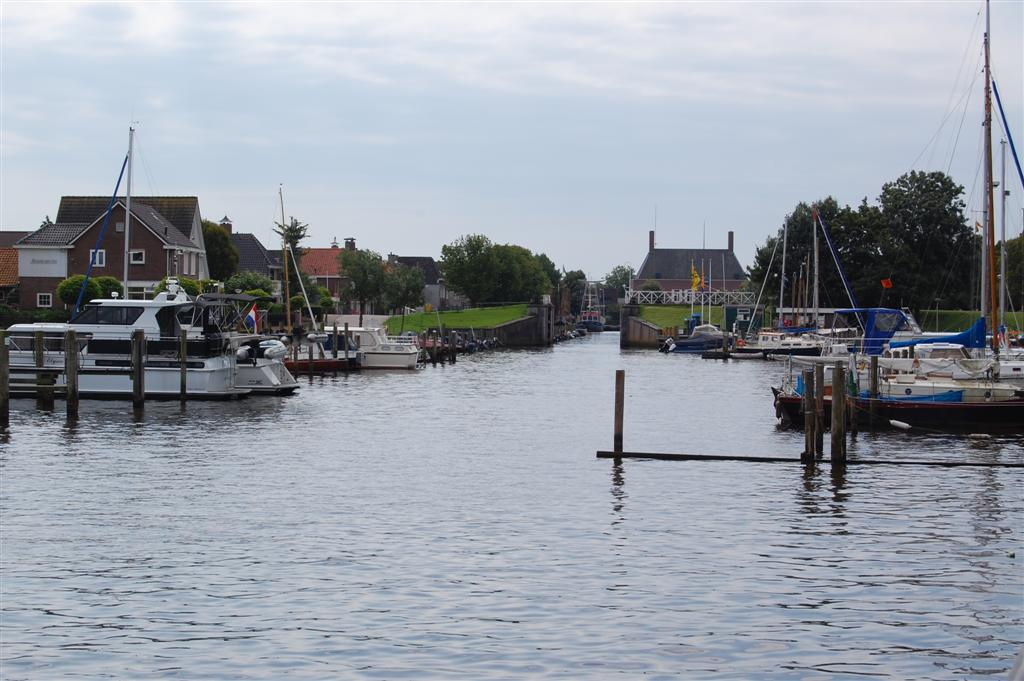
- The harbour entrance of Genemuiden in 2008

- Flag Coat of arms

- Location within Overijssel Location within Netherlands
- Coordinates: 52°37′28″N 6°2′23″E
- Country: Netherlands
- Province: Overijssel
- Municipality: Zwartewaterland

Area
  - Total: 12.08 km^{2} (4.66 sq mi)
- Elevation: 0 m (0 ft)

Population (2021)
  - Total: 9,700
  - Density: 800/km^{2} (2,100/sq mi)
- Time zone: UTC+1 (CET)
  - Summer (DST): UTC+2 (CEST)
- Postal code: 8281
- Dialing code: 038
- Website: Gemeente Zwartewaterland

Genemuiden is a city located in the north western part of the Province of Overijssel. It received city rights in 1275, which is also the first time Genemuiden gets mentioned in history.

It stayed independent up until 2001 when, despite fierce opposition of its inhabitants, it was forced to merge with the smaller, neighbouring villages of Zwartsluis and Hasselt to form the municipality of Zwartewaterland.

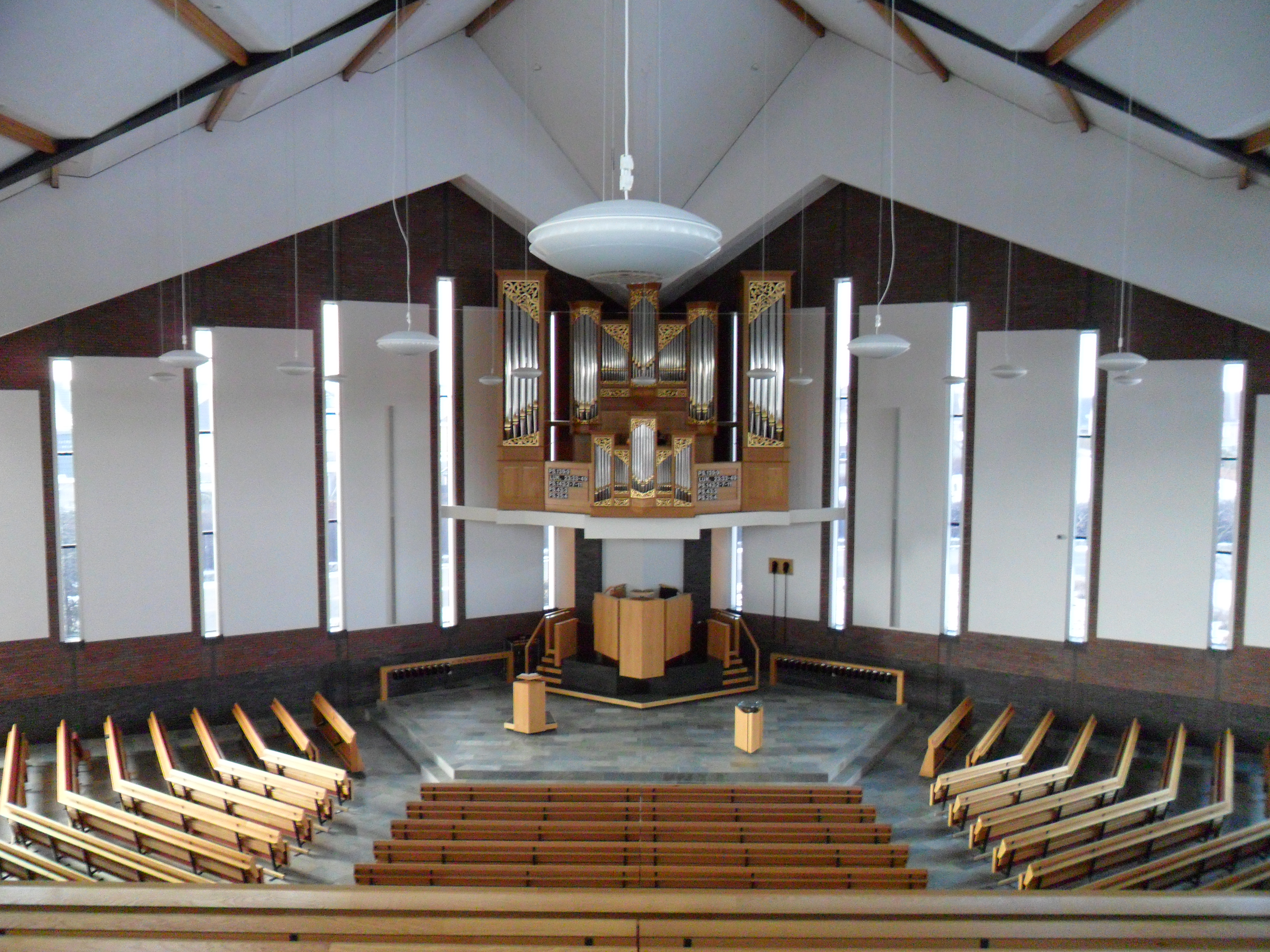
Church interior of the Reformed Congregation (Jachin en Boazkerk of Genemuiden.

The town itself doesn't have any buildings over 150 years old as two fires destroyed the town completely in 1866. These fires could not be controlled due to the great number of hay stacks in one street, 'de Achterweg' or 'Nachtweg'. This street still holds a non smoking sign, which is unique for a street in Europe.

Since the 18th century, the people from Genemuiden have been producing floor mats made of the bulrush that grows on the shores of the Zuiderzee. When the quality of the bulrush deteriorated in the 20th century, due to the change from salt water to fresh water (see Zuiderzee), the industry switched over to using coir imported from India to produce mats and carpets. In the sixties the first tufting machines were imported and currently Genemuiden is one of Europe's main production centres of tufted carpet and artificial grass.

Genemuiden is a Protestant stronghold, having five Reformed Protestant denominations and no Roman Catholic church. It's on the north-eastern tip of the so-called Dutch Bible Belt.

== Notable people ==
- Cor Pierik, politician
