= Jachin en Boazkerk, Genemuiden =

Church building in Netherlands, Netherlands

Jachin en Boazkerk
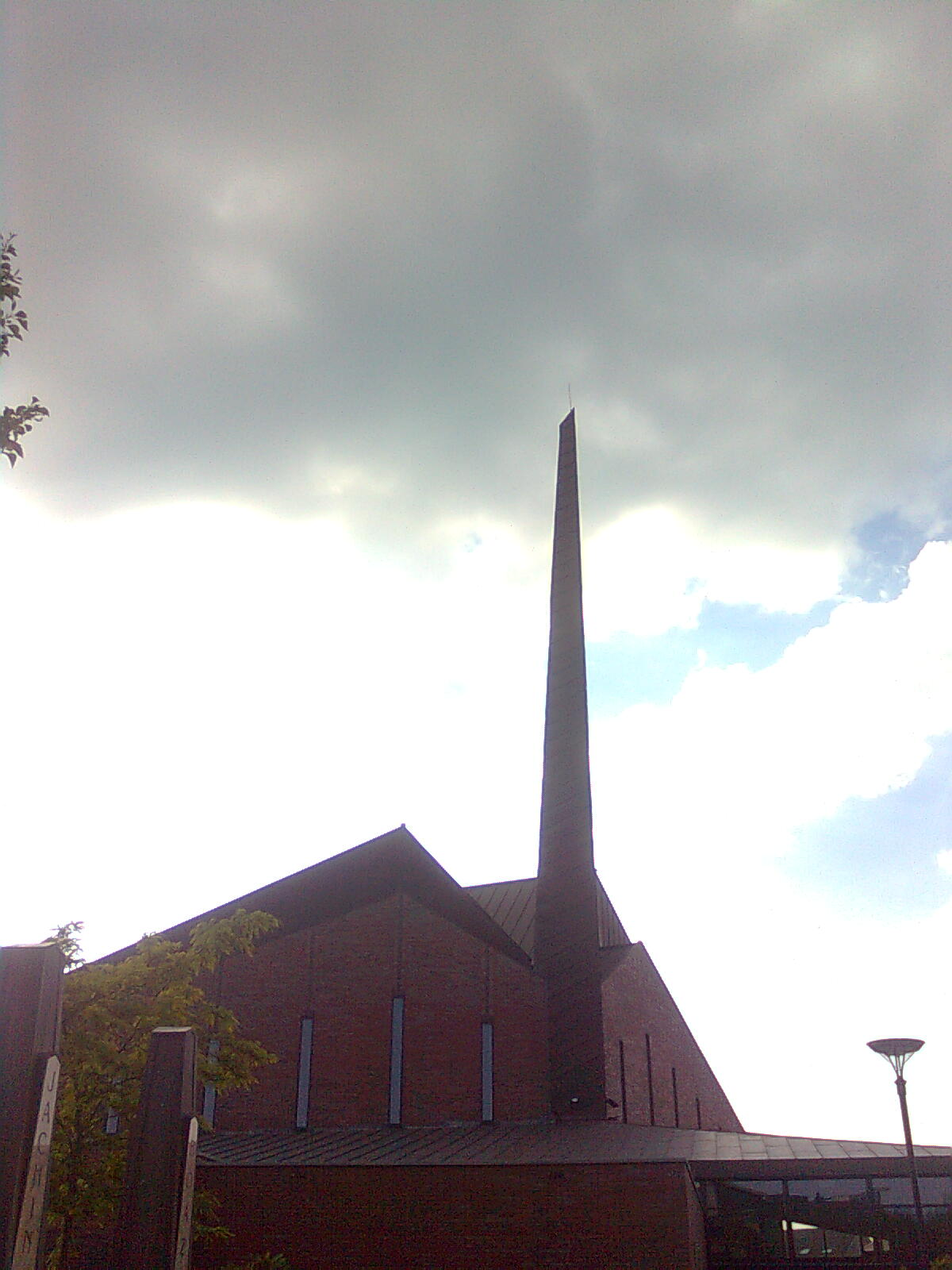
- The church in 2011

Religion
- Affiliation: Protestant, Netherlands Reformed Congregations
- Leadership: ds. C. Hogchem

Location
- Location: Netherlands
- Interactive map of Jachin en Boazkerk
- Coordinates: 52°37′0″N 6°2′0″E

Architecture
- Groundbreaking: 2002
- Completed: 2003
- Capacity: 1,850

The Jachin en Boazkerk is a church of the Netherlands Reformed Congregations in Genemuiden, Overijssel, the Netherlands. It was built in 2003, and can hold 1,850 people.
