= 2015 in Dutch television =

This is a list of Dutch television-related events in 2015.

== Events ==
- 29 January – Police arrest a fake gunman who disrupted the main evening bulletin on the news broadcaster NOS after he stormed into a studio and demanding airtime.
- 12 March – UK broadcaster ITV announces it has acquired the Dutch television production company Talpa Media for £355m.
- 11 April – 13-year-old Lucas van Roekel wins the fourth series of The Voice Kids.

== Television shows ==
=== 1950s ===
- NOS Journaal (1956–present)

=== 1970s ===
- Sesamstraat (1976–present)

=== 1980s ===
- Jeugdjournaal (1981–present)
- Het Klokhuis (1988–present)

=== 1990s ===
- Goede tijden, slechte tijden (1990–present)

=== 2000s ===
- X Factor (2006–present)
- Holland's Got Talent (2008–present)

=== 2010s ===
- The Voice of Holland (2010–present)

== Networks and services ==
=== Launches ===
Network	Type	Launch date	Notes	Source
SBS9	Cable television	1 January		
BBC First	Cable television	16 May		
DreamWorks Channel	Cable television	1 August		
RTL Z	Cable television	7 September		
Spike	Cable television	1 October		
Ziggo Sport	Cable television	12 November		

=== Conversions and rebrandings ===
Old network name	New network name	Type	Conversion Date	Notes	Source
Lite TV	Stingray Lite TV	Cable and satellite	17 December		

=== Closures ===
Network	Type	End date	Notes	Sources
Orange Sport	Cable and satellite	31 December		

== See also ==
- 2015 in the Netherlands
