= Julian Bushoff =

Dutch politician (born 1997)

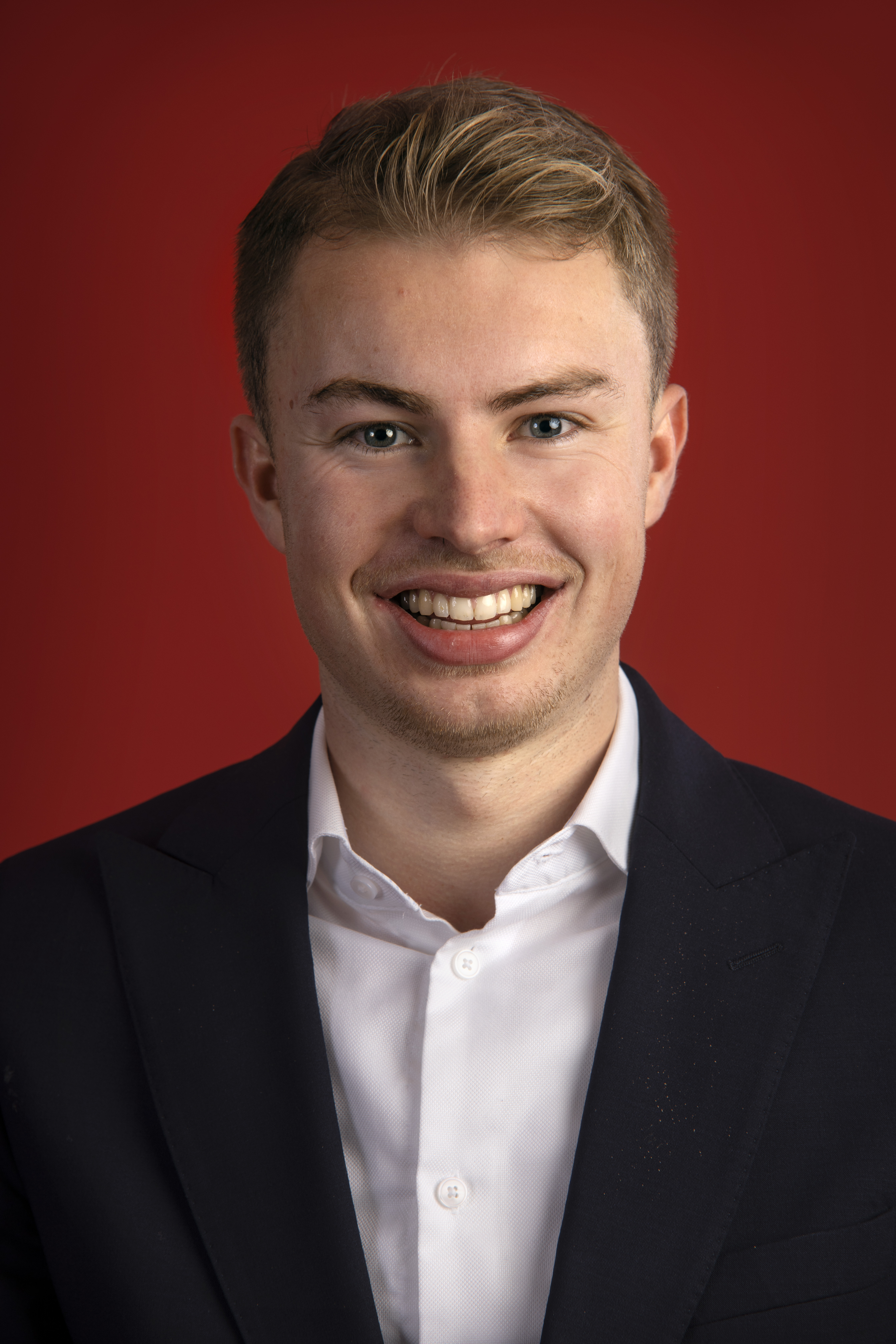
- Bushoff in 2020

Member of the House of Representatives
- Incumbent
- Assumed office 22 November 2022
- Preceded by: Khadija Arib

Personal details
- Born: Thomas Julian Bushoff; 21 March 1997 (age 29) Groningen, Netherlands
- Party: Labour Party (until 2026); PRO (from 2026)

Thomas Julian Bushoff (born 21 March 1997) is a Dutch politician from Progressief Nederland (PRO), and formerly of the Labour Party (PvdA). In 2022, he replaced Khadija Arib in the House of Representatives after she resigned, and he was re-elected in November 2023 on the shared GroenLinks–PvdA list. Bushoff's focus is on curative healthcare as well as the damage cause by induced earthquakes due to extraction from the Groningen gas field.

An amendment to the government's healthcare budget proposed by Bushoff was passed by the House in February 2024 that would appropriate €27 million towards establishing long COVID treatment centers. Minister of Health Ernst Kuipers had earlier refused to allocate any funds despite motions calling for such centers. Later that year, he wrote a bill with Daniëlle Jansen (NSC) that would allow the Netherlands Authority for Consumers and Markets (ACM) to investigate and block takeovers of medical providers with a revenue of less than €30 million. This authority already existed for larger companies. Bushoff called it unjust that healthcare funding ended up at private investors.

== Electoral history ==
Electoral history of Julian Bushoff
Year	Body	Party	Pos.	Votes	Result		Ref.
Year	Body	Party	Pos.	Votes	Party seats	Individual	Ref.
2021	House of Representatives	Labour Party	13	2,811	9	Lost (Note: Bushoff was appointed to the body later during the term due to a vacancy.)	
2023	House of Representatives	GroenLinks–PvdA	8	13,992	25	Won	
2025	House of Representatives	GroenLinks–PvdA	11	11,042	20	Won	
