= Eric Pierik =

Dutch field hockey player

Johannes Maria Henricus ("Eric" or "Erik") Pierik (born March 21, 1959, in Zwolle) is a former field hockey player from the Netherlands, who was a member of the Dutch National Team that finished sixth in the 1984 Summer Olympics in Los Angeles. Pierik earned a total number of 73 caps, scoring one goal, in the years 1980-1984. After the Los Angeles Games he retired from international competition.
