= Kees Stoop =

Dutch painter, illustrator, and etcher (1929–2019)

- Born: 19 March 1929; Werkendam, Netherlands
- Died: 16 February 2019 (aged 89)
- Education: Royal Academy of Fine Arts; Higher Institute for Fine Arts
- Known for: Painting, drawing, etching
- Website: www.keesstoop.nl

Kees Stoop (19 March 1929 in Werkendam – 16 February 2019) was a Dutch painter, illustrator and etcher.

Born in Werkendam, he studied at the Royal Academy of Fine Arts and the Higher Institute for Fine Arts in Antwerp in the 1950s where Professor Jos Hendrickx influenced the young artist greatly. Further inspiration was found in the works of Constant Permeke and Gustave De Smet. He lived and worked in Holten since the 1960s. Despite rarely exhibiting, his work received national recognition. 192 of his etchings and drawings are in the collection of the Rijksprentenkabinet Amsterdam, Rijksmuseum Twenthe (Enschede) and Museum More (Gorssel) have acquired several works.

Museum de Weem (Westeremden) of renown painter Henk Helmantel has an impressive collection.

In 2021, his book Kees Stoop, Leven en Werk (in English: Live and Work) was published.
