= Rolf Leeser =

German-born Dutch footballer

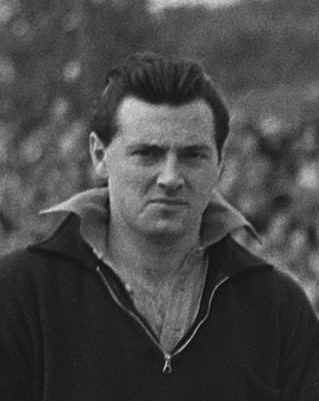
- Leeser in May 1954

Personal information
- Date of birth: 4 June 1929
- Place of birth: Essen, Germany
- Date of death: 21 March 2018 (aged 88)
- Place of death: Amsterdam, Netherlands

Youth career
- c. 1941– ?: Ajax Youth Academy

Senior career*
Years	Team	Apps	(Gls)
1948–1954	AFC Ajax	34	(6)
- * Club domestic league appearances and goals

Rolf Leeser (4 June 1929 – 21 March 2018) was a German-born footballer who played for Ajax in the Netherlands from 1948 to 1954.

== Biography ==
Leeser, born in Essen on 4 June 1929, was of Jewish descent. He joined the Ajax youth academy at the age of 12, and made his first professional appearance for the club on 19 September 1948. Leeser became a regular during the 1951–52 season, and continued to play until April 1954, scoring six goals in 34 total appearances for the club over the course of his career.

Outside of football, Leeser was a fashion designer. He founded Leeser B.V., a women's fashion chain, and contributed to the redesign of the Ajax logo, which has been in use since 1990. He died on 21 March 2018, aged 88. Lesser was married to jurist Anita B. Leeser-Gassan.
