= Herman Redemeijer =

Dutch politician and educator (1930–2020)

Member of the Senate
- In office 23 June 1987 – 13 June 1995

Member of the States of Overijssel
- In office 22 August 1979 – 12 November 1987

Personal details
- Born: 27 November 1930 Hengelo, Netherlands
- Died: 29 February 2020 (aged 89) Almelo, Netherlands
- Party: Labour Party

Herman Redemeijer (27 November 1930 – 29 February 2020) was a Dutch politician and educator. He served as a member of the States of Overijssel between 1979 and 1987 and subsequently in the Senate of the Netherlands between 1997 and 1995. Redemeijer was a member of the Labour Party.

== Life ==
Redemeijer was born on 27 November 1930 in Hengelo. He chose a career in education, and was a teacher and later school principal. Redemeijer also worked for the teachers' union for ten years. From 1972 to 1987 he was a national inspector for special education.

Redemeijer at one point served in the municipal council of Bussum. On 22 August 1979 Redemijer became member of the States of Overijssel for the Labour Party. He served until 12 November 1987. Redemeijer had already entered the Senate of the Netherlands on 23 June 1987. In the Senate he was the Labour spokesperson for education, agriculture and development aid. He was chair of the commission of education between October 1993 and June 1995.

Redemeijer died on the leap day of 2020 in Almelo, aged 89.
