= Mien Schopman-Klaver =

Dutch sprinter

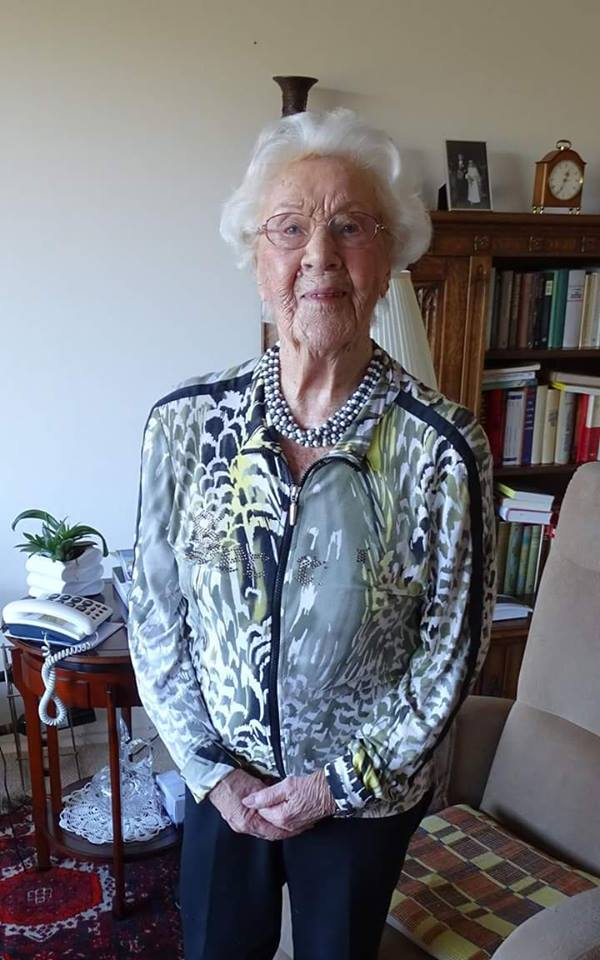
- Mien Schopman-Klaver in 2016

Personal information
- Born: Wilhelmina Hendrika Klaver; 26 February 1911 Amsterdam, Netherlands
- Died: 10 July 2018 (aged 107) Leiden, Netherlands
- Spouse: Leo Schopman (1936–1984)

Sport
- Sport: Athletics
- Club: ADA, Amsterdam

Wilhelmina Hendrika "Mien" Schopman-Klaver (26 February 1911 – 10 July 2018) was a Dutch athlete who was a reserve for the 4 × 100 metres relay at the 1932 Summer Olympics in Los Angeles. She was born in Amsterdam.

== Personal best marks ==
- 100 m: 12.7 s (August 1931, Amsterdam)
- Long jump: 5.02 m (16 ft 5 1/2 in)
- High jump: 1.45 m (4 ft 9 in)
