= Cor Pierik =

Dutch politician (born 1965)

Member of the House of Representatives
- In office 6 December 2023 – 11 November 2025

Personal details
- Born: 1965 (age 60–61) Genemuiden, Netherlands
- Party: Farmer–Citizen Movement
- Children: 4

Cor R. Pierik (born 1965) is a Dutch politician who has been a member of the House of Representatives on behalf of the Farmer–Citizen Movement (BBB) since 2023.

== Career ==
Pierik studied in Dordrecht, and he started working for Statistics Netherlands (CBS) in 1990. He would work there for 33 years in positions such as agricultural spokesperson and project leader for environmental publications. He participated in a joint interview with BBB leader Caroline van der Plas and later registered with the party. Pierik ran for the House of Representatives in the November 2023 general election as the BBB's sixth candidate and was elected. In an interview, he called agriculture his passion and stressed innovations within the sector would be required to solve the nitrogen crisis in the Netherlands. He was the BBB's spokesperson for housing, agriculture, food quality, nature, and environment, but his specialties changed to infrastructure and water management following the swearing in of the Schoof cabinet. He did not run for re-election in 2025, and his term ended on 11 November 2025.

=== House committee assignments ===
- Contact group United Kingdom
- Committee for Infrastructure and Water Management

== Personal life ==
Pierik was born in Genemuiden to a farmer. After studying, he lived in The Hague before returning to his parental home. He ran the family business in Genemuiden next to his job at CBS. He and his wife Karin remained residents of Genemuiden as of 2024, and they have three daughters and one son. Two of their daughters took over the 27-hectare (67-acre) farm with 15 cows and 60 sheep. Pierik is a member of the Reformed Church of Genemuiden, part of the Protestant Church in the Netherlands, and he headed its church council for four years as an elder. He was diagnosed with colorectal cancer with metastases in the lymph nodes and peritoneum in May 2022, and his chance of survival was estimated at 20%. He recovered, and his chemotherapy was halted a year after diagnosis.

== Electoral history ==
Electoral history of Cor Pierik
Year	Body	Party	Pos.	Votes	Result		Ref.
Year	Body	Party	Pos.	Votes	Party seats	Individual	Ref.
2023	House of Representatives	Farmer–Citizen Movement	6	2,181	7	Won	
