= Mars Nederland =

Dutch division of Mars, Incorporated

- Company type: Division
- Headquarters: Veghel, North Brabant
- Parent: Mars, Incorporated
- Website: www.mars.com/netherlands/en/index.aspx

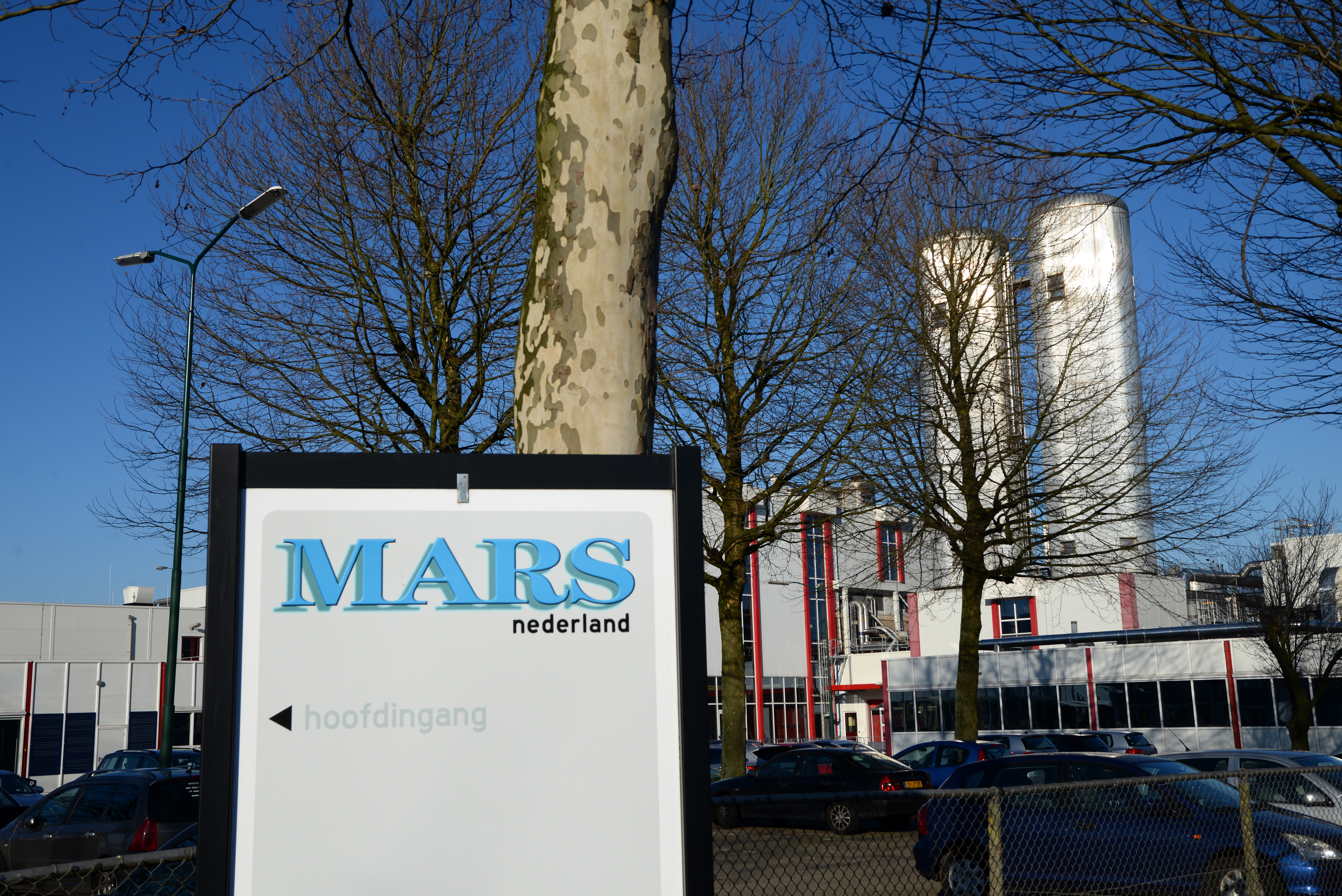
Mars Veghel factory entrance

Mars Nederland (English: Mars Netherlands) is the Dutch division of Mars, Incorporated, a privately held multi-national company in food, pet care products, and confectionery products. It has its headquarters and main production site in Veghel, North Brabant known as Mars Nederland B.V. A second production site is located in Oud-Beijerland, South Holland. The chocolate factory in Veghel is the largest production site owned by Mars, Incorporated, and is among the largest chocolate factories in the world.

It was opened in 1963. Mars has over 230 sites around the world.

== 2016 Product recall ==
In February 2016, Mars recalled products from 55 countries after pieces from a red plastic container were found in chocolate. The chocolate had best before dates between 19 June 2016 and 8 January 2017, and was produced in the Veghel factory. A piece of red plastic had been found by a customer in a bar of Snickers.

== Structure ==
The Marsfabriek is situated in Veghel, in the north-east of North Brabant (Noord-Brabant), in the south of the Netherlands. Mars Veghel employ about 1200 people. The site lies in the west of Veghel, towards the A50 motorway. To the east of the plant is the South Willem's Canal (Zuid-Willemsvaart) which runs north-west to south-east along the N279.

Mars also employs 250 people further north in Oud-Beijerland in South Holland, south of Rotterdam; the site makes Dolmio, and other non-chocolate products. Jack Tabbers is the General Manager of Mars Nederland.

== Function ==
Products it makes include Mars, Bounty, Snickers and Milky Way. It makes 254,000 tonnes of chocolate products a year.
