= Kornelis Heiko Miskotte =

Dutch Protestant theologian

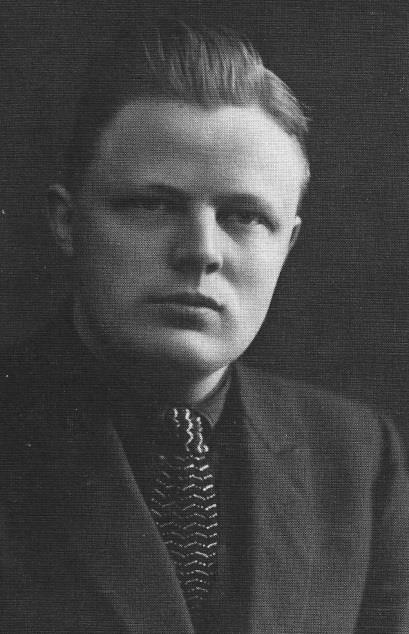
- Born: 23 September 1894; Utrecht, Netherlands
- Died: 31 August 1976 (aged 81); Voorst, Netherlands
- Title: Theologian
- Theological work
- Tradition or movement: Reformed Theology; Christian socialism

Kornelis Heiko Miskotte (23 September 1894 in Utrecht – 31 August 1976 in Voorst) was a Dutch Protestant theologian and a representative of dialectical theology.

== Life ==
Miskotte was born to a conservative Reformed Protestant family in the Netherlands. After attending Christian high school, he studied theology in his home city of Utrecht from 1914 to 1920. Theologically, he came under influence of the ethical theology of Johannes Hermanus Gunning, who taught an artful synthesis of modern culture and biblical revelation. Philosophically, Miskotte was also influenced by the Neo-Kantian B.J.H. Ovink.

Miskotte became a socialist under the influence of the work of Henriëtte Roland Holst. As a theologian, he drew his inspiration from the Old Testament. In his writings, he frequently drew on socialism and the Old Testament to argue against the concepts of fate and nihilism.

== Pastorates ==
After finishing his studies, he served as a pastor in the village of Kortgene in Noord-Beveland from 1921 to 1925, where he became known as the "red pastor." He self-published his sermons and articles from his period as a pastor (subsequently republished under the title Als een die dient...). In 1923, he married Cornelia Johanna Cladder, a pious and mystically-inclined woman; they would have five children together. In 1925, Miskotte was called to the village of Meppel. In this period, he published a great deal about literature (Henriëtte Roland Holst, Thomas Mann, etc.). His radio sermons brought him to national prominence and made him known as a Dutch proponent of the theology of Swiss theologian Karl Barth. In 1930, he became a pastor in the city of Haarlem. He published many Bible studies and sermons while also finishing his dissertation, The Essence of the Jewish Religion (1932).

== Theology ==
=== Relation to Judaism ===
In his dissertation, Miskotte addressed Judaism from a phenomenological perspective and introduced thinkers as Herman Cohen, Max Brod, Franz Rosenzweig, Ernst Bloch, and Martin Buber to the Dutch public. He discussed these Jewish thinkers so extensively and with so much understanding and sympathy that his dissertation became a trusted introduction to Jewish philosophy within the Jewish community. Miskotte argued that Christian missions should not be directed toward the Jews. He regarded Judaism as a form of humanism in which humanity itself, following the views of Rosenzweig, fills the role of its own savior; the danger is that humanity will no longer need God or his Son (since God and reality would essentially coincide). However, he judged the Torah in an entirely positive manner as calling the people of Israel away from heathen veneration of the here and now. In the 1930s, he emerged as a major opponent of National Socialism.

=== Resistance to national socialism ===
In 1938, Miskotte moved to his fourth pastorate in Amsterdam. Among other things, he was given the task of reaching the unchurched in the south of Amsterdam. His second major phenomenological study, Edda en Thora (1939), a comparison between the German and the Jewish religion over themes such as creation, fate, virtue, etc. He designated Nazism as the "new heathenism" with all the accompanying dangers. Miskotte defined heathenism as a natural or folk religion within which people live out their lives. For Jews and Christians, however, God sets limits to natural religiosity. He published a volume titled Bijbelsch ABC (1941) on the basis of the Bible studies and discussion groups he held in Amsterdam-South. In that volume, he contended that knowledge of certain keywords such as "Doctrine," "Name," "Deed," "Word," "Sanctification," etc. was necessary in order to defend against modern nihilism. Miskotte was revered by believers and nonbelievers alike due to his public resistance to fascism and National Socialism. He also maintained contact with the underground resistance and sheltered several Jewish citizens of Amsterdam.

=== Critic of contemporary nihilism ===
In 1945, after the Second World War, Miskotte was appointed as an ecclesiastical professor at the University of Leiden, where he taught the history of Reformed theology from the period of orthodoxy until Karl Barth. He established the journal In De Waagschaal during this period. Shortly after the war, he experienced a personal tragedy. After the wedding feast of a Jewish survivor of the war, Miskotte's wife and daughter experienced food poisoning and died. As a consequence, Miskotte's health slowly declined. His third major work was titled When the Gods are Silent. Once again, his work broadly treated the relationship between the God of Israel and heathendom, providing a cultural-critical perspective on the nihilism that emerges after God and the gods have been dispensed with. During his period as a professor, he also advocated for a new edition of the Dutch Reformed Church's hymnbook. He retired due to poor health at the end of 1959.

== Death and legacy ==
Miskotte lived in Voorst until his death in 1976. In 1964, he received an honorary doctorate from the University of Glasgow. He left behind an enormous archive of diaries, letters, sermons, and opinion pieces; his archive is located at the University of Leiden.

In 2012, the Miskotte/Breukelman chair for theological hermeneutics of the Bible was established at the Protestant Theological University in order to encourage and maintain the study of Miskotte's theology. Currently, the chair is occupied by Dr. R.H. Reeling Brouwer.

In 2021, an international theology conference on Miskotte's Biblical ABCs was jointly sponsored by the Miskotte Foundation, the Protestant Theological University, and the Aberdeen Centre for Protestant Theology.

== Bibliography ==
- Kornelis Heiko Miskotte (1968). The Roads of Prayer. New York: Sheed and Ward. OCLC 444116.
- Kornelis Heiko Miskotte (1967). When the Gods Are Silent. New York: Harper & Row. OCLC 301432349.
- Kornelis Heiko Miskotte (2021). Biblical ABCs: The Basics of Christian Resistance. Lanham, MD: Lexington Books/Fortress Press. OCLC 1263251177
