= 2021 in the Netherlands =

- Decades: 2000s; 2010s; 2020s
- See also: Other events of 2021; History of the Netherlands

Events from the year 2021 in the Netherlands.

== Incumbents ==
- Monarch: Willem-Alexander
- Prime Minister: Mark Rutte
- Speaker of the House of Representatives: Vera Bergkamp
- President of the Senate: Jan Anthonie Bruijn

== Ongoing ==
- COVID-19 pandemic in the Netherlands

== Events ==
=== January to March ===
- 14 January – Lodewijk Asscher resigns as Leader of the Labour Party following the childcare benefits scandal; Lilianne Ploumen succeeds him four days later.
- 15 January – The Third Rutte cabinet becomes a demissionary cabinet following the childcare benefits scandal.
- 23–26 January – Protests and riots take place across the country as a 9 pm curfew is put into effect in a context of COVID-19 pandemic.
- 15–17 March – A general election for the House of Representatives took place. The VVD win a plurality of seats in the Second Chamber on a 78.7% voter turnout.

=== April to June ===
- 18–22 May – The Eurovision Song Contest 2021 was held in Rotterdam after the cancellation of the 2020 contest due to the COVID-19 pandemic. Italy took the victory.
- 9 June - In Noordwijk, the Museum of Comic Art, Noordwijk opens its doors to the general public.

=== July to September ===
- 6 July - Murder of Peter R. de Vries: Peter R. de Vries, Dutch investigative journalist, is shot in the head outside RTL Boulevard studio in Amsterdam’s Lange Leidsedwarsstraat around 19:30 CEST while walking to his car.
- 14 July - 2021 European floods: Heavy rains cause severe flooding in Limburg, Valkenburg, Venlo, and Friesland, forcing thousands to evacuate and causing hundreds of homes to be damaged.
- 5 September - Max Verstappen wins the Dutch Grand Prix.

=== October to December ===
- 13 November - The Netherlands government reimposes a partial COVID-19 lockdown with early closures, social distancing, and limits on gatherings after record infections.
- 19 November - November 2021 protests and riots: Protests against the 2G COVID-19 rule turn violent in several cities, including Rotterdam, where 51 were arrested; peaceful protests occur in Amsterdam and Breda.

=== Undated ===
- January: A Dutch public prosecutor declines to pursue criminal charges against Belastingdienst officers for extortion and discrimination; an appeal is launched in April and remains unresolved by the year’s end.
- February: Dutch parliament votes to allow roughly 10,000 stateless refugees to apply for Dutch citizenship; implementation is delayed until July.
- March: Nationwide demonstrations are held by environmental activists, despite COVID-19 restrictions.
- July: A Dutch Interior Ministry committee issues a report on Dutch slavery, calling it a crime against humanity and recommending an official apology, investigation, and measures against institutional racism.
- September: Dutch parliament condemns the government for inadequate protection of Afghans who had worked with Dutch organizations following the Taliban takeover.
- November: Royal Netherlands Marechaussee announces it will no longer use ethnic profiling for border checks.
