= Jan Koopmans =

Dutch theologian

Jan Koopmans (May 26, 1905, in Sliedrecht – March 24, 1945, in Amsterdam) was a Dutch theologian, best known for his works De Nederlandsche Geloofsbelijdenis (1939) and Wat wij wel en wat wij niet geloven (1941).
