= John Pierik =

Dutch sports shooter (1949–2018)

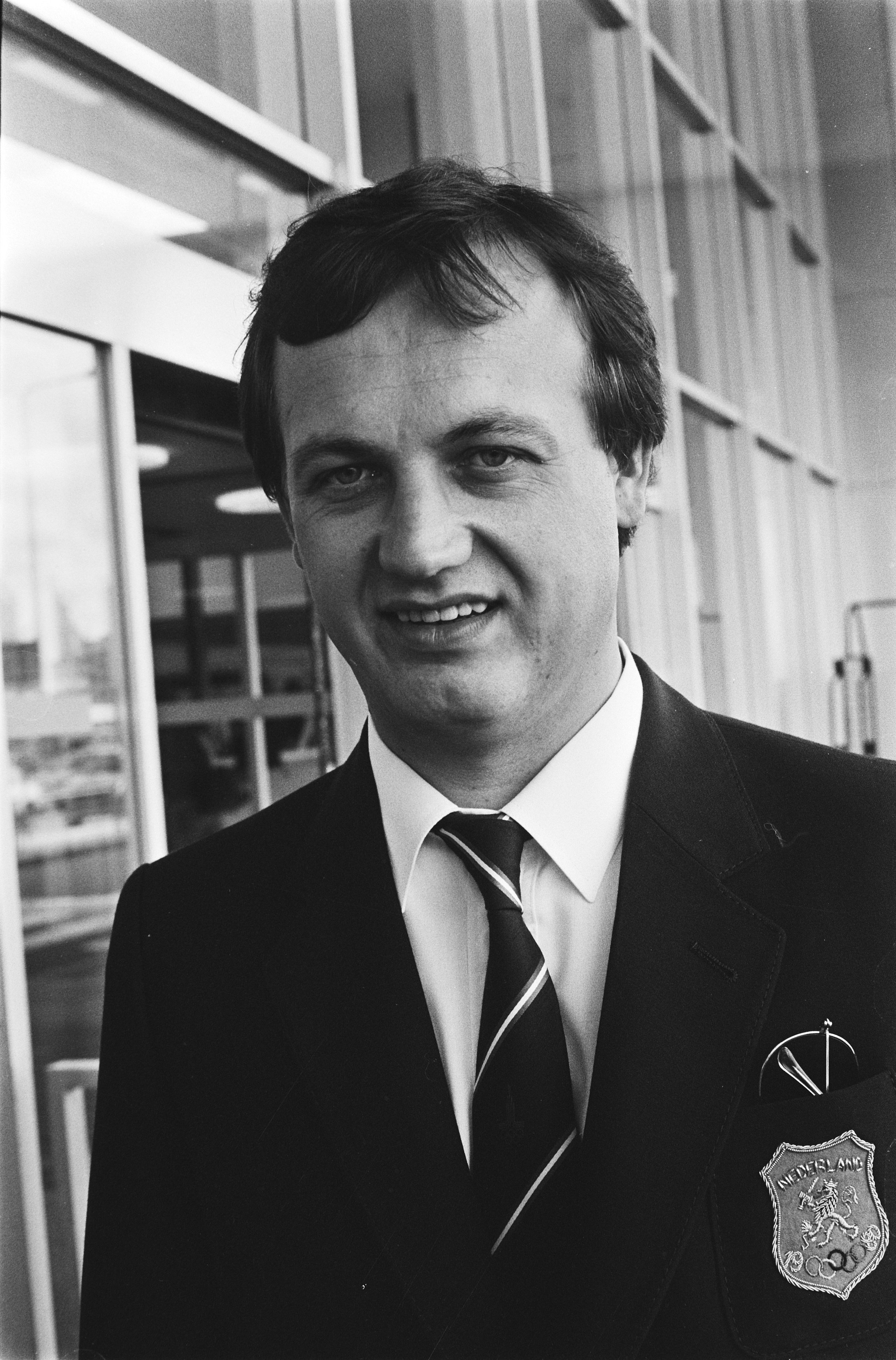
- John Pierik in 1980

Personal information
- Full name: Johannes Gerhardus Maria Pierik
- Born: 9 August 1949 Hengelo, the Netherlands
- Died: 14 January 2018 (aged 68)
- Height: 1.82 m (6 ft 0 in)
- Weight: 86 kg (190 lb)

Sport
- Sport: Skeet shooting

Johannes Gerhardus Maria "John" Pierik (9 August 1949 – 14 January 2018) was a Dutch shooter. He competed in the mixed skeet event at the 1980 and 1984 Olympics and finished in eleventh and fourth place, respectively.
