= 2017 in the Netherlands =

This article lists major events that happened in 2017 in the Netherlands.

== Incumbents ==
- Monarch: Willem-Alexander
- Prime Minister: Mark Rutte (VVD)
- Speaker of the House of Representatives: Khadija Arib (PvdA)
- President of the Senate: Ankie Broekers-Knol (VVD)

== Events ==
- 21 January: Women's March in Amsterdam and The Hague.
- 26 January: Ard van der Steur (VVD) resigns as Minister of Security and Justice.
- 1 March: Arno Brok (VVD) is appointed to be the King's Commissioner of Friesland.
- 3 March: Prime Minister Mark Rutte refuses to allow Turkish authorities to organise a demonstration on Dutch territory as part of the campaign for the upcoming constitutional referendum; beginning of the 2017 Dutch–Turkish diplomatic incident.
- 11 March: 2017 Dutch–Turkish diplomatic incident.
- 15 March: Dutch general election, 2017.
- 17 March: Pauline Krikke (VVD) takes over as Mayor of The Hague.
- 9 May: Dick Advocaat assumes for the third time the position of coach of the Netherlands national football team.
- 14 May: Feyenoord wins the 2016–17 Eredivisie.
- 27 May: at Eindhoven Airport, a parking building under construction collapses; no workers are hurt as it happens on a Saturday.
- July–August: 2017 fipronil eggs contamination.
- 1 September: Ahmed Marcouch (PvdA) becomes the new Mayor of Arnhem.
- 4 October: Jeanine Hennis-Plasschaert (VVD) and Tom Middendorp resign from the Ministry of Defence.
- 5 October: death of the Mayor of Amsterdam, Eberhard van der Laan (PvdA), due to cancer.
- 18–22 October: Amsterdam Dance Event, Dutch DJ Martin Garrix wins DJ Mag's Top 100 first place for the second time.
- 26 October: installment of the Third Rutte cabinet.
- 1 November: King Willem-Alexander inaugurates the Rijnstraat 8 building in The Hague, new seat of both the Ministry of Foreign Affairs and Ministry of Infrastructure, Public Works and Water Management.
- 18 November: pro-Zwarte Piet locals occupy the A7 motorway near Dokkum, Friesland to block demonstrators from getting into town and disrupt the Sinterklaas festivities.
- 29 November: Slobodan Praljak commits suicide in the courtroom of the International Criminal Tribunal for the former Yugoslavia, The Hague.
- 1 December: Jetta Klijnsma (PvdA) is appointed to be the King's Commissioner of Drenthe.
- 10 December: opening of Boskoop Snijdelwijk railway station.
- 13 December: Lilian Marijnissen succeeds to Emile Roemer as Leader of the Socialist Party.

== Deaths ==
- 8 January - Dicky van Ekris, 84, Olympic swimmer.
- 1 February - Cor van der Hoeven, 95, footballer (Ajax).
- 11 March - Kitty Courbois, 79, actress (Leedvermaak), brain haemorrhage.
- 23 April - Chriet Titulaer, 73, astronomer, television presenter, and science and technology writer.
- 19 May - Hubertus Ernst, 100, Roman Catholic prelate, Bishop of Breda (1967–1992).
- 4 June - Bennie Hofs, 70, footballer (Vitesse).
- 3 July - Tom Blom, 70, radio and television presenter (Te land, ter zee en in de lucht).
- 5 August - Egbert Haverkamp-Begemann, 94, Dutch-born American art historian.
- 3 September - Piet Ouderland, 84, footballer (Ajax, national team) and basketball player (national team).
- 1 October - Hansje Bunschoten, 59, Olympic swimmer (1972) and television presenter, complications from breast cancer.

== See also ==
- 2016–17 Eredivisie
- List of Dutch Top 40 number-one singles of 2017
- Netherlands in the Eurovision Song Contest 2017
- Netherlands in the Junior Eurovision Song Contest 2017
