= Khadija Arib =

Dutch politician, civil servant, educator and social worker

- خديجة عريب
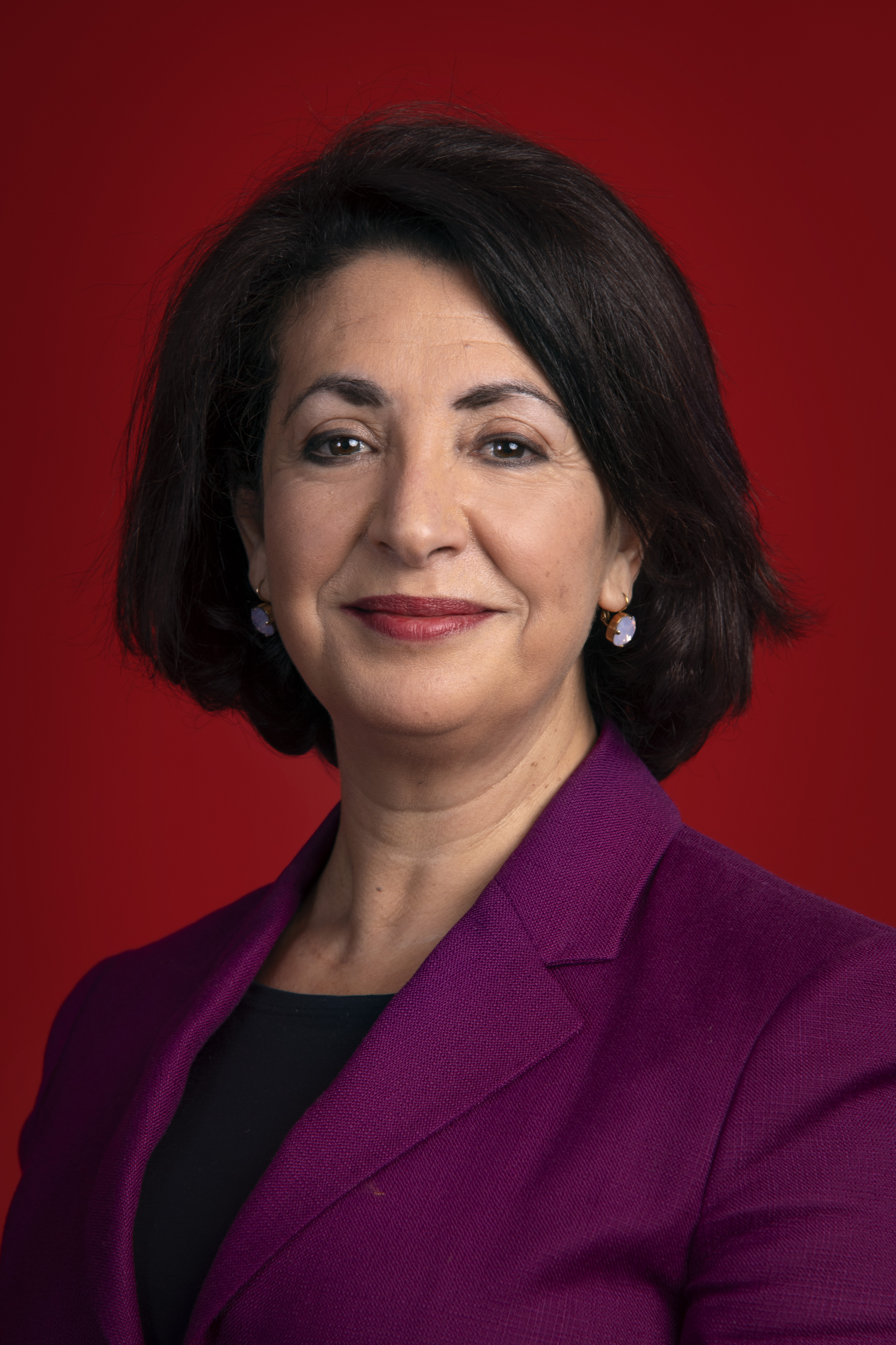
- Arib in 2021

Speaker of the House of Representatives
- In office 13 January 2016 – 7 April 2021; Acting: 12 December 2015 – 13 January 2016
- Preceded by: Anouchka van Miltenburg
- Succeeded by: Vera Bergkamp

Member of the House of Representatives
- In office 1 March 2007 – 4 November 2022
- Succeeded by: Julian Bushoff
- In office 19 May 1998 – 30 November 2006

Personal details
- Born: Khadija Arib; 10 October 1960 (age 66) Hedami, Morocco
- Citizenship: Netherlands; Morocco
- Party: Labour Party
- Spouse: Nordine Dahhan (divorced)
- Children: 3
- Education: University of Amsterdam (M.Sc., Sociology)
- Occupation: Politician; civil servant; educator; social worker

Khadija Arib (Dutch: [xaːˈdiɕaː ʔaːˈrip]; Arabic: خديجة عريب; born 10 October 1960) is a Moroccan-born Dutch politician of the Labour Party, who served as Speaker of the House of Representatives of the Netherlands from 12 December 2015 to 7 April 2021. In the 2016 Speaker of the Dutch House of Representatives election on 13 January, she was elected to the position, which she had served as Acting Speaker since the resignation of Anouchka van Miltenburg on 12 December 2015. Arib became a member of the House of Representatives following the 1998 Dutch general election and served until 2022, with a brief interruption between 2006 and 2007.

== Early life ==
Khadija Arib was born on 10 October 1960 in Hedami near Casablanca, Morocco. She came to the Netherlands when she was 15 years old. Her parents worked at a laundry service in Schiedam. Arib studied sociology at the University of Amsterdam. Before her political career, she was a civil servant, educator and social worker.

== Politics ==
Arib is a member of the Labour Party (Partij van de Arbeid, PvdA) and a member of Parliament from 19 May 1998 to 29 November 2006 and since 1 March 2007. In the House, she focussed on matters of racism, discrimination, abuse, domestic violence, and youth care. She has been criticised (mainly by members of the Party for Freedom) for her dual citizenship and for her part in an advisory committee to the King of Morocco. In 2012, she made an unsuccessful attempt to become speaker and became first deputy speaker instead. She was elected speaker in an interim election on 13 January 2016, defeating three other candidates. On 29 March 2017 Arib was re-elected as speaker, she was the only candidate for the position.

After the 2021 Dutch general election, Arib lost her position as speaker. She became a member of the opposition and was part of the PvdA group. She was appointed chair of a committee to prepare the parliamentary inquiry into the approach to the corona pandemic. NRC reported in September 2022 that the presidium and clerk of the House of Representatives had voted unanimously to start an investigation into misconduct following two anonymous letters that accused Arib of abuse of power and creating an unsafe work environment. Arib left the parliament on 3 November 2022, and she was succeeded by Julian Bushoff.

After the investigation finished in October 2023, the presidium stated that Arib had created a socially unsafe work environment and a summary was released. The investigation concluded that Arib had systematically interfered in decisions of the civil service organization and that she had raised her voice to at least ten employees. Arib subsequently started a lawsuit to discredit the investigation, arguing that the presidium and the parliamentary clerk were not authorized to order one. The District Court of The Hague ruled in February 2025 that the inquiry had been legitimate and that the presidium had the duty as an employer to look into indications of an unsafe work environment. It determined that the investigation had been conducted in line with the rules. The court rejected Arib's argument that she had been unable to defend herself against the accusations. Arib's lawyers announced that she would appeal the decision. Prosecution was started in November 2024 against an employee of the presidium for leaking the existence of the inquiry to the press, following a two-year investigation by the Internal Investigations Department.

In March 2024, Arib became chair of the Schiphol Social Council (MRS), which had been established the year before to advise Amsterdam Airport Schiphol on its plans on behalf of local residents. Minister of Infrastructure and Water Management Mark Harbers appointed her to a four-year term.

== Political positions ==
During her career, Arib has been a champion for women's rights and the empowerment of women with a migrant background in the Netherlands; she was a founding member and president of the Moroccan Women in the Netherlands Foundation. In 1989, she was held prisoner in Morocco with her 3 children, after publicly addressing issues concerning the position of women in Moroccan society. After intervention by the Dutch Ministry of Foreign Affairs, she was allowed to return to the Netherlands.

== Electoral history ==
A (possibly incomplete) overview of Dutch elections Khadija Arib participated in
Election	Party	Candidate number	Votes
1998 Dutch general election	Labour Party	12	4.438
2002 Dutch general election	Labour Party	18	8.602
2003 Dutch general election	Labour Party	12	13.827
2006 Dutch general election	Labour Party	34	6.028
2010 Dutch general election	Labour Party	30	5.121
2012 Dutch general election	Labour Party	30	6.625
2017 Dutch general election	Labour Party	2	48.440
2021 Dutch general election	Labour Party	2	52.493

== Bibliography ==
- 1992: Marokkaanse vrouwen in Nederland (Moroccan women in the Netherlands) with Essa Reijmers
- 2009: Couscous op zondag (Couscous on Sundays)
- 2011: Allah heeft ons zo gemaakt (Allah made us like this)

Political offices
Preceded by Anouchka van Miltenburg	Speaker of the House of Representatives; 2016–2021	Succeeded by Vera Bergkamp
