= List of Austrian films of the 1980s =

A list of films produced in the Cinema of Austria in the 1980s ordered by year of release. For an alphabetical list of articles on Austrian films see Category:Austrian films.

== 1980s ==
Title	Director	Cast	Genre	Studio/Notes
1980
Das eine Glück und das andere	Axel Corti	Suzanne von Borsody, Peter Simonischek, Hans Brenner	Drama	
Egon Schiele – Exzess und Bestrafung	Herbert Vesely	Mathieu Carrière, Jane Birkin, Christine Kaufmann		
Exit... nur keine Panik (Exit - Just Don't Panic)	Franz Novotny	Paulus Manker, Hanno Pöschl, Isolde Barth, Eddie Constantine	Action comedy	Günther Köpf Film / Terra-Film
Fleischwolf (Meat grinder)	Houchang Allahyari	Hanno Pöschl, Barbara Demmer, Thomas Morris	Drama	
Die kleine Figur meines Vaters	Wolfgang Glück	Ludwig Hirsch, Rudolf Wessely	Drama	Austrian-Hungarian-West German co-production
1981
Anima – Symphonie phantastique	Titus Leber	Mathieu Carrière, Charo López		Screened at the 1981 Cannes Film Festival
Der Bockerer	Franz Antel	Karl Merkatz		Entered into the 12th Moscow International Film Festival
Mephisto	István Szabó	Klaus Maria Brandauer, Krystyna Janda, Rolf Hoppe, Karin Boyd	Drama	Hungarian-West German-East German-Austrian co-production
Schöne Tage (Beautiful Days)	Fritz Lehner	Martin Fritz, Johann Woschitz	Drama	
Der Schüler Gerber (Student Gerber)	Wolfgang Glück	Gabriel Barylli, Werner Kreindl	Drama	
Der Traum des Sandino (Sandino's Dream)	Margareta Heinrich		Documentary	filmed in Nicaragua
Den Tüchtigen gehört die Welt (The World Belongs to the Thorough)	Peter Patzak	Franz Buchrieser	Crime film	Beginning of the Kottan series
Ein wenig sterben (Die a Little)	Mansur Madavi	Alfred Solm	Drama	
1982
Die Ausgesperrten (The Excluded)	Franz Novotny	Rudolf Wessely, Paulus Manker, Christine Kaufmann	TV Drama	Based on Wonderful, Wonderful Times by Elfriede Jelinek
Café Malaria	Niki List	Andreas Vitásek	Comedy	Max-Ophüls-Preis 1983
Die Erben (The Inheritors)	Walter Bannert	Nikolas Vogel, Robert Schauer	Drama	Bannert-Film
God Does Not Believe in Us Anymore	Axel Corti	Johannes Silberschneider, Armin Mueller-Stahl, Barbara Petritsch	Drama	
Sei zärtlich, Pinguin (Be Gentle, Penguin)	Peter Hajek	Marie Colbin, Heinz Hoenig	Romantic comedy	Dieter Geissler Film u. a.
1983
Angst (Fear)	Gerald Kargl	Erwin Leder, Silvia Ryder, Karin Springer, Edith Rosset, Rudolf Götz	Horror	
Herrenjahre	Axel Corti	Peter Simonischek	Drama	
Hirnbrennen (Brain Burning)	Leopold Huber	Heidi Baratta, Gerhard Dorfer, Enzi Fuchs, Eva Kerbler	Drama	
Karambolage	Kitty Kino	Marie Colbin, Wilfried Baasner	Satire	
Der Stille Ozean (The Silent Ocean)	Xaver Schwarzenberger	Hanno Pöschl, Marie-France Pisier		Entered into the 33rd Berlin International Film Festival
Tramps	Peter Patzak	Elliott Gould		
Der Weg ins Freie (The Road into the Open)	Karin Brandauer	Klaus Maria Brandauer, Hans Clarin	Drama	
1984
Eine blassblaue Frauenschrift (Pale Blue Ink in a Lady's Hand)	Axel Corti	Krystyna Janda, Friedrich von Thun, Gabriel Barylli	Drama	
Dear Karl	Maria Knilli			
Dicht hinter der Tür (Just Behind the Door)	Mansur Madavi			
Malambo	Milan Dor	Klaus Rohrmoser		
Tiger: Springtime in Vienna	Peter Patzak	Art Metrano, William Berger, Eddie Constantine	Comedy	
Time Troopers (Morgengrauen)	Peter Sämann	Albert Fortell, Hannelore Elsner, Barbara Rudnik, Hans-Georg Panczak	Science fiction	
1985
Coconuts	Franz Novotny	Hanno Pöschl, Olivia Pascal, Rainhard Fendrich, Mario Adorf	Comedy	
Oberst Redl (Colonel Redl)	István Szabó	Klaus Maria Brandauer, Armin Mueller-Stahl, Gudrun Landgrebe	Drama	nominated for an Oscar and other awards
Die Praxis der Liebe (The Practice of Love)	Valie Export	Adelheid Arndt, Rüdiger Vogler		Entered into the 35th Berlin International Film Festival
Raffl	Christian Berger	Lois Weinberger, Dietmar Schönherr		Entered into the 14th Moscow International Film Festival
Das zweite Schraube-Fragment	Walter Andreas Christen		Short	Screened at the 1986 Cannes Film Festival
1986
Der Aufstand	Peter Patzak	Joachim Bißmeier, Monica Bleibtreu	Drama	
Echo Park	Robert Dornhelm	Susan Dey, Tom Hulce, Heinrich Schweiger	comedy	American-Austrian co-production
Heidenlöcher (Hideouts)	Wolfram Paulus	Matthias Aichhorn, Albert Paulus	Drama / new Heimatfilm	Marwo-Film u. a. Entered into the 36th Berlin International Film Festival
Müllers Büro (Müller's Office) (Müller's Bureau)	Niki List	Christian Schmidt, Barbara Rudnik, Andreas Vitásek	Musical comedy / detective film	Wega Film
Santa Fe	Axel Corti	Gabriel Barylli	Drama	Thalia
Welcome in Vienna	Axel Corti	Gabriel Barylli	Drama	Thalia
1987
38 – Auch das war Wien ('38 – Vienna Before the Fall)	Wolfgang Glück	Tobias Engel, Sunnyi Melles	Literary film after Friedrich Torberg	Nominated for an Oscar
Einstweilen wird es Mittag (Marienthal: The Sociography of an Unemployed Community)	Karin Brandauer	Franziska Walser, August Schmölzer, Inge Maux	Drama	
Gewitter im Mai (Storms in May)	Xaver Schwarzenberger	Gabriel Barylli, Claudia Messner	Drama	Austrian-West German co-production
Johann Strauß – Der König ohne Krone (Johann Strauss: The King Without a Crown)	Franz Antel	Oliver Tobias, Mary Crosby, Audrey Landers, John Phillip Law, Karin Dor, Mathieu Carrière, Rolf Hoppe, Zsa Zsa Gabor	Musical / Biographical film	Austrian-East German co-production
Schmutz	Paulus Manker		Drama	Entered into the 15th Moscow International Film Festival
Das weite Land (The Distant Land)	Luc Bondy	Michel Piccoli, Bulle Ogier	Drama	Austrian-West German co-production. Screened at the 1987 Cannes Film Festival
1989
Der siebente Kontinent (The Seventh Continent)	Michael Haneke	Dieter Berner, Birgit Doll, Leni Tanzer, Udo Samel	Drama	Michael Haneke's cinefilm debut. Wega Film
Ein Sohn aus gutem Hause	Karin Brandauer	Alexander Lutz, Angelica Ladurner, Georg Friedrich, Felix von Manteuffel, Ewa Błaszczyk, Rolf Boysen, Walter Schmidinger	Drama	
Sterben und Leben im Schloß (Death and Life in the Castle)	Egon Humer		Documentary	Documentary film about Hartheim Euthanasia Centre
Die toten Fische (The Dead Fishes)	Michael Synek	Joe Berger, Erwin Leder	Drama	
