= List of Austrian films of the 1970s =

A list of films produced in the Cinema of Austria in the 1970s ordered by year of release. For an alphabetical list of articles on Austrian films see Category:Austrian films.

| Title | Director | Cast | Genre | Notes |
|---|---|---|---|---|
1970
| - | | | | |
1971
| Der Fall Jägerstätter (The Jägerstätter Case) | Axel Corti | Kurt Weinzierl, Julia Gschnitzer | TV Drama | Neue Thalia-Film/ZDF/ORF |
| The First Day | Herbert Holba | | | Entered into the 21st Berlin International Film Festival |
1972
| Außer Rand und Band am Wolfgangsee (Out of Control on the Wolfgangsee) | Franz Antel | Heidi Hansen, Ernst Schütz | Comedy | Franz Antel Film/Neue Delta/Terra |
| Liebe durch die Autotür (Love through the Car Door) | Eddy Saller | Erich Padalewski | Comedy | |
| The Merry Quartet from the Filling Station | Franz Antel | Uschi Glas,Hans-Jürgen Bäumler, Willy Millowitsch | Musical comedy | Co-production with West Germany |
| Sie nannten ihn Krambambuli (They Called Him Krambambuli) | Franz Antel | Michael Schanze, Fritz Wepper | Drama | Divina-Film/Neue Delta |
1973
| Die beiden Nachtwandler (The Two Sleepwalkers) | Leopold Lindtberg | | Drama | after Johann Nestroy |
| Ein junger Mann aus dem Innviertel | Axel Corti | Franz Trager | Biography | |
| Situation (Slaughter Day) | Peter Patzak | Rita Tushingham, William Berger, Gordon Mitchell | Crime film | |
1974
| Fräulein Else | Ernst Haeussermann | Marianne Nentwich, Curd Jürgens | Drama | |
| Das Land des Lächelns (The Land of Smiles) | Arthur Maria Rabenalt | | Drama | |
| Das Manifest (The Manifesto) | Antonis Lepeniotis | Gerald Florian, Peter Garell | Drama | Cinecoop-Film |
1975
| Permission to Kill | Cyril Frankel | Dirk Bogarde, Ava Gardner, Bekim Fehmiu, Timothy Dalton, Nicole Calfan, Frederic Forrest, John Levene | Drama, Thriller | Austrian-British-American co-production, with Sascha-Film and Warner Bros. |
| Moses und Aron (Moses and Aaron) | Jean-Marie Straub | Günter Reich, Louis Devos, Eva Csapo, Roger Lucas | Drama, Musical | Screened at the 1975 Cannes Film Festival |
| Parapsycho – Spektrum der Angst (Parapsycho: Spectrum of Fear) | Peter Patzak | Leon Askin, Debra Berger | Horror film | TIT Film, Viktoria-Film |
| Totstellen – Der Sohn eines Landarbeiters wird Bauarbeiter und baut sich ein Haus (The Condemned) | Axel Corti | Klaus Rott, Wolfgang Hübsch | TV drama | Schönbrunn-Film/WDR/ORF, entered into the 9th Moscow International Film Festival |
| Sweet Derriere | Georg Tressler | Werner Ploner, Elfriede Gerstl | Comedy | |
1976
| Alpensaga - Liebe im Dorf (Alpine Saga: Love in the Village | Dieter Berner | | Drama | Part 1 |
| As of Tomorrow (Ab morgen sind wir reich und ehrlich) | Franz Antel | Arthur Kennedy, Carroll Baker, Curd Jürgens, Vittorio Caprioli, Angelo Infanti | Comedy | a.k.a. Blackmail Chase. West German-Austrian-Italian co-production |
| Bait (Zerschossene Träume) | Peter Patzak | Yves Beneyton, Carroll Baker, Raymond Pellegrin, Mathieu Carrière, André Heller | Crime | a.k.a. Shattered Dreams. West German-Austrian-French co-production |
| Drei Wege zum See (Three Paths to the Lake) | Michael Haneke | Ursula Schult, Guido Wieland, Walter Schmidinger, Bernhard Wicki, Yves Beneyton | Drama | |
| Duett zu dritt (Tea for Three) | Gerhard Janda | Iris Berben, Mascha Gonska, Heinz Marecek, Eric Pohlmann | Comedy | |
| Fehlschuß (Missed Goal) | Rainer Boldt | Wolfgang Ambros, Franz Buchrieser, Pola Kinski | Drama | |
| Ich will leben (I Want to Live) | Jörg A. Eggers | Kathina Kaiser, Heinz Bennent | Drama | |
| Der junge Freud (Young Dr. Freud) | Axel Corti | Karlheinz Hackl | TV Biography | Black and white |
| Jesus von Ottakring (Jesus of Ottakring) | Wilhelm Pellert | Rudolf Prack, Hilde Sochor | Drama | |
| Kindertotenlieder (Songs for Dead Children) | Titus Leber | | Experimental music film | |
| Stationschef Fallmerayer (Fallmerayer the Stationmaster) | Walter Davy | Odile Versois, Wolfgang Hübsch | Drama | |
| Wien-Film | Ernst Schmidt Jr. | Friedrich Achleitner, H. C. Artmann, Irina David | Experimental film | |
1977
| Casanova & Co. | Franz Antel | Tony Curtis, Britt Ekland, Marisa Berenson, Andréa Ferréol, Jean Lefebvre, Hugh Griffith | Comedy | Austrian-Italian-French co-production |
| Grete Minde | Heidi Genée | Katerina Jacob, Siemen Rühaak, Hannelore Elsner, Tilo Prückner, Hans Christian Blech | Drama | West German-Austrian co-production. Entered into the 27th Berlin International Film Festival |
| Langsamer Sommer (Slow Summer) | Michael Pilz | Eva Grimm, Katharina Pilz | | |
| Pause! (Break!) | Peter Kubelka | Arnulf Rainer | Short film, Avant garde | |
| The Standard | Ottokar Runze | Simon Ward, Peter Cushing, Jon Finch, Wolfgang Preiss, Lil Dagover, Siegfried Rauch, Maria Perschy, Robert Hoffmann, Rudolf Prack, Friedrich von Ledebur | Drama | a.k.a. Battle Flag. West German-Austrian-Spanish co-production |
| Unsichtbare Gegner (Invisible Adversaries) | Valie Export | Susanne Widl, Peter Weibel | Horror / Science fiction | Valie Export |
1978
| Die blinde Eule (The Blind Owl) | Mansur Madavi | | Drama | |
| The Devil's Bed (Tod im November / Die Wölfin vom Teufelsmoor) | Helmut Pfandler | John Phillip Law, Florinda Bolkan, Siegfried Wischnewski | Mystery | |
| Geile Nichten (Randy Nieces) | Eddy Saller | Erich Padalewski | Comedy | |
| Love Hotel in Tyrol | Franz Antel | Erich Padalewski, Teri Tordai, Fritz Muliar | Comedy | |
1979
| A Far Country (Berggasse 19) | Ernst Haeussermann | Curd Jürgens | Drama | |
| Feuer! | Reinhard Schwabenitzky | Christoph Waltz, Kurt Weinzierl, Erwin Leder | Drama | a.k.a. Trilogie 1848: Feuer! |
| The Fifth Musketeer | Ken Annakin | Beau Bridges, Sylvia Kristel, Ursula Andress, Cornel Wilde, José Ferrer, Olivia de Havilland, Rex Harrison | Adventure | |
| Kassbach – Ein Porträt | Peter Patzak | Walter Kohut, Immy Schell | Drama | Patzak-Film/Satel-Film. Entered into the 29th Berlin International Film Festival |
| Geschichten aus dem Wienerwald (Tales from the Vienna Woods) | Maximilian Schell | Birgit Doll, Hanno Pöschl, Helmut Qualtinger, André Heller | Drama | Austrian-West German co-production with Arabella-Film / BR etc. |
