= List of Austrian films =

A list of the most notable films produced in the Cinema of Austria, ordered by year and split by decade of release.

For an alphabetical list of articles on Austrian films see Category:Austrian films.

- List of Austrian films before 1920
- List of Austrian films of the 1920s
- List of Austrian films of the 1930s
- List of Austrian films of the 1940s
- List of Austrian films of the 1950s
- List of Austrian films of the 1960s
- List of Austrian films of the 1970s
- List of Austrian films of the 1980s
- List of Austrian films of the 1990s
- List of Austrian films of the 2000s
- List of Austrian films of the 2010s
- List of Austrian films of the 2020s
