= Werner Kniesek =

Austrian murderer (born 1946)

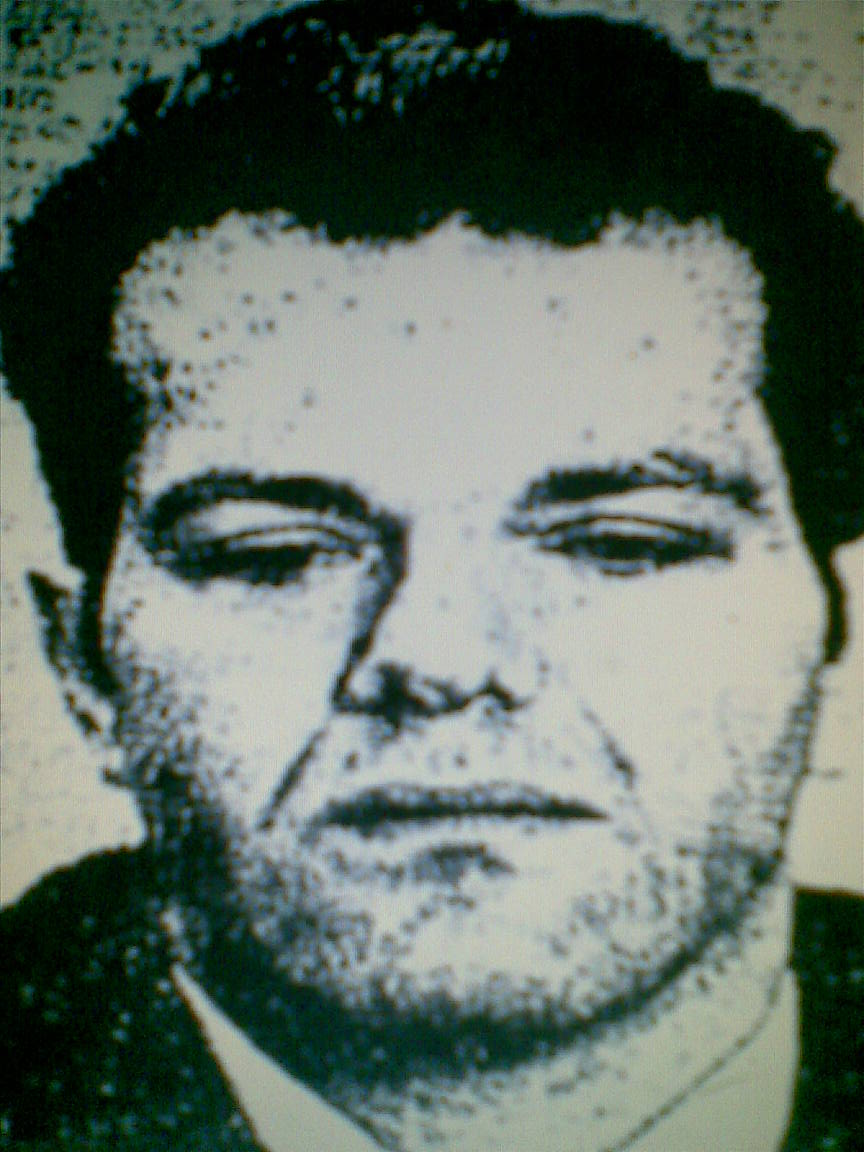
- Born: November 17, 1946 (age 79); Salzburg, Austria
- Status: Imprisoned
- Penalty: Life imprisonment

Details
- Locations: Sankt Pölten, Austria
- Killed: 3
- Weapons: Gas pistol, noose
- Imprisoned at: Stein Prison

Werner Kniesek (born November 17, 1946, in Salzburg) is an Austrian triple murderer. He is one of the most dangerous offenders in Austrian criminal history, having tortured and killed a family of three while on parole.

== First crimes ==
Born illegitimately and raised in Salzburg, Kniesek began skipping school, stealing and running away from home as a youth. He had never met his father, and his mother was overwhelmed with him, so she wanted him to move out and find his own home. When he learned of this, Werner stabbed his mother with a knife, stole some money and fled to Germany. The 16-year-old was arrested in Hamburg and extradited back to Austria. After two years of juvenile detention for attempted murder, Kniesek was released.

After committing several burglaries, Kniesek shot and injured a 73-year-old woman. In 1973, he pleaded insanity and was sentenced to eight-and-a-half years in prison. He was released on parole in early January 1980 for good behavior. A few weeks before his release, he was given a three-day leave from Garsten Prison to seek work. At the time of his parole, Kniesek had been convicted seven times since the age of 16, had been in prison for 15 years, and had spent 13 months in a workhouse.

== St. Pölten murders ==
With money that he'd made in prison through the manufacture of illegal liquor, Kniesek bought a gas pistol in Vienna and on January 16, 1980 traveled by train to St. Pölten. There he posed as a carpet representative, and took a taxi to the Am Kupferbrunnberg settlement. Arbitrarily, he broke into the villa of the Altreiter family in the Fuchsenkellergasse, where 26-year-old wheelchair-using Walter Altreiter was living. Kniesek held Walter captive in the house. When Walter's 55-year-old mother Gertrude and 24-year-old sister Ingrid came home in the evening, Kniesek overwhelmed them both and bound them in the hallway. Since the mother believed the attack was a robbery, she presented Kniesek with a check for 20,000 schillings.

Shortly thereafter, Kniesek tortured and strangled Walter using his bare hands. Dragging Walter's body from his wheelchair to his mother, Kniesek then proceeded to torture her, finally strangling Gertrude with a noose three hours later. Kniesek abused Ingrid for seven to eleven hours, and then strangled her as well. During post-mortem, Ingrid's body was found to be covered with welts, hematomas, and dozens of burn marks. Before she died, Ingrid answered a telephone call from her fiancé, Lennart. She told him that she was in a hurry, had no time, and had to cancel a scheduled meeting. Kniesek is said to have been in the vicinity during the call. Kniesek also killed the family's cat, and laid down and fell asleep next to his victims.

A 21-year-old lodger who lived with the Altreiters was not present during the attack only because she happened to have exchanged her day off with a colleague, and was therefore at work during the time of Kniesek's attack.

== Capture and condemnation ==
The next morning, Kniesek packed the three bodies into the trunk of the family's Mercedes-Benz and undertook a shopping spree with the redeemed check. In Karlstetten, Kniesek visited a restaurant. Some people became suspicious when they noticed the large amount of cash on the taciturn man, who also wore black gloves which he did not remove during his entire meal. Kniesek also inquired about the next motorway ramp.

An employee noted down the Mercedes' license plate and alerted the gendarmerie, who then visited the Altreiters' estate and discovered a broken window. Since the three residents were also missing, a nationwide search for the car and the family was initiated. Shortly before midnight, a radio patrol car found the Altreiters' Mercedes at the Salzburg Südtiroler Platz, and officers were able to arrest Kniesek and return him to the vehicle. While searching the vehicle, authorities discovered the three bodies in the car's trunk.

After two days, Kniesek finally confessed to having murdered the Altreiter family out of sheer desire to kill. The murders served only his mental satisfaction, and he did not confess to any other murders. He had even forced Gertrude Altreiter to take her heart medicine, so that she would remain conscious to better experience the agony of his torture.

According to investigators, the Altreiter family was victimized by Kniesek purely by accident. Kniesek had shown up at the house of a building contractor and his family, with the pretext of finding out the address of a doctor. The family's dog, however, had deterred him, according to the St. Pölten police commander. Kniesek attempted to kill himself in a cell of the Salzburg provincial court, but was prevented by court officials.

On July 4, 1980, Werner Kniesek was sentenced by the St. Pölten district court to life imprisonment, and was admitted to an institution for the mentally unstable. In 1983, he made a failed escape attempt from Stein Prison.

== Impact on the prison system ==
At a press conference, Minister of Justice Christian Broda commented on the case of Werner Kniesek, stressing the importance of scientific and medical advice in prison, and the fact that if Kniesek had been convicted after January 1, 1975, the triple murder would not have happened. In 1975 the concept of criminal insanity was expanded, so that perpetrators like Kniesek could be accommodated to mental hospitals even beyond the expiration of their criminal sentences. Since the rule of law in Austria prevents new laws from being applied retroactively, dangerous prisoners such as Kniesek could not be included in the enforcement of the new measures.

Therefore, a nine-member working group was formed, which was tasked with identifying prisoners who were sentenced under the penal code prior to 1975, but who would be categorized as mentally abnormal lawbreakers and potential recidivists under the new law. Although these prisoners could not subsequently be held under the new law, they would serve the remainders of their sentences in a special institution.

== Film ==
The film Angst by Gerald Kargl is based on Werner Kniesek's crimes.

== Literature ==
- Andreas Zeppetzauer, Regina Zeppetzauer: Murder. The most spectacular murders in Austria. Stocker publishing house, Graz 2005, ISBN 978-3-85365-215-2.
- Alexandra Wehner: Traces of Evil. Ueberreuter, Vienna 2007, ISBN 978-3-8000-7310-8.
