= Otto Zykan =

Austrian composer and pianist

Otto Matthäus Zykan (29 April 1935, Vienna – 25 May 2006, Sachsendorf, Burgschleinitz-Kühnring) was an Austrian composer and pianist.

== Education ==
The son of composer Otto Zykan (1902–1989), Otto M Zykan received his first piano lessons from his father, and from 1940 he was taught by his paternal grandmother, who had been a student of Theodor Leschetizky. He joined the Vienna Boys Choir and studied at the Vienna Music Academy where his teachers included Karl Schiske (composition), Bruno Seidlhofer and Josef Dichler (piano). He also attended the Darmstadt summer courses (1958, 1964–1966), winning the Kranichstein Music Prize of the international piano competition on his first visit.

== Music theatre ==
In 1967, working with H.K. Gruber and Kurt Schwertsik, Zykan co-founded the Salonkonzerte Group and associated ensembles such as MOB art & tone ART (sometimes termed the 'Third Viennese School') to further his ideas about ‘instrumental theatre’, music that aimed for closer links between performance, music and language. These 'total art productions', influenced by Dadaism and analogous to the music theatre productions of Mauricio Kagel, were often composed in the form of sketch-like drafts. Depending as they did on personal interpretation Zykan discouraged any performances without his direct involvement. The music theatre piece Symphonie aus der Heilen Welt was first produced in 1977. In the same year his satirical television play Staatsoperette, directed by Franz Novotny, caused a scandal.

In 1994 he wrote the electronic score for Hans Hoffer's production of Odysseus, staged at the Linz Festival.

== Other works ==
More conventionally, Zykan also composed opera, orchestral, concerto and instrumental music, as well as film scores. One of his earliest works was a piano concerto using serial techniques, which won a prize at the Innsbruck Youth Culture Week in 1963. His three operas are Singers Nähmaschine ist die beste (1966, of which there is a revised film version, 1973), Kunst kommt von Gönnen (1980) and Auszählreim (1986). His two cello concertos - the first composed in 1982, the second entitled Beethoven's Cello in 2005 - were written for and premiered by the Austrian cellist Heinrich Schiff. His Masse! received its premiere at the Vienna Musikverein in 2002. Film scores include Exit (1980) and Strudlhofstiege (an adaption of the novel by Heimito von Doderer, 1988).

As a pianist, Zykan began touring in 1968. He championed the work of Schoenberg and recorded the complete piano music in 1970. These landmark recordings were re-released in 2023 alongside new recordings of Zykan's own piano music, performed by Duncan Honeybourne.

== Personal life ==
Zykan's partner was the Austrian musicologist and radio producer Irene Suchy. He died while cycling near his home in Sachsendorf, and is buried in the cemetery in Reinprechtspölla.

== Selected works ==
Dramatic

- Sings Nähmaschine ist die beste, opera (1966, rev. 1973)
- Schön der Reihe nach, ballet (1966)
- Lehrstück am Beispiel Schönbergs, music theatre (1974)
- Symphonie der heilen Welt, scenic concerto (1977)
- Exit, film score (1980)
- Kunst kommt von Gönnen, opera (1980)
- Die Orgel der Barbarei, four voices and instruments (1984)
- Auszählreim, opera (1986; rev. 1987)
- Strudlhofstiege, film score (1988)
- Wahr ist, dass der Tiger frisst, choral opera (1994)
- Mesmer, film music (1994)
- Odysseus, incidental music (1994)

Orchestral

- Piano Concerto (1958)
- Kurze Anweisung (1969)
- Concerto for speaker, violin and orchestra (1977)
- Ausgesucht Freundliches, concerto for two soloists, chorus, and orchestra (1979)
- Cello Concerto (1982)
- Beethoven's Cello, 3 movements for cello and orchestra (2005)

Chamber and instrumental

- Cello Sonata (1958)
- 4 String Quartets (1958-1990)
- Kryptomnemie for winds, percussion, and piano (1963)
- 6 Chansons, die keine sind for Piano (1965)
- Kammermusik for 12 Instruments (1965)
- 4 Nachtstück for piano (1968)
- Miles Smiles (1970)
- Trio for Solo Violin (1977)
- Vibraphonstück (1982)

Vocal

- Das Unterösterreichische Liederbuch, 21 songs in three parts, voices and piano (1966 and later)
- Inszene I, conductor, actor and five voices (1967)
- Inszene 2, actor and four voices (1967)
- Rondo: Alles ist Musik was nicht Gymnastik ist for Speaker and tape (1971)
- Inszene 3, eight male voices and tape (1981)
- Die Orgel der Barbarei for 4 singers, soloist, and tuba (1984)
- Engels Engel for 3 vocalists or chorus and tape (1988)
- Masse! (2002)
