= World-Information.Org =

Austrian independent cultural institution

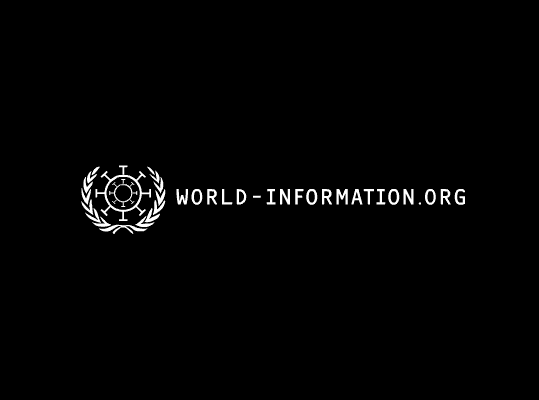
- Formation: 1999
- Purpose: International exhibitions, conferences and publications dealing with culture and technology
- Location: Vienna, Austria
- Website: http://world-information.net/en/

The World-Information Institute (WII) is an independent cultural institution based in Vienna, Austria, established in 1999 and officially launched in 2000. The institute conducts research and organizes various events, including conferences and exhibitions, focusing on digital culture and information technologies.

The World-Information Institute is an international network of partner institutions and experts collaborating in the fields of information and communication technologies and their social implications.

WII’s main research areas involve collecting, organizing, and analyzing information about shared resources and in this context, issues related to intellectual property laws, new ways of creating cultural works, how information is searched and organized, surveillance technologies, big data, and data visualization, cultural and media policies. A recent initiative to improve cultural and media policies is the “Netzpolitischer Konvent” (the Convention of Austrian civil society on net politics), where a list of demands was prepared and shared with the public.

== Projects ==
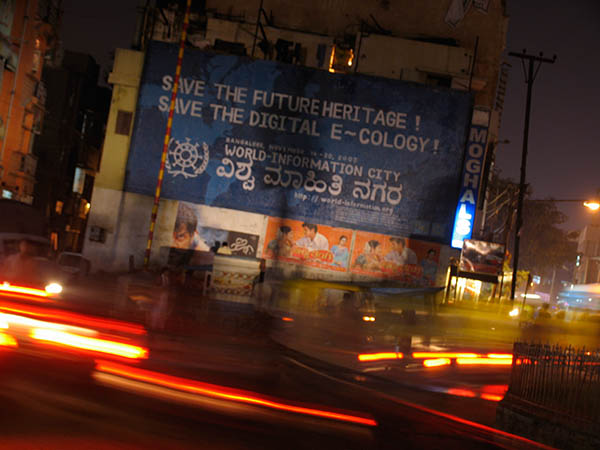
World-Information City in Bengaluru 2005.

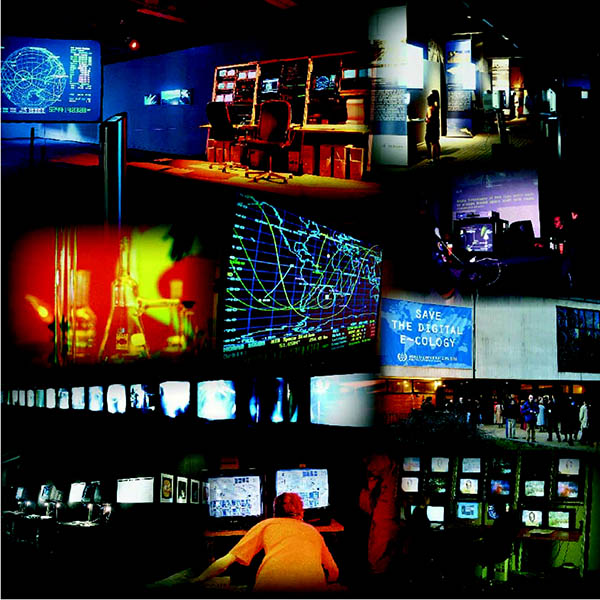
World-Information Exhibition in Brussels, Belgrade, Vienna and Amsterdam 2000 until 2003.

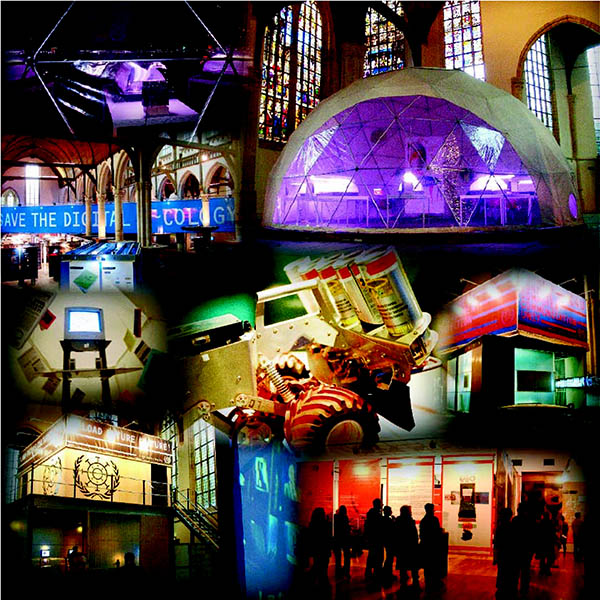
World-Information Exhibition in Brussels, Belgrade, Vienna and Amsterdam 2000-2003.

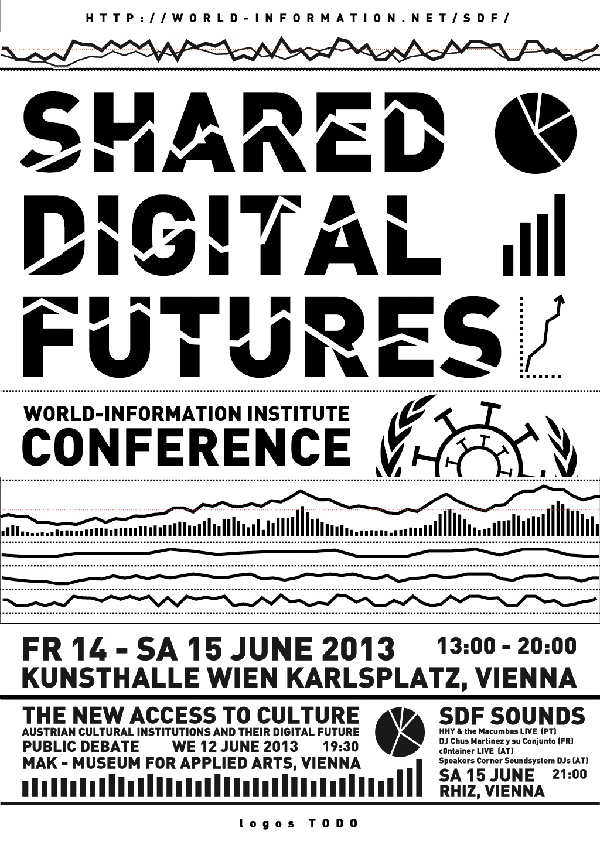
Conference 'Shared Digital Futures'

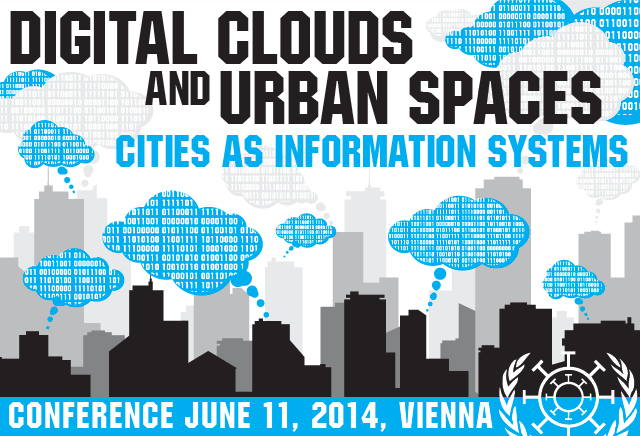
Conference 'Digital Clouds and Urban Spaces'

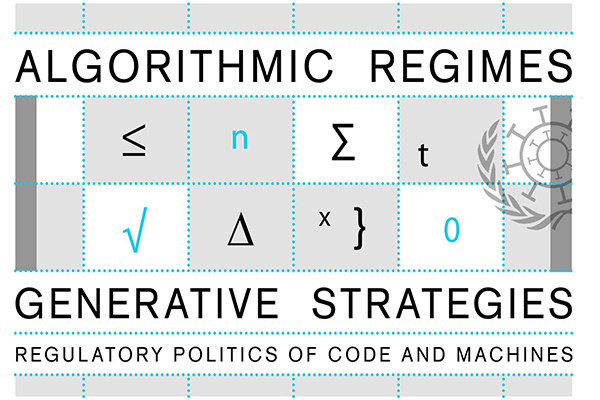
Conference/Project 'Algorithmic Regimes'

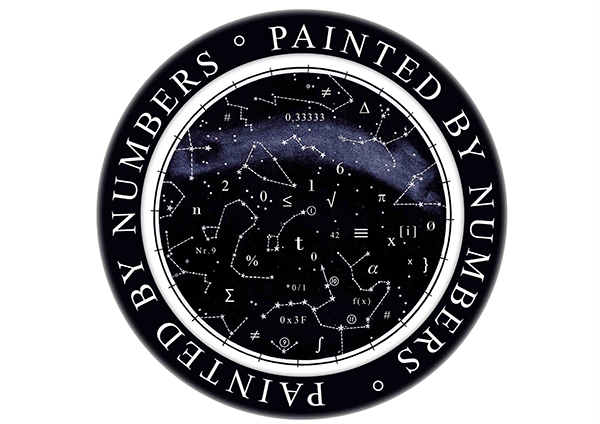
Project 'Painted by Numbers'

=== World-Information.Org series of projects - launched Brussels 2000 ===
World-Information.Org was launched as the main media project of the European Capital of Culture 2000 in Brussels. The social, cultural, and political dimensions of the new information and communication technologies were discussed. The World-Information exhibition presented objects and research results on topics such as the history of modern communication technologies, the "big players" in the IT industry, financial networks, and human rights. The program was completed by the "World-Info Con" conference. Most resources are available on the world-information.org page. The first presentation was followed by a series of conferences and exhibitions in Vienna (Technisches Museum Wien, 2000), Amsterdam (Oude Kerk and De Balie Centre for Culture and Politics, 2002), Novi Sad/Belgrade (Museum of Vojvodina, Museum of Contemporary Art, Belgrade, 2003), Bangalore (2005) and Paris (as part of the festival "Futur en Seine", 2009).

=== Deep Search (I) — Vienna 2008 ===
The "Deep Search" conference dealt with "the social and political dimensions of how we navigate the deep seas of knowledge". Critically analyzing a situation in which Google assumes a monopoly-like position in the field of search in many countries around the world, the conference asked questions such as: "How is computer readable significance produced?", "How is meaning involved in machine communication?", "Where is the emancipatory potential of having access to such vast amounts of information?", "What are the dangers of our reliance on search engines?", and "Are there any approaches that do not follow the currently dominating paradigm of Google?“

=== Critical Strategies in Art and Media - New York, 2009 ===
This conference on the future of cultural freedom and cultural intelligence in digital theory and practice took place at the Austrian Cultural Forum, New York. It followed attempts to go beyond the obsolete models of the artist/author as genius and searched for collective and collaborative practices that could invent new terrains and flows. New kinds of virtual spaces and their role for critical cultural practices were discussed. The conference also aimed at developing strategies that could allude to being instrumentalized by the creative industries in, their seemingly infinite appetite for things "radical".

=== Deep Search (II) — Vienna, 2010 ===
The debate on the policies of searching continued in 2010 with the conference "Deep Search II": "The automatic classification of data, its indexing, and its evaluation are at the heart of new communication environments. What lies beneath is not just a drive to organize the world's information, but also to classify human relations: from the management of the modern workplace and consumers in mass societies, to the bio-political management of the network society."

=== Shared Digital Futures — Vienna, 2013 ===
The conference "Shared Digital Futures" dealt with the impact of digital networking technologies to the production of culture and examined the new role of the artwork as the same end product and raw material for further production of culture, models for sustainable funding of Commons, new forms of collective authorship, and the opportunities opened by the blurring of boundaries between artists and audiences.

=== Information as a reality — Linz, 2014 ===
The conference and exhibition "Information as a reality" in cooperation with the magazine Springerin and with Ars Electronica at the Lentos Art Museum in Linz dealt with critical cultural practices in digital networks and the increasing change of social reality by digital models and virtual information regimes. Cultural workers have played an important pioneering role in the colonization of digital worlds. What role can they assume now, 20 years after the emergence of the Internet?

=== Digital Clouds and Urban Spaces — Vienna, 2014 ===
The conference "Digital Clouds and Urban Spaces" at Architekturzentrum Wien focused on smart cities and the city as an information system, where urbanity is increasingly shaped by networks of informational technologies. The conference took account to the fact, that this does not only apply to phenomena as traffic control systems or planning models, but that the world of work, social spaces and cultural processes are also subject to substantial transformations related to these developments. Before this backdrop, the conference questioned the simplistic promises made by global corporations and their technologies to render cities more efficient, safer and cleaner.

=== Critical Net Practice — Vienna, 2015 ===
In a cooperation with the magazine Springerin World-Information Institute revisited 20 years of net culture. The resulting texts formed the main part of issue XXI/1 (winter 2015) of the magazine. Issue Presentation (MAK – Museum of Applied Arts, Vienna): Critical Net Practice: Information as a reality? Jumper / Band XXI, No. 1, Winter 2015.

=== Algorithmic Regimes - Vienna 2015/2016 ===
The international conference and event series "Algorithmic Regimes" examined the growing influence of digital control systems and their cascading effects of powerful effect on cultural and social realities. In addition to the conference, the event "Algorithms are no Angels" with Matthew Fuller and Graham Harwood, a Video interview with Stefano Harney, and an audiovisual evening about the power of algorithms were conducted, that presented an annotated remix of film clips and documentaries, relating to automated control systems.

=== Wahlkabine.at ===
Wahlkabine.at was founded in 2002 by the Institute for New Culture Technologies/t0 and was presented for the first time during the National Council elections in the same year. The online polling-booth sees itself as an instrument of political education, which encourages the users to deal with political content playfully and provides factual information and feedback opportunities.

Given the fact that increasing personalization nowadays replaces more and more the political content, Wahlkabine.at considers the publication of all party-programs and their scientific contextualization as a fundamental tool for political participation as well as a revealing resource collection for personal reflection on the voting behavior.

Wahlkabine.at focuses on elections on Austrian national and regional levels and on EU-level (European Parliament), but also includes elections of the Austrian National Student Union and a few individual cases (e.g. Austrian Economic Chambers / Sector Information and Consulting 2010). In the context of regional elections in Vienna in autumn 2015 (with an electorate of approximately 1.14 million eligible voters) 160,000 users visited the online polling booth.

=== Future Non Stop ===
Future Non Stop – started as a project in 2010, online since 2012 – is an extensive archive and an experiment in logics of navigating information: “Based on an extensive archive going back to 1994 the site collects materials that serve as important reference documents in the field of new media, politics, and art and makes them accessible to a wider public. Instead of a hierarchically structured archive, an experimental navigation interface opens up new ways to explore large information nodes. Documents are associated by a range of tag that allow to filter relevance according to topics and issue relations. ASCR, short for Advanced Semantic Content Repository, is the open-source information architecture and "editing back end" of Future Non Stop.”

== Initiatives / Sub-organizations and their Projects ==
=== Institute for New Culture Technologies/t0 ===
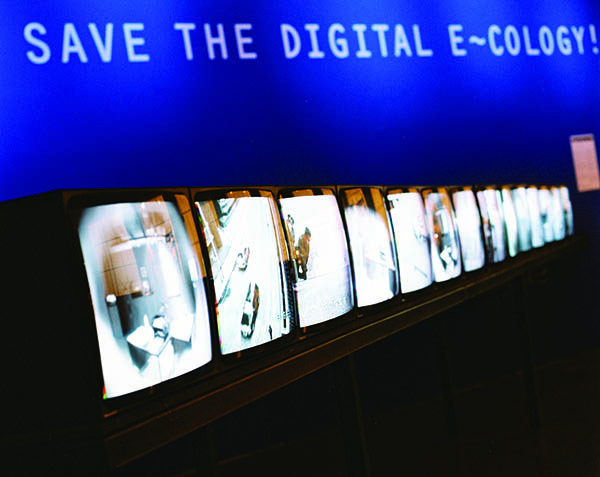
Save the Digital Ecology/ Vienna 2000

The Institute for New Culture Technologies/t0 was established in 1993 as an arts and culture related international competence platform for the critical use of information and communication technologies. Over the years, it has pursued a broad range of transdisciplinary activities. From producing and hosting infrastructure to organizing conferences, festivals and exhibitions, local interventions and skill transfer, as well as international research and publishing. Konrad Becker and Francisco de Sousa Webber, who founded the institute, currently form the board of directors together with Felix Stalder.

== History ==
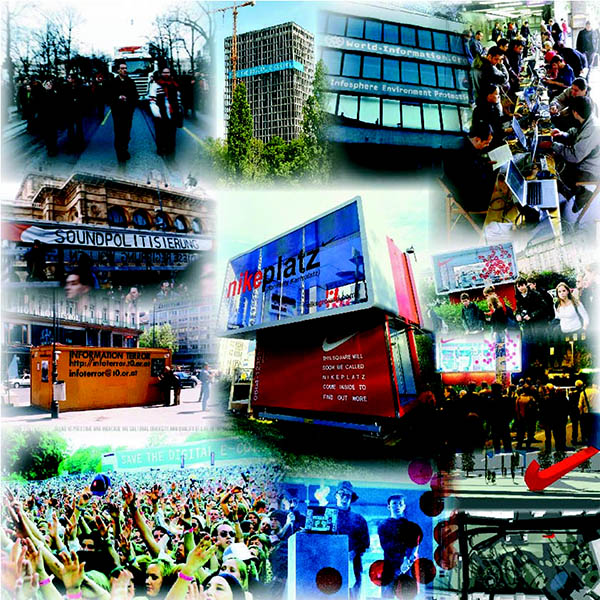
Free Re:Public Soundpolitisierung/Vienna 2002, World-Information/Belgrade 2003, World-Information/ Brussels 2000, Free Bitflows / Vienna 2004, Information Terror / Vienna 1996, Nikeplatz/ Vienna 2003, Save the Digital Ecology/Norway 2001

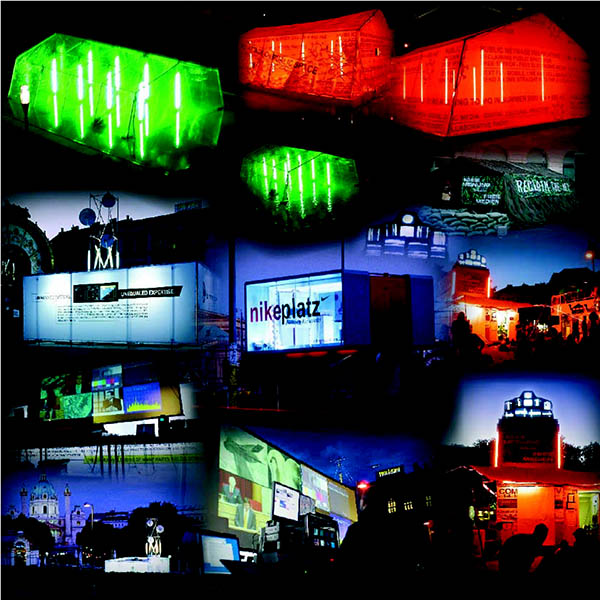
Public Netbase Basecamp I/II/III 2001-2002, System-77 Civil Counter-Reconnaissance/ Vienna 2004, Nikeplatz/ Vienna 2003, Free Media Camp/ Vienna 2003

When the founders of the Institute for New Culture Technologies/t0 set up a web server (in an unofficially tolerated act of ‘misuse’ of the underemployed Internet server of Vienna's general hospital AKH) in 1993, they created one of the first arts and culture-related sites on the emerging World Wide Web.

The institute has been conceptualized as a platform from which independent initiatives and organizations could emerge. The first of these initiatives was Public Netbase — now a "historical example" of an early new media organization in Europe. Founded in 1994, it was located in Messepalast, the predecessor of Vienna's Museumsquartier. It combined various functions and activities: It was a non-profit Internet service provider that facilitated internet access mainly for the independent arts and cultural sector. This was accompanied by a program of workshops and courses to develop media competence. Public Netbase became a social space for this emerging scene of artists, techheads, activists etc., and ran an almost daily evening program of discussions, presentations, screenings and music events. In addition to these grassroots activities, international exhibitions and conferences were conducted. Public Netbase used to be t0's main initiative until it had to be discontinued due to lack of funding (which was a result of repression by the Austrian right-wing government in 2006.

In 1999, however, the next initiative had been founded: World-Information.Org (WIO). It was presented – under the patronage of UNESCO – as the lead project of the New-Media-program of the Brussels 2000 European Capital of Culture. WIO resembles an intelligence agency, that collects and analyses information, but not in the interest of a state or as a think tank for corporate businesses, but for the independent cultural sector. Starting from the Brussels project, a series of international exhibitions and conferences has been developed. World-Information Institute (WII) is WIO's research department. In addition to conducting research, it continues the program of international conferences and the activities to further develop culture and media policies. In addition, on the Austrian national level, wahlkabine.at was founded in 2002 and became Austria's most prominent online “polling booth”.

Since 2010, Institute for New Culture Technologies/t0 has developed the "living archive" Future Non Stop, in which all its activities are documented, which makes it a valuable resource covering twenty years of activities in new media art, net culture and participatory use and critical analyses of new technologies, digital networks and the World Wide Web.

Across all these activities, t0 has closely collaborated with groups and organizations such as Critical Art Ensemble, RTMark, The Yes Men, De Balie, Kuda.org, De Waag, Adbusters, Institute for Applied Autonomy, Sarai (Media Lab), Bundeszentrale für politische Bildung, V2 Institute for the Unstable Media, 0100101110101101.ORG and Nettime. Artists and researchers who have been involved in t0's program, include Saskia Sassen, Bruno Latour, Peter Lamborn Wilson / Hakim Bey, Franco Bifo Berardi, Chantal Mouffe, Brian Holmes, Marko Peljhan, Ben Bagdikian, Marina Gržinić, Arundhati Roy, Manuel De Landa, Michel Bauwens, R. Trebor Scholz, Monica Narula (RAQS Media Collective), Monika Mokre, Femke Snelten and many others.

=== Public Netbase ===
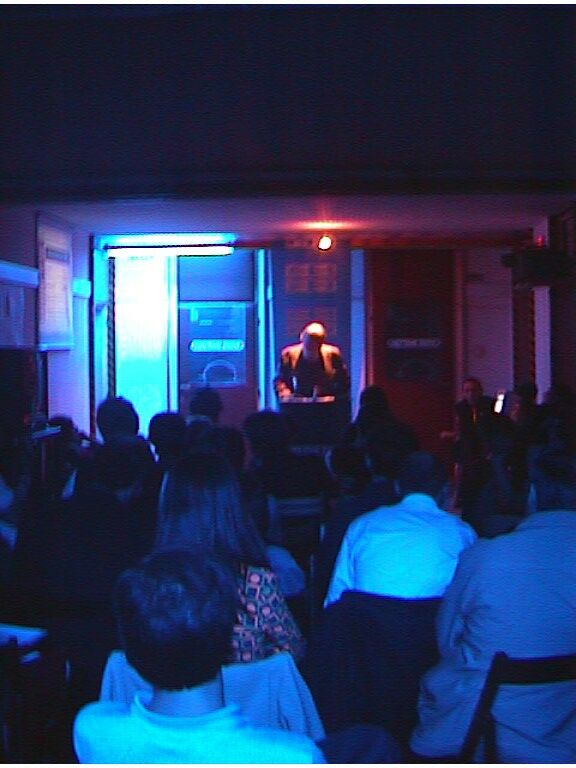
Netbase, media~space

Public Netbase was initiated by the Institute for New Culture Technologies/t0 in the Vienna Museumsquartier in 1994 as a non-profit internet provider and a platform for the participatory use of information and communication technology. With its WWW-server as well as with its workshops, instruction courses, and educational events for the broad public, Public Netbase contributed continually to the evolution of a lively internet scene and a heightened consciousness for the implications of the new communication and information technologies.

As a focal point of European and international art, culture, and media networks, the Viennese net culture institute attempted to develop an understanding for the manifold opportunities and the potential of new communication media, but also to look critically at a society that is increasingly determined by technology.

In addition to the series of workshops and discussions the activities of Public Netbase included, among others, projects that combined exhibitions, conferences and workshops (e.g. Synworld playwork:hyperspace (1999) and Free Bitflows (2004)), projects in public space (nikeground (2003) and Basecamp (2001/2002)) and activities that strengthened self-organization of independent media initiatives and demanded further development of cultural and media policies (in Austria, but also on European level, e.g. European Cultural Backbone (1999-2003)). Public Netbase was very active in the resistance movements against the Austrian right-wing government, that came into power beginning of 2000 and included Jörg Haider's Freedom Party (FPÖ). An own strand of activities derived from this (e.g. government-Austria.at (2000/2001)) and elements of political activism became stronger across all strands of activities.

== Publications ==
- Clemens Apprich, "Upload dissident culture: Public Netbase's interventions into digital and urban space", in: Interface: a journal for and about social movements, Vol. 2(2), November 2010, pp. 79–91, online: http://www.interfacejournal.net/wordpress/wp-content/uploads/2010/12/Interface-2-2-pp.79-91-Apprich.pdf, retrieved: 17 September 2013
- Clemens Apprich / Felix Stalder (Hrsg.): Vergessene Zukunft. Radikale Netzkulturen in Europa. transcript, Bielefeld 2012, ISBN 978-3-8376-1906-5.
- Inke Arns: Netzkulturen, Hamburg (eva), 2002, p. 93, ISBN 3-434-46107-8
- Konrad Becker, Dictionary of Operations. Deep Politics & Cultural Intelligence, New York: Autonomedia 2012, ISBN 9781570272615
- Konrad Becker (Red.): Die Politik der Infosphäre. World-Information.Org, Bonn: Bundeszentrale für politische Bildung 2002, ISBN 978-3-89331-464-5, online: http://www.bpb.de/shop/buecher/schriftenreihe/36071/die-politik-der-infosphaere
- Konrad Becker / Jim Fleming (Eds.): Critical Strategies in Art and Media, New York: Autonomedia 2010, ISBN 978-1-57027-214-1
- Konrad Becker / Felix Stalder (Eds.): Deep Search. The Politics of Search beyond Google, Innsbruck, Vienna, Bozen: Studienverlag, and Piscataway, NJ: Transaction Publishers 2009, ISBN 978-3-7065-4795-6
- Konrad Becker: "Zwang und Verführung in der Kontrollgesellschaft - Selbstvermessung und Wunscherfüllung im digitalen Datenraum", in: Medienimpulse 4/2014 (online: http://www.medienimpulse.at/articles/view/738, retrieved: 19 December 2016)
- Beatrice Beckmann, "Das Medium als bleibende Botschaft. Das Wiener Institut für Neue Kulturtechnologien, Public Netbase, streitet für die Historisierung digitaler Gegenwart", in: Die Welt, 17 February 2000 (online: https://www.welt.de/print-welt/article502869/Das-Medium-als-bleibende-Botschaft.html, retrieved: 16 September 2013)
- Branka Ćurčić / Zoran Pantelić / New Media Center_kuda.org (Ed.): Public Netbase: Non Stop Future - New Practices in Art and Media, Frankfurt a. M. (Revolver), 2008, ISBN 978-3-86588-455-8 (Hardcover)
- Robert Harauer / MEDIACULT (ed.): Digital Culture in Europe. A selective inventory of centres of innovation in the arts and new technologies, Strasbourg (Council of Europe), 1999, ISBN 92-871-3873-7 (in Google books)
- Kritische Netzpraxis (Critical Net Practice). springerin. Hefte für Gegenwartskunst, XXI/1 (winter 2015), (in German; a few texts are available in English online: http://www.springerin.at/dyn/heft.php?id=87&pos=0&textid=0&lang=en, retrieved 22 September 2016)
- Christine Mayer and Martin Wassermair, "wahlkabine.at: Promoting an Enlightened Understanding of Politics", in: Lorella Cedroni and Diego Garzia (eds.): Voting Advice Applications in Europe: The State of the Art, Scriptaweb (2010), https://www.academia.edu/281395/Voting_Advice_Applications_in_Europe_The_State_of_the_Art, retrieved: 16 September 2013
- Werner Reiter, "Die Zukunft war schon mal spannender", The Gap, 22 May 2012, http://www.thegap.at/buchstories/artikel/die-zukunft-war-schon-mal-spannender/ (in German), retrieved: 16 September 2013
- Felix Stalder, Martin Wassermair, Konrad Becker: “Kulturelle Produktion und Mediennutzung im Alltag. Urheberrechtliche Problemfelder und politische Lösungsperspektiven”, Studie im Auftrag der Kammer für Arbeiter und Angestellte für Wien, Wien: AK 2013, http://media.arbeiterkammer.at/wien/PDF/studien/Kulturelle_Produktion_und_Mediennutzung.pdf, retrieved: 16 September 2013 (An interview with co-author Felix Stalder about this study is available in English: “Copyright: ‘Media use in the gray zone’“, futurezone.at, 29 March 2013, http://futurezone.at/english/copyright-media-use-in-the-gray-zone/24.593.691, retrieved: 16 September 2013.)
- Felix Stalder, Digital Solidarity, Mute / PML Books 2013, ISBN 978-1-906496-92-0 (print), 978-1-906496-93-7 (eBook), online: http://www.metamute.org/sites/www.metamute.org/files/u1/Digital-Solidarity-Felix-Stalder-9781906496920-web-fullbook.pdf (retrieved: 8 October 2016)
- Wolfgang Sützl: “World-Information City. Die indische IT-Metropole Bangalore ist Schauplatz eines World-Information.Org-Projekts“, in: kulturrisse 01/2005, online: http://kulturrisse.at/ausgaben/012005/kosmopolitiken/world-information-city.-die-indische-it-metropole-bangalore-ist-schauplatz-eines-world-information.org-projekts
- Wolfgang Sützl & Geoff Cox (eds.), Creating Insecurity. Art and Culture in the Age of Security, DATA browser 04, New York: Autonomedia 2009, ISBN 978-1-57027-205-9
- Vera Tollmann, "Das Paradox der 'sozialen Medien'. Gespräch mit dem Medienwissenschaftler Clemens Apprich über Netzkulturen seit den 1990er- Jahren", in: Springer|in 3/13, pp. 10/11
- Martin Wassermair: "In Austria, the Clock Ticks with a Different Beat": A Short Story of Public Netbase t0, its International Success and Recent Political Struggles, in: Cultivate Interactive, October 2000, online: http://www.cultivate-int.org/issue2/netbase/, retrieved: 16 September 2013
