= Public Netbase =

Austrian media arts organization

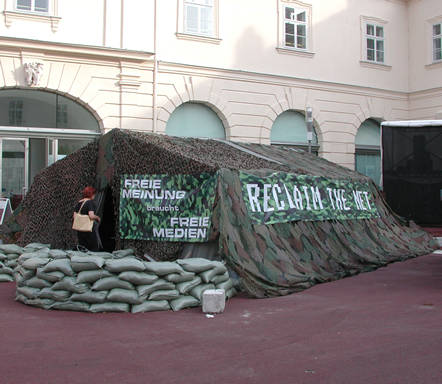
- Formation: 1994
- Founder: Konrad Becker, Francisco de Sousa Webber
- Dissolved: 2006
- Purpose: Internet culture, media art, digital culture
- Location: Vienna, Austria
- Parent organization: Institute for New Culture Technologies/t0

Public Netbase was a Vienna-based media arts and internet culture organization active from 1994 to 2006. It operated as an internet access provider, event venue, exhibition space and cultural initiative concerned with digital media, electronic art, network culture and media politics.

The organization was associated with the Institute for New Culture Technologies/t0, launched in 1994 by Konrad Becker and Francisco de Sousa Webber. In the second half of the 1990s and early 2000s, Public Netbase became part of European discussions around net culture, digital art, open access to communication technologies and internet-based political activism. In 1995, it received an Award of Distinction in the World Wide Web category of the Prix Ars Electronica.

Public Netbase closed in 2006 after a period of conflict over location, infrastructure and public funding. Some related activities continued through the Institute for New Culture Technologies and associated projects such as World-Information.org and wahlkabine.at.

== History ==
=== Founding and early years ===
The Institute for New Culture Technologies/t0 was launched in 1994 by Konrad Becker and Francisco de Sousa Webber. According to media theorist Clemens Apprich, the project initially went online with a server at the Vienna General Hospital before establishing a dedicated culture server at Vienna's former Messepalast, which later became part of the MuseumsQuartier Wien. At this location the project was institutionalized as Public Netbase.

Public Netbase provided internet access, web space, workshops and meeting facilities for artists, cultural workers and media initiatives. It also hosted exhibitions, lectures and public discussions on digital culture and communication technologies.

The designation "t0" was used in connection with the organization's technical and institutional infrastructure. Later accounts often refer interchangeably to Public Netbase, t0 and the Institute for New Culture Technologies, although Public Netbase was the name under which most of the public program became known.

=== Media art and net culture ===
Public Netbase was active during a period in which internet access, online publishing and digital communication were becoming increasingly important for artists and independent cultural initiatives. In 1995, it received an Award of Distinction at the Prix Ars Electronica in the World Wide Web category.

The platform supported web-based art and communication projects and hosted events dealing with media art, electronic culture, public space, biotechnology, automation, surveillance and digital democracy. Josephine Bosma's essay on networked art and media spaces discusses Public Netbase in relation to early net art, access and engagement in digital public space.

Events associated with Public Netbase included the Association of Autonomous Astronauts' Intergalactic Conference in Vienna in 1997, Flesh Machine, a project by Critical Art Ensemble dealing with biotechnology and genetic screening, ROBOTRONIKA in 1998, and SYNWORLD in 1999.

=== Political conflict and public debate ===
Public Netbase also became known for politically oriented media and public-space projects, especially during the period of the ÖVP–FPÖ coalition government formed in 2000. Its activities included online platforms, events and campaigns critical of government policy and of the role of digital media in democratic culture.

In 1998, the organization became the subject of controversy after FPÖ politician Jörg Haider alleged that Public Netbase had hosted child pornography. Public Netbase denied the allegation. Contemporary coverage described the dispute as involving erotic artwork by Austrian artist Christina Göstl, which Haider compared to commercial pornography.

During the early 2000s, Public Netbase supported initiatives critical of the ÖVP–FPÖ government. One such project was government-austria.at, which presented itself as an alternative platform to official government communication and included the Austrian Web Resistance Awards.

=== Loss of location and closure ===
Following the redevelopment of the MuseumsQuartier, Public Netbase did not retain its permanent location within the complex. The organization subsequently faced difficulties related to location, infrastructure and funding.

In October 2004, Heise reported that Public Netbase would dissolve its technical team and suspend technical services from November of that year. A 2004 statement by the Austrian Cultural Council described the threatened shutdown as a loss for art and culture and called for continued support of the institution.

In 2005, the organization adopted the shortened name "Netbase". In 2006, Public Netbase closed. Brian Holmes described the organization in an obituary published by IG Kultur Österreich as active from 1994 to 2006 and as an institution that combined internet infrastructure, exhibitions, conferences and public interventions.

== Activities and selected projects ==
=== World-Information.org ===
In the early 2000s, Public Netbase initiated World-Information.org, a project concerned with the social, political, economic and cultural implications of information technologies. The project later became associated with UNESCO's Digi-Arts program and participated in conferences and exhibitions in Europe.

=== Nikeground ===
Nikeground was a 2003 communication and public-space project developed with the artist collective 0100101110101101.ORG. The project presented a fictional corporate plan to rename Vienna's Karlsplatz as "Nikeplatz" and install a large monument bearing the NikeNike logo. A temporary information pavilion was installed on the square, leading to public debate and media coverage.

According to Springerin, Nike's Austrian press office denied involvement in the project and Nike subsequently took legal action against Public Netbase, demanding €78,000 in damages. The attempt to prohibit the project was initially unsuccessful, with the decision favoring artistic freedom.

=== Free Media Camp ===
The Free Media Camp was established in 2003 at Karlsplatz in Vienna. It addressed the situation of independent and participatory media initiatives and hosted discussions, presentations, concerts and screenings over several months. It was organized by Public Netbase with local cultural and media organizations including IG Kultur Wien, Radio Orange 94.0 and Public Voice Lab.

=== Dark Markets and Open Cultures ===
Dark Markets, held in 2002, was a conference dealing with media politics, information technologies and democratic theory. It addressed the role of the internet in democratic participation, the influence of state and corporate power on digital spaces and debates around digital commons.

Open Cultures, held in 2003, combined conference, workshop and exhibition formats and addressed information politics, open access and the circulation of knowledge.

=== Other projects ===
Other projects associated with Public Netbase included Period After, which connected media initiatives in South-Eastern Europe in the context of the wars in the former Yugoslavia; Basecamp, a series of public-space media installations around the MuseumsQuartier; Free Bitflows, a conference and exhibition project on information flows and open access; and Art!=Bioterrorism, a solidarity project following the arrest of Critical Art Ensemble member Steve Kurtz.

== Legacy ==
Public Netbase is discussed in scholarship and writing on European net culture, media activism and tactical media. The edited volume Vergessene Zukunft. Radikale Netzkulturen in Europa examines European network and media cultures of the 1990s and early 2000s and treats Public Netbase as one of the examples through which Austrian net culture and cultural-political conflict can be understood.

In 2008, New Media Center_kuda.org published Public Netbase: Non Stop Future – New Practices in Art and Media, an edited volume on the organization and its role in digital culture, art and media practices.

Although Public Netbase ceased operating as a physical organization, the Institute for New Culture Technologies continued activities through projects including World-Information.org and the World-Information Institute. Since 2002, it has also been involved in the development and operation of wahlkabine.at, an Austrian online voting advice application.

== Publications about Public Netbase ==
- Clemens Apprich and Felix Stalder, eds. Vergessene Zukunft. Radikale Netzkulturen in Europa. Bielefeld: transcript, 2012. ISBN 978-3-8376-1906-5.
- Branka Ćurčić, Zoran Pantelić and New Media Center_kuda.org, eds. Public Netbase: Non Stop Future - New Practices in Art and Media. Frankfurt am Main: Revolver, 2008. ISBN 978-3-86588-455-8.
- Josephine Bosma, "Constructing Media Spaces. The novelty of net(worked) art was and is all about access and engagement", Media Art Net, 2004.
- Clemens Apprich, "Interventionen im Datenraum: Public Netbase (1994–2006)", in Hans-Joachim Lenger, Michaela Ott, Sarah Speck and Harald Strauß, eds., Virtualität und Kontrolle. Hamburg: Textem, 2010.
- Martin Wassermair, "Public Netbase: Wem gehört die Kultur der Zukunft?", in Elke Bippus and Andrea Sick, eds., Industrialisierung < > Technologisierung von Kunst und Wissenschaft. Bielefeld: transcript, 2005.
- Martin Wassermair, "Culture and Deviation. Artistic dissidence in Austria", Umělec, 2009/2.
