= Exit... nur keine Panik =

1980 film by Franz Novotny

Exit... nur keine Panik (German for Exit – But Don't Panic) is a 1980 Austrian tragi-comic gangster film, directed by Franz Novotny. It has become a cult film.

== Plot ==
Kirchhoff is a street crook living in Vienna. He dreams of having his own coffee house and being loved by many beautiful women.

== Production and legacy ==
The music was composed by Otto M. Zykan.

Fifteen years later, a sequel to the film was released: Exit II - Verklärte Nacht. In 2007, Exit... nur keine Panik was made available on DVD.

== Cast ==
- Hanno Pöschl as Kirchhoff
- Paulus Manker as Plachinger
- Isolde Barth as Gerti
- Eddie Constantine as Poigrard
- Peter Weibel as Langner
- Kurt Kren as Voyeur
- Hans Georg Nenning as Man on U-Bahn
- Franz Suhrada as Waiter
- Sabrina Thurm as Girl
- Ulli Neumann
- Konrad Becker
- Peter Turrini
- Ernst Schmidt, Jr.
- Peter Patzak
- Curt A. Tichy
