= I Love Vienna =

1991 film

- Directed by: Houchang Allahyari
- Written by: Houchang Allahyari
- Starring: Fereydoun Farrokhzad
- Release date: 1991
- Running time: 104 minutes
- Country: Austria
- Language: German

I Love Vienna is a 1991 Austrian comedy film directed by Houchang Allahyari. The film was selected as the Austrian entry for the Best Foreign Language Film at the 64th Academy Awards, but was not accepted as a nominee.

== Cast ==
- Fereydoun Farrokhzad as Ali Mohamed
- Houchang Allahyari as Carpet salesman
- Marjam Allahyari as Marjam Mohamed
- Niki List as Herr Mitterbauer
- Marisa Mell as Selina
- Michael Niavarani as Ali Mohamed's nephew
- Hanno Pöschl as Rudolf Swoboda
- Trude Marlen as Frau Bechstein
- Thomas Unger-Morris as Policeman
- Günther Baumann as First interrogator
- Alwis Gallé as Second interrogator
- Haymon Maria Buttinger as Car driver
- Gesa Gross as Judith

== See also ==
- List of submissions to the 64th Academy Awards for Best Foreign Language Film
- List of Austrian submissions for the Academy Award for Best Foreign Language Film
