= Ute Bock =

Austrian educator and humanitarian

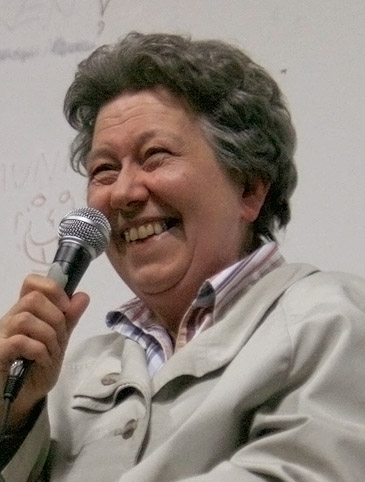
- Bock in 2009
- Born: June 27, 1942; Linz, Alpine and Danube Reichsgaue, German Reich
- Died: January 19, 2018 (aged 75); Vienna, Austria
- Occupations: Educator; humanitarian

Ute Bock (27 June 1942 – 19 January 2018) was an Austrian educator who was known for her projects helping asylum seekers.

== Biography ==
Bock was born in Linz. After high school graduation, she applied for a job at the municipality of Vienna and could start working as an educator. From 1962 until 1969, she worked in a school in Vienna. Afterwards, she started working for the youth care center Zohmanngasse in the Viennese district Favoriten and in 1976, she was appointed as its director. In the early 1990s, the youth welfare office increasingly sent youth with migration backgrounds to Ute Bock's center, also because they had already been turned away by other schools. This is when Bock started being involved in activism and humanitarian help for asylum seekers.

In 1999, during a raid on her centre, about 30 young Africans were arrested for drug trafficking under the controversial "Operation Spring". Ute Bock herself was charged with banditry and drug trafficking, too. This led to her being temporarily suspended from duty. Later the charges were dropped, though she was forbidden to accommodate other African asylum seekers in her center. She then organised private residential communities, which she self-funded and supervised.

In 2000 she retired, but continued working on her project. 2002 she founded her own NGO Flüchtlingsprojekt Ute Bock ("refugee project Ute Bock"). Over 350 asylum seekers find accommodation in Ute Bock's organised apartments. Another 1,000 homeless asylum seekers have their mailing address at her NGO's address. She made legal advice available to her clients.

The NGO relies on donations. In Vienna, the campaign Bock auf Bier was started, in which a small percentage of the price of a beer was given to Bock's housing projects for asylum seekers. Bock auf Bier is a slang expression for Wanting a beer, but Bock Beer stands for a specially strong beer

In 2012, president Heinz Fischer awarded her the Decoration of Honour for Services to the Republic of Austria, Austria's highest national honorary award.

In December 2013 she suffered from a stroke and was unable to be as active as she had been before, which led her NGO into financial difficulties. Several flats could not be paid anymore and some asylum seekers had to change accommodation. In order for donations to be revived, she started working again in 2014. In 2018, she died in Vienna, aged 75.

== Movies ==
Two films have been made about Ute Bock:

- The documentary Bock for President was released in 2019. It was shown for the first time as a preview in cooperation between Stadtkino and the Vienna International Film Festival during the 2009 student protests in Austria in the then occupied lecture hall of the University of Vienna. The official premiere took place as part of the Vienna International Film festival at the Künstlerhaus cinema on November 1, in the Austrian cinemas the film was shown on January 15, 2010.
- In November 2010, the feature film Die verrückte Welt der Ute Bock (The crazy world of Ute Bock) was released. It was directed by Houchang Allahyari and starred Josef Hader, Karl Markovics, Viktor Gernot, Andreas Vitasek, Julia Stemberger, Dolores Schmidinger, Peter Kern and Alexander Pschill. The film depicts Bock's work as well as stories of people she meets, both refugees as well as police.

== Awards ==
Bock won several awards for her social implication:

- 1999: Ute Bock Award for Moral Courage Zivilcourage
- 2000: UNHCR-Refugee-Award
- 2002: Bruno Kreisky Award
- 2003: Karl Renner Prize and Greinecker Seniorenpreis
- 2005: One of the five Austrian women, who were selected for the project Peace Women Across the Globe 2007
- 2007: International Human Award
- 2012: Decoration of Honour for Services to the Republic of Austria

== Publications ==
- with Cornelia Krebs (ed.): Ute Bock. Die Geschichte einer Flüchtlingshelferin. Vienna: Molden, 2010, ISBN 978-3-85485-268-1.
