= Xaver Schwarzenberger =

Austrian cinematographer

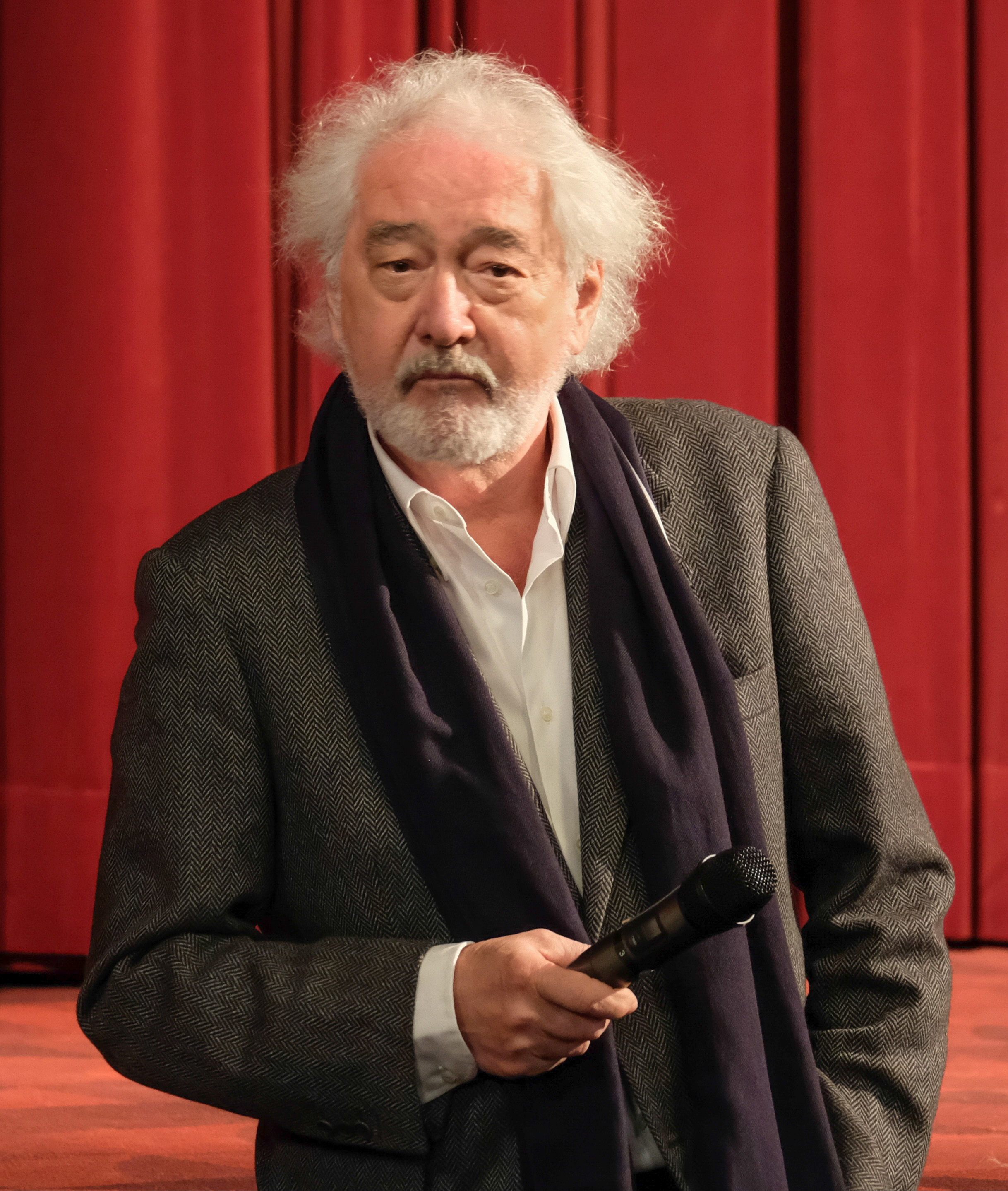
- Born: 21 April 1946 (age 80); Vienna, Austria
- Occupations: Cinematographer, film director
- Years active: 1970–present

Xaver Schwarzenberger (born 21 April 1946) is an Austrian cinematographer and film director. He has worked on more than 100 films since 1970. His 1983 film Der Stille Ozean was entered into the 33rd Berlin International Film Festival, where it won the Silver Bear for an outstanding single achievement.

== Selected filmography ==
- The First Day (1971, directed by Herbert Holba)
- Berlin Alexanderplatz (1980, TV miniseries, directed by Rainer Werner Fassbinder)
- Lili Marleen (1981, directed by Rainer Werner Fassbinder)
- Lola (1981, directed by Rainer Werner Fassbinder)
- Veronika Voss (1982, directed by Rainer Werner Fassbinder)
- Kamikaze 1989 (1982, directed by Wolf Gremm)
- Querelle (1982, directed by Rainer Werner Fassbinder)
- Ace of Aces (1982, directed by Gérard Oury)
- Der Stille Ozean (1983, directed by Xaver Schwarzenberger)
- Le Marginal (1983, directed by Jacques Deray)
- Donauwalzer (1984, TV film, directed by Xaver Schwarzenberger)
- Die Nacht (1985, directed by Hans-Jürgen Syberberg)
- Otto – Der Film (1985, directed by Otto Waalkes and Xaver Schwarzenberger)
- Momo (1986, directed by Johannes Schaaf)
- Franza (1986, TV film, directed by Xaver Schwarzenberger)
- Storms in May (1987, TV film, directed by Xaver Schwarzenberger)
- Ödipussi (1988, directed by Vicco von Bülow)
- With the Next Man Everything Will Be Different (1989, directed by Xaver Schwarzenberger)
- Schtonk! (1992, directed by Helmut Dietl)
- Die skandalösen Frauen (1993, TV film, directed by Xaver Schwarzenberger)
- Tafelspitz (1994, directed by Xaver Schwarzenberger)
- Die Nacht der Nächte (1995, TV film, directed by Xaver Schwarzenberger)
- Bella Ciao (1997, TV film, directed by Xaver Schwarzenberger)
- Lamorte (1997, TV film, directed by Xaver Schwarzenberger)
- Single Bells (1997, TV film, directed by Xaver Schwarzenberger)
- Krambambuli (1998, TV film, directed by Xaver Schwarzenberger)
- Fever (1998, TV film, directed by Xaver Schwarzenberger)
- Andreas Hofer (2002, TV film, directed by Xaver Schwarzenberger)
- Eine Liebe in Afrika (2003, TV film, directed by Xaver Schwarzenberger)
- Margarete Steiff (2005, TV film, directed by Xaver Schwarzenberger)
- Sisi (2009, TV film, directed by Xaver Schwarzenberger)
- A Deal with Adele (2012, TV film, directed by Xaver Schwarzenberger)
