= Paola Loew =

Austrian actress

- Born: 18 February 1934; Trieste, Italy
- Died: 13 January 1999 (age 64); Vienna, Austria
- Occupation: Actress

Paola Loew (1934–1999) was an Austrian stage and film actress.

== Early life and career ==
Born in the Italian city of Trieste, she was educated in London and Buenos Aires. She made her screen debut in Argentine cinema, before emigrating to Germany where she starred in several films during the 1950s. However, much of her career was dedicated to the theatre.

== Personal life ==
Loew was married to the pianist, Friedrich Gulda, from 1956 to 1966; they had two sons, David Wolfgang and Paul.

== Filmography ==
- The Soul of the Children (1951)
- The Orchid (1951)
- Paradise (1953)
- End of the Month (1953)
- Columbus Discovers Kraehwinkel (1954)
- The Missing Miniature (1954)
- A Life for Do (1954)
- The Great Waltz (1972), as Princess Pauline Metternich
- Der Stille Ozean (1983)
- Das zweite Schraube-Fragment (1985)

== Bibliography ==
- Goble, Alan. The Complete Index to Literary Sources in Film. Walter de Gruyter, 1999.
