= Yu (film) =

2003 film

- Directed by: Franz Novotny
- Written by: Michael Grimm; Franz Novotny
- Starring: André Eisermann
- Cinematography: Andreas Hutter
- Release date: 12 September 2003
- Running time: 84 minutes
- Country: Austria
- Language: German

Yu is a 2003 Austrian drama film directed by Franz Novotny. It was entered into the 25th Moscow International Film Festival.

== Cast ==
- André Eisermann as Chris
- Gedeon Burkhard as Tom
- Marina Bukvicki
- Nikola Djuricko
- Vanja Ejdus
- Dejan Lutkic
- Ana Maljevic as Sonja
- Ivana Mrvaljevic
- Ljubisa Samardzic
- David Scheller as Alex
- Ana Stefanovic as Jelena
