= The Missing Miniature =

1954 film

- Directed by: Carl-Heinz Schroth
- Written by: Erich Kästner
- Produced by: Klaus Stapenhorst
- Starring: Paola Loew; Ralph Lothar; Paul Westermeier
- Cinematography: Ekkehard Kyrath
- Edited by: Fritz Stapenhorst; Ilse Wilken
- Music by: Hans-Martin Majewski
- Production company: Carlton-Film
- Distributed by: Europa Film
- Release date: 25 December 1954
- Running time: 83 minutes
- Country: West Germany
- Language: German

The Missing Miniature (German: Die verschwundene Miniatur) is a 1954 West German comedy crime film directed by Carl-Heinz Schroth and starring Paola Loew, Ralph Lothar and Paul Westermeier. It is based on the 1935 story of the same name by Erich Kästner. It was shot at the Carlton Studios in Munich and on location in Copenhagen, Lübeck and Hanover. The film's sets were designed by the art directors Max Mellin and Wolf Englert.

== Synopsis ==
While on holiday in Copenhagen, a butcher meets a young woman in a café and agrees to transport a miniature painting back to Germany for her. This soon leads to complications.

== Cast ==
- Paola Loew as Irene Truebner
- Ralph Lothar as Rudolf Struwe
- Paul Westermeier as Fleischermeister Külz
- Paul Bildt as Steinhövel
- Lina Carstens as Frau Külz
- Hubert von Meyerinck as Tänzer
- Liesl Karlstadt
- Wolf Ackva
- Hildegard Busse
- Elisabeth Goebel
- Heini Göbel
- Willem Holsboer
- Bruno Hübner
- Bum Krüger
- Henry Lorenzen
- Karl-Heinz Peters
- Erich Ponto
- Ernst Rotmund
- Arnulf Schröder

== Bibliography ==
- Bock, Hans-Michael & Bergfelder, Tim. The Concise Cinegraph: Encyclopaedia of German Cinema. Berghahn Books, 2009.
