= Hanno Pöschl =

Austrian actor

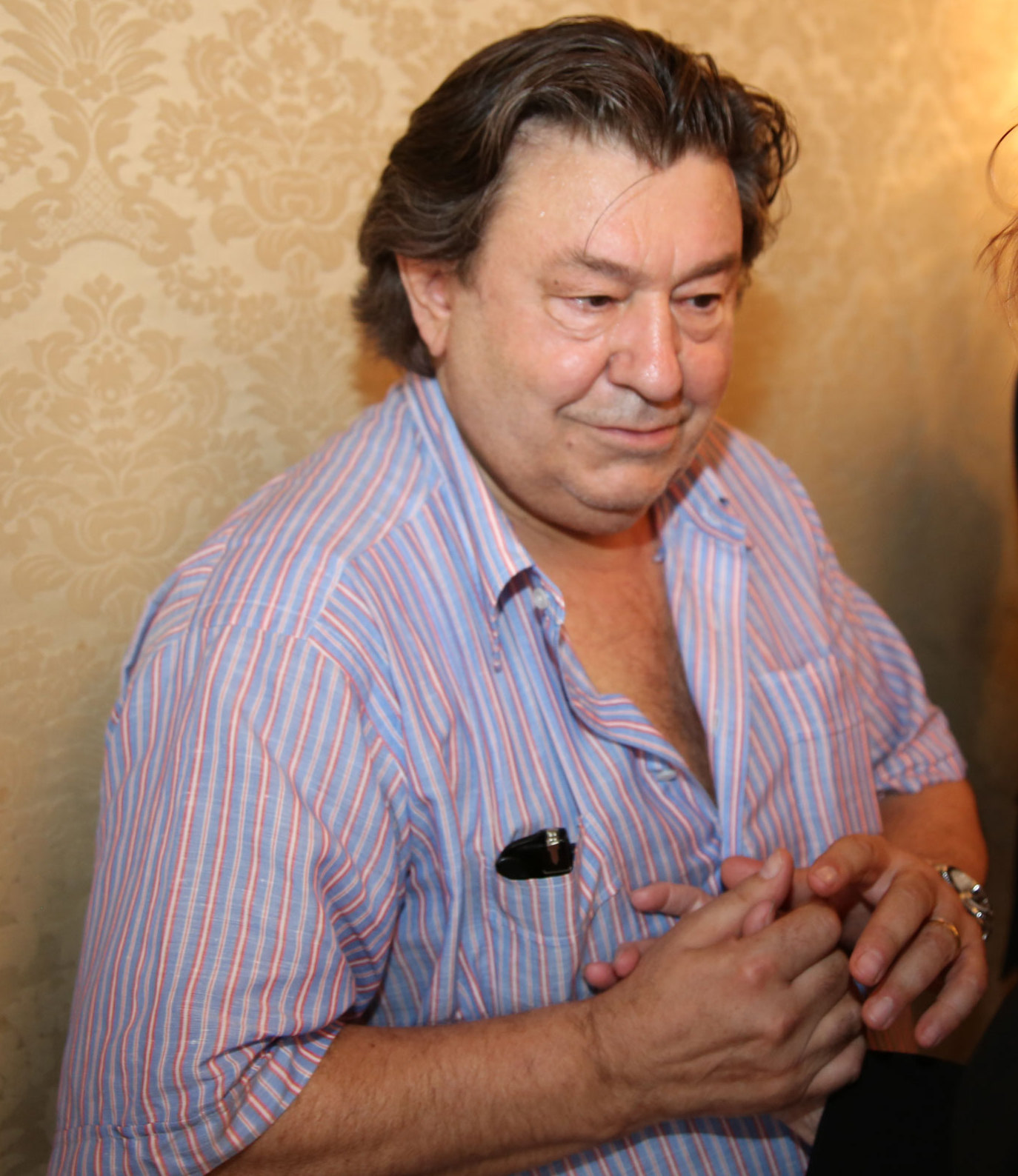
Pöschl in 2015

Hanno Pöschl (born 2 July 1949) is an Austrian actor.

Born in Vienna, Pöschl has enjoyed a long career working with directors Maximilian Schell, Peter Patzak, Rainer Werner Fassbinder, Paulus Manker, Richard Linklater, and Götz Spielmann. He also starred in several TV productions, and has occasionally appeared in theatrical productions at Vienna's Burgtheater and elsewhere.

For many years Pöschl was married to American dancer and choreographer Kim Duddy. He owns a café and a restaurant in Vienna.

== Selected filmography ==
- Kassbach – Ein Porträt (1979) as Kassbach's friend
- Tales from the Vienna Woods (1979) as Alfred
- Exit... nur keine Panik (1980) as Kirchhoff
- Years Passed (1981, TV film) as Ila
- Frankfurt: The Face of a City (1981) as Johnny Klewer
- Querelle (1982) as Robert / Gil
- Der Stille Ozean (1983, TV film) as Dr. Ascher
- Wagner (1983, TV miniseries) as police spy
- Tramps (1983) as Rainer
- Rallye Paris-Dakar (1984) as Mike
- Coconuts (1985) as Grein
- Via Mala (1985, TV miniseries) as Wirt
- Ticket to Rome (1986, TV film) as David
- Schmutz (1987)
- Zockerexpress (1991) as Harry
- Ilona und Kurti (1991) as Kurti
- I Love Vienna (1991) as Rudolf Swoboda
- Inspector Rex: Murder in Schönbrunn (1994, TV episode) as Franz Karasek
- Before Sunrise (1995) as husband on train
- Revanche (2008) as Konecny
