= Erwin Leder =

Austrian actor

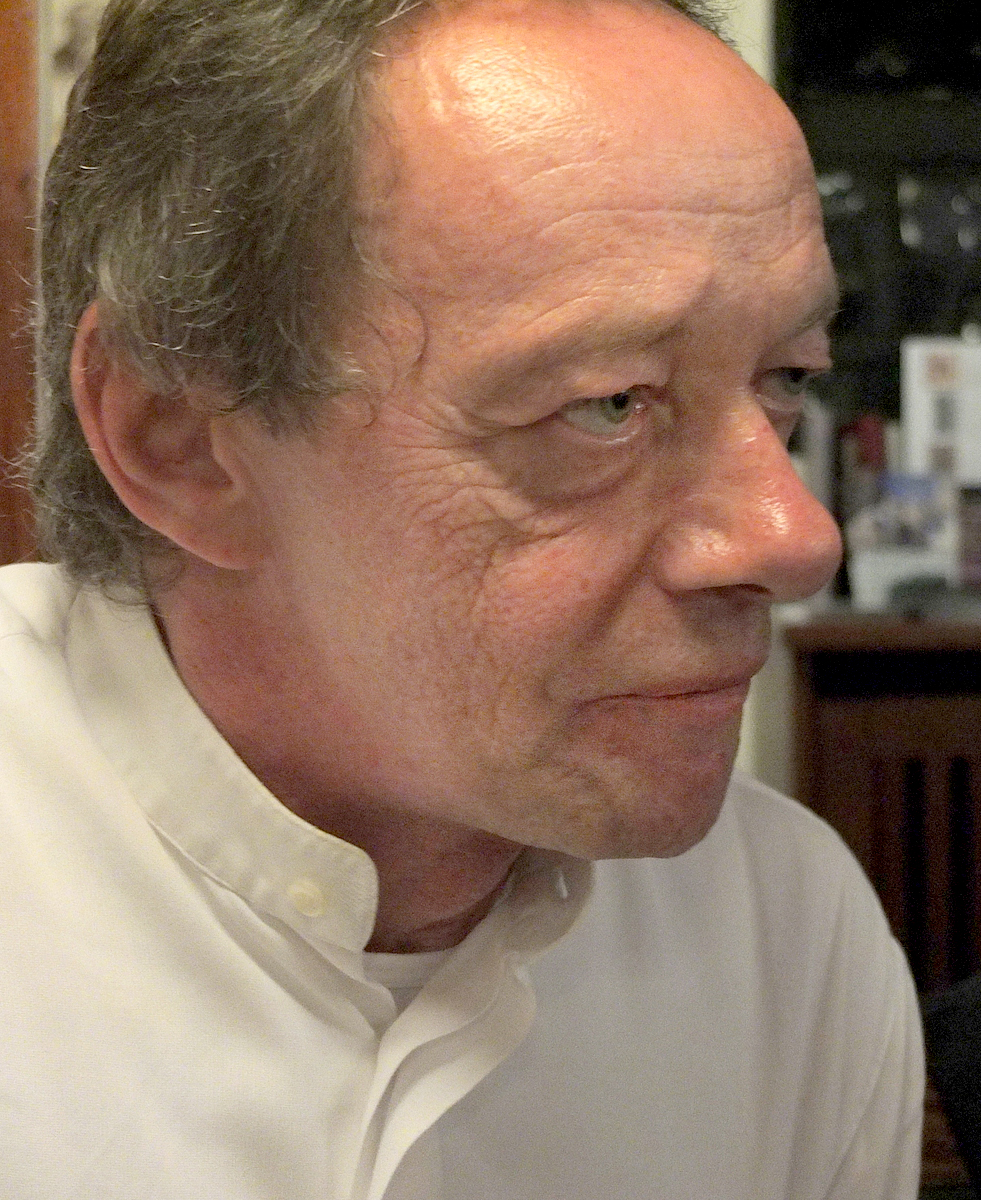
- Erwin Leder in 2012
- Born: 30 July 1951 (age 74); St. Pölten, Austria
- Occupation: Actor
- Years active: 1981–present

Erwin Alois Robert Leder (born 30 July 1951 in St. Pölten, Lower Austria, Austria) is an Austrian actor. He is best known for his role as Chief Mechanic Johann in Das Boot, a 1982 feature film directed by Wolfgang Petersen about a mission of one World War II U-boat and its crew. He is also known for the leading role as the nameless serial killer in the highly acclaimed cult film Angst, by Gerald Kargl, which was banned all over Europe for extreme violence in 1983.

In 2003, Leder appeared as the lycan scientist Singe in the gothic horror/action film Underworld. He reprised his role in the sequel in a brief cameo as a corpse.

== Filmography ==
Year	Title	Role	Notes
1977	Der Einstand	Fritz	TV film
1979	Feuer!	Ferdinand	TV film
1981	Das Boot	Johann	
1982	The Last Revenge	Weltkenner	
1983	Angst	K., the Psychopath	
1985	Mary Ward	Sterbender Soldat	
1989	Die toten Fische		
1989	Eis	Sandor	
1991	Im Dunstkreis		
1993	Krücke	Betrunkener	
1993	The Three Musketeers	Peasant	
1993	Schindler’s List	SS Waffen Officer	
1994	Die Knickerbocker-Bande: Das sprechende Grab	Rudolfo Conté	
1994	Also schlafwandle ich am hellichten Tage		
1995	Internationale Zone		
1997	The Unfish	Gendarm Hermann	
1997	Die Schuld der Liebe	Deutscher Polizist	
1998	Vom Luxus der Liebe		
2001	White Cherries	Orlando	
2003	Underworld	Singe	
2005	Happy End.	Vater	
2006	Klimt	Male Nurse	
2006	Taxidermia	Krisztián	
2006	Gefangene	Tankwart	
2006	Chien Fuck!		
2006	Underworld: Evolution	Singe	
2007	Gay Hell at Dante Café	Talking Vampire	
2007	The Three Robbers	Kutscher	Voice
2008	L'amour toujours	Pygor	
2009	Spielzeugland Endstation	Nummer 28	
2010	Der Atem des Himmels	Ernas Father	
2011	Das schlafende Mädchen	Knitter	
2011	Katharsis	Siegfried Lugman	
2011	Neugierde		
2014	Kafka's The Burrow	Penner	
2015	PPPasolini Epilog	Pier Paolo Pasolini	
2015	PPPasolini	Pier Paolo Pasolini	
2016	The Chronicles of Melanie	Jacob	
2016	Ungehorsam	Monsignore	
2018	Goliath96	Straßenprediger	
2019	Portae Infernales	Inspector Faber	(Segment "Die Bruderschaft des östlichen Tores")
