= Der Stille Ozean =

1983 film

- Directed by: Xaver Schwarzenberger
- Written by: Walter Kappacher; Gerhard Roth (novel)
- Produced by: Alfred Nathan; Werner Swossil
- Starring: Hanno Pöschl; Marie-France Pisier
- Cinematography: Xaver Schwarzenberger
- Edited by: Ulrike Schwarzenberger
- Release date: February 1983
- Running time: 92 minutes
- Country: Austria
- Language: German

Der Stille Ozean is a 1983 Austrian drama film directed by Xaver Schwarzenberger. It was entered in the 33rd Berlin International Film Festival, where it won the Silver Bear for Outstanding Single Achievement.

== Cast ==
- Hanno Pöschl as Dr. Ascher
- Marie-France Pisier as Florence
- Johannes Thanheiser as Rogy
- Bruno Dallansky as Hofmeister
- Marius Cella as Lüscher
- Bert Breit as Zeiner
- Maria Emo as Witwe Egger
- Paola Loew as 1. Schwester
- Maria Martina as 2. Schwester
- Gerlinde Ully as Regina
- Liliana Nelska as Frau Melzer
- Emanuel Schmied as Gendarm Hofmeister
- Herbert Steinmetz as Arzt
