= Tramps (1983 film) =

1983 film

- Film poster
- Directed by: Peter Patzak
- Written by: Wolfgang Ainberger
- Starring: Elliott Gould
- Cinematography: Dietrich Lohmann
- Release date: 4 November 1983
- Running time: 88 minutes
- Country: Austria
- Language: German

Tramps (German: Die letzte Runde) is a 1983 Austrian drama film directed by Peter Patzak. The film was selected as the Austrian entry for the Best Foreign Language Film at the 56th Academy Awards, but was not accepted as a nominee.

== Cast ==
- Elliott Gould as Willie Zobel
- Heinz Moog as Josef Luft
- Andrea Jonasson as Willie's Wife
- Danny Hirsch as Tommi Zobel (as Dany Hirsch)
- Klaramaria Skala as Josef's Wife (as Klara Maria Skala)
- Hanno Pöschl as Rainer
- András Gönczöl as Erwin
- Erni Mangold as Willies Bekanntschaft

== See also ==
- List of submissions to the 56th Academy Awards for Best Foreign Language Film
- List of Austrian submissions for the Academy Award for Best Foreign Language Film
