= Konrad Becker =

Austrian media artist and musician (born 1959)

Konrad Becker (born 9 January 1959 in Vienna) is an Austrian media researcher, artist, author, composer, producer and actor working in the field of art and electronic media. He is director of the Institute for New Culture Technologies/t0 and the World-Information Institute / World-Information.Org, and was co-founder and chairman of Public Netbase, which operated from 1994 to 2006.

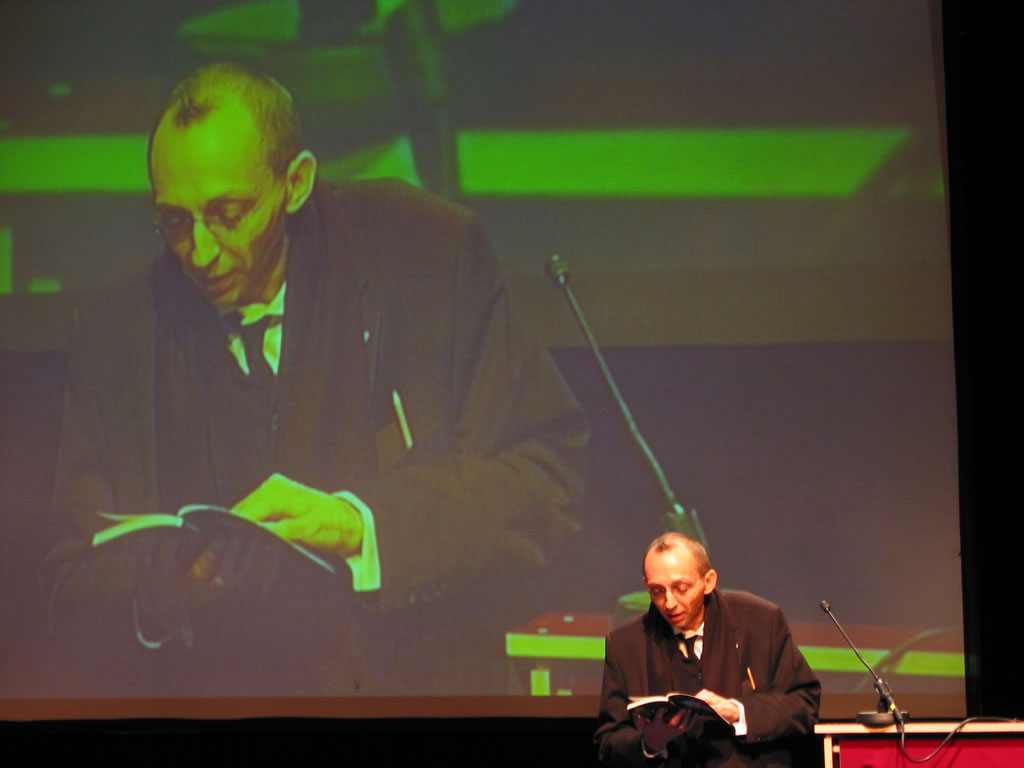
Konrad Becker at World-Information.Org, Amsterdam, 2002.

== Music and acting ==
As an actor, Becker appeared in Austrian and German film and television productions. His film roles include Kassbach – Ein Porträt (1979), Exit... nur keine Panik (1980) and the role of Bockstiegel in Wolfgang Petersen's anti-war film Das Boot (1981).

In 1979 Becker founded the electronic music project Monoton. The project released Monotonprodukt 07 in 1982. In 1998, The Wire included the album in its list of “100 records that set the world on fire”.

== Art, media and research ==
Since 1979, Becker has been active in electronic media as an artist, writer, composer, curator, producer and organizer of intermedia productions, exhibitions and events. His work has included audio, video, television, radio, multimedia installations, software, virtual reality and social interventions.

Becker's work has dealt with electronic art, media culture, information politics and the social implications of technology. He has published theoretical texts, lectured at universities and cultural institutions, and participated in conferences and symposia on media, culture and information technologies.

== Institute for New Culture Technologies/t0, Public Netbase and World-Information.Org ==
Becker is associated with the Institute for New Culture Technologies/t0 and with several media-culture initiatives in Vienna. Public Netbase, co-founded by Becker and Francisco de Sousa Webber, operated from 1994 to 2006 as a platform for digital culture, net art and media activism.

The Institute for New Culture Technologies/t0 and its related projects included Public Netbase and World-Information.Org. The current World-Information Institute describes its focus as digital culture, information politics, research and knowledge transfer.

Becker has conceptualized conferences, exhibitions and research projects in the fields of media culture, information politics and digital networks. His theoretical work includes books on cultural intelligence, information politics and social control.

== Selected publications ==
- Konrad Becker and Martin Wassermair, eds. Kampfzonen in Kunst und Medien. Löcker, Vienna, 2008. ISBN 978-3-85409-483-8.
- Konrad Becker and Felix Stalder, eds. Deep Search: The Politics of Search beyond Google. Studienverlag, Innsbruck, 2009. ISBN 978-3-7065-4795-6.
- Strategic Reality Dictionary: Deep Infopolitics and Cultural Intelligence. Autonomedia, New York, 2009. ISBN 978-1-57027-202-8.
- Konrad Becker and Martin Wassermair, eds. Phantom Kulturstadt. Löcker, Vienna, 2009. ISBN 978-3-85409-506-4.
- Konrad Becker and Martin Wassermair, eds. Nach dem Ende der Politik. Löcker, Vienna, 2011. ISBN 978-3-85409-552-1.
- Dictionary of Operations: Deep Politics and Cultural Intelligence. Autonomedia, New York, 2012. ISBN 978-1-57027-261-5.
- Konrad Becker and Martin Wassermair, eds. Fiktion und Wirkungsmacht. Löcker, Vienna, 2016. ISBN 978-3-85409-663-4.

== Filmography ==
Year	Title	Role	Notes
1979	Kassbach – Ein Porträt	Son	
1980	Exit... nur keine Panik		
1981	Das Boot	Bockstiegel	
