= The First Day (film) =

1971 film

- Directed by: Herbert Holba
- Written by: Herbert Holba
- Starring: Ariane Niehoff
- Cinematography: Xaver Schwarzenberger
- Release date: 1971
- Running time: 76 minutes
- Country: Austria
- Language: German

The First Day (German: Die ersten Tage) is a 1971 Austrian drama film directed by Herbert Holba. It was entered into the 21st Berlin International Film Festival.

== Cast ==
- Ariane Niehoff - Das Mädchen
- Olga Felber - Die Erniedrigte
- Heinz Herki - Der Tor
- Karlheinz Hayek - Der Flüchtling
- Gerhard Stingl - Der Einzelgänger
- Wolfgang Karner - Der komische Reiter
- Peter Kadluz - Der weniger komische Reiter
- Wilhelm Pellert - Der Anführer
- Nora Aschacher - Das lustige Mädchen
- Ingeborg Staudt - Ihre Freundin
- Josef Frieser - Der Blinde
- Robert Trampitsch - Der zarte Knabe
- Jakob Holzer - Der plumpe Knabe
- Ferdinand Bischofter - Der gutmütige Knabe
- Elfriede Stromberger - Das Mädchen mit dem Amulett
- Heimo Wisser - Der Gezeichnete
