= Kassbach – Ein Porträt =

1979 film

- Directed by: Peter Patzak
- Written by: Peter Patzak; Helmut Zenker
- Produced by: Peter Patzak
- Starring: Walter Kohut
- Cinematography: Dietrich Lohmann
- Edited by: Trude Gruber
- Release date: February 1979
- Running time: 110 minutes
- Country: Austria
- Language: German

Kassbach – Ein Porträt is a 1979 Austrian drama film directed by Peter Patzak.

Walter Kohut plays the title role. Kohut embodies "the eponymous neo-Nazi 'hero,' a Viennese philistine and petit bourgeois par excellence borne of dull racism." The story is based on the novel "Kassbach oder das allgemeine Interesse am Meerschweinchen" (Kassbach or the General Interest in Guinea Pigs) by Helmut Zenker, who was also involved in the screenplay.

The film was entered into the 29th Berlin International Film Festival.

== Cast ==
- Walter Kohut - Karl Kassbach
- Immy Schell - Kassbach's wife
- Konrad Becker - Kassbach's son
- Walter Davy - Head of the Initiative
- Franz Buchrieser - Kassbach's friend
- Hanno Pöschl - Kassbach's friend
- Heinz Petters - Post office clerk
- Ulrich Baumgartner - Anwerber
- Erni Mangold - Liesi's mother
- Maria Engelstorfer - Kassbach's mother
- Heinrich Strobele - Kassbach's colleague
