= Schmutz (film) =

1987 film

- Directed by: Paulus Manker
- Written by: Paulus Manker; Michael Haneke; Franz Novotny
- Produced by: Kurt J. Mrkwicka
- Starring: Fritz Schediwy; Hans-Michael Rehberg; Siggi Schwientek; Josefin Platt; Hanno Pöschl
- Cinematography: Walter Kindler
- Edited by: Maria Homolkova
- Music by: Yello
- Distributed by: Manfred Salzgeber, Berlin
- Release date: May 1985
- Running time: 100 minutes
- Country: Austria
- Language: German

Schmutz is a 1985 Austrian drama film directed by Paulus Manker. It was entered into the 15th Moscow International Film Festival and was nominated for the Golden Prize. It won C.S.T. Award at Avoriaz Fantastic Film Festival (1986) and Best Director and Special Recommendation for the soundtrack at Ghent International Film Festival (1986).

Josef Schmutz is a custodian clerk guarding an abandoned industrial plant. The film is an allegory on the obsessive outsider and the banal roots of totalitarianism.

== Cast ==
- Fritz Schediwy as Joseph Schmutz
- Hans-Michael Rehberg as Oberkontrollor
- Siggi Schwientek as Fux
- Josefin Platt
- Mareile Geisler
- Axel Böhmert
- Günter Bothur
- Constanzia Hochle
- Hanno Pöschl
