= Houchang Allahyari =

Austrian psychiatrist and filmmaker (born 1941)

- هوشنگ الهیاری
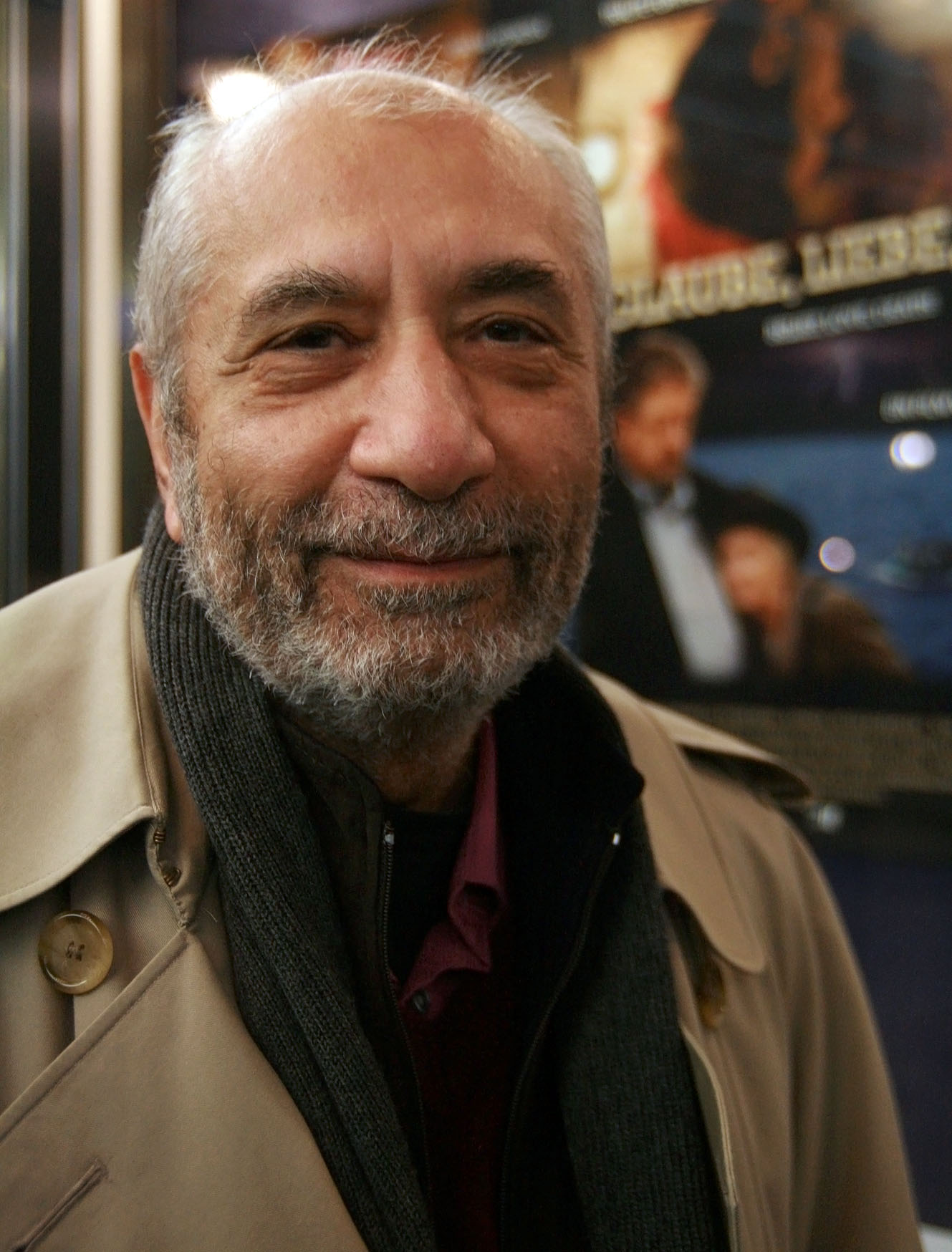
- Allahyari in 2012
- Born: 1941 (age 83–84); Tehran, Pahlavi Iran
- Occupation(s): psychiatrist and filmmaker
- Notable work: I Love Vienna

Houchang Allahyari (hoo-SHANG; Persian: هوشنگ الهیاری,; born 1941) is an Austrian psychiatrist and filmmaker of Iranian origin.

== Biography ==
Born in 1941, in Pahlavi Iran, Allahyari emigrated to Austria as a teenager. In Vienna, where he still lives today, he studied medicine and worked for a long time as a psychiatrist in prisons.

From 1970 onward, he made numerous short films, and later several feature films, of which I Love Vienna (1991), Höhenangst (1994), and Born in Absurdistan (1999) in particular found a wider audience. Allahyari repeatedly addresses the fates of migrants, refugees, and asylum seekers in his films, often dramatically, but with humor.

In October 2009, he presented the documentary film Bock for President, about the work of Ute Bock, a refugee aid worker, which he created together with his son Tom-Dariusch Allahyari. This earned them both the first-ever Austrian Film Award. In 2014, Allahyari received the Diagonale Film Award for Best Austrian Feature Film for The Last Dance.

Allahyari received another award in November 2023: the Decoration of Honour for Services to the Republic of Austria.

== Filmography ==
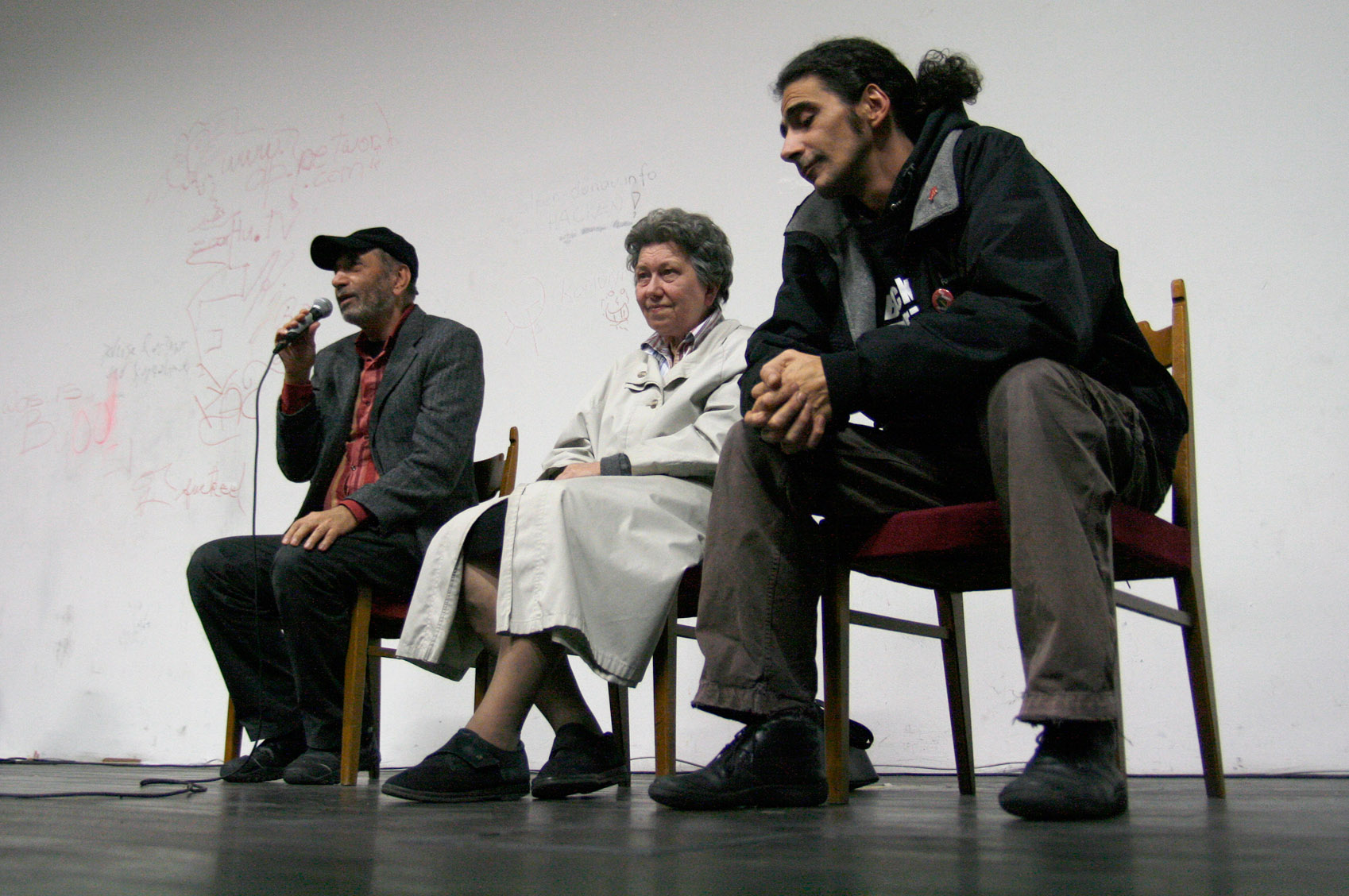
Houchang Allahyari (left) with Ute Bock and his son Tom-Dariusch Allahyari at the preview of Bock for President at the 2009 Vienna International Film Festival

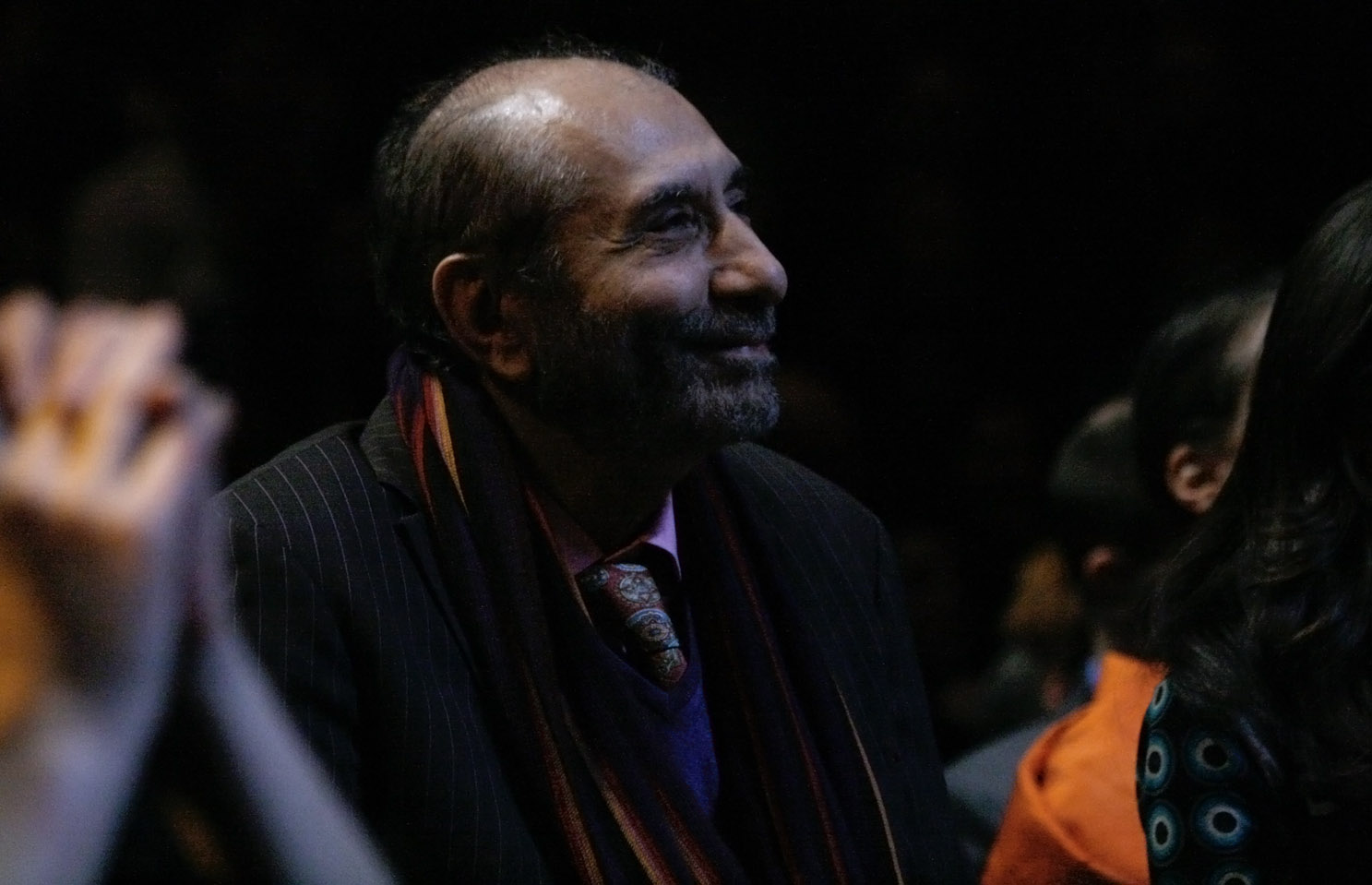
Houchang Allahyari at the Austrian Film Award in 2011

Allahyari's filmography includes:

- 1978: Truth (Wahrheit)
- 1981: I like to be in America
- 1982: Despite all this (Trotz alledem)
- 1983: The Life in Death (Das Leben im Tod)
- 1983: Harmony and understanding
- 1984: Thing 84
- 1985: Completion (Vollendung)
- 1985: Imago
- 1985: Pasolini stages his death (Pasolini inszeniert seinen Tod)
- 1988: Borderline
- 1990: Meat grinder (Fleischwolf)
- 1991: I Love Vienna
- 1992: The Day They Caught Jack Unterweger (Der Tag, an dem sie Jack Unterweger fingen)
- 1992: And tomorrow the Opera Ball (Und morgen der Operball)
- 1994: Fear of Heights (Höhenangst)
- 1995: Deadly Love (Tödliche Liebe)
- 1997: Black Flamingos
- 1999: Born in Absurdistan (Geboren in Absurdistan)
- 2002: Rocco
- 2007: Rumi – Poetry of Islam (Rumi – Poesie des Islam)
- 2009: Bock for President
- 2010: The Crazy World of Ute Bock (Die verrückte Welt der Ute Bock)
- 2012: The Persian Crocodile (Das persische Krokodil)
- 2013: Robert Tarantino
- 2014: The Last Dance (Der letzte Tanz)
- 2016: The Lovers of Balochistan (Die Liebenden von Balutschistan)
- 2018: Ute Bock Superstar
- 2024: And Freshly in Love Everyday (Und täglich frisch verliebt)
- 2025: Matarsak – The Scarecrow (Matarsak – Die Vogelscheuche)
