= Anima – Symphonie phantastique =

1981 film

Anima - Symphonie phantastique
- Directed by: Titus Leber
- Written by: Titus Leber
- Starring: Mathieu Carrière
- Cinematography: Mike Gast
- Edited by: Titus Leber
- Release date: 1981
- Running time: 85 minutes
- Country: Austria

Anima - Symphonie phantastique is a 1981 Austrian drama film directed by Titus Leber. It was shown out of competition at the 1981 Cannes Film Festival.

== Cast ==
- Mathieu Carrière - Bachelor
- Charo López - Anima
- Bruno Anthony - Anima (Male)
- Marquis DeFrigance - Duchamp
- August Schuschnigg - Childman
- Christian Renaud - Scientist
