= Das zweite Schraube-Fragment =

1986 Austrian film

- Directed by: Walter Andreas Christen
- Written by: Walter Andreas Christen
- Produced by: Walter Andreas Christen
- Starring: Mathias Forberg
- Cinematography: Hannes Eder
- Edited by: Hannes Eder
- Release date: May 1985
- Running time: 45 minutes
- Country: Austria
- Language: German

Das zweite Schraube-Fragment is a 1985 Austrian short adventure film directed by Walter Andreas Christen. It was screened in the Un Certain Regard section at the 1986 Cannes Film Festival.

== Cast ==
- Mathias Forberg - Günther Schraube
- Axel Klingenberg - Klingenberg
- Paola Loew - Putzfrau
- Jost Meyer - Pianist
- Justus Neumann - Prof. Neumann
- Ella Peneder - Sopranistin
- Jutta Schwarz - Jutta
- Bruno Thost - Dr. Grabl
- Freyja Wisböck - Hure
- Dieter Witting - Dieter
