= Angst (1983 film) =

1983 Austrian horror film

- Directed by: Gerald Kargl
- Written by: Gerald Kargl; Zbigniew Rybczyński
- Produced by: Gerald Kargl; Josef Reitinger-Laska
- Starring: Erwin Leder
- Cinematography: Zbigniew Rybczyński
- Edited by: Zbigniew Rybczyński
- Music by: Klaus Schulze
- Production company: Gerald Kargl
- Distributed by: Les Films Jacques Leitienne
- Release date: 1983
- Running time: 75 minutes (Director's cut); 83 minutes (Theatrical release)
- Country: Austria
- Language: German

Angst (English: "Fear") is a 1983 Austrian psychological horror thriller film directed by Gerald Kargl, who co-wrote the screenplay with cinematographer and editor Zbigniew Rybczyński. It follows a psychopath recently released from prison and is loosely based on real-life mass murderer Werner Kniesek. It was banned in many European countries on its release for its depictions of violence.

== Plot ==
An unnamed serial killer is eager to kill again following his release from prison, driven by a desire to see the fear in the eyes of his victims. He stops by a diner, where he is tempted to attack two girls sitting at the counter but is unable to act on this inclination in public. In a taxi afterwards, he prepares to kill the female driver but is forced to flee when the driver becomes suspicious and stops the car. The killer comes across a house during his escape and breaks in. Inside, he finds a mentally impaired man in a wheelchair who mistakes the killer for his own father. Soon, the man's mother and sister arrive at the house, and the killer hides before eventually attacking them, taping the daughter to a doorknob and strangling the mother. He ties up the mother before dragging the son to the upstairs bathroom and drowning him in the bathtub.

The killer then returns downstairs to find that the mother is dead or near death. The daughter pleads with the killer to give her mother her medication; the killer complies, wishing to prevent the mother from dying before what he had planned. His attempts to revive her are futile and he pushes the wheelchair she is in into a wall in a rage. The killer finds the daughter attempting to escape and chases her down. He stabs her to death, drinks her blood and vomits on her (the blood having acted as an emetic). During these episodes, the killer recounts the cruel treatment of his mother and stepfather to him during his childhood, together with his violent behaviour towards people and animals.

He wakes up on her body the following morning, partially undressed and covered in blood. He decides to leave in the family's car and take the bodies with him in the trunk, intending to show the bodies to his new victims to frighten them (he also brings the family's dog, alive, in the passenger seat). The killer rear-ends another car during his frantic escape, and there are several witnesses to the incident.

He returns to the diner, the same patrons from earlier there once again, and as he feeds the dog, he is apprehended by the police, who ask for his registration. He then willingly opens the trunk of the car, reveling in the fear the sight of the bodies causes in the onlookers. The film ends as a voice-over of a medical record declares that the killer was driven by a sadistic tendency caused by his unstable childhood.

== Cast ==
- Erwin Leder as K., The Psychopath
- Silvia Rabenreither as Daughter
  - Karin Springer as Daughter's voice
- Edith Rosset as Mother
  - Josefine Lakatha as Mother's voice
- Rudolf Götz as Son
- Robert Hunger-Bühler as Off-Text
- Renet Kastelik as Taxi Driver
- Hermann Groissenberger as Guest at the Café
- Claudia Schinko as Guest at the Café
- Rolf Bock as Police Officer

== Release ==
=== Home media ===
In 2012, Angst was released on Blu-ray in France under the title of Schizophrenia. In 2015, American distributor Cult Epics released the film on Blu-ray, DVD, and digitally, as well as giving the film a limited theatrical re-release in the United States.

== Reception ==
Dennis Schwartz from Ozus' World Movie Reviews gave the film a grade of A−, commending the film's cinematography, score, and Leder's performance. Schwartz concluded his review by stating that the film "artfully generates terror and revulsion, as we get into the foul deeds and dark visions of such a repulsive sicko." Nicholas Bell from IONCINEMA.com also commended the cinematography, stating that the camera is "either placed in close proximity to Leder as he runs, kills, and gnashes his teeth, or swooping like a bird of prey as it circles architectures and landscapes from dizzying heights and complex pans." Meagan Navarro from Bloody Disgusting praised the film, stating that the film "makes even Henry: Portrait of a Serial Killer look somewhat tame." Ryan Lambert from Please Unplug Me complimented the film's screenplay written from the perspective of Leder's psychopath, stating that the writing makes "the audience complicit in his crimes by placing us inside his mind, hearing a total lack of remorse or rehabilitation."

== Legacy ==
Film director Gaspar Noé has cited Angst as an influence on his filmmaking style. Angst was also an influence on the slasher film In a Violent Nature, written and directed by Chris Nash. Director of photography Zach Kuperstein stated that Barbarian's flashback sequence was visually inspired by Angst.

== See also ==
- Angst (soundtrack)
- List of cult films
- List of films featuring home invasions
- List of films featuring psychopaths and sociopaths
