= Franz Novotny =

Austrian film director

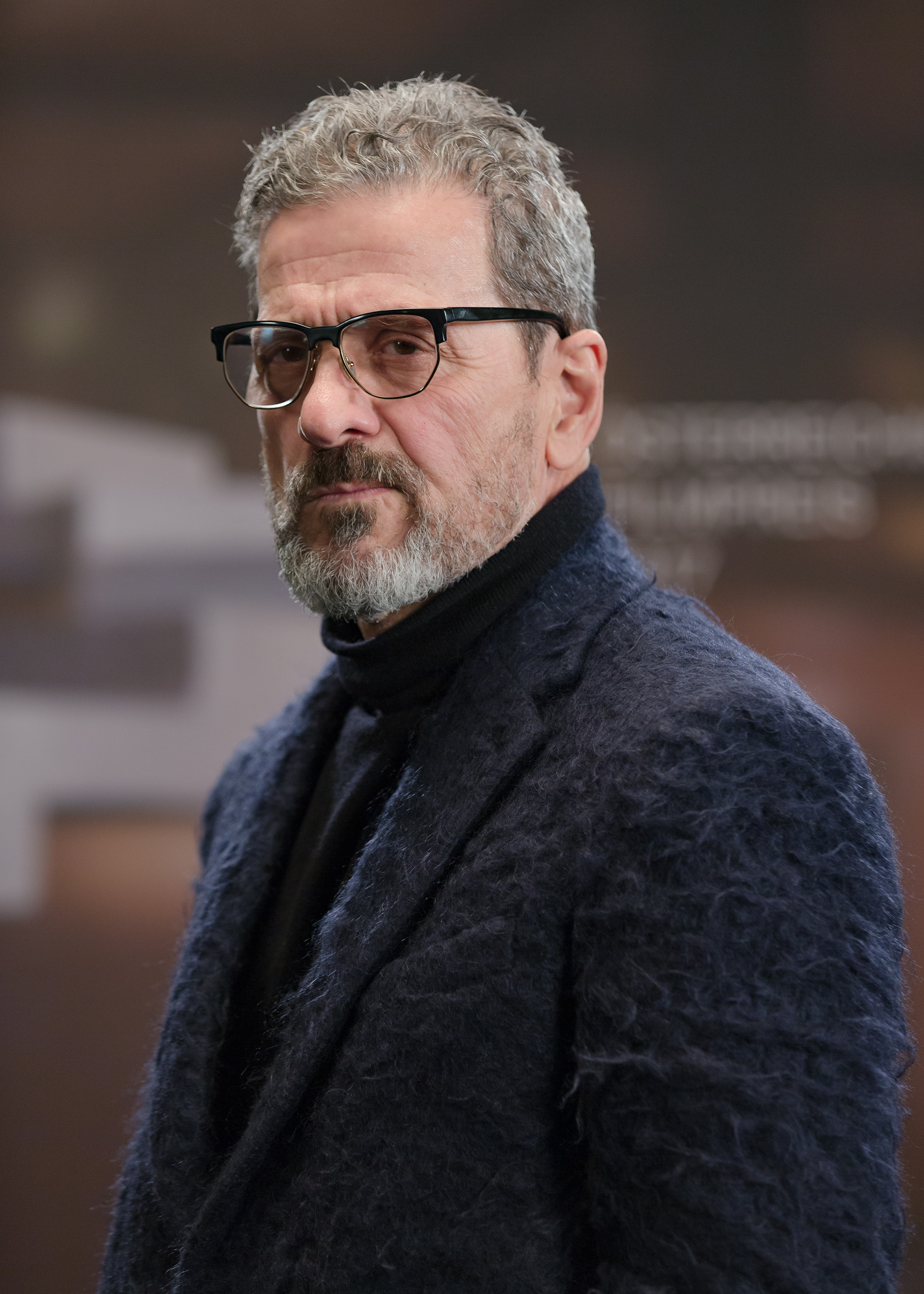
- Novotny in 2017
- Born: 30 May 1949 (age 77); Vienna, Austria
- Occupations: Film producer, film director, screenwriter
- Years active: 1968–present

Franz Novotny (born 30 May 1949) is an Austrian film producer, director and screenwriter who was born in Vienna. His 2003 film Yu was entered into the 25th Moscow International Film Festival.

Novotny and his wife Karin founded the production company Novotny & Novotny.

== Selected filmography ==
- Exit... nur keine Panik (director, screenplay, 1980)
- Coconuts (director, screenplay, 1985)
- Schmutz (screenplay, 1987)
- Yu (director, screenplay, 2003)
- Jew Suss: Rise and Fall (screenplay, producer, 2010)
- Therapy for a Vampire (producer, 2014)
- Egon Schiele: Death and the Maiden (producer, 2016) won 2017 Romy
- The Ground Beneath My Feet (producer, 2019)
- 7500 (co-producer, 2019)
- Caviar (co-producer, 2019)
