= Herbert Holba =

Austrian film director

- Born: 7 May 1932; Vienna, Austria
- Died: 26 October 1994 (aged 62); Vienna, Austria
- Occupations: Film director Screenwriter
- Years active: 1961–1972

Herbert Holba (7 May 1932 – 26 October 1994) was an Austrian film director and screenwriter. He directed five films between 1961 and 1971. His 1971 film The First Day was entered into the 21st Berlin International Film Festival.

== Selected filmography ==
- The First Day (1971)
