= Titus Leber =

Austrian writer (born 1951)

- Born: March 2, 1951 (age 75); Zell am See, Salzburg; Austria
- Occupations: Film director, screenwriter, multimedia artist
- Website: http://titusleber.com

Titus Leber (born 2 March 1951) is a writer and director of films based on classical music.

== Biography ==
Titus Leber is an Austrian screenwriter and director of music feature films and is considered to be one of the creative pioneers of the transitional phase from the analogue to the digital age. Since the mid-eighties he has specialized in the design and production of large scale interactive cultural projects in Europe, Asia and Africa.

After attending the Lycée Français de Vienne, Titus Leber pursued studies in theatre, mass-media-communication and history of art at the University of Vienna (PhD in 1976 with a dissertation on "The Multi-layering method”, an attempt to explore the potential of superimposed imagery for visual thinking beyond verbal communication”).

From the age of 14, T. Leber began making experimental films that increasingly used the above-mentioned "multi-layering method", culminating in his multiple award-winning films "Kindertotenlieder ( “Songs on the Death of Children” – 1976, Austria's nominee for best short film for the Academy Award, Cannes Film Festival ), and “Schubert–Fremd bin ich eingezogen” (“Schubert–A Stranger I came”, 1978 – Austrian National Award for filmmaking).

After a year at the American Film Institute in Hollywood, from where he graduated with a director's diploma in 1979, Leber returned to Austria to write and direct his first feature film, “Anima-Symphonie Fantastique" (1981) which was shown at the Official Selection at the 1981 Cannes Film Festival. (Hors compétition).

Endowed with an Erwin Schrödinger fellowship of the Austrian Academy of Sciences, T. Leber became from 1984 to 1985 a Research Fellow at the Center for Advanced Visual Studies (CAVS) at MIT's Center for Advanced Visual Studies. There he developed his "Image Reactor"®, an interactive Laser-Disc installation using complex permutative image-matrixes to simulate visual thinking. Early publications on artificial intelligence in the arts.

1985 Participation in the Biennale São Paulo with the installation "The Glassbead Game Installation”, show-casing an interactive game-like application consisting of a continuous flow of cross-related imagery.

Fascinated by the vision to interactively involve his audience in the exploration of the rich cultural heritage of his native Austria, he created between 1986 and 1990 the two landmark productions “Vienna Interactive” and “Mozart Interactive”. Created the company “Iconomics”.

Between 1991 and 1997 worked in Paris, where he made the HDTV 3D film "Les très Riches Heures du Louvre" in collaboration with UNESCO and the Louvre Museum, and developed the "Europe Interactive" project with IBM-Europe, which was then discontinued as part of the crisis that IBM went through in the mid-nineties. In 1995 Titus Leber designed the award-winning production "Le Monde de Pasteur" for the Pasteur Institute Paris and the production" 8 Historical Cities of Portugal for the Centro Nacional de Cultura, Lisboa. During that period he also served on the board of directors of the French film school La Fémis.

From 1997 to 2008 he worked in Bangkok / Thailand, where he created the large scale interactive DVD production "What Did the Buddha Teach? – The life and teaching of Lord Buddha“ for the Mae Fah Luang Foundation, developed the opera feature film project "Parsifal – A Buddhist Tale” and served on the board of directors of the Bangkok Opera.

During this time he held in parallel a tenure as Professor at the Academy of Media Arts in Cologne (1997 to 1999) where he began experimentally superimposing entire feature films as part of the lecture series "The Dissociation Experiment".

In 2011, T. Leber got elected as a member of the European Cultural Parliament (ECP), whose representative to the African Union he has been since 2021.

From 2009 to 2014 in Indonesia, where he was commissioned by the Indonesian government to direct and produce the multimedia project "Borobudur – Paths to Enlightenment", a comprehensive interactive exploration of one of the largest Buddhist Temples in the world. Publication of several relevant works.

In 2015 T. Leber founded the initiative "Africa Interactive" with the aim of bringing Africa's cultural heritage into cyberspace. Since then, numerous stays in West Africa as part of the related activities.

As of 2017 back in Vienna. Awarded with the professional title of "Professor" by the Federal President of the Republic of Austria.

2018 Appointment as member of the European Academy of Sciences, Arts and Letters (AESAL).

2019–2022 Documentation of African cultural heritage in Austrian private collections in 3D. Foundation of the association "Mnemonics Digital – Interdisciplinary Study Society for Digital Humanism and World Cultural Heritage”.

== Filmography ==
- KINDERTOTENLIEDER (1976, 16mm, Color, 28 Min)

Producer, Script, Director, Editing, 2nd unit Camera. Multiple- award-winning classical music-film, awarded among others with the “Espigia de Oro-Valladolid, Grand Prix Musique et Image-Paris, and the special award “Colombe d ́Art-Cannes. Austria´s Official Nominee for the Academy Awards in the category Short films.

- SCHUBERT–A Stranger I Came (1978 16mm, Color, 65 Min)

Producer, Script, Director, Editing, 2nd unit Camera. Cannes Film Festival: Selected by the “Semaine de la Critique” (Critic's Week Section)

- Anima - Symphonie phantastique (1981, 35mm, Color, 85 Min).

Script, Director, Editing. With Mathieu Carrière and Charo Lopez Official Selection of the Cannes Film Festival 1981 (Hors Concours)

== TV productions ==
- SYMPHONY FROM THE NEW WORLD (Based on A. Dvorák's 9th Symphony, in collaboration with NASA), produced by ORF, 1985.
- NUCLEAR REQUIEM: 1985 produced by ORF

== Interactive Multimedia Productions ==
- THE IMAGE REACTOR Created at the Center for Advanced Visual Studies at MIT 1985
- VIENNA INTERACTIVE (1986). Distributed by Voyager in the US and Pioneer in Japan
- MOZART INTERACTIVE (1991 und 2006)
- THE GREAT LOUVRE (1993) (in HDTV, 3D- non-interactive)
- THE WORLD of PASTEUR (1995)
- Award for the best scientific CD-ROM of the Year by the International Association for Media in Science (IAMS)
- 8 HISTORICAL CITIES of PORTUGAL (1998)
- WHAT DID THE BUDDHA TEACH? (2000, Commissioned by the Mae Fah Luang Foundation under Royal Patronage, Thailand)
- BOROBUDUR – PATHS to ENLIGHTENMENT (2013, commissioned by the Government of Indonesia)

== Publications ==
Selected Publications by Titus Leber:

-“The multilayer method or the “ Savage Image” in Artibus et Historiae, rivista internazionale di arti visive e cinema, Vol.1, No.1 (1980) pp 145–152, Libreria Commissionaria Sansoni ( LICOSA). Firenze

- “Visuelle Energetik / Visual Energetics” in “Artificial Intelligence in the Arts-Nr 1 “Brainworks”. pp 82–88, Steirischer Herbst, Graz, Herausgeber Richard Kriesche, 1985

- “Interactively Setting in Motion the Wheel of Law – Telling the Life and Philosophy of the Buddha: the Mural Paintings in the Temple of the Emerald Buddha in Bangkok” in “ Interactive Dramaturgies”- New Approaches in Multimedia Content and Design . pp 43–55. Herausg. Heide Hagebölling. Springer Verlag Berlin- Heidelberg, 2004

- “Von Monsalvat nach Angkor Wat- Parsifal- eine Buddhistische Legende” in “Wagner Weltweit”, Zeitschrift des Richard Wagner Verbandes e.V, Nr.41, März 2004 ISSN 1618-3886, pp 45–51

- Lalitavistara – The Buddha's Life as told on the Borobudur by Titus Leber. Published by PT. Taman Wisata Candi Borobudur, Prambanan and Ratu Boko ( Persero), Jakarta, 376 Seiten, 2011, ISBN 978-979-91-0331-4

- “Decoding Borobudur for Cyberspace” Written and conceived by Titus Leber, 139 pages. 2013. Published by PT. Taman Wisata Candi Borobudur, Prambanan and Ratu Boko ( Persero), Jakarta ISBN 978-602-98279-2-7

Selected Publications on Titus Leber:

- “Schichtungsmethode und Tiefenpsychologie” by Prof. Erwin Ringel in Artibus et Historiae, rivista internazionale di arti visive e cinema, Vol.1, No.1 (1980) pp 159–151, Libreria Commissionaria Sansoni ( LICOSA).Firenze.

- “Notizen zu den Über-Legungen in den Filmen von Titus Lebers “ Kindertotenliedern” (1975) und “Fremd bin ich eingezogen” (1978) by Dieter Wittich in Artibus et Historiae, rivista internazionale di arti visive e cinema, Vol.1, No.1 (1980) pp 153–158, Libreria Commissionaria Sansoni ( LICOSA).Firenze.

- “Un virtuose du surimpressionisme- Titus Leber” par Henriette Dujarric- in “ Le Technicien du Film”, 1979. p. 1

- “Anima ( Austrian – Color) Variety, 3. Juni 1981

- “Anima – Symphonie Fantastique - Ein Film von Titus Leber” von Ilse Mirnig. In: Harlekin 1982, dritter Jahrgang. Das Harlekin Magazin. Postfach 605166, 2000 Hamburg 60

- “Die schöne Kinowelt des Doktor Leber”- Der “Anima”-Regisseur brachte Österreich zum Festival nach Cannes”. Von Ditta Rudle in: Die Presse 23/24 Mai 1983

- “Die Zeitmaschine”– Interview in Skytec-Magazin 04/89

- “Touch me Amadeus” in: Skytech Mai 1991

- “Auf dem Weg zur multimedialen Enzyklopädie- Edutainment auf Bildplatte – Die Zukunft der Bildung?” von Walter Weiss in “Neue Zürcher Zeitung” 3.12.1993

- “The World of Interactive “Edutainment” in “ International Herald Tribune”, March 8, 1993

- “History for the Interactive Generation – Filmmaker Titus Lebers $ 12 Million Eurodisc Project, backed in part by IBM, will transform History for the Video Generation” in: International Business Week, May 24, 1993

- “Virtual Buddha – A new CD Rom Triptych explores the life and meaning of the Lord Buddha” by Wanphen Sreshtaputra .In: Bangkok Post, Section Outlook”, 2.Dezember 2000

- “Cornelia Szabó-Knotik: Titus Leber. In: Oesterreichisches Musiklexikon. Online-Ausgabe, Wien 2002 ff., ISBN 3-7001-3077-5; Druckausgabe: Band 3, Verlag der Österreichischen Akademie der Wissenschaften, Wien 2004, ISBN 3-7001-3045-7.

- “When Technology serves Spirituality – Multimedia film-maker Titus Leber shares his passion for spreading Buddha´s message through technology” by Vasana Chinvarakorn. In: Bangkok Post, Section Outlook, 28.Dezember 2010

- “Entdeckungsreisen mit Diderot 2.0” von Walter Weiss. In: Wiener Zeitung, Extra, 27–28.2.2021
