= Gerald Kargl =

Austrian film director

Gerald Kargl (born 1953, Villach) is an Austrian film director most famous for directing the 1983 film Angst.

== Biography ==
Being fascinated by moving pictures, he began shooting short films at the age of 14. Between 1976 and 1982 he founded and organized the Austrian film festival Die Österreichischen Filmtage. At the same time he was founder and editor of the Austrian film magazine Filmschrift.

In 1981 he formed the LLC Gerald Kargl Ges.m.b.H. Filmproduktion. In 1982/83 he wrote, directed and produced the feature film Angst in cooperation with the Polish filmmaker Zbigniew Rybczyński, who won an Oscar for his short film Tango in 1983. Angst has been distributed in more than 20 countries.

Between 1984 and 1994 Gerald Kargl worked on more than 100 commercials and promotional films as author, director and producer, receiving more than 30 national and international awards, Cannes and Clio Awards among others. 1996 he founded and produced the Hotel-TV CITY LIGHTS and sold the project in 2002.

Since 1994 to date he wrote, directed and produced more than 20 documentaries and educational films.

== Filmography ==
- 1977: Ratatata
- 1980: Skiszenen mit Franz Klammer
- 1981: Das vertraute Objekt
- 1983: Angst
