= Peter Patzak =

Austrian film director (1945–2021)

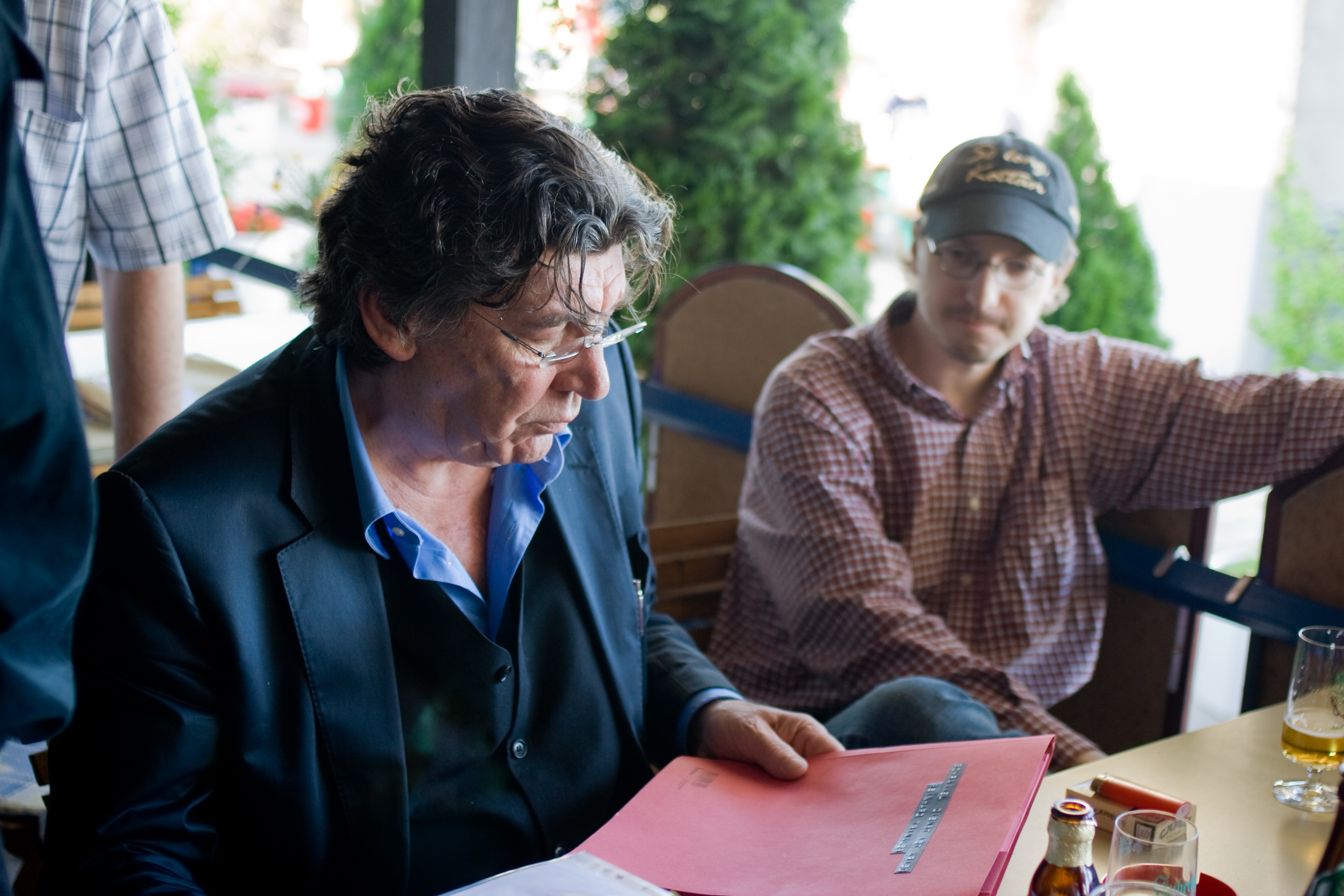
- Peter Patzak and Jan Zenker (2009)
- Born: 2 January 1945; Vienna, Nazi Germany
- Died: 11 March 2021 (aged 76); Krems an der Donau, Lower Austria, Austria
- Occupations: Film director Screenwriter
- Years active: 1973–2021

Peter Patzak (2 January 1945 – 11 March 2021) was an Austrian film director and screenwriter. He directed 60 films from 1973 to 2021. His film Kassbach – Ein Porträt was entered into the 29th Berlin International Film Festival, and his film Wahnfried was screened out of competition at the 1987 Cannes Film Festival. His 1997 film Shanghai 1937 was entered into the 20th Moscow International Film Festival.

== Selected filmography ==
- Situation (1974)
- Parapsycho – Spectrum of Fear (1975)
- Kottan ermittelt (1976–1983, TV series)
- Bait (1976)
- The Unicorn (1978, based on a novel by Martin Walser)
- Santa Lucia (1979, TV film)
- Kassbach – Ein Porträt (1979)
- Geld oder Leben (1981, TV film)
- The Uppercrust (1981)
- Tramps (1983)
- Tiger: Springtime in Vienna (1984)
- Die Försterbuben (1984, TV film, based on a novel by Peter Rosegger)
- Wahnfried (1986, film about Richard Wagner)
- Lethal Obsession (1987)
- Sentimental Journey (1987, TV film)
- Camillo Castiglioni oder die Moral der Haifische (1988, TV film about Camillo Castiglioni)
- Midnight Cop (1988)
- Frau Berta Garlan (1989, TV film, based on a novel by Arthur Schnitzler)
- Death of a Schoolboy (1990, film about Gavrilo Princip, based on a novel by Hans Koning)
- Lex Minister (1990)
- Saint Peter's Snow (1991, TV film, based on a novel by Leo Perutz)
- Rochade (1992, TV film, based on a novel by Ladislav Mňačko)
- Im Kreis der Iris (1992, TV film, based on a story by Franz Nabl)
- Das Babylon Komplott (1993, TV film)
- 1945 (1994, TV film)
- Deadly Obsession (1994, TV film)
- Jenseits der Brandung (1995, TV film)
- Brennendes Herz (1996, based on The Owl of Minerva by Gustav Regler)
- Shanghai 1937 (1997, TV film, based on a novel by Vicki Baum)
- Butterfly Feelings (1997, TV film)
- Murderous Legacy (1998, TV film)
- Sweet Little Sixteen (1999, TV film)
- Die Entführung (1999, TV film)
- Captive in Yemen (1999, TV film)
- Der Mörder in dir (2000, TV film)
- Denk ich an Deutschland … – Adeus und Goodbye (2001, TV documentary series episode)
- Die achte Todsünde: Toskana-Karussell (2002, TV film)
- Die Wasserfälle von Slunj (2002, TV film, based on a novel by Heimito von Doderer)
- The Uncrowned Heart (2003, TV film)
- Verliebte Diebe (2003, TV film)
- Sternzeichen (2003)
- Rufer, der Wolf (2005, TV film)
- Kottan ermittelt: Rien ne va plus (2010)
