= 1986 in Dutch television =

List of years in Dutch television
- … 1976; 1977; 1978; 1979; 1980; 1981; 1982; 1983; 1984; 1985; 1986; 1987; 1988; 1989; 1990; 1991; 1992; 1993; 1994; 1995; 1996 …
- Art; Archaeology; Architecture; Literature; Music; Philosophy; Science; +...

This is a list of Dutch television related events from 1986.

== Events ==
- 1 April – Frizzle Sizzle are selected to represent the Netherlands at the Eurovision Song Contest 1986 with their song "Alles heeft een ritme". They were selected to be the Dutch entry at the Nationaal Songfestival held at Theater De Flint in Amersfoort.
- 3 May – Belgium wins the Eurovision Song Contest with the song "J'aime la vie" by Sandra Kim. The Netherlands finish in tenth place with their song "Alles heeft een ritme" by Frizzle Sizzle.
- Unknown – Gina De Wit, performing as Linda Ronstadt wins the second series of Soundmixshow.

== Births ==
- 15 March – Stacey Rookhuizen, TV personality
- 30 June – Jamai Loman, singer & TV presenter
- 12 July – Marieke Elsinga, radio host and television presenter
- 23 December – Anna-Alicia Sklias, TV presenter & dancer

== Deaths ==
- 5 August – Willem Ruis, 41, game show presenter, cardiac arrest.
