= 1986 in television =

1986 in television may refer to:

- 1986 in American television for television-related events in the United States.
- 1986 in Australian television for television-related events in Australia.
- 1986 in Belgian television for television-related events in Belgium.
- 1986 in Brazilian television for television-related events in Brazil.
- 1986 in British television for television-related events in the United Kingdom.
  - 1986 in Scottish television for television-related events in Scotland.
- 1986 in Canadian television for television-related events in Canada.
- 1986 in Danish television for television-related events in Denmark.
- 1986 in Dutch television for television-related events in the Netherlands.
- 1986 in Estonian television for television-related events in the Estonian SSR.
- 1986 in French television for television-related events in the France.
- 1986 in German television for television-related events in Germany.
- 1986 in Irish television for television-related events in the Republic of Ireland.
- 1986 in Italian television for television-related events in Italy.
- 1986 in Japanese television for television-related events in Japan.
- 1986 in Norwegian television for television-related events in Norway.
- 1986 in Philippine television for television-related events in the Philippines.
- 1986 in Spanish television for television-related events in Spain.
