= Götz Kauffmann =

Austrian actor, cabaret artist and writer

- Born: Gottfried Maria Kauffman; 15 January 1949; Vienna, Austria
- Died: 26 January 2010; Vienna
- Occupation(s): actor: stage, movie & TV
- Spouse: 3
- Children: 1. Clemens; 2. Judith; 3.
- Parent: Johann M. Kauffmann (1910-1965)

Götz Kauffmann (15 January 1949 – 26 January 2010) was an Austrian stage, film and television actor, cabaret artist and writer.

== Life ==
Gottfried Maria Kauffman was born in the fifteenth district of Vienna. His father was the noted Vienna organ builder, Johann M. Kauffmann (1910-1965). The Kauffmanns had indeed been active in Vienna as organ builders since 1877: between 1964 and 1968 Götz Kauffmann also studied as an apprentice to master the craft. He then decided to pursue a career not as an organ builder but as an actor and cabaret artist. Kauffmann undertook his drama training at Vienna's Max Reinhardt Seminar where he completed the four-year course in 1972. Early theatre engagements took him to the Salzburger Landestheater and then, in 1977, to the Raimund Theater and the Theater in der Josefstadt in Vienna.

He reached a wider audience through appearances in several long running television series such as "Ein echter Wiener geht nicht unter" (loosely "You can't knock a true Viennese down", 1975-1979) in which he featured as the concierge, "Kurt Blahovec". There were also "Mozart und Meisel" (1987), in which he played the leading part and "Kaisermühlen Blues" (1992-1999) in which he also took one of the lead roles. He was also becoming known in film roles, featuring in numerous national and international cinema productions. He played the part of Oskar in "Tales from the Vienna Woods" directed by Maximilian Schell and was a member of the cast of "Verlassen Sie bitte Ihren Mann!" ("Please leave your husband", 1993) directed by Reinhard Schwabenitzky, and starring Reinhard Schwabenitzky's wife, Elfi Eschke, Wolfgang Böck and Helmut Griem. More recently, in 2008, he appeared in "Echte Wiener – Die Sackbauer-Saga" (2008), a successful cinema reprise of the 1970s television series.

Alongside his film career Kauffman continued to sustain his career as a theatre performer, and also pursued his interest in cabaret. In 1980 he founded the "Arge Kabarett" and in 1983 he presented his first solo programme, "Götz-Zitate". During his final years he worked as a freelance performer in Vienna, also reprising various lead roles in the Gloria-Theater.

Götz Kauffmann was honoured with the Goldener Rathausmann award by the city of Vienna. He was also a notable freemason.

His strikingly confessional autobiography, "Meine Abrechnung. Zwischen Kaisermühlen-Blues und Suff", appeared in 1999. It disclosed a sometimes difficult life, featuring three broken marriages, depression and alcohol issues. For many years he was also badly affected by diabetes. A few days before he died Kauffmann was able to celebrate his sixty-first birthday, surrounded by colleagues, his three children and his brother. His body is buried in the family grave at the Baumgartner Cemetery (Group K1, Nr. 75) in Vienna.

=== Theatre roles (selection) ===
- 1970–1972: Die Zwillinge von Venedig, Bauernhof-Theater in Meggenhofen (OÖ)
- 1970–1972: Das Kaffeehaus von Carlo Goldoni, Bauernhof-Theater in Meggenhofen (OÖ)
- 1970–1972: Urfaust, Bauernhof-Theater in Meggenhofen (OÖ)
- 1972: Wie es Euch gefällt (Probstein), Landestheater Salzburg
- 1972: Wiener Blut (Kagler), Landestheater Salzburg
- 1972: Lumpazivagabundus (Knieriem), Landestheater Salzburg
- 1978: Tscharlie der Kegel: Der uneheliche Sohn des Herrn Karl, one person piece by Herwig Seeböck, written for Götz Kauffmann
- 1978: Der tolle Tag oder die Hochzeit des Figaro, Salzburger Festspiele
- 1979: Die Heirat, Volkstheater Wien
- 1980: Die letzten Tag der Menschheit, Wiener Festwochen
- 1981–1982: Professuren, Theater der Courage
- 1981–1982: Mir san net aso, Theater in der Drachengasse
- 1981–1982: Der Talisman, Theater in der Josefstadt
- 1981–1982: Liliom, Theater in der Josefstadt
- 1985–1986: Turnhalle, Theater in der Drachengasse
- 1989: Das vierte Gebot, Sommerfestspiele Berndorf/Stadttheater
- 1990: Haben Sie nichts zu verzollen, Theater in der Josefstadt
- 1991: Orpheus in der Unterwelt, Wiener Kammeroper
- 2005: Wiener Blut, Musik Theater Schönbrunn
- 2007: Die Fledermaus, Musik Theater Schönbrunn

=== Film roles (selection) ===
- 1971: Tatort - Mordverdacht, at that times till identified as Gottfried Kauffmann
- 1975–1979: Ein echter Wiener geht nicht unter
- 1976: Die Alpensaga, Teil 1 – Liebe im Dorf
- 1977: Tatort – Der vergessene Mord
- 1977: Die Alpensaga, Teil 3 – Das große Fest
- 1978: Aus dem Leben eines Dicken
- 1978: Singles
- 1979: Tales from the Vienna Woods
- 1980: Car-napping
- 1981: Kottan ermittelt – Die Beförderung
- 1984: Non-Stop Trouble with My Double
- 1987: Mozart und Meisel
- 1992–1999: Kaisermühlen Blues
- 1993: Verlassen Sie bitte Ihren Mann!
- 1993: Die Rebellion
- 1995: Schwarze Tage
- 1995: Tödliche Liebe
- 1995: El Chicko – der Verdacht
- 1996: Der See
- 1996: Hochwürdens Ärger mit dem Paradies
- 1999: Fink fährt ab
- 2001–2002: Dolce Vita & Co
- 2001: Ene mene muh – und tot bist du
- 2008: Echte Wiener – Die Sackbauer-Saga

=== Cabaret (selection) ===
- 1977: Stichwort über …
- 1983: Götz-Zitate (first solo programme)
- 1987: Aber der Kopf is’ no oben
- 1988: Geschafft
- 1988: Duell/Duett
- 1988: Alles Theater
- 1991: Mir stinkt’s
- 1999: Tick Tak Talk
- 1999: Warten auf die Talkshow

=== Books ===
- Meine Abrechnung. Zwischen Kaisermühlen-Blues und Suff. Ueberreuter, Wien 1999. ISBN 3800037351
- Küss die Hand? Mein Wiener Wörterbuch. Verlag 66, Amstetten 2003. ISBN 3902211067
