= Gerhard Klingenberg =

Austrian director, artistic director and actor (1929–2024)

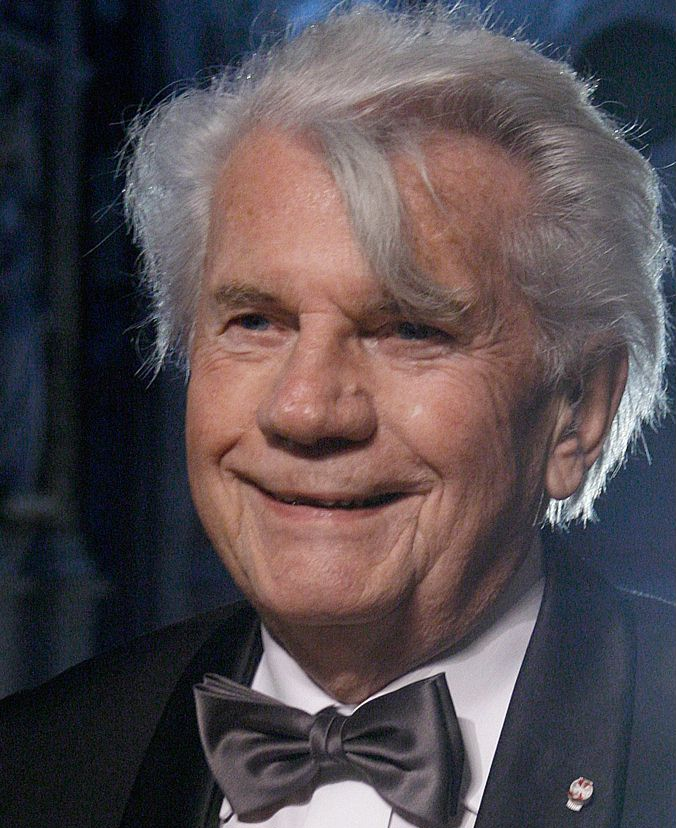
- Klingenberg in 2010
- Born: Gerhard Schwabenitzky; 11 May 1929; Vienna, Austria
- Died: 18 June 2024 (aged 95); Villach, Carinthia, Austria
- Occupations: Television director; stage director; theatre manager; actor
- Years active: 1958–1990
- Organizations: Stadttheater Klagenfurt; Berliner Ensemble; Burgtheater; Schauspielhaus Zürich
- Notable work: Was wäre, wenn...?

Gerhard Klingenberg (born Gerhard Schwabenitzky; 11 May 1929 – 18 June 2024) was an Austrian actor and stage director, and theatre manager. He was also involved in television productions as an actor, director, and scriptwriter. He was Intendant of the Burgtheater in Vienna from 1971 to 1976, and then of the Schauspielhaus Zürich from 1977 to 1982.

He had a successful early career in Austria, stepping in at the Burgtheater at age 18 to play Camille in Büchner's Dantons Tod and both acting and directing at Stadttheater Klagenfurt, Stadttheater St. Pölten and the Tyrolean State Theatre in Innsbruck. In 1958 he followed an invitation by Bertold Brecht to his Berliner Ensemble in East Germany, and worked also for Deutscher Fernsehfunk directing television plays. When the Berlin Wall was built in 1961, he moved to West Germany where he directed at major theatres. His first direction at the Burgtheater was in 1968, and he became theatre manager in 1971. He brought avant-garde European directors to Vienna, including Giorgio Strehler, Peter Hall, Luca Ronconi, Jean-Louis Barrault, Peter Wood and Otomar Krejča, and introduced plays by authors such as Thomas Bernhard, Harold Pinter and Tom Stoppard. In his directions there, such as Hebbel's Judith, he used political analogies to a divided Europe.

== Life and career ==
Gerhard Schwabenitzky was born in Vienna on 11 May 1929. His father came from a worker's family of Polish origin and worked for Fiat, his mother was born in Bohemia.

He took private classes in acting in Salzburg after World War II and was accepted to study at the Max Reinhardt Seminar; he studied acting and directing also in the drama class of the Vienna Conservatory. He made money as an actor with the Landesbühne Burgenland; this occupation was prohibited for students, and he therefore took the stage name Klingenberg, which he kept for life. At age 18 he stepped in to play Camille in Büchner's Dantons Tod at the Burgtheater in Vienna. He received an offer from the Stadttheater Klagenfurt already while studying, and directed there in March 1948 Das Haus in Montevideo by Curt Goetz. He then had engagements at the newly opened Stadttheater St. Pölten and later at the Tyrolean State Theatre in Innsbruck, where he played roles such as Franz Moor in Schiller's Die Räuber.

In 1956 Klingenberg was invited by Bertold Brecht for his Berliner Ensemble in East Germany, to work on the world premiere of his Die Tage der Commune. Helene Weigel hired him as stage director after Brecht's death. As he was getting little work there, he also worked for Deutscher Fernsehfunk (DFF), where he directed television plays and theatrical recordings. In 1959, he directed the crime comedy Spuk in Villa Sonnenschein in the first co-production by DEFA and DFF. Soon afterwards, Klingenberg filmed the stage play Was wäre, wenn...? by Hedda Zinner. After the Berlin Wall was built in 1961, Klingenberg feared for his freedom of movement and chose to return to Austria.

From 1962 to 1968, Klingenberg directed at the Städtische Bühnen Köln, the Schauspiel Frankfurt, and the Schauspielhaus Hamburg, as well as at the Schillertheater in Berlin, the Düsseldorfer Schauspielhaus, the Schauspielhaus Zürich and the Münchner Kammerspiele. His first stage direction at the Burgtheater was in 1968, and he became theatre manager in 1971, holding the position until 1976. He brought avant-garde European directors to Vienna, including Giorgio Strehler, Peter Hall, Luca Ronconi, Jean-Louis Barrault, Peter Wood, Roberto Guicciardini, Otomar Krejča and Claus Peymann. He introduced plays by authors such as Thomas Bernhard whose Die Jagdgesellschaft caused controversies in 1974, Harold Pinter and Tom Stoppard to the house repertoire. He directed there Hebbel's Judith with Rolf Boysen as Holofernes in 1973, Grillparzer's König Ottokars Glück und Ende in 1976 with Heinz Reincke in the title role, often with political analogies to a divided Europe.

Klingenberg returned to the Schauspielhaus Zürich where he was theatre manager from 1977 to 1982, where he directed Schillers Wilhelm Tell and Dürrenmatt's Romulus der Große. He was Intendant at Berlin's Renaissance-Theater. Thereafter, he worked as a freelance director.

Alongside his theatre work, Klingenberg participated in television productions as an actor, director and scriptwriter. He authored books such as Das gefesselte Burgtheater (2003) and Aus vergangenen Burgtheater Tagen (2009) as well as an autobiography, Kein Blatt vor dem Mund (1998).

=== Personal life ===
Klingenberg was the father of director Reinhard Schwabenitzky, who was married to the German-Austrian actress Elfi Eschke.

Klingenberg died in Villach on 18 June 2024, at the age of 95.

== Films ==
Klingenberg's films include:

=== East Germany ===
- 1959: Spuk in Villa Sonnenschein (TV film)
- 1960: Was wäre, wenn...?
- 1961: Guten Tag, lieber Tag (also screenwriter)
- 1961: Die heilige Johanna von Amerika (TV film)

=== West Germany ===
- 1963: Der Mann aus England (TV film)
- 1963: Unterm Birnbaum (based on the eponymous novella, TV film)
- 1967: Das schwedische Zündholz (based on a short stoy by Anton Chekhov, TV film) (also screenwriter)
- 1967: Kabale und Liebe (based on Intrigue and Love, TV film)
- 1968: Der Tod des Handlungsreisenden (based on Death of a Salesman, TV film)
- 1968: Tragödie auf der Jagd (based on The Shooting Party, TV film)
- 1969: Der Talisman (based on a play by Johann Nestroy, TV film)
- 1969: Das Interview (TV film)
- 1970: Ardèle oder Das Gänseblümchen (based on Ardèle ou la Marguerite, TV film)
- 1970: Friede den Hütten! Krieg den Palästen! (film about Georg Büchner and The Hessian Courier, TV film)
- 1976: Kabale und Liebe (based on Intrigue and Love, TV film)
- 1977: Morgen (based on the short story To-morrow by Joseph Conrad, Swiss TV film)

== Awards ==
- 1964: Television Film Prize of the German Academy of Performing Arts for In the Matter of J. Robert Oppenheimer
- 2000, 2009 (in gold): Decoration of Honour for Services to the Republic of Austria
- 2002: Jakob Prandtauer Prize for Science and Art
- Austrian Decoration for Science and Art
