= 1986 in German television =

This is a list of German television related events from 1986.

== Events ==
- 27 March - Ingrid Peters is selected to represent Germany at the 1986 Eurovision Song Contest with her song "Über die Brücke geh'n". She is selected to be the thirty-first German Eurovision entry during Ein Lied für Bergen held at the German Theatre in Munich.

== Debuts ==
=== ARD ===
- 6 January – Engels & Consorten (1986)
- 8 January –
  - Der Leihopa (1986–1988)
  - Lauter Glückspilze (1986)
- 13 February – Schloßherren (1986)
- 17 February – Liebling Kreuzberg (1986–1998)
- 21 February – Tante Tilly (1986)
- 22 April – Detektivbüro Roth (1986–1987)
- 2 June – Die Montagsfamilie (1986–1987)
- 5 June – Ein heikler Fall (1986–1988)
- 22 September – Kir Royal (1986)
- 26 September – Kanal fatal (1986–2011)
- 29 September – Losberg (1986–1988)
- 5 October – The Lenz Papers (1986)
- 9 October – Irgendwie und sowieso (1986)
- 13 October – Ein Stück aus ihrem Leben (1986–1987)
- 12 November – Väter und Söhne – Eine deutsche Tragödie (1986)
- 6 December – (United States) Miami Vice (1984– 1989)
- 8 December – Roncalli (1986–1987)
- 16 December – Großstadtrevier (1986–Present)
- 29 December – Anton, wohin? (1986–1988)

=== ZDF ===
- 18 March – Alles was Recht ist (1986)
- 27 March – Wanderjahre (1986)
- 3 September –
  - Rette mich, wer kann (1986)
  - Urlaub auf italienisch (1986)
- 25 September –
  - S.Y. Arche Noah (1986)
  - Hessische Geschichten (1986–1994)
- 21 October – Die Wicherts von nebenan (1986–1991)
- 31 October – Mit meinen heißen Tränen (1986)

=== DFF ===
- 20 February – Alfons Zitterbacke (1986)
- 23 February – Treffpunkt Flughafen (1986)
- 25 February – Neumanns Geschichten (1986)
- 3 October – Rund um die Uhr (1986)

=== 3sat ===
- 29 March – Unternehmen Köpenick (1986)

=== Armed Forces Network ===
- (United States) ALF (1986–1990)

=== BFBS ===
- 3 April - (United Kingdom) Running Scared (1986)
- 28 May - (United Kingdom) The December Rose (1986)
- (United Kingdom) The Giddy Game Show (1985-1987)
- (United Kingdom) The Really Wild Show (1986-2006)
- (United Kingdom) Farrington of the F.O. (1986-1987)
- (United Kingdom) Wizbit (1986-1988)
- (United Kingdom) Pinny's House (1986)

== Television shows ==
=== 1950s ===
- Tagesschau (1952–present)

=== 1960s ===
- heute (1963-present)

=== 1970s ===
- heute-journal (1978-present)
- Tagesthemen (1978-present)

=== 1980s ===
- Wetten, dass..? (1981-2014)
- Sketchup (1984-1986)
- Lindenstraße (1985–present)

== Networks and services ==
=== Launches ===
| Network | Type | Launch date | Notes | Source |
|---|---|---|---|---|
| ARD 1 Plus | Cable television | 29 March | | |

=== Closures ===
| Network | Type | End date | Notes | Sources |
|---|---|---|---|---|
| Europa TV | Cable television | 29 November | | |

== Births ==
- 3 March - Sandra Rieß, TV & radio host
