= Bibiana Zeller =

Austrian actress (1928–2023)

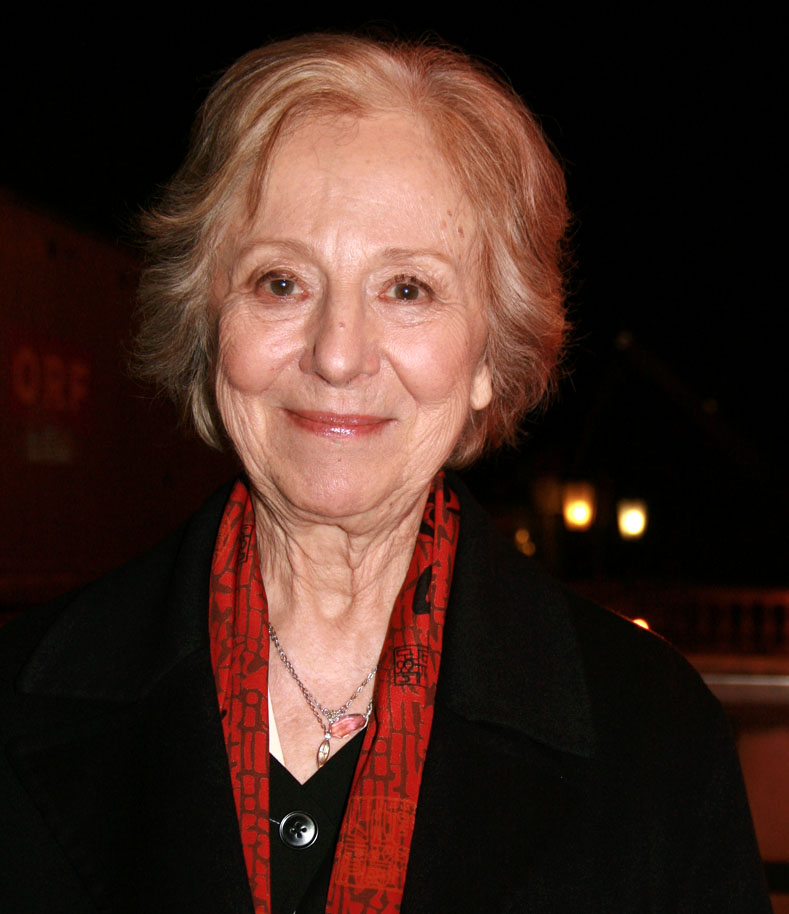
- Zeller in 2010
- Born: 25 February 1928; Vienna, Austria
- Died: 16 July 2023 (aged 95); Vienna, Austria
- Other names: Bibiana Zeller-Stark
- Occupation: Actress
- Years active: 1952–2016
- Spouse(s): Otto Anton Eder (divorced); Eugen Stark (died 2021)
- Children: 2
- Relatives: Katharina Stemberger (daughter-in-law)

Bibiana Zeller (25 February 1928 – 16 July 2023) was an Austrian actress of stage, film, and television.

== Early life and career ==
Zeller was born on 25 February 1928. She completed acting training at what is now the Franz Schubert Conservatory. In 1951 she began her acting career with an engagement at the Theater in der Josefstadt. From 1952 she worked in a number of major German cities, always coming back to Josefstadt for guest performances. From 1956 she worked for fifteen years as a freelance actress, was in Herbert Wochinz's ensemble at the Theater am Fleischmarkt and at the comedy plays in Spittal an der Drau. She was also closely connected to the Theater am Kurfürstendamm in Berlin, the comedy in Stuttgart and the Theater Bonn. In 1972 she moved to the ensemble of the Burgtheater in Vienna, of which she was still a member.

From the early 1950s, she appeared in numerous films, television plays, film adaptations of theater material and television series. Among them in Carl Merz's Passion of a Politician, in which she played the female lead Melanie, wife of National Councilor Bröschl. She became known to a broader public in Helmut Zenker's cult crime series Kottan (directed by Peter Patzak), in which she shone as Ilse Kottan. In Julia - An Unusual Woman she played the role of Hertha Mähr in 1999 and 2000.

== Personal life ==
Zeller was married to her fellow actor Eugen Stark, who died in 2021. She has two sons from her first marriage to the director Otto Anton Eder. One of them is cameraman Fabian Eder, who is married to actress Katharina Stemberger. Zeller died in Vienna on 16 July 2023, at the age of 95.

== Filmography ==
- 1958: Die Conways und die Zeit
- 1962: Der fidele Bauer
- 1962: Parlez-vous français?
- 1965: Die verhängnisvolle Faschingsnacht
- 1966: Minister gesucht
- 1966: Das Märchen
- 1967: Ein Monat auf dem Lande
- 1967: Das Veilchen
- 1969: Kampl
- 1969: Schwester Bonaventura
- 1969: Smeraldina
- 1970: Zug fährt Wiental
- 1970: Das weite Land
- 1970: Passion eines Politikers
- 1970: Blaues Wild
- 1970: Die Prinzessin und der Schweinehirt
- 1971: Wiener Totentanz
- 1972: Die Abenteuer des braven Soldaten Schwejk
- 1972: Der Illegale
- 1972: Elisabeth Kaiserin von Österreich
- 1972: Tatort: Die Samtfalle
- 1973: Kain
- 1973: Hallo – Hotel Sacher … Portier!
- 1973: Ein junger Mann aus dem Innviertel
- 1976: Tatort: Annoncen-Mord
- 1976–1983: Kottan ermittelt
- 1978: Vor Gericht seh’n wir uns wieder
- 1980: Die Einfälle der heiligen Klara
- 1986: Der Leihopa – … und er singt so schön!
- 1988: Der Vorhang fällt
- 1992: Duett
- 1992: Ferien mit Silvester
- 1993: Die skandalösen Frauen
- 1994: Die Knickerbocker-Bande: Das sprechende Grab
- 1995: Zum Glück gibt’s meine Frau
- 1997: Qualtingers Wien
- 1997: Lamorte
- 1998: Wie eine schwarze Möwe
- 1999: Fink fährt ab
- 1999–2000: Julia – Eine ungewöhnliche Frau
- 1999–2001: MA 2412
- 2001: Jetzt bringen wir unsere Männer um
- 2002: Der Bulle von Tölz
- 2002: Taxi für eine Leiche
- 2004: Zuckeroma
- 2006: Feine Dame
- 2007: Vier Frauen und ein Todesfall
- 2007: Hilfe! Hochzeit! – Die schlimmste Woche meines Lebens
- 2008: SOKO Kitzbühel
- 2008: Polly Adler – Die Asche ihrer Mutter
- 2008: Meine liebe Familie
- 2008: Lilly Schönauer
- 2008–2011: Oben ohne
- 2009: Tatort: Altlasten
- 2010: Live Is Life
- 2010: Oh Shit!
- 2010: Lüg weiter, Liebling
- 2011: Adel Dich
- 2011: Der Wettbewerb
- 2012: Hochzeiten
- 2012: Braunschlag
- 2012: Obendrüber, da schneit es
- 2012: The Last Ride
- 2012: Pastewka
- 2013: Flaschenpost an meinen Mann
- 2013: Just Married
- 2013: Live Is Life 2
- 2014: Um Himmels Willen
