= Tales from the Vienna Woods (disambiguation) =

Tales from the Vienna Woods ("Geschichten aus dem Wienerwald") is a waltz by Johann Strauss II.

Tales from the Vienna Woods may also refer to:

- Tales from the Vienna Woods (play), a 1931 play by Ödön von Horváth
- Tales from the Vienna Woods (1928 film), a German silent film
- Tales from the Vienna Woods (1934 film), an Austrian musical film
- Tales from the Vienna Woods (1979 film), an Austrian drama film
