= Hannah (1997 film) =

1996 film

- Directed by: Reinhard Schwabenitzky
- Written by: Reinhard Schwabenitzky
- Starring: Elfi Eschke
- Release date: 4 September 1997
- Running time: 118 minutes
- Country: Austria
- Language: German

Hannah is a 1997 Austrian thriller film directed by Reinhard Schwabenitzky. The film was selected as the Austrian entry for the Best Foreign Language Film at the 69th Academy Awards, but was not accepted as a nominee.

== Cast ==
- Elfi Eschke as Hannah Fischer
- August Zirner as Wolfgang Heck
- Jürgen Hentsch as Thomas Hochstedt
- Paul Herwig as Helge Hochstedt
- Max Tidof as Pollak

== See also ==
- List of submissions to the 69th Academy Awards for Best Foreign Language Film
- List of Austrian submissions for the Academy Award for Best Foreign Language Film
