= Reinhard Schwabenitzky =

Austrian film director, film producer, and screenwriter (1947–2022)

- Born: 23 April 1947; Bucheben (Rauris), Salzburg, Allied-occupied Austria
- Died: 9 February 2022 (aged 74)
- Education: HTL, Mödling
- Occupations: film director film producer screenwriter
- Spouse(s): 1. ______; 2. Elfi Eschke
- Children: 3
- Parent(s): Gerhard Schwabenitzky (later Gerhard Klingenberg); Else Schwab (today Else Kar)

Reinhard Schwabenitzky (23 April 1947 – 9 February 2022) was an Austrian film director, producer and screenwriter.

== Life and career ==
Reinhard Schwabenitzky was born in his maternal grandmother's pub in the remote hamlet of Bucheben, a long walk along the valley to the south of Rauris, which is a small town in the mountains of the State of Salzburg, positioned an hour or so by car (in the summers) to the south of Salzburg itself. Gerhard Klingenberg, his father, was an actor. He would later describe his childhood as short of material benefits, but happy. During his early school years there was still no electricity supply. The farmhouse was lit with kerosine lamps. His 3 km / 2 mile walk down to school, and back up again at the end of the day, created memories in him that would endure.

In 1951 his parents moved to Sankt Pölten in connection with his father's work. Reinhard Schwabenitzky appeared in his first acting roles at the age of just 4 at the Municipal Theater in Sankt Pölten ("St. Pöltner Stadttheater"), under the direction of his father. Two years later the child had to bid farewell to then theatre when his parents divorced. He was sent to live with an aunt and an uncle in a relatively remote mountain village called Mittersill. He later went back to live with his grandmother and his Uncle Erwin who ran the family farm in the mountains south of Rauris. When he had time available it was assumed unquestioningly that he too should work on the farm, and during his summer school vacations he took his turn in taking the cattle to the higher pastures. His mother remarried when he was 9. He moved with his mother and stepfather along with his grandmother to their newly acquired guest house, the "Itzlinger Hof", in Salzburg. The culture shock of the change was considerable and initially, finding no friends at his new school, he became lonely. There was no pure mountain air and few mountain views in the city. On the other hand there were cinemas, and as far as his pocket money allowed he became a regular cinema-goer. Eventually he began to make friends, but at that point he was sent for two years to a boarding school. Those two years he would later describe as the worst in his life. But there was much to learn. There were new concepts such as falsehood, injustice, untruthfulness and personal censorship. The head teacher at the school was a priest, and Reinhard Schwabenitzky found that the times that, as the son of a peasant family in the mountains, he had set aside for attending Mass, he now preferred to dedicate to cinema visits.

After his parents' divorce he remained in contact with his father whom he visited several times. His father had moved to East Berlin and was working at the vast Babelsberg Film Studios as a film director. The boy was able to help with the filming, saw the studios, the cutting rooms and the cameras. He watched the film shooting and cutting and, aged just 11, met Wolfgang Staudte, whom he would later come to revere as one of the best film directors ever. Without his being aware of it at the time, Reinhard Schwabenitzky's visits as a boy to his father in East Berlin did much to define the course of his later professional life.

When he was 14 Reinhard Schwabenitzky started a band, but the venture was short-lived since he was sent away to school again, this time attending a large "Technical College" ("Höhere Technische Lehranstalt" / HTL) at Mödling, just outside Vienna. He studied at the Electrical Engineering department. He did not take naturally to the technical aspects of the course but was keen to emerge with a respectable qualification. He had entered the college with the ambition to become an actor, but by the time he successfully completed his course, receiving his "Matura" diploma in 1968, this had shifted. He now prepared to build a career as a film director.

After his three years at Mödling he returned to Salzburg where his grandmother was still running the "Hotel Restaurant Itzlinger Hof", a responsibility which would pass down the generations only in 2003. He now had more time for cinema visits, and he resumed playing in a band. During summers in 1967/68 he took work as a lighting technician during the Salzburg Festival, which led to encounters with the musical stars of the day, including Herbert von Karajan, Karl Böhm, Jacqueline du Pré and Oscar Fritz Schuh. He gained admission to the University of Vienna to study not the film directing course but the camera course. He had by this time taken to 8 mm film photography as a hobby. However, once he had enrolled at the university, he was eventually able to switch to a more appropriate curriculum package. He also found time to take plenty of casual work in film and television production, and when there was no casual work he could sometimes be found in a dark corner at the Burgtheater during rehearsals, watching and learning. While still a student Reinhard Schwabenitzky married. His son, Markus, was born a year later: his daughter, Martina, two years after that.

During his student years, relations with his mother's new husband were frosty, and Schwabenitzky became unwilling to accept financial support from home. He was able to find work as a director's assistant with Axel Corti, Franz Antel and Bernhard Wicki, and also worked as a cameraman on a television series and for various television commercials. He produced his own "graduation film" two years before the end of his course, and managed to have the film, "Die Lebensaufgabe" (loosely, "The Tasks of Life") shown on Austrian Television. This led to his first commission as a movie director and the production of "Schwester Martha verzichtet auf ihr Glück" (loosely "Sister Martha renounces her good fortune"). The success of this satirical piece led to a second commission, "Die Entführung einer unmuendigen Person" (loosely "The kidnapping of an irresponsible party"), a forty minute television film, and "Salz der Erde" ("Salt of the earth"). He also won a screenplay competition. The success of "Salz der Erde" triggered another television film commission, resulting in the television series "Ein echter Wiener geh nicht unter" (loosely, "You can't keep a true Viennese down", 1975-1977). By March 1975, when he took his final degree exams in Camera work and film directing, he was already a highly successful film director. Press reports highlighted the unusual situation, also asserting (incorrectly) that he had passed his degree exams "with honours". Meanwhile further successful film productions followed.

With "Ein echter Wiener geh nicht unter" Schwabenitzky won the German Goldene Kamera award. Citing restrictive factors affecting his career with Austrian Television he now relocated to Munich. His professional career went from strength to strength but his first marriage foundered. He was nevertheless able to maintain close contact with his two children.

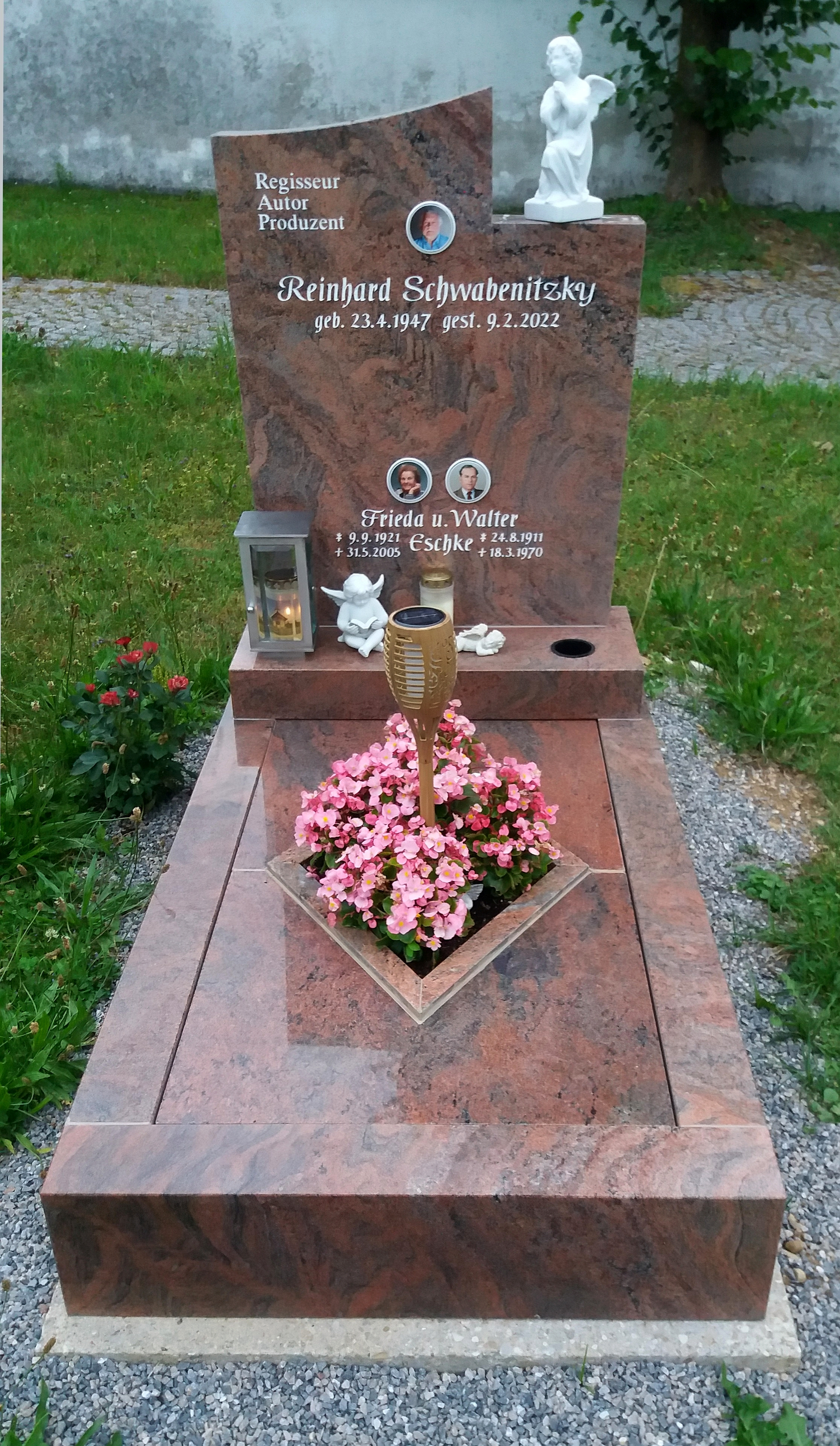
Irrsdorf near Straßwalchen: Reinhard Schwabenitzky's grave

During the 1970s and 1980s he achieved success with the thirteen part German television series Parole Chicago (1979), the six part series Tour de Ruhr (1980) and the long-running German comedy series Büro, Büro (1982-1984). Another venture involved teaming up with the actor Helmut Fischer to produce a couple of episodes of the long-running television police-drama series Tatort. There were also various cinema movies produced with the stage polymath Dieter Hallervorden.

After more than fifteen years in Bavaria, Schwabenitzky returned to Austria, by now accompanied by Elfi Eschke, his second wife. He continued to enjoy popular success, notably with the Austrian television series Kaisermühlen Blues (1992/93) and Oben ohne (2005-2011), both of which achieved cult status. In 2018 Schwabenitzky published his novel Stille Nacht und das Geheimnis der Zauberflöte.

Schwabenitzky died on 9 February 2022, at the age of 74 and was buried in Irrsdorf near Straßwalchen.

== Selected filmography ==
- Der Einstand (1977, TV film)
- Feuer! (1979, TV film)
- Parole Chicago (1979, TV series)
- Tour de Ruhr (1981, TV miniseries)
- Non-Stop Trouble with My Double (1984)
- Non-Stop Trouble with the Experts (1988)
- Eis am Stiel, 8. Teil – Summertime Blues (1988)
- Ilona und Kurti (1991)
- Verlassen Sie bitte Ihren Mann (1993)
- An Almost Perfect Affair (1996)
- Hannah (1996)
- She, Me & Her (2002)
