= Helmut Zenker =

Austrian author and scriptwriter

Herr Helmut Zenker
- Born: 10 January 1949; St. Valentin, Austria
- Died: 7 January 2003 (aged 53); Vienna, Austria
- Resting place: Vienna Central Cemetery
- Occupation: Writer
- Children: Tibor (born in 1976)
- Writing career
- Language: German
- Years active: 29
- Period: 20th Century
- Genres: Mystery, comedy
- Notable works: Detective Kottan, Rummy Blach

Helmut Zenker (January 11, 1949 – January 7, 2003) was an Austrian writer, songwriter, and screenwriter.

== Life ==
Helmut was born on January 11, 1949, in the lower Austrian city of St. Valentin. Not much is known about his early life or his parents or siblings.

He studied at a teaching academy in Vienna and worked at primary and special schools in Vienna and Tyrol. He also worked as a truck driver and projectionist.

In 1969, he founded Wespennest, a literary magazine, with Peter Henisch.

Starting in 1973, Zenker became a freelance writer and participated in author readings, including at the left-wing festival, Volksstimmfest, located in the Prater.

Helmut is the father of Tibor Zenker (7 March 1976) who, as of February 2021, is the chairman of the Party of Labor of Austria.

== Writing ==
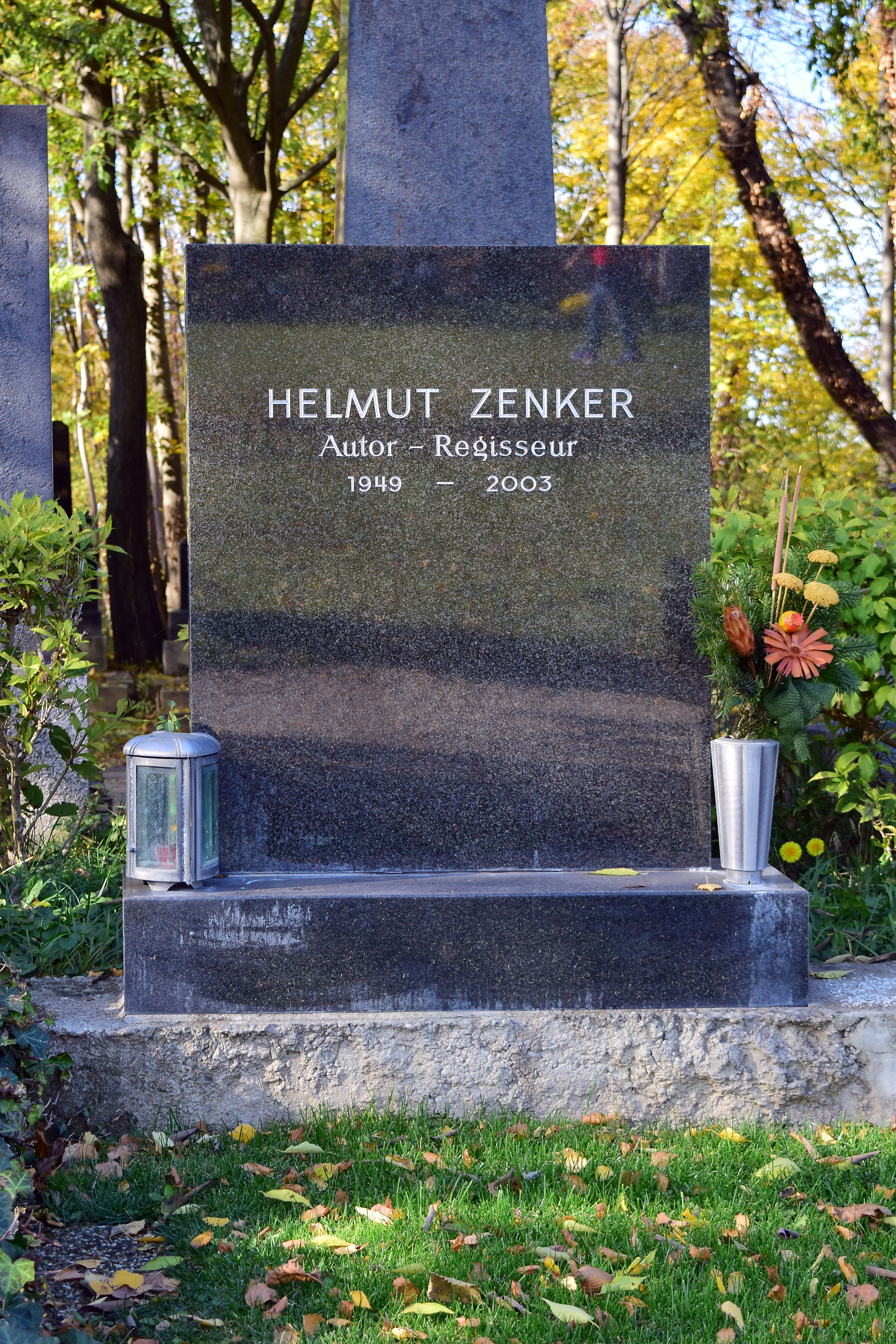
Zenker's grave

Zenker began his writing career in 1974 with a series of books about the Viennese police major Adolf Kottan, but it was not published. He turned the book into a radio drama which was produced in 1975 by the SWF.

Helmut saw great success in 1976. His first play, "Insanely Happy" was directed by Gustav Manker and premiered at the Vienna Volkstheater starring Karlheinz Hackl and included Rudolf Jusits. Major Kottan saw his screen debut in a 90-minute television film at ORF. It was directed by Peter Patzak who also staged all other Kottan episodes. The series produced from 1976 to 1983 Kottan gained particular popularity with Lukas Resetarits in the lead role.

In 1990, Zenker founded CABAL Buchmacher in which only books by Helmut Zenker were published.

From 1990 to 1998, the successful TV series Tohuwabohu, written by Zenker, was produced starring Jazz Gitti, Franz Suhrada and Ossy Kolmann.

In 2010, a new Kottan Investigates movie called "Rien ne va Plus" and was reminiscent of James Bond. The script was written by Helmut's son, Jan, and the film was directed by Peter Patzek. Lukas Resetarits reprises his role or the main character.

In November 2016, "Kottan - Der Puppenmusical" was performed in Vienna's Rabenhof Theatre. It starred Christian Dolezal and Nikolaus Habjan worked the puppets. Zenker's son, Tibor, has commented that he thought his dad would have enjoyed the show. Tibor was co-author of the musical.

== Politics ==
Zenker was a member of the Communist Party of Austria.

== Death ==
He died on January 7, 2003, in Vienna, Austria, at the age of 53. The cause of death was renal failure due to a tumor. He is buried in an honorary grave in Vienna Central Cemetery. (group 40, number 89)

== Cover art ==
The single by Hans Krankl used for the Lonely Boys had an album cover painted by Sammy Konkolits.

== Works ==
Mystery Novels

- Kottan Investigates (books, TV episodes, comics and audio)
  - Middle Austria ISBN 978-3902471130
  - Threatening Letters ISBN 978-3902471147
  - Sleep ISBN 978-3902471154
  - Danger of Firing ISBN 978-3902471161
  - The Fourth Man ISBN 978-3902471178
  - History from the Viennese Forest ISBN 978-3902471185
  - Hartl Lane 16a ISBN 978-3902471116
  - Inspector Gives Kan ISBN 978-3902471383
  - Lonely Boys ISBN 978-3216307071
  - Death of a Vending Machine Operator ISBN 978-3990419922
  - Burli (audio)
  - Headstand (audio)
  - Faithful (audio)
  - Beautiful Italy (audio)
  - Ping Pong (audio)
  - Rabengasse 3a (audio)
  - The Letter of the Minister (audio)
  - New Comicstrips 1 (comics)
  - New Comicstrips 4 (comics)
  - Comicstrips 6 (comics)
  - A Feast for Heribert: Kottan Comic No. 5 (comics)
  - Burli: Kottan Comic Nr. 6 (comics)
  - Middle Vienna: Kottan Comic Special Edition No. 1 (comics)
  - Threatening letters: Kottan Comic Special Edition No. 2 (comics)
  - No Case for Kottan, Episode 4 (TV)
  - Break with Consequences, Episode 5 (TV)
  - Genius and Chance, Episode 14 (TV)
  - The Ducks of the President, Episode 15 ISBN 978-3902471963
  - Smokey and Baby and Bear, Episode 16 ISBN 978-3902471932
  - My Hobby - Murder, Episode 17 ISBN 978-3902471925
  - Mabuse Returns, Episode 19 (TV)
  - Murder 1927, Episode 25 (TV)
- Minni Mann
  - Detective ISBN 978-3902471000
  - The Man Himself ISBN 978-3902471048
  - The Man is Dead and Sends His Regards ISBN 978-3902471031
  - The Man in the Moon ISBN 978-3902471024
  - Little Man - What Now? ISBN 9783203510699
- Rummy Blach
  - Introduction (audio)
  - Lonely Boys (audio)
  - Keep Swinging (audio)
  - Above All Treetops is Peace (audio)
  - You Are Going To Die Happy With Me (audio)
  - Nothing Works (1990) (audio)
  - Viennese Blood (audio)
  - Murder of My Dreams (audio)
  - Dirty Rummy (audio)
  - Dying is Forbidden (audio)
  - The Emperor Sends Out His Soldiers (audio)
  - Here Comes the Night (audio)
  - Sigurd Returns (audio)
  - Mother, Father, Child (audio)
  - While the Tequila Lasts (audio)
- Neon City, 1991

Poems and Prose

- 1972 Action Cleanliness (poems and prose) ISBN 978-3902471888
- 2003 Lunar Stories (short prose) ISBN 978-3216306814

Children's Novels

- 1976: Mr. Novak Makes Stories ISBN 978-3472864141
- 1977: Martin the Dragon ISBN 978-3902471369
- 1988: Martin the Dragon and the Kidnapped Ghost ISBN 978-3902471949
- 1991: Kassandro

Anthology

- 1975: Köck
- 1978: The Removal of the Caretaker ISBN 978-3472864592

Novels

- 1973: Who Are the Strangers Here? ISBN 978-3885920236
- 1974: Kassbach ISBN 978-3902471413
- 1974: For Someone Like You (with Friedemann Bayer)
- 1977: The Frog Festival ISBN 978-3902471222
- 1988: Hinterland ISBN 978-3902471437
- 2009: The Gymnast ISBN 978-3902471895
- 2014: Fabulous Fables ISBN 978-3902471444

Other writings

- 1978: The High School Student (narration)
- 2003: Tohuwabohu (book to the television series)

Radio Plays

- 1975: "Kottan Identified" (SWF / ORF)
- 1976: "The Representative" (together with Gernot Wolfgruber)
- 1976: "Mother, Father, Child" (together with Gernot Wolfgruber) SWF
- 1977: "The Window" (SR / WDR)
- 1978: "High Noon" (together with Gernot Wolfgruber)
- 1979: "Supply and Demand" (SWF)
- 1979: "Chance" (ORF / Styria)

TV Movies

- Kottan Investigates, 1976–1985, directed by Peter Patzak
- Now or Never, 1980, directed by Peter Patzak
- Thought Chain, 1979, directed by Dieter Lemmel
- Match, 1980, directed by Peter Patzak
- Beruf Santa Claus, 1981, Director Ernst Josef Lauscher
- The Investigator, 1985
- The Fourth Man, 1991–1995 Director Kurt Junek
- Tohuwabohu, 1990–1998

Movies

- 1978: Kassbach – Ein Porträt, directed by Peter Patzak, with Walter Kohut, Davy, Buchrieser, Hanno Pöschl, Heinz Petters, Erni Mangold, Heinrich Strobele
- 1978: Schwitzkasten, directed by John Cook, with Hermann Juranek, Christa Schubert
- 1981: The Uppercrust, directed by Peter Patzak, with Franz Buchrieser, Walter Davy, Peter Neubauer, Frank Gorshin, Bibiane Zeller, Lukas Resetarits, Maria Bill, Broderick Crawford
- 1983: Artichoke, directed by John Cook, with Maryline Abecassis, Catherine Dressler, Johanna Froidl, Sibylle Kos, Michael Riebl
- 1984: Tiger: Springtime in Vienna, directed by Peter Patzak, with Art Metrano, Eddie Constantine, Veronika Faber, Heinz Moog, William Berger, Lukas Resetarits

Play

- 1976: "Insanely happy" (folk play) Volkstheater Wien
