= Tales from the Vienna Woods (play) =

Play by Austro-Hungarian writer Ödön von Horváth

Tales from the Vienna Woods (German: Geschichten aus dem Wiener Wald, 1931) is a play by Austro-Hungarian writer Ödön von Horváth.

== Plot ==
The play is set in Wachau, Josefstadt, and the Vienna Woods just before the Austrofascist takeover. It tells the fate of a naive young woman, Marianne, who breaks off her reluctant engagement with Oskar after falling in love with a fop named Alfred who, however, has no serious interest in returning her love. For this error, she must pay bitterly. Werner Pirchner composed the incidental music to the play.

== Background ==
Horvath's play premièred in Berlin in 1931 and has been filmed several times. Before the première, the German writer and playwright, Carl Zuckmayer nominated the play for the Kleist Prize, which it won, the most significant literary award of the Weimar Republic. The play's title is a reference to the waltz "Tales from the Vienna Woods" by Johann Strauss II.

The play's premiere took place at the Deutsches Theater, Berlin. Written in the late 1920s during the period of catastrophic unemployment and the Great Depression, the play is a key work of modern drama, described by Erich Kästner as "a Viennese folk play accompanied by Viennese folk songs". It is a bitter satire about the mendacity and brutality of the petite-bourgeoisie, named ironically after the Vienna Woods near the Austrian capital that are so idealised in the waltz. In the play, Viennese Gemütlichkeit or "coziness" becomes a hollow phrase; the tragic, brutal story of the sweet girl Marianne and the deeply conventional butcher Oskar reflects the hardships and anxieties of the late 1920s during the global economic crisis.

== Adaptations ==
=== Film ===
The play was filmed in 1961 by director Erich Neuberg, starring Johanna Matz (Marianne), Walter Kohut (Alfred), Hans Moser (reprising his role of Marianne's father from the 1931 Berlin premiere), Helmut Qualtinger (Oskar) and Jane Tilden (Valerie), among others.

Another version was made for television in 1964, directed by Michael Kehlmann, starring Helmuth Lohner.

A 1979 remake was undertaken by director Maximilian Schell, featuring Birgit Doll (Marianne), Hanno Pöschl (Alfred), Helmut Qualtinger (Zauberkönig), Jane Tilden (Valerie), Adrienne Gessner (Alfred's Grandmother), Götz Kauffmann (Oskar), André Heller (Hierlinger) and Robert Meyer (Erich).

- Légendes de la forêt viennoise (1993) directed by André Engel
- Geschichten aus dem Wiener Wald (1999) directed by Martin Kušej
- Geschichten aus dem Wienerwald (2013) directed by Herbert Fottinger and Andre Turnheim.

=== Opera ===
Tales from the Vienna Woods, a 2014 opera by composer HK Gruber to a libretto by Michael Sturminger. It premiered at the Bregenz Festival under the direction of the librettist and the baton of the composer.

=== Stage ===
Christopher Hampton, who had provided the English translation of the play for Maximilian Schell's London production of January 1977, used von Horváth as a character in his 1983 play Tales from Hollywood to draw parallels between Austrian society of the 1930s, as depicted in von Horváth's original work, and Hollywood's treatment of film-makers escaping from European fascism to find work in the American entertainment industry.
