= Tohuwabohu (disambiguation) =

Tohuwabohu (Hebrew "formless and void"), is a phrase found at the beginning of Genesis in the Hebrew Bible

Tohuwabohu, or spelling variants, can refer to:

- Tohuwabohu, 1920 German novel by Sammy Gronemann
- Tohuwabohu (TV series), Austrian cabaret TV series 1990 - 1998
- Tohuvabohu (album): album by band KMFDM
