= Elfi Eschke =

German actress, born 1951

- Born: 8 December 1951 (age 74); Bremen, West Germany
- Education: Hochschule für Musik und Theater, Hamburg
- Occupations: Stage actress Screen actress
- Spouse: Reinhard Schwabenitzky (1947–2022)
- Children: Lucas Schwabenitzky (actor)
- Parent(s): Walter & Frieda Eschke

Elfi Eschke is a German-Austrian stage and screen actress who came to prominence during the 1980s and 1990s, taking starring roles in generally light-hearted television dramas and movies directed by Reinhard Schwabenitzky (1947–2022), whom during the 1980s she married. In a 2021 interview, given to mark her seventieth birthday, Eschke confessed to a parallel career as the landlady at the "Itzlinger Hof" (Hotel-Restaurant) in Salzburg.

== Biography ==
=== Provenance and early years ===
Elfi Eschke was born in Bremen. Walter Eschke, her father, is described as a "master painter", and her mother, Frieda, as a housewife. She regularly tells interviewers that she knew, from a very early age, that she wished to become an actress by profession; and as soon as she had completed her compulsory schooling she enrolled as a student at the dramatic arts department of the Hochschule für Musik und Theater (College of Arts) in nearby Hamburg. During her studies she supported herself through a combination of office work, waitressing and, for a time, working as a sales assistant in a shoe shop. She was still a student when she accepted a brief engagement with the Theater Bonn.

=== Reinhard Schwabenitzky ===
Elfi Eschke married Reinhard Schwabenitzky in around 1990, thereby acquiring two step children from her husband's first marriage. The couple's third child, Lucas, was born in around 1994, and became a television actor while still a child, by most criteria. Reinhard Schwabenitzky and Elfi Eschke met and became friends and the early 1980s when Eschke was working on film dramas for Südwestfunk in Baden-Baden. The relationship with Schwabenitzky had an important - and evidently positive - impact on Eschke's career in acting and also, in due course, led her to relocate with her new partner/husband to Flachau in the Salzburg region, though it was only in 2014 that Eschke took the step of acquiring Austrian citizenship, thereby becoming, in terms of the relevant nationality legislation, a German-Austrian dual national.

In 2003 Reinhard Schwabenitzky and Elfi Eschke took over the management of the "Itzlinger Hof" hotel in Salzburg from Schwabenitzky's mother, and for more than a decade both Schwabenitzky and Eschke combined their film careers with hands-on hotel-restaurant management. The business was sold in 2016. Reinhard Schwabenitzky died on 9 February 2022, leaving Elfi Eschke a widow.

== Work ==
After graduating from college, Eschke embarked on the conventional, if informal, apprenticeship route, building up her experience on the provincial theatre circuit. Her first experience as a real-world stage actress came at the City Theatre on Pforzheim. She later wrote of the experience as "her first culture shock, or rather ... professional shock". (Note: her "... erster Kulturschock oder besser: Berufsschock") That was followed by a longer stint at the Theater Baden-Baden, some 25 kilometers / 15 miles south of Karlsruhe. Baden-Baden had been the head office location for Südwestfunk, the regional radio and (increasingly) television broadcasting organisation ever since the military administrators in the French occupation zone had grudgingly permitted its creation between 1946 and 1948. Her work in the local theatre soon brought Eschke to the attention of Südwestfunk managers, and she quickly became popular as a radio-play announcer. That work was soon complemented by minor acting roles in low-budget locally produced television dramas.

A critical turning point came in 1981 with the six-part television drama "Tour de Ruhr", featuring Harald Schlümer, a Dortmund railway employee, and his girlfriend, Ines, who together team up with a colleague of Schlümer's called Karlheinz Stratmann, along with Stratmann's wife Elisabeth, their couple's daughter Martina and Wölfchen, Martina's friend/admirer, for a cycling holiday. In many ways the starring role is taken by the countryside and the industrial heritage in the hill country east of Dortmund, but there are also plenty of arguments, marital differences, jealousies and punctured bicycle tyres to entertain television audiences. Having been screened in 1981 by the Cologne-based WDR Fernsehen (television) company, the show was repeated, this time becoming a Sunday afternoon feature across West Germany, screened on ARD 1 in 1983. "Tour de Ruhr" was directed by Reinhard Schwabenitzky, who had built a reputation as a director of mass-appeal television comedy drama in his native Vienna during the 1970s. Playing the role of the girl-friend, Ines, Elfi Eschke found her face had become known across the Rhineland region overnight. There would be no going back. Schwabenitzky had already subjected her to screen tests even before casting her in "Tour de Ruhr", and together they had decided that, at least for her, the future lay not on the theatre stage but on the (at this stage) "small screen". She had turned down offers from the Theater Basel and the Schauspielhaus Zürich and relocated to Munich in pursuit of a television career. Schwabenitzky relocated from his Vienna home base to Munich at around the same time. For both of them, these moves were evidently undertaken for a combination of professional and personal reasons.

Eschke consolidated her position as a favourite with television audiences in "Büro, Büro", a comedy drama series produced by the Munich-based Bavaria Film company for television. It was launched in 1981, and by the time the final edition was screened in 1991, had run to 85 episodes. The series concerns "Lurzer KG", a fictional Mittelstand company manufacturing exercise equipment. The "dramatic personae" are headed up by the owner of the business, Dr. Herbert Brokstedt: a running joke throughout the series is the way in which Dr. Brokstedt is almost always away, either on a business trip or else engaged on some more nefarious and frequently ill-defined mission. Second on the character list is Gabi Neuhammer, a member of the team in the typing pool who is capable of gaucheness, flippancy, apparent lack of appropriate respect, but fiercely loyal. Frequently she is the employee who finds the solution to whichever implausible problem the scriptwriters have concocted for the company. She is popular with male colleagues but generally rejects unseemly advances. Nevertheless, a recurring theme revolves around the "will they: won't they?" conundrum, or indeed the "did they: didn't they?" question. The role of Gabi Neuhammer was played by Elfi Eschke. The series was masterminded and overseen by Reinhard Schwabenitzky.

A succession of further television hits followed through the 1980s, as she appeared alongside much loved stars of the German television firmament such as Helmut Fischer and Hans Clarin. By the end of the decade, with her husband, she had relocated again, this time across the border to the east back into Austria. It was not a total homecoming for Reinhard Schwabenitzky, however, since they made their new home not in Vienna but in Salzburg. It is probably at around this time that Eschke's career peaked, with leading roles in "In Zeiten wie diesen" (1990), an Austrian television series adapted by Schwabenitzky from an existing work by Wolfgang Bauer, and the feature film Ilona und Kurti, a black-humour comedy in which, under Schwabenitsky's direction, she starred opposite the Viennese actor-restaurateur, Hanno Pöschl. which won for Schwabenitsky, the Ernst Lubitsch Prize in 1992.

For Eschke, further successes in Schwabenitsky productions continued through the 1990s, such as "Kaisermühlen Blues" (1992–2000), a television series which ran to 64 episodes divided into seven sets. In 1993 Schwabenitsky, with the couple's two sons, set up his own film company, "Star*Film". "Verlassen Sie bitte Ihren Mann" (1993) also became a cinema blockbuster. "An Almost Perfect Affair", released in 1996, was another cinema success, followed in 1997 by "An Almost Perfect Divorce" and in 1999 by " An Almost Perfect Wedding". In terms of many criteria, however, it was her starring role in "Hannah" (1996) that marked Eschke's greatest cinema triumph, winning her a "best actress" prize at the Santa Barbara International Film Festival. The success of "Hannah" triggered the offer of a contract from Disney. However, this would have involved relocating to Los Angeles and, perhaps more importantly, it was far from clear whether working for the Americans would leave her with enough time to focus on her son Lucas, who was just two at the time. Family took precedence: there was no move to California.

Despite the increased focus on family after the birth of Lucas, and notwithstanding the management tasks accompanying her role as "landlady" after her husband, took over from his mother the management duties for the "Itzlinger Hof" hotel in Salzburg in 2003, Eschke continued to appear in new television drama productions by Schwabenitzky throughout and beyond the first decade of the twenty-first century. The "Star*Film" company indeed became a family affair, involving both Markus and Lucas Schwabenitzky. Lucas indeed made his public acting debut as a child star, appearing with his mother, with whom he has also featured as a "trainee chef" on a Christmas television cookery show.

== Filmography ==
=== Film ===
- 1984: Non-Stop Trouble with My Double
- 1988: Eis am Stiel 8 – Summertime Blues (Summertime Blues: Lemon Popsicle VIII)
- 1988: Non-Stop Trouble with the Experts
- 1991: Ilona und Kurti
- 1993: Verlassen Sie bitte Ihren Mann
- 1995: An Almost Perfect Affair
- 1996: Hannah
- 1997: An Almost Perfect Divorce
- 1999: An Almost Perfect Wedding
- 2002: She, Me & Her
- 2002: Zwei Väter einer Tochter
- 2010: Furcht und Zittern – Cinema drama

=== Television ===
- 1981: Tour de Ruhr
- 1982–1986: Büro, Büro
- 1983: Die 5. Jahreszeit
- 1984: Engel auf Rädern
- 1985: Die Krimistunde (TV series, Episode: "Ein Toter zuviel")
- 1986: Die Schloßherren
- 1986: Tatort: Die Macht des Schicksals (TV series episode)
- 1987: Tatort: Gegenspieler (TV series episode)
- 1987: Cop & Co
- 1987: Reschkes großer Dreh
- 1988: Und ewig ruft St. Alpi
- 1988: Der schwarze Obelisk
- 1990: In Zeiten wie diesen
- 1992–1994: Kaisermühlen Blues (TV series)
- 2001: 3 Frauen, 1 Plan und die ganz große Kohle
- 2003: Frechheit siegt
- 2004: Gefühl ist alles
- 2005: Schön, dass es dich gibt
- 2005: Conny und die verschwundene Ehefrau
- 2006–2011: Oben ohne
- 2009: Du heilige Nacht (Weihnachtsspecial aus Oben ohne)
- 2010: Eine Couch für alle
- 2010: Die türkische Braut (Special aus Oben ohne)
- 2010: Die Hüttenwirtin
- 2016: Geschichten von der Donau

== Theatre work (selection) ==
- 2003: Acht Frauen – Theater in der Josefstadt Wien (Wiener Kammerspiele)
- 2006–2007: Die Kaktusblüte – Theater in der Josefstadt Wien (Wiener Kammerspiele)
