= Franz Suhrada =

Austrian actor

Franz Suhrada (born 26 June 1954) is an Austrian actor.

== Life and career ==
Born in Vienna, Suhrada completed a professional development as an industrial clerk before entering the Schauspielschule Krauss in Vienna at the age of 19. He had his first stage engagement in 1975 - still during his training - at the Theater der Courage, which is now part of the Theater Drachengasse. For his performance in The Iron Ones by Aldo Nicolaj, he received the Critics' Prize in the same year. In 1976, he gave up his original profession and became a full-time actor. Various engagements as a theatre actor took him to Salzburg, Berlin, Hamburg, Prague, Dessau and Leipzig, among other places.

He became known to Austrian television audiences primarily through his role as policeman Schreyvogel in the ORF TV series Kottan ermittelt. He also appeared in the series Tohuwabohu, Ein echter Wiener geht nicht unter and Die Alpensaga. In the series Cafe Lotto, he played a waiter for 13 years.

He also does voice-overs for commercials and audio books. Among the audio books he has narrated are Wiener Schmankerln and two Kottan episodes published as audio books (Hartlgasse 16a and Der Geburtstag). Suhrada's most recent performances include Der Hausfreund by Eugène Marin Labiche at the Wiener Kammerspiele (2005), at the Vereinigte Bühnen Bozen in The Flea in the Ear by Georges Feydeau (2007) and The Imaginary Invalid by Molière (2007/2008), several times in major roles, directed by Felix Dvorak at the Stadttheater Berndorf and the Komödienspiele Mödling as well as at the stadtTheater walfischgasse in Die Eisernen by Aldo Nicolaj. In 2010, he appeared in the feature film Kottan ermittelt: Rien ne va plus.

== TV serials ==
- 1978: Die Alpensaga
- 1978–1983: Kottan ermittelt
- 1986: Tatort: Tatort: Der Tod des Tänzers
- 1988: Der Leihopa
- 1993: Die Leute von St. Benedikt
- 1994: Tohuwabohu
- 1996: Spiel des Lebens
- 2006: SOKO Donau
