= 1986 in Philippine television =

The following is a list of events affecting Philippine television in 1986. Events listed include television show debuts, finales, cancellations, and channel launches, closures and rebrandings, as well as information about controversies and carriage disputes.

== Events ==
- January 6 - The afternoon talent-variety program That's Entertainment makes its premiere telecast on GMA 7.
- February 7 - Coverage of the 1986 Philippine presidential election airs on all stations.
- February 24–25 - At the midst of the People Power Revolution rebel forces capture state channel MBS Channel 4 at the ABS-CBN Broadcasting Center on the 24th and private channels 2, 9 and 13 at the Broadcast City complex the day after. Pro-Marcos forces, however, earlier had attacked privately owned GMA 7 on the 23rd because of its live coverage of the events.
- March-April - At the aftermath of the People Power Revolution, BBC 2, IBC 13 and RPN 9 sequestered of the facilities.
- May 19 - GMA debuts two new newscasts, GMA Balita and GMA Headline News.
- July 14 - IBC debuts two new newscasts, Balita sa IBC and Balita sa IBC Huling Ulat.
- September 7 - BBC 2 (formerly City 2 Television) ended operations after almost 13 years.
- September 14 - After 14 years of closure, ABS-CBN Corporation and its namesake TV network were reopened at the end of Marcos' dictatorship.
- September 15 – ABS-CBN debuts two comeback newscasts, Balita Ngayon and The World Tonight

== Premieres ==
| Date | Show |
|---|---|
| January 6 | That's Entertainment on GMA 7 |
| January 6 | Mirasol del Cielo on GMA 7 |
| January 20 | Ang Panday on RPN 9 |
| February 3 | Goin' Bananas on BBC 2 |
| February 14 | Mansyon on IBC 13 |
| March 23 | Lovingly Yours, Helen on GMA 7 |
| April 7 | Pangunahing Balita Ala-Una on PTV 4 |
| April 7 | Early Evening Report on PTV 4 |
| April 7 | Early Late-Night Report on PTV 4 |
| April 14 | Verdadero on RPN 9 |
| April 16 | Heartbeat on GMA 7 |
| April 17 | Princess on GMA 7 |
| April 17 | The Pulpit of Christ on GMA 7 |
| April 18 | GMA Gems on GMA 7 |
| April 18 | Maricel Live! on IBC 13 |
| April 18 | Street Pulse on RPN 9 |
| May 19 | GMA Balita on GMA 7 |
| May 19 | GMA Headline News on GMA 7 |
| May 24 | GMA Saturday/Sunday Report on GMA 7 |
| June 9 | Lunch Date on GMA 7 |
| July 14 | Balita sa IBC on IBC 13 |
| July 14 | Balita sa IBC: Huling Ulat on IBC 13 |
| July 18 | Sitak ni Jack on IBC 13 |
| July 19 | Truth Forum on IBC 13 |
| August 8 | Vilma on GMA 7 |
| September 13 | Andrea Amor on IBC 13 |
| September 14 | The Sharon Cuneta Show on IBC 13 |
| September 15 | Magandang Umaga Po on ABS-CBN 2 |
| September 15 | ABS-CBN News Advisory on ABS-CBN 2 |
| September 15 | Balita Ngayon on ABS-CBN 2 |
| September 15 | The World Tonight on ABS-CBN 2 |
| September 15 | Nestle Special on ABS-CBN 2 |
| September 15 | Angkan on ABS-CBN 2 |
| September 15 | Luneta: Discovery Hour on ABS-CBN 2 |
| September 15 | Hilakbot on ABS-CBN 2 |
| September 15 | Ina on ABS-CBN 2 |
| September 15 | Jesus I Trust in You!: The 3:00 pm Prayer Habit on ABS-CBN 2 |
| September 16 | Let's Go Crazy with Jack & Joey on ABS-CBN 2 |
| September 16 | Regal Drama Presents on ABS-CBN 2 |
| September 17 | Lots of Catch on ABS-CBN 2 |
| September 17 | Mommy Ko, Daddy Ko! on ABS-CBN 2 |
| September 18 | Bar None on ABS-CBN 2 |
| September 18 | Napakasakit Kuya Eddie on ABS-CBN 2 |
| September 19 | Nine-Teeners on ABS-CBN 2 |
| September 19 | Overseas Unlimited on ABS-CBN 2 |
| September 20 | Bukang Liwayway on ABS-CBN 2 |
| September 20 | Cathedral of Praise with David Sumrall on ABS-CBN 2 |
| September 20 | Triple Treat on ABS-CBN 2 |
| September 20 | Business and Pleasure on ABS-CBN 2 |
| September 20 | Video Hit Parade on ABS-CBN 2 |
| September 21 | PEP (People, Events and Places) Talk on ABS-CBN 2 |
| September 24 | Womanwatch on PTV 4 |
| October 3 | Travel Time on IBC 13 |

=== Unknown ===
- Weekend with Velez on GMA 7
- ABS-CBN International Report on ABS-CBN 2
- Good Morning Philippines on ABS-CBN 2
- Parak on ABS-CBN 2
- Children's Hour on ABS-CBN 2
- In TUX icating on ABS-CBN 2
- Teen Pan Alley on ABS-CBN 2
- Entertainment Tonight on ABS-CBN 2
- Inhumanoids on ABS-CBN 2
- Teen Pan Alley on BBC 2
- Moonlighting on BBC 2
- No Permanent Address on RPN 9
- Plaza 1899 on RPN 9
- Sa Kabukiran on RPN 9
- Stop Watch on RPN 9
- Simply Snooky on RPN 9
- Sunday's Big Event on RPN 9
- Teenage Diary on RPN 9
- Kulit Bulilit on IBC 13
- Export... Made in the Philippines on IBC 13
- Star Cafe on IBC 13
- Goin' Bananas on IBC 13
- Hapi House! on IBC 13
- Sitak ni Jack on IBC 13
- Kuh by Special Arrangement on IBC 13
- Hiyas on IBC 13
- Ora Engkantada on IBC 13
- Pinoy Thriller on IBC 13
- Scoop on IBC 13
- The Keithley Report on IBC 13
- Viva Box Office Hits on IBC 13
- See True on GMA 7
- A Dialogue with Pres. C. Aquino on PTV 4
- Headline on PTV 4
- KB Kaibigan on PTV 4
- No Holds Barred on PTV 4
- Public Eye on PTV 4
- Tinig Bayan on PTV 4
- Tugon on PTV 4
- Da Young Once on PTV 4
- Mga Kwentong Buhay on PTV 4
- Pabrika on PTV 4
- Viva Drama Specials on PTV 4
- Big Ike's Happening on PTV 4
- Last Wave 1986 on PTV 4
- Maria! Maria! on PTV 4
- This Is It! on PTV 4
- People's Privilege Hour on PTV 4
- Voltes V on PTV 4
- 2+2=4 on PTV 4
- Dito Kami! on PTV 4
- Friendly Connections on PTV 4
- Start of Something Big on PTV 4
- Teentime with Snooky and Albert on PTV 4

== Returning or renamed programs ==
| Show | Last aired | Retitled as/Season/Notes | Channel | Return date |
|---|---|---|---|---|
| Philippine Basketball Association | 1985 (MBS; season 11: "Reinforced Conference") | Same (season 12: "Reinforced Conference") | PTV | April 6 |
| Major League Baseball | 1985 (MBS) | Same (1986 season) | PTV | April |
| Philippine Amateur Basketball League | 1985 (season 3: "Challenge to Champions") | Same (season 4: "Invitational Cup") | PTV | May 3 |
| Philippine Basketball Association | 1986 (season 12: "Reinforced Conference") | Same (season 12: "All-Filipino Conference") | PTV | July 6 |
| Philippine Amateur Basketball League | 1986 (season 4: "Invitational Cup") | Same (season 4: "Founder's Cup") | PTV | August |
| Balita Ngayon | 1972 | Same | ABS-CBN | September 15 |
| The World Tonight | 1972 | Same | ABS-CBN | September 15 |
| Philippine Basketball Association | 1986 (season 12: "All-Filipino Conference") | Same (season 12: "Open Conference") | PTV | September 23 |
| Philippine Amateur Basketball League | 1986 (season 4: "Founder's Cup") | Same (season 4: "Filipino Cup") | PTV | October 18 |

== Programs transferring networks ==
| Date | Show | No. of seasons | Moved from | Moved to |
|---|---|---|---|---|
| March 23 | Lovingly Yours, Helen | —N/a | BBC (now ABS-CBN) | GMA |
| Unknown | Goin' Bananas | —N/a | BBC (now ABS-CBN) | IBC |
| Unknown | See True | —N/a | IBC | GMA |
| Unknown | Voltes V | —N/a | GMA | PTV |

== Finales ==
- March 16: Lovingly Yours, Helen on BBC 2
- May 16:
  - News at Seven on GMA 7
  - The 11:30 Report on GMA 7
- June 7: Student Canteen on GMA 7
- July 11:
  - Newsday on IBC 13
  - Mid-day Report on IBC 13
- September 5:
  - BBC Balita on BBC 2
  - The Big, Big Show on BBC 2
- September 6:
  - I Am What I Am on BBC 2
  - Pssssst! on BBC 2
- September 7:
  - Astro Quiz Show on BBC 2
  - Seeing Stars with Joe Quirino on 2 on BBC 2
- November 21:
  - Luneta: Discovery Hour on ABS-CBN 2
  - Hilakbot on ABS-CBN 2
- December 12: Ina on ABS-CBN 2

=== Unknown ===
- NewsCenter 4 on MBS 4
- Manila Envelope on MBS 4
- Ang Iglesia ni Cristo on PTV 4
- Business Talks on PTV 4
- Friendly Connections on PTV 4
- Good Morning Manila on MBS 4
- Inquiry on PTV 4
- KB Kaibigan on PTV 4
- Last Wave 1986 on PTV 4
- Trends on PTV 4
- MBS Primetime Movie on MBS 4
- In TUX icating on ABS-CBN 2
- Lots of Catch on ABS-CBN 2
- Bar None on ABS-CBN 2
- Overseas Unlimited on ABS-CBN 2
- Good Morning Philippines on ABS-CBN 2
- Goin' Bananas on BBC 2
- VIP (Vilma in Person) on BBC 2
- Sharing In the City on BBC 2
- Teen Pan Alley on BBC 2
- Ang Iglesia ni Cristo on BBC 2
- Moonlighting on BBC 2
- Sesame Street on BBC 2
- The Edison Twins on BBC 2
- Pointblank on IBC 13
- Seeing Stars with Joe Quirino on IBC 13
- Turn on 13 on IBC 13
- IBCinema on IBC 13
- See True on IBC 13
- The Keithley Report on IBC 13
- Kahapon Lamang on GMA 7
- The Bob Stewart Show on GMA 7
- Discorama on GMA 7
- Uncle Bob and Friends on GMA 7
- Pass the Mike with JQ and Willie on GMA 7
- Stop, Look & Listen on GMA 7
- Two for the Road on GMA 7
- Pasikatan sa Siete on GMA 7
- Ecotrends on GMA 7
- No Permanent Address on RPN 9
- Sa Kabukiran on RPN 9
- Sinebisyon on RPN 9
- Street Pulse on RPN 9

== Channels ==
=== Launches ===
- September 14: ABS-CBN

=== Rebranded ===
The following is a list of television stations that have made or will make noteworthy network rebranded in 1986.

| Date | Rebranded from | Rebranded to | Channel | Source |
|---|---|---|---|---|
| February 24 | MBS | New TV 4 | 4 | |
| April 5 | New TV 4 | PTV | 4 | |

=== Closures ===
- September 7: BBC 2

== Births ==
- January 4 – Katrina Halili, actress
- January 13 – Jan Manual, actor and TV Host
- January 25 – Luane Dy, actress and TV host
- January 26 –
  - Ervic Vijandre, Filipino actor and basketball player
  - Kian Kazemi, Iranian-Filipino actor, reality show contestant and TV host
- February 7 – Hermes Bautista, Filipino-American actor
- February 12 – Georgina Wilson, Filipino-British actress and TV host
- February 14 – Roxanne Guinoo, actress
- February 18 – Brenan Espartinez, Filipino singer (former child actor)
- March 1 – Sophia Montecarlo
- March 10 – JC de Vera, Filipino actor, host and model
- March 18 – Bianca King, Filipina-German model and actress
- March 28 – Dion Ignacio, actor and TV Host
- April 28 - Tom Taus, actor and TV Host
- May 16 – Shamcey Supsup, model, TV host and Miss Universe Philippines 2011 winner
- May 26 –
  - Alex Medina, Filipino, film and television actor
  - Geoff Taylor, is a Filipino singer, model and actor
- June 8 – Japoy Lizardo, Filipino taekwondo, practitioner, actor and commercial model.
- June 12 – Carla Abellana, actress
- June 13 – Ayanna Oliva, Filipina, model, singer, dancer, host DJ and VJ
- June 29 – Iya Villania, Filipino-Australian actress and TV host
- August 10 – Mercedes Cabral, actress
- August 29 – Joem Bascon, actor
- August 30 – Franz Ocampo, Broadcaster (Former Actress & TV Host)
- August 31 – Rachelle Ann Go, singer and actress
- September 13 – Sugar Mercado, Filipino dancer and actress
- September 27 – Chai Fonacier, actress and singer
- October 2 – Pancho Magno, actor
- October 13 – Dave Valentino, Broadcaster and TV Personality
- October 22 – Matt Evans, actor
- November 4 – Angelica Panganiban, actress
- November 5 – Dianne Medina, actress, dancer, TV host and model
- November 22 – Erika Padilla, Filipino actress, TV host, model and sideline reporter
- November 23 – Maxene Magalona, actress
- December 14 – Mark Herras, actor
- December 21 – Karel Marquez, actress, model, singer and TV host
- December 29 –
  - Chris Cayzer, Filipino-Australian soul, R&B and acoustic singer, actor, DJ and VJ.
  - Ina Feleo, actress, figure skater, dancer and writer
- December 31 – Mike Tan, actor

== See also ==
- 1986 in the Philippines
- 1986 in television
