= The Seventh Continent (1989 film) =

1989 film

- Directed by: Michael Haneke
- Written by: Michael Haneke; Johanna Teicht
- Produced by: Veit Heiduschka
- Starring: Dieter Berner; Birgit Doll; Leni Tanzer
- Cinematography: Anton Peschke
- Edited by: Marie Homolkova
- Music by: Alban Berg
- Distributed by: Wega Film
- Release date: 1989
- Running time: 104 minutes
- Country: Austria
- Language: German

The Seventh Continent (German: Der siebente Kontinent) is a 1989 Austrian psychological drama film directed by Michael Haneke. It is Haneke's debut feature film. The film chronicles three years in the life of an Austrian family, which consists of Georg, an engineer; his wife Anna, an optometrist; and their young daughter, Eva. They lead a seemingly routine urban middle-class life, but are actually planning something sinister. The film was selected as the Austrian entry for the Best Foreign Language Film at the 62nd Academy Awards, but was not accepted as a nominee.

== Plot ==
Divided into three parts, the film devotes its first two segments titled "1987" and "1988" to depicting a single day in the family's life through detailed, larger wordless sequences that convey their discomfort with modern societal routines. Near the beginning of each part, a voiceover features the wife reading a letter to her husband's parents to inform them of his professional success, introducing a series of recurring, parallel daily activities.

The third part, "1989", begins with the family departing from the grandparents' home after a visit. The husband then narrates a letter, written the next day, informing them that he and his wife have resigned from their jobs and decided "to leave". It plays over clips of them quitting, closing their bank account, telling the bank clerk they are emigrating to Australia, selling their car, and buying a large variety of cutting tools. He then says it was a very hard decision whether or not to take their daughter Eva with them, but they decided to do so after she said she was not afraid of death.

The family eats a luxurious meal. While eating, they receive a phone call and leave the phone dangling there to prevent any other calls. They then systematically destroy every possession in the house in an automatic and passionless manner, with barely any speaking. They rip up all of their money and flush it down the toilet. The only emotion shown is when Georg shatters their large fish tank, and his daughter screams and cries hysterically amidst the dying fish. While destroying the house, the phone company comes by, telling them that they must put the phone back on the line. Georg then uses cotton to muffle the bells for the phone and doorbell. Finally, they kill themselves by overdosing on pills dissolved in water; first Eva, then Anna, and finally Georg, who vomits up the liquid and must resort to injecting himself. Just before he dies, Georg methodically writes the names, date, and time of death of all three family members on the wall, providing a question mark for his own time of death. An envelope addressed to Georg's parents is taped to the door. In Georg's final moments, he lays beside Anna and Eva's corpses and watches the static on the TV. Scenes from the film briefly flash, implying that his life is flashing before his eyes.

At the end of the film, text says that, despite the suicide note, Georg's parents thought it may have been a homicide and a police investigation was conducted. No evidence of murder was found.

== Cast ==
- Birgit Doll as Anna
- Dieter Berner as Georg
- Leni Tanzer as Eva
- Udo Samel as Alexander
- Silvia Fenz as Optometrist's Customer
- Robert Dietl as Oertl
- Elisabeth Rath as Teacher
- Georges Kern as Bank Clerk
- Georg Friedrich as Postal Clerk

== Title ==
The film's title is a reference to Australia, the continent mentioned in the film as the family's destination. Its image is visualized as an isolated beach and desert, with a mountain range on the left border and pool of water with mysterious waves (which are clearly physically impossible) in between. Australia is symbolised as the ideal place to escape to for the doomed Austrian family. It appears in the first two parts and as the last image in a series of flashbacks shown before the death of Georg.

== Background ==
Michael Haneke said that the film is based on a news article he read about a family who committed suicide in this manner; police discovered that their money was flushed because bits of currency were found in the plumbing. Haneke claims to have correctly predicted to the producer that audiences would be upset with that scene, and remarked that in today's society the idea of destroying money is more taboo than parents killing their child and themselves.

== Reception ==
The film was awarded Bronze Leopard at the Locarno International Film Festival and the prize for Best Application of Music and Sound in Film at the Ghent International Film Festival. On the review aggregator website Rotten Tomatoes, 67% of 6 critics' reviews are positive. Metacritic, which uses a weighted average, assigned the film a score of 89 out of 100, based on 7 critics, indicating "universal acclaim".

== See also ==
- List of submissions to the 62nd Academy Awards for Best Foreign Language Film
- List of Austrian submissions for the Academy Award for Best Foreign Language Film
