= Birgit Doll =

Austrian actress (1956–2015)

- Born: 9 March 1956; Vienna, Austria
- Died: 26 October 2015 (aged 59); Austria
- Occupations: Actress; Theatre director
- Years active: 1978–2015

Birgit Doll (9 March 1956 – 26 October 2015) was an Austrian actress of stage, screen and television and theatre director. She made her professional theatre debut at the age of 20 and won the Kainz Medal in 1992 for her performance of Libussa and the Nestroy Theatre Prize in 2000 for portraying Martha in Edward Albee's Wer hat Angst vor Virginia Woolf. Doll earned the Best Actress Award at the 1979 Bavarian Film Awards and the Best Actress Award at the Karlovy Vary International Film Festival in 1980 for her role as Marianne of the film Tales from the Vienna Woods.

== Biography ==
On 9 March 1958, Doll was born in Vienna. When she was 19, she took up German studies and theatre studies in Vienna. Doll went on to enroll at the Max Reinhardt Seminar to train as an actress. She did not require input dramaturge upon drawing upon world literature individuals. Doll received her first professional theatrial engagement at the Salzburger Landestheater when she was aged 20, and went on to portray roles at Vienna's Volkstheater. She earned the Kainz Medal in 1992 for her performance of Libussa by Franz Grillparzer at the Volkstheater, and the Karl Skraup Prize for her roles in the plays Nora and Hedda Gabler by Henrik Ibsen. Doll played as Martha in Edward Albee's Wer hat Angst vor Virginia Woolf, for which she received one of Austria's most prestigious theatre accolades, the Nestroy Theatre Prize for best actress, in 2000.

She worked extensively in film and television. Doll portrayed the lead role of Marianne opposite Helmut Qualtinger in the 1979 Maximilian Schell adaption of the film Tales from the Vienna Woods. The role earned her the Best Actress Award as part of the Bavarian Film Awards in 1979. Doll went on to be in the film Dantons Tod opposite Götz George in 1981, was Charlotte Salomon in the film Charlotte (1981), and Kathi in the 1984 film Der Zerrissene. In 1986, she played the roles of Andrea Rosner in the film Please, Let the Flowers Live and Susan Galloway in the film Nuclear Conspiracy that same year. 1987 she was the female lead in the British film The Second Victory. Doll was Anna in The Seventh Continent (1988) - Michael Haneke's first feature film -, Anka in Hard to Be a God and Berta Garlan in Frau Berta Garlan (both 1989), Gudrun Lampert in Der große Abgang (1995) and Yvonne Wurlitzer in Freier Fall (1997).

Doll was the lead role as a refugee called Anna in the 1998 film Suzie Washington directed by Florian Flicker. She was Jude de Tutelles in the 1999 production Die Sekretärin des Weihnachtsmanns, Mamma and Bokcls Freundein in the 2000 Austrian films Ternitz, Tennessee and Hold-Up respectively. Doll played the part of Mutter in each of Mein Vater, meine Frau und meine Geliebte (2004), Out of Hand (2005), Frau Gamsjäger in Daniel Käfer – Die Schattenuhr (2006) and Karin Bolz in Tatort: Heile Welt (2007). She had roles in the television programmes Der Gorilla (1991), Ein Fall für zwei, Liebling Kreuzberg (1998), The Old Fox, Der letzte Zeuge (1999), Siska (1999 and 2001), Polizeiruf 110 (2001), Tatort (2004) and Fast Forward (2010). Doll has also earned the Best Actress Award at the Fort Lauderdale International Film Festival and the Best Actress Award at the Karlovy Vary International Film Festival in 1980.

At the 2002 Literatur im März, she partook in a staged reading of Ich raum auf! about women in the intervening years of the Second World War. Doll was a leading role in the jazz opera Fear Death by Water (Fürchte den Tod im Wasser) by composer and jazz musician Franz Koglmann in mid-2003. She was theatre director of the plays Hamlet (2004), Meisterklasse (2005) The Merchant of Venice (2008), A Midsummer Night's Dream (2009), M. Ibrahim and the Flowers of the Koran, Falstaff, and Tales from the Vienna Woods.

== Death ==
Doll suffered a severe stroke and died of complications on 26 October 2015 at age 59.

== Legacy ==
The correspondent of Der Spiegel wrote of Doll: "Birgit Doll had an extraordinary stage presence, which made the Viennese-born one of the most important figures on the Austrian theater scene." Margarete Affenzeller, writing for Der Standard, said the actress "was never the Gretchen or Julia type as an actress. She was always drawn towards a Nora or Medea. She felt more connected to the strong female characters." Die Presse's Barbara Petsch said of her "She was an intellectual, even if she appeared on stage and in films mostly as a woman with a strong soul."
