= Michael Gempart =

Swiss actor (1941–2023)

Michael Gempart (21 April 1941 – 10 March 2023) was a Swiss actor.

== Life ==
Gempart was born in Winterthur in 1934 and, after an apprenticeship as a merchant, studied at the Zurich Drama Academy, where he trained in dance and singing. His first engagements took him to the Schauspielhaus Zurich and the Stadttheater Bern. From 1959 to 1963 he was an ensemble member at the Theater Basel and from 1964 to 1974 at the Munich Residence Theatre. From 1982 he worked freelance, including on stage at the Vienna Burgtheater, the Maxim Gorki Theater, the Volksbühne Berlin and the Theater am Neumarkt and often in front of the camera, for example in Markus Imhoof's film “The Boat Is Full”.

In 2013 he played Lohengrin in Paulus Manker's "Wagnerdämmerung" (English: Wagner's Twilight) in Vienna, a project for Richard Wagner's 200th birthday. Gempart also appeared regularly in films and television.

Michael Gempart died on March 10, 2023 in Munich at the age of 88.

== Selected filmography ==
- The Boat Is Full (1981)
- Tour de Ruhr (1981, TV miniseries)
- Kassettenliebe (1982)
- Chouans! (1988)
