= Parole Chicago =

- Genre: Crime comedy period piece
- Starring: Christoph Waltz; Gottfried Vollmer
- Country of origin: Germany
- Original language: German
- No. of seasons: 1
- No. of episodes: 13

Production
- Running time: 25 minutes

Original release
- Network: ARD
- Release: 24 September – 17 December 1979

Parole Chicago was a German television series directed by Reinhard Schwabenitzky, starring Christoph Waltz as Eduard "Ede" Bredo, an inept wannabe criminal in 1920s Berlin. Its entire run of 13 episodes first aired in 1979. The show was loosely based on Henry Slesar's Ruby Martinson series of short stories, written from 1957 to 1962.

== See also ==
- List of German television series
