= Mozart und Meisel =

- Starring: Götz Kauffmann; Andreas Vitásek
- Country of origin: Austria

Mozart und Meisel is an Austrian television series.

== See also ==
- List of Austrian television series
