= Wespennest =

Austrian literary magazine

- Editors: Andrea Roedig, Andrea Zederbauer
- Categories: Literary magazine
- Frequency: Biannual
- Circulation: 5,000
- Founder: Peter Henisch, Helmut Zenker
- Founded: 1969
- Company: Verein Gruppe Wespennest
- Country: Austria
- Based in: Vienna
- Language: German
- Website: www.wespennest.at
- ISSN: 1012-7313

Wespennest (German for "wasps' nest"), subtitled Zeitschrift für brauchbare Texte und Bilder ('magazine for usable texts and images'), is a literary magazine published in Vienna, Austria. Founded in 1969, it appeared quarterly until 2009 and has been published twice a year since 2010. Each issue presents texts and images by authors and artists on a country, literature, art theory or politics, together with interviews, polemics, book and theatre reviews, and photography.

Wespennest is one of the founding journals of the cultural-journal network Eurozine, and in 2003 it received the V.O. Stomps Prize of the city of Mainz for its small-press publishing.

== History ==
The magazine was founded in 1969 and developed as a project by a group of authors from the Vienna 68er-Bewegung. The twenty-year-old writers Peter Henisch and Helmut Zenker founded Wespennest as a publication for their own texts, set against the literary magazine Literatur und Kritik, which they found "too virtuous", and Manuskripte, which they found "too avant-garde". After the founding authors resigned, other writers including Gustav Ernst and Franz Schuh worked as editors and co-publishers of Wespennest for many years. In the mid-1980s, Josef Haslinger altered the concept of the then quarterly magazine: alongside German-language literature and essays, it began to publish regular translations of foreign authors not well known in the German-speaking world. Wespennest is one of the founding journals of the European network of cultural journals Eurozine.

Walter Famler, who edited the magazine until 2014, expanded its activities at the beginning of the 1990s to include book publishing, issuing three to five books a year in the series Edition Literatur, Edition Essay and Edition Film. Founded as a literary magazine, Wespennest now includes works on the humanities and social sciences. It regularly publishes critical essays on topics of contemporary art and film, and coverage of political and social events in and outside Austria. The 100th issue, which appeared in September 1995, included further content and design changes by Stefan Fuhrer. Articles appear under the heading Wespennest Portraits, which has included articles on Drago Jančar, Dževad Karahasan, John Mateer and Meg Stuart. The articles aim to maintain a connection between photographs and text.

The magazine is published under a distribution agreement with the Munich-based publishing house C.H. Beck. It aims to provide a literary forum and a critical public for authors, who have included Friedrich Achleitner, Gabriela Adameşteanu, Gennadij Ajgi, Sadik Al-Azm, Les Back, Lothar Baier, Colette Braeckman, Alida Bremer, Rudolf Burger, Mircea Cărtărescu, Peter O. Chotjewitz, Inger Christensen, György Dalos, Jesús Díaz, Ulrike Draesner, Michail Eisenberg, Katarina Frostenson, Arno Geiger, Georgi Gospodinov, Sabine Gruber, Adolf Holl, Nora Iuga, Jaan Kaplinski, Sema Kaygusuz, Navid Kermani, Friederike Mayröcker, Suketu Mehta, Dmi-trij Prigow, Elif Şafak, Warlam Schalamow, Robert Schindel, Burghart Schmidt, Olga Sedakova, Heinz Steinert, Ilija Trojanow, Tomas Venclova, Wolf Wondratschek and others. The forum for European literature has had contributions from Spain, the Netherlands, Greece and Scandinavia, and discusses the literature of Eastern Europe.

Until 2009 the magazine appeared quarterly, with four themed issues a year; since 2010 it has published two themed issues a year, alongside occasional special editions, such as those on the jazz composer Franz Koglmann, the poet Friederike Mayröcker and the Art Brut artist Adolf Wölfli.

In 2003 the magazine received the V.O. Stomps Prize of the city of Mainz, for "outstanding achievements in small-scale publishing".

== Editorial board ==
Since 2014 the magazine has been edited by Andrea Roedig and Andrea Zederbauer, together with Florian Baranyi, Thomas Eder (books), Stefan Fuhrer (photography), Jan Koneffke (literature), Reinhard Öhner (photography) and Ilija Trojanow (reportage).

== See also ==
- Austrian literature
- List of literary magazines
