= Bavarian Film Awards (Best Acting) =

The Bavarian Film Awards (German: Bayerischer Filmpreis) have been awarded annually since 1979 by the state government of Bavaria in Germany. They are among the most highly regarded awards for filmmaking achievement in Germany. There are several categories for actors and actresses.

== Table of winners ==
=== Best Actor ===
- 1983 Gustl Bayrhammer, Joachim Bernhard
- 1985 Jürgen Prochnow
- 1988 Uwe Bohm, Klaus Maria Brandauer
- 1989 Ulrich Mühe
- 1990 Manfred Krug
- 1992 Jürgen Vogel, Kai Wiesinger
- 1994 Herbert Knaup, Joachim Król
- 1995 Götz George
- 1996 Heiner Lauterbach
- 1997 Michael Mendl, Kai Wiesinger
- 1998 August Diehl, Ulrich Matthes
- 1999 Uwe Ochsenknecht
- 2000 Benno Fürmann
- 2001 Ulrich Noethen
- 2002 Axel Prahl
- 2003 Christian Ulmen
- 2004 Bruno Ganz
- 2005 Ulrich Mühe
- 2006 Jürgen Vogel
- 2007 Elmar Wepper
- 2008 Ulrich Tukur
- 2009 Mark Waschke
- 2010 Edgar Selge
- 2011 Milan Peschel
- 2012 Tom Schilling
- 2013 Tobias Moretti
- 2014 Alexander Fehling
- 2015 Burghart Klaußner
- 2016 Jörg Schüttauf
- 2017 David Kross and Frederick Lau
- 2018 Alexander Scheer
- 2019 Bjarne Mädel and Lars Eidinger
- 2020 Oliver Masucci
- 2021 Albrecht Schuch
- 2022 Florian David Fitz
- 2023 Stefan Gorski
- 2024 Christoph Maria Herbst
- 2025 Rainer Bock

=== Best Supporting Actor ===
- 1999 Gottfried John

=== Best New Actor ===
- 1988 Werner Stocker
- 1989 Jürgen Vogel
- 1991 Hansa Czypionka
- 1993 André Eisermann
- 1996 Jan Josef Liefers
- 1999 Florian Lukas
- 2000 Tom Schilling, Robert Stadlober
- 2001 Daniel Brühl
- 2002 Barnaby Metschurat
- 2004 Matthias Schweighöfer
- 2005 Max Riemelt
- 2009 Friedrich Mücke
- 2010 Jacob Matschenz, Burak Yiğit
- 2012 Sabin Tambrea
- 2013 Jonas Nay
- 2014 Louis Hofmann
- 2015 Max von der Groeben, Aram Arami, Lucas Reiber
- 2016 Jannis Niewöhner
- 2017 Jonas Dassler
- 2018 Max Hubacher
- 2019 Jan Bülow
- 2020 Farba Dieng, Julius Nitschkoff

=== Best Actress ===
- 1979 Birgit Doll
- 1980 Birgit Doll
- 1981 Eva Mattes
- 1982 Edith Clever
- 1983 Lena Stolze
- 1984 Marita Breuer
- 1985 Christiane Hörbiger
- 1987 Carola Höhn, Marianne Hoppe, Camilla Horn, Ortrud von der Recke, Fee von Reichlin, Marika Rökk, Rose Renée Roth
- 1988 Ayse Romey
- 1989 Claudia Messner
- 1990 Franziska Walser
- 1993 Katja Riemann
- 1994 Meret Becker, Nina Petri, Maria Schrader
- 1995 Katja Riemann
- 1996 Corinna Harfouch
- 1997 Barbara Sukowa
- 1998 Juliane Köhler, Maria Schrader
- 1999 Martina Gedeck
- 2000 Hannelore Elsner
- 2001 Karoline Eichhorn
- 2002 Marie Bäumer
- 2003 Johanna Gastdorf
- 2004 Jessica Schwarz
- 2005 Nina Hoss
- 2006 Monica Bleibtreu, Katharina Thalbach
- 2007 Martina Gedeck
- 2008 Ursula Werner
- 2009 Barbara Sukowa
- 2010 Sophie Rois
- 2011 Bettina Mittendorfer, Steffi Kühnert
- 2012 Barbara Sukowa
- 2013 Brigitte Hobmeier
- 2014 Katharina Marie Schubert
- 2015 Rosalie Thomass
- 2016 Sandra Hüller
- 2017 Diane Kruger
- 2018 Marie Bäumer
- 2019 Anne Ratte-Polle
- 2020 Nilam Farooq
- 2021 Johanna Wokalek
- 2022 Anna Maria Mühe
- 2023 Hannah Herzsprung
- 2024 Jella Haase
- 2025 Leonie Benesch

=== Best Supporting Actress ===
- 1999 Marita Marschall
- 2002 Margit Carstensen
- 2003 Johanna Gastdorf

=== Best New Actress ===
- 1983 Susanne Herlet, Anja Jaenicke
- 1988 Dana Vávrová
- 1989 Anica Dobra
- 1995 Heike Makatsch, Franka Potente
- 1996 Christiane Paul
- 1997 Catherine Flemming
- 2000 Fritzi Haberlandt
- 2001 Chiara Schoras
- 2004 Julia Jentsch
- 2005 Sandra Hüller
- 2006 Hannah Herzsprung
- 2007 Elinor Lüdde, Petra Schmidt-Schaller
- 2008 Karoline Herfurth
- 2009 Katharina Schüttler
- 2010 Paula Beer
- 2011 Jella Haase
- 2012 Lisa Brand
- 2013 Liv Lisa Fries
- 2014 Jasna Fritzi Bauer
- 2015 Jella Haase, Anna Lena Klenke, Gizem Emre
- 2016 Lea van Acken
- 2017 Verena Altenberger
- 2018 Svenja Jung
- 2019 Luna Wedler
- 2020 Lena Urzendowsky
- 2021 Sara Fazilat
- 2023 Bayan Layla
