= Die Alpensaga =

Austrian television series

- Directed by: Dieter Berner
- Music by: Peer Raben
- Country of origin: Austria
- No. of episodes: 6

Production
- Camera setup: Michael Ballhaus, Xaver Schwarzenberger
- Running time: 89 minutes

Original release
- Network: ZDF, ORF
- Release: 7 December 1976 – 1980

Die Alpensaga is a six-part Austrian television drama film by Peter Turrini and Wilhelm Pevny. It was filmed between 1976 and 1980 under the direction of Dieter Berner. A critical portrayal of the social structures in the countryside and the effects of the political crises in the first half of the 20th century in Upper Austria, it follows the Hubers, an Austrian farming family. Peer Raben composed the music for the series. Critically acclaimed, it has been compared by critics to Bertolucci's epic film 1900. A three-volume book edition of the series was published in 1980.

== Episodes ==
Six episodes, written by Peter Turrini and Wilhelm Pevny, were made: Liebe im Dorf (1976), Der Kaiser am Lande (1977), Das große Fest (1977), Die feindlichen Brüder (1978), Der deutsche Frühling (1979), Ende und Anfang (1980).

=== 1. Lieb im Dorf (Love in the Village) ===
Upper Austria 1900. Most of the farmers in the village are doing badly. The big farmer Allinger wants to build a spirit distillery. To do this he needs all the fields to grow potatoes. Huber, a young farmer, and the teacher see another way out of the crisis by founding a breeding cattle cooperative. A trial of strength ensues between the two.

Cast: Hans Brenner (Huberbauer), Helmut Qualtinger (Allinger), Ernst Meister (Allinger's partner), Linde Prelog (Anna Huber), Rudolf Jusits (Peter Allinger), Therese Affolter (Agerl Huber), Götz Kauffmann (landlord), Hilde Berger (waitress Christl), Anni Birk (mother Huber), Otto Tausig (gendarme), Jaromír Borek (teacher).

=== 2. Der Kaiser Im Land (The Emperor in the Countryside) ===
Josef Huber, the older brother of the Huber farmer, is given his first home leave after a long period of service in the army. Astonished, he notices the changes in the village. Allinger's spirit factory is flourishing, Christl, his former bride, is now the landlord's wife. Gradually Josef realises that the uniform gives him prestige and his boastful stories attract more and more attention.

Cast: Franz Buchrieser (Corporal Huber), Bozidarka Frait (Slovakian), Hans Brenner (Huber farmer), Burgi Mattuschka (Huber farmer's wife), Helmut Berger (brother), Linde Prelog (sister), Hilde Berger (landlady Christl), Otto Clemens (farmer)

=== 3. Das große Fest (The Great Feast) ===
The village during the First World War: Most of the men have been drafted into the army, many of them have already fallen, and all the work is done by the women, children and old people. The situation worsens when the population is repeatedly called upon to donate livestock and supplies to the army.

Cast: Burgi Mattuschka (Huber farmer), Wolfram Berger (Deserteur), Linde Prelog (Anna), Barbara Prowaznik (Barbara), Judith Holzmeister (countess), Karl Paryla (count), Hilde Berger (Wirtin Christl).

=== 4. Die feindlichen Brüder (The Hostile Brothers) ===
An Upper Austrian village in 1933: The Christian-social 'Heimwehr' is opposed to the 'red workers'.

Cast: Josef Kröpfl (Gregor Huber), Karl Kröpfl (Michl Huber), Hans Brenner (old Huberbauer), Burgi Mattuschka (his wife), Linde Prelog (his sister), Franz Suhrada (Werkmeister), Lukas Resetarits (Förster).

=== 5. Der deutsche Frühling (The German Spring) ===
In March 1938 the Huber farm is in great financial difficulties. Maria Huber goes to Linz as a maid. There she gets caught up in the Nazi turmoil the night before Hitler invades Austria and sees her brother Michl arrested by the Nazis.

Cast: Elisabeth Stepanek (Maria Huber), Manfred Lukas-Luderer (Hubert), Monica Bleibtreu (Frau Leischner), Toni Böhm (Greißler), Rainer von Artenfels (teacher), Joe Trummer (letter carrier), Miguel Herz-Kestranek (secretary).

=== 6. End and Beginning (Ende und Anfang) ===
In the summer of 1945, Hans, the young Huberbauer, comes home from captivity, a few hours after his mother's funeral. The farm is intact. His old aunt Anna lives on the Huberhof with Maria and quartered soldiers.

Cast: Bernd Spitzer (Hans Huber), Linde Prelog (Anna Huber), Elisabeth Stepanek (Maria Huber), Andrea Altmann (Burgl Huber), Manfred Lukas-Luderer (Hubert), Johannes Thanheiser (Reblaus).

== Reception ==
Die Alpensaga was acclaimed by both the critics and the public, though was criticised by the Austrian Farming Union and the Catholic Church, which prohibited the filming team from filming inside the church. Authors Frank Finlay and Ralf Jeutter state that the series was seen by international critics as "not only a televisual chronicle and obituary of a dying social class, the farming communities which had once been so important, but as an Austrian equivalent of Bertolucci's epic 1900." Gertraud Steiner in her 1995 book Film Book Austria described the television film as an "undisputed masterpiece". The three-volume book edition of Die Alpensaga was published in 1980.

== See also ==
- List of Austrian television series
