= Kurt Weinzierl =

Austrian actor

Kurt Weinzierl (15 April 1931 in Innsbruck, Austria – 10 October 2008 in Munich, Germany) was an Austrian television actor. He played Franz Jägerstätter in the biopic of 1971, but is most famous for his satirical portrayal of the head of the Viennese police forces in Kottan ermittelt.

== Partial filmography ==
- Holiday am Wörthersee (1956) – Sieglindes Bräutigam
- Der Bauer als Millionär (1961) – Habakuk (uncredited)
- Als ich beim Käthele im Wald war (1963) – Vetter Konrad
- The Man in the Rushes (1978) – Schemnitzky
- Der Sturz (1979) – Dr. Freudenreich
- Der Preis fürs Überleben (1980)
- Musik auf dem Lande (1980) – Guido Renner
- Derrick (1980–1996, TV Series) – Direktor / Karl Podewil / Hotelbesitzer / Herr Heuer / Musiklehrer / Robert / Hugo Dornwall
- After Midnight (1981) – Dr. Breslauer
- Kottan ermittelt (1981–1983, TV Series) – Oberst Heribert Pilch
- Zeitgenossen (1982)
- Woman with the Red Hat (1982) – Film producer
- Mit mir nicht, du Knallkopp (1983) – Rufus Schubiak
- Knock on the Wrong Door (1984)
- Mama Mia – Don't Panic (1984) – Schuldirektor
- Tiger: Springtime in Vienna (1984)
- Seitenstechen (1985) – Barber
- Mary Ward (1985) – Pater Keynes
- Forget Mozart (1985) – Arzt
- Die Einsteiger (1985) – Trainer / Sheriff / Archäologe / Louis XIV. / Pianist / Nero
- Geld oder Leber! (1986) – Gefängniswärter
- Please, Let the Flowers Live (1986) – Kommissar in Wien
- Smaragd (1987)
- Ein Schloß am Wörthersee (1990–1993, TV Series) – Oberinspektor Grasshofer
- The Nasty Girl (1990) – Priest (uncredited)
- Kein Pardon (1993) – Bertram
- Das geborgte Nest (1995)
- Das Zauberbuch (1996) – King
- Alle für die Mafia (1998) – Karl Wielander
- Professor Niedlich (2001)
- Echte Wiener – Die Sackbauer-Saga (2008) – Vitus Egger (final film role)
