= Was wäre, wenn...? =

1960 film

- Directed by: Gerhard Klingenberg
- Written by: Gerhard Klingenberg (writer), Klaus Wischnewski (dramatisation), Hedda Zinner
- Cinematography: Erich Gusko
- Edited by: Friedel Welsandt
- Music by: Peter Fischer
- Release date: 1960
- Running time: 1 hr 30 minutes
- Country: East Germany
- Language: German

Was wäre, wenn...? (lit. What If....?) is an East German film. It was released in 1960. A black-and-white film, it is an adaptation from the comedy play of the same name by Hedda Zinner.

== Plot ==
The DEFA wants to shoot several scenes with a film crew in a castle near the West border, but the castle needs to be renovated first because it is in a pretty run-down state. After the production manager has approved a sum of 12,000 DM for this, the director, the cameraman and an architect drive to the small (fictional) village of Willshagen. They pick up the Bürgmeister and drive with him to the castle. Shortly before arriving, the car has a flat tire, so the driver Kratzke changes the tire and then drives back to the village to have the defective one repaired. The three filmmakers walk the rest of the way and Kratzke gets advice from the mayor about who he can turn to.

It is the tractor driver Peter, who is closely connected with Inge, the daughter of the second-rank farmer Gepfert, whose father, however, wants to marry her off to Christian, the son of the first-rank farmer Dahlke. Although Gepfert has already shown his willingness to join the agricultural production cooperative (LPG), Dahlke persuades him to refrain from marrying off the two children and thus profitably expand the adjacent plots of land. When Kratzke meets the farmer Dahlke at the farmer Gepfert's while looking for Peter, the farmer promises to show him the way if he takes him to the village inn. In the back seat he discovers a folder with documents about the castle, which was abandoned by its owners after the end of the war.

At the inn, Dahlke explains the route to the driver and goes inside to tell two like-minded opponents of the LPG what he has just seen. Since the vehicle is a Western car (a Mercedes-Benz) and the actual occupants are on their way to the castle, he suspects that they can only be representatives of the count who want to inspect the condition of the castle, since there has been a lot of talk recently about an exchange of territory along the border.

== Cast ==
- Willi Narloch: Gepfert
- Gerd Ehlers: Dahlke
- Heinz Frölich: Elias Ebermayer
- Hanns Anselm Perten: Schäfer
- Fritz Hofbauer: Biegel
- Angela Brunner: Inge Gepfert
- Manfred Krug: Christian Dahlke
- Manfred Borges: Peter
- Adolf Peter Hoffmann: Mirek
- Ernst Kahler: Kramer
- Peter Marx: LGrollmann
- Heinz Scholz: Mielsche
- Georg Peter-Pilz: Bürgermeister

== Reception ==
The Lexicon of International Films writes that it is a comedy that strives to take a realistic view of the consciousness of the GDR rural population and comes to surprisingly honest, critical conclusions, but is staged in an aesthetically rather unpretentious manner.

The Berliner Zeitung noted: “But what would have to be there in addition for this lesson to have a convincing impact, an accurate picture of the new reality in our villages, which highlights the typical, is completely missing. It is not revealed because the script clings anxiously to the stage template and cannot get away from the narrowness and limitations of the settings – which are theatrical and "appropriate". But the real mistake lies deeper. The film should have been completely redesigned, because it does not demand a play with reality, but reality itself, full reality. This film, however, is not based on reality, but on stereotypes.” The Neuen Zeit lamented that a spectator who would know Hedda Zinner’s play could not like the DEFA film, and went on to state, “Little jokes taken from the set of the oldest cinematographic repertoire, which would be more appropriate for an Upper Bavarian tear-jerker than for a film that wants to make a thought-provoking statement, dominate and obscure the theme. The slapstick becomes an end in themselves, and it is not even original slapstick."
