= Sandra Rieß =

German television presenter and radio host

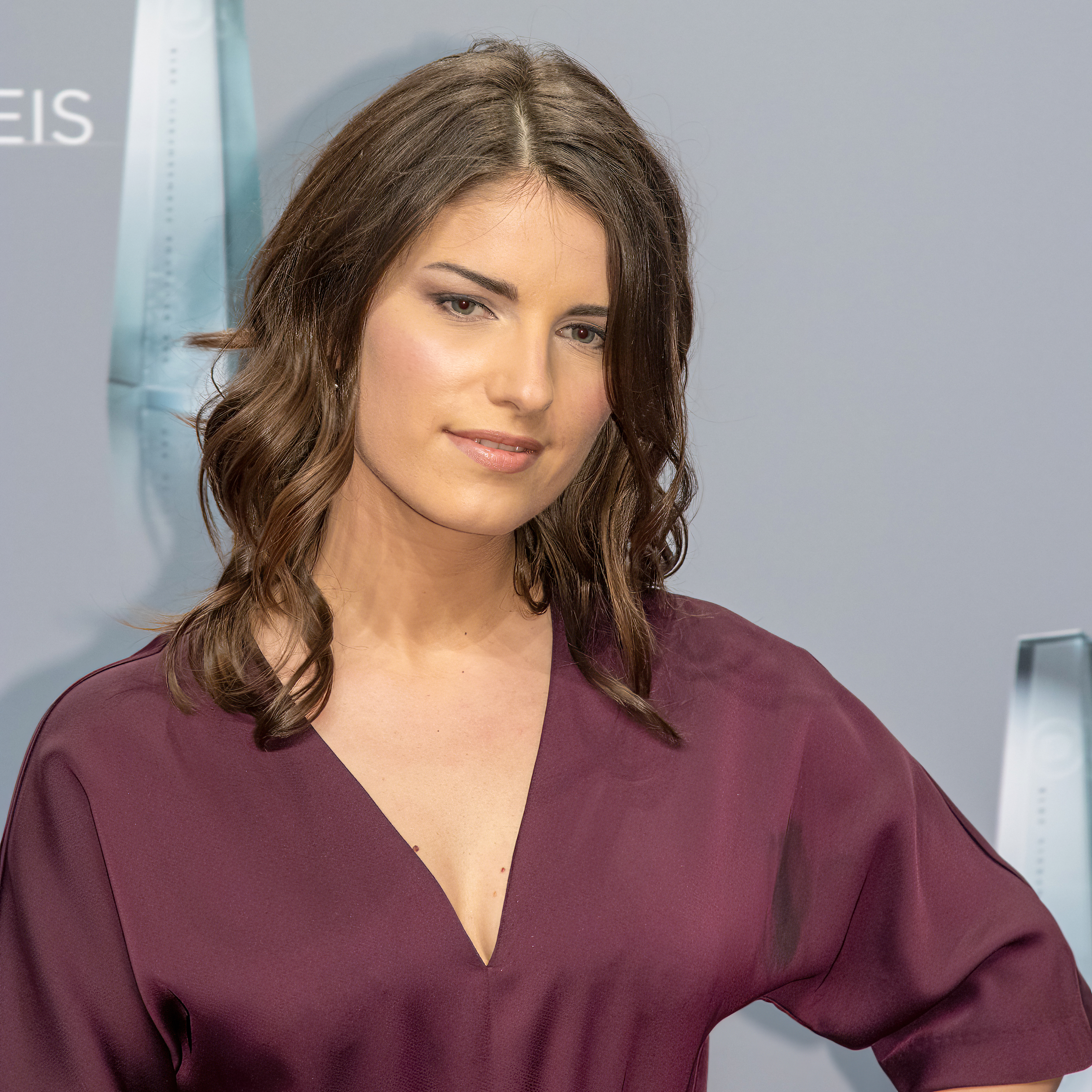
- Rieß in 2018
- Born: 3 March 1986 (age 40); Nuremberg, Germany
- Occupation: Actress
- Years active: 2010–present

Sandra Rieß (born March 3, 1986, in Nuremberg) is a German radio and television presenter. After studying at the University of Bayreuth, Sandra Rieß was cast by Bayerischer Rundfunk in 2010 and became the presenter of the television show On3-südwild. She moderates and hosts various events and television shows.

== Life and career ==
Sandra Rieß was born on 3 March 1986 at Nuremberg, Germany. After studying “Theater and Media” at the University of Bayreuth, Sandra Rieß completed an internship at Franken Fernsehen in Nuremberg. At the beginning of 2010, she beat around 300 competitors in a casting organized by Bayerischer Rundfunk and became the presenter of the television show On3-südwild.

In March 2011 and March 2012, she moderated the Bayerischer Rundfunk's live broadcasts of strong beer tapping at the Nockherberg in Munich and at the beginning of 2012, the preliminary round for the Eurovision Song Contest 2012 together with Steven Gätjen. In July of the same year, Rieß moderated the Bavarian Radio television program Olympia München 72 alongside Tom Meiler on the fortieth anniversary of the 1972 Summer Olympics. In August and September 2012, she moderated the Bayern 3 Dorffest-TV program for Bavarian Radio. Together with Stefan Raab, she moderated the Bundesvision Song Contest in 2012 and 2013. In 2013 she also moderated the final game of the game show Elton gambles - Live.

From April 2013 to November 2014, Rieß moderated the interactive program log in on ZDFinfo alongside Wolf-Christian Ulrich. She presented the Heimatsound series on Bavarian television. Sandra Rieß was a backstage presenter at Wetten, dass..? and interviewed Harrison Ford, Lenny Kravitz, Céline Dion and Sting, among others. For the 2017 federal election, Rieß moderated the format Choose Me! on ZDF, where she confronted young politicians with their dream voters. Since 2019 she has moderated the news programs Rundschau and Rundschau-Magazin on BR television, both programs were renamed BR24 in 2022. In 2021 and 2022, Rieß moderated the BR-produced editions of the business magazine Plusminus on Erste. Since December 2021, she has also been moderating the annual charity show Star Hours Gala on BR television on Bayerischer Rundfunk's Star Hour Day, in which donations are collected for children in need, together with Volker Heißmann. Since April 2023, she has been moderating the Tagesschau news on tagesschau24 as a substitute and speaks the Tagesschau at 9 a.m. during the week as well as regularly speaking the night editions of the Tagesschau.
