= Landestheater Niederösterreich =

Austrian venue

Coordinates: 48.205614°N 15.622262°E

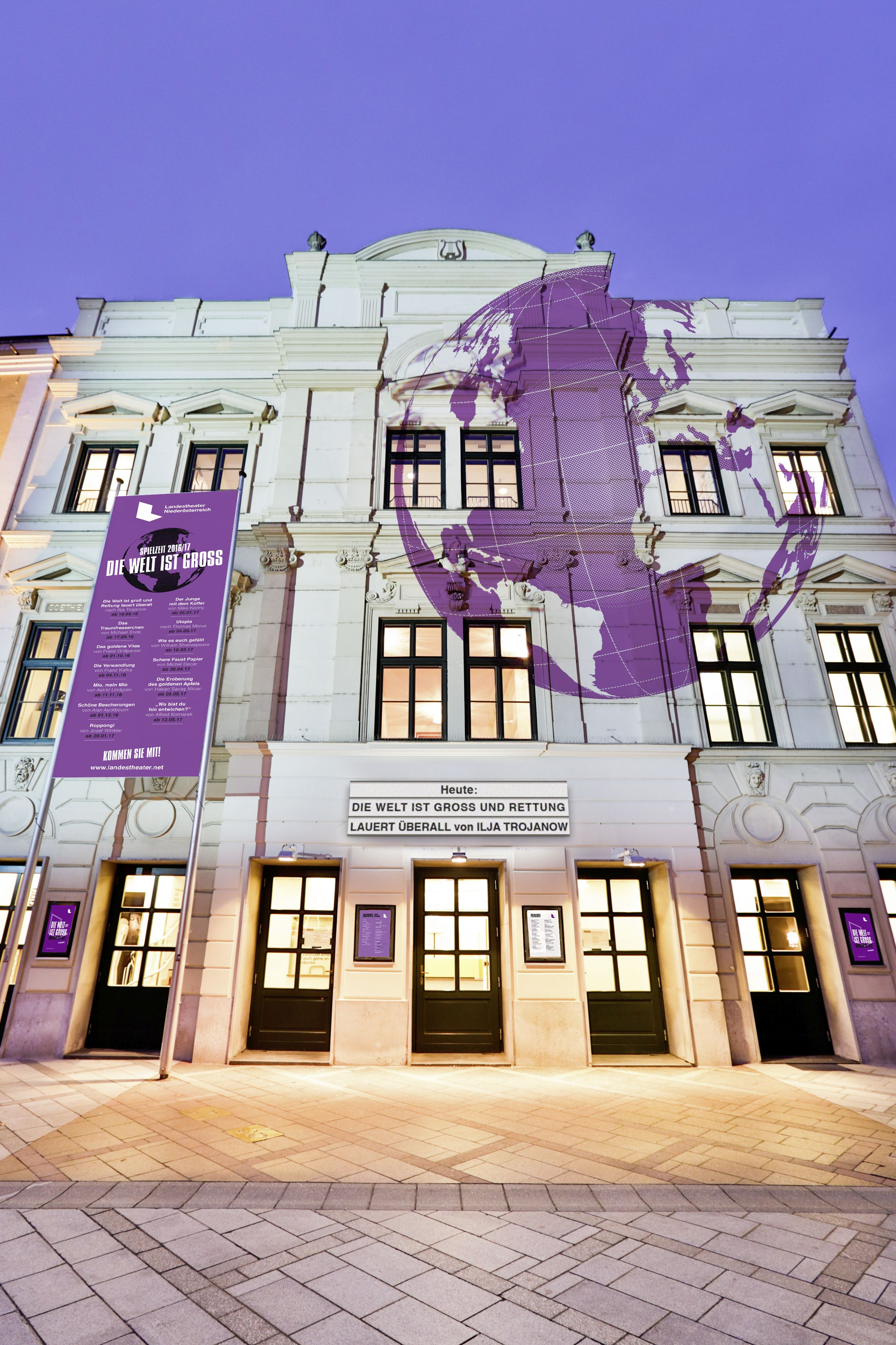
Landestheater Niederösterreich

The Landestheater Niederösterreich is a Schauspielhaus in the Lower Austrian provincial capital St. Pölten.

== History ==
In the autumn of 1820, a military prison converted by master builder Josef Schwerdtfeger on today's Rathausplatz was opened as the first permanent theatre in St. Pölten, which also served as a ballroom. The first tenant was the theatre entrepreneur Leopold Hoch, who was followed by others. The theatre is mentioned in a guidebook from the Biedermeier period, the work Wien's Umgebungen auf zwanzig Stunden im Umkreise by Adolf Schmidl from 1835:

The newly built theatre is large enough for the city, may not be unfriendly with its half dozen boxes and its gallery, if it were better illuminated.

After a closure for financial reasons in the 1847/1848 season, the theatre was sold to the city and thus became a municipal theatre. After the Ringtheater fire in 1881, the house was closed as a theatre due to lack of fire safety and from then on was only used as a ballroom. In 1893, the building was completely rebuilt according to plans by Heinrich Wohlmeyer; only the outer walls of the old theatre remained. When the theatre reopened, it had an enlarged stage, an enlarged orchestra room and a total of 500 seats.

In the 1927/28 season, the theatre remained closed and was subsequently merged with the theatres in Baden, Krems and Bruck an der Leitha to form the Städtebundtheater. After its closure in 1931, it was reopened in 1933, but from 1935 to 1938 it was only a Bespieltheater. During the Second World War, the building was used as SS quarters and storage space and was eventually damaged by bombs, with the roof being destroyed. In 1948, the theatre was able to reopen and resumed acting and musical theatre operations, but in the early days it still had no roof and was thus involuntarily open-air theatre.

Between 1966 and 1969, the theatre was again extensively rebuilt and extended according to plans by Paul Pfaffenbichler, which reduced the capacity of the auditorium to 411 seats. However, with the theatre on the rehearsal stage (from 1975 "Studio der Zeit"), the theatre had a second venue until its closure in 1986. In 1996, the theatre was renovated and in 2002 a second venue with 120 seats was added with the Theatre Workshop.

From the 1990s the stage was called Theatre of the Provincial Capital St. Pölten - Theatre for Lower Austria. The theatre in its present form has existed since the 2005/06 season. Since then, the theatre, which has now been taken over by the province, has been called Landestheater Niederösterreich, which, as a single-sector theatre, defines itself only by its spoken theatre. The foyer of the main theatre and the theatre café were redesigned in summer 2012 as modern components in the historical ambience of the theatre building.

== Honours ==
- 2011 Isabella Suppanz nominated for the Special Prize of the Award of the Nestroy Theatre Prize 2011 as the Intendant responsible for the upswing of the Landestheater Niederösterreich.
- 2012 Brigitta Furgler as Frau Vockerat in Einsame Menschen by Gerhart Hauptmann nominated for the Award of the Nestroy Theatre Prize 2012 in the category best supporting role.
- 2012 Lonely People by Gerhart Hauptmann, directed by Janusz Kica nominated for the Nestroy Theatre Award 2012 in the category "best provincial performance".
- 2013 Franziska Hackl as Medea in Mamma Medea by Tom Lanoye nominated for the Award of the Nestroy Theatre Prize 2013 in the category "best actress".
- 2013 Mamma Medea by Tom Lanoye, directed by Philipp Hauß nominated for the Nestroy Theatre Award 2013 in the category "best provincial performance".
- 2013 Christine Jirku, ensemble member of the Landestheater Niederösterreich, nominated for the Nestroy Theatre Prize 2013 in the category "Nestroy-ORF III Audience Award".
- 2014 Meine Mutter, Kleopatra by Attila Bartis, directed by Robert Alföldi nominated for the Verleihung des Nestroy-Theaterpreises 2014 in the category "best provincial performance".
- 2014 Woe to him who lies! by Franz Grillparzer, directed by Alexander Charim nominated for the Nestroy Theatre Prize 2014 in the category "best performance in the Federal Province".
- 2014 Swintha Gersthofer as Edrita in Woe to him who lies! by Franz Grillparzer nominated for the Nestroy Theatre Prize 2014 in the category "best newcomer".
- 2015 Special Prize at the Award of the Nestroy Theatre Prize 2015 for Glanzstoff by Felix Mitterer at the Glanzstoff Austria, Bürgertheater of the Landestheater Niederösterreich.
- 2016 Nestroy Theatre Award 2016 - Best Bundesländer Performance for Lichter der Vorstadt, staged by Alexander Charim
- 2019 Nestroy Theatre Award - in the category Best Newcomer for Moritz Beichl with his production of "Der Tag, an dem mein Großvater ein Held war" by Paulus Hochgatterer.
- 2019 Stella Award (STELLA-Performing.Arts.Award for Young Audiences) - in the category "outstanding music" for Jelena Popržan in "The Language of Water" by Sarah Crossan (production: Sara Ostertag).
- 2020 Nestroy Theatre Prize 2020 - in the category Best Newcomer for Mathias Spaan with his dramatisation and staging of "The Nibelungs".
- 2020 Nestroy Theatre Prize 2020 - in the category Best Federal State Performance for Rikki Henry with his production of "Hamlet" by William Shakespeare

== Directors ==
(from 1975)

- 1975–1991: Herwig Lenau, Intendant (1969-1972 already head of the theatre and vice-director)
- 1991-2002: Peter Wolsdorff, artistic director
- 2002-2005: Reinhard Hauser, artistic director
- 2005-2012: Isabella Suppanz, artistic director
- 2012-2016: Bettina Hering, artistic director
- Since 2016/17: Marie Rötzer, artistic director
