= 1987 in Dutch television =

This is a list of Dutch television related events from 1987.

== Events ==
- 25 March – Marcha is selected to represent the Netherlands at the Eurovision Song Contest 1987 with her song "Rechtop in de wind" at the Nationaal Songfestival held at the Koninklijk Conservatorium in The Hague.
- 9 May – Ireland wins the Eurovision Song Contest with the song Hold Me Now" by Johnny Logan. The Netherlands finish in fifth place with the song "Rechtop in de wind" by Marcha.
- Unknown – Peter Douglas, performing as Frank Sinatra wins the third series of Soundmixshow, becoming the first man to have won.

== Television shows ==
=== 1950s ===
- NOS Journaal (1956–present)

=== 1970s ===
- Sesamstraat (1976–present)

=== 1980s ===
- Jeugdjournaal (1981–present)
- Soundmixshow (1985-2002)
