= 1991 in Dutch television =

This is a list of Dutch television related events from 1991.

== Events ==
- Unknown - The seventh series of Soundmixshow is won by Jorge Castro, performing as Luciano Pavarotti.

== Television shows ==
=== 1950s ===
- NOS Journaal (1956–present)

=== 1970s ===
- Sesamstraat (1976–present)

=== 1980s ===
- Jeugdjournaal (1981–present)
- Soundmixshow (1985-2002)
- Het Klokhuis (1988–present)

=== 1990s ===
- Goede tijden, slechte tijden (1990–present)
