= 1990 in Dutch television =

This is a list of Dutch television related events from 1990.

== Events ==
- 10 March – Maywood are selected to represent Netherlands at the 1990 Eurovision Song Contest with their song "Ik wil alles met je delen". They are selected to be the thirty-fourth Dutch Eurovision entry during Nationaal Songfestival held at Congresgebouw in The Hague.
- 5 May – Italy wins the Eurovision Song Contest with the song "Insieme: 1992" by Toto Cutugno. The Netherlands finish in fifteenth place with their song ""Ik wil alles met je delen" by Maywood.
- 17 September – RTL Veronique is renamed RTL 4.
- Unknown – Marco Borsato wins the sixth series of Soundmixshow, performing as Billy Vera. This was the first series to be broadcast on RTL 4.

== Debuts ==
=== Domestic ===
- 1 October – Goede tijden, slechte tijden (1990–present)

=== International ===
- 27 May – (Wales) Fireman Sam (VARA)

== Television shows ==
=== 1950s ===
- NOS Journaal (1956–present)

=== 1970s ===
- Sesamstraat (1976–present)

=== 1980s ===
- Jeugdjournaal (1981–present)
- Soundmixshow (1985-2002)
- Het Klokhuis (1988–present)

== Conversions and rebrandings ==
Old network name	New network name	Type	Conversion Date	Notes	Source
Nederland 2	TV2	Cable and satellite	Unknown		

== Births ==
- 10 September – Liza Sips, actress, voice actress & TV presenter
