= Die Montagsfamilie =

- Starring: Ingeborg Schöner; Gert Haucke
- Country of origin: Germany

Die Montagsfamilie is a German television series.

== See also ==
- List of German television series
