= Der Leihopa =

Austrian television series

- Directed by: Otto Anton Eder
- Country of origin: Austria; West German

Original release
- Network: ORF; ARD
- Release: 9 September 1985

Der Leihopa was an Austrian television series by the Austrian Broadcasting Corporation, which was broadcast from 1985 to 1989 as a family series. Starting in January 1986, it was broadcast by Bavarian television.

== History ==
The show's first episode aired on September 9, 1985. There were twenty-six episodes that aired from 1985 to 1989, spanning over four seasons.

== Cast ==
Actor	Role
Hans Holt	Franz
Alfred Böhm	Waldermar Herzog
Claudia Martini	Head of Agency
Louis Strasser	Postman
Sabahudin Zijadic	Udo
Kurt Beck	Novak the Servant
Franz Suhrada	Postman
Dieter Moor	Peter
Felicitas Glory	Fili Lindinger
Harold Harth	Father
Marianne Gerzner	Mrs. Wawara

== See also ==
- List of Austrian television series
