= Weekend with Velez =

Philippine television news magazine show

- Genre: News magazine
- Presented by: Jose Mari Velez
- Country of origin: Philippines
- Original language: English

Production
- Running time: 60 minutes
- Production company: GMA News and Public Affairs

Original release
- Network: GMA Radio-Television Arts
- Release: 1986 – 1987

Weekend with Velez is a Philippine television news magazine show broadcast by GMA Radio-Television Arts. Hosted by Jose Mari Velez, it premiered in 1986. The show concluded in 1987.
