= 1986 in Norwegian television =

This is a list of Norwegian television related events from 1986.

== Events ==
- 15 April – British children's television series Thomas the Tank Engine & Friends premieres on Norwegian television on NRK making Norway the very first country outside its homeland to translate the series into a different language.
- 3 May – The 31st Eurovision Song Contest is held at the Grieghallen in Bergen. Belgium wins the contest with the song "J'aime la vie", performed by 13-year-old Sandra Kim.

== Debuts ==
=== International ===
- 15 April – (United Kingdom) Thomas the Tank Engine & Friends (NRK)

== See also ==
- 1986 in Norway
