= 1989 in Dutch television =

This is a list of Dutch television related events from 1989.

== Events ==
- 10 March – Justine Pelmelay is selected to represent Netherlands at the 1989 Eurovision Song Contest with her song "Blijf zoals je bent". She is selected to be the thirty-third Dutch Eurovision entry during Nationaal Songfestival held at RAI Congresgebouw in Amsterdam.
- 6 May – Yugoslavia wins the Eurovision Song Contest with the song "Rock Me" by Riva. The Netherlands finish in fifteenth place with the song "Blijf zoals je bent" by Justine Pelmelay.
- 2 October – RTL Veronique launches as the first private television station in the Netherlands, using a Luxembourgish license.
- Unknown – Carina Bos, performing as Timi Yuro wins the fifth series of Soundmixshow. This was the last series to be broadcast on KRO.

== Debuts ==
=== International ===
- 6 October – (United Kingdom) Count Duckula
- 24 December – (Japan) / (Netherlands) Alfred J. Kwak (VARA)

== Television shows ==
=== 1950s ===
- NOS Journaal (1956–present)

=== 1970s ===
- Sesamstraat (1976–present)

=== 1980s ===
- Jeugdjournaal (1981–present)
- Soundmixshow (1985-2002)
- Het Klokhuis (1988–present)

== Networks and services ==
=== Launches ===
Network	Type	Launch date	Notes	Source
Eurosport 1	Cable television	5 February		
RTV Rijnmond	Cable television	Unknown		
RTL Véronique	Cable television	2 October		

== Births ==
- 9 April – Monique Smit, singer and television presenter
- 12 May – Renze Klamer, radio and television presenter

== Deaths ==
Date	Name	Age	Cinematic Credibility
21 June	Simon van Collem	70	Dutch film journalist
