= 1988 in Dutch television =

This is a list of Dutch television related events from 1988.

== Events ==
- 29 January – Jos Van den Brom, performing as John Denver, wins the fourth series of Soundmixshow.
- 23 March – Gerard Joling is selected to represent the Netherlands at the Eurovision Song Contest 1988 with his song "Shangri-La" at the Nationaal Songfestival held at the Congresgebouw in The Hague.
- 30 April – Switzerland wins the Eurovision Song Contest with the song "Ne partez pas sans moi" by Celine Dion. The Netherlands finish in ninth place with the song "Shangri-La" by Gerard Joling.

== Debuts ==
=== Domestic ===
- 3 January - Het Klokhuis (1988–present)

=== International ===
- 16 April – (United States) DuckTales

== Television shows ==
=== 1950s ===
- NOS Journaal (1956–present)

=== 1970s ===
- Sesamstraat (1976–present)

=== 1980s ===
- Jeugdjournaal (1981–present)
- Soundmixshow (1985-2002)

== Networks and services ==
=== Launches ===
Network	Type	Launch date	Notes	Source
Kindernet	Cable television	1 March		
MTV	Cable television	1 August		

== Births ==
- 2 January – Tess Milne, TV presenter
