= Tour de Ruhr =

- Created by: Elke Heidenreich
- Directed by: Reinhard Schwabenitzky
- Starring: Marie-Luise Marjan; Henry van Lyck; Ralf Richter; Michael Gempart
- Country of origin: West Germany

Tour de Ruhr is a 1981 West German television miniseries with six episodes.

== See also ==
- List of German television series
