= 1985 in Dutch television =

This is a list of Dutch television related events from 1985.

== Events ==
- 17 November – Debut of Soundmixshow, a series hosted by Henny Huisman in which members of the public impersonate their favourite singers.
- November–December – The first series of Soundmixshow was won by Glenda Peters performing as Randy Crawford.

== Debuts ==
- 17 November – Soundmixshow (1985–2002)

== Television shows ==
=== 1950s ===
- NOS Journaal (1956–present)

=== 1970s ===
- Sesamstraat (1976–present)

=== 1980s ===
- Jeugdjournaal (1981–present)

== Networks and services ==
=== Launches ===
Network	Type	Launch date	Notes	Source
Filmnet	Cable television	29 March		
CNN International	Cable television	1 September		

== Births ==
- 19 March – Yolanthe Sneijder-Cabau, Spanish-born actress & TV host
- 8 May – Nikkie Plessen, actress, TV presenter & model
- 31 December – Jan Smit, singer & TV host
