= Büro, Büro =

- Created by: Reinhard Schwabenitzky; Hermann Ebeling
- Starring: Joachim Wichmann
- Country of origin: West Germany (1982-1990); Germany (1990-1991)
- No. of seasons: 3
- No. of episodes: 85

Production
- Running time: 25 minutes

Original release
- Network: ARD
- Release: 1982 – 1993

Büro, Büro ("Office, Office") is a German comedy television series.

== Plot summary ==
The series' plot revolves around the everyday life at Lurzer KG, a small firm producing gym equipment. It deals with both the personal relationships among the staff (including romance, friendships, and feuds) and the highs and lows of running a business. The latter topic includes rationalisation, incorporation (and later exclusion) into an American holding company, and having to move the office several times.

Running gags in the show include the constant personal absence of the company's manager, Mr. Lurzer, and that the attempts of his subordinate executives - especially personnel manager Dr. Herbert Brokstedt (Joachim Wichmann), and his successor Dr. Adalbert-Wilhelm Schmitt-Lausitz (Ralf Wolter) - to motivate the rest of the staff tend to produce anything but the desired effect.

The title sequence is known for its use of the melody "The Typewriter" by Leroy Anderson, which featured in the Jerry Lewis film Who's Minding the Store?.

== See also ==
- List of German television series
