= Tales from the Vienna Woods (1979 film) =

1979 film

- Film poster
- Directed by: Maximilian Schell
- Written by: Christopher Hampton; Ödön von Horvath (play); Maximilian Schell
- Starring: Birgit Doll
- Cinematography: Klaus König
- Production companies: Arabella Film; Bayerischer Rundfunk; Franz Seitz Filmproduktion; MFG-Film; Solaris Film
- Distributed by: Constantin Film
- Release date: October 1979
- Running time: 90 minutes
- Countries: Austria; West Germany
- Language: German

Tales from the Vienna Woods (German: Geschichten aus dem Wienerwald) is a 1979 Austrian-German drama film directed by Maximilian Schell. The film was adapted from the play by Ödön von Horvath. It was selected as the Austrian entry for the Best Foreign Language Film at the 52nd Academy Awards, but was not accepted as a nominee. It was the final film for veteran actress Lil Dagover who started her film career in the 1910s.

== Plot ==
In Vienna, in 1930, a young woman falls in love with a gambler and leaves her fiancé, a common butcher. They become a couple and have a baby, but he eventually gets bored and leaves them. Without means to support herself, her downfall begins.

== Cast ==
- Birgit Doll as Marianne
- Hanno Pöschl as Alfred
- Helmut Qualtinger as Zauberkönig
- Jane Tilden as Valerie
- Adrienne Gessner as Alfred's Grandmother
- Götz Kauffmann as Oskar
- André Heller as Hierlinger
- Norbert Schiller as Rittmeister
- Eric Pohlmann as Mister
- Robert Meyer as Erich
- Lil Dagover as Helene
- Martha Wallner as Alfred's Mother

== See also ==
- List of submissions to the 52nd Academy Awards for Best Foreign Language Film
- List of Austrian submissions for the Academy Award for Best Foreign Language Film
