= Tohuwabohu (TV series) =

- Country of origin: Austria

Tohuwabohu was an Austrian television cabaret and variety series 1990 to 1998 that was aired by the Austrian broadcaster ORF created by Helmut Zenker.The show had eight seasons and had 58 episodes in total.

== See also ==
- List of Austrian television series
