= Kottan ermittelt =

- Genre: crime/satire/comedy
- Created by: Helmut Zenker; Peter Patzak
- Starring: Peter Vogel (1976/77); Franz Buchrieser (1978/79); Lukas Resetarits (1980–1983); Bibiana Zeller; Walter Davy; Curth Anatol Tichy; Kurt Weinzierl; Gusti Wolf
- Country of origin: Austria
- Original language: German
- No. of episodes: 19

Production
- Running time: 90/60 minutes

Original release
- Network: ORF/ZDF
- Release: 8 August 1976 – 6 December 1984

Kottan ermittelt is an Austrian television series that was aired by Austrian television ORF between 1976 and 1984. The satirical 19-episode series about a policeman from Vienna now sports cult status. Police major Adolf Kottan was played by three actors (Peter Vogel, Franz Buchrieser, Lukas Resetarits) who each gave the character a distinct 'flavor'.

== Plot ==
The series centers on police major Adolf Kottan, who works for the homicide department of Vienna police. His closest collaborators are the one-legged, phlegmatic Schremser (Walter Davy), who later becomes department chief, and the extremely stupid and incompetent Schrammel (C. A. Tichy), who is responsible for many of the more exhilarating moments of the series. Kottan is married to Ilse (Bibiana Zeller), and they have two children, daughter Sissi (Birgit Machalissa) – who disappears without explanation and is not mentioned in the later episodes – and son Walter (Florian Böhm).

Later on, Kottan's mother (Gusti Wolf), a passionate amateur detective, moves in with them, building an ever-deepening alliance with her daughter-in-law. Kottan's marriage is constantly threatened in the later episodes by his acquaintance with prostitute Elvira Markl (Christiane Rücker/Eva Kerbler), who Ilse Kottan is extremely jealous of.

In the professional world, Kottan's nemesis is his crazy boss Pilch – he is first the department chief (Harald von Koeppele), who has a phobic fear of flies; after psychiatric treatment, he is promoted chief of the police (Kurt Weinzierl). Pilch is a pathological egomaniac who develops a terrible hatred for a coffee machine Kottan has set up, as well as for Kottan himself.

== List of episodes ==
1: Hartlgasse 16a (8 August 1976)

2: Der Geburtstag (5 June 1977)

3: Wien Mitte (19 April 1978)

4: Nachttankstelle (16 November 1978)

5: Drohbriefe (27 September 1979)

6: Räuber und Gendarm (31 October 1980)

7: Die Beförderung (25 October 1981)

8: So long Kottan (5 November 1982)

9: Die Einteilung (19 November 1982)

10: Kansas City (3 December 1982)

11: Die Entführung (17 December 1982)

12: Hausbesuche (7 January 1983)

13: Fühlt wie Du (21 January 1983)

14: Genie und Zufall (8 April 1984)

15: Die Enten des Präsidenten (29 April 1984)

16: Smokey und Baby und Bär (26 August 1984)

17: Mein Hobby: Mord (18 October 1984)

18: Der Kaiser schickt Soldaten aus (15 November 1984)

19: Mabuse kehrt zurück (6 December 1984)

== History ==
Writer Helmut Zenker first created the character of police major Kottan in 1974. He first featured on a radio drama before becoming the main character of the TV movie Hartlgasse 16a, now considered to be the first episode of the series. Because the film with Peter Vogel in the main role was a success, Austrian television ORF started a full TV series. As Vogel was unavailable for episode 3, the role was recast with playwright and actor Franz Buchrieser. Wary of his newly found popularity, Buchrieser left the show after only three episodes. The role of Kottan was then recast with comedian Lukas Resetarits, a considerably younger actor than either Vogel or Buchrieser – and 20 years younger than his on-screen wife, Bibiana Zeller!

The first seven episodes were feature-length (90 min.). When the German television channel ZDF started co-producing (1980), the length of the episodes was shortened to 60 minutes.

All in all, 19 episodes were shot until 1983. Another six (of what was planned by Zenker and Patzak to be the last season) had been already fully scripted and cast, when then-ORF-boss Gerd Bacher cut short the life of Kottan ermittelt. Episodes 20 till 25 were never made into film, though they were adapted as an audio drama in 2009 with some members of the original cast.

== Characteristics ==
The tone and character of Kottan ermittelt changed considerably during its production. While the first episode can be duly considered a realistic social drama, the series soon became more humorous and satirical, with veering into the frankly absurd in the last few episodes (especially from episode 13).

Zenker and Patzak constantly played with expectations of TV viewers, showing the illusional character of TV (characters break the fourth wall, watch earlier episodes of the series, disappear without further notice or change their appearance, name, family situation from one episode to another etc.).

There are a number of running gags, like the policemen responding Inspektor gibt's kan! (There's no such thing as an inspector), when being called "inspector" by other characters; bikers or cars crashing against the doors of Kottan's car when they are opened; a TV speaker (played by real-life TV speaker Chris Lohner) interacting with the viewers or commenting on them; the coffee machine that refuses to sell coffee to police chief Pilch etc.

In the 1982 episode Kansas City, the first one aired in Germany, a news ticker in the first third of the film announced that an unknown flying object has landed in the German city of Duisburg, home of Horst Schimanski, and there will be a reportage afterwards. It was not immediately clear to the audience that the directors Patzak and Zenker made a joke in the style of Orson Welles's The War of the Worlds. The following news emission did not mention anything about this object, causing viewers to call the ZDF TV station, and finally leading to an apology by producing Austrian TV station ORF.

== Music ==
While the tone of the first two episodes with Peter Vogel is set by the melancholy songs of Austrian singer-songwriter Georg Danzer, the music of the rest of the show consists of vintage pop songs of the 1950s and 60's. Later on, many of these are sung onscreen (always in playback) by several characters, especially Adolf and Ilse Kottan. In the episodes of the 1980s, Kottan is the leader of a band called Kottan's Kapelle, while Ilse and mother Kottan as well as police chief Pilch also strive for musical fame. The songs often ironically comment on the plot and the characters.

== See also ==
- List of Austrian television series
