= Oben ohne (TV series) =

- Country of origin: Austria

Oben ohne ("topless") is an Austrian television series. It is about two families of tenants seeking to avoid eviction from their flats.

== See also ==
- List of Austrian television series
