= Kaisermühlen Blues =

- Country of origin: Austria

Kaisermühlen Blues is an Austrian television series.

== See also ==
- List of Austrian television series
