= Simonischek =

Simonischek is a German language surname of Slavic origin. Notable people with the name include:

- Max Simonischek (1982), Austrian–Swiss actor
- Peter Simonischek (1946–2023), Austrian actor
