= Tscherne =

Tscherne may refer to:

- Franz Tscherne
- Tscherne classification
