= Adolf von Sonnenthal =

Austrian actor

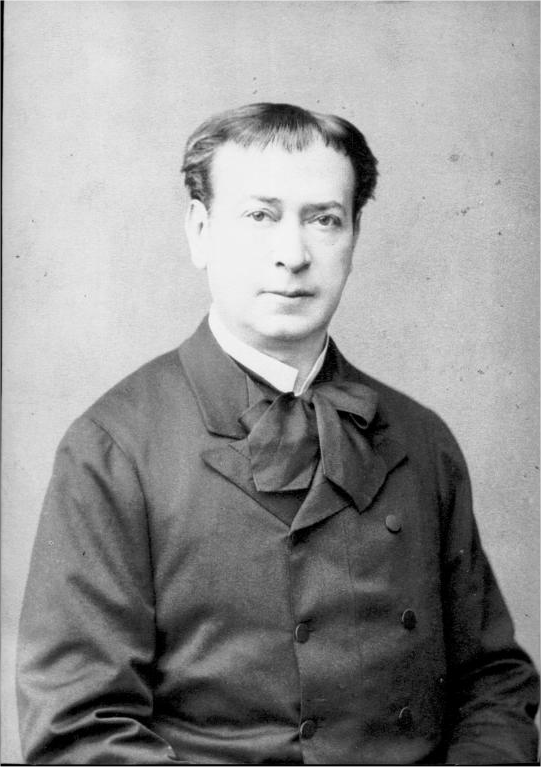
Sonnenthal, 1884

Adolf von Sonnenthal (21 December 1834 – 4 April 1909), Austrian actor, was born of Jewish parentage in Budapest.

Though brought up in penury and apprenticed to a working tailor, he cultivated his talent for drama, and was fortunate in receiving the support of a co-religionist, the actor Bogumil Dawison, who trained him for the stage. He made his first appearance at Temesvar in 1851, and after engagements at Hermannstadt and Graz came in the winter of 1855/1856 to Königsberg in Prussia. His first performance was so successful that he was engaged by Heinrich Laube for the Burgtheater in Vienna, making his first appearance as Mortimer in Schiller's Maria Stuart.

Under Laube's careful tuition he developed within three years into an actor of the first order, excelling both in tragedy and comedy; and in 1882, after twenty-five years of brilliant service at the Court Theatre, he was given a patent of nobility. In 1884 he became manager-in-chief of the theatre; and in 1887–1888 acted as artistic advisor. He visited the United States in 1885, and again in 1899 and 1902, achieving great success.

His chief parts were Nathan in Lessing's Nathan der Weise, Schiller's Wallenstein, and Der Meister von Palmyra (Adolf Wilbrandt).

Sonnenthal's granddaughter married the opera and film composer Erich Wolfgang Korngold.
