= Axel Corti =

Austrian film director (1933–1993)

- Born: Axel Fuhrmanns; 7 May 1933; Paris, France
- Died: 29 December 1993 (aged 60); Oberndorf bei Salzburg, Austria
- Resting place: Arnsdorf cemetery, Lamprechtshausen
- Occupations: Film director, screenwriter
- Years active: 1963-1994

Axel Corti (born Axel Fuhrmanns; 7 May 1933 – 29 December 1993) was an Austrian screenwriter, film director and radio host.

== Life ==
He was born in Paris. His father was a businessman of Austrian and Italian descent, his mother was from Berlin. From German-occupied France, he and his mother were brought to safety in Switzerland by his father, a member of the Resistance who died in 1945. After World War II, he moved to Italy, where he took on the surname Corti, and finally began to study German and Romance philology at the University of Innsbruck.

Corti worked at public Radio Innsbruck from 1953 onwards, from 1956 to 1960 as head of the literature and radio drama department of the Tyrolean ORF regional radio. He then turned to a career as an assistant director at the Vienna Burgtheater and worked as a director at Theater Oberhausen and Theater Ulm as well as with Peter Brook in London. Called up to return to public broadcasting upon a major restructuring of the ORF radio programmes, he made Austrian radio history with the conception of his weekly Der Schalldämpfer broadcasts, which he presented as radio host for more than 24 years from 1969 until 1993. Initially aired by the ORF Ö3 entertainment radio station, Corti's commentaries in a feuilleton style and his sounding voice stood out in a mainly light music programme. The last Schalldämpfer was broadcast three days before his death, featuring the life and work of Rabbi Hillel the Elder.

In 1969, Corti worked as an actor in an ORF television play directed by Wolfgang Glück. The next year he adapted Milhaud's/Cocteau's Le pauvre matelot (The Poor Sailor) and Angelique by Jacques Ibert (starring Mimi Coertse) for an enactment by the Vienna State Opera ensemble at Hofburg Palace, conducted by Hans Swarowsky. Corti also worked as a film director and was appointed a professor at the Filmacademy Vienna in 1972. His 1975 film The Condemned was entered into the 9th Moscow International Film Festival.

Corti married in 1964 and was the father of three sons and one daughter. He died of leukaemia in Oberndorf, Salzburg and is buried in the Arnsdorf cemetery of nearby Lamprechtshausen.

== Awards ==
- Silver Shell for Best Director, 1986 San Sebastián International Film Festival
- Best Director, 1986 Goldene Kamera
- Grimme-Preis, posthumously 1994

Since 1997, an annual Axel-Corti-Preis for outstanding TV productions has been awarded by several Austrian adult education associations.

== Filmography ==
- The Marquis of Keith, 1962, play by Frank Wedekind
- Kaiser Joseph und die Bahnwärterstochter, 1963, drama adaptation starring Hans Moser and Hans Holt
- Der Fall Jägerstätter, 1972, biography of the conscientious objector Franz Jägerstätter
- Ein junger Mann aus dem Innviertel, 1973, biographical sketches on Adolf Hitler
- The Condemned (Totstellen), 1975
- Jakob der Letzte, 1975, adaptation of a Peter Rosegger novel
- Tatort (TV series) – Wohnheim Westendstraße, 1976
- Young Dr. Freud, 1976, film about Sigmund Freud
- Die beiden Freundinnen und ihr Giftmord, 1978, adaptation of an Alfred Döblin novella
- Das eine Glück und das andere, 1980
- Wie der Mond über Feuer und Blut, 1981, ORF television play on Maria Theresa's first year in power
- Where to and Back 1: God Does Not Believe in Us Anymore, 1982
- Herrenjahre, 1983, film adaptation
- Eine blassblaue Frauenschrift (Pale Blue Ink in a Lady's Hand), 1984, ORF/RAI co-production starring Gabriel Barylli and Otto Schenk, adaptation of the novel by Franz Werfel
- Where to and Back 2: Santa Fe, 1986
- Where to and Back 3: Welcome in Vienna, 1986, Austrian submission for the Academy Award for Best Foreign Language Film in 1987
- The King's Whore, 1990, starring Timothy Dalton
- Radetzkymarsch, 1994, TV miniseries, based on Joseph Roth's Radetzky March novel, starring Max von Sydow, Charlotte Rampling, Karlheinz Hackl, Fritz Muliar, and Franz Tscherne, directing completed by Gernot Roll.
