= Bogumil Dawison =

German actor (1818–1872)

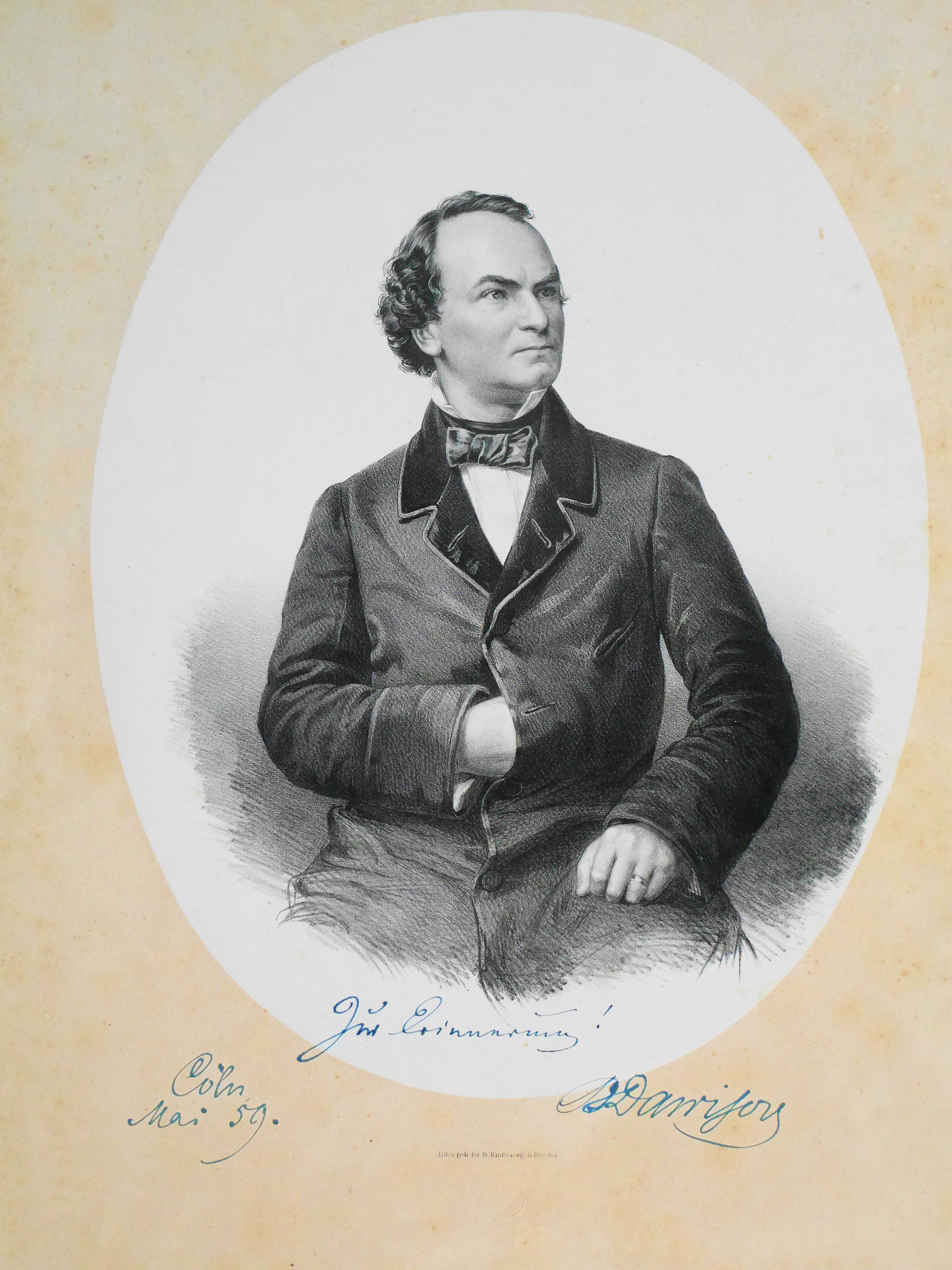
- Lithograph of Dawson circa 1850
- Born: 15 May 1818; Warsaw
- Died: 1 February 1872 (aged 53)
- Occupation: actor

Bogumil Dawison (15 May 1818 – 1 February 1872) was a Polish-born German actor.

He was born in Warsaw, of Jewish parents. At the age of nineteen he went on the stage. In 1839 he received an appointment to the theater of Lemberg in Galicia. In 1847 he played at Hamburg with marked success. He joined Burg theatre ensemble in Vienna in 1849 under the director Heinrich Laube. From 1849 to 1854 he was a member of the Burg theatre, and then became connected with the Dresden court theater. In the 1850s, he started a European tour, playing in Amsterdam, Paris, Warsaw, and St. Petersburg, and finally, a visit to the United States of America in 1866. In 1864 he was given a life engagement, but later resigned it. In 1866 Dawison was contracted to appear in New York by Elise Hoym, who was the director of Stadttheater. He appeared in a wide range of his popular roles, and received enthusiastic tribute from the press in New York. He died in Dresden in 1872.

In the classical repertory, he became widely known for his performance of Hamlet, among others. Dawison was considered in Germany an actor of a new type; a leading critic wrote that he and Marie Seebach swept like fresh gales over dusty tradition, and brushing aside the monotony of declamation gave to their roles more character and vivacity than had hitherto been known on the German stage. His chief parts were Mephistopheles, Franz Moor, Mark Antony, Hamlet, Charles V, Richard III and King Lear.
