= Joseph Schreyvogel =

Viennese writer, journalist and dramaturge

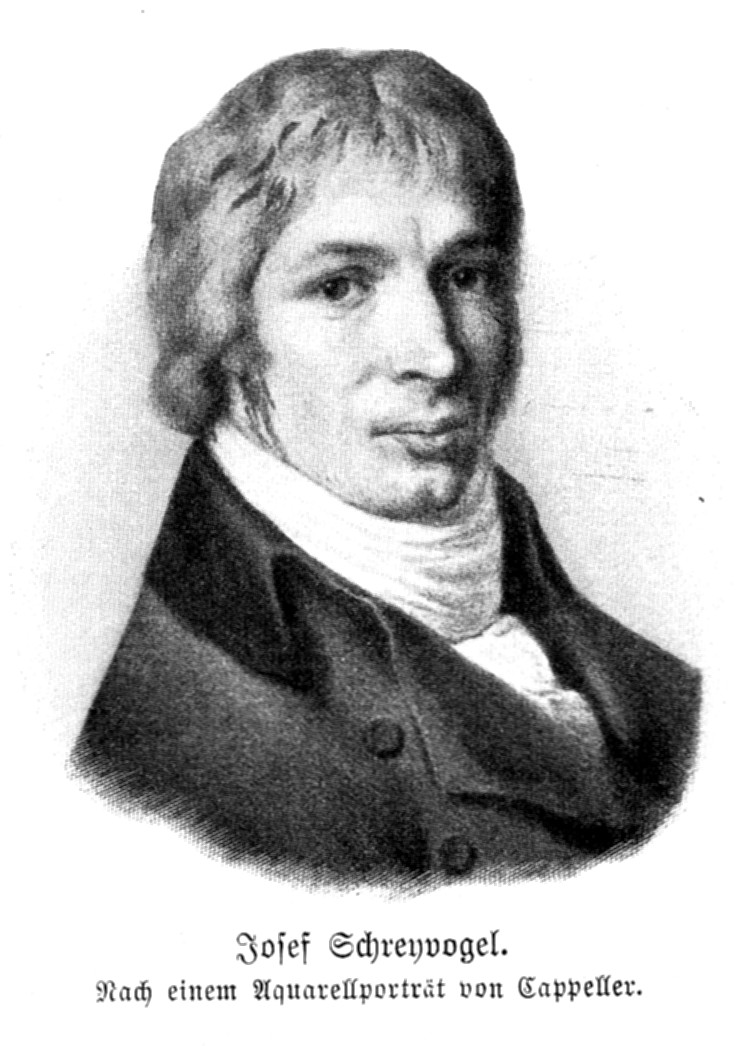
- Born: 27 March 1768; Vienna
- Died: 28 July 1832 (aged 64)
- Other names: Joseph Schreivogel; Pseudonyms: Karl August West, Thomas West, Gebrüder West
- Occupations: writer and journalist and dramaturge

Joseph Schreyvogel (27 March 1768 – 28 July 1832) was a Viennese writer and journalist. He also worked as a dramaturge.

Older sources sometimes change the spelling of his name to Joseph Schreivogel.

In addition to his own name, he sometimes wrote under pseudonyms. These included "Karl August West", "Thomas West" and "Gebrüder West" ("West brothers").

== Life ==
Joseph Schreyvogel was born in Vienna, the youngest of his parents' three recorded children. His father, Gottfried Schreyvogel, is variously described as a carpenter/cabinet maker and a "prosperous timber merchant". His mother, born Maria Anna Bäurin, was the daughter of a wheelwright from Swabia who had moved to Vienna. According to one source his youth was spent in dreamy idleness. He received much of his early "education" from an aunt who noticed how he delighted in the puppet theatre of her own children, and whose home he frequently visited. His interest thus pricked, he learned to read with remarkable rapidity, and quickly steeped himself in the comedic repertoire of the puppet world. Between 1779 and 1783 he attended the Piarist "Maria Treu" academy in Vienna's Josefstadt. By the time he left, it was as a prize winner. His parents were ambitious on his behalf and his father forced him to train for a legal career. He passed the necessary preparatory exams at Vienna University in 1786 but pursued his legal studies no further. His father had died in 1784.

In 1788 he suffered some kind of a mental crisis which led him to turn to the writings of Immanuel Kant, still a radical and polarising figure. Vienna was undergoing its own decade of enlightened radical reform at this time. In this context Schreyvogel turned to political journalism. He became one of the Danube monarchy's earliest advocates for Kantian philosophy. In 1792 he was contributing to L.A.Hoffmann's "Wiener Zeitschrift", and his contributions were appearing in 1793/94 in Johann B. von Alxinger's "Österreichische Monathsschrift" (monthly news journal). He became involved in a savage literary feud with Franz Felix Hofstätter, the former Jesuit whom Schreyvogel was happy to smear as a Jacobin, traitor and freemason.

Towards the end of 1794 he moved to Jena where a new intellectual awakening was taking place in the growing circle surrounding the philosopher-poet, Friedrich Schiller. During the next couple of years, without at this stage disclosing his authorship, Schreyvogel contributed a two act comedy, "Die Witwe" ("The Widow") (1973) to Schiller's "Neue Thalia" journal, also contributing to Wieland's literary journal "Mercur" the first parts of his novel "Der neue Lovelace" ("The New Lovelace") (1795/96) and numerous less substantial articles to the Jena Literature Newspaper. In autumn 1796 he returned to Vienna and supported himself by working as a private tutor.

His first professional contacts with the Vienna Court Theatre (Burgtheater) came between 1802 and 1804 where he served as literary consultant or, according to another source, "Court theatre secretary" following Kotzebue's resignation from his directorship of the theatre. For Schreyvogel this Burgtheater appointment was his first experience of a "government job".

Meanwhile, in 1802 he established, with friends that included Joseph Sonnleithner, a company called "Kunst- und Industrie-Comptoir zu Wien" (literally "Arts and Industry Bureau in Vienna"), a prestigious company whose activities including publishing works by Beethoven. However, the business was not immune from the financial collapse that affected the Habsburg monarchy as a result of the war, and in 1813 it went bankrupt. Schreyvogel was badly affected, losing his financial independence and having to be confined for a period in a sanatorium. After 1804 he had also remained active as a journalist, and in 1807/08 set up the "Sonntagsblatte" (Sunday newspaper), described in one source as a treasure chest of study, intelligent reading, philosophy and opinions on life and art. He worked on it as managing editor under his pseudonym "Thomas West", and during its early years wrote most of the content himself. "Sonntagsblatte" provided him with a platform for his hostility to the Romantic movement.

He returned to the Court Theatre (Burgtheater) in 1814, initially as "Theatre Secretary". He worked there, for most of the time effectively as theatre director, during what proved in many ways its golden age. In Metternich's Vienna he proved adept, as a theatrical director, at balancing commercial and popular priorities with the restrictions of censorship. He himself was appointed an assistant to the official censor in 1817 (or January 1818) with duties in the areas of fiction, journalism and, till 1823, theatre productions. Although he initially intended to use his censorship responsibilities to address some of the increasingly shrill attacks of the theatre critics, the inherent tensions in a position that made him responsible for regulating his own area of responsibility became increasingly stark, and he became entangled in conflict. It is not reported whether he actually expressed relief when the theatrical censorship responsibilities were removed from him in 1823. At the Burgtheater, along with less well known playwrights, he gave prominence to the works of Shakespeare, Schiller and Goethe - sometimes subjected to "textual improvements". He staged productions of a number of fashionable Spanish works translated/adapted by himself. He also recruited a generation of impressive actors. Nevertheless, in May 1832 he was retired in disgrace over "competence difficulties" (" Kompetenzschwierigkeiten"). A couple of months later, on 28 July 1832, he died in Vienna of cholera.
