= The Condemned (1975 film) =

1975 film

- Directed by: Axel Corti
- Written by: Michael Scharang (novel)
- Starring: Klaus Rott
- Cinematography: Xaver Schwarzenberger
- Release date: 25 April 1975 (Austria)
- Running time: 99 minutes
- Countries: Austria; West Germany
- Language: German

The Condemned (German: Totstellen – Der Sohn eines Landarbeiters wird Bauarbeiter und baut sich ein Haus) is a 1975 Austrian-West German drama film directed by Axel Corti. It was entered into the 9th Moscow International Film Festival.

== Cast ==
- Klaus Rott as Franz
- Wolfgang Hübsch as Abwerber
- Liliana Nelska as Maria
- Bruno Dallansky as Jungbauer
- Sylvia Haider as Erna
- Rudolf Melichar as Diplom-Ingenieur
- Hilde Sochor as Frau Baumeister
- Josef Hauser as Altbauer
