= Love Comes Lately =

2007 film by Jan Schütte

- DVD cover
- Directed by: Jan Schütte
- Screenplay by: Jan Schütte
- Based on: The Briefcase, Alone and Old Love by Isaac Bashevis Singer
- Produced by: Alex Gibney; Martin Hagemann; W. Wilder Knight II
- Starring: Otto Tausig; Rhea Perlman; Olivia Thirlby; Tovah Feldshuh
- Cinematography: Edward Kłosiński; Chris Squires
- Edited by: Katja Dringenberg; Renate Merck
- Music by: Henning Lohner
- Production company: Zero Fiction Film
- Distributed by: Kino International
- Release date: September 8, 2007 (TIFF)
- Running time: 86 minutes
- Countries: Austria; Germany; United States
- Language: English
- Box office: $127,958

Love Comes Lately (German: Bis später, Max!) is a 2007 film written for the screen and directed by Jan Schütte. The film is based on the short stories of Isaac Bashevis Singer.

== Plot ==
Elderly Jewish writer Max Kohn is an Austrian émigré whose overactive mind is causing a state of perpetual confusion. He's a successful author of short stories who lives in New York City and is so old-fashioned that he believes that the only proper way to write is by using a typewriter. Max has several women interested in seducing him, but he spends most of his time with fellow worrier Reisel. During a trip to speak in nearby Hanover Max begins editing his latest story—a wild tale of a Miami retiree who gets himself into various kinds of trouble. It doesn't take Max long to lose himself in his own writings, and pretty soon, he's mixed up in two sexy romances and an unsolved murder.

Upon returning to reality, Max begins to feel as if his own written words have begun to manifest themselves. A meeting with burned out former student Rosalie, with whom he shares a mutual attraction, follows, and later while heading to Springfield for another unwanted speaking engagement Max discovers that he has lost the speech he prepared. After a series of small adventures, Max decides to start writing a new story based on his recent life and featuring a protagonist named Harry—a thinly veiled stand-in for himself.

== Cast ==
- Otto Tausig as Max Kohn
- Rhea Perlman as Reisel
- John C. Vennema as Dr. Grosskopf
- Olivia Thirlby as Sylvia Brokeles
- Tovah Feldshuh as Ethel
- Bunny Levine as M.N.
- Brian Doyle-Murray as The Boss
- Elizabeth Peña as Esperanza
- Barbara Hershey as Rosalie
- Gurdeep Singh as H.P.
- Lee Wilkof as Professor Meyer

== Reception ==
The film received an approval score of 70% on Rotten Tomatoes based on 23 reviews, with an average rating of 6.1/10. The site's consensus reads: "Though it doesn't quite live up to the source material, this adaptation of three Isaac Bashevis Singer short stories is poignant and charming."

Nathan Lee of The New York Times wrote, "Max Kohn (Otto Tausig), the aging Lothario of Love Comes Lately, is very much like the movie itself: doddering and milquetoasty, but ultimately disarming. Blending three short stories by the Nobel laureate Isaac Bashevis Singer, the filmmaker Jan Schütte may well have made a minor classic for the retired-Jews-of-Miami set."

Ruthe Stein of the San Francisco Chronicle said, "One of the best compliments to be paid a movie based on fiction is that it compels you to read other things by the author. "Love Comes Lately," based on three short stories by Nobel Prize winner Isaac Bashevis Singer, is likely to elicit such a response.

Wesley Morris of The Boston Globe was more critical, writing, "The writer and director Jan Schütte has distilled three Isaac Bashevis Singer stories into a mild 80-or-so-minute project whose length matches its hero's age. The idea's not terrible, and no filmmaker has bothered with Singer for years, but this movie chooses to reduce the author's soulfulness to mirrored tales of lonely, randy seniors, all of whom Tausig plays. In one sense, it's a disservice. Imagine a film based on some James Baldwin writings whose conclusion was: Boy, he was frisky. In another, the movie does get at a certain woe that's true to Singer's work."
