= Maria Anna Trancart =

18th-century French-German ballerina

Maria Anna Trancart (fl. 1748 – fl. 1789), was a French-German ballerina. She was one of the more famous ballerinas of her time period; she was one of the first ballerinas engaged at the Burgtheater, where she performed in its inauguration in 1748. She had also performed in Stuttgart and the court theatre in Bavaria.
