= Bruno Dallansky =

Austrian actor (1928–2008)

- Born: 19 September 1928; Vienna, Austria
- Died: 5 August 2008 (aged 79); Vienna, Austria

Bruno Dallansky (19 September 1928 – 5 August 2008) was an Austrian actor who was best known for his television and stage roles.

In addition to his film and stage appearances, Dallansky taught acting at the Max Reinhardt Seminar in Vienna from 1965 until 1990. He also headed the Otto Falckenberg School in Munich, Germany, from 1979 until 1983.

Dallansky was married to actress Judith Holzmeister from 1955 until 1961, and the couple had one child. Dallansky and Holzmeister separated in 1961, but never divorced. Holzmeister died on 23 June 2008. Dallansky died a few weeks later in Vienna (5 August 2008).

== Filmography ==
- 1953: Flucht ins Schilf - Karl Balasz
- 1954: Schicksal am Lenkrad - Begleiter von Lohner
- 1955: Dunja
- 1957: And Lead Us Not Into Temptation - Ferdinand
- 1958: Night Nurse Ingeborg - Dr. Hans Markwitz
- 1960: Das Dorf ohne Moral - Sepp, Knecht am Gschwendnerhof
- 1969: Seven Days Grace - Herr Muhl
- 1971: Und Jimmy ging zum Regenbogen - Schäfer
- 1974: Der Abituriententag - Franz Adler
- 1975: The Condemned (TV Movie) - Jungbauer
- 1975-1982: Derrick - Hauptkommissar aus Miesbach / Herr Veith
- 1976: Die neuen Leiden des jungen W.
- 1977: Der Bauer und der Millionär (TV Movie) - Strassmeier
- 1979: Der Lebemann (TV Movie)
- 1980: Ein Abend mit Labiche (TV Movie)
- 1981: Der Mond ist nur a nackerte Kugel
- 1981: The Living Corpse (TV Movie) - Untersuchungsrichter
- 1983: Der Stille Ozean (TV Movie) - Hofmeister
- 1984: Waldheimat (TV Movie) - Talerbüchsen-Toni
- 1985: Girl in a Boot - Österreichischer Botschafter
- 1985: Via Mala (TV Mini-Series) - Schmid
- 1990: Der Bierkönig (TV Movie) - Baumeister Jackl
- 1994: Radetzkymarsch (TV Mini-Series)
- 2002: Gebürtig - Horst Hofstätter (final film role)
