= Crescendo (2019 film) =

2019 German drama film directed by Dror Zahavi

- Film poster
- Directed by: Dror Zahavi
- Written by: Stephen Glantz; Volker Kellner; Marcus O. Rosenmüller; Johannes Rotter; Dror Zahavi
- Produced by: Alice Brauner
- Starring: Peter Simonischek; Bibiana Beglau; Daniel Donskoy; Sabrina Amali; Mehdi Meskar; Eyan Pinkovich
- Cinematography: Gero Steffen
- Edited by: Fritz Busse
- Music by: Martin Stock
- Production companies: CCC Filmkunst; FilmVergnuegen; MZ-Film; Niama Film
- Distributed by: Camino Filmverleih
- Release dates: 3 July 2019 (Munich Film Festival); 16 January 2020 (Germany)
- Running time: 102 minutes
- Country: Germany
- Languages: German; English; Arabic; Hebrew
- Box office: $73,346

Crescendo is a 2019 German drama film directed by Dror Zahavi. It premiered at the Munich International Film Festival on July 3, 2019, where it received a 10-minute standing ovation. It opened to the public in Germany on January 16, 2020, and is scheduled for release in American cinemas in June by Menemsha Films. Due to the ongoing COVID-19 pandemic, the film will be released in virtual cinema starting May 1. The film received the 2020 Cinema for Peace Honorary Award.

The film is inspired by the real-life story of Daniel Barenboim's West–Eastern Divan Orchestra.

== Plot ==
A world-famous conductor, Eduard Sporck, is approached by Karla de Fries to put together an Israeli-Palestinian youth orchestra for a peace performance. He accepts, but first he must have his group overcome their beliefs, fears, and bigotry in order to come together.

== Cast ==
- Peter Simonischek as Eduard Sporck
- Bibiana Beglau as Karla de Fries
- Daniel Donskoy as Ron
- Sabrina Amali as Layla
- Mehdi Meskar as Omar
- Eyan Pinkovich as Shira Halevy
- Hitham Omari as Jussef
- Götz Otto as Bellmann
