= Peter von Braun =

Peter von Braun (1758 – 15 November 1819) was an Austrian industrialist, director of the court theatres in Vienna and patron of the arts.

== Life ==
He was the son of Johann Gottlieb von Braun, a court councillor. He entered the civil service in 1777, which he later left to found a silk factory in 1789. The business was successful. From 1794 until 1807, he was director of the two Vienna court theatres, the Burgtheater and the Theater am Kärntnertor; this period was regarded as a golden era for these theatres.

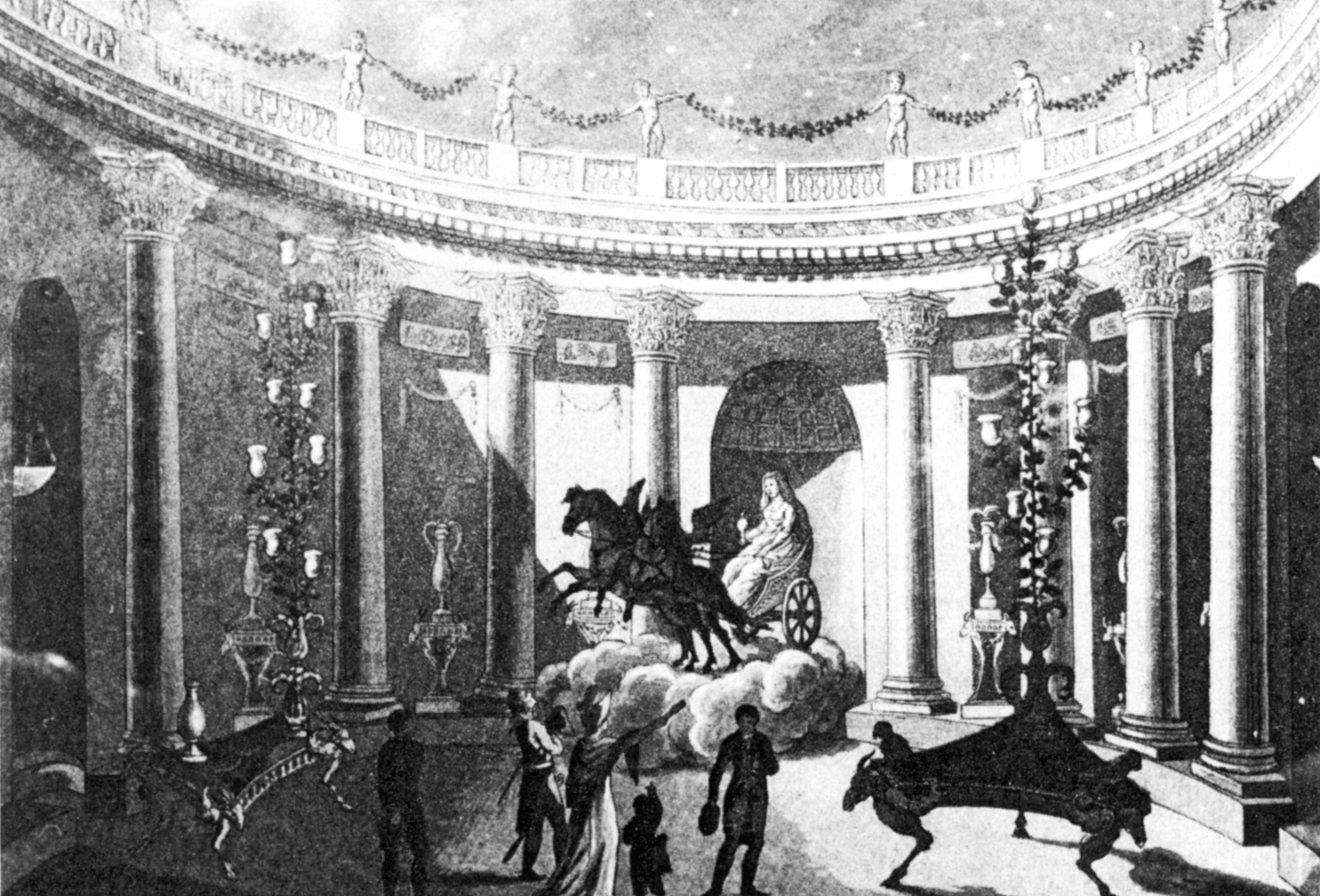
The Temple of the Night in the 19th century

He was raised to the rank of Freiherr (baron) in 1795, and in 1796 he became a court banker. In that year he bought the lordship of Schönau an der Triesting, near Vienna. He laid out a park there, which was open to the public, and created a "Temple of the Night", a mystical garden grotto which became a meeting place for the nobility. It contained inscriptions by August von Kotzebue, and Antonio Salieri, who often visited, composed music for the temple.

Von Braun was an important patron of the arts. He was a pianist, and composed music for the piano. He performed in 1801 an arrangement of Mozart's The Magic Flute with a new text by Christian August Vulpius.

He was a friend of Ludwig van Beethoven, early in the composer's career, and Beethoven participated in a concert which he arranged in 1797. As director of the Vienna court theatres, von Braun was involved in the staging of Beethoven's opera Fidelio in 1805. The composer had difficulties with the opera, and their relationship deteriorated.

Von Braun married Josephine von Högelmüller (c. 1766 – 1838). Piano works by Joseph Haydn, Anton Eberl and others were dedicated to her; Beethoven dedicated his Piano Sonatas Op. 14 (Nos. 9 and 10), and his Horn Sonata Op. 17, to her.
