= Franz Werfel =

Czech writer (1890–1945)

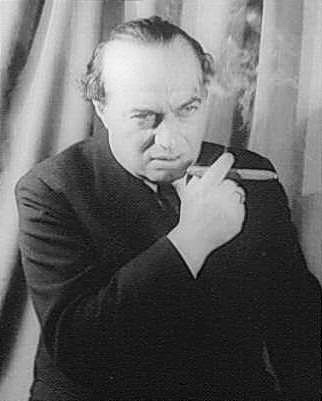
- Werfel photographed by Van Vechten, 1940
- Born: Franz Viktor Werfel; 10 September 1890; Prague, Austria-Hungary
- Died: 26 August 1945 (aged 54); Beverly Hills, California, U.S.
- Occupations: Novelist, playwright, poet
- Spouse: Alma Mahler (m. 1929)
- Relatives: Hanna Fuchs-Robettin (sister)

Signature
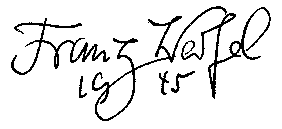

Franz Viktor Werfel (German: [fʁant͡s ˈvɛʁfl̩]; 10 September 1890 – 26 August 1945) was a Czech novelist, playwright, and poet whose career spanned World War I, the Interwar period, and World War II. He is primarily known as the author of The Forty Days of Musa Dagh (1933, English tr. 1934, 2012), a novel based on events that took place during the Armenian genocide of 1915, and The Song of Bernadette (1941), a novel about the life and visions of the French Catholic saint Bernadette Soubirous, which was made into a Hollywood film of the same name.

== Early life ==
Born in Prague, then in Kingdom of Bohemia, which was part of Austria-Hungary, Werfel was the first of three children of a wealthy manufacturer of gloves and leather goods, Rudolf Werfel. His mother, Albine Kussi, was the daughter of a mill owner. His two sisters were Hanna Fuchs-Robettin (born 1896) and Marianne Amalie (born 1899). His family was Jewish. As a child, Werfel was raised by his Czech Catholic governess, Barbara Šimůnková, who often took him to Mass in Prague's main cathedral.

Like the children of other progressive German-speaking Jews in Prague, Werfel was educated at a Catholic school run by the Piarists, a teaching order that allowed for a rabbi to instruct Jewish students for their bnei mitzvah. This, along with his governess's influence, gave Werfel an early interest (and expertise) in Catholicism, which soon branched out to other faiths, including Theosophy and Islam, such that his fiction, as well as his nonfiction, provides some insight into comparative religion.

== Career ==
Werfel began writing at an early age and, by 1911, had published his first book of poems, Der Weltfreund, which can be translated as "the friend to the world" as well as philanthropist, humanitarian, and the like. By this time, Werfel had befriended other German Jewish writers who frequented Prague's Café Arco, chief among them Max Brod and Franz Kafka, and his poetry was praised by such critics as Karl Kraus, who published Werfel's early poems in Kraus's journal, Die Fackel (The Torch). In 1912, Werfel moved to Leipzig, where he became an editor for Kurt Wolff's new publishing firm, where Werfel championed and edited Georg Trakl's first book of poetry. While he lived in Germany, Werfel's milieu grew to include Else Lasker-Schüler, Martin Buber, Rainer Maria Rilke, among other German-language writers, poets, and intellectuals in the first decades of the twentieth century.

With the outbreak of World War I, Werfel served in the Austro-Hungarian Army on the Russian front as a telephone operator. His duties both exposed him to the vicissitudes of total war as well as provided him with enough of a haven to continue writing Expressionist poems, ambitious plays, and letters voluminously. His eclectic mix of humanism, confessionalism, autobiography, as well as mythology and religiosity developed further during this time. His poems and plays ranged from scenes of ancient Egypt (notably the potentially monotheistic religion of Akhenaton) to occult allusions (Werfel had participated in séances with his friends Brod and Kafka) and incorporate a parable from the Baháʼí Faith in the poem "Jesus and the Carrion Path". His bias for Christian subjects, as well as his antipathy for Zionism, eventually alienated many of his Jewish friends and readers, including early champions such as Karl Kraus. Others, however, stood by him, including Martin Buber, who published a sequence of poems from Werfel's wartime manuscript, Der Gerichtstag (Judgment Day, published in 1919) in his monthly journal, Der Jude (The Jew). and wrote of Werfel in his prefatory remark:

Since I was first moved by his poems, I have opened (knowing well, I should say, it's a problem) the gates of my invisible garden [i.e., an imaginarium] to him, and now he can do nothing for all eternity that would bring me to banish him from it. Compare, if you will, a real person to an anecdotal one, a late book to an earlier, the one you see to you yourself; but I am not putting a value on a poet, only recognizing that he is one—and the way he is one.

In the summer of 1917, Werfel left the frontline for the Military Press Bureau in Vienna, where he joined other notable Austrian writers serving as propagandists, among them Robert Musil, Rilke, Hugo von Hofmannsthal, and Franz Blei. Through the latter, Werfel met and fell in love with Alma Mahler, widow of Gustav Mahler, the former lover of the painter Oskar Kokoschka, and the wife of the architect Walter Gropius, then serving in the Imperial German Army on the Western Front. Alma, who was also a composer, had already set one of Werfel's poems to music, despite Werfel's being much younger, shorter, and having Jewish features that she, being both anti-Semitic and attracted to Jewish men, initially found distasteful. Their love affair culminated in the premature birth of a son, Martin, in August 1918. Martin, who was given the surname of Gropius, died in May of the following year. Despite attempts to save his marriage to Alma, with whom he had a young daughter, Manon, Gropius reluctantly agreed to a divorce in 1920. Ironically, Alma refused to marry Werfel for the next nine years. However, Alma, more so than with her first two husbands and lovers, lent herself to the development of Werfel's career and influenced it in such a way that he became an accomplished playwright and novelist as well as poet. They married on 6 July 1929.

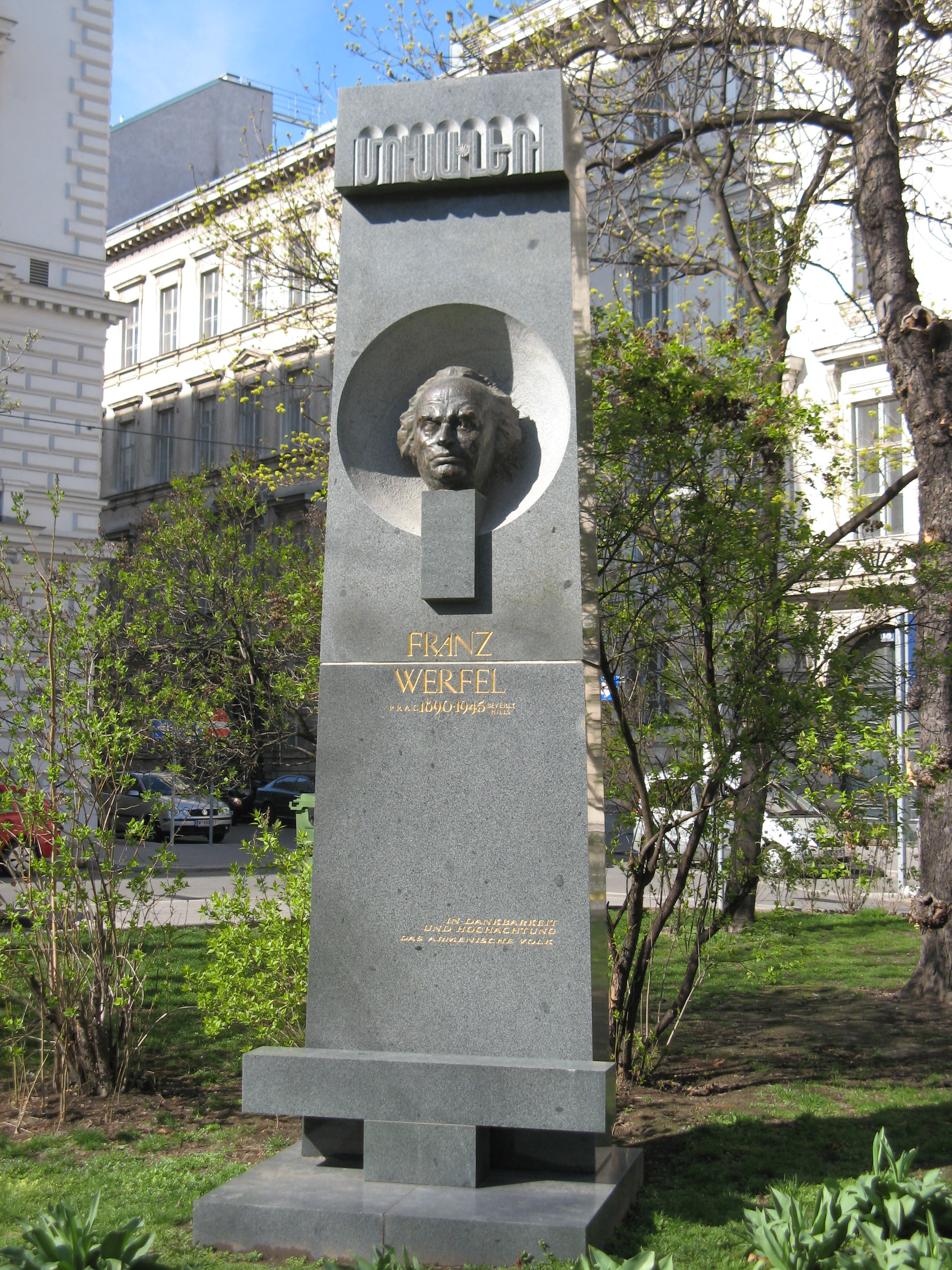
Memorial to Werfel in Vienna. The granite pillar carries the inscription: "In Dankbarkeit und Hochachtung – Das Armenische Volk" (In gratitude and respect, the Armenian people)

In April 1924, Verdi – Roman der Oper (Novel of the Opera) was published by Zsolnay Verlag, establishing Werfel's reputation as a novelist. In 1926, Werfel was awarded the Grillparzer Prize by the Austrian Academy of Sciences, and in Berlin, Max Reinhardt performed his play Juarez and Maximilian (depicting the struggle in 1860's Mexico between the Republican leader Benito Juárez and the French-backed Emperor Maximilian). By the end of the decade, Werfel had become one of the most important and established writers in German and Austrian literature and had already merited one full-length critical biography.

Werfel's journey (with his wife Alma) in 1930, to British-ruled Palestine, and his encounter with the Armenian refugee community in Jerusalem, inspired his novel The Forty Days of Musa Dagh which drew world attention to the Armenian genocide by the Ottoman government. Werfel lectured on this subject across Germany. The Nazi newspaper Das Schwarze Korps denounced him as a propagandist of "alleged Turkish horrors perpetrated against the Armenians". The same newspaper, suggesting a link between the Armenian and the later Jewish genocide, condemned "America's Armenian Jews for promoting in the U.S.A. the sale of Werfel's book".

Werfel was forced to leave the Prussian Academy of Arts in 1933. His books were burned by the Nazis. Werfel left Austria after the Anschluss in 1938 and went to France, where they lived in a fishing village near Marseille. Visitors to their home at this time included Bertolt Brecht and Thomas Mann. After the German invasion and occupation of France during World War II, and the deportation of French Jews to the Nazi concentration camps, Werfel had to flee again. With the assistance of Varian Fry and the Emergency Rescue Committee in Marseille, he and his wife narrowly escaped the Nazi regime, finding shelter for five weeks in the pilgrimage town of Lourdes. He also received much help and kindness from the Catholic orders that staffed the shrine. He vowed to write about the experience and, safe in the United States, he published The Song of Bernadette in 1941.

Fry and Unitarian Waitstill Sharp organized a secret crossing over the Pyrenees on foot. Assisted by Justus Rosenberg, they went to Madrid and then traveled on to Portugal. They stayed in Monte Estoril, at the Grande Hotel D'Itália, between 8 September and 4 October 1940. On the same day they checked out, they boarded the S.S. Nea Hellas headed for New York City, arriving on 13 October.

Werfel and his family settled in Los Angeles, where they met other German and Austrian emigrants, such as Mann, Reinhardt, and Erich Wolfgang Korngold as well as Czech (as Werfel was a Czechoslovak citizen). In southern California, Werfel wrote his final play, Jacobowsky and the Colonel (Jacobowsky und der Oberst) which was made into the 1958 film Me and the Colonel starring Danny Kaye; Giselher Klebe's opera Jacobowsky und der Oberst (1965) is also based on this play. Before his death, he completed the first draft of his last novel Star of the Unborn (Stern der Ungeborenen), which was published posthumously in 1946.

== Death ==
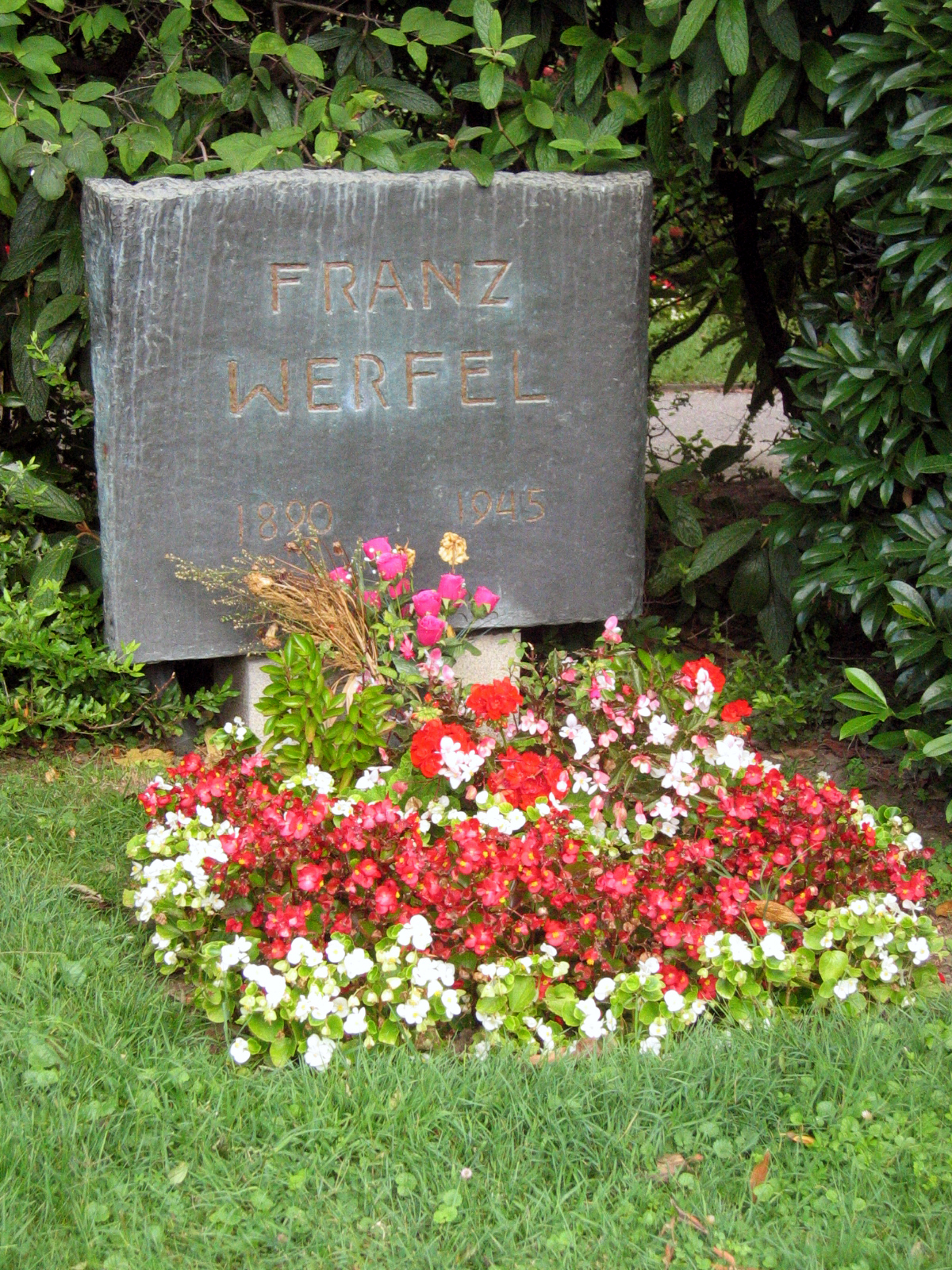
Werfel's grave in the Zentralfriedhof, Vienna

Franz Werfel died of heart failure in Los Angeles in 1945 and was interred there in the Rosedale Cemetery. However, his body was returned in 1975 to Vienna for reburial in the Zentralfriedhof.

=== Conversion to Catholicism ===
According to John J. Devlin, pastor of Saint Victor Parish in West Hollywood, Franz Werfel received baptism on his deathbed from a German priest. The matter, however, was not made public out of consideration for his Jewish father and mother.

== Honours and awards ==
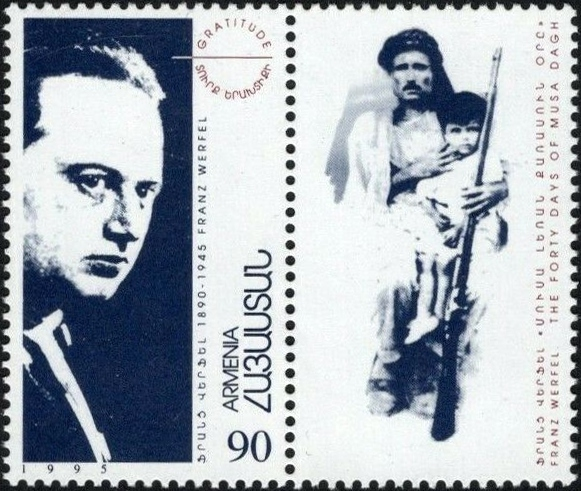
Armenian stamp (1995): Franz Werfel and a Hero of Musa Dagh

- 1926 Grillparzer Prize
- 1927 Czechoslovak State Award
- 1930 Schiller Prize
- 1937 Austrian Cross of Honour for Science and Art, 1st class
- 1949 Naming of Werfelstrasse in Hernals (Vienna)
- 1975 Grave of honor (German: Ehrengrab) in the Zentralfriedhof (Vienna)
- 1990 Stamp Austria, Franz Werfel 1890–1945
- 1995 Stamp Germany, Franz Werfel, 50th anniversary of Werfel's death
- 1995 Stamp Armenia, Franz Werfel and 40 Days of Musa Dagh Hero
- 2000 Monument on Schillerplatz in Vienna
- 2006 Posthumous Award of Armenian Honorary Citizenship; the plaque was presented to the Austrian National Library.

== Bibliography ==
In English (some of these titles are out of print):

- Mirror-Man: A Magic Trilogy (Spiegelmensch: Magische Trilogie) (1920), play
- The Trojans (1922) Play Published by Kurt Wolff as Die Troerinnen.
- Verdi. Novel of the Opera (1924), novel
- Juarez and Maximilian (1925), play
- Paul Among the Jews: A Tragedy (1926), play
- The Man Who Conquered Death (Der Tod des Kleinbürgers) (1928), short story
- Class Reunion (Der Abituriententag) (1928), novel (translated into English by Whittaker Chambers)
- The Forty Days of Musa Dagh (1933; revised and expanded edition, 2012), novel
- Hearken Unto the Voice, or Listen to the Voice, or Jeremiah (Höret die Stimme, or Jeremias) (1937), novel
- Embezzled Heaven (Der veruntreute Himmel) (1939), novel
- The Song of Bernadette (1941), novel
- Pale Blue Ink in a Lady's Hand (Eine blass-blaue Frauenschrift) (1941; 2012), novella
- Jacobowsky und der Oberst (1944), play
- Star of the Unborn (1945/46), science-fiction novel
- Verdi: The Man and His Letters, with Paul Stefan. New York, Vienna House 1973 ISBN 0844300888
- Totentanz: 50 zeitlose Gedichte, editor Martin Werhand. Melsbach, Martin Werhand Verlag 2016 ISBN 978-3-943910-72-8

== Adaptations of Werfel works ==
=== Film ===
- Juarez and Maximilian, directed by Miguel Contreras Torres (1934, based on the play Juarez and Maximilian)
- Juarez, directed by William Dieterle (1939, based on the play Juarez and Maximilian)
- The Song of Bernadette, directed by Henry King (1943, based on the novel The Song of Bernadette)
- Me and the Colonel, directed by Peter Glenville (1958, based on the play Jacobowsky and the Colonel)
- Embezzled Heaven, directed by Ernst Marischka (West Germany, 1958, based on the novel Embezzled Heaven)
- The Forty Days of Musa Dagh, directed by Sarky Mouradian (1982, based on the novel The Forty Days of Musa Dagh)

=== Television ===
- Die wahre Geschichte vom geschändeten und wiederhergestellten Kreuz, directed by Tom Toelle (West Germany, 1963, TV film, based on the eponymous story)
- Jacobowsky and the Colonel, directed by Rainer Wolffhardt (West Germany, 1967, TV film, based on the play Jacobowsky and the Colonel)
- The Man Who Conquered Death, directed by Hans Hollmann (West Germany/Austria, 1974, TV film, based on the story The Man Who Conquered Death)
- Class Reunion, directed by Eberhard Itzenplitz (West Germany, 1974, TV film, based on the novel Class Reunion)
- Cella oder Die Überwinder, directed by Eberhard Itzenplitz (West Germany/Austria, 1978, TV film, based on the unfinished novel Cella oder Die Überwinder)
- Die arge Legende vom gerissenen Galgenstrick, directed by Gaudenz Meili (East Germany, 1978, TV film, based on the eponymous story)
- Eine blassblaue Frauenschrift, directed by Axel Corti (Austria, 1984, TV film, based on the story Pale Blue Ink in a Lady's Hand)
- Jacobowsky and the Colonel, directed by Martin Huba (Czechoslovakia, 1987, TV film, based on the play Jacobowsky and the Colonel)
- Embezzled Heaven, directed by Ottokar Runze (Germany, 1990, TV film, based on the novel Embezzled Heaven)
- Class Reunion, directed by Viktor Polesný (Czech Republic, 2000, TV film, based on the novel Class Reunion)

=== Theatre ===
- Jacobowsky and the Colonel, 1944, adaptation of Jakobowsky und der Oberst by playwright S. N. Behrman. Opened at the Martin Beck Theatre in New York City.
- The Grand Tour, 1979, Broadway musical with music and lyrics by Jerry Herman, based on the play Jacobowsky and the Colonel (Jakobowsky und der Oberst)

== See also ==
- Witnesses and testimonies of the Armenian genocide
- Exilliteratur
- Franz Werfel Human Rights Award
- List of Austrian writers
