= Class Reunion (novel) =

Novel by Franz Werfel

- Author: Franz Werfel
- Original title: Der Abituriententag
- Translator: Whittaker Chambers
- Language: German
- Genre: Novel
- Publisher: P. Zsolnay
- Publication date: 1928
- Publication place: Austria
- English publication date: 1929
- Media type: Print (hardback & paperback)

Class Reunion (original title: Der Abituriententag) is a novel by Franz Werfel first published in German in 1928.

== Plot summary ==
The novel is about 43-year-old Dr. Ernst Sebastian, a lawyer who works as an Untersuchungsrichter (investigating judge) in the fictional town of Sankt Nikolaus during 1927. One Saturday afternoon a middle-aged man called Franz Adler, who has been arrested for the murder of a prostitute, is brought before him. During the interview—a preliminary hearing during which the two men are alone in Sebastian's office—Sebastian recognizes Adler as his old classmate, who attended the secondary school in Sankt Nikolaus, which was then in Austria-Hungary, for two years when they were both 16 and 17. Adler, however, who appears to him fearful and beaten by life, does not seem to recognize the judge, and Sebastian decides to postpone any private talk with Adler till the following Monday.

As it happens, that same Saturday night Sebastian attends a class reunion (the Abituriententag of the title) occasioned by the 25th anniversary of his Matura (Class of '02), a meeting he knows he will regret going to as it will bring back both a plethora of unpleasant memories and a confrontation with the bourgeois self-satisfaction of his former classmates.

That night, Sebastian does not go to sleep. Rather, upset by his chance meeting with Adler and the enervating talk at the class reunion, he sits down at his desk and writes down a confession in shorthand, which on the following morning turns out to be indecipherable to everyone including himself—except to the reader, who can read Sebastian's confession as the middle part of the novel.

At the age of 16, Sebastian, on the command of his father, the highest-ranking judge in Austria-Hungary, has to leave the prestigious Schottengymnasium in Vienna due to poor grades and is forced to continue his education in the provincial town of Sankt Nikolaus, where he stays with two aunts of his. A mediocre pupil, he tries desperately to attract the attention of his new classmates, who turn out to be very reluctant to accept the new boy into their close-knit community. In the course of one school year, however, Sebastian succeeds in tempting, and eventually seducing, many of his classmates to truancy, stay up late on a regular basis, lie to their teachers and parents, drink excessive amounts of alcohol, and eventually associate with prostitutes.

In particular, although he is aware of his mediocre performance at school and also of his own abominable character, Sebastian, rather than repent for his sins, sets out to conquer the intellectual superiority of his classmate Adler, a red-haired Jew who writes dramas and philosophical treatises, though he is only 17. To get rid of his rival once and for all, Sebastian pushes him into forging a document. The truth comes out, and before Adler can be expelled, Sebastian helps him escape to Germany, thus ensuring that his own part in the crime will never be revealed.

On the Monday following the class reunion, Adler is again brought before Sebastian. This time the judge does reveal his identity to Adler, but on closer inspection of the file in front of him he finds out that the man's assertion that he has never gone to school in Sankt Nikolaus is true.

== Role in the Hiss case ==
In 1929, Whittaker Chambers translated Der Abituriententag from German, and it was published in English as Class Reunion.

During the trials of Alger Hiss in 1949, his defense team included in their attacks on Chambers' character the argument that Chambers was accusing Hiss out of a suggestion from Class Reunion.

In his memoir, Chambers wrote:

In Class Reunion, Dr. Carl Binger, the psychologist in the Hiss trials, undertook to discover the psychological clue to Chambers' "mysterious motives" in charging that Alger Hiss had once been a Communist. Chambers was the bad boy and Hiss was the good boy of Class Reunion, and the novel, unread by me for some twenty years, had put the idea of ruining Hiss in my mind – why I never quite understood, since it always seemed to me that if I had been bent on ruining Alger Hiss from base motives, the idea might well have occurred to me without benefit of Franz Werfel. But to many enlightened minds Class Reunion became a book of revelation.

I have always held that anyone who takes the trouble to read Class Reunion without having made up his mind in advance, can scarcely fail to see that, if there are any similarities at all between the characters, it is Hiss who superficially resembles the bad boy and Chambers who superficially resembles his victim.

== Film adaptation ==
In 1974, a German language television movie with the same title was produced for the ZDF. It was directed by Eberhard Itzenplitz and starred Hans Jaray, Jan Christian, Bruno Dallansky, Peter Faerber, and Heinz Moog.

== See also ==
- Franz Werfel
- Whittaker Chambers
