= Adolf Rott =

German theatre director

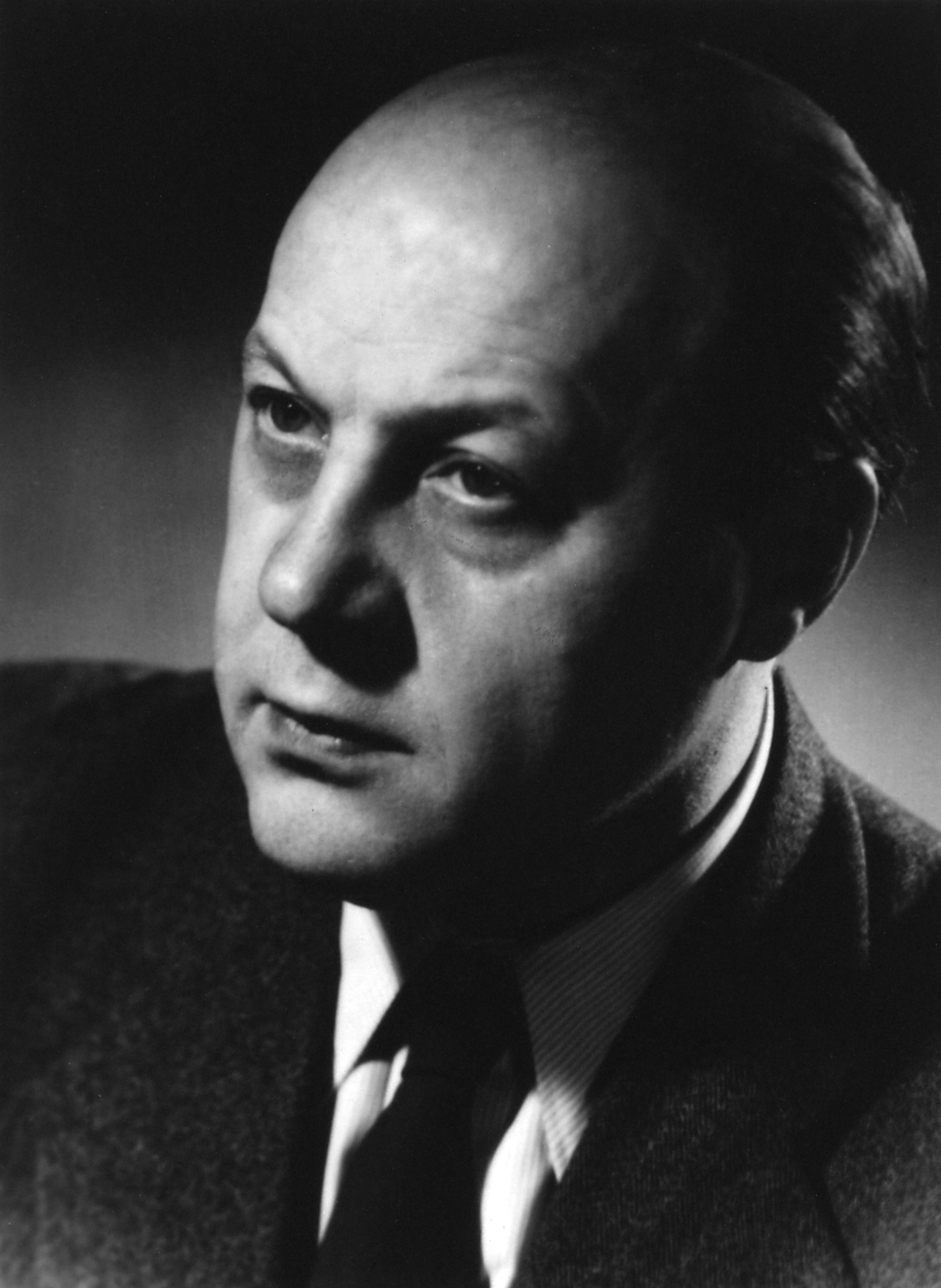
Adolf Rott

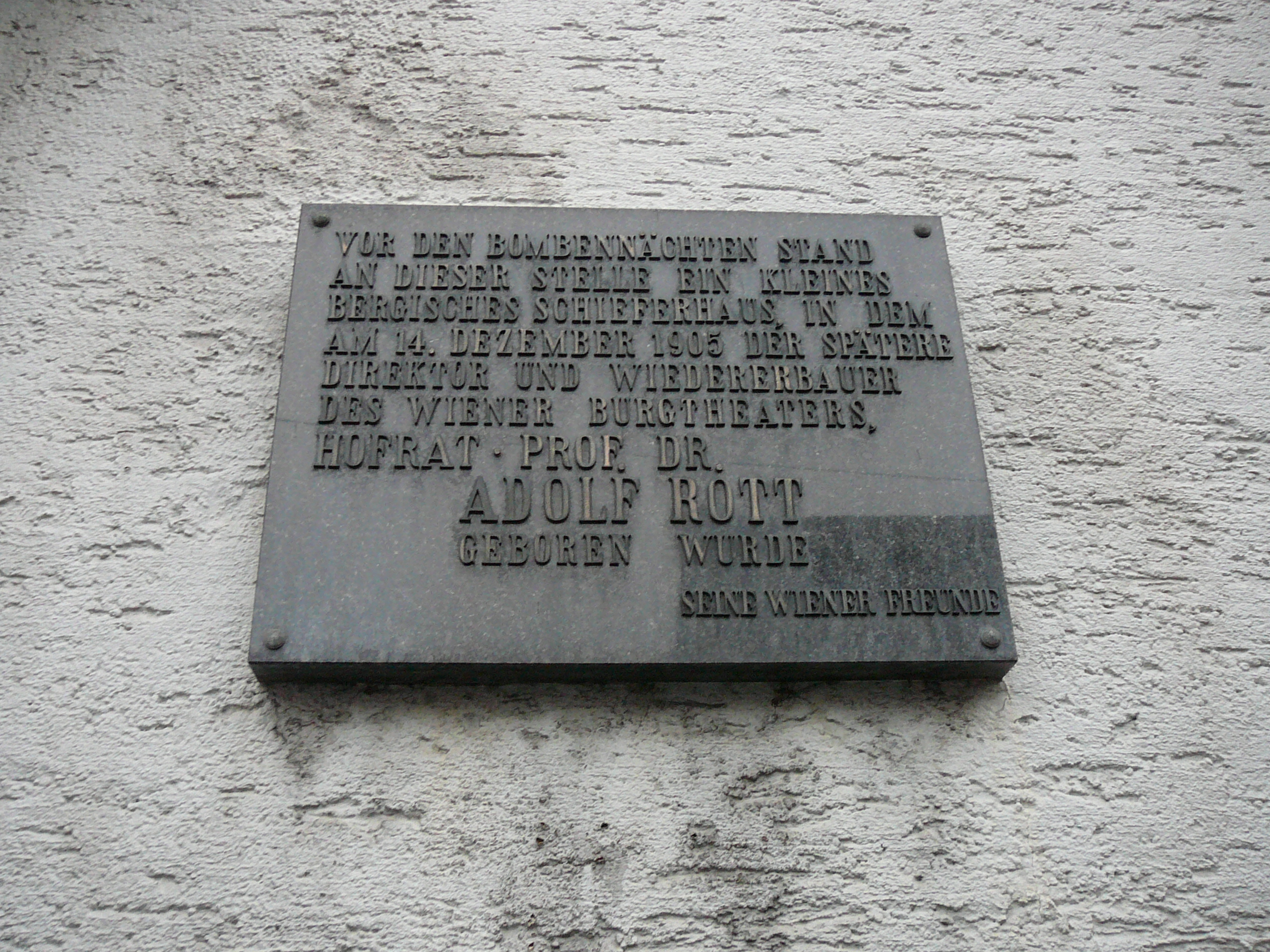
Commemorative plaque at the site of his birthplace, inaugurated on 1 March 1982; Rott himself was present at the inauguration.

Adolf Rott (14 December 1905 – 24 July 1982) was a German theatre director, theatre artistic director, and theatre manager. From 1954 to 1959, he was director of the Vienna Burgtheater.

== Life ==
Rott was born in Barmen. After his Abitur, Rott studied law and began his theatre career as a directing student of Louise Dumont at the Städtische Bühnen in Düsseldorf. There, he worked as a student director and later as an assistant to Peter Scharoff. This was followed by two itinerant years as director, dramaturge and actor, and then a series of engagements as head stage manager, dramaturge, actor and assistant director at larger theatres. In 1933, Rott was engaged as director at the Konzerthaus Berlin, and in 1934 at the Deutsches Schauspielhaus. The next station was the Stadttheater Danzig, where he was deputy general director, head play director and dramaturge; at the same time, he was director of the state drama school. In 1936, Rott was engaged at the Burgtheater Vienna. From 1 September 1954 to 31 August 1959, he was the first director of the reopened Burgtheater, fiercely hated by critics such as Friedrich Torberg and Hans Weigel.

Until 1945 he was also a teacher at the Max Reinhardt Seminar in Vienna. After 1945, he was appointed head director of the Burgtheater, the Vienna State Opera and the Vienna Volksoper, where he created essential productions that were on the repertoire of these stages for years.

Rott was a co-founder of the Graz Festival. As permanent director of the Bregenz Festival, he drew the attention of foreign countries to this event by staging classical operettas on the Lake Constance stage. In addition to his work in Vienna, Rott was Heinz Tietjen's first collaborator at the Deutsche Oper Berlin after 1945. After his resignation as director of the Burgtheater, Rott worked as chief director at the Deutsche Oper am Rhein in Düsseldorf, but returned again and again to Vienna for work as chief director of the Austrian Federal Theatres.

His work at opera houses in the United States falls into this period (San Francisco, Chicago, Philadelphia, New York City, Dallas, Fort Worth), in (la Scala, Teatro la Fenice, Große Oper in Rome, Teatro San Carlo, Teatro Massimo) and at many other great opera stages such as Covent Garden Opera in London, Edinburgh Festival Theatre, Paris Opera, Teatro Real, Opernhaus Zürich and Grand Théâtre de Genève, numerous opera stages in Germany, the Finnish National Theatre, the Royal Swedish Opera, the Oslo Opera House and the Copenhagen Opera House.

Rott is considered the innovator of the Viennese classical operetta. He exported this genre to many European countries.

Rott died at the age of 76 on 24 July 1982 in Vienna.

== Awards ==
On the occasion of the reopening of the Burgtheater on the Ring, to the reconstruction of which he contributed significantly, Adolf Rott received a decree on 11 October 1955 in which he was thanked and acknowledged by the federal government. At the opening ceremony in October 1955, the members of the Burgtheater awarded him the Ring of Honour of the colleagues for his commitment. In the course of the years after 1945, he was appointed professor, privy councillor and honorary member of the Burgtheater. In 1975 he became an honorary member of the Volksoper.

He also received the following honours and awards:

- Commander of the Order of Saint Olav of the Norwegian Crown.
- Commander of the Komtur (Ordenskunde) of the Silver Lion of Finland
- Grand Order of Merit of the Federal Republic of Germany of the Federal Republic of Germany.
- Decoration of Honour for Services to the Republic of Austria
- Grand Decoration of Honour in Gold for Services to the Republic of Austria.
- Commander of the Royal Spanish Order of Merit
- Officer of the French Legion of Honour
- Ehrenmedaille der Bundeshauptstadt Wien
- Holder of the Grand Silver Medal of Honour of the Swedish National Theatre Helsinki.
- Honorary member of several European theatre organisations.

== Memorial plaque ==
Vor den Bombennächten stand
an dieser Stelle ein kleines
bergisches Schieferhaus, in dem
am 14. Dezember 1905 der spätere
Direktor und Wiedererbauer
des Wiener Burgtheaters
Hofrat Prof. Dr.
Adolf Rott
geboren wurde
seine Wiener Freunde

— Commemorative plaque on the site of his birthplace
