= Gebürtig =

2002 film

- Directed by: Robert Schindel; Lukas Stepanik
- Written by: Robert Schindel; Lukas Stepanik
- Starring: Peter Simonischek
- Cinematography: Edward Kłosiński
- Edited by: Hubert Canaval
- Music by: Peter Ponger
- Release date: 5 April 2002
- Running time: 110 minutes
- Countries: Austria; Germany
- Language: German

Gebürtig is a 2002 Austrian drama film directed by Robert Schindel and Lukas Stepanik. It was selected as the Austrian entry for the Best Foreign Language Film at the 75th Academy Awards, but it was not nominated.

== Cast ==
- Peter Simonischek as Hermann Gebirtig
- Ruth Rieser as Susanne Ressel
- August Zirner as Danny Demant
- Katja Weitzenböck as Crissie Kalteisen
- Daniel Olbrychski as Konrad Sachs
- Corinna Harfouch as Else Sachs
- Samuel Finzi as Emanuel Katz
- Annemarie Düringer as Amalie Katz
- Branko Samarovski as Willi Klang
- Otto Tausig as Old Man at Casting
- Jörg Panknin as Theodor Sachs
- Ernst Stankovski as Karl Ressel
- Edd Stavjanik as Rudolf Pointner
- Peter Matic as David Lebensart
- Bruno Dallansky as Horst Hofstätter

== See also ==
- List of submissions to the 75th Academy Awards for Best Foreign Language Film
- List of Austrian submissions for the Academy Award for Best Foreign Language Film
