= Otto Tausig =

Austrian writer, director and actor

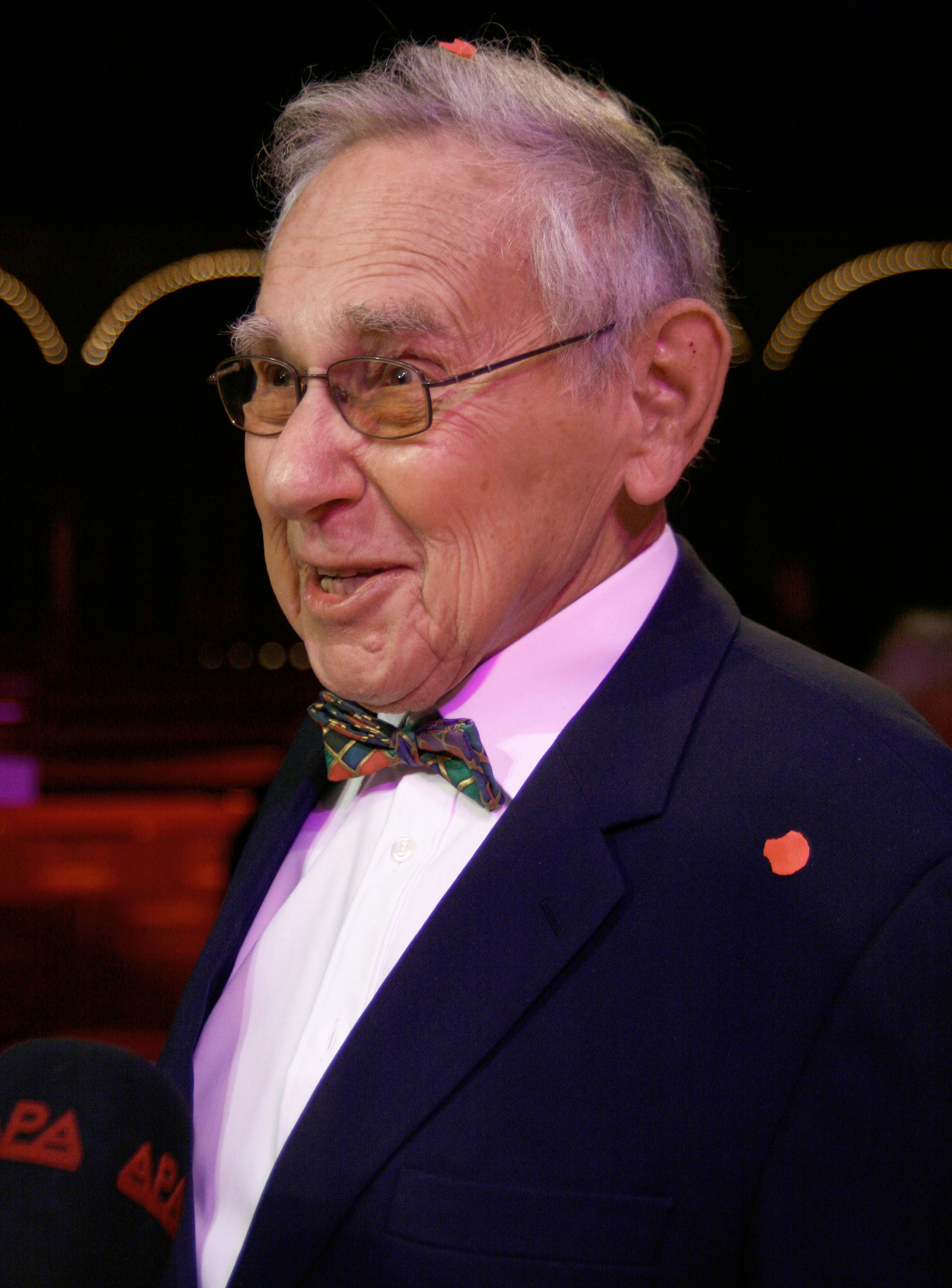
- Tausig on receiving the Nestroy Theatre Award for Lifetime Achievement
- Born: Otto Bruno Tausig; 13 February 1922; Vienna, Austria
- Died: 10 October 2011 (aged 89); Vienna
- Occupations: Writer, film director, actor
- Years active: 1956–2011

Otto Tausig (13 February 1922 – 10 October 2011) was an Austrian writer, director and actor. Although he usually appeared in German language films, he also played in English language films such as Love Comes Lately, and in French language films such as La Reine Margot and Place Vendôme.

== Life and career ==
Tausig was the son of Jewish female author Franziska Tausig. When the Nazis annexed Austria in 1938, she managed to send 16-year-old Otto to England in answer to an advertisement for factory workers which had been posted in The Times. The two were eventually reunited in Vienna in 1948.

Tausig returned to Austria in 1946 and enrolled in the Max Reinhardt Seminar in Vienna. In 1948 he began as an actor, director and chief editor at the New Theatre in the Scala.

The New Theatre closed in 1956, after which Tausig worked at the Deutsches Theater and the Volksbühne in East Berlin, as a screenwriter and director of satirical short films of DEFA, the so-called "Das Stacheltier". In 1960 he moved to Zurich to work at the Schauspielhaus as a free-lance actor and director. A decade later, Tausig was an ensemble member and director at the Vienna Burgtheater, where he was active until 1983.

Tausig also worked as a freelance artist throughout the German-speaking world, and taught courses at the Max Reinhardt Seminar. He frequently wrote and directed German television films. He was cremated at Feuerhalle Simmering, his ashes are buried in Vienna Central Cemetery.

== Awards ==
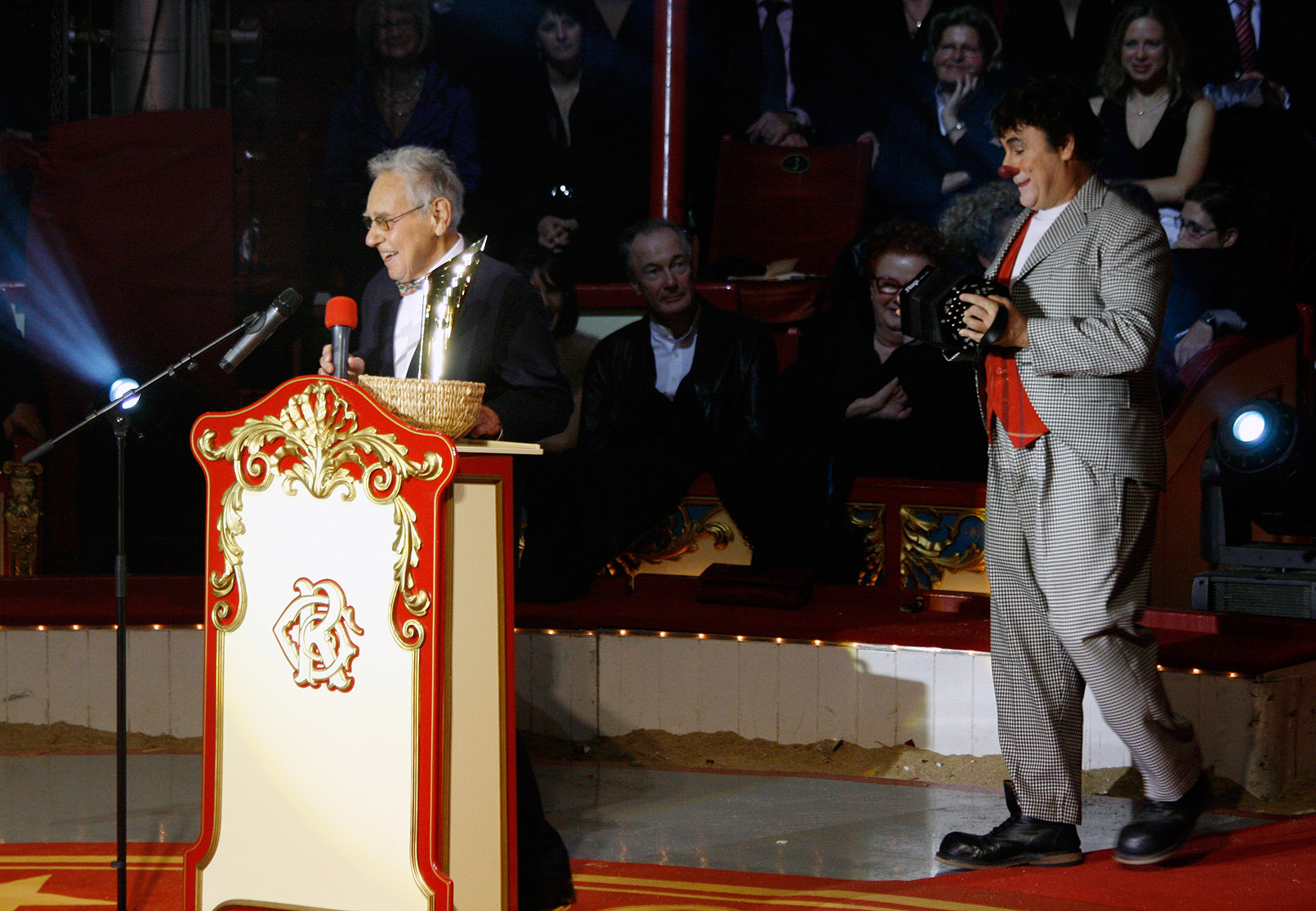
Tausig winning the Nestroy Theatre Award for Lifetime Achievement

- 1995: Johann Nestroy Ring
- 1997: Bruno Kreisky Award for Services to the Human Rights
- 2005: European Peace Rose Waldhausen
- 2007: Austrian Cross of Honour for Science and Art, 1st class
- 2009: Nestroy Theatre Prize, Award for Lifetime Achievement

== Filmography ==
- Gasparone (1955)
- Kurzer Prozess (1967) as Brenner
- Bomber & Paganini (1976) as Simulant
- Attempted Flight (1976) as Maurer
- Den Tüchtigen gehört die Welt (1981) as Kramml – Gemüsehändler
- What's Up, Chancellor? (1984)
- Nocturne indien (1989) as Peter Schlemihl
- Abraham's Gold (1990) as Pfarrer
- Bye Bye America (1994) as Isaak Aufrichtig
- La Reine Margot (1994) as Mendès
- Die Schuld der Liebe (1997) as Auracher
- Place Vendôme (1998) as Samy
- Black Flamingos – Sie lieben euch zu Tode (1998)
- Nobel (2001) as Gustav
- Everyman's Feast (2002) as Jan Jedermann's father
- Gebürtig (2002) as Alter Mann beim Casting
- Epsteins Nacht (2002) as Karl Rose
- SuperTex (2003) as Van Gelder
- Poor Relatives (2005) as Samuel
- Love Comes Lately (2007) as Max Kohn
- Das Vaterspiel (2009) as Großvater
- Berlin 36 (2009) as Leo Löwenstein
