= Peter Simonischek =

Austrian actor (1946–2023)

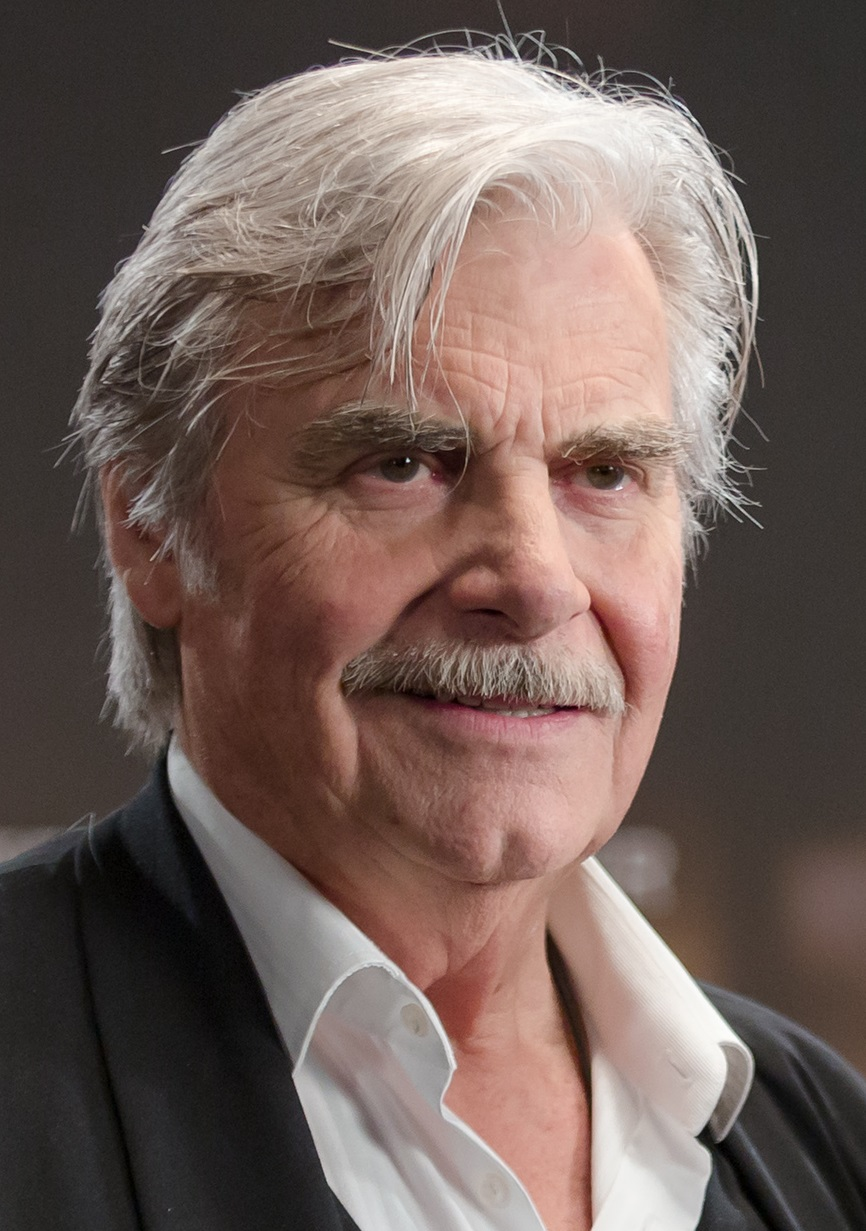
- Simonischek in 2017
- Born: 6 August 1946; Graz, Austria
- Died: 29 May 2023 (aged 76); Vienna, Austria
- Occupation: Actor
- Years active: 1980–2023
- Notable work: Toni Erdmann

Peter Simonischek (6 August 1946 – 29 May 2023) was an Austrian actor. He was a celebrated stage performer and a regular ensemble member of the Burgtheater from 1999. He often appeared at the Salzburg Festival and had played the title role in the play Jedermann numerous times.

In addition, he also appeared in more than sixty films since 1980. Simonischek was perhaps best-known to international audiences for his leading role in the critically acclaimed comedy-drama Toni Erdmann (2016).

Simonischek grew up in Markt Hartmannsdorf, a municipality in the state of Styria, where his father was a dentist. His sons, Max Simonischek and Kaspar Simonischek, are also actors.

Simonischek died after a short, serious illness on 29 May 2023, at the age of 76.

== Selected filmography ==
Year	Title	Role	Notes
1980	Das eine Glück und das andere	Anton Jutz	TV film
1983	Herrenjahre	Bruno Melzer	TV film
1986	The Lenz Papers	Andreas Lenz	TV miniseries
1988	Love and Fear	Massimo	
1989	Sukkubus	Senn	
1991	Success	Martin Krüger	
1991	The Mountain	Kreuzpointner	
1993	Krücke	Ferdi	
2002	Gebürtig	Hermann Gebirtig	
2003	Hierankl	Goetz Hildebrand	
2008	The Sibyl Cipher	Paul Holland	TV film
2011	Years of Love	Uli	TV film
2012	Ludwig II	Ludwig Freiherr von der Pfordten	
2013	Ruby Red	Lord of St. Germain	
2013	Der Kaktus	Heinrich Bittner	TV film
2013	October November	Father	
2014	Clara Immerwahr	Karl Engler	TV film
2014	Sapphire Blue	Lord of St. Germain	
2016	Toni Erdmann	Winfried Conradi / Toni Erdmann	European Film Award Best Actor; London Critics Circle Film Awards Best Actor (nominated); Toronto Film Critics Association Awards Best Actor (nominated)
2016	Emerald Green	Lord of St. Germain	
2016	Wunderlich's World	Walter Wunderlich	
2016	Lou Andreas-Salomé, The Audacity to be Free	Lou's Father	
2018	Kursk	Admiral Vyacheslav Grudzinsky	
2018	The Interpreter	Georg Graubner	
2019	Crescendo	Eduard Spork	
2021	Army of Thieves	Locksmith	
2022	Fantastic Beasts: The Secrets of Dumbledore	Warder	
2023	Measures of Men	Josef Ritter von Waldstätten	
