= Max Simonischek =

Austrian–Swiss actor (born 1982)

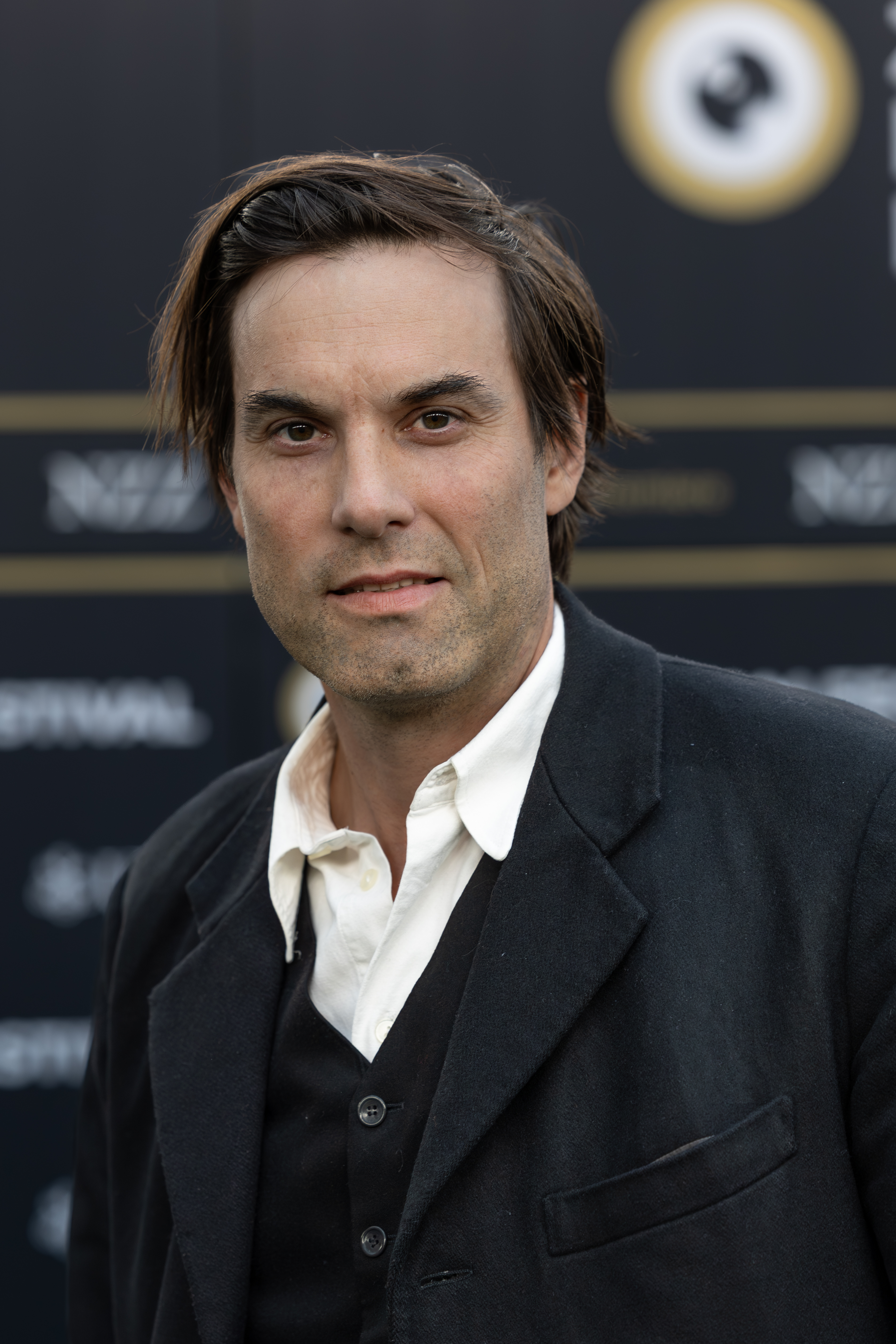
Max Simonischek on the Green Carpet at the 2025 Zurich Film Festival

Maximilian Simonischek (born October 19, 1982 in Berlin) is a German-born Swiss actor. He is the son of the actors Peter Simonischek and Charlotte Schwab.

== External links (in German) ==
- – Max Simonischek als ZDF-Fernsehkommissar Lukas Laim, Pressedokumentation
- – Warum Simonischek das Theater bevorzugt, Das Magazin vom 6. August 2015
- – Wenn er in der Erde wühlt, röchelt, sich die Haare rauft, wird Simonischek eins mit Kafkas Erzählung: Kritik der Neuen Zürcher Zeitung
- Geliebt wird er nicht, lieben kann er nicht – Vorschau zu den Salzburger Festspielen in Die Presse vom 10. Juni 2014
- Max Simonischek Fanpage – Facebookseite des Schauspielers mit zahlreichen Interviews, Fotostrecken und Filmausschnitten sowie aktuellen Infos
- Webauftritt Filmmakers – zahlreiche Filmausschnitte mit Max Simonischek
- Max Simonischek auf der Seite pr-emami
- Den sollten Sie sich merken: Max Simonischek – Porträt in 20 Minuten vom 27. Februar 2014
- Tragende Rollen – Filmporträt in der Sendung „Glanz&Gloria“ des Schweizer Fernsehens
- Zeppelin-Absturz soll Quotenhoch bringen – Bericht zu den Hindenburg-Dreharbeiten bei morgenpost.de, 19. Januar 2011
- Thomsen, Henrike (February 26, 2008). "Ein begabter Bürdenträger". Spiegel Online.
