= Burgtheater =

National theatre in Vienna, Austria

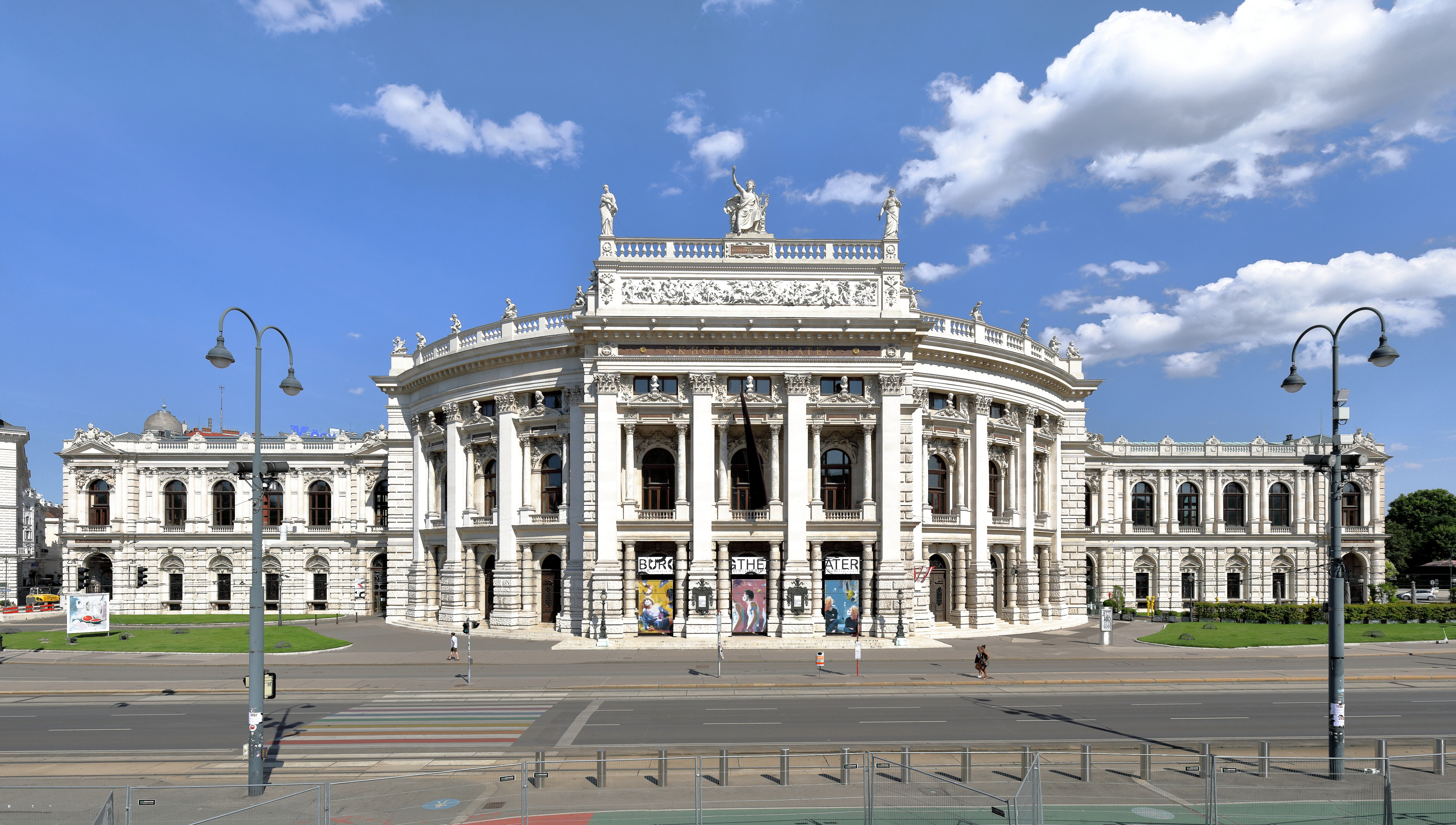
- Interactive map of Burgtheater
- Former names: K.K. Theater an der Burg; K.K. Hofburgtheater; K.K. Hoftheater nächst der Burg
- Address: Universitätsring 2 Vienna; Austria
- Coordinates: 48°12′37″N 16°21′41″E
- Type: Theater

Construction
- Opened: 14 March 1741

Website
- burgtheater.at

The Burgtheater (German: [ˈbʊʁk.teˌaːtɐ]; literally: "Castle Theater" but alternatively translated as "(Imperial) Court Theater", originally known as K.K. Theater an der Burg, then until 1918 as the K.K. Hofburgtheater, is the national theater of Austria, located in Vienna. It is the most important German-language theater and one of the most important theatres in the world. The Burgtheater was opened in 1741 and has become known as die Burg by the Viennese population; its theater company has created a traditional style and speech typical of Burgtheater performances.

== History ==
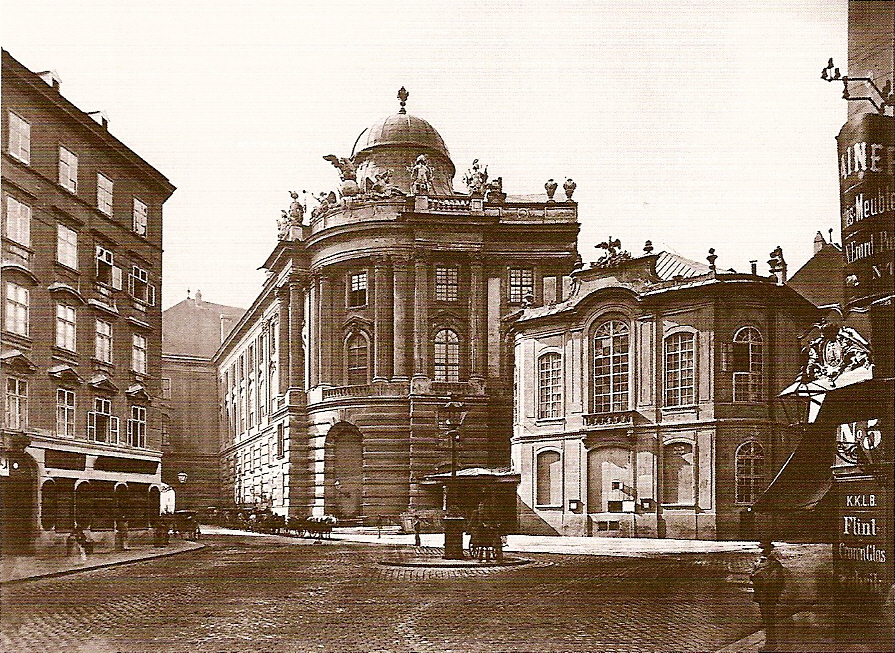
The old Burgtheater (before 1888)

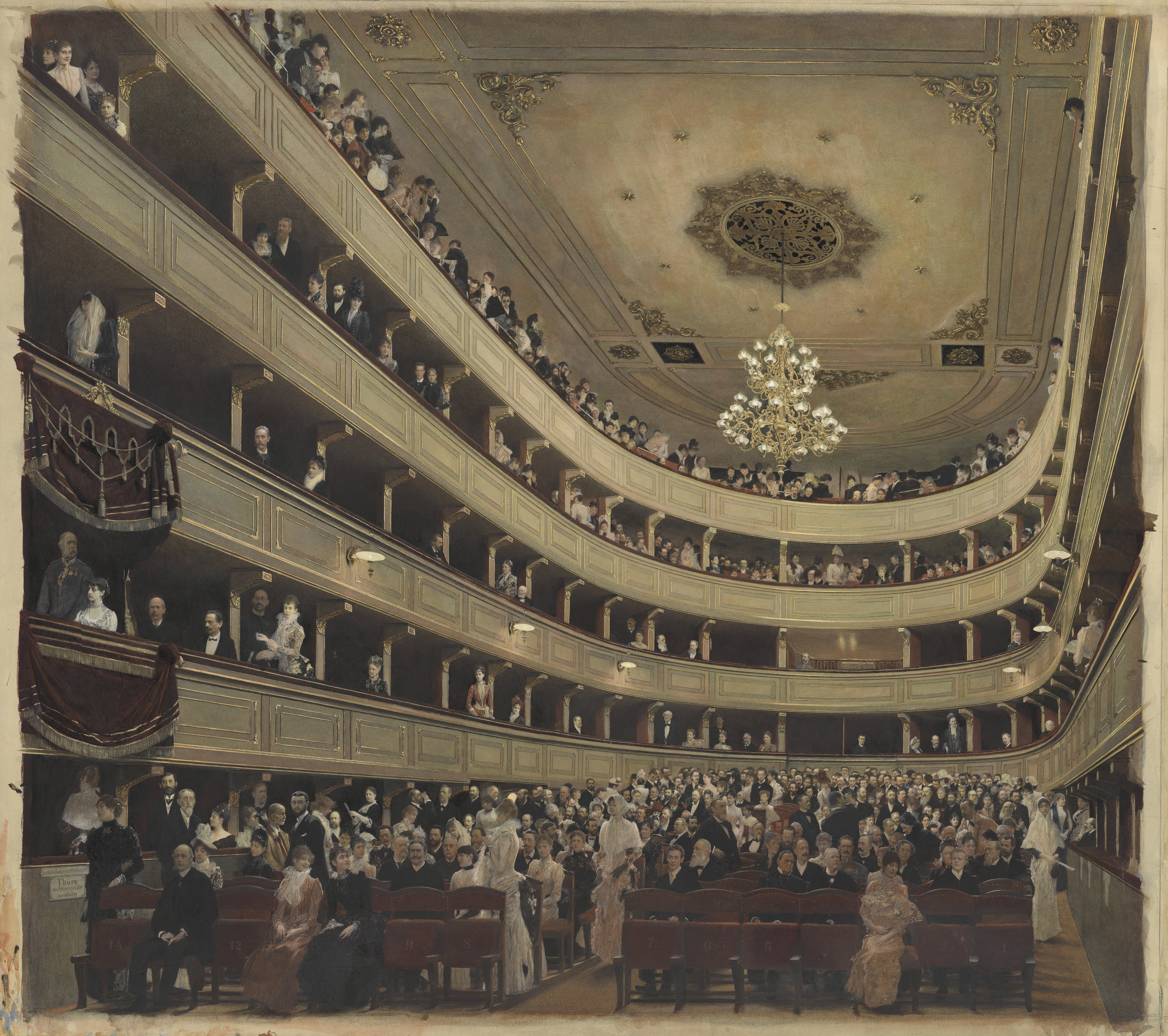
Gustav Klimt's Auditorium of the Old Burgtheater (1888–1889)

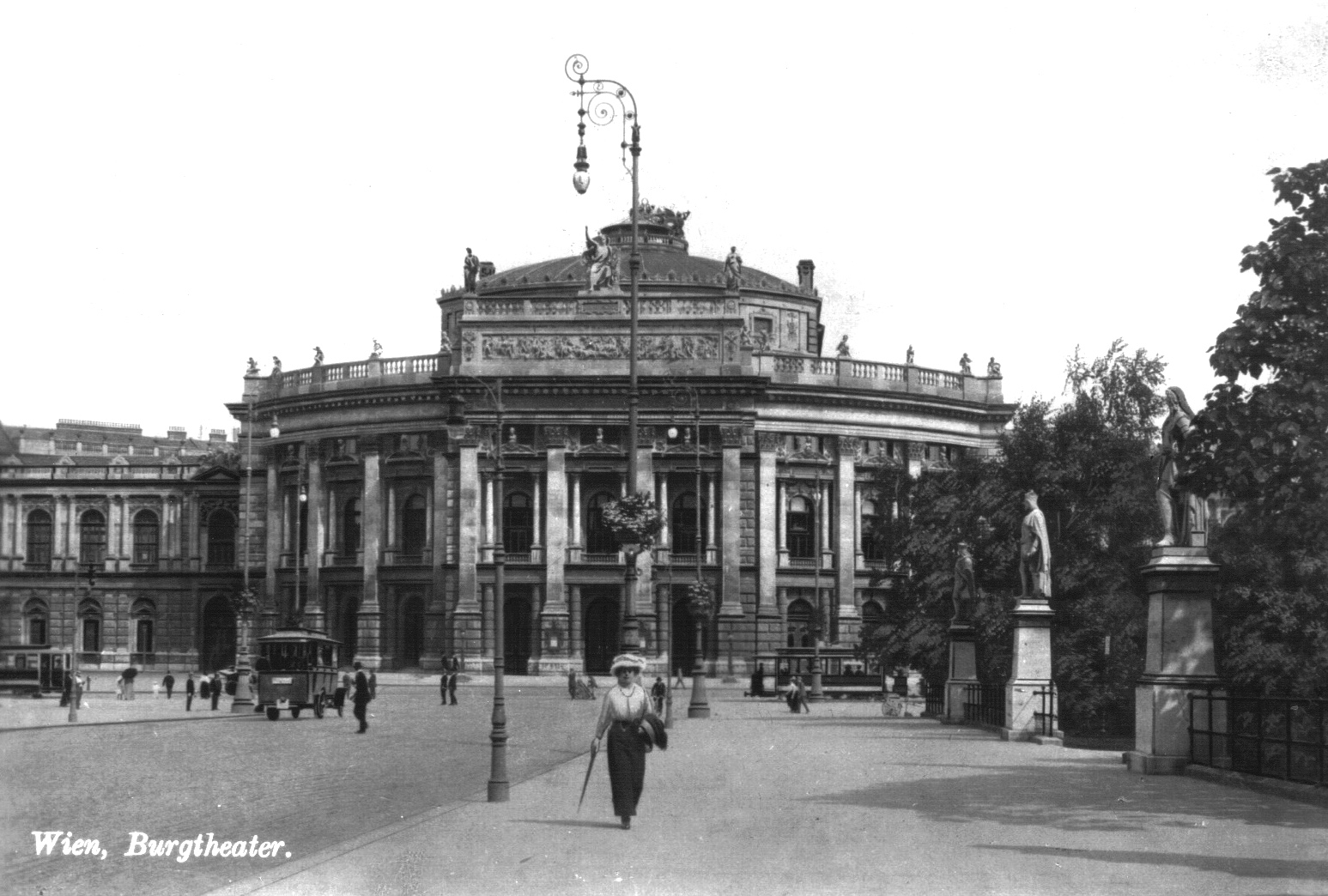
Burgtheater (right after its construction)

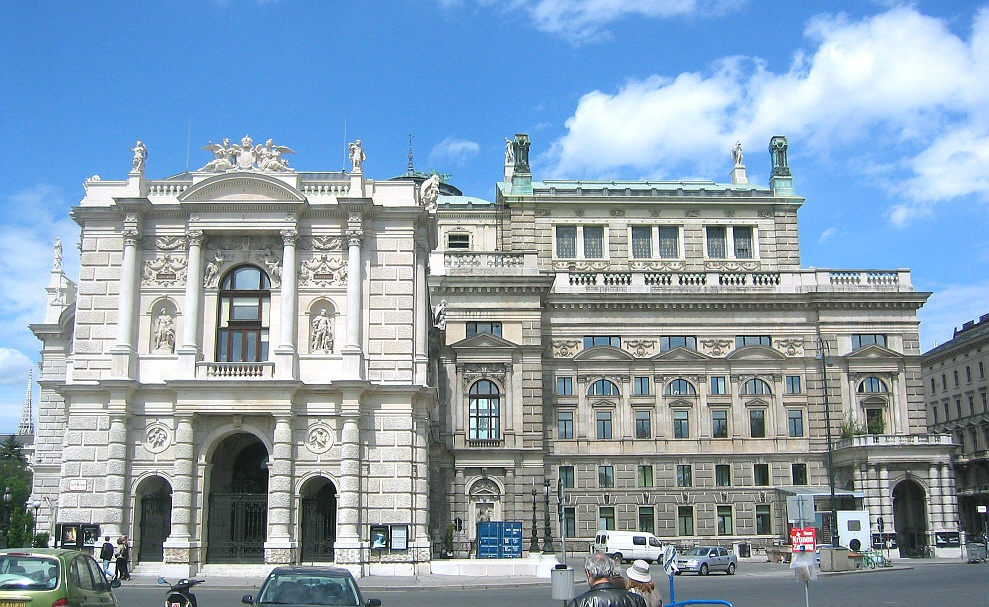
Burgtheater (side)

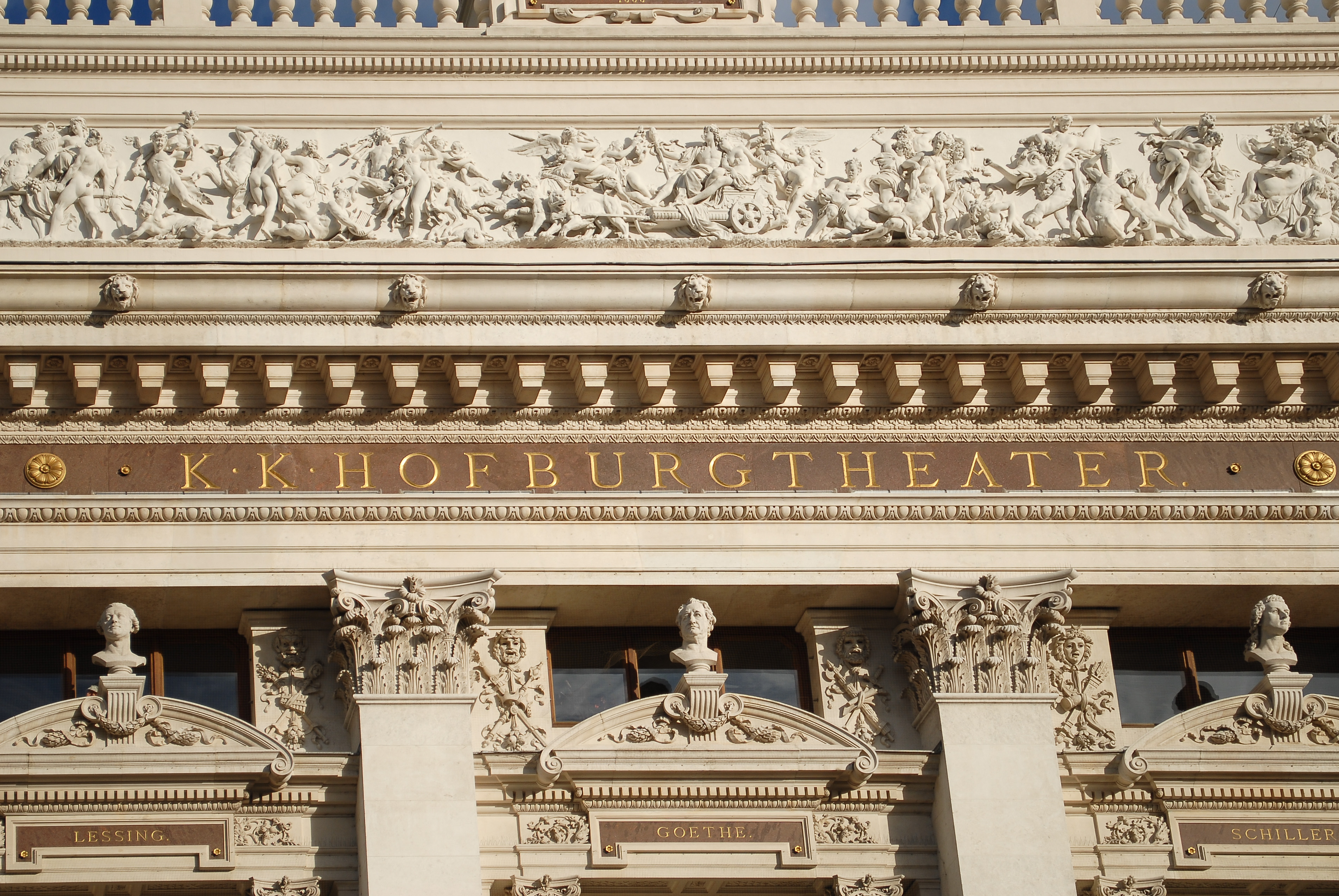
Detail of facade of Burgtheater

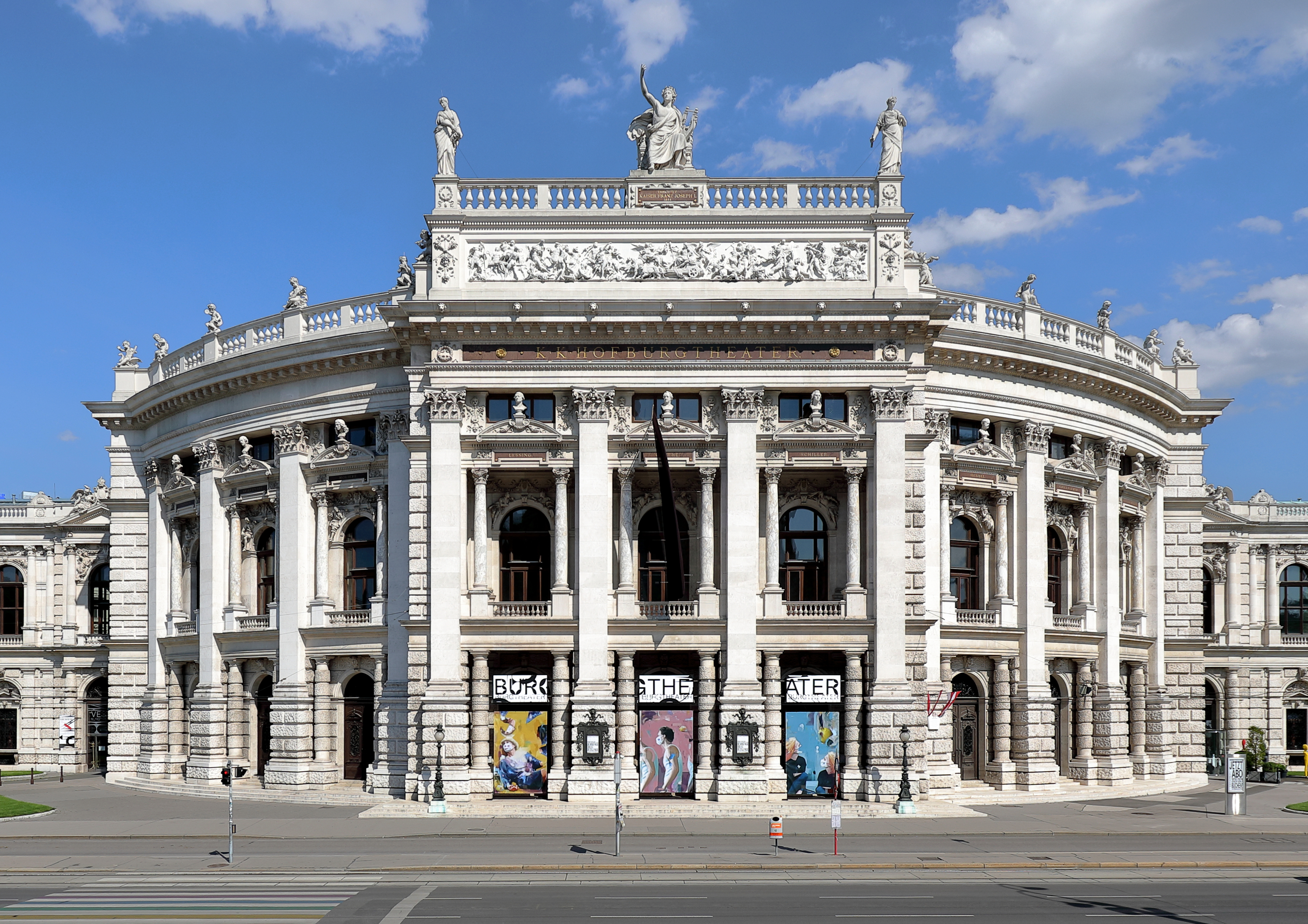
Burgtheater (main entrance)

The original Burgtheater was set up in a tennis court (called a 'ball house' at the time) that the Roman-German king and later emperor Ferdinand I had built in 1540 in the lower pleasure garden of the Hofburg after the old ball house fell victim to a fire in 1525.

The theater opened on 14 March 1741, the creation of the Habsburg Empress Maria Theresa of Austria, who wanted a theater next to her palace. Her son, Emperor Joseph II, called it the "German National Theater" in 1776. Three Mozart operas premiered there: Die Entführung aus dem Serail (1782), Le nozze di Figaro (1786), and Così fan tutte (1790), as well as his Piano Concerto No. 24 in C Minor (1786). Beginning in 1794, the theater was called the "K.K. Hoftheater nächst der Burg". Beethoven's 1st Symphony premiered there on 2 April 1800. The last performance, in October 1888, was of Goethe's Iphigenie auf Tauris. The theatre's small size provided it with exceptional acoustics, but it had long been unable to accommodate its growing audience. In 1884, one description noted that it was "neither remarkable by comfort, nor by elegance. The [auditorium], which is a great deal too small, can hardly contain the half of the spectators who should like to enter."

The theater's first building adjoined the Hofburg at Michaelerplatz, opposite St. Michael's Church. It was moved to a new building at the Ringstraße on 14 October 1888, designed by Gottfried Semper and Karl Freiherr von Hasenauer. The interiors of the new Burgtheater were decorated with frescoes by Gustav Klimt, Ernst Klimt, and Franz von Matsch, depicting theatrical history, from Sophocles's Antigone to Shakespeare's Globe Theatre as well as the drama of Molière.

In 1943, under Nazi rule, a notoriously extreme production of The Merchant of Venice was staged at the Burgtheater—with Werner Krauss as Shylock, one of several theater and film roles by this actor pandering to antisemitic stereotypes.

On 12 March 1945, the Burgtheater was largely destroyed in a United States Air Force bombing raid, and one month later, on 12 April 1945, it was further damaged by a fire of unknown origin. After the war, the theater was rebuilt between 1953 and 1955. The classic Burgtheater style and the Burgtheater-German language were groundbreaking for German-language theater.

== Directors ==
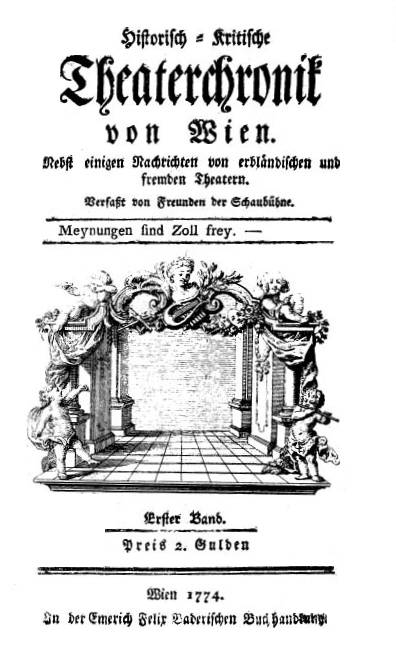

Before 1776, the theater had been leased from the state by Johann Koháry. After encountering financial difficulties in 1773, he convinced Joseph Keglevich to act as curator. The director of the theater, Wenzel Sporck, who was the great nephew of Franz Anton Sporck, who had brought the french horn and Antonio Vivaldi to Prague, established a committee to finance the theater under the chairmanship of Franz Keglevich in 1773, and Karl Keglevich became the director of the Theater am Kärntnertor in 1773. Joseph Keglevich declared the theater bankrupt in 1776 and the state, under Joseph II, took over its operation in 1776. Wenzel Sporck and Franz Keglevich were released from their duties in 1776 and the University of Trnava, whose rector was Alexander Keglevich in the year 1770/71, received permission to move into the Buda Castle. Until 1776, the theater had been financed de facto, but not de jure, by the University of Trnava of the Society of Jesus, which were suppressed by the order of Pope Clement XIV in 1773. Francis II decided on 4 July 1792 to lease the theater again, but could not find a tenant. Finally, Ferdinánd Pálffy became the tenant in 1794, until 1817; his finances originated from the mining institute in Banská Štiavnica, the first technical university in the world.

Name	Start	End
Joint direction by 15–22 senior members (Künstlerrepublik)	1776	1789
Franz Carl Hieronymus Brockmann	1790	1790
Direction by 5 senior members (Regiekollegium)	1790	1794
Peter von Braun	1794	1806
Direction by a group of senior courtiers (initially 8) (Kavaliersdirektion)	1807	1817
Joseph Schreyvogel	1814	1832
Johann Ludwig Deinhardstein	1832	1841
Franz Ignaz von Holbein	1841	1849
Heinrich Laube	1849	1867
Friedrich Halm (pseudonym of Eligius Freiherr von Münch-Bellinghausen)	1867	1868
August Wolff	1868	1870
Franz Freiherr von Dingelstedt	1870	1881
Adolf von Wilbrandt	1881	1887
Adolf von Sonnenthal	1887	1888
August Förster	1888	1889
Adolf von Sonnenthal	1889	1890
Max Burckhard	1890	1898
Paul Schlenther	1898	1910
Alfred Freiherr von Berger	1910	1912
Hugo Thimig	1912	1917
Max von Millenkovich	1917	1918
Joint direction by Hermann Bahr, Max Devrient and Robert Michel (Dreierkollegium)	1918	1918
Albert Heine	1918	1921
Anton Wildgans	1921	1922
Max Paulsen	1922	1923
Franz Herterich	1923	1930
Anton Wildgans	1930	1931
Hermann Röbbeling	1932	1938
Mirko Jelusich	1938	1938
Ulrich Bettac	1938	1939
Lothar Müthel	1939	1945
Raoul Aslan	1945	1948
Erhard Buschbeck	1948	1948
Josef Gielen	1948	1954
Adolf Rott	1954	1959
Ernst Haeusserman	1959	1968
Paul Hoffmann	1968	1971
Gerhard Klingenberg	1971	1976
Achim Benning	1976	1986
Claus Peymann	1986	1999
Klaus Bachler	1999	2009
Matthias Hartmann	2009	2014
Karin Bergmann	2014	2019
Martin Kušej	2019	2024
Stefan Bachmann	2024	

== Theater and renowned actors ==
The Burgtheater remained a strongly traditional stage with a distinct culture until the late 1960s. From the early 1970s on, it became a venue for some of Europe's most important stage directors and designers. With many debut performances of plays written by Thomas Bernhard, Elfriede Jelinek, Peter Handke, Peter Turrini, and George Tabori, Claus Peymann managed to affirm the Burgtheater's reputation as one of Europe's foremost stages.

Among the best known actors in the ensemble of about 120 members are: Sven-Eric Bechtolf, Klaus Maria Brandauer, Kirsten Dene, Andrea Clausen, Karlheinz Hackl, Philipp Hochmair, Robert Meyer, Gertraud Jesserer, August Diehl, Jutta Lampe, Susanne Lothar, Michael Maertens, Tamara Metelka, Birgit Minichmayr, Nicholas Ofczarek, Hedwig Pistorius, Elisabeth Orth, Martin Schwab, Peter Simonischek, Ulrich Tukur, Franz Tscherne, and Gert Voss.

Some famous former members of the ensemble were Max Devrient, Bruno Ganz, Josef Kainz, Josef Lewinsky, Joseph Schreyvogel, Adolf von Sonnenthal, Charlotte Wolter, Ludwig Gabillon, Zerline Gabillon, Attila Hörbiger, Paula Wessely, Curd Jürgens, O. W. Fischer, Paul Hörbiger, Otto Tausig, Peter Weck, Fritz Muliar, Christoph Waltz, Ignaz Kirchner, and Gert Voss. Particularly deserving artists may be designated honorable members. Their names are engraved in marble at the bottom end of the ceremonial stairs at the side of the theater facing the Volksgarten. Members of honor include: Annemarie Düringer, Wolfgang Gasser, Heinrich Schweiger, Gusti Wolf, Klaus Maria Brandauer, and Michael Heltau.

The Burgtheater has seen productions staged by directors like Otto Schenk, Peter Hall, Giorgio Strehler, Luca Ronconi, Hans Neuenfels, Terry Hands, Jonathan Miller, Peter Zadek, Paulus Manker, Luc Bondy, Christoph Schlingensief, and Thomas Vinterberg. Among the staged and costume designers were Fritz Wotruba, Luciano Damiani, Pier Luigi Pizzi, Ezio Frigerio, Franca Squarciapino, Josef Svoboda, Anselm Kiefer, Moidele Bickel, and Milena Canonero.

Notable performances include the world premiere of Des Feux dans la Nuit in 1999, whose choreography was done by Marie Chouinard.

== See also ==
- Akademietheater
- Maria Anna Trancart
- Raimund Theater
- Theater in der Josefstadt
- Volkstheater Wien
