= Franz Tscherne =

Austrian actor and film director (born 1964)

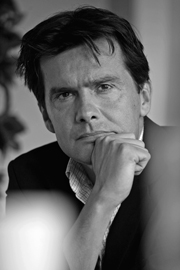
- Franz Tscherne, 25 September 2007 (picture by Helmut Seuffert)
- Born: 3 December 1964 (age 61); Graz, Austria

Franz Tscherne (born 3 December 1964 in Graz) is an Austrian actor and film director.

He has been on the stage of major and renowned theaters in Switzerland, Germany and Austria such as Zurich, Basel, Düsseldorf, Stuttgart, Frankfurt, Berlin, Munich and Vienna since the age of 19, playing many important parts of his genre from Shakespeare, Goethe, Molière and Goldoni to Horvath and Schnitzler under directors as famous as August Everding, Hans Hollmann, Hellmuth Matiasek, Rudolf Noelte, Robert Lepage and Leander Haußmann.

Apart from his stage performances, Franz Tscherne has worked in numerous film and TV productions, including Radetzky March by Axel Corti, Inspector Rex and since recently he has devoted himself also increasingly to musical theater playing, inter alia, the part of Perchik in the musical Fiddler on the Roof directed by Stefan Soltesz at the Aalto Theatre in Essen. With the Munich Philharmonic he was the narrator in the concert performance of Lortzing’s opera Tsar and Carpenter conducted by Leopold Hager and under maestro Marcello Viotti he recited Dante in Wolf Ferrari’s La vita nuova. For the Bavarian Broadcasting Corporation he was the speaker in Honegger’s The Dance of the Dead under the musical direction of Ulf Schirmer. Under the same conductor he was assigned the role of Rilke’s Cornet as set to music by Viktor Ullmann at Munich’s Prinzregententheater in December 2007.

Tscherne gave his debut on the opera stage in 2003 in Venice in a new production of Ariadne auf Naxos by the Teatro la Fenice. Under the musical direction of maestro Viotti, he played with great success the major domo at Teatro Malibran. He will play this role also in February 2009 at the Teatro Carlo Felice. His most recent parts included the role of Orpheus in the melodrama Orfey i Evridike by J.I. Fomin directed by Klaus Peter Kehr at the Wuppertal Opera and the role of Niklas in Heinrich Marschner’s opera Hans Heilig at the Opera National du Rhin in Strasbourg.
