= Resetarits =

Resetarits is a surname. Notable people with the surname include:

- Karin Resetarits, meanwhile Karin Kraml (born 1961), Austrian journalist and Member of the European Parliament
- Lukas Resetarits (born 1947), Austrian cabaret artist and actor
- Thomas Resetarits (1939–2022), Austrian sculptor
- Willi Resetarits (1948–2022), Austrian singer, comedian, and human rights activist
