= Franz Fuchs =

Austrian domestic terrorist (1949–2000)

- Fuchs during his trial
- Born: 12 December 1949; Gralla, Styria, Austria
- Died: 26 February 2000 (aged 50); Graz-Karlau Prison, Graz, Styria, Austria
- Cause of death: Suicide by hanging
- Other name: The Austrian Unabomber
- Known for: Sending 5 waves of letter bombs from December 1993 till December 1995
- Status: Deceased
- Motive: Xenophobia
- Convictions: Murder (4 counts); Attempted murder
- Penalty: Life imprisonment

Details
- Date: 4 February 1995
- Span of crimes: 1993–1995
- Country: Austria
- Killed: 4
- Injured: 15
- Weapon: Improvised explosive devices
- Date apprehended: 1 October 1997

Franz Fuchs (12 December 1949 – 26 February 2000) was an Austrian domestic terrorist and mass murderer who killed four people and injured 15, some seriously, using three improvised explosive devices and 24 mail bombs, which he sent in five waves between 1993 and 1997.

Criminal psychologists characterized Fuchs as a highly intelligent but socially inept loner. He was motivated by extreme xenophobia and targeted people he considered to be foreigners, or organizations and individuals who he believed were "friendly to foreigners".

== Mail bombs and improvised explosive devices ==
In December 1993 he started his first wave of mailbombs. Early victims were the priest August Janisch (because of his help for refugees), Silvana Meixner (ORF journalist for minorities), and the Mayor of Vienna, Helmut Zilk, who lost a large part of his left hand in the explosion. Other mailbombs which were discovered and neutralized were targeted at Helmut Schüller (humanitarian organisation Caritas), the Green politicians Madeleine Petrovic and Terezija Stoisits, Wolfgang Gombocz and Minister Johanna Dohnal.

While attempting to disarm an improvised explosive device found at a bilingual school in Carinthia, police officer Theo Kelz lost both his hands on 24 August 1994. (Kelz subsequently became the first Austrian to receive a double hand transplant, and made an impressive recovery.)

Franz Fuchs claimed responsibility for his attacks in a letter to the foreign minister of Slovenia in September 1994, in the name of the "Salzburger Eidgenossenschaft – Bajuwarische Befreiungsarmee" (Bavarian Liberation Army). In a number of subsequent letters, he tried to give the impression of a larger organisation with different units. However, from the second wave of mailbombs in October 1994 not a single one went off.

=== Oberwart attack on Roma ===
On 5 February 1995, four Romani men, Josef Simon (40), Karl Horvath (21), Erwin Horvath (18), and Peter Sarközi (18), were killed in Oberwart with a pipe bomb improvised explosive device which was attached to a sign that read "Roma zurück nach Indien" ("Romani back to India"). It was the worst racial terror attack in post-war Austria, and was Fuchs's first and only fatal attack. The bomb was set to explode at chest-height when someone touched the placard with the message.

The next day in nearby Stinatz, mainly populated by Austrians of Croatian descent, a bomb with a pamphlet "Go back to Dalmatia" wounded a garbage worker.

Between June 1995 and December 1995 he sent three more waves of mailbombs. Wave number three was targeted at TV host Arabella Kiesbauer, Dietrich Szameit (vice-mayor of Lübeck) and a dating agency. Kiesbauer and Szameit did not open their letters themselves and were not hurt. Wave number four was targeted at two medics and a refugee aid worker, Maria Loley. One medic from Syria and Maria Loley were injured; the other mailbomb, targeted at a South Korean medic, was discovered and neutralized. Two mailbombs of wave number five detonated early in mailboxes, the remaining two were discovered and neutralized. This was the last incident before Fuchs was arrested.

== Arrest, trial and death ==
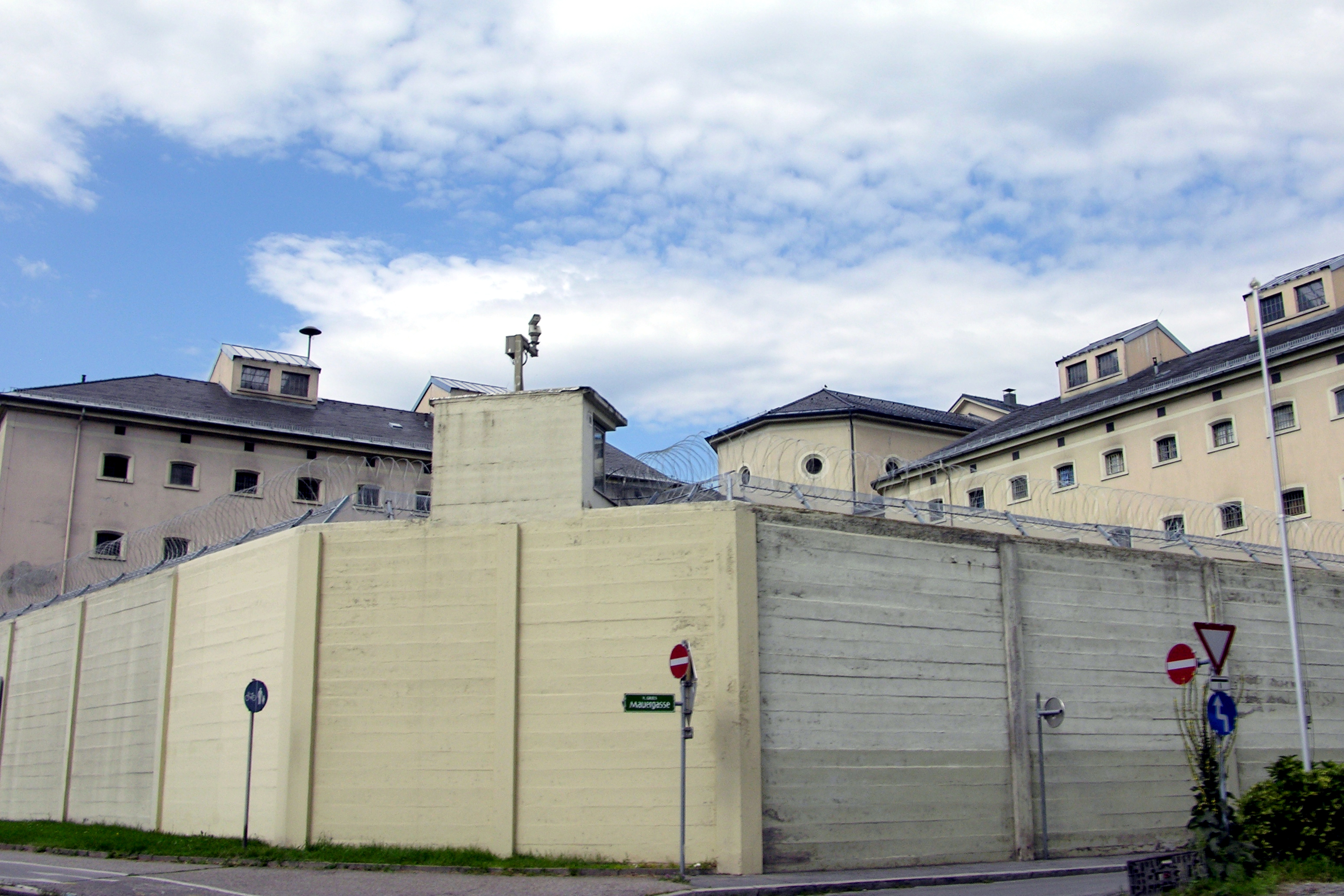
Graz-Karlau Prison

At this stage Fuchs had become highly paranoid. On 1 October 1997 near his residence in Gralla, he followed two women in a car who he believed were observing him. When police attempted to question him on what they believed was a routine case of stalking, he produced another improvised explosive device which he had kept in his car, and detonated it in his hands in front of the policemen. He survived his suicide attempt, but he lost both hands, and also injured a nearby police officer. Fuchs was arrested without giving further resistance and, after a trial which many in Austria felt had fallen short of making all attempts to uncover deep details, was sentenced to life in prison on 10 March 1999. Through his unruly behavior during the trial, Fuchs had repeatedly forced his removal from court proceedings.

On 26 February 2000, Fuchs was found hanged with the cable of his electric razor in his prison cell at Graz-Karlau Prison. The prison physician determined his death to be a suicide.

== Media ==
- In 2007, the criminal case was portrayed in the docudrama Franz Fuchs – Ein Patriot, the role of Franz Fuchs was played by Austrian Karl Markovics.
- In the computer games Hitman: Codename 47 and Hitman: Contracts, the character Frantz Fuchs appears to be based on Franz. Frantz is an Austrian terrorist, who served in Hitlerjugend as a youngster, and is planning to blow up a hotel at which a U.N. peace summit is being held.
