= Thomas Resetarits =

Austrian sculptor (1939–2022)

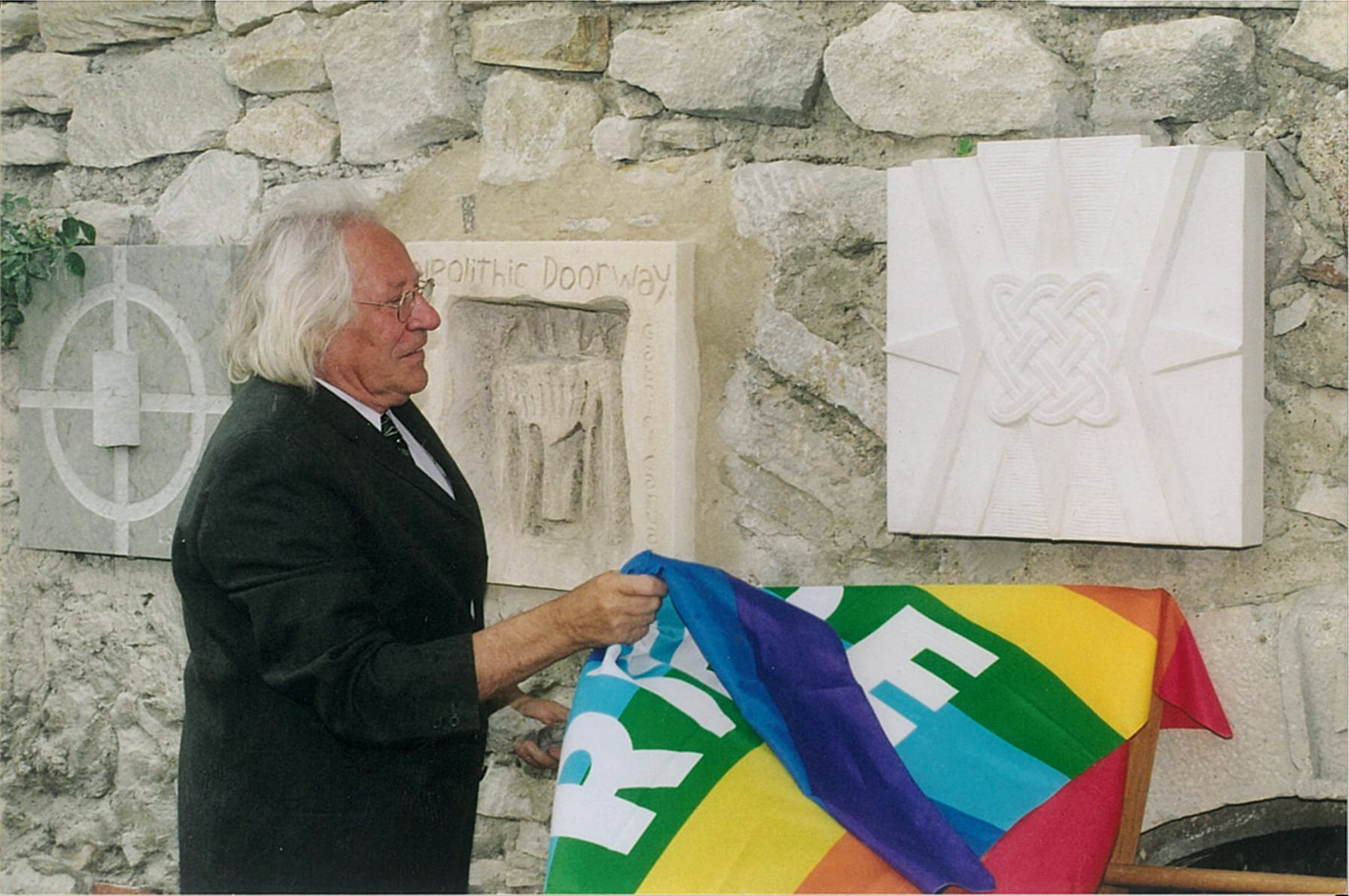
- Resetarits unveiling his Burgenlandkroaten, 2003
- Born: Tome Rešetarić; 25 November 1939; Stinatz, Burgenland, Austria, Germany
- Died: 18 May 2022 (aged 82); Wörterberg, Burgenland, Austria
- Occupation: Sculptor

Thomas Resetarits (born Tome Rešetarić, 25 November 1939 – 18 May 2022) was an Austrian sculptor, who created art in public spaces, especially in and around churches, including the Eisenstadt Cathedral.

== Life ==
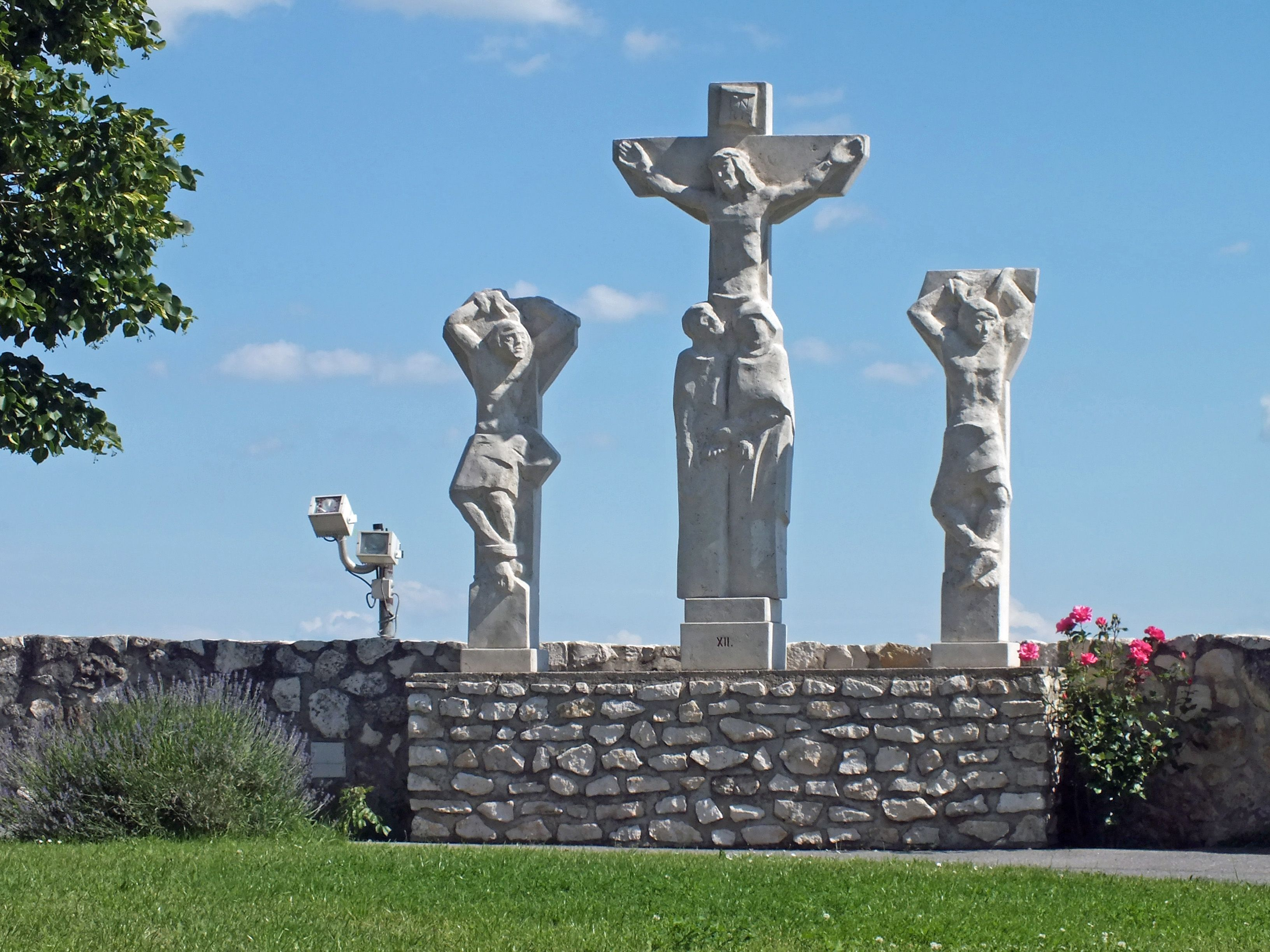
Stations of the Cross, Donnerskirchen

Tome Rešetarić was born in Stinatz, Austria, the son of Franjo and Justina Tome Rešetarić, who belonged to the Croatian minority in Burgenland. He began carving wood sculptures as a school pupil. He trained to be a stonemason in Graz from 1955, completing his training in 1957. He worked in Vienna and later for a stone industry firm in Salzburg. In 1964, he passed the master's examination in Vienna. He studied from 1965 at the Akademie der bildenden Künste Wien.

Resetarits married elementary school teacher Herta Flasch in 1966 and began working as a freelance sculptor. He travelled to Rome, Hungary, Croatia, Germany, Mexico, the U.S., India, New Guinea, South America, South Africa, and China to gain inspiration for his work. He became a member of the association Friedhof und Denkmal (cemetery and monument) in Kassel.

Resetarits worked mostly in stone, wood, and bronze. From 1970, he received many commissions from the Diocese of Eisenstadt to design altars, altar areas, and Stations of the Cross. From 1974 to 1976, he also worked as an instructor in a prison in Eisenstadt. He created Kontakt, a tall bronze sculpture, for a panoramic rest area near Bernstein on the Burgenland Straße (B 50) in 1987. In addition, he designed stained glass windows from 1990, received commissions for public spaces, and worked as a book illustrator.

Resetarits lived and worked in Wörterberg, Burgenland. He died at the age of 82 after a prolonged illness.

== Works in public space ==
- 1971: Altar relief (oak), Glashütten, Burgenland
- 1974: Altar area (marble), Stegersbach parish church, Burgenland
- 1976: Altar area, Krankenhauskapelle in Güssing, Burgenland
- 1980: Virgin of Mercy, portal of the Eisenstadt Cathedral, Burgenland
- 1981: Flügelaltar (linden), Oberschützen, Burgenland
- 1983: 15 Stations of the Cross, Woppendorf, Burgenland
- 1984: Friedensstein (Peace Stone), 1.6 m memorial stele, Mogersdorf, Burgenland
- 1985: Bronze door, Eisenstadt Cathedral
- 1986: Altar and Stations of the Cross, Bad Tatzmannsdorf
- 1987: Kontakt (bronze), rest area Bernstein, B 50
- 1988: Triptychon, Kanonikerhaus in Eisenstadt, Burgenland
- 1990: Altar area, Filialkirche Sulz im Burgenland
- 1991: Altar area (cherry wood), Pinkafeld parish church, Burgenland
- 1994: Stations of the Cross (limestone), Donnerskirchen, Burgenland
- 1996: Stations of the Cross (granite), Kegalberg next to Pfarrkirche Rohrbach bei Mattersburg, Burgenland
- 1996: Altar area (wood), Schwarzenbach, Lower Austria
- 1999: Altar area (marble), Heiligenkreuz, Lower Austria
- 2000: Altar area (serpentinit), Badersdorf
- 2003: Stations of the Cross (wood), Neudorf, Burgenland
- 2003: Europabrunnen, 6th Europa-Symposium Kaisersteinbruch, Bruckneudorf
- 2007: Altar area, Rust, Burgenland, Burgenland

=== Gallery ===
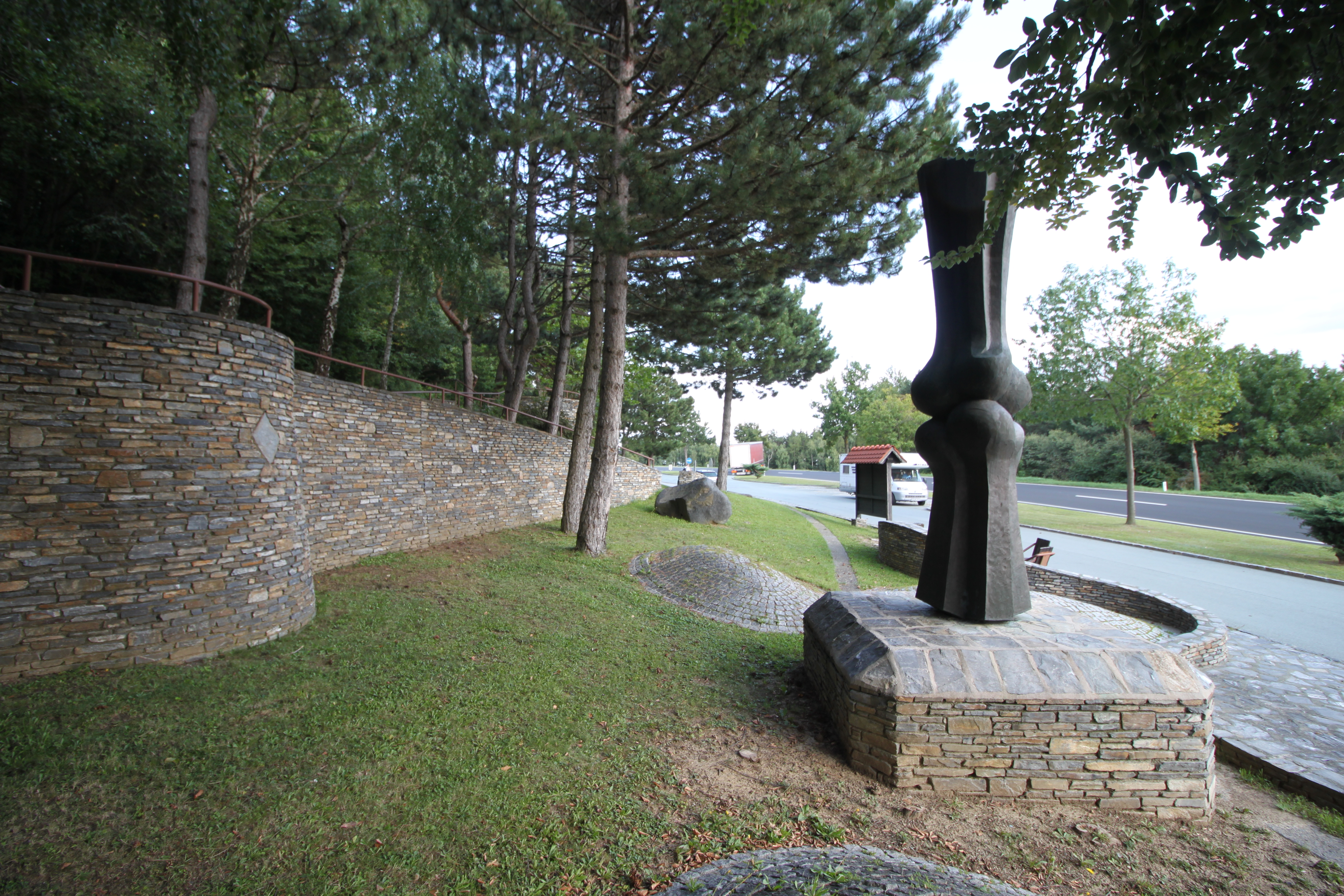
Kontakt at Bernstein panoramic rest area, B 50

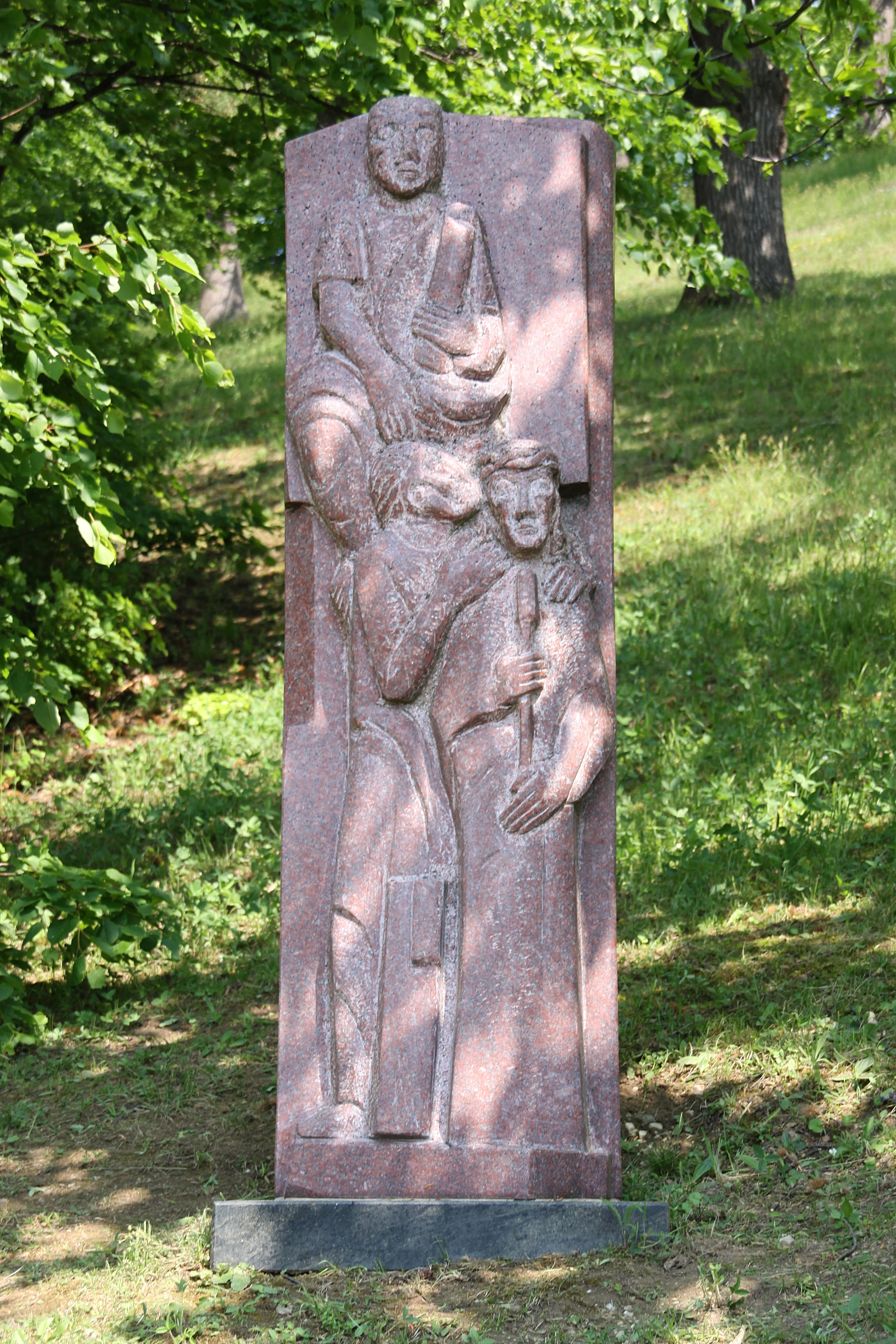
Stations of the Cross, Kegalberg in Rohrbach bei Mattersburg

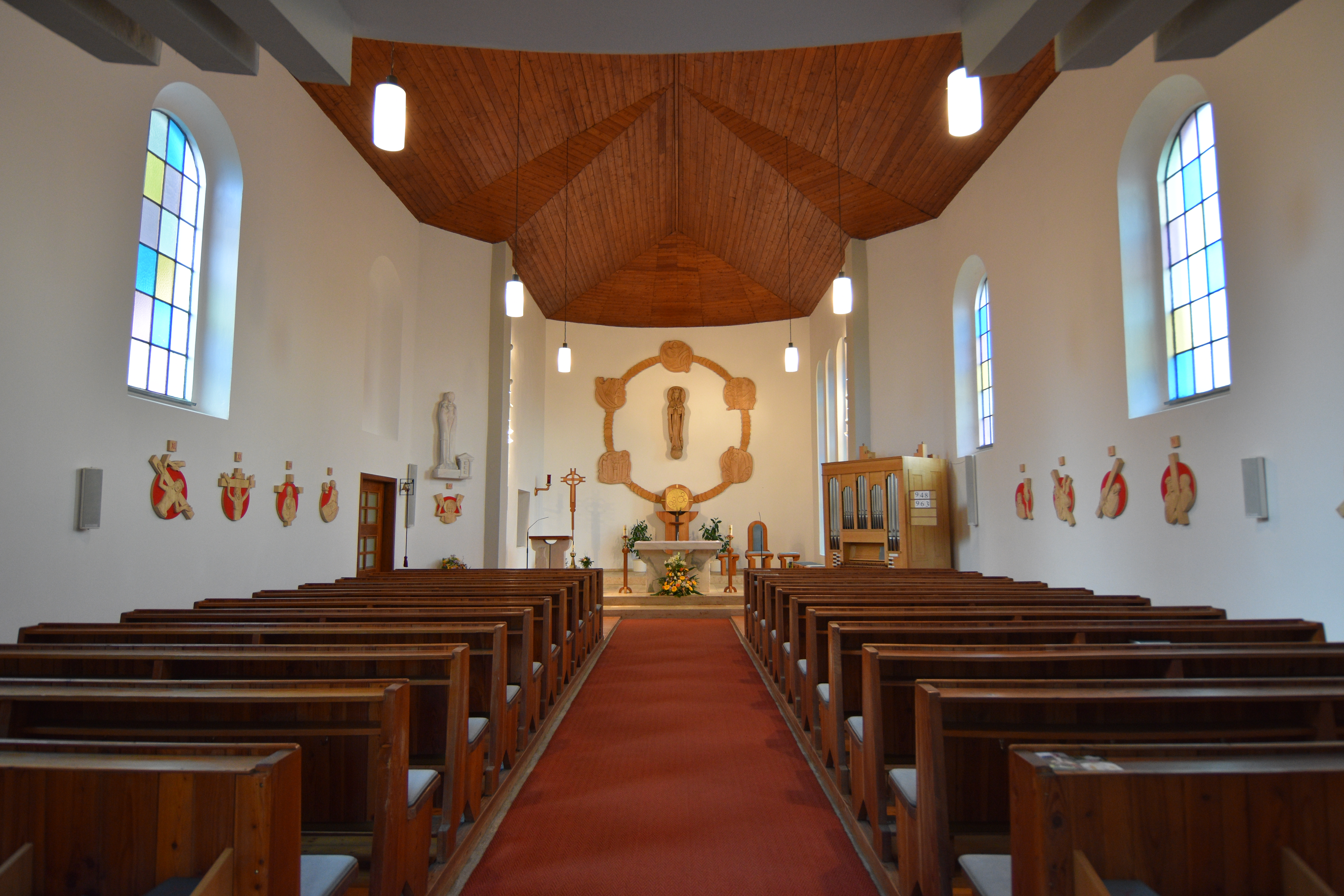
Altar and Stations of the Cross in Sulz

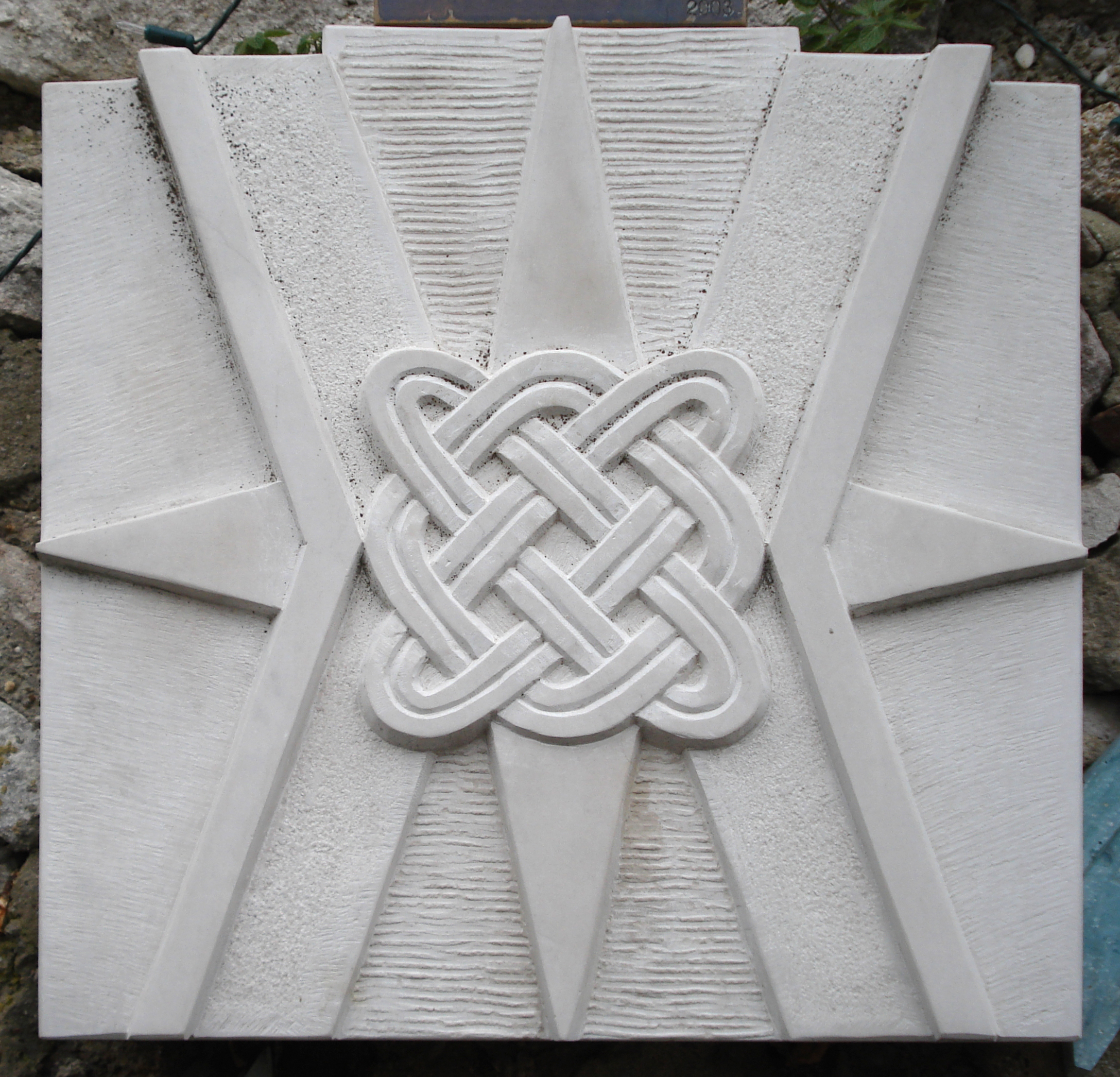
Stone relief for "Burgenlandkroaten" in Kaisersteinbruch

== Exhibitions ==
- 2001: Solo exhibition, Kulturzentrum Oberschützen
- 2004: Kunstachse Oberschützen, Burgenland
- 2010: Landesgalerie Burgenland

== Book illustrations ==
- 1977:
- 1983: Weihnachten ist jeden Tag, Dr. J. Frank, Morsak Verlag, ISBN 978-3-87553-213-5
- 1988:
- 1990: Du bleibst bei uns. Ein Kreuzweg, Josef Dirnbeck, ISBN 978-3-7022-1743-3
- 2003: Die Sandalen des Moses, Alfons Jestl, publication PNº1 (Bibliothek der Provinz Weitra), ISBN 3-85252-551-9
- 2007: Die Fee im Kirschbaum (drawings), Alfons Jestl, publication PNº1 (Bibliothek der Provinz Weitra), ISBN 978-3-85252-746-8
