= Terezija Stoisits =

Austrian politician (born 1958)

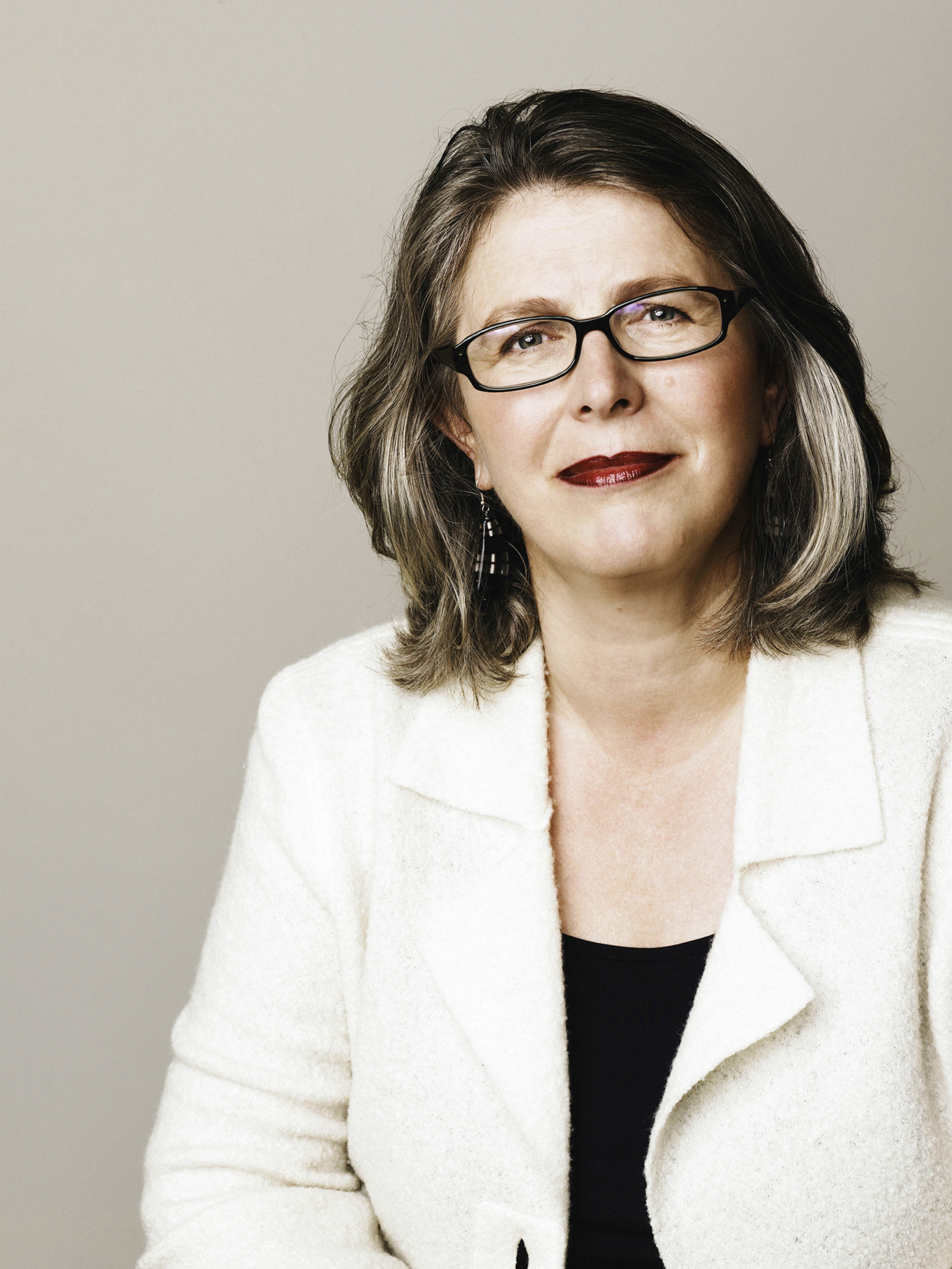
Terezija Stoisits, 2006

Terezija Stoisits (pronounced [ˈtɛrɛzija ˈstɔjʃitɕ]; born 14 November 1958 in Stinatz, Austria) is an Austrian politician of the Green Party. She served as an ombudswoman of the Republic of Austria 2007–2013. Before that she was the longest serving member of parliament of her party.

== Education and profession ==
Stoisits went to high school in Güssing and concluded her maturity exam in 1977. She studied law at the University Vienna, graduating with a master's degree in 1985. Thereafter she completed a one-year judiciary internship and was then employed at the Ministry of Education, Arts and Sports.

== Political career ==
On 5 November 1990 Stoisits was sworn in as member of the National Council of Austria. From 1992 to 1996 she was member of the federal board of trustees of her party, representing the so-called 10th state, i.e. ethnic groups and minorities. In the parliament Stoisits served as spokeswoman of her party - mainly for minorities, human rights, migration and justiciary - and actively took part in several committees, including interior affairs, armed services and culture. From 1999 to 2002 she chaired the Austrian Parliamentary Committee for Human Rights. Stoisits was a member of the Austrian delegation to the Parliamentary Assembly of the Council of Europe (in 2000) and of the Austria Convent (deliberating from 2003 to 2005 about a state reform). She was elected to the Board of the National Fund of the Republic of Austria for Victims of National Socialism and the Versöhnungsfond, an Austrian fund for the compensation of forced labourers during the Nazi regime.

On 30 June 2007 she left the National Council, taking over the function of Ombudswoman of the Republic of Austria the next day. Stoisits is the first representative of The Greens elected in this position.

As a member of parliament Stoisits often addressed issues neglected, ignored or opposed by other parties. She used to start her parliament speeches always with the Croatian phrase: "Dobar dan, poštovane dame i gospodo" ("Have a good day, Ladies and Gentlemen!"), which angered some members of the nationalistic FPÖ and regularly caused uproar.

Whenever somebody states that I am emotional: Yes, I am. But I am also persistent.

— Terezija Stoisits, on her political style

In December 1993 Terezija Stoisits was the target of a letter bomb by Franz Fuchs, who was motivated by racism and xenophobia. As the bomb was detected in time, it did not explode.

Stoisits is living in a longterm partnership with Bruno Aigner, the speaker of Austria's president Heinz Fischer. Together they have a son, Philipp Andreas.

Since December 2019, she is Head of the executive board of the Vienna Wiesenthal Institute for Holocaust Studies (VWI).

== Award ==
- 2008 Weltmenschpreis
