= Karin Kraml =

Austrian journalist and politician

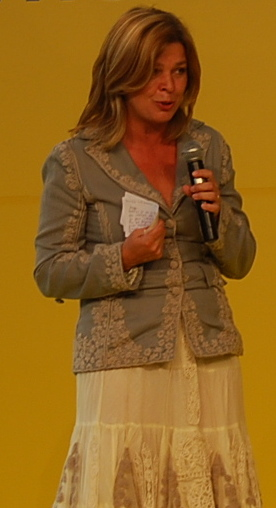
Karin Kraml, 2008

Karin Kraml (née Müller; born 15 December 1961) is an Austrian journalist and politician. She was a member of the European Parliament from 2004 until 2009. At the time, her surname was Resetarits.

== Early and personal life ==
Kraml was born in Vienna. From 1978 to 1979 she participated in AFS youth exchange and attended senior high school in Huntington on Long Island, Suffolk County, New York for one year. In 1980 she finished grammar school in Austria with honors.

Kraml was married to Peter Resetarits, prominent ORF host and brother of singer Willi Resetarits and actor Lukas Resetarits. She has five children. In 2010 she married producer Martin Kraml.

== Journalistic career ==
She started her journalistic career at the Austrian Broadcasting Corporation (ORF) as editor in the culture department, and became host of the news show Zeit im Bild and the culture show Treffpunkt Kultur. From 2003 to 2004 she worked as host of a daily radio talk show for the commercial Austrian radio station Krone Hitradio.

Her 2002 book entitled Ja, ich koche gerne! (Yes, I like to cook!) contains a number of recipes, and with 20 short stories on her life and family turns out to be a rather autobiographical work.

== Political career ==
In 2004 she became a member of the European Parliament with Hans-Peter Martin's List. In December 2004, she declared her opposition to the implementation of software patents.

Following strong disagreements with Martin, she joined the Liberal Group in the European Parliament on 7 June 2005. She subsequently also joined the Liberal Forum.

On 21 August 2008 she was announced as the LIF's leading candidate in Salzburg for the 2008 Austrian legislative election, and as its European Union spokesperson. The LIF failed to gain any representation in the National Council at the 2008 election.
