= Willi Resetarits =

Austrian singer and human rights activist (1948–2022)

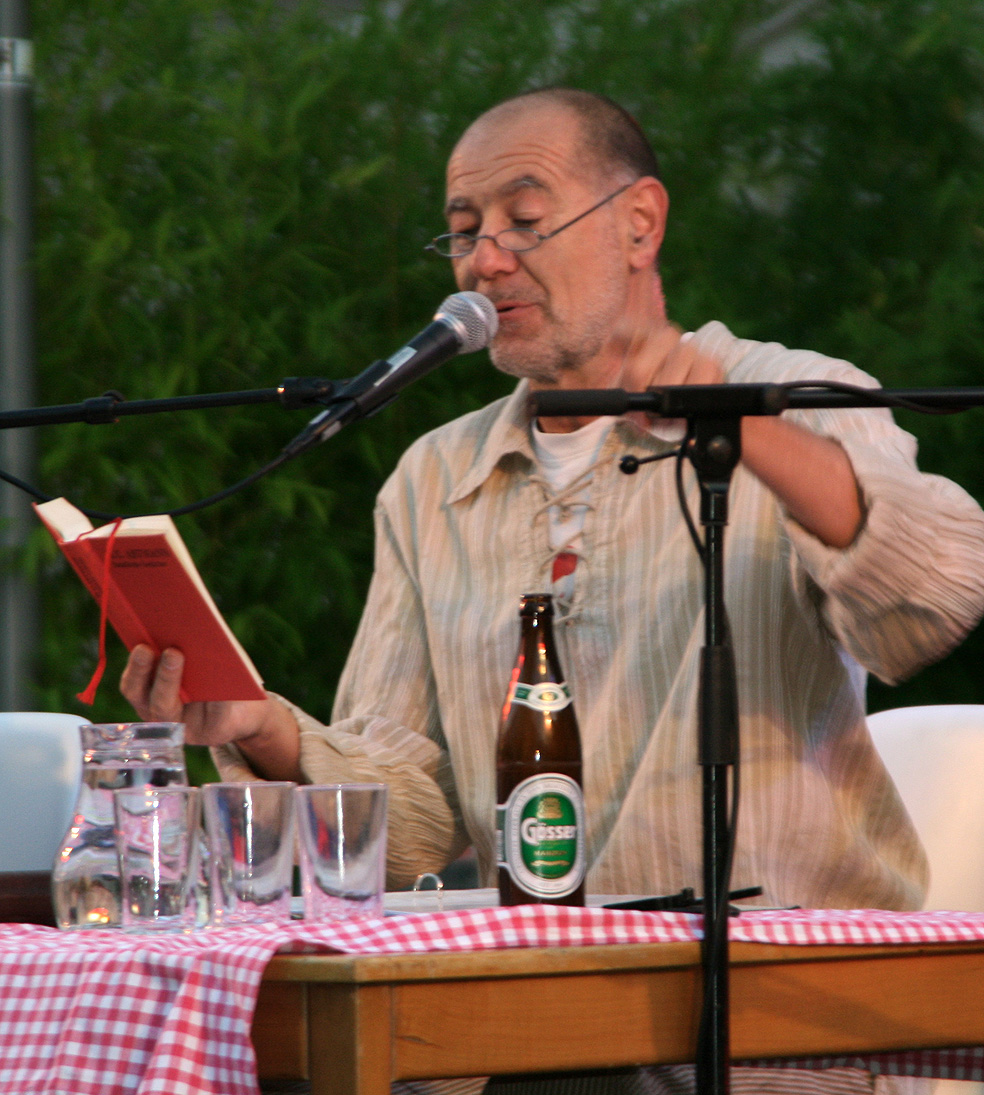
- Willi Resetarits in Vienna, 2007
- Born: Wilhelm Resetarits; 21 December 1948; Stinatz, Allied-occupied Austria
- Died: 24 April 2022 (aged 73); Vienna, Austria
- Occupations: Singer, comedian, human rights activist
- Awards: Austrian Decoration for Science and Art; Amadeus Austrian Music Award

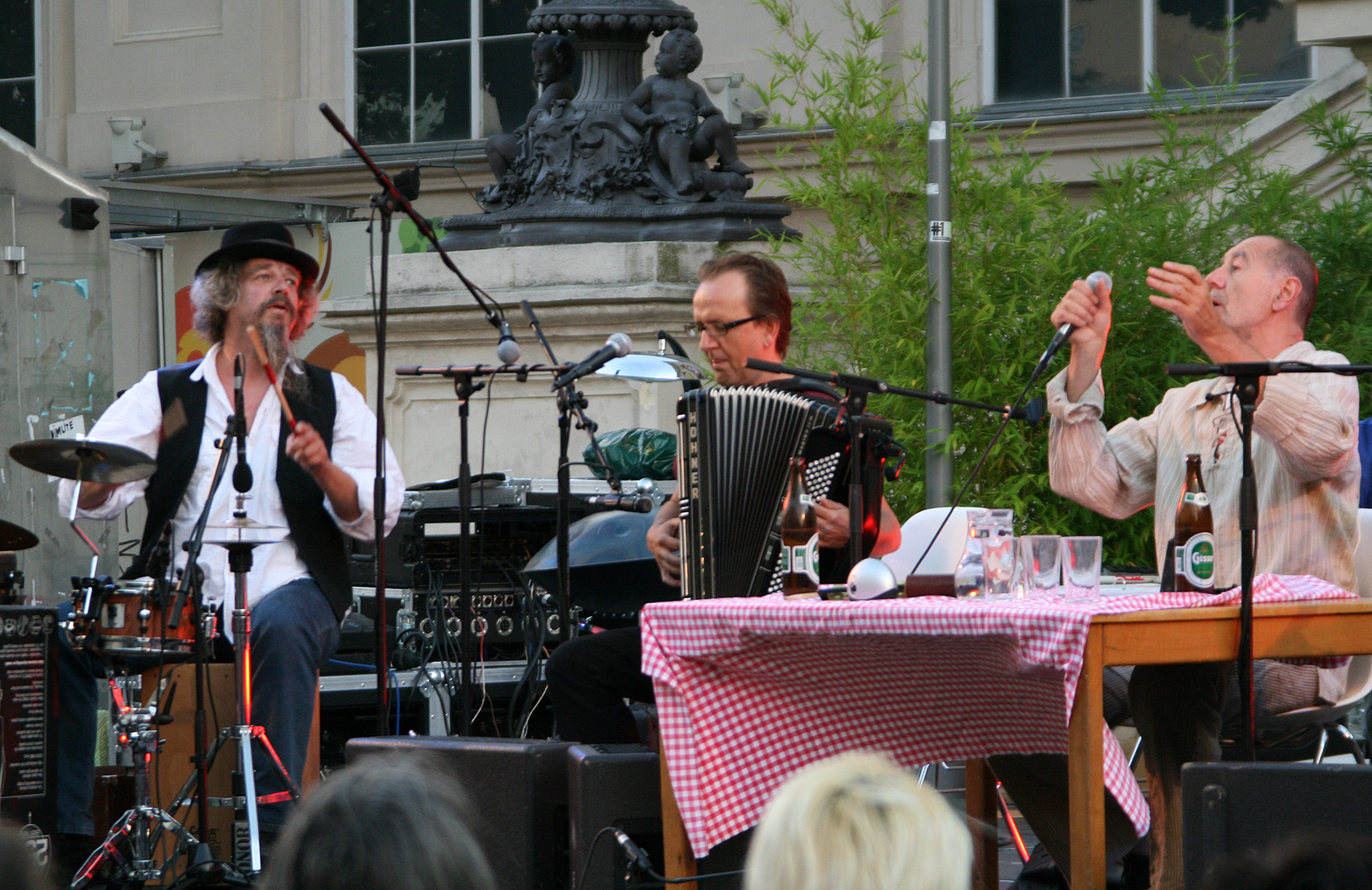
Stubnblues (MQ 2007)

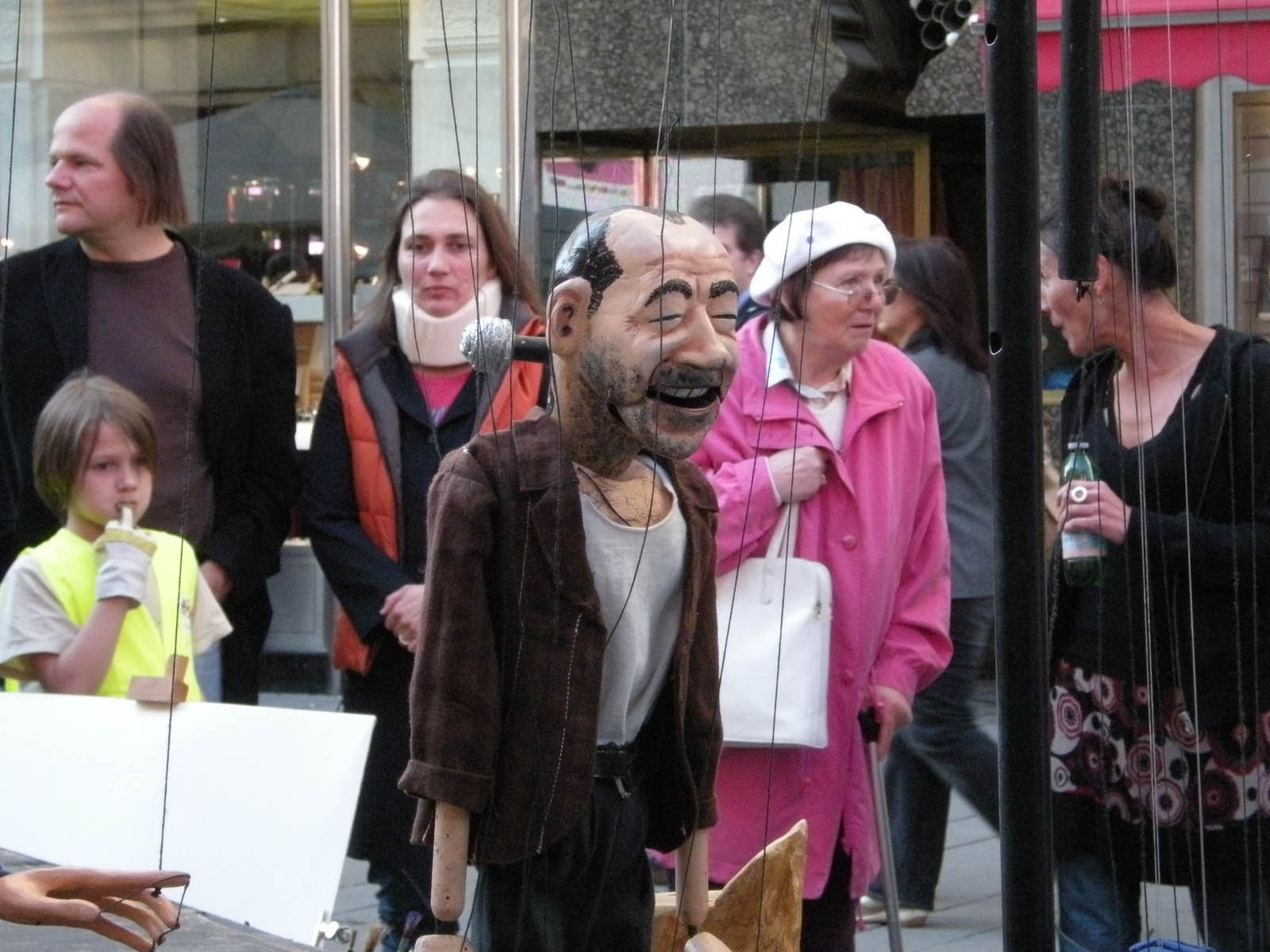
"Dr. Kurt Ostbahn, singer in retreat". Marionette by Karin Schäfer.

Wilhelm Resetarits (21 December 1948 – 24 April 2022), better known as Willi Resetarits and Ostbahn Kurti, was an Austrian folk and early Austropop singer, actor-comedian and human rights activist.

== Biography ==
Resetarits was born in Stinatz in the Austrian state of Burgenland. His family moved to Vienna when he was three. He studied sports and English studies intending to become a teacher, but his successful career as a musician intervened.

In 1969 Resetarits joined the political rock band Schmetterlinge (Butterflies). They participated in the Eurovision Song Contest 1977 in London with the song "Boom-Boom-Boomerang", which reached the 17th and next-to-last place in Eurovision voting.

In the mid-1980s, together with his colleague Günter Brödl he developed his alter ego Dr. Kurt Ostbahn, an excessive personality with an intense stage presence, which turned out to be very successful. The name was created in the mid-1970s, when Günter Brödl was asked during a radio show what American musicians like Southside Johnny & the Asbury Jukes would call themselves if they were from Vienna. He answered Ostbahn Kurti & die Chefpartie, which a decade later became the name of Willi Resetarits and his band. Resetarits also introduced the musical form of Favorit'n'Blues, a Viennese form of rhythm and blues. After Günter Brödl died unexpectedly in 2000, Dr. Kurt Ostbahn went on a final commemoration tour and then announced in December 2003 that he would let his alter ego retire.

However, after the "official" retirement of Dr. Kurt Ostbahn after the last concert on 31 December 2003, there were 4 other appearances as Dr. Kurt Ostbahn: 10 and 11 October 2010 - initially announced as CD box presentation - two memorial concerts around the 10th anniversary of Brödls death. On 27 and 28 August 2011, celebrating the 20th anniversary of the infamous "Ostbahn XI" open-air concert. In all four concerts, Resetarits/Ostbahn was joined on stage by a selection of musicians from his two bands, "Chefpartie" and "Kombo". From 1995 to 1998, Trost und Rat von und mit Dr. Kurt Ostbahn (Solace and advice by and with Kurt Ostbahn, Ph.D.) was a very popular weekly radio show in Vienna, verifying Resetarits as an extraordinary entertainer. The broadcast's fame carried on, featuring Willi Resetarits instead of Dr. Kurt Ostbahn in 2006.

Even after the retirement of his alter ego Ostbahn Kurti/Dr. Kurt Ostbahn, Resetarits was very successful with very different music productions. In 2006 he was on tour with the Kurdish singer Sivan Perwer presenting World music and together with the Xtra Combo Resetarits interpreted a wild mixture of Croatian Folk music, Wienerlieder (traditional Viennese ballads), Jazz and Blues as Stubnblues.

Resetarits was a human rights activist and one of the founders of the humanitarian organisations Asyl in Not and SOS Mitmensch. He was also one of the founders and chairman of the Integration House Vienna.

He has made frequent appearances on Austrian TV and in film productions.

Lukas Resetarits (cabaret artist and actor on TV) and Peter Resetarits (TV host at ORF) are his brothers. Karin Resetarits, a former member of the European Parliament, is Peter 's ex-wife and was Willi's sister-in-law.

== Awards ==
- 1996: Nestroy-Ring
- 1997: Bruno Kreisky Award for Human Rights
- 2000: Josef-Felder-Prize für Gemeinwohl und Zivilcourage (Germany)
- 2003: Karl Renner-Prize

== Discography ==
- Schdean "Star [in Viennese dialect] (2021), with Ernst Molden, Walter Soyka, H. Wirth
