= Stinatz =

- Municipality
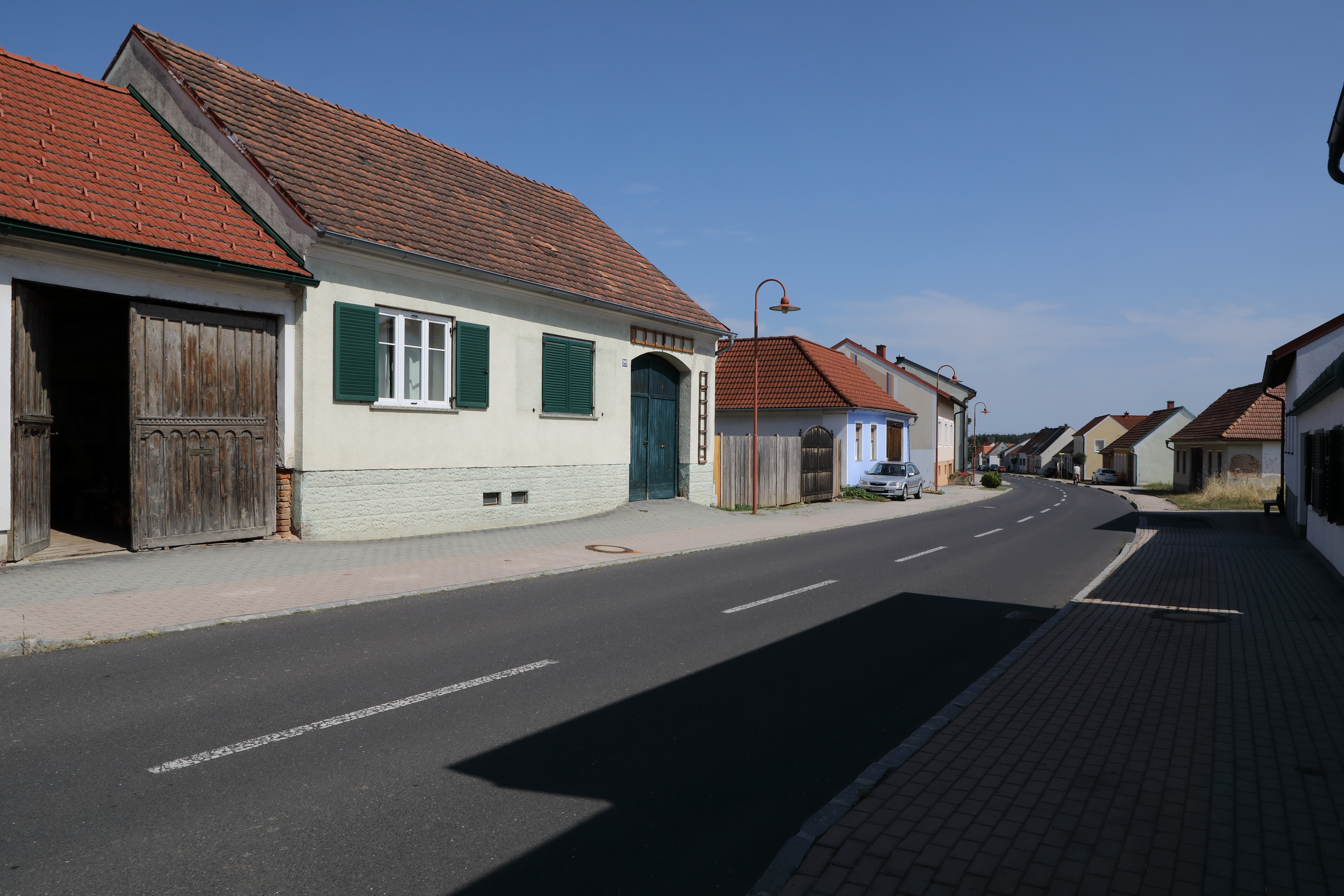
- Stinaz, main road

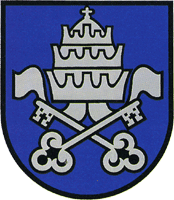
- Coat of arms

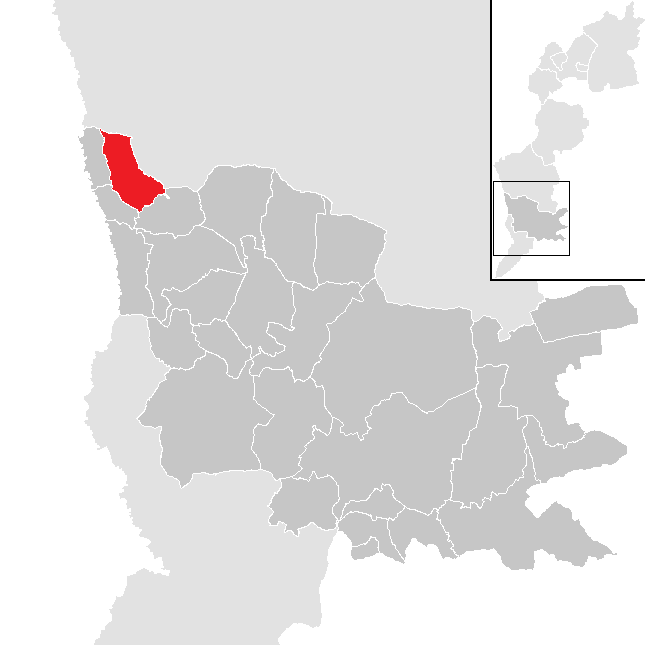
- Location within Güssing district

- Location within Austria Stinatz (Austria)
- Coordinates: 47°12′14″N 16°8′0″E
- Country: Austria
- State: Burgenland
- District: Güssing

Government
  - Mayor: Andreas Grandits (ÖVP)

Area
  - Total: 9.5 km^{2} (3.7 sq mi)

Population (2018-01-01)
  - Total: 1,263
  - Density: 130/km^{2} (340/sq mi)
- Time zone: UTC+1 (CET)
  - Summer (DST): UTC+2 (CEST)
- Postal code: 7552
- Website: www.stinatz.at

Stinatz (Croatian: Stinjaki, Hungarian: Pásztorháza) is a town in the district of Güssing in Burgenland in Austria. According to the last census 62% of the population are members of the Burgenland Croat minority.

== Geography ==
The town lies in the district of Guessing in the south of Burgenland and is composed of two urban districts, Stinatz and Stinatz-Nord. The neighboring towns are Ollerdorf, Hackerberg, Litzelsdorf and Wörterberg.

== History ==
Due to the Ottoman Wars in the 15th century, many Croatian families emigrated to this area and founded their own town. Stinatz was first mentioned in a document in the year 1577. Like the whole Burgenland area, Stinatz belonged to Hungary until 1921. Due to a change in the Hungarian law and policy in 1889, the town, originally named Stinjaki, was given the Hungarian name Stinacs. The town belongs since 1921 to the new founded Burgenland.

The Croat inhabitants of Stinatz speak the Southern Chakavian dialect.

== Population ==
Historical population
| Year | Pop. | ±% |
|---|---|---|
| 1869 | 940 | — |
| 1880 | 1,106 | +17.7% |
| 1890 | 1,181 | +6.8% |
| 1900 | 1,176 | −0.4% |
| 1910 | 1,232 | +4.8% |
| 1923 | 1,086 | −11.9% |
| 1934 | 1,238 | +14.0% |
| 1939 | 1,130 | −8.7% |
| 1951 | 1,204 | +6.5% |
| 1961 | 1,239 | +2.9% |
| 1971 | 1,311 | +5.8% |
| 1981 | 1,329 | +1.4% |
| 1991 | 1,480 | +11.4% |
| 2001 | 1,409 | −4.8% |
| 2011 | 1,353 | −4.0% |

== Politics ==
In the year 2009, the long-time mayor Alfred Grandits (SPÖ) had to retire because of serious health problems. The next election will be in January 2010. In the meantime Andreas Grandits (ÖVP) acts in place of Alfred Grandits. After the last elections the SPÖ has 10 mandate and the ÖVP has 9 mandate. Although the town has about 1400 citizen, there are many teenagers interested in politics and therefore there are many events arranged by the Social Youth and the JVP.

== Educational institutions ==
Due to the quantity of children, the town has its own preschool and elementary school. Although the amount of births declined during the last years, the school has enough children, because there are many immigrants in the town.

== Associations and events ==
There are many clubs in the town like the, football club, musical society, tennis club, Stinjacko

Kolo and the Naturfreunde. All these clubs have their own events.

== Folkways ==
The town is characterized by its Croatian origin, in particular the colorful local costume (Stinatzer Tracht) and the huge weddings, where there is a lot of singing and dancing.

== Sport ==
- ASKÖ Stinjaki, football club of Burgenland Croats

== Personalities ==
- Marijana Grandits, politician
- Ferdinand Grandits, politician
- Ernst A. Grandits, TV host on 3 Sat
- Thomas Resetarits, sculptor
- Lukas Resetarits, cabaret artist
- Willi Resetarits, musician, alias Kurt Ostbahn
- Terezija Stoisits, politician
- Thomas Stipsits, cabaret artist

== Gallery ==
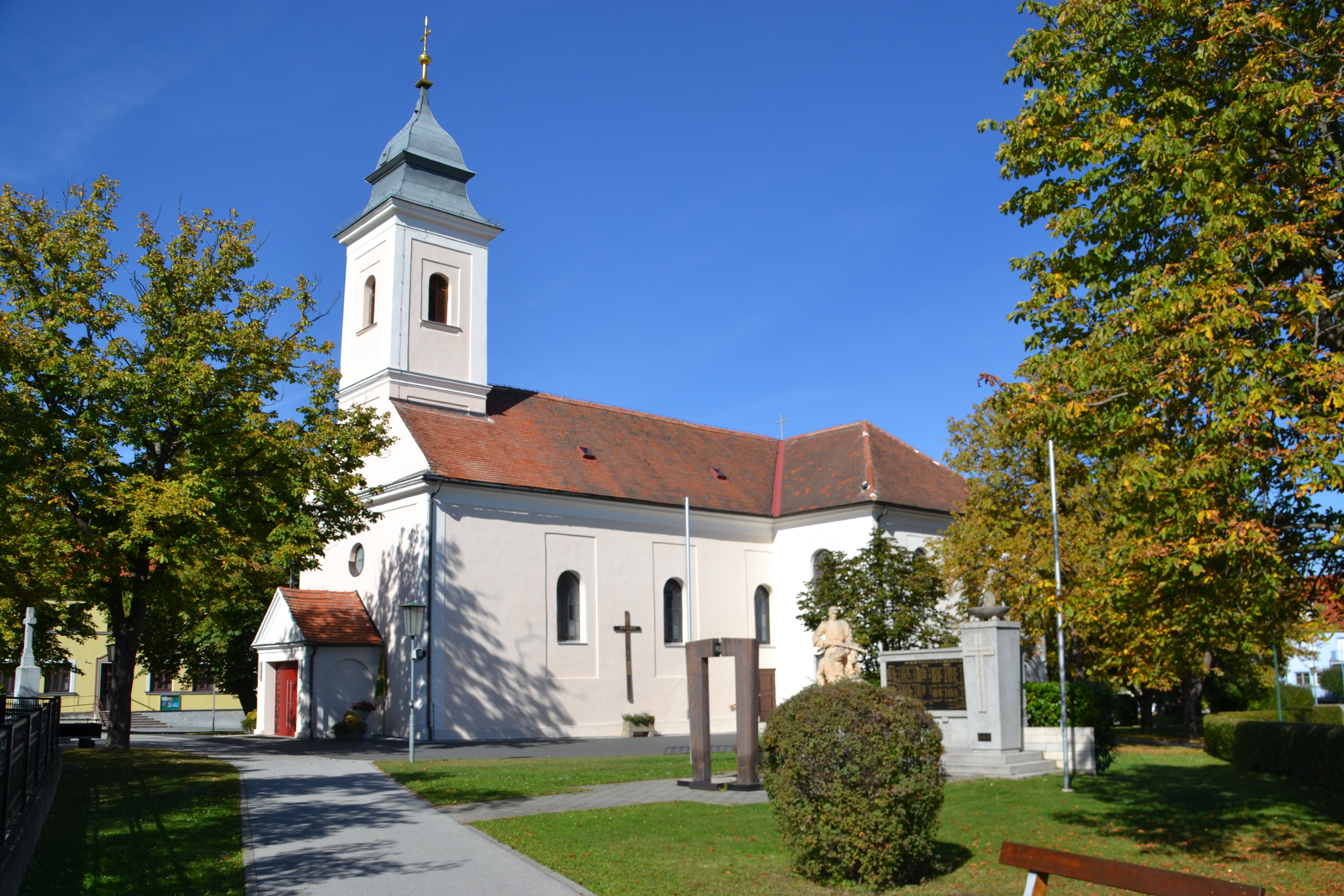
Roman Catholic parish church

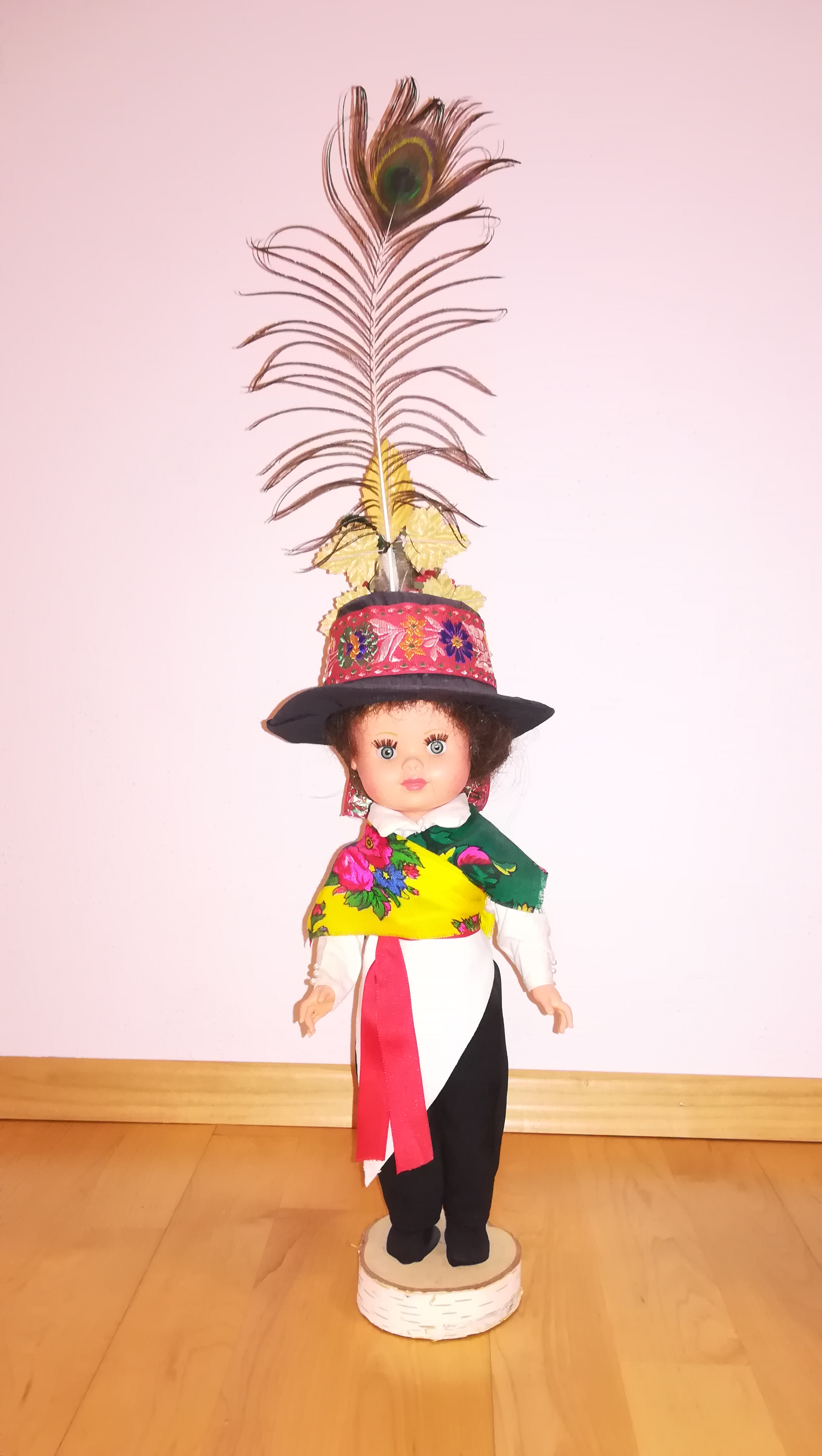
Festive costume for men in Stinatz

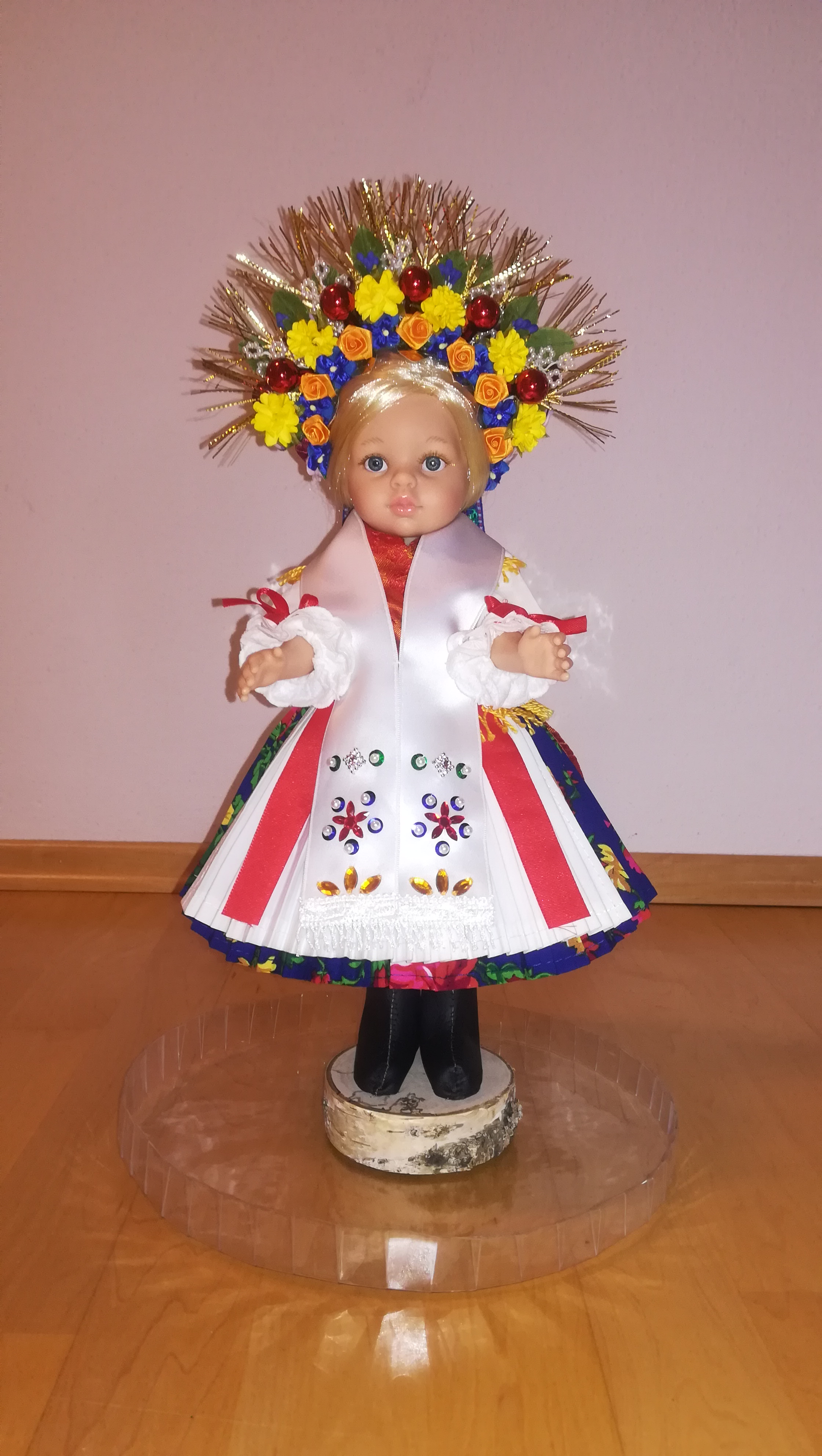
Festive costume for woman

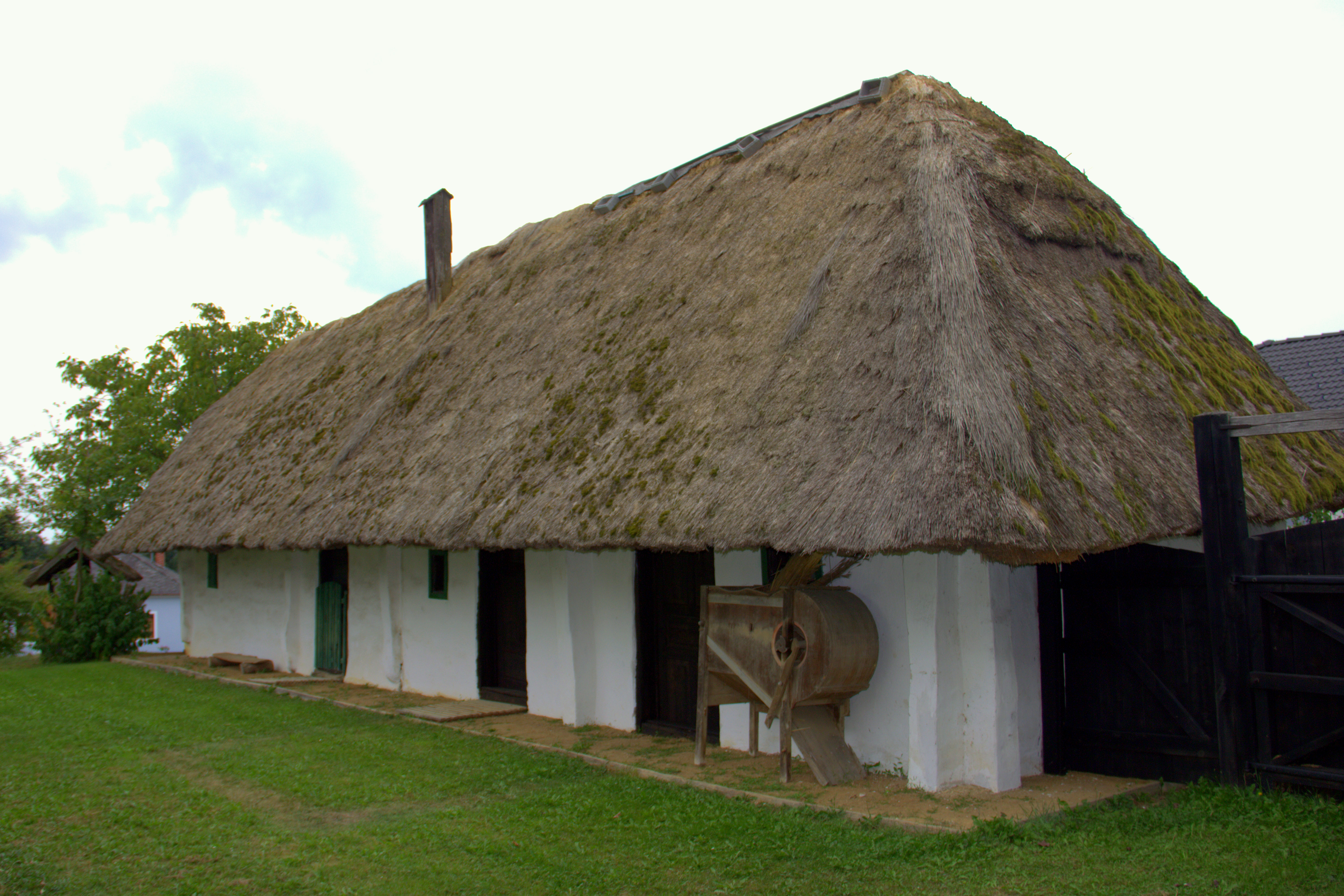
Local History Museum

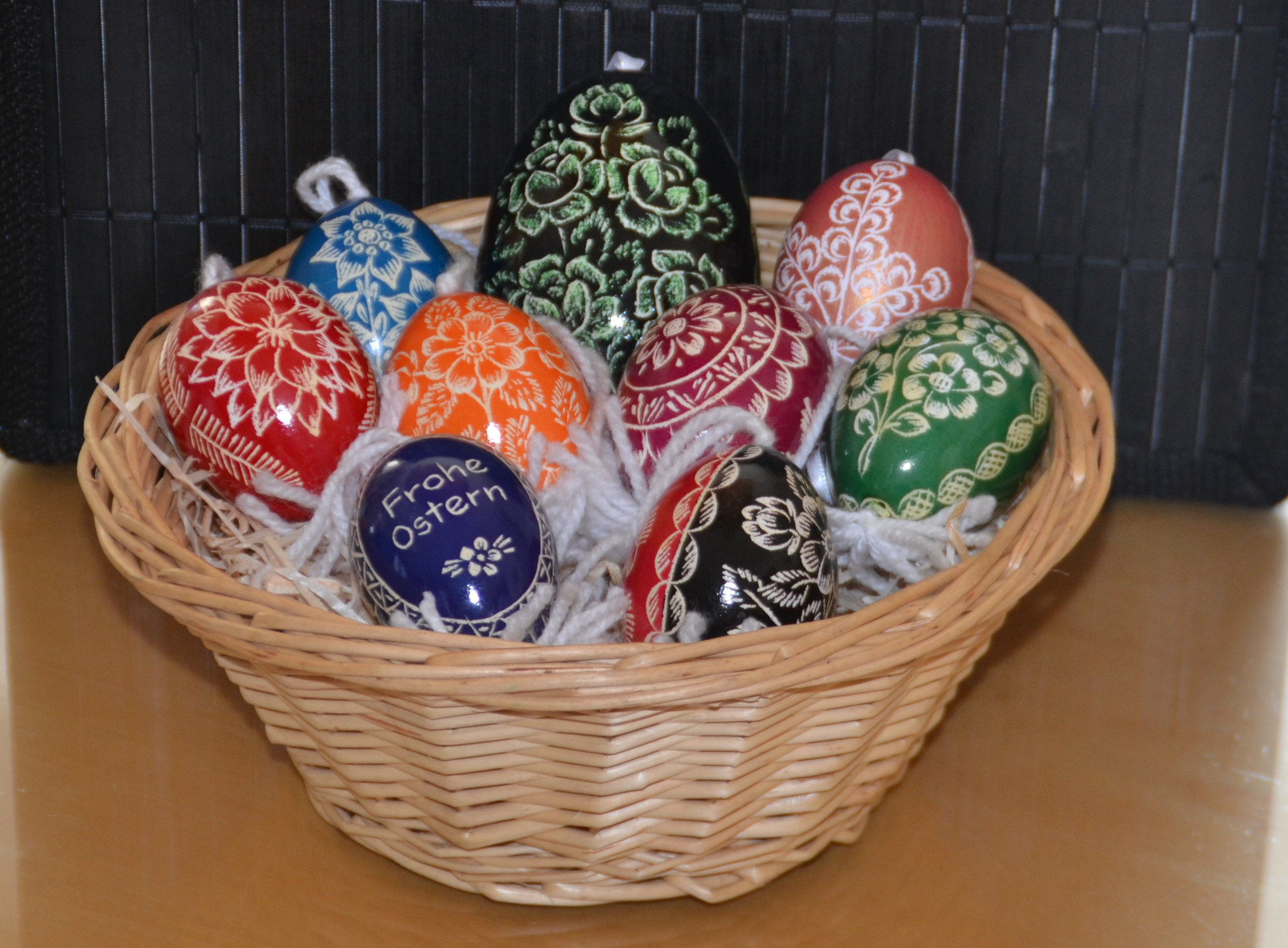
Traditional Easter eggs from Stinatz

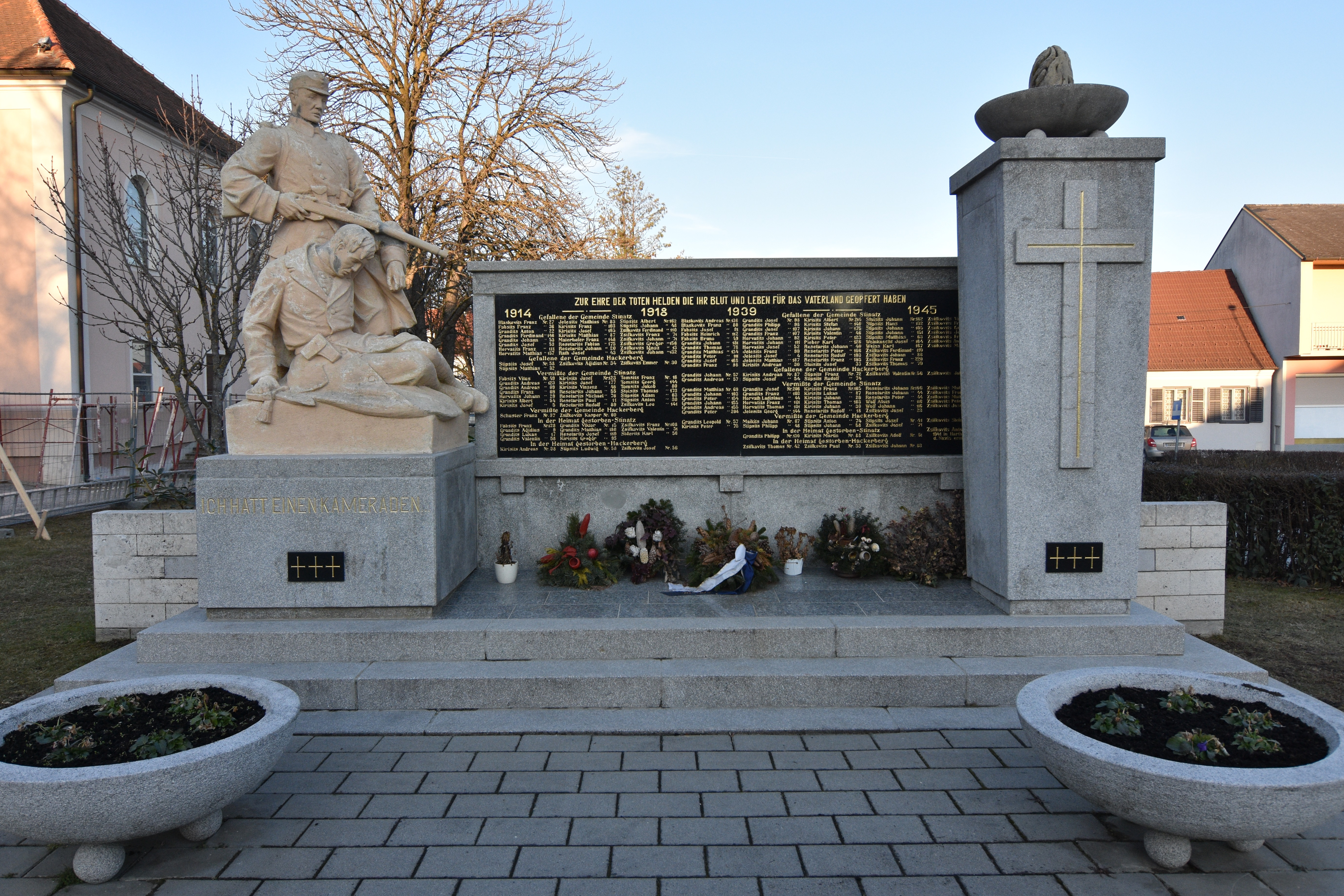
The War Memorial located just next to the church

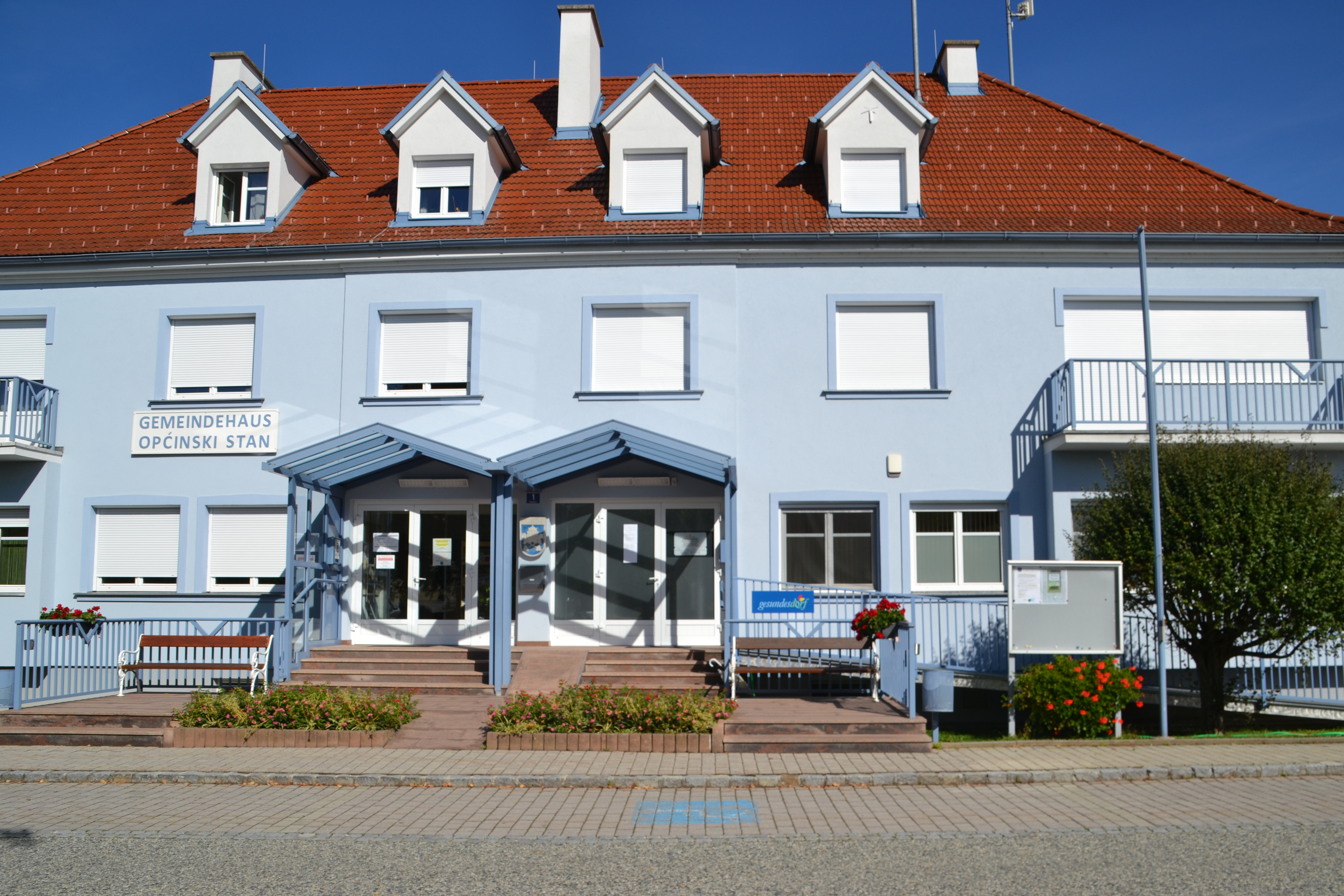
The town hall with bilingual signs

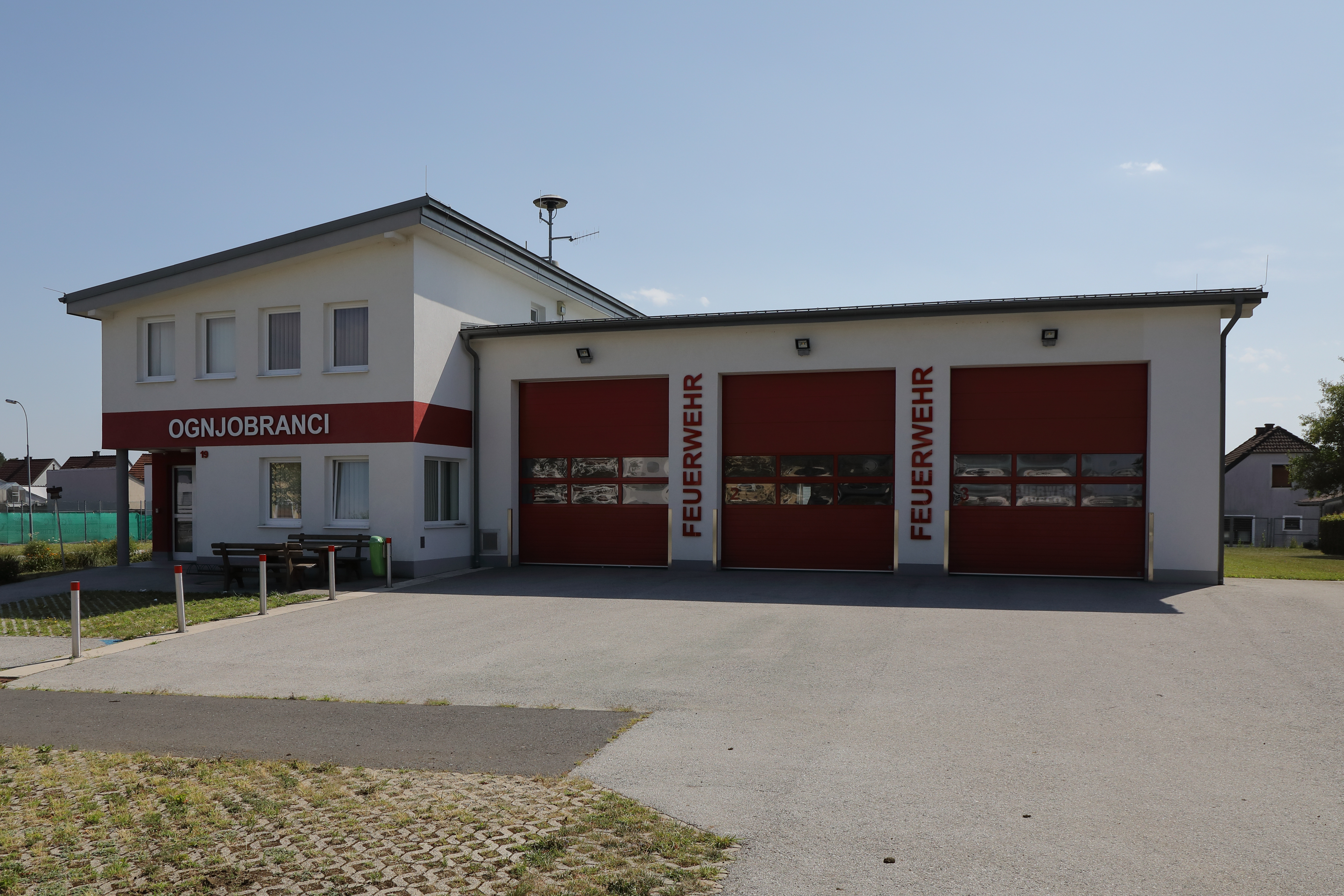
Fire station
