= Wörterberg =

- Municipality
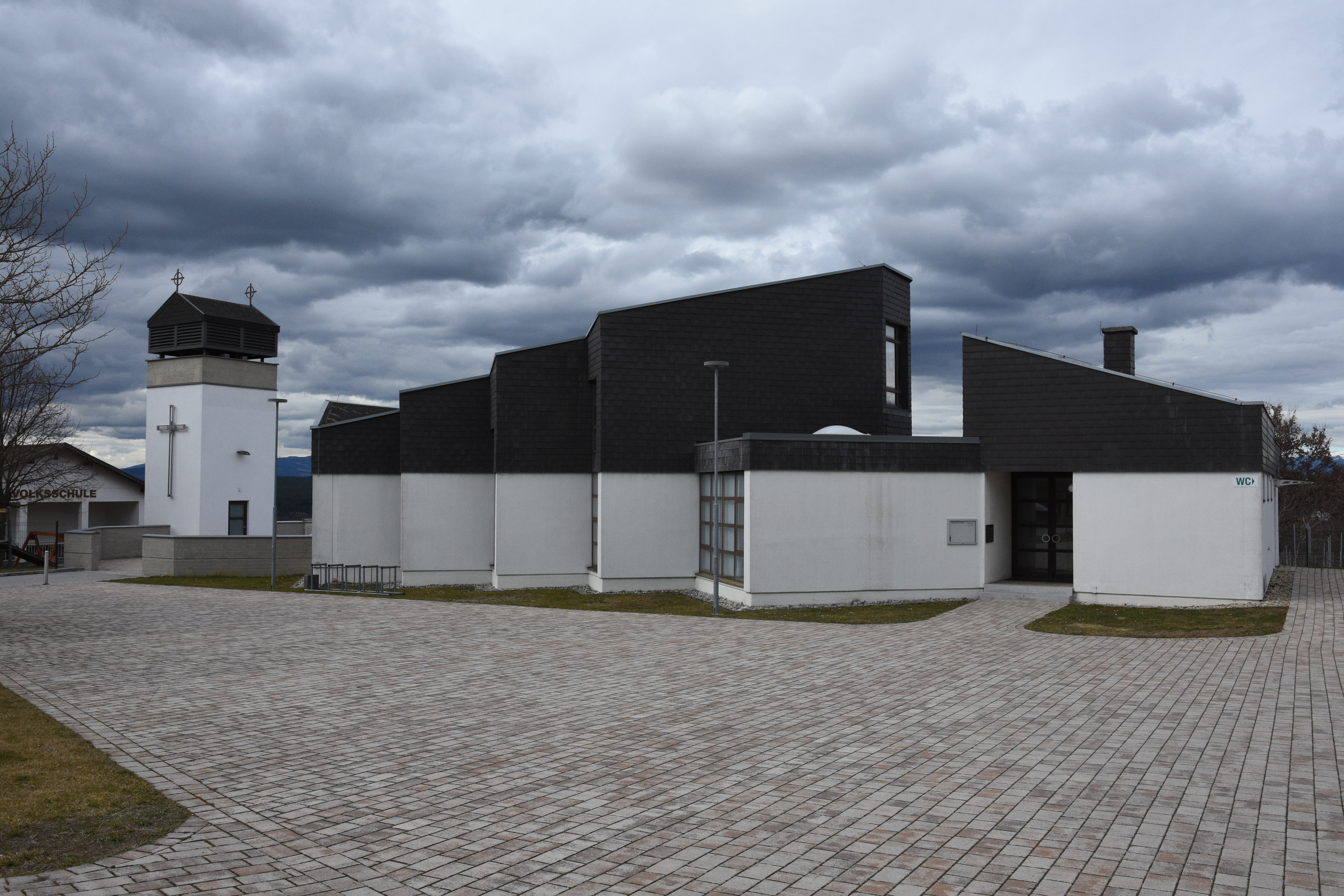
- Wörterberg parish church

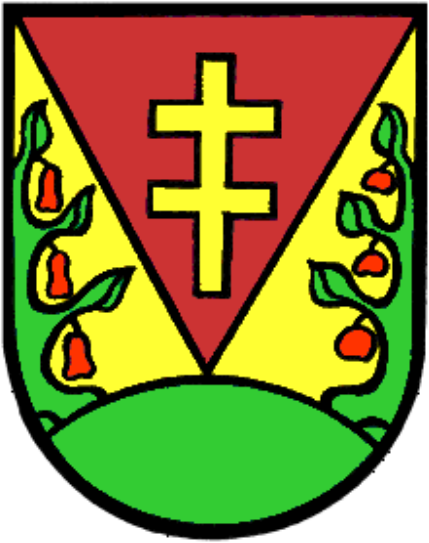
- Coat of arms

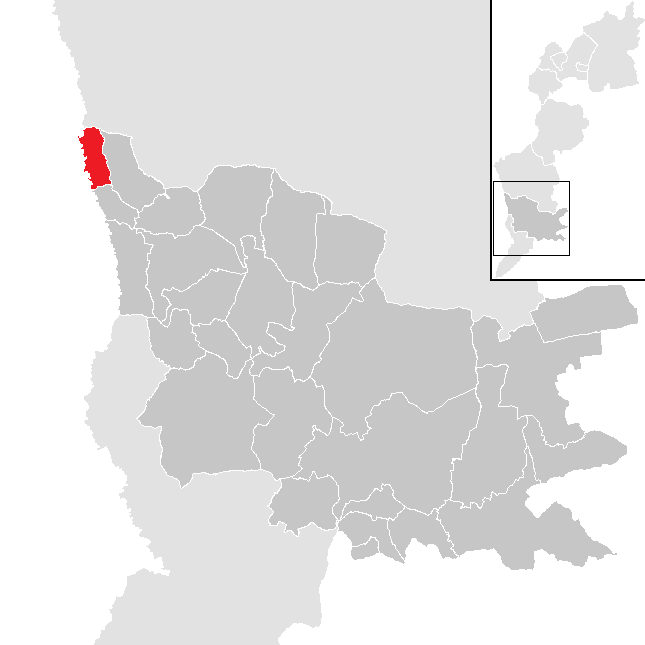
- Location within Güssing district

- Location within Austria
- Coordinates: 47°14′N 16°6′E
- Country: Austria
- State: Burgenland
- District: Güssing

Government
  - Mayor: Kurt Wagner (SPÖ)

Area
  - Total: 4.76 km^{2} (1.84 sq mi)

Population (2018-01-01)
  - Total: 488
  - Density: 103/km^{2} (266/sq mi)
- Time zone: UTC+1 (CET)
  - Summer (DST): UTC+2 (CEST)
- Postal code: 8293
- Website: www.woerterberg.at

Wörterberg (Hungarian: Vörthegy) is a town in the district of Güssing in the Austrian state of Burgenland.

== Population ==
Historical population
Year	Pop.	±%
1869	606	—
1880	629	+3.8%
1890	664	+5.6%
1900	626	−5.7%
1910	612	−2.2%
1923	555	−9.3%
1934	548	−1.3%
1939	495	−9.7%
1951	486	−1.8%
1961	457	−6.0%
1971	457	+0.0%
1981	465	+1.8%
1991	457	−1.7%
2001	495	+8.3%
2011	496	+0.2%
