= Lukas Resetarits =

Austrian actor

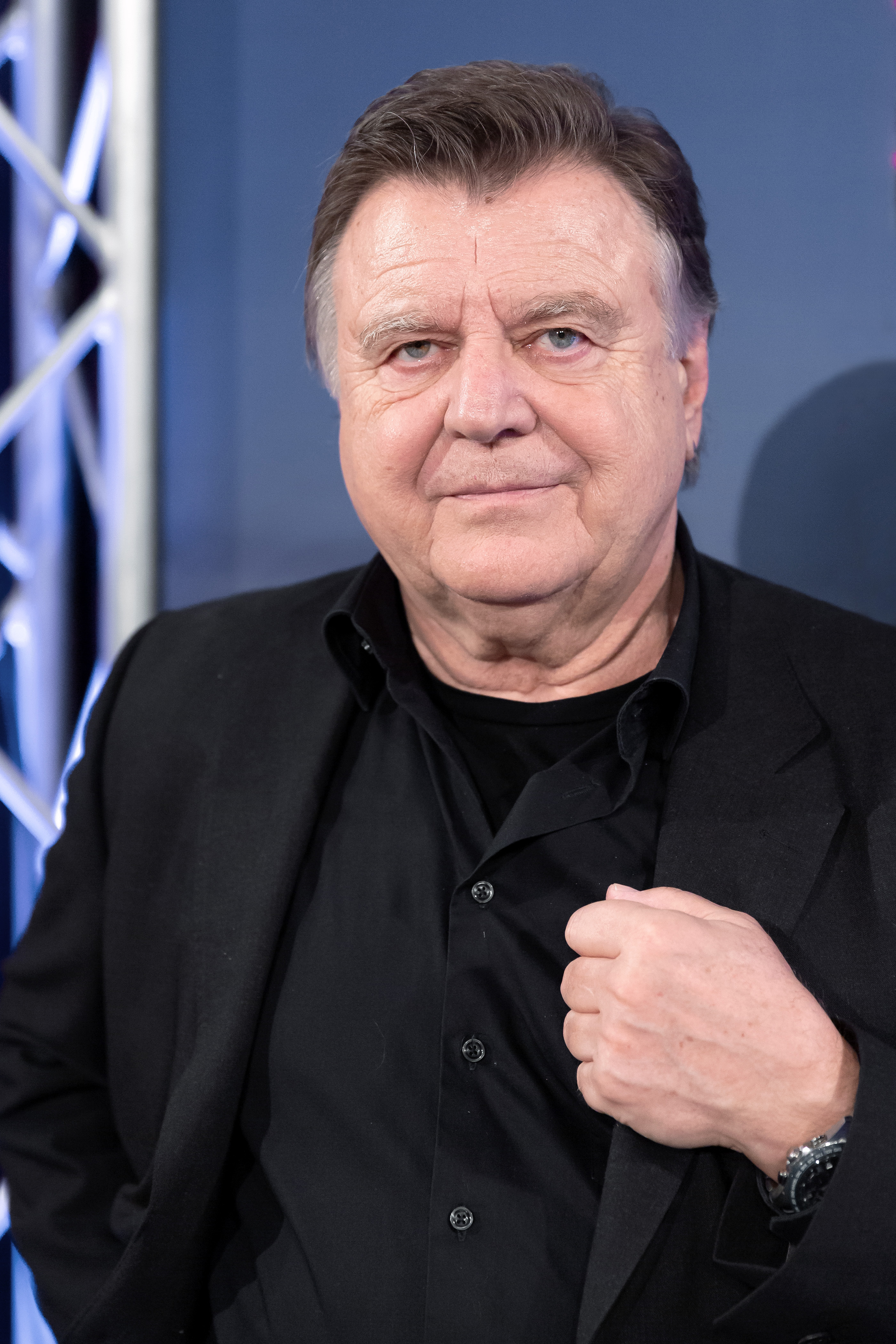
- Lukas Resetarits in 2017
- Born: Erich Lukas Resetarits; 14 October 1947 (age 78); Stinatz, Austria
- Occupations: Austrian cabaret artist and actor

Erich Lukas Resetarits (born 14 October 1947, in Stinatz) is an Austrian comedic artist ("Kabarett", which is an Austrian type of comedian in a tradition heavily influenced by Karl Farkas, not to be confused with cabaret) and actor, best known for playing police inspector Kottan in the Austrian TV series Kottan ermittelt.

Resetarits was born in the Austrian state Burgenland, but his family moved to Vienna when he was at the age of four. Resetarits attended Austrian gymnasium which he finished in 1965. He studied psychology and philosophy at the University of Vienna, at the same time jobbing as rock singer, construction worker and traffic officer at the Vienna International Airport.

In 1975 he joined the cabaret group KEIF, which consisted of Wolfgang Teuschl, Erwin Steinhauer, Alfred Rubatschek and Erich Demmer. The group decided to call him by his second given name Lukas, to avoid confusion with the other Erich. In 1977 together with Teuschl and Steinhauer he performed the TV cabaret Tu felix Austria.

On 26 October 1977 he premiered his first solo program Rechts Mitte Links in the Konzerthauskeller. In May 1978 he presented his second solo program "A Krise muaß her", and performed a second TV cabaret with Teuschl and Steinhauer, Man wird ja noch fragen dürfen. He released his first LP vinyl record "Ein Abend mit Lukas Resetarits" ("An Evening with Lukas Resetarits") in 1979.

From 1980 to 1983 he was main actor in the Austrian TV series Kottan ermittelt, written by Helmut Zenker and directed by Peter Patzak.

Resetarits has been married since 1968 and has two daughters. Willi Resetarits (musician known as Dr. Kurt Ostbahn) and Peter Resetarits (TV host at ORF) are brothers. Karin Resetarits, a present member of the European Parliament, is his former sister-in-law.

== Cabaret programs ==
- 1977: Rechts Mitte Links
- 1978: A Krise muaß her
- 1979: Haben schon gewählt
- 1979: Alles leiwaund
- 1981: Nur kane Wellen
- 1982: Ka Zukunft
- 1983: Vorläufig ohne Titel
- 1984: Was nun
- 1985: I oder I
- 1986: Das 10. Programm
- 1987: Rekapituliere
- 1988: Nichts geht mehr
- 1989: Zu blöd
- 1990: Ich bin so frei
- 1991: Heimspiel – live
- 1992: Zu bunt
- 1995: Alles zurück
- 1997: Kein Grund zum Feiern
- 1999: Ich tanze nicht
- 2001: Niemandsland
- 2002: Zeit
- 2003: Nachspielzeit
- 2006: XXII
- 2009: Osterreich – ein Warietee
- 2012: UN RUHE STAND
- 2015: Schmäh
- 2017: 70er – leben lassen
- 2019: Wurscht
- 2022: Das Letzte
- 2022: Über Leben

== Awards ==
- Nestroy-Ring 1981
- Österreichischer Kleinkunstpreis 1981, 1983, 1984
- Deutscher Kleinkunstpreis 1985
- "Ybbser Spaßvogel"
- Romy 1997, best actor
- German Cabaret Prize 1998
- Karl 2004
- Goldenes Ehrenzeichen für Verdienste um die Republik Österreich 2012
