= Idols 4 =

- Season 4
- Hosted by: Wendy van Dijk; Martijn Krabbé
- Judges: Eric van Tijn; John Ewbank; Jerney Kaagman; Gordon
- Winner: Nikki Kerkhof
- Runner-up: Nathalie Makoma

Release
- Original network: RTL 4
- Original release: October 20, 2007 – March 1, 2008

Season chronology
- ← Previous; Idols 3 Next → Idols 5

Idols 4 was the fourth season of the Dutch version of Idols hosted by Martijn Krabbé & Wendy van Dijk and held in 2007-2008.

The winner was Nikki Kerkhof, with Nathalie Makoma as runner up.

== Summaries ==
=== Contestants ===
(ages stated are at time of contest) (in order of elimination)

- Sandy Goeree, 28, from Groningen, Groningen
- Ollie Du Croix, 22, from Venlo, Limburg
- Asnat Ferdinandus, 26, from Appingedam, Groningen
- Mirjam de Jager, 17, from Veldhoven, North Brabant
- Bas van Rijckevorsel, 19, from Breda, North Brabant
- Tiffany Maes, 20, from Westervoort, Gelderland
- Pauline Zurlohe, 35, from Arnhem, Gelderland
- Neil Hendriks, 17, from Groningen, Groningen
- Nigel Brown, 23, from Amersfoort, Utrecht
- Charlene Meulenberg, 19, from Utrecht, Utrecht
- Nathalie Makoma, 26, from Rotterdam, South Holland Runner-up
- Nikki Kerkhof, 24, from Sint-Oedenrode, North Brabant Winner

=== Liveshow Themes ===
- Liveshow 1 (December 22, 2007): Las Vegas
- Liveshow 2 (December 29, 2007): 80s
- Liveshow 3 (January 5, 2008): Dutch Artists
- Liveshow 4 (January 12, 2008): Disco
- Liveshow 5 (January 19, 2008): Musical
- Liveshow 6 (January 26, 2008): Brit Pop
- Liveshow 7 (February 2, 2008): Dutch Language
- Liveshow 8 (February 9, 2008): Love
- Liveshow 9 (February 16, 2008): Big Band
- Liveshow 10 (February 23, 2008): Semi Final
- Liveshow 11 (March 1, 2008): Final

=== Judges ===
- Eric van Tijn
- John Ewbank
- Jerney Kaagman
- Gordon

== Finals ==
=== Live show details ===
==== Pre Live Show (15 December 2007) ====
Artist	Song (original artists)	Result
Aisha Echteld	"Won't Cry" (Krezip)	Eliminated
Asnat Ferdinandus	"Emotion" (Samantha Sang)	Advanced
Bas van Rijckevorsel	"It's a Beautiful Day" (Queen)	Advanced
Charlene Meulenberg	"Just Fine" (Mary J. Blige)	Advanced
Davy Oonincx	"Gallery" (Mario Vazquez)	Eliminated
Ferry Doedens	"I Want You Back" (The Jackson 5)	Eliminated
Mirjam de Jager	"Window of Hope" (Oleta Adams)	Advanced
Naomi Reingoud	"Crazy in Love" (Beyoncé)	Eliminated
Nathalie Makoma	"And I Am Telling You I'm Not Going" (Jennifer Holliday)	Advanced
Neil Hendriks	"Stuck on You" (Lionel Richie)	Advanced
Nigel Brown	"Because of You" (Ne-Yo)	Advanced
Nikki Kerkhof	"Super Duper Love" (Joss Stone)	Advanced
Ollie Du Croix	"Hard to Say I'm Sorry" (Chicago)	Advanced
Pauline Zurlohe	"Iris" (Goo Goo Dolls)	Advanced
Rick van den Helder	"Alles is liefde" (BLØF)	Eliminated
Sandy Goeree	"Good God" (Anouk)	Advanced
Syarda Steers	"Numb" (Linkin Park)	Eliminated
Tiffany Maes	"This Ain't Gonna Work" (Alain Clark)	Advanced

Notes

- The judges selected Asnat Ferdinandus and Mirjam de Jager to move on into the top 12 of the competition.

==== Live Show 1 (22 December 2007) ====
Theme: Las Vegas

Artist	Song (original artists)	Result
Asnat Ferdinandus	"You've Lost That Lovin' Feelin'" (The Righteous Brothers)	Safe
Bas van Rijckevorsel	"Reet Petite" (Jackie Wilson)	Bottom two
Charlene Meulenberg	"In the Ghetto" (Elvis Presley)	Safe
Mirjam de Jager	"I Got Trouble" (Christina Aguilera)	Safe
Nathalie Makoma	"Hot Shot" (Karen Young)	Safe
Neil Hendriks	"Mandy" (Barry Manilow)	Safe
Nigel Brown	"Ballerina" (Nat King Cole)	Safe
Nikki Kerkhof	"Pretty Vegas" (INXS)	Safe
Ollie Du Croix	"I've Got You Under My Skin" (Frank Sinatra)	Safe
Pauline Zurlohe	"This is My Life" (Shirley Bassey)	Bottom three
Sandy Goeree	"My Baby Just Cares for Me" (Nina Simone)	Eliminated
Tiffany Maes	"Hot Legs" (Rod Stewart)	Safe

==== Live Show 2 (29 December 2007) ====
Theme: 80s

Artist	Song (original artists)	Result
Asnat Ferdinandus	"Let's Hear It for the Boy" (Deniece Williams)	Safe
Bas van Rijckevorsel	"I Still Haven't Found What I'm Looking For" (U2)	Safe
Charlene Meulenberg	"Stop Loving You" (Toto)	Safe
Mirjam de Jager	"Total Eclipse of the Heart" (Bonnie Tyler)	Bottom two
Nathalie Makoma	"Eternal Flame" (The Bangles)	Safe
Neil Hendriks	"Never Gonna Give You Up" (Rick Astley)	Safe
Nigel Brown	"Club Tropicana" (Wham!)	Bottom three
Nikki Kerkhof	"Tell It to My Heart" (Taylor Dayne)	Safe
Ollie Du Croix	"Gold" (Spandau Ballet)	Eliminated
Pauline Zurlohe	"Footloose" (Kenny Loggins)	Safe
Tiffany Maes	"Dance Little Sister" (Terence Trent D'Arby)	Safe

==== Live Show 3 (5 January 2008) ====
Theme: Dutch Artists

Artist	Song (original artists)	Result
Asnat Ferdinandus	"Standing Strong Together" (Total Touch)	Eliminated
Bas van Rijckevorsel	"Radar Love" (Golden Earring)	Bottom two/Winner of the Week
Charlene Meulenberg	"Breezy" (Wouter Hamel)	Safe
Mirjam de Jager	"Follow Me" (Do)	Safe
Nathalie Makoma	"Send Me an Angel" (CB Milton)	Safe
Neil Hendriks	"Are You Ready for Loving Me" (René Froger)	Safe
Nigel Brown	"You" (Ten Sharp)	Bottom three
Nikki Kerkhof	"Rain Down on Me" (Kane)	Safe
Pauline Zurlohe	"Nobody's Wife" (Anouk)	Safe
Tiffany Maes	"Live It Up" (Time Bandits)	Safe

==== Live Show 4 (12 January 2008) ====
Theme: Disco

Artist	Song (original artists)	Result
Bas van Rijckevorsel	"Maniac" (Michael Sembello)	Bottom three
Charlene Meulenberg	"Best of My Love" (The Emotions)	Safe
Mirjam de Jager	"Working My Way Back to You" (The Spinners)	Eliminated
Nathalie Makoma	"Stayin' Alive" (Bee Gees)	Safe
Neil Hendriks	"I'll Be There" (The Jackson 5)	Safe
Nigel Brown	"Heaven Must Be Missing an Angel" (Tavares)	Safe
Nikki Kerkhof	"If I Can't Have You" (Yvonne Elliman)	Bottom four
Pauline Zurlohe	"One Night Only" (Jennifer Hudson, Beyoncé, Anika Noni Rose & Sharon Leal)	Safe
Tiffany Maes	"The Boss" (Diana Ross)	Bottom two

==== Live Show 5 (19 January 2008) ====
Theme: Musicals

Artist	Song (original artists)	Result
Bas van Rijckevorsel	"Bij mij moet je zijn" (Tarzan)	Eliminated
Charlene Meulenberg	"Alles ademt en leeft" (The Lion King)	Safe
Nathalie Makoma	"Dans van de mantel" (Aida)	Safe
Neil Hendriks	"Jij woont in mijn hart" (Tarzan)	Bottom three
Nigel Brown	"Gethsemane" (Jesus Christ Superstar)	Safe
Nikki Kerkhof	"Climb Ev'ry Mountain" (The Sound of Music)	Safe
Pauline Zurlohe	"Don't Cry for Me Argentina" (Evita)	Safe
Tiffany Maes	"When You Believe" (The Prince of Egypt)	Bottom two

==== Live Show 6 (26 January 2008) ====
Theme: Brit Pop

Artist	Song (original artists)	Result
Charlene Meulenberg	"Runaway" (Jamiroquai)	Safe
Nathalie Makoma	"I'm Still Standing" (Elton John)	Safe
Neil Hendriks	"One Love" (Blue)	Bottom three
Nigel Brown	"Somewhere Only We Know" (Keane)	Bottom two
Nikki Kerkhof	"Bleeding Love" (Leona Lewis)	Safe
Pauline Zurlohe	"Weak" (Skunk Anansie)	Safe
Tiffany Maes	"Stronger" (Sugababes)	Eliminated

==== Live Show 7 (2 February 2008) ====
Theme: Dutch Hits

Artist	Song (original artists)	Result
Charlene Meulenberg	"De bestemming" (Marco Borsato)	Bottom two
Nathalie Makoma	"Vrede" (Ruth Jacott)	Safe
Neil Hendriks	"Doe dit, doe dat" (Jim Bakkum)	Bottom three
Nigel Brown	"Heerlijk" (Alain Clark)	Safe
Nikki Kerkhof	"Afscheid" (Volumia!)	Safe
Pauline Zurlohe	"Zij gelooft in mij" (André Hazes)	Eliminated

==== Live Show 8 (9 February 2008) ====
Theme: Love Songs

Artist	First song (original artists)	Second song	Result
Charlene Meulenberg	"Run to You" (Whitney Houston)	"True to Your Heart" (98 Degrees & Stevie Wonder)	Safe
Nathalie Makoma	"I'm Outta Love" (Anastacia)	"Un-Break My Heart" (Toni Braxton)	Bottom two
Neil Hendriks	"I Want It That Way" (Backstreet Boys)	"You Can't Hurry Love" (Phil Collins)	Eliminated
Nigel Brown	"Unchained Melody" (The Righteous Brothers)	"My Love" (Justin Timberlake)	Bottom three
Nikki Kerkhof	"River Deep – Mountain High" (Ike & Tina Turner)	"From This Moment On" (Shania Twain)	Safe

==== Live Show 9 (16 February 2008) ====
Theme: Big Band

Artist	First song (original artists)	Second song	Result
Charlene Meulenberg	"Respect" (Aretha Franklin)	"Car Wash" (Rose Royce)	Bottom two
Nathalie Makoma	"Big Spender" (Shirley Bassey)	"Proud Mary" (Tina Turner)	Safe
Nigel Brown	"Sway" (Dean Martin)	"If I Ain't Got You" (Alicia Keys)	Eliminated
Nikki Kerkhof	"Valerie" (Mark Ronson & Amy Winehouse)	"I (Who Have Nothing)" (Shirley Bassey)	Winner of the week

==== Live Show 10: Semi-final (23 February 2008) ====
Artist	First song (original artists)	Second song	Result
Charlene Meulenberg	"Bubbly" (Colbie Caillat)	"Shut Up and Drive" (Rihanna)	Eliminated
Nathalie Makoma	"Some Kinda Rush" (Booty Luv)	"No One" (Alicia Keys)	Safe
Nikki Kerkhof	"All My Life" (Krezip)	"Mesmerized" (Faith Evans)	Safe

==== Live final (1 March 2008) ====
Artist	First song	Second song	Third song	Result
Nathalie Makoma	"Stayin' Alive"	"Ola ole"	"Hello World"	Runner-up
Nikki Kerkhof	"River Deep – Mountain High"	"When the Spirit of the Lord"	"Hello World"	Winner

Preceded by Season 3 (2005)	Idols; Season 4 (2007)	Succeeded by Season 5 (2016)
