= Idols 2 =

- Season 2
- Hosted by: Tooske Ragas; Reinout Oerlemans
- Judges: Henkjan Smits; Eric van Tijn; Jerney Kaagman; Edwin Jansen
- Winner: Boris Titulaer
- Runner-up: Maud Mulder

Release
- Original network: RTL 4
- Original release: December 6, 2003 – May 1, 2004

Season chronology
- ← Previous; Idols 1 Next → Idols 3

Idols 2 was the second season of the Dutch version of Idols hosted by Reinout Oerlemans & Tooske Ragas.

The winner was Boris Titulaer with Maud Mulder as runner-up.

== Summaries ==
=== Contestants ===
(ages stated are at time of contest)
(in order of elimination)

- Meike Hurts, 22
- Robin Zijlstra, 24
- Ron Link, 24
- Alice Hoes, 18
- Eric Bouwman, 21
- Irma van Pamelen, 19
- Marlies Schuitemaker, 23
- JK, 23
- Maud Mulder, 22 (runner-up)
- Boris Titulaer, 23 (winner)

=== Liveshow Themes ===
- Liveshow 1 (March 6, 2004): My Idol
- Liveshow 2 (March 13, 2004): Motown
- Liveshow 3 (March 20, 2004): Top 40 Hits
- Liveshow 4 (March 27, 2004): Disco
- Liveshow 5 (April 3, 2004): Dutch Hits
- Liveshow 6 (April 10, 2004): Party
- Liveshow 7 (April 17, 2004): Big Band
- Liveshow 8 (April 24, 2004): People's Choice
- Final Liveshow (May 1, 2004)

=== Judges ===
- Henkjan Smits
- Eric van Tijn
- Jerney Kaagman
- Edwin Jansen

== Finals ==
=== Live show details ===
==== Heat 1 (31 January 2004) ====
Artist	Song (original artists)	Result
Anne Van Der Heijden	"Like the Way I Do" (Melissa Etheridge)	Eliminated
Maickel Leijenhorst	"I Believe I Can Fly" (R. Kelly)	Eliminated
Sharon Doorson	"Vision of Love" (Mariah Carey)	Eliminated
Gerbrich	"Piece of My Heart" (Janis Joplin)	Eliminated
Ron Link	"The Greatest Love We'll Never Know" (René Froger)	Advanced
Marlies Schuitemaker	"Ironic" (Alanis Morissette)	Advanced
Krystle Koers	"How Do I Live" (LeAnn Rimes)	Eliminated
Frank de Graaf	"Layla" (Derek and the Dominos)	Eliminated
Maud Mulder	"White Flag" (Dido)	Advanced

Notes

- The judges selected Ron Link to move on into the Top 10 of the competition, before the hosts revealed the Top 4 vote getters. Marlies Schuitemaker and Maud Mulder advanced to the top 10 of the competition. The other 6 contestants were eliminated.
- Sharon Doorson and Frank de Graaf returned for a second chance at the top 10 in the Wildcard Round.

==== Heat 2 (7 February 2004) ====
Artist	Song (original artists)	Result
Kostian Kloeze	"She Goes Nana" (The Radios)	Eliminated
Megan Brands	"Don't Play That Song (You Lied)" (Aretha Franklin)	Eliminated
Nick Schilder	"Unchained Melody" (The Righteous Brothers)	Eliminated
Lianne van Groen	"Think Twice" (Celine Dion)	Eliminated
Hedwig Platzer	"Foolish Games" (Jewel)	Eliminated
JK	"All My Life" (K-Ci & JoJo)	Advanced
Merel Koman	"Beyond Gravity" (Ilse DeLange)	Eliminated
Robin Zijlstra	"A Different Corner" (George Michael)	Advanced
Meike Hurts	"Last Dance" (Donna Summer)	Advanced

Notes

- The judges selected Meike Hurts to move on into the Top 10 of the competition, before the hosts revealed the Top 4 vote getters. Robin Zijlstra and JK advanced to the top 10 of the competition. The other 6 contestants were eliminated.
- Nick Schilder and Merel Koman returned for a second chance at the top 10 in the Wildcard Round.

==== Heat 3 (14 February 2004) ====
Artist	Song (original artists)	Result
Fardoe Swaanswijk	"Not That Kind" (Anastacia)	Eliminated
Boris Titulaer	"What's Going On" (Marvin Gaye)	Advanced
Irma van Pamelen	"Takes My Breath Away" (Tuck & Patti)	Advanced
Martijn Dijkstra	"Hello" (Lionel Richie)	Eliminated
Alice Hoes	"Fire" (The Pointer Sisters)	Eliminated
Daniel Irawan	"Walking Away" (Craig David)	Eliminated
Elisaar Andringa	"(There's Gotta Be) More to Life" (Stacie Orrico)	Eliminated
Eric Bouwman	"Mandy" (Westlife)	Advanced
Tialda van Slogteren	"A Moment Like This" (Kelly Clarkson)	Eliminated

Notes

- The judges selected Eric Bouwman to move on into the Top 10 of the competition, before the hosts revealed the Top 4 vote getters. Boris Titulaer and Irma van Pamelen advanced to the top 10 of the competition. The other 6 contestants were eliminated.
- Alice Hoes and Tialda van Slogteren returned for a second chance at the top 10 in the Wildcard Round.

==== Wildcard round (21 February 2004) ====
Artist	Song (original artists)	Result
Tialda van Slogteren	"Slow Down" (India Arie)	Eliminated
Sharon Doorson	"Breathe" (Blu Cantrell)	Eliminated
Frank de Graaf	"This Is the Moment" (René Froger)	Eliminated
Merel Koman	"Kiss from a Rose" (Seal)	Eliminated
Nick Schilder	"To Be with You" (Mr. Big)	Eliminated
Alice Hoes	"Powerless (Say What You Want)" (Nelly Furtado)	Advanced

Notes

- Alice Hoes received the most votes, and completed the top 10.

==== Live Show 1 (6 March 2004) ====
Theme: My Idol

Artist	Song (original artists)	Result
Ron Link	"If Tomorrow Never Comes" (Ronan Keating)	Safe
Irma Van Pamelen	"Baby Love" (Mother's Finest)	Bottom three
JK	"End of the Road" (Boyz II Men)	Safe
Meike Hurts	"Don't You Worry 'bout a Thing" (Stevie Wonder)	Eliminated
Robin Zijlstra	"Angel of Harlem" (U2)	Safe
Alice Hoes	"Stop" (Girls Aloud)	Bottom two
Eric Bouwman	"Mr. Bojangles" (Robbie Williams)	Safe
Maud Mulder	"Just Like a Pill" (Pink)	Safe
Marlies Schuitemaker	"Fighter" (Christina Aguilera)	Safe
Boris Titulaer	"When Doves Cry" (Prince)	Safe

==== Live Show 2 (13 March 2004) ====
Theme: Motown

Artist	Song (original artists)	Result
Marlies Schuitemaker	"I Heard It Through the Grapevine" (Marvin Gaye)	Safe
Robin Zijlstra	"Easy" (Commodores)	Eliminated
Alice Hoes	"I Want You Back" (The Jackson 5)	Safe
Boris Titulaer	"Papa Was a Rollin' Stone" (The Temptations)	Safe
JK	"You Are the Sunshine of My Life" (Stevie Wonder)	Safe
Maud Mulder	"Signed, Sealed, Delivered I'm Yours" (Stevie Wonder)	Bottom three
Eric Bouwman	"Dancing on the Ceiling" (Lionel Richie)	Safe
Irma van Pamelen	"I Wish" (Stevie Wonder)	Bottom two
Ron Link	"For Once in My Life" (Stevie Wonder)	Safe

==== Live Show 3 (20 March 2004) ====
Theme: Top 40 Hits

Artist	Song (original artists)	Result
JK	"Walou" (Outlandish)	Safe
Maud Mulder	"Don't Say That You Love Me" (Trijntje Oosterhuis)	Safe
Eric Bouwman	"She Believes in Me" (Ronan Keating)	Bottom three
Irma van Pamelen	"God Is a DJ" (Pink)	Safe
Ron Link	"My Friend" (Julian Thomas)	Eliminated
Alice Hoes	"Superstar" (Jamelia)	Bottom two
Boris Titulaer	"First Day of My Life" (The Rasmus)	Safe
Marlies Schuitemaker	"It's My Life" (No Doubt)	Safe

==== Live Show 4 (27 March 2004) ====
Theme: Disco

Artist	Song (original artists)	Result
Maud Mulder	"Blame It on the Boogie" (The Jacksons)	Bottom three
Alice Hoes	"Heaven Must Be Missing an Angel" (Tavares)	Eliminated
Boris Titulaer	"Play That Funky Music" (Wild Cherry)	Safe
Marlies Schuitemaker	"If I Can't Have You" (Yvonne Elliman)	Safe
JK	"Can't Take My Eyes Off You" (Frankie Valli)	Bottom two
Eric Bouwman	"Fresh" (Kool & the Gang)	Safe
Irma van Pamelen	"Hot Stuff" (Donna Summer)	Safe

==== Live Show 5 (3 April 2004) ====
Theme: Dutch Hits

Artist	Song (original artists)	Result
Eric Bouwman	"Ik bel je zomaar even op" (Gordon Heuckeroth)	Eliminated
Marlies Schuitemaker	"Onderweg" (Abel)	Safe
Boris Titulaer	"Harder dan ik hebben kan" (BLØF)	Safe
Irma van Pamelen	"Vlieg met me mee" (Trijntje Oosterhuis)	Bottom two
JK	"Is dit alles" (Doe Maar)	Safe
Maud Mulder	"Afscheid" (Volumia!)	Bottom three

==== Live Show 6 (10 April 2004) ====
Theme: Party

Artist	First song (original artists)	Second song	Result
Irma van Pamelen	"When I Get You Alone" (Robin Thicke)	"Girls Just Want to Have Fun" (Cyndi Lauper)	Eliminated
Boris Titulaer	"1999" (Prince)	"Rock Your Body" (Justin Timberlake)	Safe
Maud Mulder	"This Is How We Do It" (Montell Jordan)	"Dancing in the Street" (Martha and the Vandellas)	Bottom two
JK	"Mambo No. 5" (Lou Bega)	"Saturday Night" (The Underdog Project)	Safe
Marlies Schuitemaker	"Listen to the Music" (The Doobie Brothers)	"The Loco-Motion" (Kylie Minogue)	Safe

==== Live Show 7 (17 April 2004) ====
Theme: Big Band

Artist	First song (original artists)	Second song	Result
Boris Titulaer	"I've Got You Under My Skin" (Frank Sinatra)	"Kiss" (Prince)	Safe
Maud Mulder	"Makin' Whoopee" (Ella Fitzgerald)	"Are You Gonna Go My Way" (Lenny Kravitz)	Bottom two
Marlies Schuitemaker	"Big Spender" (Peggy Lee)	"I'm Outta Love" (Anastacia)	Eliminated
JK	"Fly Me to the Moon" (Frank Sinatra)	"Conga" (Miami Sound Machine)	Safe

==== Live Show 8: Semi-final (24 April 2004) ====
Theme: People's Choice

Artist	First song (original artists)	Second song	Third song	Result
JK	"Yeah!" (Usher)	"Hey Joe" (Willy DeVille)	"Get Up, Stand Up" (Bob Marley)	Eliminated
Maud Mulder	"Thank You" (Dido)	"Hole in the Head" (Sugababes)	"Ain't No Sunshine" (Bill Withers)	Safe
Boris Titulaer	"Respect" (Aretha Franklin)	"Angie" (The Rolling Stones)	"Billie Jean" (Michael Jackson)	Safe

==== Live final (1 May 2004) ====
Artist	First song	Second song	Result
Boris Titulaer	"When You Think of Me"	"Papa Was a Rollin' Stone"	Winner
Maud Mulder	"When You Think of Me"	"Dancing in the Street"	Runner-up

Preceded by Season 1 (2003)	Idols; Season 2 (2004)	Succeeded by Season 3 (2005)
