= Idols 5 =

- Season 5
- Hosted by: Lieke van Lexmond; Ruben Nicolai
- Judges: Martijn Krabbé; Jamai Loman; Eva Simons; Ronald Molendijk
- Winner: Nina den Hartog
- Runner-up: Kimberly Fransens

Release
- Original network: RTL 4
- Original release: March 23 – June 8, 2016

Season chronology
- ← Previous; Idols 4 Next → Idols 6

Idols 5 is the fifth season of the Dutch version of Idols hosted by Ruben Nicolai and Lieke van Lexmond and held in 2016.

== Summaries ==
=== Contestants ===
(ages stated are at time of contest)

Contestant	Age	From	Outcome
Amber Thijssen	20	Eindhoven, North Brabant	Eliminated in Liveshow 1
Rowen Aida Ben Rabaa	26	Amsterdam, North Holland	Eliminated in Liveshow 1
Jeffrey Saabeel	29	Rotterdam, South Holland	Eliminated in Liveshow 2
Thijs Roseboom	24	Ede, Gelderland	Eliminated in Liveshow 2
Tom de Visser	21	Uden, North Brabant	Eliminated in Liveshow 3
Steve Langreder	17	Benningbroek, North Holland	Eliminated in Liveshow 3
Kimberly Fransens	23	Amsterdam, North Holland	Runner-up
Nina den Hartog	18	Bergambacht, South Holland	Winner

=== Liveshow Themes ===
- Liveshow 1 (May 18, 2016): This is Me
- Liveshow 2 (May 25, 2016): Heroes
- Liveshow 3 (June 1, 2016): Semi Final
- Liveshow 4 (June 8, 2016): Final

=== Judges ===
- Martijn Krabbé
- Jamai
- Eva Simons
- Ronald Molendijk

== Elimination chart ==
Legend
Males	Females	Top 20	Top 8	Winner

Safe	Bottom Three	Bottom Two	Eliminated

Stage:		Semifinals		Liveshows			
Week:		04/5	11/5	18/5	25/5	1/6	8/6
Place	Contestant	Result					
1	Nina den Hartog	Safe	Safe	Safe	Safe	Safe	Winner
2	Kimberly Fransens	Safe	Safe	Safe	Safe	Safe	Runner-Up
3	Steve Langreder	Safe	Safe	Safe	Safe	Elim	
4	Tom De Visser	Safe	Safe	Safe	Bottom 3	Elim	
5	Thijs Roseboom	Safe	Safe	Safe	Elim		
6	Jeffrey Saabeel	Safe	Safe	Bottom 3	Elim		
7	Rowen Aida Ben Rabaa	Safe	Safe	Elim			
8	Amber Thijssen	Safe	Safe	Elim			
9–10	Yoran de Bont	Safe	Elim				
9–10	Jeroen van Waarden	Safe	Elim				
11–20	Bob Coenen	Elim					
11–20	Thysa de Bruijn	Elim					
11–20	Johnny Dauphin	Elim					
11–20	Aisha Echteld	Elim					
11–20	Laura Guldemond	Elim					
11–20	Michelle Hoogendoorn	Elim					
11–20	Guillaume Van de Leuv	Elim					
11–20	Dennis Den Otter	Elim					
11–20	Jessica Paczkowska	Elim					
11–20	Zoë Love Smith	Elim					

== Finals ==
=== Live show details ===
==== Live Show 1 (18 May 2016) ====
Theme: This is me

Artist	Song (original artist)	Result
Thijs Roseboom	"Cake by the Ocean" (DNCE)	Safe
Amber Thijssen	"Pillowtalk" (Zayn)	Eliminated
Jeffrey Saabeel	"Wil Je Bij Me Zijn (El Perdón)" (Nicky Jam & Enrique Iglesias)	Bottom three
Kimberly Fransens	"Stone Cold" (Demi Lovato)	Safe
Tom de Visser	"Don't Look Down" (Martin Garrix feat. Usher)	Safe
Rowen Aida Ben Rabaa	"Can't Rely on You" (Paloma Faith)	Eliminated
Nina den Hartog	"It Will Rain" (Bruno Mars)	Safe
Steve Langreder	"Best I Ever Had" (Gavin DeGraw)	Safe

==== Live Show 2 (25 May 2016) ====
Theme: Heroes

Artist	First song (original artist)	Second song (original artist)	Result
Steve Langreder	"Bang Bang" (Jessie J feat. Nicki Minaj and Ariana Grande)	"Strong" (London Grammar)	Safe
Tom de Visser	"Broken Strings" (James Morrison and Nelly Furtado)	"I Won't Give Up" (Jason Mraz)	Bottom three
Nina den Hartog	"Someone like You" (Adele)	"Faded" (Alan Walker)	Safe
Thijs Roseboom	"Daughters" (John Mayer)	"A Sky Full of Stars" (Coldplay)	Eliminated
Kimberly Fransens	"Billie Jean" (Michael Jackson)	"Elastic Heart" (Sia)	Safe
Jeffrey Saabeel	"Ik leef niet meer voor jou" (Marco Borsato)		Eliminated

Note that Jeffrey was eliminated after the first round of performances and thus only performed one song.

==== Live Show 3: Semi-final (1 June 2016) ====
Artist	First song (original artist)	Second song (original artist)	Result
Kimberly Fransens	"Shotgun" (Yellow Claw feat. Rochelle Perts)	"Dangerous Woman" (Ariana Grande)	Safe
Steve Langreder	"King" (Years & Years)	"Titanium" (David Guetta feat. Sia)	Eliminated
Nina den Hartog	"Somewhere Only We Know" (Lily Allen; original by Keane)	"Rocketeer" (Far East Movement feat. Ryan Tedder)	Safe
Tom de Visser	"Lean On" (Major Lazer and DJ Snake)	"Fast Car" (Jonas Blue feat. Dakota; original by Tracy Chapman)	Eliminated

==== Live final (8 June 2016) ====
Artist	First song (original artist)	Second song (original artist)	Third song (original artist)	Result
Kimberly Fransens	"Love on Top" (Beyoncé)	"When You Believe" (Mariah Carey & Whitney Houston)	"How Bad!" (Kimberley Fransens)	Runner-up
Nina den Hartog	"Addicted to You" (Avicii)	"Lucky" (Jason Mraz & Colbie Caillat)	"Lights Go Out" (Nina den Hartog)	Winner

Preceded by Season 4 (2007)	Idols; Season 5 (2016)	Succeeded by {{{after}}}
