= Idols 6 =

- Season 6
- Hosted by: Lieke van Lexmond; Ruben Nocolai
- Judges: Martijn Krabbé; Jamai Loman; Eva Simons; Ronald Molendijk
- Winner: Julia van Helvoirt
- Runner-up: Bram Boender

Release
- Original network: RTL 4
- Original release: February 1 – April 19, 2017

Season chronology
- ← Previous; Idols 5

Idols 6 is the sixth season of the Dutch version of Idols hosted by Ruben Nicolai & Lieke van Lexmond. The winner was Julia van Helvoirt with Bram Boender as runner-up.

== Summaries ==
=== Contestants ===
(ages stated are at time of contest)
(in order of elimination)

- Renee Schnater, 16
- Jahlynn Kalkman, 19
- Mitch Lodewick, 17
- Bram Boender, 20 (runner-up)
- Julia van Helvoirt, 23 (winner)

Preceded by Season 5 (2016)	Idols; Season 6 (2017)	Succeeded by -
