= Nathalie Makoma =

Congolese singer

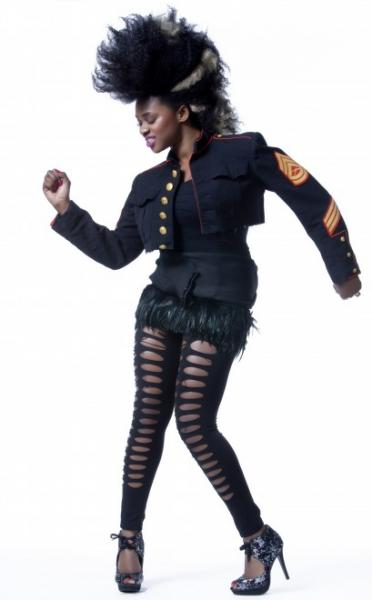

Background information
- Born: Nathalie Makoma; February 24, 1982 (age 44)
- Origin: Kinshasa, Zaire
- Genres: Afropop, R&B, Pop, Rumba Congolaise
- Occupations: Singer, Songwriter
- Instruments: Vocals, Piano, Guitar, Drum
- Years active: 1993–present
- Labels: Sony BMG (2007 - 2011), NM HOUSE MUSIC (2014)
- Website: Official Site

Nathalie Makoma (born 24 February 1982), is a Congolese-Dutch singer-songwriter and best known as the lead vocalist of the group Makoma. Known for blending contemporary gospel, pop, and Congolese musical styles, she gained prominence through her work with the group during the late 1990s and early 2000s. Her solo recordings with Makoma include My Sweet Lord (2000) and N.Y.C. (2001), while her solo album releases include On Faith (2002), On Faith—GoGospel Edition (2003) and I Saw the Light (2005).

In 2007–2008, Makoma participated in the fourth season of the Dutch television talent show Idols, where she finished as the runner-up to Nikki Kerkhof. Following her success on the show, she signed a recording contract with Sony BMG. Makoma continued her involvement in Dutch popular media by competing in Dancing with the Stars (2009), where she secured second place. She also participated in De Mattheus Masterclass in 2010.

One of her songs, I Just Wanna Dance (written and composed by Dsign Music's Anne Judith Wik, Robin Jenssen, Ronny Svendsen, and Nermin Harambašić alongside Fridolin Nordsø), was the demo song that became the basis for South Korean girl group Girls' Generation's hit song Genie (also known by its local title 소원을 말해봐 (Tell Me Your Wish)).

== Career ==
In Nouveau Testament / Makoma
Nathalie Makoma started singing with her family group in 1993 when the band was known as "Nouveau Testament". The group was renamed Makoma and was made up of seven members (three brothers, three sisters and one non-family, whom is also one of her sister's boyfriend). They were very successful singing in Lingala language and in English and French as well.

When Nathalie was fourteen, she moved back to the Netherlands with her family and started studying Onstage Performance at the Rockacademie in Tilburg. At the same time the Makoma band kept on performing becoming more successful and travelling around the whole world. Due to the success of the band, Nathalie had to quit her education.

In 2002, the group won the Best African Music Group at Kora Awards and they had worldwide success in gospel music.

Initial solo career
Being the main vocalist, Nathalie also tried to develop a solo music career starting 2002 with her initial album On Faith (2002). The album was rereleased as GoGospel Edition (2003) with additional tracks. In 2004, she left Makoma to get established in England and later in Ireland. In 2005, she released a second solo album called I Saw the Light.

== Reality television ==
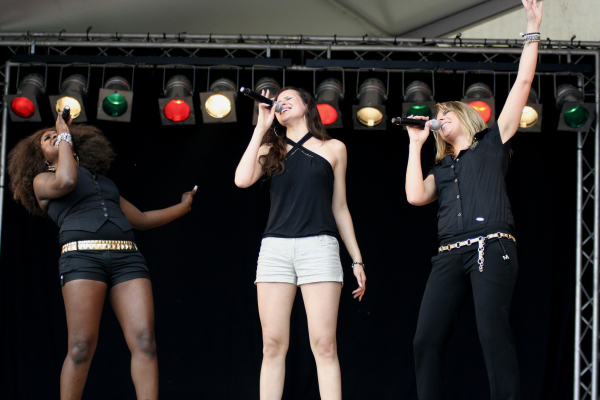
Performance during Idol, from left to right Nathalie Makoma, Charlene Meulenberg and Nikki Kerkhof

Idols
In 2007-2008, she returned to the Netherlands to take part in season 4 of Dutch Idols and finished runner-up to the eventual winner Nikki Kerkhof. The jury called her the "new Tina Turner" and "a real dancing queen". During the competition, her family group Makoma made a guest appearance on the competition final with Nathalie singing "Ola Olé" in English with her. After Idols, Nathalie signed a record deal with Sony BMG and toured the Netherlands, performing in more than 150 shows in one year.

Dancing With the Stars
In 2009, Nathalie took part in the Dutch version of the Dancing With the Stars with her dance partner Peter. She reached the final, and finished second to former Idols-winner Jamai Loman and his partner Gwyneth van Rijn.

De Mattheus Masterclass
In 2010 took part in the second season of the program De Mattheus Masterclass of non-classically trained artists, to perform music by Bach at the church St. Vituskerk in Hilversum.

== Solo career ==
In December 2008, she participated in the RTL 4 program Alles is kerst. In the show she sang with singer Brace the song "All I Want for Christmas Is You" from Mariah Carey.

After her appearance with on Idols, she premiered the single "I Won't Forget", a track that gained further popularity through a remixed by DJ Paul van Dyk and featured in the Dance4Life compilation. In 2010, she dropped her second single, "I Just Wanna Dance", an R&B, pop, and dance-infused track produced by Universal Music and distributed through Sony Music. That year, she left the Sony BMG, and she is currently unsigned singer who is hoping to make Worldwide Music. She signed 2014 to her own record label NM HOUSE MUSIC and released her new single "One More Try" in August 2014.

== Discography ==
=== Albums with Makoma ===
(For details and track lists of albums with Makoma, see Makoma discography)

- 1999: Nzambe na Bomoyi (Jesus For Life)
- 2000: Makoma
- 2000: Baby Come
- 2002: Mokonzi na Bakonzi (King of Kings)
- 2005: Na Nzambe Te, Bomoyi Te (also known as No Jesus, No Life)

=== Nathalie Makoma solo albums ===
- 2002: On Faith
  - Track list:
1. "Time Is a Healer"
2. "Rhythm of Your Love"
3. "On Faith"
4. "Fools Dust"
5. "Talk With God"
6. "Listen to Your Heart"
7. "You"
8. "Rolling to the Top"
9. "Out of the Darkness"
10. "Time Has Come"
11. "My Love Is True"
12. "I Can See the Light"
- 2003: On Faith—GoGospel Edition
  - Same track list plus bonus tracks
1. "Wanna Let You Know"
2. "Tala Ndenge (The Prayer)"
3. "Talk With God" [live] (Gogospel version)
4. "Talk With God" [live] (Gogospel version reprise)
- 2005: I Saw the Light
  - Track list:
1. "I'm Glad I'm Alive"
2. "You've Got a Friend"
3. "Looking at Myself"
4. "My Way"
5. "Lover Be Thy Name"
6. "There Will Be a Light"
7. "I Understand"
8. "Stay"
9. "Love You in My Life"
10. "To Be the One"
11. "I'll Be There"
12. "I Will Bless You"
13. "Amazing Grace"

=== Albums as Makoma featuring Nathalie Makoma ===
- My Sweet Lord (2000)

=== EPs ===
- 2005: I'm Glad I'm Alive (live)
  - Track list
1. I'm Glad I'm Alive"
2. "I'm Glad I'm Alive" (A Version)
3. "To Be the One"

=== Singles ===
Year	Title	Featuring	Peak chart positions		Album
Year	Title	Featuring	NLD Dutch Top 40	NLD Single Top 100	Album
2009	"I Won't Forget"	-	42 ^{1}	12	
2010	"I Just Wanna Dance"	-	57 ^{2}		
2015	"Papa G"	-			
2016	"Omukulu"	-			
2017	"Eyi Mabe"	Awilo Longomba			
2017	"Dis Moi Simplement"	Teko Young City			

- ^{1}: "I Won't Forget" reached number 2 on the Dutch Tipparade, which is equivalent to the position number 42 in the Dutch Top 40.
- ^{2}: "I Just Wanna Dance" reached number 17 on the Dutch Tipparade, which is equivalent to the position number 57 in the Dutch Top 40.

Featured in

Year	Song	Album
2008	"Stayin' Alive" (Gordon featuring Nathalie Makoma)	A Song for You

== See also ==
- Makoma
