= Idols 3 =

- Season 3
- Hosted by: Chantal Janzen; Martijn Krabbé
- Judges: Henkjan Smits; Eric van Tijn; Jerney Kaagman
- Winner: Raffaëla Paton
- Runner-up: Floortje Smit

Release
- Original network: RTL 4
- Original release: October 15, 2005 – March 11, 2006

Season chronology
- ← Previous; Idols 2 Next → Idols 4

Idols 3 was the third season of the Dutch version of Idols hosted by Martijn Krabbé & Chantal Janzen.

The winner was Raffaëla Paton with Floortje Smit as runner-up.

== Summaries ==
=== Contestants ===
(ages stated are at time of contest)
(in order of elimination)

- Renske van der Veer, 25
- Ariel Sietses, 28
- Charissa van Veldt, 26
- I-Jay Cairo, 33
- Christon Kloosterboer, 23
- Marescha van der Stelt, 23
- Aäron Ayal, 17
- Serge Gulikers, 23
- Harm Jacobs, 29
- Angelique Koorndijk, 34
- Ellen Eeftink, 23
- Floortje Smit, 22 (runner-up)
- Raffaëla Paton, 22 (winner)

=== Liveshow Themes ===
- Liveshow 1 (December 31, 2005): Music Out Own Birth Year
- Liveshow 2 (January 7, 2006): Dutch Artists
- Liveshow 3 (January 14, 2006): Jukebox
- Liveshow 4 (January 21, 2006): Rock
- Liveshow 5 (January 28, 2006): 2000s (decade)
- Liveshow 6 (February 4, 2006): Disco
- Liveshow 7 (February 11, 2006): Love Songs
- Liveshow 8 (February 18, 2006): Dutch Songs
- Liveshow 9 (February 25, 2006): Big Band
- Liveshow 10 (March 4, 2006): Choices
- Final Liveshow (March 11, 2006)

=== Judges ===
- Henkjan Smits
- Eric van Tijn
- Jerney Kaagman

== Finals ==
=== Live show details ===
==== Heat 1 (3 December 2005) ====
Artist	Song (original artists)	Result
I-Jay Cairo	"I'll Make Love to You" (Boyz II Men)	Advanced
Karlijn de Vries	"Girl" (Anouk)	Eliminated
Christon Kloosterboer	"All at Sea" (Jamie Cullum)	Advanced
Merle Hendriks	"Bring Me Some Water" (Melissa Etheridge)	Eliminated
Sonny Sinay	"Crazy" (Seal)	Eliminated
Alex	"Let Me Entertain You" (Robbie Williams)	Eliminated
Floortje Smit	"What You're Made of" (Lucie Silvas)	Advanced
Royena Bendt	"I'll Say Goodbye" (Trijntje Oosterhuis)	Eliminated
Charissa van Veldt	"Always There" (Incognito)	Advanced

Notes

- The judges selected Christon Kloosterboer to move on into the Top 13 of the competition, before the hosts revealed the Top 4 vote getters. Floortje Smit, Charissa van Veldt and I-Jay Cairo advanced to the top 13 of the competition. The other 5 contestants were eliminated.
- Merle Hendriks and Sonny Sinay returned for a second chance at the top 13 in the Wildcard Round.

==== Heat 2 (10 December 2005) ====
Artist	Song (original artists)	Result
Clarissa	"I Turn to You" (Christina Aguilera)	Eliminated
Esther	"Time After Time" (Cyndi Lauper)	Eliminated
Gabriel	"Wonderful Tonight" (Eric Clapton)	Eliminated
Angelique Koorndijk	"Spoiled" (Joss Stone)	Advanced
Marscha	"R U Kiddin' Me" (Anouk)	Eliminated
Davide La Cara	"It's My Life" (Bon Jovi)	Eliminated
Renske van der Veer	"Don't Speak" (No Doubt)	Advanced
Aäron Ayal	"Used to Love U" (John Legend)	Advanced
Ariel Sietses	"I'm Like a Bird" (Nelly Furtado)	Advanced

Notes

- The judges selected Renske van der Veer to move on into the Top 13 of the competition, before the hosts revealed the Top 4 vote getters. Aäron Ayal, Angelique Koorndijk and Ariel Sietses advanced to the top 13 of the competition. The other 5 contestants were eliminated.
- Clarissa and Davide La Cara www.davide.nl returned for a second chance at the top 13 in the Wildcard Round.

==== Heat 3 (17 December 2005) ====
Artist	Song (original artists)	Result
William	"Another Day" (Buckshot LeFonque)	Eliminated
Aisata Blackman	"Angel by My Side" (Do)	Eliminated
Harm Jacobs	"Let's Dance" (David Bowie)	Advanced
Marescha van der Stelt	"Lost" (Anouk)	Advanced
Maaike	"Love Me Just a Little Bit More (Totally Hooked on You)" (Dolly Dots)	Eliminated
Sanne	"Karma" (Alicia Keys)	Eliminated
Serge Gulikers	"Have a Little Faith in Me" (John Hiatt)	Eliminated
Ellen Eeftink	"Overjoyed" (Stevie Wonder)	Advanced
Raffaëla Paton	"Disco Inferno" (The Trammps)	Advanced

Notes

- The judges selected Ellen Eeftink to move on into the Top 13 of the competition, before the hosts revealed the Top 4 vote getters. Raffaëla Paton, Harm Jacobs and Marescha van der Stelt advanced to the top 13 of the competition. The other 5 contestants were eliminated.
- Aisata Blackman and Serge Gulikers returned for a second chance at the top 13 in the Wildcard Round.

==== Wildcard round (24 December 2005) ====
Artist	Song (original artists)	Result
Merle Hendriks	"Someday at Christmas" (Stevie Wonder)	Eliminated
Sonny Sinay	"All I Want for Christmas Is You" (Mariah Carey)	Eliminated
Clarissa	"Sleigh Ride" (The Carpenters)	Eliminated
Davide La Cara www.davide.nl	"Feliz Navidad" (Jose Feliciano)	Eliminated
Aisata Blackman	"8 Days of Christmas" (Destiny's Child)	Eliminated
Serge Gulikers	"Driving Home for Christmas" (Chris Rea)	Advanced

Notes

- Serge Gulikers received the most votes, and completed the top 13.

==== Live Show 1 (31 December 2005) ====
Theme: My Birth Year

Artist	Song (original artists)	Result
Angelique Koorndijk	"Spanish Harlem" (Aretha Franklin)	Safe
I-Jay Cairo	"Let's Stay Together" (Al Green)	Safe
Harm Jacobs	"Let's Stick Together" (Bryan Ferry)	Safe
Ariel Sietses	"It's So Easy!" (Linda Ronstadt)	Eliminated
Charissa van Veldt	"This is My Life" (Shirley Bassey)	Bottom three
Renske van der Veer	"Working My Way Back to You" (The Spinners)	Eliminated
Serge Gulikers	"Africa" (Toto)	Safe
Christon Kloosterboer	"Every Little Thing She Does Is Magic" (The Police)	Safe
Ellen Eeftink	"Come On Eileen" (Dexys Midnight Runners)	Safe
Marescha van der Stelt	"Love Is in Control (Finger on the Trigger)" (Donna Summer)	Safe
Raffaëla Paton	"All Night Long (All Night)" (Lionel Richie)	Safe
Floortje Smit	"Fame" (Irene Cara)	Safe
Aäron Ayal	"Get Outta My Dreams, Get into My Car" (Billy Ocean)	Safe

==== Live Show 2 (7 January 2006) ====
Theme: Dutch Artists

Artist	Song (original artists)	Result
Serge Gulikers	"Little Green Bag" (George Baker Selection)	Safe
Charissa van Veldt	"Touch Me There" (Total Touch)	Eliminated
Marescha van der Stelt	"You" (Ten Sharp)	Bottom two
Christon Kloosterboer	"Fearless" (Kane)	Safe
Raffaëla Paton	"I'm Not So Tough" (Ilse DeLange)	Safe
Aäron Ayal	"I'm Specialized in You" (Time Bandits)	Safe
Ellen Eeftink	"Love You More" (Racoon)	Safe
Floortje Smit	"Why Tell Me Why" (Anita Meyer)	Safe
Harm Jacobs	"Saturday Night" (Herman Brood)	Safe
Angelique Koorndijk	"One Word" (Anouk)	Safe
I-Jay Cairo	"When the Lady Smiles" (Golden Earring)	Bottom three

==== Live Show 3 (14 January 2006) ====
Theme: Jukebox

Artist	Song (original artists)	Result
Marescha van der Stelt	"Jailhouse Rock" (Elvis Presley)	Safe
Harm Jacobs	"Wild Thing" (The Troggs)	Safe
Floortje Smit	"It's My Party" (Lesley Gore)	Safe
I-Jay Cairo	"December, 1963 (Oh, What a Night)" (The Four Seasons)	Eliminated
Serge Gulikers	"Blue Suede Shoes" (Elvis Presley)	Safe
Aäron Ayal	"Reach Out I'll Be There" (Four Tops)	Safe
Christon Kloosterboer	"Stand by Me" (Ben E. King)	Bottom three
Angelique Koorndijk	"Twistin' the Night Away" (Sam Cooke)	Safe
Ellen Eeftink	"Spinning Wheel" (Blood, Sweat & Tears)	Bottom two
Raffaëla Paton	"My Guy" (Mary Wells)	Safe

==== Live Show 4 (21 January 2006) ====
Theme: Rock

Artist	Song (original artists)	Result
Raffaëla Paton	"Black Velvet" (Alannah Myles)	Safe
Christon Kloosterboer	"Wonderwall" (Oasis)	Eliminated
Angelique Koorndijk	"Knockin' on Heaven's Door" (Bob Dylan)	Safe
Aäron Ayal	"Hold the Line" (Toto)	Bottom four
Serge Gulikers	"Born to Be Wild" (Steppenwolf)	Safe
Floortje Smit	"Always" (Bon Jovi)	Safe
Marescha van der Stelt	"I Don't Want to Miss a Thing" (Aerosmith)	Bottom two
Ellen Eeftink	"Love Rears Its Ugly Head" (Living Colour)	Bottom three
Harm Jacobs	"Let Love Rule" (Lenny Kravitz)	Safe

==== Live Show 5 (28 January 2006) ====
Theme: Hits 2000

Artist	Song (original artists)	Result
Marescha van der Stelt	"Come On Over Baby (All I Want Is You)" (Christina Aguilera)	Eliminated
Ellen Eeftink	"Super Duper Love" (Joss Stone)	Safe
Aäron Ayal	"Ordinary People" (John Legend)	Bottom two
Raffaëla Paton	"Hit 'Em Up Style (Oops!)" (Blu Cantrell)	Bottom four
Serge Gulikers	"Drops of Jupiter (Tell Me)" (Train)	Safe
Angelique Koorndijk	"Out of Reach" (Gabrielle)	Bottom three
Harm Jacobs	"I Don't Want to Be" (Gavin DeGraw)	Safe
Floortje Smit	"Paid My Dues" (Anastacia)	Safe

==== Live Show 6 (4 February 2006) ====
Theme: Disco

Artist	Song (original artists)	Result
Aäron Ayal	"Rock Your Baby" (George McCrae)	Eliminated
Raffaëla Paton	"(Every Time I Turn Around) Back in Love Again" (L.T.D.)	Safe
Harm Jacobs	"That's the Way (I Like It)" (KC and the Sunshine Band)	Safe
Floortje Smit	"Never Can Say Goodbye" (Gloria Gaynor)	Safe
Ellen Eeftink	"Car Wash" (Rose Royce)	Bottom two
Serge Gulikers	"Love Is in the Air" (John Paul Young)	Safe
Angelique Koorndijk	"I'm Every Woman" (Chaka Khan)	Safe

==== Live Show 7 (11 February 2006) ====
Theme: Love Songs

Artist	First song (original artists)	Second song	Result
Floortje Smit	"Love at First Sight" (Kylie Minogue)	"Never Knew Love Like This Before" (Stephanie Mills)	Safe
Serge Gulikers	"Supreme" (Robbie Williams)	"It Must Be Love" (Madness)	Eliminated
Raffaëla Paton	"Love Is All" (Roger Glover)	"Dreamlover" (Mariah Carey)	Bottom three
Ellen Eeftink	"Can You Feel the Love Tonight" (Elton John)	"This Love" (Maroon 5)	Bottom two
Angelique Koorndijk	"Why Do Fools Fall in Love" (Diana Ross)	"My Love Is Your Love" (Whitney Houston)	Safe
Harm Jacobs	"Do You Love Me" (The Contours)	"Radar Love" (Golden Earring)	Safe

==== Live Show 8 (18 February 2006) ====
Theme: Dutch Hits

Artist	First song (original artists)	Second song	Result
Harm Jacobs	"Iedereen is van de wereld" (The Scene)	"Smoorverliefd" (Doe Maar)	Eliminated
Ellen Eeftink	"Niemand" (Re-Play)	"Je hoeft niet naar huis vannacht" (Marco Borsato)	Bottom two
Floortje Smit	"Hartslag" (Ruth Jacott)	"Nog één kans" (Vera Mann)	Safe
Raffaëla Paton	"Wereld zonder jou" (Marco Borsato & Trijntje Oosterhuis)	"Ik kan het niet alleen" (De Dijk)	Safe
Angelique Koorndijk	"Hemel en aarde" (Edsilia Rombley)	"Never nooit meer" (Gordon & Re-Play)	Safe

==== Live Show 9 (25 February 2006) ====
Theme: Big Band

Artist	First song (original artists)	Second song	Result
Ellen Eeftink	"Bad, Bad Leroy Brown" (Frank Sinatra)	"Got to Get You into My Life" (Earth, Wind & Fire)	Safe
Angelique Koorndijk	"Shackles (Praise You)" (Mary Mary)	"Dream a Little Dream of Me" (Mama Cass)	Eliminated
Floortje Smit	"Can't Take My Eyes Off You" (Frankie Valli)	"You Might Need Somebody" (Shola Ama)	Safe
Raffaëla Paton	"My Lovin' (You're Never Gonna Get It)" (En Vogue)	"Straighten Up and Fly Right" (Nat King Cole)	Bottom two

==== Live Show 10: Semi-final (4 March 2006) ====
Theme: Choices

Artist	First song (original artists)	Second song	Third song	Result
Raffaëla Paton	"Think" (Aretha Franklin)	"Mijn houten hart" (De Poema's)	"Don't Cha" (The Pussycat Dolls)	Safe
Ellen Eeftink	"I Still Haven't Found What I'm Looking For" (U2)	"These Words" (Natasha Bedingfield)	"Beast of Burden" (Bette Midler)	Eliminated
Floortje Smit	"It's Raining Men" (The Weather Girls)	"Because of You" (Kelly Clarkson)	"Flashdance... What a Feeling" (Irene Cara)	Safe

==== Live final (11 March 2006) ====
Artist	First song	Second song	Third song	Result
Floortje Smit	"Fame"	"Imagine"	"Right Here, Right Now (My Heart Belongs to You)"	Runner-up
Raffaëla Paton	"Disco Inferno"	"Don't Be Cruel"	"Right Here, Right Now (My Heart Belongs to You)"	Winner

Preceded by Season 2 (2004)	Idols; Season 3 (2005)	Succeeded by Season 4 (2007)
