= Idols 1 =

- Season 1
- Hosted by: Tooske Ragas; Reinout Oerlemans
- Judges: Henkjan Smits; Eric van Tijn; Jerney Kaagman; Edwin Jansen
- Winner: Jamai Loman
- Runner-up: Jim Bakkum

Release
- Original network: RTL 4
- Original release: November 1, 2002 – March 8, 2003

Season chronology
- Next → Idols 2

Idols 1 was the first season of the Dutch version of Idols hosted by Reinout Oerlemans & Tooske Ragas.

The winner was Jamai Loman with Jim Bakkum as runner-up.

== Finals ==
=== Finalists ===
| Finalist | Age * | From | Status |
|---|---|---|---|
| Roger Peterson | 22 | | Withdrew in Week 1 |
| Zosja El Rhazi | 21 | Hilversum | Eliminated 1st in Week 1 |
| Yuli Minguel | 23 | Rotterdam | Eliminated 2nd in Week 2 |
| Joël de Tombe | 21 | Beek en Donk | Eliminated 3rd in Week 3 |
| Bas Nibbelke | 20 | Klazienaveen | Eliminated 4th in Week 4 |
| Marieke van Ginneken | 23 | Breda | Eliminated 5th in Week 5 |
| David Goncalves | 22 | Amsterdam | Eliminated 6th in Week 6 |
| Dewi Pechler | 19 | Scherpenzeel | Eliminated 7th in Week 7 |
| Hind Laroussi | 17 | Gouda | Eliminated 8th in Week 8 |
| Jim Bakkum | 15 | Egmond-Binnen | Runner-up |
| Jamai Loman | 16 | Schoonhoven | Winner |

* as of the start of the season

=== Live show details ===
==== Heat 1 (21 December 2002) ====
| Artist | Song (original artists) | Result |
|---|---|---|
| Leonie van Kuipers | "Don't You Worry 'bout a Thing" (Stevie Wonder) | Eliminated |
| Vanessa Eman | "Out Here on My Own" (Irene Cara) | Eliminated |
| Jamai Loman | "Always on My Mind" (Willie Nelson) | Advanced |
| Hind Laroussi | "From This Moment On" (Shania Twain) | Advanced |
| Hester Paalman | "Have a Little Faith in Me" (John Hiatt) | Eliminated |
| Elton de Kom | "Waiting for You" (Elton de Kom) | Eliminated |
| Jelleke van Berkel | "Fading Like a Flower (Every Time You Leave)" (Roxette) | Eliminated |
| Tialda van Slogteren | "A Woman's Worth" (Alicia Keys) | Eliminated |
| Yuli Minguel | "(You Make Me Feel Like) A Natural Woman" (Aretha Franklin) | Advanced |
| Winne de Leeuw | "The Lady in Red" (Chris de Burgh) | Eliminated |

==== Heat 2 (28 December 2002) ====
| Artist | Song (original artists) | Result |
|---|---|---|
| Tashka Cijntje | "Fallin'" (Alicia Keys) | Eliminated |
| Roger Peterson | "One" (U2) | Advanced |
| Sabine Schulz | "My Heart Will Go On" (Celine Dion) | Eliminated |
| Jim Bakkum | "Jessie" (Joshua Kadison) | Advanced |
| Zosja El Rhazi | "Weak" (Skunk Anansie) | Eliminated |
| Charlotte Bors | "I Want You Back" (The Jackson 5) | Eliminated |
| Sebastiaan Westerhout | "In My Bed" (Dru Hill) | Eliminated |
| Marieke van Ginneken | "Son of a Preacher Man" (Dusty Springfield) | Advanced |
| Louise Looijensteijn | "I'll Be There" (The Jackson 5) | Eliminated |
| Igmar la Reine | "Maybe" (Enrique Iglesias) | Eliminated |

==== Heat 3 (4 January 2003) ====
| Artist | Song (original artists) | Result |
|---|---|---|
| Bas Nibbelke | "When You Say Nothing at All" (Ronan Keating) | Advanced |
| Charlotte Hogeslag | "I Turn to You" (Christina Aguilera) | Eliminated |
| David Goncalves | "Lately" (Stevie Wonder) | Advanced |
| Dewi Pechler | "How Come U Don't Call Me Anymore?" (Alicia Keys) | Advanced |
| Graziëlla Hunsel | "I'm Every Woman" (Chaka Khan) | Eliminated |
| Joël de Tombe | "I Need You Tonight" (Backstreet Boys) | Eliminated |
| Linda Schilder | "You Are the Dream" (Ilse DeLange) | Eliminated |
| Roy van Iersel | "Flying Without Wings" (Westlife) | Eliminated |
| Suze van der Sluis | "Man! I Feel Like a Woman!" (Shania Twain) | Eliminated |
| Yvette de Bie | "Somebody Else's Guy" (Jocelyn Brown) | Eliminated |

==== Live Show 1 (11 January 2003) ====
Theme: Number 1 Hits

| Artist | Song (original artists) | Result |
|---|---|---|
| Hind Laroussi | "First Time" (Robin Beck) | Safe |
| Jamai Loman | "(Everything I Do) I Do It for You" (Bryan Adams) | Safe |
| Zosja El Rhazi | "What's Up" (4 Non Blondes) | Eliminated |
| Bas Nibbelke | "Losing My Religion" (R.E.M.) | Safe |
| Dewi Pechler | "Killing Me Softly" (The Fugees) | Safe |
| David Goncalves | "Wind of Change" (Scorpions) | Bottom two |
| Joël de Tombe | "Easy Lover" (Philip Bailey & Phil Collins) | Bottom three |
| Marieke van Ginneken | "Stop!" (Sam Brown) | Safe |
| Jim Bakkum | "Under the Bridge" (Red Hot Chili Peppers) | Safe |
| Yuli Minguel | "I Wanna Dance with Somebody (Who Loves Me)" (Whitney Houston) | Safe |

==== Live Show 2 (18 January 2003) ====
Theme: Soundtracks

| Artist | Song (original artists) | Result |
|---|---|---|
| Yuli Minguel | "Don't Let Go (Love)" (En Vogue) | Eliminated |
| Bas Nibbelke | "Circle of Life" (Elton John) | Bottom three |
| David Goncalves | "Say You, Say Me" (Lionel Richie) | Safe |
| Dewi Pechler | "Lady Marmalade" (Christina Aguilera, Pink, Lil' Kim & Mýa) | Safe |
| Hind Laroussi | "Colors of the Wind" (Vanessa Williams) | Safe |
| Jamai Loman | "Love Is All Around" (Wet Wet Wet) | Safe |
| Jim Bakkum | "Against All Odds (Take a Look at Me Now)" (Phil Collins) | Safe |
| Joël de Tombe | "Gangsta's Paradise" (Coolio) | Safe |
| Marieke van Ginneken | "Ease On down the Road" (Diana Ross & Michael Jackson) | Bottom two |

==== Live Show 3 (25 January 2003) ====
Theme: Top 40 Hits

| Artist | Song (original artists) | Result |
|---|---|---|
| Dewi Pechler | "Stronger" (Sugababes) | Safe |
| Joël de Tombe | "Like I Love You" (Justin Timberlake) | Eliminated |
| Jamai Loman | "Sorry Seems to Be the Hardest Word" (Elton John) | Safe |
| Marieke van Ginneken | "Sk8er Boi" (Avril Lavigne) | Bottom three |
| David Goncalves | "My Friend" (Groove Armada) | Bottom two |
| Bas Nibbelke | "We've Got Tonight" (Ronan Keating & Lulu) | Safe |
| Hind Laroussi | "Feel" (Robbie Williams) | Safe |
| Jim Bakkum | "Cry Me a River" (Justin Timberlake) | Safe |

==== Live Show 4 (1 February 2003) ====
Theme: Dutch Hits

| Artist | Song (original artists) | Result |
|---|---|---|
| Jamai Loman | "De vleugels van mijn vlucht" (Paul de Leeuw) | Safe |
| Hind Laroussi | "Stil in mij" (Van Dik Hout) | Safe |
| David Goncalves | "Kon ik maar even bij je zijn" (Gordon Heuckeroth) | Safe |
| Bas Nibbelke | "Annabel" (Hans de Booij) | Eliminated |
| Marieke van Ginneken | "Margherita" (Marco Borsato) | Safe |
| Jim Bakkum | "Zij maakt het verschil" (De Poema's) | Bottom two |
| Dewi Pechler | "Een moment zonder jou" (Nasty) | Safe |

==== Live Show 5 (8 February 2003) ====
Theme: Swinging 80's

| Artist | Song (original artists) | Result |
|---|---|---|
| Marieke van Ginneken | "Walking on Sunshine" (Katrina and the Waves) | Eliminated |
| Jim Bakkum | "Crazy Little Thing Called Love" (Queen) | Safe |
| David Goncalves | "All Night Long (All Night)" (Lionel Richie) | Safe |
| Dewi Pechler | "Let's Hear It for the Boy" (Deniece Williams) | Bottom two |
| Jamai Loman | "Relight My Fire" (Dan Hartman) | Safe |
| Hind Laroussi | "Upside Down" (Diana Ross) | Safe |

==== Live Show 6 (15 February 2003) ====
Theme: Love Songs

| Artist | Song (original artists) | Result |
|---|---|---|
| Jim Bakkum | "When a Man Loves a Woman" (Percy Sledge) | Bottom two |
| Jamai Loman | "Always" (Bon Jovi) | Safe |
| David Goncalves | "Nothing's Gonna Change My Love for You" (Glenn Medeiros) | Eliminated |
| Hind Laroussi | "The Power of Love" (Jennifer Rush) | Safe |
| Dewi Pechler | "What's Love Got to Do with It" (Tina Turner) | Safe |

==== Live Show 7 (22 February 2003) ====
Theme: People's Choice

| Artist | First song (original artists) | Second song | Result |
|---|---|---|---|
| Hind Laroussi | "Heaven" (Bryan Adams) | "How Will I Know" (Whitney Houston) | Safe |
| Jim Bakkum | "Uptown Girl" (Billy Joel) | "Hero" (Enrique Iglesias) | Bottom two |
| Dewi Pechler | "Beautiful" (Christina Aguilera) | "Objection (Tango)" (Shakira) | Eliminated |
| Jamai Loman | "Let's Get Loud" (Jennifer Lopez) | "Angels" (Robbie Williams) | Safe |

==== Live Show 8: Semi-final (1 March 2003) ====
Theme: Contestant's Choice

| Artist | First song (original artists) | Second song | Result |
|---|---|---|---|
| Jamai Loman | "If You Don't Know Me by Now" (Simply Red) | "Celebration" (Kool & the Gang) | Safe |
| Hind Laroussi | "Get Here" (Oleta Adams) | "Bad Girls" (Donna Summer) | Eliminated |
| Jim Bakkum | "I'll Be" (Edwin McCain) | "Proud Mary" (Creedence Clearwater Revival) | Safe |

==== Live final (8 March 2003) ====
| Artist | First song | Second song | Third song | Result |
|---|---|---|---|---|
| Jim Bakkum | "Under the Bridge" | "Your Song" | "Tell Her" | Runner-up |
| Jamai Loman | "Sorry Seems to Be the Hardest Word" | "Your Song" | "Step Right Up" | Winner |

| Preceded by Inaugural | Idols; Season 1 (2003) | Succeeded by Season 2 (2004) |
