= Idols (Dutch TV series) =

Dutch TV series

Idols Netherlands
- Idols Netherlands Finalists (with dates of elimination)
- Season 1 (2003)
Jamai Loman	Winner
Jim Bakkum	9 March
Hind Laroussi	2 March
Dewi Pechler	23 February
David Gonçalves	16 February
Marieke Van Ginneken	9 February
Bas Nibbelke	2 February
Joël De Tombe	26 January
Yuli Minguel	19 January
Zosja El Rhazi	12 January
- Season 2 (2004)
Boris Titulaer	Winner
Maud Mulder	1 May
JK	24 April
Marlies Schuitenmaker	17 April
Irma Van Pamelen	10 April
Eric Bouwman	3 April
Alice Hoes	27 March
Ron Link	20 March
Robin Zijlstra	13 March
Meike Hurts	6 March
- Season 3 (2006)
Raffaëla Paton	Winner
Floortje Smit	March 11
Ellen Eeftink	March 4
Angelique Koorndijk	February 25
Harm Jacobs	February 18
Serge Gulikers	February 11
Aäron Ayal	February 4
Marescha van der Stelt	January 28
Christon Kloosterboer	January 21
I-Jay Cairo	January 14
Charissa van Veldt	January 7
Ariël Sietses	December 31
Renske van der Veer	December 31
- Season 4 (2008)
Nikki Kerkhof	Winner
Nathalie Makoma	March 1
Charlene Meulenberg	February 23
Nigel Brown	February 16
Neil Hendriks	February 9
Pauline Zurlohe	February 2
Tiffany Maes	January 26
Bas van Rijckevorsel	January 19
Mirjam de Jager	January 12
Asnat Ferdinandus	January 5
Ollie Du Croix	December 29
Sandy Goeree	December 22
- Season 5 (2016)
Nina den Hartog	Winner
Kimberley Fransens	June 8
Steve Langreder	June 1
Tom de Visser	June 1
Thijs Roseboom	May 25
Jeffrey Saabeel	May 25
Amber Thijssen	May 18
Rowen Aida Ben Rabaa	May 18
- Season 6 (2017)

Idols is a television show on the Dutch television network RTL 4, which is part of the Idols series based on the popular British show Pop Idol. The show is a contest to determine the best young singer in the Netherlands.

The show is divided in two sections, the first being the audition round, an open audition where everyone who wants to try is allowed to sing. The first couple of shows usually show the worst and the best contenders in these auditions. Once the best are selected, the theater round starts. Here the singers who survived the auditions have to prove they really have what it takes to become an idol. In a couple of shows these performers are narrowed down to just 10 finalists, with each contestant performing live.

In the first 2 seasons there were four judges, but starting with season 3 there are just three. The judges provide critiques of each competitor's performance and determine nine of the ten people who enter the final shows. In the final shows they just comment, but don't have any power anymore. After the first part of the show viewers have around one hour to vote by telephone and text messages to vote for their favorite contestant, later in the night the results of 'Idols' starts in which the results are presented and the contestant with the fewest votes is sent home.

On 5 November the Dutch broadcaster RTL announced a fifth season which will be broadcast on RTL 5 in 2016.

== Season 1 ==
Auditions began in 2002 and were held Zeist, Eindhoven, Hoofddorp, Rotterdam and Assen. 7,626 people auditioned in the debut season.

94 successful auditionees progressed to the next stage at the TheaterHotel De Oranjerie in Roermond, Limburg. In a chorus line of ten, contestants re-audition with a self-chosen song. 50 contestants made the second day of the theatre round where groups based on gender were formed to sing one pre-determined song: "Isn't She Lovely?" (Stevie Wonder) and "I'm So Excited" (The Pointer Sisters), for the males and females respectively.

=== Semi Final Qualifyings ===
From this stage, all shows are broadcast live from Studio 22 in Hilversum.

Top 30
Format: 3 out of 10 making the finals each week + one Wildcard

Date	First	Second	Third
21 December	Jamai Loman	Hind Laroussi	Yuli Minguel
28 December	Jim Bakkum	Roger Peterson^{1}	Marieke Van Ginneken
4 January	Dewi Pechler	Bas Nibbelke	David Gonçalves
8 January (Wildcard)	Joël De Tombe (Judges Choice)		
Notes:^{1} Roger Peterson withdrew with Zosja El Rhazi, who placed 4th in that group, replacing him in the top 10.

=== Finals Elimination Chart ===
Date	Theme	Bottom Three		
12 January	Number 1 hits	Zosja El Rhazi	David Gonçalves	Joël De Tombe
19 January	Soundtracks	Yuli Minguel	Marieke Van Ginneken	Bas Nibbelke
26 January	Top 40 Hits	Joël De Tombe (2)	David Gonçalves (2)	Marieke Van Ginneken (2)
2 February	Dutch Hits	Bas Nibbelke (2)	Jim Bakkum	
9 February	Swinging 80’s	Marieke Van Ginneken (3)	Dewi Pechler	
16 February	Love Songs	David Gonçalves (3)	Jim Bakkum (2)	
23 February	People's Choice	Dewi Pechler (2)	Jim Bakkum (3)	
2 March	Contestant's Choice	Hind Laroussi	Jim Bakkum (4)	
9 March	Finale	Jim Bakkum (5)	Jamai Loman	

== Season 2 ==
Boris Titulaer won the contest, with Maud being the runner-up.

=== Semi Final Qualifyings ===
Top 27
Format: 3 (2 Viewers & 1 Judges Choice) out of 9 making the finals each week + 1 additional Wildcard

Date	First	Second	Judges' Choice
31 January	Marlies Schuitenmaker	Maud Mulder	Ron Link
7 February	Robin Zijlstra	JK	Meike Hurts
14 February	Boris Titulaer	Irma Van Pamelen	Eric Bouwman
21 February (Wildcard)	Alice Hoes (Viewers Choice)	Frank De Graaf (missed out)	Sharon (missed out)

=== Finals Elimination Chart ===
Date	Theme	Bottom Three		
6 March	My Idol	Meike Hurts	Alice Hoes	Irma Van Pamelen
13 March	Motown	Robin Zijlstra	Irma Van Pamelen (2)	Maud Mulder
20 March	Top 40 Hits	Ron Link	Alice Hoes (2)	Eric Bouwman
27 March	Disco	Alice Hoes (3)	JK	Maud Mulder (2)
3 April	Dutch Hits	Eric Bouwman (2)	Irma Van Pamelen (3)	Maud Mulder (3)
10 April	Party	Irma Van Pamelen (4)	Maud Mulder (4)	
17 April	Big Band	Marlies Schuitenmaker	Maud Mulder (5)	
24 April	People's Choice	JK (2)	Maud Mulder (6)	
1 May	Finale	Maud Mulder (7)	Boris Titulaer	

== Season 3 ==
Season 3 started on October 22, 2005 with these notable changes: the two new presenters and the jury now consists of three members instead of the previous four. Raffaëla Paton won the contest, with Floortje being runner-up.

=== Semi Final Qualifyings ===
Top 27
Format: 4 (3 Viewers & 1 Judges Choice) out of 9 making the finals each week + 1 additional Wildcard

Date	First	Second	Third	Judges' Choice
3 December	Floortje Smit	Charissa van Veldt	I-Jay Cairo	Christon Kloosterboer
10 December	Aäron Ayal	Angelique Koorndijk	Ariël Sietses	Renske van der Veer
17 December	Raffaëla Paton	Harm Jacobs	Marescha van der Stelt	Ellen Eeftink
24 December (Wildcard)	Serge Gulikers (Viewers Choice)			

=== Finals Elimination Chart ===
Date	Theme	Bottom Three/Four			
December 31	Birthyear Songs	Renske van der Veer	Ariel Sietses	Charissa van Veldt	
January 7	Dutch Artists	Charissa van Veldt (2)	Marescha van der Stelt	I-Jay Cairo	
January 14	Jukebox	I-Jay Cairo (2)	Ellen Eeftink	Christon Kloosterboer	
January 21	Rock	Christon Kloosterboer (2)	Marescha van der Stelt (2)	Ellen Eeftink (2)	Aäron Ayal
January 28	Hits 2000	Marescha van der Stelt (3)	Aäron Ayal (2)	Angelique Koorndijk	Raffaëla Paton
February 4	Disco	Aäron Ayal (3)	Ellen Eeftink (3)		
February 11	Love Songs	Serge Gulikers	Ellen Eeftink (4)	Raffaëla Paton (2)	
February 18	Dutch Songs	Harm Jacobs	Ellen Eeftink (5)		
February 25	Big Band	Angelique Koorndijk (2)	Raffaëla Paton (3)		
March 4	Choices	Ellen Eeftink (6)	Floortje Smit		
March 11	Finale	Floortje Smit (2)	Raffaëla Paton		

== Season 4 ==
Date	Theme	Bottom Three/Four			
22 December	Las Vegas	Sandy Goeree	Bas van Rijckevorsel		
29 December	80s	Ollie Du Croix	Mirjam de Jager	Nigel Brown	
5 January	Dutch Product	Asnat Ferdinandus	Bas van Rijckevorsel (2)	Nigel Brown (2)	
12 January	Disco	Mirjam de Jager (2)	Tiffany Maes	Bas van Rijckevorsel (3)	Nikki Kerkhof
19 January	Musical	Bas van Rijckevorsel (4)	Tiffany Maes (2)	Neil Hendriks	
26 January	Brit Pop	Tiffany Maes (3)	Nigel Brown (3)		
2 February	Dutch Songs	Pauline Zurlohe	Charlene Meulenberg	Neil Hendriks (2)	
9 February	Love Songs	Neil Hendriks (3)	Nathalie Makoma	Nigel Brown (4)	
16 February	Big Band	Nigel Brown (5)	Charlene Meulenberg (2)		
23 February	Choices	Charlene Meulenberg (3)	Nathalie Makoma (2)		
1 March	Finale	Nathalie Makoma (3)	Nikki Kerkhof		

== Season 5 ==
Auditions began in January 2016 and were held Novotel Schiphol Airport in Hoofddorp. The first audition show attracted a record-breaking 1.5 million viewers.

93 contestants progressed to the next stage at Theater de Kom in Nieuwegein, Utrecht. In a chorus line of ten, contestants re-audition with a pre-selected song. The songs were "Stay with Me" by Sam Smith, "Chandelier" by Sia, "Stitches" by Shawn Mendes, and "Hello" by Adele. 35 contestants advanced to the second theatre round where groups of three or four had to perform a pre-determined song, either "Marvin Gaye" by Charlie Puth ft. Meghan Trainor, "Never Forget You" by MNEK & Zara Larsson or "Sexy als ik dans" by Nielson. Twenty contestants progressed to the next stage.

The next round took place on Bali. First, the contestants had to perform a duet. Half of the contestants were eliminated. The remaining ten entered an acoustic piano round in which they performed a song of their choice. Two more contestants were sent home, narrowing the number of contestants down to eight that will enter the live shows.

During each live show, two contestants were sent home until two finalists remained. These two finalists faced off in a final during which viewers at home could cast their vote.

Date	Theme	Bottom Three/Four		
18 May	This is me	Amber Thijssen	Rowen Aida Ben Rabaa	Jeffrey Saabeel
25 May	Heroes	Jeffrey Saabeel	Thijs Roseman	Tom de Visser
1 June	Semi-final	Tom de Visser	Steve Langreder	—N/a
8 June	Final	Kimberley Fransens	Nina den Hartog	

== Judges ==
- Edwin Jansen (2003–2004)
- Henkjan Smits (2003–2006)
- Eric van Tijn (2003–2008)
- Jerney Kaagman (2003–2008)
- John Ewbank (2008)
- Gordon Heuckeroth (2008)
- Martijn Krabbé (2016–2017)
- Ronald Molendijk (2016–2017)
- Jamai Loman (2016–2017)
- Eva Simons (2016–2017)

== Hosts ==
- Tooske Ragas (2003–2004)
- Reinout Oerlemans (2003–2004)
- Chantal Janzen (2006)
- Martijn Krabbé (2006–2008)
- Wendy van Dijk (2008)
- Ruben Nicolai (2016–2017)
- Lieke van Lexmond (2016–2017)
