= Tuscan Wedding =

2014 Dutch film directed by Johan Nijenhuis

- Theatrical release poster
- Directed by: Johan Nijenhuis
- Starring: Simone Kleinsma; Lieke van Lexmond; Jan Kooijman
- Cinematography: Maarten van Keller
- Edited by: Bas Icke
- Music by: André Rieu; Ronald Schilperoort
- Production companies: Johan Nijenhuis & Co
- Distributed by: A-Film Benelux
- Release date: 30 January 2014 (Netherlands)
- Running time: 104 minutes
- Country: Netherlands
- Languages: Dutch; English

Tuscan Wedding (Dutch: Toscaanse Bruiloft) is a 2014 romantic comedy film directed by Johan Nijenhuis.

The film won the Golden Film award after having sold 100,000 tickets. The film also won the Platinum Film award after having sold 400,000 tickets.

The music was composed by Dutch violinist and conductor André Rieu.

== Plot ==
Sanne runs a luxury bed-and-breakfast with her parents on a Tuscan estate surrounded by tall cypress trees. After her own failed marriage, she can’t seem to find another nice man. Divorce lawyer Jeroen isn’t the man of her dreams either. Jeroen has come to Tuscany to organize the wedding of his best friend Bob, a plastic surgeon, to hockey player Lisa. Jeroen doesn’t believe in marriage and has therefore specialized as a divorce lawyer, and because he believes there’s big money to be made in that field. Sanne, however, discovers that behind Jeroen’s facade lies a kind man. Sanne and Jeroen fall in love with each other while organizing the wedding, until Sanne discovers that he recently slept with Lisa, a revelation that nearly causes Bob and Lisa’s upcoming wedding to fall apart. Things finally go well, and Jeroen and Sanne even sleep together. In bed, Sanne warns Jeroen that she doesn’t want to be a “three-date no-contact” (no contact after three dates). Jeroen stops and apologizes, and they don’t see each other again after.

When Sanne’s father Tom unexpectedly suffers a heart attack six months later, Sanne oversees the wedding of her father and stepmother. Shortly after, Tom passes away. Sanne then finds comfort in the Italian Camillo. Camillo helps Sanne forget her grief over Jeroen and her father, and Sanne believes Camillo is the one for her. Sanne then finds comfort in the Italian Camillo. Camillo helps Sanne forget her grief over Jeroen and her father, and Sanne believes Camillo is the one for her. Camillo and Sanne decide to get married, until Jeroen unexpectedly returns with the news that he is going to marry Dominique, Lisa’s sister. Sanne has a hard time accepting the marriage between Jeroen and Dominique, but it seems to work out. But Sanne runs away during the ceremony, distracting the stepmother and preventing the mayor from signing the marriage contract.

At Jeroen and Dominique’s wedding party, Dominique’s mother wants to ask her ex-husband to marry her again, even though they’re divorced. He rejects her, so in a fit of anger she tries to hit him with a piece of meat, but hits the mayor instead. This causes chaos and a fire. Dominique completely loses it. Jeroen has a sudden realization and decides to go after Sanne, who is looking for fire extinguishers. Once in the barn, Jeroen confesses that he can’t forget her and even drove to Italy in the winter after Lisa’s wedding to show his love. But then he saw Camillo and Sanne together and left. Then he confesses that he truly loves her. Before they can kiss, Sanne is called away, and they go back to put out the fire. Amid the white smoke, Sanne kisses Jeroen after all. The smoke clears, and the whole family sees it happen. Dominique is out for revenge, but she can’t do anything to him because they aren’t married. Later that evening, Lisa’s parents end up in bed together, and Camillo breaks up with Sanne.

A year later, everyone is gathered together again, this time for Jeroen and Sanne’s wedding. Lisa and Bob now have a one-year-old child, and Dominique is in a relationship with Erik, Bob’s brother. Jeroen and Sanne finally tie the knot and go on their honeymoon in a hot air balloon.

== Cast ==
- Sophie van Oers as Sanne Klaartje van Straaten
- Jan Kooijman as Jeroen Gerben Beukering
- Simone Kleinsma as Marla van den Boomgaard
- Ernst Daniël Smid as Tom Hendrik van Straaten
- Diederik Ebbinge as Robert Frederik 'Bob' van Aspen
- Lieke van Lexmond as Lisa Frederique Marianna Geertruida Leidekker
- Dirk Zeelenberg as Koos Leidekker
- Martine Sandifort as Bella
- Carolien Spoor as Dominique Maria Leidekker
- Ruud Feltkamp as Erik van Aspen
- Matteo van der Grijn as Camillo
- Alessandro Bressanello as Burgemeester Vittorio Bellamonti
- Joy Wielkens as Lot
- Medi Broekman as Marjolein
