= Makoma =

Congolese Christian musical group

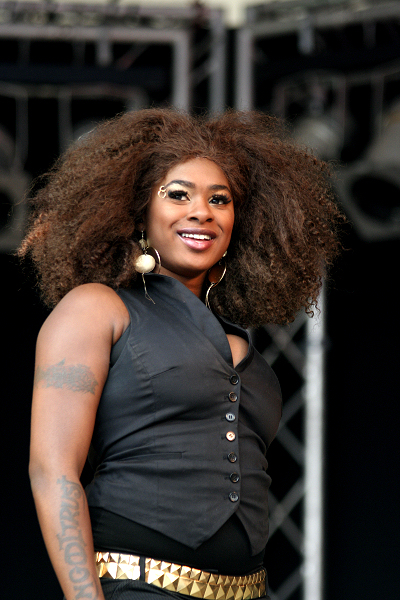
- Nathalie Makoma in 2008

Background information
- Also known as: Nouveau Testament (original name)
- Origin: Democratic Republic of Congo
- Genres: Contemporary Christian music; gospel; Congolese rumba; soukous; ndombolo; hip-hop; reggae; soul; pop; R&B
- Years active: 1993–present
- Labels: Westcoast Music Production; ZYX Music; Breeze Dance Division; JPS Production; Disques Musicanova; BC3 Media Limited; The Lion Records
- Members: Nathalie Makoma; Annie Makoma; Duma Makoma; Martin Makoma; Pengani Makoma; Tutala Makoma
- Past members: Patrick Badine

Makoma is a Congolese Christian musical band composed of members of the Makoma family. It consisted of lead and backing vocalists Nathalie, Annie, and Pengani, alongside Duma, Martin, and Tutala, who also performed rap, and they were later joined in the late 1990s by non-family member Patrick Badine as a rapper and backing vocalist. Performing in Lingala, English, French, Dutch, and German, they are regarded as one of the most prominent gospel acts in Africa and among the African diaspora. Their music is a blend of Congolese rumba, soukous, ndombolo, pop, soul, contemporary R&B, hip-hop, and reggae.

The band was founded in 1993 by Tutala and began performing publicly in 1995 under the name Nouveau Testament ("New Testament"). After the family emigrated to Germany in 1985 and subsequently relocated to the Netherlands in 1995, they adopted the name Makoma, which derived from their surname, and released their debut studio album, Nzambe Na Bomoyi, in 1999 through Tutala's Westcoast Studios in Rotterdam. The album sold over one million copies and was supported by the lead single "Napesi", and brought them widespread acclaim across the continent. Their second studio album, Mokonzi Na Bakonzi, was released in 2002 by the Cameroonian label JPS Production and supported by its title track, and in 2004, they underwent a significant transition following Nathalie's departure, who left to pursue a solo career. Nevertheless, she contributed to the third studio album, Na Nzambe Te, Bomoyi Te, which premiered in 2006 through Westcoast Music Production and distributed by Sonima Music.

Their fourth and final studio album, Evolution, was released on 28 January 2012 under BC3 Media Limited. After an extended hiatus, Makoma initially announced a reunion in 2023; however, internal disagreements, particularly Nathalie's reluctance to participate, delayed the effort. On 1 March 2025, the band officially reunited, including all original members.

== History ==
=== 1993–2002: Formation, Nzambe Na Bomoyi, and Mokonzi Na Bakonzi ===
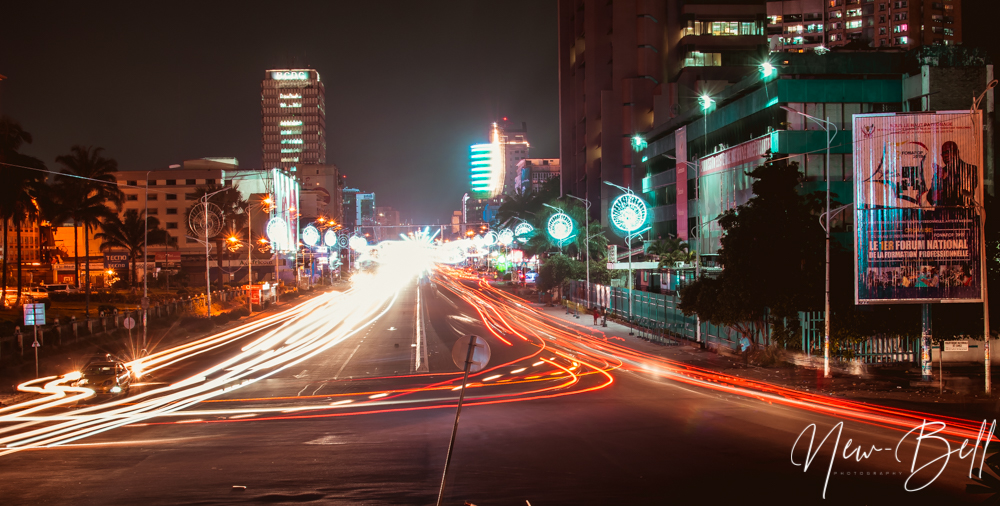
Kinshasa, formerly known as Léopoldville, was the birthplace of the Makoma family.

Makoma was founded in 1993 by Tutala Makoma and began performing publicly as a band in 1995 under the name Nouveau Testament ("New Testament"). The original lineup consisted of six siblings from the Makoma family: Duma, Tutala, Martin, Nathalie, Annie, and Pengani, who performed as lead and backing vocalists. The band traces its musical roots to 1984 when they began singing in church in the Democratic Republic of the Congo with encouragement from their parents, Nzuzi Makoma, a former professional boxer, and their mother, Coco Duma Makoma. The family emigrated to Germany in 1985 and later relocated to the Netherlands in 1995. After their arrival, they faced imminent deportation; however, this was ultimately forestalled after their mother wrote a letter to Queen Beatrix of the Netherlands, resulting in the family being granted citizenship. Following their resettlement in Europe, the band adopted the name Makoma from their surname, and their early reputation in the DRC attracted national attention that culminated in an invitation to perform for President Mobutu Sese Seko.

Makoma recorded their debut album, Nzambe Na Bomoyi, at Westcoast Studios in Rotterdam, owned by Tutala. The record was co-written by Duma and Nathalie and featured vocals by Annie, Dr. Bolia, Martin, and Pengani, while production was helmed by Tutala and André Strässer, who also performed on synthesizer. Around this time, Patrick Badine joined as a rapper, and while the siblings were mainly lead and backing vocalists, Martin, Tutala, and Duma also performed rap sections alongside him. Released in 1999 under Westcoast Music Production and distributed by Distribution Hekina, Nzambe Na Bomoyi departed from their conventional church music by fusing soukous, Congolese rumba, ndombolo, rap, reggae, soul, and pop, and their genre-blending style was met with criticism from conservative religious circles, who considered it "too ungodly". Makoma defended their approach by citing this musical influences from MTV's hip hop, rock, pop, and reggae programming, and despite the backlash, the album was well received, with Ugandan reviewer Joseph Batte of New Vision praising it as "loaded with sultry melodies and dust-stirring grooves". Nzambe Na Bomoyi went on to sell over one million copies, led by the breakout single "Napesi", which achieved significant popularity across Africa. After the album's success, they performed to a full house in Belgium and, by July 2002, "Napesi" had reached the number one position on Uganda's Radio Simba chart. In December 2000, they held major concerts in Libreville, Gabon, including performances at the Cité de la Démocratie and Stade Omar Bongo. That same year, they also toured Côte d'Ivoire. In 2001, Nathalie collaborated with fellow Congolese singer Werrason and Cameroonian saxophonist Manu Dibango on the humanitarian single "Croix Rouge".

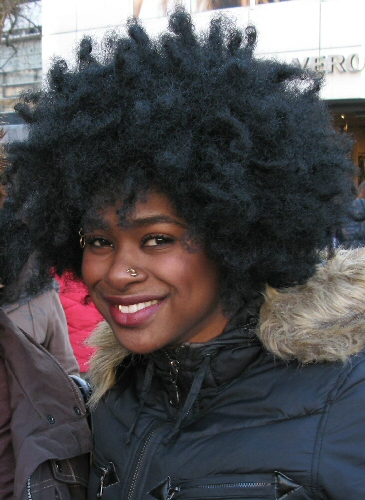
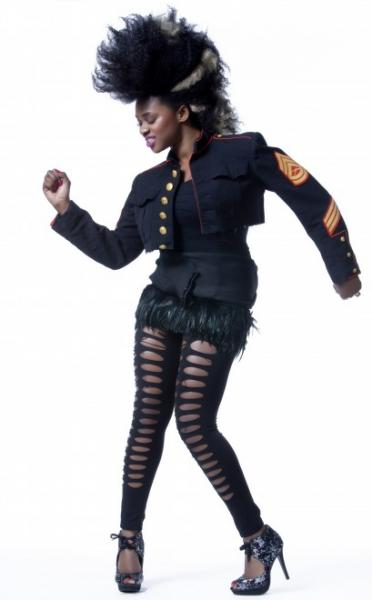
Nathalie Makoma, the band's lead vocalist, is pictured here.

In early 2002, Makoma released their second studio album, Mokonzi Na Bakonzi ("King of Kings"), through JPS Production, a Cameroonian label founded by Jean Pierre Saah. The six-track album was introduced by its title song, which gained critical acclaim across Africa. To promote Mokonzi Na Bakonzi, the band performed in May 2002 at the Palais de la Culture in Abidjan, Côte d'Ivoire. Despite its popularity, Mokonzi Na Bakonzi received limited media coverage and prompted them to produce music videos to enhance its visibility, which were filmed in Montreal and Toronto as well as in various African cities. In September 2002, Makoma embarked on their gospel outreach initiative that targeted African youth, beginning with a performance at the Kenyatta International Conference Centre in Nairobi, Kenya. Given the rampant HIV/AIDS epidemic in Africa, Nathalie emphasized the importance of respecting their bodies as God's temples and combating the rising HIV/AIDS rates. Afterward, they performed in Kitale en route to Kampala, where they played at the Nile Hotel gardens on 13 September and at Nakivubo Stadium on 15 September. Additional performances took place at Rwizi Arch Hotel in Mbarara on 20 September, followed by a show in Mbale at Wash & Wills on the 21st, and wrapped up with a concert at Pastor Robert Kayanja's Lubaga Cathedral on 22 September. Their tour continued with performances in Dar es Salaam, and on 2 November, they received continental recognition when they were awarded Best African Group at the Kora Awards. The next month, during a concert organized by the Rally for Congolese Democracy at the Stade de l'Unité in Goma, chaos erupted when security forces fired shots to facilitate the band's exit. With only one functioning exit, the gunfire caused a crowd crush, which resulted in four deaths, including a 17-year-old girl, and injuries to approximately 30 others.

=== 2003–2008: Performances, internal conflict, and Na Nzambe Te, Bomoyi Te ===
Makoma participated in the official opening ceremony of the 18th edition of the Panafrican Film and Television Festival of Ouagadougou (FESPACO), held from 22 February to 1 March at the Stade du 4 Août in Burkina Faso. They continued their series of international engagements with a concert at the Nile Hotel on 19 April and another at Stade Général Seyni Kountché in Niamey, Niger, on 3 May. Makoma also took part in the fourth edition of the Pan-African Music Festival (FESPAM), co-hosted by Brazzaville and Kinshasa from 2–8 July, where they received the "Amstrong" award for religious music. In June 2003, they performed at the inaugural Ebony Music Festival held at Stade Demba Diop in Dakar, Senegal, which went from 4–6 June.

In 2004, Nathalie, the band's main lead vocalist, left to pursue a solo career. In a 2011 interview with the Congolese newspaper L'Avenir, she revealed that internal family tensions and financial disagreements influenced her decision, stating that despite writing the songs, she had no financial autonomy and faced rejection from her siblings after her departure. She also briefed the press her desire to focus on her personal career and future, including aspirations for marriage and family life.

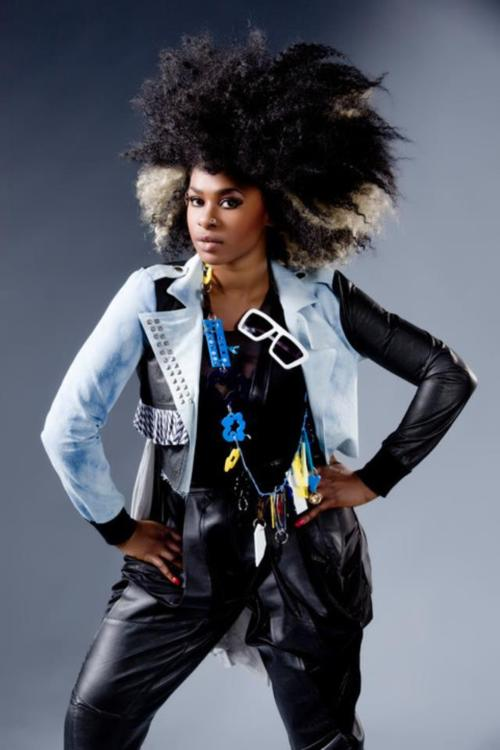
Nathalie in 2012

Despite her exit, Nathalie contributed her vocals to Makoma's third studio album, Na Nzambe Te, Bomoyi Te, which was in the conclusive phases of production by 2005 and included guest appearances from Dorcas Kaja, Dr. Eboko, and René Lokua. In March 2006, they were embroiled in a dispute after a police raid on Tropicana TV, a Kinshasa-based private television station, which was allegedly conducted by armed officers due to the station broadcasting music videos from Makoma's unreleased album without authorization. Two Makoma members were said to have accompanied the police, which led observers to describe the event as a form of punitive expedition involving them. Tropicana TV denied wrongdoing and stated that the videos had been submitted by one of Makoma's producers without restriction. Henriette Kanjinga, the music journalist who received the videos, and news editor Diego Mfisia were later detained. Due to widespread piracy concerns, Na Nzambe Te, Bomoyi Te was ultimately released later in 2006 by Westcoast Music Production and distributed by Sonima Music, a French-African label founded by Mohd Nadim.

=== 2009–present: Nouakchott Olympic Stadium appearance, Evolution, and reunion ===
On 4 April 2009, Makoma performed at the final of the Challenge Sidi Mohamed Abbas, which was an interschool sports competition that was held at Nouakchott Olympic Stadium in Mauritania. The event, which honored the legacy of Sidi Mohamed Abbas, recognized as Africa's best banker in 1994, featured appearances from former football stars Joseph-Antoine Bell (Cameroon), Jay-Jay Okocha (Nigeria), and Cyril Domoraud (Côte d'Ivoire), as well as French rapper Disiz La Peste.

They released their fourth and final studio album Evolution on 28 January 2012 through BC3 Media Limited, featuring ten tracks. After a long hiatus, Makoma announced plans to return in 2023 with a new album commemorating their jubilee. However, internal disagreements resurfaced, with Pengani and other members promoting the reunion, while Nathalie publicly stated that she would not participate. On 1 March 2025, Makoma signaled their official comeback through a cryptic social media video captioned "to be continued". Unlike the 2023 announcement, the 2025 reunion marked the full return of all original members, including Nathalie, and they subsequently scheduled a concert for 24 October at the Dôme de Paris and indicated potential new recordings. Their reformation was reportedly facilitated by a contract for an international tour with French label the Lion Records, which also released Nathalie's 11-track solo album Na Ndimi on 17 October that centered on faith and reconciliation and included a guest appearance by Makoma. Makoma later announced their "Makoma on Tour!" international tour, which began on 15 November in Montreal, followed by a December show in Kinshasa, and continued with dates throughout 2026 across Europe and Africa.

== Awards and nominations ==
Year	Event	Prize	Recipient	Result	Ref.
2002	Kora Awards	Best Group of Africa	Themselves	Won	
2005	South Pacific Award	Best Group	Themselves	Won	

== Discography ==
=== Albums ===
- 1999: Nzambe Na Bomoyi (Jesus For Life)
- 2002: Mokonzi Na Bakonzi (King of Kings)
- 2006: Na Nzambe Te, Bomoyi Te (also known as No Jesus, No Life)
- 2012: Evolution
