= Cees Hamelink =

Dutch academic (born 1940)

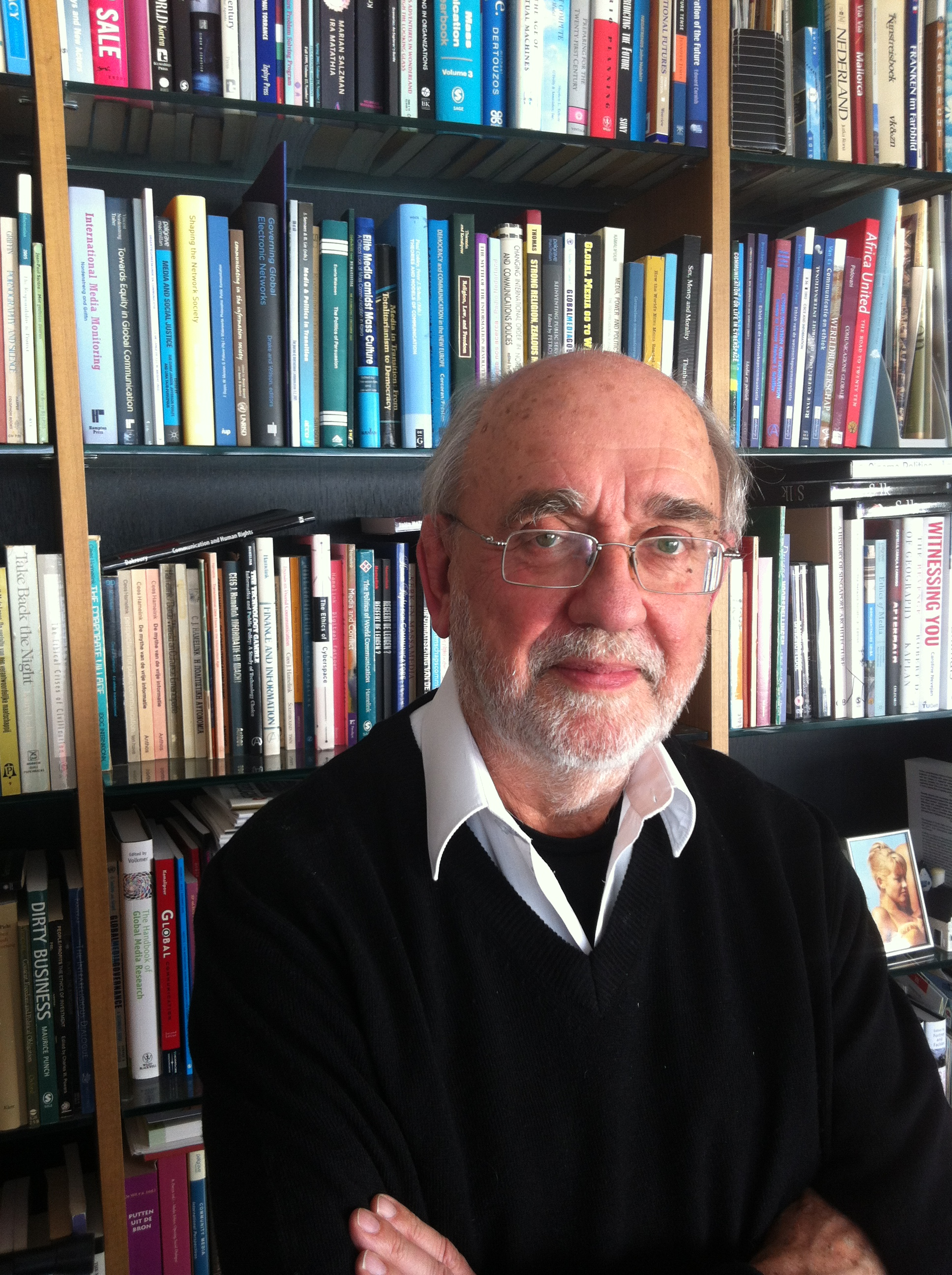
- Born: Cees Jan Hamelink; 14 September 1940 (age 86); Rotterdam, Netherlands
- Occupation: Professor

Academic background
- Education: University of Amsterdam

Cees Jan Hamelink (born 14 September 1940) is a Dutch academic known for his work on communication, culture, and technology. He is emeritus professor of international communications and media at the University of Amsterdam; professor in management information and knowledge at the University of Aruba; and professor of media, religion and culture at the Vrije Universiteit Amsterdam.

He was in a number of boards worldwide; chair of the Dutch League for Human Rights, honorary president of the International Association for Media and Communication Research and chair of Amsterdam World Jazz City 2014.

Hamelink wrote over seventeen books on communication, culture and technology. He is the first scholar outside of the United States to use and conceptualize the notion of information literacy in "An Alternative to News" (1976), a short text proposing a critical conception of literacy along the lines of Brazilian educator Paulo Freire.

Additionally, he is a jazz musician. As a bassist he played in a trio with Louis van Dijk. Since 2008 with Tamara Hoekwater in the Bourgondisch Combo. From 2014-2023, they launched several CDs such as I said yes in the Faculty Club of the University of Amsterdam.

== Publications ==
- Global Communication, London, 2014 ISBN 978-1849-204248
- Media and Conflict, Escalating Evil, 2011 ISBN 1594-516448
- Regeert de leugen?: mediaplichtigheid aan leugen en bedrog, Amsterdam, 2004 (in Dutch) ISBN 978-9053-529485
- Human Rights for Communicators, 2003 ISBN 978-1572-735682
- De leugen regeert: over leugen en bedrog in de informatiesamenleving, tekst inaugurele rede Vrije Universiteit Amsterdam, 2002.(in Dutch)
- The Ethics of Cyberspace, Londen, 2000, vertaling van Digitaal fatsoen: mensenrechten in cyberspace uit 1999 ISBN 978-0761-966685
- Digitaal fatsoen: mensenrechten in cyberspace, Amsterdam, 1999.(in Dutch)
- The Politics of World Communication, 1994.
- Internationale communicatie: arena van internationale conflicten, tekst inaugurele rede Universiteit van Amsterdam, 1984.(in Dutch)
- Informatie en macht: over de samenhang tussen de toegang tot informatie en de uitoefening van maatschappelijke macht, Baarn, 1984.(in Dutch)
- De computersamenleving, Baarn, 1980.(in Dutch)
- Derde wereld en culturele emancipatie, Baarn, 1978.(in Dutch)
- De mythe van de vrije informatie, Baarn, 1978.(in Dutch)
- Perspectives for public communication: a study of the churches' participation in public communication, proefschrift Universiteit van Amsterdam, Baarn, 1975.
