= Tamara Hoekwater =

Dutch singer

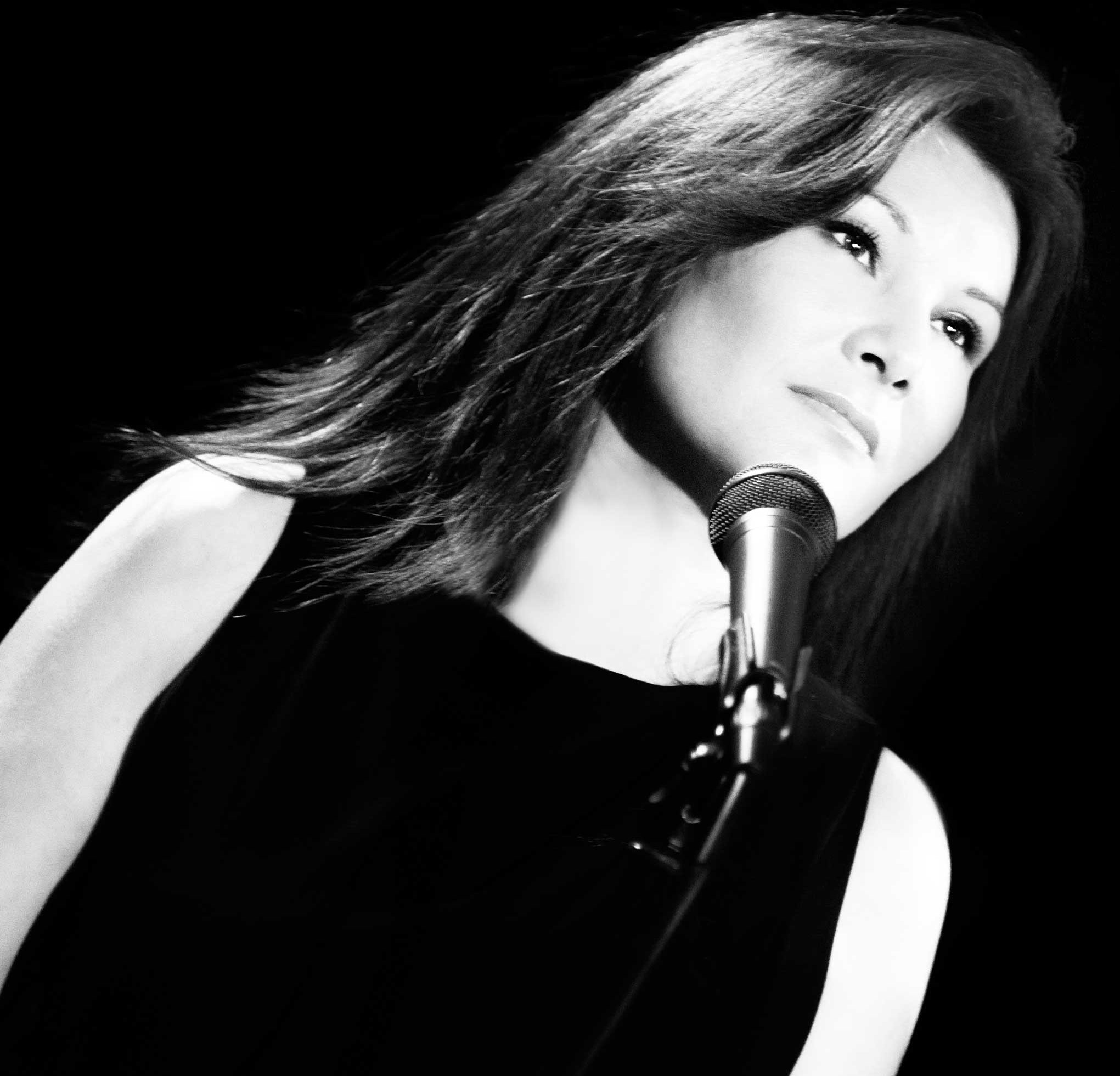

Background information
- Born: Tamara Tessa Eleonora Hoekwater; 1 May 1972 (age 54); Heerlen, Netherlands
- Genres: Pop Jazz
- Years active: 1992–present
- Website: www.volumia.com

Tamara Tessa Eleonora Hoekwater (born 1 May 1972 in Heerlen) is a Dutch singer who performs in Dutch and English. She studied at the Maastricht Academy of Music. From 1992 until 2002 she was the lead singer of pop band Volumia!

After Volumia! she sang at the big band Swing Design. Starting in 2002 she sang in The Jack Million Big-Band, doubling as its manager, performing several times in the United States. On one of these tours, they participated in the Glenn Miller Festival in Clarinda, Iowa. In New York she played with Greg Walker (Santana). At the TV station L1 she presented several programs such as Valuation on Location and Tamara & Birgit.

Today she lives in Amsterdam with her husband Björn Stenvers where she works on her jazz career with Cees Hamelink and their Bourgondisch Combo with performances in the Netherlands and abroad. On 3 October 2014 they launched their CD I said yes and in 2019 Sharing Shearing, Professor & Friends in the Faculty Club of the University of Amsterdam (UvA). From 2015-2022 she performed regularly in Russia with the Maynugin Quartet. From 2016 on she also has a tea- and coffee specialty shop next to the Rembrandt House Museum in Amsterdam.
