= Lieke van Lexmond =

Dutch actress and television presenter

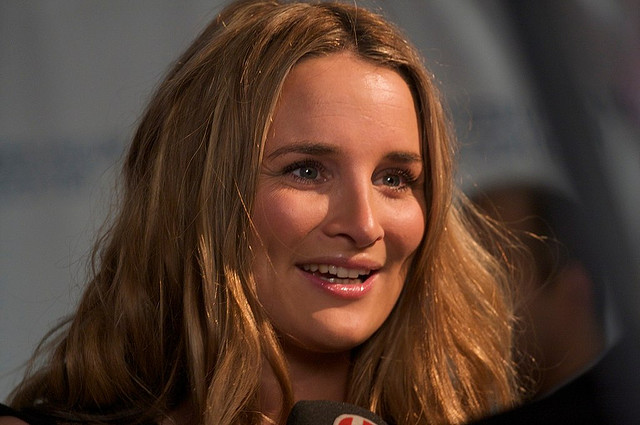
- Lieke van Lexmond (2009)
- Born: 6 February 1982 (age 44); IJsselstein, Netherlands
- Occupations: Actress, presenter

Lieke van Lexmond (born 6 February 1982) is a Dutch actress and television presenter. She is known for playing the roles of Eva Prins in the television series Goudkust and the role of Charlie Fischer in the soap opera Goede tijden, slechte tijden.

== Career ==
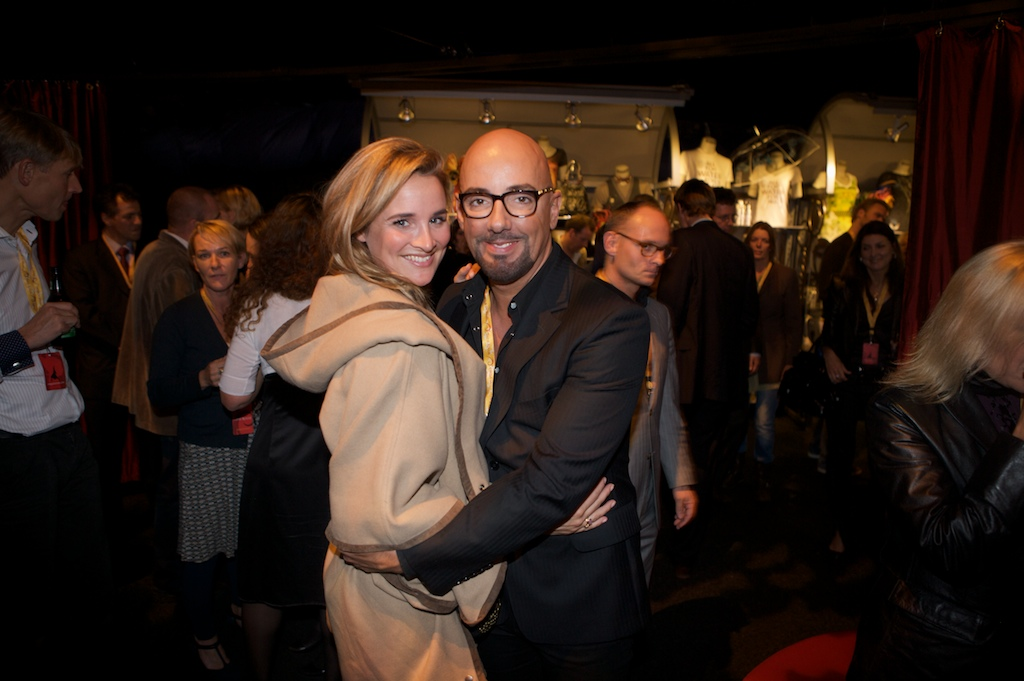
Van Lexmond and Maik de Boer (2010)

Between 2002 and 2011 she played the role of Charlie Fischer in the soap opera Goede tijden, slechte tijden. Initially, she played this role in 2002 for three months to replace Aukje van Ginneken. Van Lexmond became a member of the cast in 2003. In 2011, she decided to leave the soap opera to focus on other projects.

Van Lexmond presented both seasons of The Ultimate Dance Battle in 2011 and 2012. In 2013 and 2014 she was one of the judges in the television series Everybody Dance Now. In 2013, she also presented the television show So You Think You Can Dance: The Next Generation together with Dennis Weening.

In 2012, she participated in an episode of the game show De Jongens tegen de Meisjes.

In 2014, she played a role in the film Tuscan Wedding. In 2015, she played a role in the film Michiel de Ruyter. In the same year, Van Lexmond and Dennis Weening presented the show Blind naar de top in which blind people climb to the top of Mount Kilimanjaro in Tanzania. They also climb the mountain blindfolded themselves.

Van Lexmond presented Idols 5 (2016) and Idols 6 (2017) of the Idols television series together with Ruben Nicolai.

In 2019, Van Lexmond became the host for the television show The Voice Senior. In the same year, she also played a role in the film De Brief voor Sinterklaas. In 2020, she played a role in the film Casanova's directed by Jamel Aattache. She also played a role in the 2022 romantic comedy film Zwanger & Co directed by Johan Nijenhuis.

She returned to the soap opera Goede tijden, slechte tijden in 2025.

== Personal life ==
In September 2014, she gave birth to a son. In April 2017, she gave birth to her second son. She married Bas van Veggel in June 2016; the wedding took place in Italy.

== Selected filmography ==
=== Film ===
- 2014: Tuscan Wedding
- 2015: Michiel de Ruyter
- 2019: De Brief voor Sinterklaas
- 2020: Casanova's
- 2022: Zwanger & Co

=== Television ===
==== Actress ====
- 1998 – 2001: Goudkust
- 2003 – 2012, 2025: Goede tijden, slechte tijden
- 2016 – 2018: Centraal Medisch Centrum

==== Host / presenter ====
- 2011 – 2012: The Ultimate Dance Battle
- 2012 – 2013: Het Zesde Zintuig
- 2013: The Next Generation
- 2015: Blind naar de top
- 2016 – 2017: Idols!
- 2019 – 2021: The Voice Senior

==== Judge ====
- 2013 – 2014: Everybody Dance Now

==== Contestant ====
- 2012: De Jongens tegen de Meisjes
- 2018: Het Perfecte Plaatje
