= John Ewbank (composer) =

Dutch music industry person

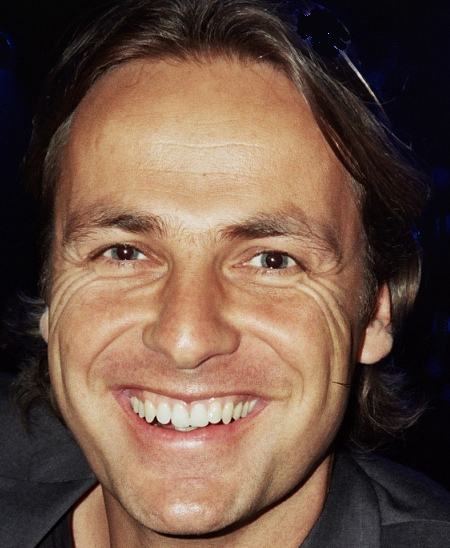
John Ewbank

John Ewbank (born 6 December 1968) is a British-born Dutch composer, lyricist and record producer. He was born in Eastleigh, Hampshire to a British father and a Dutch mother, and moved with his mother to the Netherlands when he was one year old.

He wrote/produced a record number of twenty #1 Dutch Top 40 hit singles, of which fourteen were for Marco Borsato, for whom he has been producing and writing since 1994. They sold over four million albums together in the Benelux. Other artists Ewbank worked with include Ferry Corsten, Trijntje Oosterhuis, VanVelzen, Esmée Denters, Gordon, Paul de Leeuw, Rob de Nijs, Nikki Kerkhof, Hero, Maud Mulder, and Tim Immers.

The first #1 in 1991 with Gordon, "Kon ik maar even bij je zijn" ("If only I could be with you for a short while"), a song which reached the #1 position for the second time in October 2009, when covered by Thomas Berge. In 1996, Ewbank composed the anthem for the opening of the Amsterdam Arena. His music is featured in Quentin Tarantino's True Romance. He composed scores for the films Superstition with Charlotte Rampling and for Floris. In 2002, Ewbank worked with Ferry Corsten on Corsten's latest production under his 'Gouryella' alias, "Ligaya". He also wrote and produced the #1 hit for the Dutch Idols winner Nikki in 2008 ("Hello World").

In April 2013 he was commissioned to compose the official song for the investiture of king Willem-Alexander. The song was released on 19 April, causing much controversy and Ewbank decided to withdraw it due to threats and allegations on social media. A couple of days later, however, the committee plead against the withdrawal of the song. The song went to #1 in all the charts.
