= Maud Mulder =

Dutch singer (born 1981)

Maud Mulder (born 17 November 1981 in Nijmegen, Netherlands) is a Dutch singer who rose to popularity after placing second in Idols Netherlands 2, the Dutch version of Pop Idol, shown by RTL 4. She also played professional field hockey with the Hoofdklasse side NMHC Nijmegen until 2010.

On 12 March 2006, Mulder participated in the national Dutch Song Contest finals. However, the jury considered the three songs she performed to be without any potential for the Eurovision, since they were like many of the Netherlands' previous (unsuccessful) entries. Apart from that, her vocal performances were weak due to an inflammation of the throat. Maud became third out of three, only just beat by rock band Behave.

== Idols performances ==
Top 27: White Flag by Dido
Top 10: Just Like A Pill by Pink
Top 9: Signed Sealed Delivered I'm Yours by Stevie Wonder
Top 8: Don't Say That You Love Me by Trijntje Oosterhuis
Top 7: Blame It On The Boogie by The Jackson 5
Top 6: Afscheid by Volumia!
Top 5: This Is How We Do It by Montell Jordan
Top 5: "Dancing in the Street" by Martha & The Vandellas
Top 4: Making Whoopee by Frank Sinatra
Top 4: Are You Gonna Go My Way? by Lenny Kravitz
Top 3: Thank You by Dido
Top 3: Ain't No Sunshine by Bill Withers
Top 3: Hole In The Head by Sugababes
Grand Final: "Dancing in the Street" by Martha & The Vandellas
Grand Final: When You Think Of Me by Mark Wills

== Discography ==
- Idols Netherlands 2: Greatest Moments
- Wacht Op Mij
  - Zoals Je Naar Me Kijkt
  - Omdat Je Bij Me Blijft
  - Jou/Moe
