= Floortje Smit =

Dutch singer

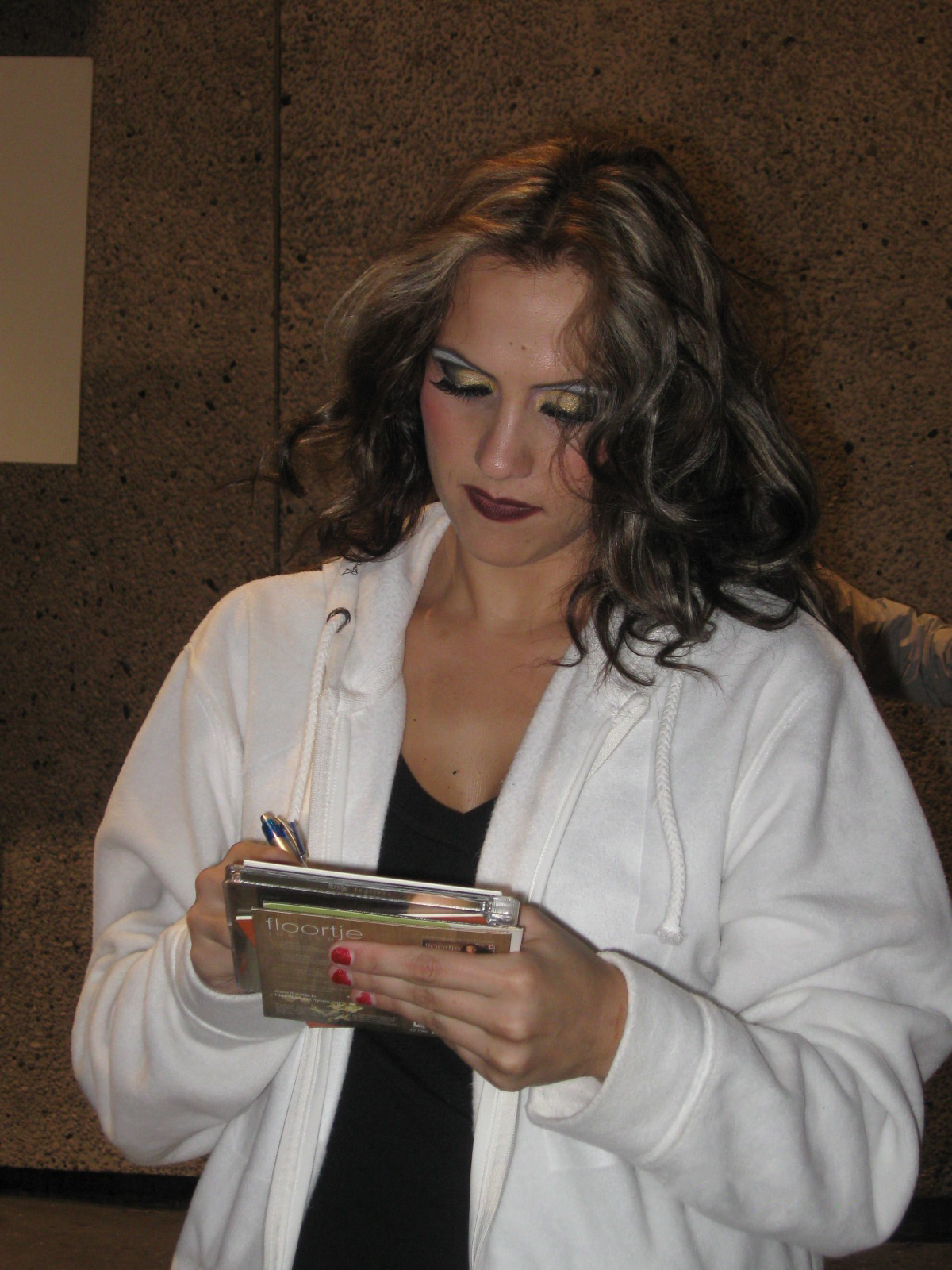
Floortje Smit (2010)

Floortje Smit (born 16 July 1983, in Amsterdam) is a Dutch singer.

== Career ==
=== In Idols ===
Smit's career started in season three of the Dutch TV talent show Idols, the Dutch spin-off of Pop Idol. In a twist, Smit, a audience favorite with her girl-nextdoor image and very popular, Even performed on Koninginnedag for the Dutch queen, lost in the final to Raffaëla Paton. She was an early favorite and that her name was already trademarked before the competition started led to allegations that the show's outcome was predetermined.

=== Solo career ===
Despite losing the competition, she went on to start a music career; her first single, "Wake Up," was performed live for the first time in the municipality of Wijchen where, according to the local paper, she transformed herself from a run-off-the-mill singer into a diva, who gave the audience and the reviewer goosebumps.

She signed with the label The Entertainment Group in May 2006 after being turned down by BMG/Sony, which had an option to sign the runner-up in the competition. Her debut album, Fearless, was released in 2007 and peaked at #43 and stayed on the charts for six weeks. A single from the album, "Starts With Goodbye," was a modest success; another song on the album, "All Over Again," is a duet with boyband singer Ronan Keating.

=== In The Voice ===
She had a comeback in 2012 taking part in season 3 of The Voice of Holland as part of team VanVelzen reaching the Final 4 as the contestant representing him in the finals where she sang Alone and as a duet with her coach mentor VanVelzen the "Sing Sing Sing". She finished third overall in the contest behind winner Leona Philippo (Team Trijntje Oosterhuis) and Johannes Rypma (Team Nick & Simon).

== In popular culture ==
- A multi-talented artist, Smit took part in an ice dancing show on TV, "Sterren Dansen op het IJs", in which she reached the final, but again failed to win.
- She sang and danced in front of 1700 people, at an emotional ceremony where "De Kindercompagnie", a baby store, received the 2008 ING Retail Award.
- She also posed nude for the English men's magazine FHM in 2008.
