= Nikki Kerkhof =

Nikki
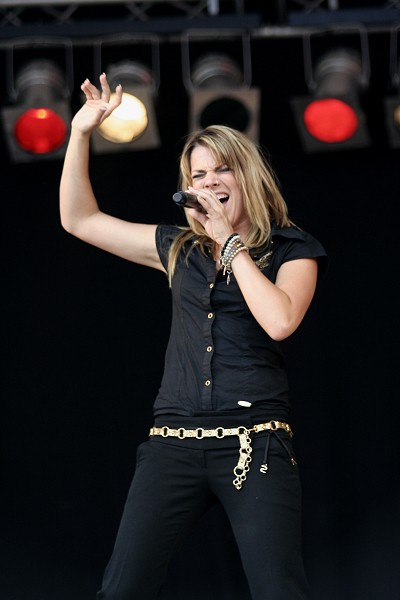

Background information
- Also known as: Nikki, Nikki Nola
- Born: Nicole Kerkhof; 21 December 1983 (age 42); Sint-Oedenrode, Netherlands
- Occupation: Singer
- Years active: 2008—present
- Label: Sony BMG

Nikki Gouman (also known as Nikki Nola; born 21 December 1983) is a Dutch singer and the winner of the fourth series of Idols, the Dutch variant on Pop Idol. On the first of March 2008 she won the singing contest with 62% of all the votes from the other finalist Nathalie Makoma .

Her single "Perfect Day" will also be released in the rest of Europe as her European debut single.

== Idols ==
During the fourth series of Idols, Kerkhof performed the songs:

- Idols4Live: Super Duper Love (Joss Stone)
- Liveshow 1 (Las Vegas): Pretty Vegas (INXS)
- Liveshow 2 (The '80s): Tell It To My Heart (Taylor Dayne)
- Liveshow 3 (Dutch Product): Rain Down On Me (Kane)
- Liveshow 4 (Disco): If I Can't Have You (Yvonne Elliman)
- Liveshow 5 (Musical): Climb Every Mountain (The Sound of Music)
- Liveshow 6 (Britpop): Bleeding Love (Leona Lewis)
- Liveshow 7 (Dutch Songs): Afscheid (Volumia!)
- Liveshow 8 (Love): River Deep, Mountain High (Tina Turner), From This Moment (Shania Twain)
- Liveshow 9 (Bigband): Valerie (Amy Winehouse), I Who Have Nothing (Shirley Bassey)
- Liveshow 10 (Songs selected by Radio 538-DJs): Mesmerized (Faith Evans), All My Life (Krezip)
- Liveshow 11 (Final): River Deep, Mountain High (Tina Turner), When The Spirit Of The Lord (Fred Hammond), Queen Of The Night (Whitney Houston), On My Own (Michael McDonald & Patti LaBelle), "Hello World" (first single).

== Discography ==
Nikki Kerkhof discography
- Studio albums: 2
- Singles: 6
- Music videos: 5
- B-sides: 2

The following is a complete discography of every album and single released by Dutch pop music artist Nikki Kerkhof.

=== Albums ===
Year	Information	Netherlands	Sales and Certifications
2008	Naked: 1st studio album; Released: 24 November 2008; Label: Sony BMG; Format: CD, digital download	16	^{Dutch sales: 64,000; NVPI: Platinum}
2010	Let It Go: 2nd studio album; Released: 21 May 2010; Label: Sony BMG	30	

=== Singles ===
Year	Song	Netherlands	Certification	Album
2008	"Hello World"	1	2xPlatinum (NVPI)	
2008	"This Is Me"	-	-	The Dutch Camp Rock Soundtrack
2008	"Bring Me Down"	6	—	Naked
2009	"What Did I Do"	26	—	Naked
2009	"How to Break a Heart"	43		Naked
2010	"Perfect Day"	45	—	Let It Go
2010	"Can't Stop Thinking About You"	—	—	Let It Go
