= Tooske Ragas =

Dutch actress and television host

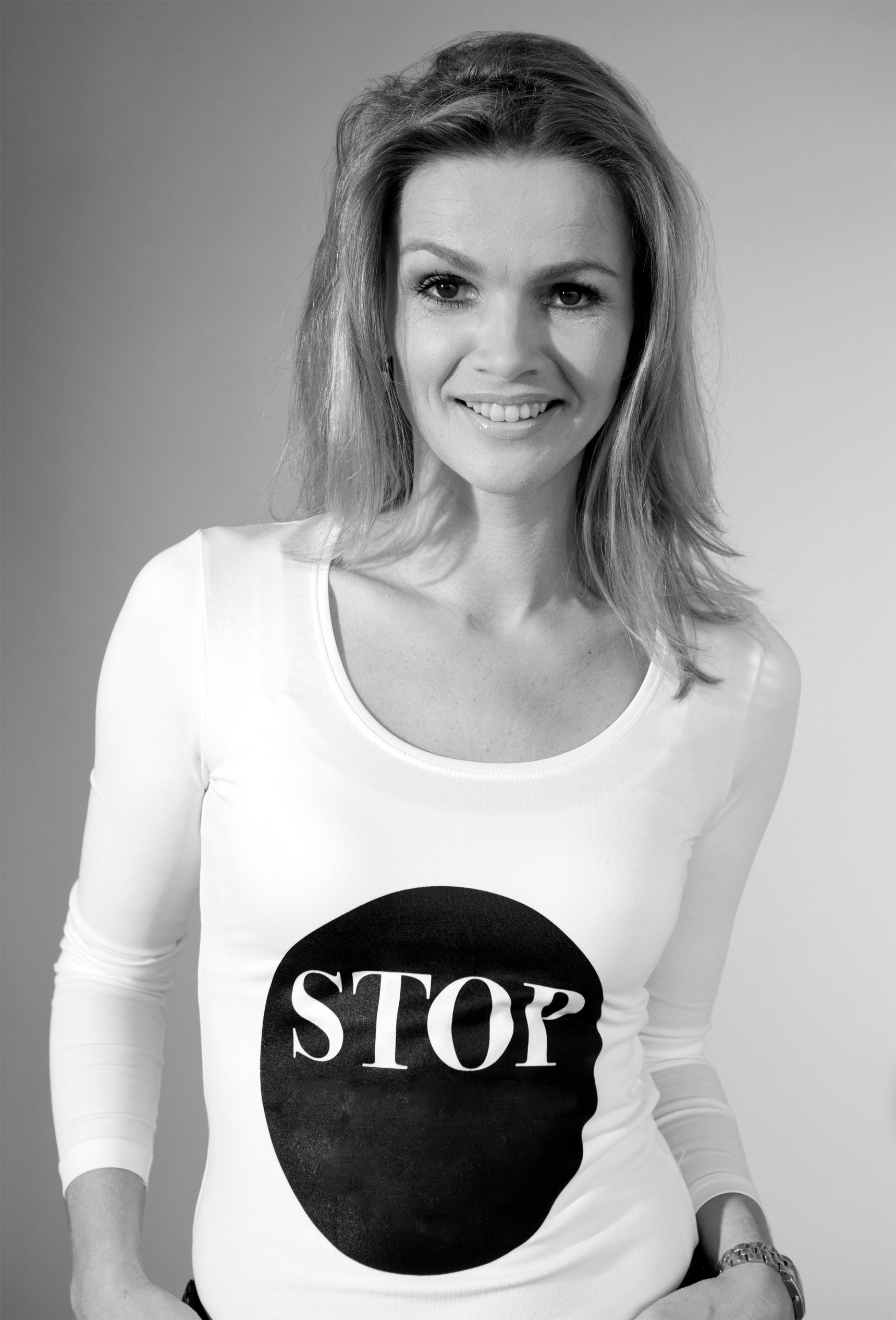
- Ragas in 2013
- Born: Antonia Grietje Breugem; 3 June 1974 (age 51); Zwolle, Netherlands
- Occupation(s): Actress, television host
- Spouses: Keith Davis (m. 2002; div. 2003) Bastiaan Ragas (m. 2005)
- Children: 3

Antonia Grietje "Tooske" Ragas-Breugem (née Breugem; born 3 June 1974), is a Dutch actress and television host. She played a flight attendant in 06/05, a movie by Theo van Gogh about the murder of Pim Fortuyn. She was video jockey (VJ) at TMF Netherlands and presented two seasons of the Dutch and German version of Idols.

== Early life ==
Breugem was born in Zwolle into a Dutch Reformed family, and has two elder brothers, Jaap and Jan-Pieter.

== Career ==
Since her first appearance on television in 1995 on the Soundmixshow, Tooske's career showed a lot of aspects of the Dutch entertainment industry. She was Miss Overijssel, the province she hailed from, in 1996, placed fourth in the Miss Netherlands competition, and was singer in the group Bogy Bogy for two years. Later, she became VJ at TMF Netherlands and MTV, which she was from 1998 until 2002. In 2002, she switched to the larger television channels and became co-host of Idols Netherlands together with Reinout Oerlemans for two seasons at RTL 4.

In 2005, Breugem switched from RTL to the Dutch public television broadcasting association AVRO where she presented the Junior Songfestival, the presentation of the Televisierring and Help, ik word vader! ("Help, I'm becoming a father"). Together with Marco Schreyl she presented the third and fourth season of Deutschland sucht den Superstar, the German Idols version.

In 2006, she switched again, and this time to the commercial broadcaster SBS, where she presented Je wordt bedankt ("Thanks!") in 2006 and Het Beste Idee van Nederland ("The best idea from the Netherlands") in 2007.

Tooske is also known in Germany, but although the Dutch know her as Tooske Breugem, by her maiden name, the Germans know her generally as Tooske Ragas, after her husband. Officially she uses Tooske Ragas-Breugem.

Ragas appeared in a 2015 episode of the game show De Jongens tegen de Meisjes. She appears in the 2022 film Het Feest van Tante Rita. In 2024, she appeared in the 24th season of Wie is de Mol?.

== Personal life ==
On 3 June 2002, Breugem married American Keith Davis, but the couple split up in December 2003. On 25 June 2005, she married the Dutch actor Bastiaan Ragas, who was her co-star in the musical 3 Musketiers. On 13 February 2007, their first daughter was born. Their second daughter was born on 28 May 2008. The third daughter was born on 7 April 2010.
