= Jamai Loman =

Dutch singer (born 1986)

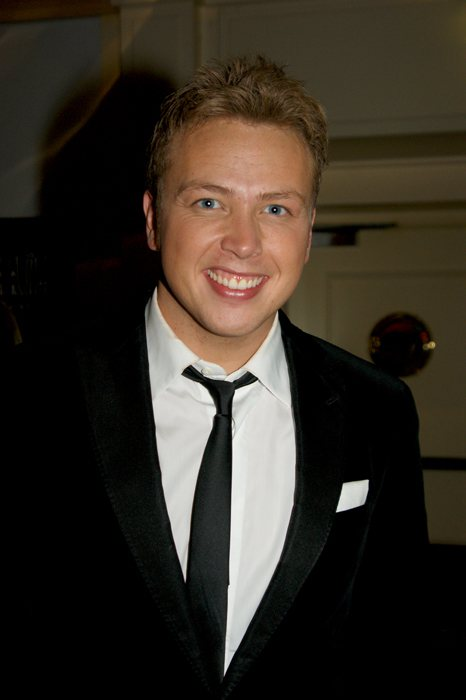

Background information
- Born: Jamai Johannes Loman; 30 June 1986 (age 40); Gouda, South Holland, Netherlands
- Occupations: Singer; actor; television presenter
- Instruments: Singing; piano
- Years active: 2003–present
- Website: http://www.jamaimusic.nl

Jamai Johannes Loman (born 30 June 1986) is a Dutch singer, musical actor and presenter who was the winner of the first series of Idols, the Dutch variant of Pop Idol.

== Biography ==
Loman, who grew up in Schoonhoven with his parents and two elder sisters, Naomi and Chantal, began his artistic journey by participating in a school musical. His passion for performing led him to showcase his talents at the school's "Shownight" in 2000, as well as being a member of the school jazz band called 8CC.

In 2003, he entered the Dutch Idols competition. To his surprise, he progressed through each round and ultimately emerged as the winner. However, at the 2003 World Idol, he only received 36 points and came in last, facing a critical assessment from the jury.

Following the release of his third single, Loman made a pivotal decision to transition from the music industry to acting. He found success in various musical productions, including Doornroosje (Sleeping Beauty), Hello, Dolly! and Jesus Christ Superstar. In January 2007, he took on the role of the Wiz and alternated as the Scarecrow in the musical The Wiz.

In 2008, Loman played the role of Marius in the Dutch revival version of Les Misérables, for which he received a John Kraaijkamp Musical Award for ‘Best Supporting Actor’ in a large musical production.

In 2009, Loman is set to play the part of Bobby Strong in the M-Lab production of Urinetown.

Since 2016, he is one of the jury members of Idols 2016. The other jury members are Eva Simons, Martijn Krabbe and Jeroen Nieuwenhuis.

In 2021, Loman was the winner of the third season of the Dutch version of The Masked Singer as Cupido.

In 2022, he was a co-presenter of the third season of the show Lego Masters.

In February 2026, Loman won the finals of the Dutch version of the amateur conductors challenge TV show Maestro.

== Personal life ==
In late 2003, Loman publicly revealed his sexual orientation during an appearance on Ruud de Wild's radio program confirming his suspicions that he is gay. He stated that he was in a relationship with Boris Schreurs, one of his dancers. Subsequently, Loman was in a relationship with Ron Link which lasted nearly two years before their breakup in November 2008. In 2010, Loman was in a relationship with actor Michael Muller, which ended in April 2012 after more than two years together.

In 2018, Loman had a kidney transplant due to kidney failure.

== Dutch Idols Performances ==
- Top 30: Always on My Mind by Willie Nelson
- Top 10: Everything I Do, I Do It For You by Bryan Adams
- Top 09: Love Is All Around
- Top 08: Sorry Seems To Be The Hardest Word by Elton John
- Top 07: De Vleugels Van Mijn Vlucht
- Top 06: Relight My Fire by Take That
- Top 05: Always
- Top 04: Angels by Robbie Williams
- Top 04: Let's Get Loud by Jennifer Lopez
- Top 03: If You Don't Know Me By Now by Simply Red
- Top 03: Celebration by Kool and The Gang
- Finale: Sorry Seems To Be The Hardest Word by Elton John
- Finale: Your Song by Elton John
- Finale: Step Right Up

== Discography ==
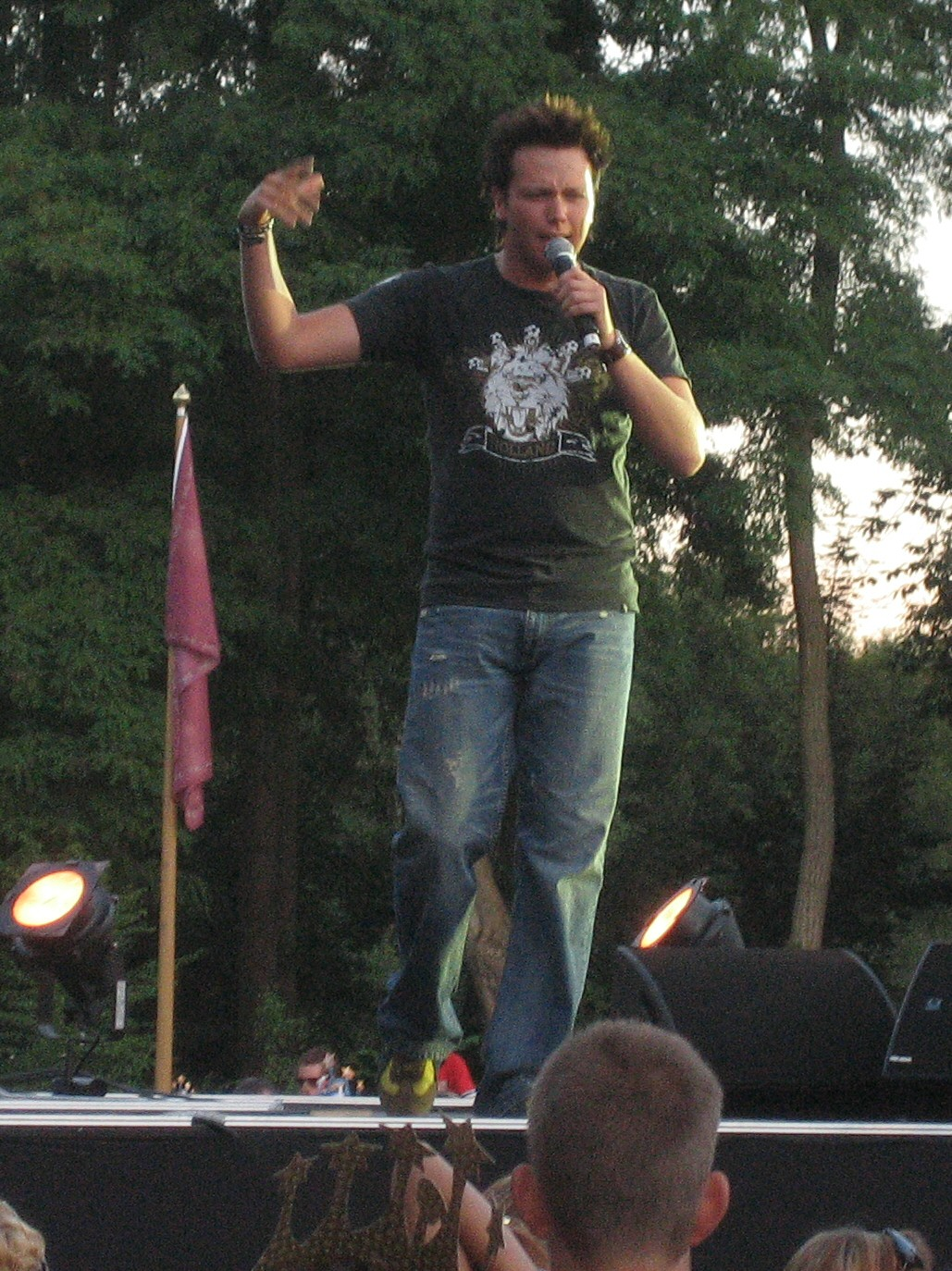
Loman performing in 2006

- 2003 Step Right Up, Single
- 2003 Greatest Moments, Idols Album
- 2003 Jamai, Album
- 2003 When you walk in the room, Single (ft. Dewi, 4th place Idols)
- 2004 Wango Tango, Single
- 2005 Super Guppie zingt, Album starring different artists, in connection with the Dutch "Children's Books Week"
- 2006 Jesus Christ Superstar, Dutch Original Cast Album
- 2018 Genoeg Te Doen, Album

== Theater ==
- 2003 Bij Paul op de koffie, Theater tour with Dutch artist Paul de Leeuw
- 2004 Musical Doornroosje (Sleeping Beauty), Jonathan, Nationale Tour, Studio 100
- 2004–2005 Hello, Dolly!, Barnaby Tucker, Dutch tour
- 2005–2006 Jesus Christ Superstar, Simon Zealotes, Nationale Tour, Joop van den Ende theaterproducties/Stage-entertainment
- 2006 Musicals in Ahoy' – Rotterdam Ahoy
- 2006–2007 The Wiz, Scarecrow en The Wiz, Beatrix Theater Utrecht, Joop van den Ende Theaterproducties/Stage Entertainment
- 2008 Les Misérables, Marius, Luxor Theater Rotterdam – Royal Theatre Carré Amsterdam, Joop van den Ende theaterproducties/Stage-entertainment
- 2009 Urinetown, Bobby Strong, M-Lab
- 2009–2010 Disney Musical Sing a long, Soloist.
- 2010 Joseph and the amazing technicolor dreamcoat, Alternate Joseph, Joop van den Ende Theaterproducties.
- 2010–2011 Urinetown, Bobby Strong, Nationale Tour, Joop van den Ende theaterproducties/Stage-entertainment
- 2011 Maria!, Teunis, M-lab Amsterdam
- 2011–2012 De Winnaar, M-Lab Amsterdam
- 2012 Droomvlucht, Krakeel, Theater De Efteling, Joop van den Ende Theaterproducties/Stage Entertainment
- 2012 Miss Saigon, Chris, Beatrix Theater Utrecht, Joop van den Ende Theaterproducties/Stage Entertainment
- 2012–2013 Shrek, Heer Farquaad, RAI Theater Amsterdam en Nationale Tour, Albert Verlinde Entertainment

== Awards ==
- In 2003, Loman won the "Gouden Vedel", a price awarded by the Dutch Association of Dancing Teachers to artists who release a good dance record. He received this award for his single Step Right Up, used in dancing classes for learning the cha-cha-cha.
- Loman won the "John Kraaijkamp Musical Award 2005" for Best Upcoming Talent, for his role of Barnaby Tucker in Hello, Dolly!. The Award includes a scholarship of Euro10,000.
- Nominated for the "John Kraaijkamp Musical Award 2006" for Best Male Supporting Role for Simon in Jesus Christ Superstar.
- In 2008, Loman won the "John Kraaijkamp Musical Award 2008" for Best Male Supporting Role for Marius Pontmercy in Les Misérables.

== Miscellaneous ==
- In October 2006, Loman started presenting the children's Television program Jetix Max, together with actress Nicolette van Dam.
- In December 2006, he dubbed the voice for penguin Mumble in the animated movie Happy Feet.
- Loman has been an Ambassador for the Make-A-Wish Foundation in the Netherlands since May 2004.
- In July 2009, Loman was announced the winner of the fourth season of the Dutch Dancing with the Stars.
- From July till August 2009 Loman is also co-presenting the "waar is Elvis" (where is Elvis) television show for RTL4.

Preceded by None	Idols (Netherlands); Winner; Season 1 (2003)	Succeeded by Boris Titulaer
Preceded by Helga van Leur & Marcus van Teijlingen	Dancing with the Stars winner Season 4 (2009 with Gwyneth van Rijn)	Succeeded by ?
