= Volumia! =

Dutch band

Volumia! was a band from Heerlen, Netherlands. They started as a cover band and later developed an original repertoire of Dutch songs. The band existed from 1993 until 2002. They reached the Dutch Top 40 many times, scored a number of awards and golden records.

After 2002 several band members started a solo career. Lead singer Xander de Buisonje launched a solo CD in the Netherlands and Belgium. Saxophone player Harold Mingels from The Hague played with the Crazy Piano's and later on in his own group The Corona's. Singer Tamara Hoekwater presented several programs for TV network L1, sang with the Big Bands Swing Design with Greg Walker (Santana) and The Jack Million Band in Northern America. Today she lives in Amsterdam and performs jazz music.

== Awards ==
- 2002 - Double Platinum - PUUR
- 2002 - Platinum - WAKKER
- 2002 - Gold - WAKKER
- 2001 - Gold - PUUR
- 2000 - Platinum - Volumia!
- 1999 - Gold - Volumia!
- 1999 - Double Platinum - Volumia!
- 1998 - Gold - PUUR
- 1998 - Gold - Volumia!
- (4 TMF Awards, 1 Rembrandt Award)
