= Martijn Krabbé =

Dutch radio and television presenter (born 1968)

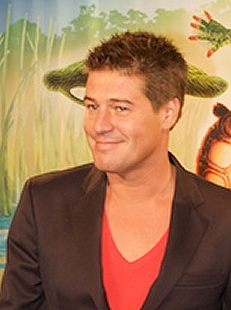
- Born: Martijn Joop Krabbé; 26 March 1968 (age 58); Amsterdam, Netherlands
- Spouse: Amanda Beekman (1995–1999; 2005–2014) Deborah Wietzes (2019-)
- Children: 4
- Parent: Jeroen Krabbé
- Presenting career
- Station: RTL 4
- Network: RTL
- Country: Netherlands

Martijn Joop Krabbé (born 26 March 1968) is a Dutch radio and television presenter. He won the Televizier-Ring Presentator award for best presenter in 2025.

== Career ==
Krabbé started his career in Dutch media as a 19-year-old in the Dutch TV programme "Popformule". Later he hosted several Dutch television programmes such as Idols (the Dutch version of Pop Idol) and the Dutch version of The X Factor, Dancing on Ice and The Voice of Holland.

In 2019, he was the narrator in that year's edition of The Passion, a Dutch Passion Play held every Maundy Thursday since 2011.

In June 2025, Krabbé received the Media Oeuvre Award. He won the Televizier-Ring Presentator award for best presenter in 2025. He won the Voice Over Award in 2026.

In 2026, multiple people became presenters of the ninth season of the show Kopen Zonder Kijken, including Caroline Tensen, Marieke Elsinga and Chantal Janzen, after Krabbé was no longer able to present the show due to his health. Krabbé did the voice-over. In the show, people purchase a home without having seen it first and the team of Kopen Zonder Kijken makes all relevant decisions based on budget and preferences. In May 2026, Chantal Janzen succeeded him as presenter of the show for the tenth season.

Krabbé renewed his contract with RTL in November 2026.

== Personal life ==
His father is actor and director Jeroen Krabbé. He was married twice to Amanda Beekman; from 1995 to 1999 and from 2005 to 2014. They have two sons and two daughters. He is a nephew of Tim Krabbé.

On 5 March 2024, Krabbé posted on his social media that he was diagnosed with cancer. On 15 January 2025 Martijn and his daughter Michelle gave an interview to Linda Magazine, where he said he had been diagnosed with incurable stage 4 lung cancer which had spread to his brain, and did not know how long he had to live.

== Shows ==
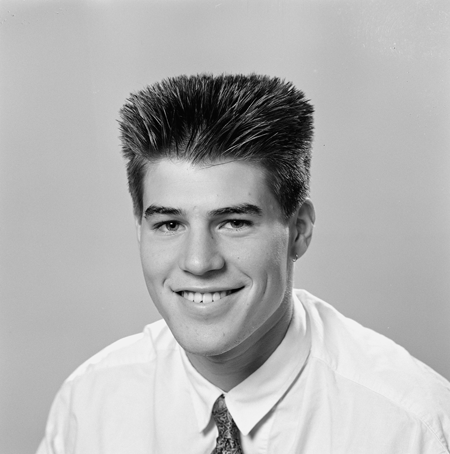
Martijn Krabbé in 1988

- Popformule (1987)
- Ministars (1991)
- Power Play (1992–1993)
- Postcode Loterij Recordshow (1995–1998)
- In Holland staat een Huis (1999–2006)
- In Holland ligt een Tuin (2001)
- Kiezen of Delen (2000–2001)
- Win een Sponsor (2000)
- Big Brother 4 (2002)
- De perfecte partner
- Idols (2005–2008)
- Dancing on Ice (2006–2007)
- Wie wordt de man van Froukje? (2007)
- Mijn Tent is Top finale (2008, 2009)
- Wie is de Chef? (2008–2009)
- Uitstel van Executie (2008–2011)
- Postcode Loterij Wat Schat Je? (2008)
- X Factor (2009–2013)
- Topchef (2009–2010)
- Topchef Vips (2009)
- De slimste (2009)
- The Voice of Holland (2010–2022, voice-over 2026)
- Hotel de Toekomst (2011)
- Krabbé staat op Straat (2011–2012)
- The Voice Kids (2012–2021)
- Blow Up (2022–2023)
