= The Masked Singer (Dutch TV series) =

Dutch singing competition television show

- Genre: Reality competition
- Based on: King of Mask Singer by Munhwa Broadcasting Corporation
- Presented by: Ruben Nicolai
- Starring: Buddy Vedder (s1-); Gerard Joling (s1-); Carlo Boszhard (s1-); Monica Geuze (s5-); Loretta Schrijver ^{†} (s1-6); Francis van Broekhuizen (New Year's Special 2021/2022)
- Country of origin: Netherlands
- Original language: Dutch
- No. of seasons: 7
- No. of episodes: 60 (+4 specials)

Production
- Running time: ± 70 minutes (S1) ± 90 minutes (S2)

Original release
- Network: RTL Nederland
- Release: 27 September 2019 – present

The Masked Singer is a Dutch reality singing competition television series based on the Masked Singer franchise which originated from the South Korean version of the show King of Mask Singer. It premiered on RTL Nederland on 27 September 2019, and is hosted by Ruben Nicolai.

== Series overview ==
Series overview
Series	Celebrities	Episodes	Originally released		Winner	Runner-up	Third place	Fourth place
Series	Celebrities	Episodes	First released	Last released	Winner	Runner-up	Third place	Fourth place
1	12	6	27 September 2019	1 November 2019	Tania Kross as "Robot"	Tim Douwsma as "Neushoorn"	Nienke Plas as "Bidsprinkhaan"	Guido Spek as "Leeuw"
2	15	8	25 September 2020	13 November 2020	Jan Dulles as "Neptunus "	Noortje Herlaar as "Vos"	Najib Amhali as "Zebra"	Nicolette van Dam as "Panter"
3	15	10	15 October 2021	17 December 2021	Jamai Loman as "Cupido"	Emma Heesters as "Krokodil"	Xander de Buisonjé as "Haai"	Tygo Gernandt as "Giraffe"
4	15	9	4 November 2022	30 December 2022	Jeroen van der Boom as "Tijger"	Henry van Loon as "Joker"	Lone van Roosendaal as "Pinguïn"	Monica Geuze as "Flamingo"
5	20	9	10 November 2023	31 December 2023	Simone Kleinsma as "Uil"	Kim-Lian van der Meij as "Nijlpaard"	Edson da Graça as "Ijsbeer"	Mart Hoogkamer as "Toffe Peer"
6	20	9	15 November 2024	4 January 2025	Soy Kroon as "Pegasus"	Bettina Holwerda as "Egel"	Alex Klaasen as "Baviaan"	Yuki Kempees as "Kangaroe"
7	20	9	14 November 2025	9 January 2026	April Darby as "Glamourpoes"	Yves Berendse as "Pauw"	Freek Bartels as "Cowboy"	Koen van Heest as "Beunhaas"

== Season 1 ==
=== Contestants ===
Stage name	Celebrity	Occupation	Episodes								
Stage name	Celebrity	Occupation	1	2	3	4	5				6
Stage name	Celebrity	Occupation	1	2	3	4	1	2	3	4	6
Robot	Tania Kross	Mezzo-soprano	SAFE		SAFE		WIN				WINNER
Rhino (Neushoorn)	Tim Douwsma	Singer		SAFE		SAFE			WIN		RUNNER-UP
Killer Mantis (Bidsprinkhaan)	Nienke Plas	Presenter	SAFE		SAFE			WIN			THIRD
Lion (Leeuw)	Guido Spek	Actor	SAFE		SAFE					WIN	FINALIST
Parrot (Papegaai)	Eddy Zoëy	Singer		SAFE		SAFE				OUT	
Unicorn (Eenhoorn)	Josje Huisman	Singer		SAFE		SAFE			OUT		
Monster	Rick Brandsteder	Presenter		SAFE		SAFE		OUT			
Sea Creature (Zeewezen)	Tineke Schouten	Comedian	SAFE		SAFE		OUT				
Dog (Hond)	Joke Bruijs	Actress		SAFE		OUT					
Rabbit (Konijn)	Gers Pardoel	Rapper	SAFE		OUT						
Archangel (Aartsengel)	Catherine Keyl	Presenter		OUT							
Springbok	Rintje Ritsma	Former speed skater	OUT								

The masked singer was safe from elimination.
The masked singer was eliminated from the competition and unmasked upon their elimination.
The masked singer did not perform.
The masked singer won their duet and was safe from elimination.
The masked singer won the competition.
The masked singer finished second.
The masked singer finished third.
The masked singer was a finalist.

==== Final Guesses ====
	Team Gerard & Buddy		Team Carlo & Lorreta		Intermediate score
	Buddy	Gerard	Carlo	Loretta	Intermediate score
Springbok	Erben Wennemars	Koen Verweij	Rintje Ritsma	Rintje Ritsma	0 - 2
Aartsengel	Erica Terpstra	Quinty Trustfull	Catherine Keyl	Catherine Keyl	0 - 4
Konijn	Gers Pardoel	Gers Pardoel	Gers Pardoel	Danny de Munk	2 - 5
Hond	Brigitte Kaandorp	Joke Bruijs	Patricia Paay	Patricia Paay	3 - 5
Zeewezen	Ilse DeLange	Ingrid Simons	Ruth Jacott	Cilly Darrell	3 - 5
Monster	Rick Brandseter	Rick Brandseter	Rick Brandseter	Rick Brandseter	5 - 8
Eenhoorn	Maan de Steenwinkel	Hind Laroussi	Josje Huisman	Do	3 - 6
Papegaai	Edwin Evers	Eddy Zoëy	Douwe Bob	Eddy Zoëy	6 - 9
Leeuw	Guido Spek	Ferry Doedens	Guido Spek	Ferry Doedens	7 - 10
Bidsprinkhaan	Nienke Plas	Nienke Plas	Elise Schaap	Birgit Schuurman	9 - 10
Neushoorn	Tim Douwsma	Tim Douwsma	Tim Douwsma	Tim Douwsma	11-12
Robot	Tania Kross	Tania Kross	Tania Kross	Tania Kross	13-14

=== Episodes ===
==== Episode 1 ====
Original airdate: 27 September 2019

#	Stage Name	Song	Identity	Occupation	Result
1	Lion	"Wrecking Ball" by Miley Cyrus	undisclosed		SAFE
2	Sea Creature	"Don't Call Me Up" by Mabel	undisclosed		SAFE
3	Springbok	"IJskoud" by Nielson	Rintje Ritsma	Former speed skater	OUT
4	Rabbit	"Shotgun" by George Ezra	undisclosed		SAFE
5	Robot	"Believer" by Imagine Dragons	undisclosed		SAFE
6	Killer Mantis	"Skyward" by Davina Michelle	undisclosed		SAFE

==== Episode 2 ====
Original airdate: 4 October 2019

#	Stage Name	Song	Identity	Occupation	Result
1	Rhino	"Titanium" by Sia & David Guetta	undisclosed		SAFE
2	Unicorn	"Say My Name" by David Guetta, Bebe Rexha & J Balvin	undisclosed		SAFE
3	Archangel	"Natural Woman" by Aretha Franklin	Catherine Keyl	Presenter	OUT
4	Parrot	"Before I Go" by Guy Sebastian	undisclosed		SAFE
5	Dog	"Bad Romance" by Lady Gaga	undisclosed		SAFE
6	Monster	"Jolene" by Dolly Parton	undisclosed		SAFE

==== Episode 3 ====
Original airdate: 11 October 2019

#	Stage Name	Song	Identity	Occupation	Result
1	Killer Mantis	"Walk Me Home" by Pink	undisclosed		SAFE
2	Lion	"Royals" by Lorde	undisclosed		SAFE
3	Sea Creature	"Girl" by Anouk	undisclosed		SAFE
4	Rabbit	"Can't Feel My Face" by The Weeknd	Gers Pardoel	Rapper	OUT
5	Robot	"Con Calma" by Daddy Yankee & Snow	undisclosed		SAFE

==== Episode 4 ====
Original airdate: 18 October 2019

#	Stage Name	Song	Identity	Occupation	Result
1	Monster	"She's Always a Woman" by Billy Joel	undisclosed		SAFE
2	Parrot	"Giant" by Calvin Harris & Rag'n'Bone Man	undisclosed		SAFE
3	Dog	"Rolling in the Deep" by Adele	Joke Bruijs	Actress	OUT
4	Unicorn	"Nothing Breaks Like a Heart" by Mark Ronson & Miley Cyrus	undisclosed		SAFE
5	Rhino	"Power Over Me" by Dermot Kennedy	undisclosed		SAFE

==== Episode 5 ====
Original airdate: 25 October 2019

#	Stage Name	Song	Identity	Occupation	Result
1	Robot	"Roar" by Katy Perry	undisclosed		WIN
1	Sea Creature	"Roar" by Katy Perry	Tineke Schouten	Comedian	OUT
2	Monster	"Shallow" by Lady Gaga & Bradley Cooper	Rick Brandsteder	Presenter	OUT
2	Killer Mantis	"Shallow" by Lady Gaga & Bradley Cooper	undisclosed		WIN
3	Unicorn	"Señorita" by Shawn Mendes & Camila Cabello	Josje Huisman	Singer	OUT
3	Rhino	"Señorita" by Shawn Mendes & Camila Cabello	undisclosed		WIN
4	Parrot	"One" by U2	Eddy Zoëy	Singer	OUT
4	Lion	"One" by U2	undisclosed		WIN

==== Episode 6 - Finale ====
Original airdate: 1 November 2019

#	Stage Name	Song	Identity	Occupation	Result
Round One
1	Killer Mantis	"Bang Bang" by Jessie J, Ariana Grande & Nicki Minaj	undisclosed		SAFE
2	Rhino	"Someone You Loved" by Lewis Capaldi	undisclosed		SAFE
3	Lion	"I Don't Want to Be" by Gavin DeGraw	Guido Spek	Actor	OUT
4	Robot	"Chandelier" by Sia	undisclosed		SAFE
Round Two
1	Killer Mantis	"Skyward" by Davina Michelle/ "Walk Me Home" by Pink	Nienke Plas	Presenter	THIRD
2	Rhino	"Titanium" by Sia & David Guetta/"Power Over Me" by Dermot Kennedy	undisclosed		SAFE
3	Robot	"Believer" by Imagine Dragons/"Con Calma" by Daddy Yankee & Snow	undisclosed		SAFE
Round Three
1	Robot	"Come Together" by The Beatles	Tania Kross	Mezzo-soprano	WINNER
1	Rhino	"Come Together" by The Beatles	Tim Douwsma	Singer	RUNNER-UP

== Season 2 ==
=== Contestants ===
Stage name	Celebrity	Occupation	Episodes									
Stage name	Celebrity	Occupation	1	2	3	4		5		6	7	8
Stage name	Celebrity	Occupation	1	2	3	A	B	C	D	6	7	8
Neptune (Neptunus)	Jan Dulles	Singer		SAFE		SAFE				WIN	WIN	WINNER
Fox (Vos)	Noortje Herlaar	Musical actress			SAFE			SAFE		RISK	WIN	RUNNER-UP
Zebra	Najib Amhali	Comedian			SAFE	SAFE				WIN	RISK	THIRD
Panther (Panter)	Nicolette van Dam	Presenter		SAFE					SAFE	WIN	WIN	FINALIST
Chameleon (Kameleon)	Samantha Steenwijk	Singer	SAFE				SAFE			WIN	OUT	
Butterfly (Vlinder)	Babette van Veen	Actress		SAFE				SAFE		RISK	OUT	
Llama (Lama)	Joris Linssen	Presenter	SAFE				SAFE			OUT		
Monkey (Aap)	Famke Louise	Singer			SAFE				SAFE	OUT		
Astronaut	Mattie Valk	Radio DJ			RISK				OUT			
Yeti	Ernst Daniël Smid	Opera singer		RISK				OUT				
King (Koning)	Diederik Jekel	Scientist	RISK				OUT					
Skeleton (Skelet)	Kim Feenstra	Model	SAFE			OUT						
Mouse (Muis)	Mariska Bauer	Presenter			OUT							
Dinosaur (Dinosaurus)	Churandy Martina	Sprinter		OUT								
Firebird (Vuurvogel)	Willeke Alberti	Singer	OUT									

The masked singer was safe from elimination.
The masked singer was in the bottom of the episode and performed in a sing-off, but was ultimately safe from elimination.
The masked singer was eliminated from the competition and unmasked upon their elimination.
The masked singer won their duet and was safe from elimination.
The masked singer did not perform.
The masked singer won the competition.
The masked singer finished second.
The masked singer finished third.
The masked singer finished fourth.

==== Final Guesses ====
	Team Gerard & Buddy		Team Carlo & Lorreta		Intermediate score
	Buddy	Gerard	Carlo	Loretta	Intermediate score
Vuurvogel	Janny van der Heijden	Willeke Alberti	Willeke Alberti	Imca Marina	1 - 1
Dinosaurus	Churandy Martina	Edgar Davids	Jörgen Raymann	London Loy	2 - 1
Muis	Gaby Blaaser	Patricia Paay	Heleen van Royen	Patricia Paay	2 - 1
Skelet	Holly Mae Brood	Kim Feenstra	Gaby Blaaser	Holly Mae Brood	3 - 1
Koning	Bram Krikke	Splinter Chabot	Mattie Valk	Armin van Buuren	3 - 1
Yeti	Ernst Daniël Smid	Ernst Daniël Smid	Ernst Daniël Smid	Ron Brandsteder	5 - 2
Astronaut	Mattie Valk	Mattie Valk	Mattie Valk	Mattie Valk	7 - 4
Aap	Famke Louise	Famke Louise	Famke Louise	Famke Louise	9 - 6
Lama	Tygo Gernandt	Rolf Sanchez	Rolf Sanchez	Alain Clark	9 - 6
Vlinder	Babette van Veen	Babette van Veen	Babette van Veen	Babette van Veen	11-8
Kameleon	Samantha Steenwijk	Samantha Steenwijk	Samantha Steenwijk	Samantha Steenwijk	13-10
Panter	Angela Schijf	Tooske Ragas	Nicolette van Dam	Nicolette Kluijver	13-11
Zebra	Guido Weijers	Najib Amhali	Najib Amhali	Najib Amhali	14-13
Vos	Noortje Herlaar	Noortje Herlaar	Noortje Herlaar	Nurlaila Karim	16-14
Neptunus	Jan Dulles	Jan Dulles	Jan Dulles	Jan Dulles	18-16

=== Episodes ===
==== Episode 1 ====
Original airdate: 25 September 2020

#	Stage Name	Song	Identity	Occupation	Result
1	Chameleon	"Higher Love" by Kygo feat. Whitney Houston	undisclosed		SAFE
2	King	"Uncharted" by Kensington	undisclosed		RISK
3	Firebird	"Poker Face" by Lady Gaga	undisclosed		RISK
4	Skeleton	"Say My Name" by Destiny's Child	undisclosed		SAFE
5	Llama	"The Lazy Song" by Bruno Mars	undisclosed		SAFE
6	Chameleon, King, Firebird, Skeleton, Llama	"Don't Stop Me Now" by Queen			
Sing-Off
1	Firebird	"Private Dancer" by Tina Turner	Willeke Alberti	Singer	OUT
2	King	"Shut up and Dance" by Walk the Moon	undisclosed		SAFE

==== Episode 2 ====
Original airdate: 2 October 2020

#	Stage Name	Song	Identity	Occupation	Result
1	Butterfly	"Chained to the Rhythm" by Katy Perry ft. Skip Marley	undisclosed		SAFE
2	Dinosaur	"The Man" by Aloe Blacc	undisclosed		RISK
3	Panther	"Maneater" by Nelly Furtado	undisclosed		SAFE
4	Yeti	"Skin" by Rag'n'Bone Man	undisclosed		RISK
5	Neptune	"What a Man Gotta Do" by Jonas Brothers	undisclosed		SAFE
6	Butterfly, Dinosaur, Panther, Yeti, Neptune	"Start Me Up" by The Rolling Stones			
Sing-Off
1	Dinosaur	"Despacito" by Luis Fonsi & Daddy Yankee	Churandy Martina	Sprinter	OUT
2	Yeti	"Knockin' on Heaven's Door" by Guns N' Roses	undisclosed		SAFE

==== Episode 3 ====
Original airdate: 9 October 2020

#	Stage Name	Song	Identity	Occupation	Result
1	Monkey	"Dance Monkey" by Tones and I	undisclosed		SAFE
2	Zebra	"Black or White" by Michael Jackson	undisclosed		SAFE
3	Mouse	"Friends" by Marshmello and Anne-Marie	undisclosed		RISK
4	Astronaut	"Something Just Like This" by The Chainsmokers feat. Coldplay	undisclosed		RISK
5	Fox	"Beat Me" by Davina Michelle	undisclosed		SAFE
6	Monkey, Zebra, Mouse, Astronaut, Fox	"Born This Way" by Lady Gaga			
Sing-Off
1	Mouse	"Shake It Off" by Taylor Swift	Mariska Bauer	Presenter	OUT
2	Astronaut	"Demons" by Imagine Dragons	undisclosed		SAFE

==== Episode 4 ====
Original airdate: 16 October 2020

#	Stage Name	Song	Identity	Occupation	Result
1	Skeleton	"Like A Prayer" by Madonna	Kim Feenstra	Model	OUT
2	Neptune	"Counting Stars" by OneRepublic	undisclosed		SAFE
3	Zebra	"Sex Bomb" by Tom Jones	undisclosed		SAFE
4	King	"Candy" by Robbie Williams	Diederik Jekel	Scientist	OUT
5	Llama	"Ego" by Willy William	undisclosed		SAFE
6	Chameleon	"Starships" by Nicki Minaj	undisclosed		SAFE

==== Episode 5 ====
Original airdate: 23 October 2020

#	Stage name	Song	Identity	Occupation	Result
1	Fox	"Crazy In Love" by Beyoncé feat. Jay-Z	undisclosed		SAFE
2	Yeti	"Feeling Good" by Michael Bublé	Ernst Daniël Smid	Opera singer	OUT
3	Butterfly	"Ritual" by Tiësto, Jonas Blue and Rita Ora	undisclosed		SAFE
4	Panther	"7 Rings" by Ariana Grande	undisclosed		SAFE
5	Astronaut	"Drown" by Martin Garrix	Mattie Valk	Radio DJ	OUT
6	Monkey	"Blinding Lights" by The Weeknd	undisclosed		SAFE

==== Episode 6 ====
Original airdate: 30 October 2020

#	Stage Name	Song	Identity	Occupation	Result
Round One
1	Zebra	"Dancing In The Street" by Marvin Gaye	undisclosed		WIN
1	Monkey	"Dancing In The Street" by Marvin Gaye	undisclosed		RISK
2	Butterfly	"Kids" by Robbie Williams and Kylie Minogue	undisclosed		RISK
2	Neptune	"Kids" by Robbie Williams and Kylie Minogue	undisclosed		WIN
Sing-Off
1
1	Monkey	"Some Nights" by fun.	Famke Louise	Singer	OUT
1	Butterfly	"Some Nights" by fun.	undisclosed		SAFE
Round Two
1	Llama	"Échame la Culpa" by Luis Fonsi and Demi Lovato	undisclosed		RISK
1	Panther	"Échame la Culpa" by Luis Fonsi and Demi Lovato	undisclosed		WIN
2	Chameleon	"Try" by Pink	undisclosed		WIN
2	Fox	"Try" by Pink	undisclosed		RISK
Sing-Off
1
1	Llama	"I Want It All" by Queen	Joris Linssen	Presenter	OUT
1	Fox	"I Want It All" by Queen	undisclosed		SAFE

==== Episode 7 ====
Original airdate: 6 November 2020

#	Stage Name	Song	Identity	Occupation	Result
1	Panther	"Unstoppable" by Sia	undisclosed		WIN
2	Butterfly	"I Knew You Were Trouble" by Taylor Swift	undisclosed		RISK
3	Chameleon	"Şımarık" by Tarkan	undisclosed		RISK
4	Neptune	"Lose Somebody" by Kygo and OneRepublic	undisclosed		WIN
5	Zebra	"When the Going Gets Tough" by Billy Ocean	undisclosed		RISK
6	Fox	"Always Remember Us This Way" by Lady Gaga	undisclosed		WIN
Sing-Off
1
1	Butterfly	"High Hopes" by Panic! at the Disco	Babette van Veen	Actress	OUT
1	Chameleon	"High Hopes" by Panic! at the Disco	Samantha Steenwijk	Singer	OUT
1	Zebra	"High Hopes" by Panic! at the Disco	undisclosed		SAFE

==== Episode 8 - Finale ====
Original airdate: 13 November 2020

#	Stage Name	Song	Identity	Occupation	Result
1	Fox, Zebra, Panther, Neptune	"Youngblood" by 5 Seconds of Summer			
Round One
2	Fox	"Human" by Rag'n'Bone Man	undisclosed		SAFE
3	Zebra	"I Want To Break Free" by Queen	undisclosed		SAFE
4	Panther	"Sweet But Psycho" by Ava Max	Nicolette van Dam	Presenter	OUT
5	Neptune	"Sign of the Times" by Harry Styles	undisclosed		SAFE
Round Two
1	Fox	"This Is Me" from The Greatest Showman	undisclosed		SAFE
2	Zebra	"C'est la vie" by Khaled	Najib Amhali	Comedian	THIRD
3	Neptune	"Pride" by U2	undisclosed		SAFE
Round Three
1	Neptune	"River Deep, Mountain High" by Tina Turner	Jan Dulles	Singer	WINNER
1	Fox	"River Deep, Mountain High" by Tina Turner	Noortje Herlaar	Musical actress	RUNNER-UP

== Season 3 ==
=== Contestants ===
Stage name	Celebrity	Occupation	Episodes									
Stage name	Celebrity	Occupation	1	2	3	4	5	6	7	8	9	10
Cupid (Cupido)	Jamai Loman	Singer	SAFE				SAFE		SAFE	WIN	WIN	WINNER
Crocodile (Krokodil)	Emma Heesters	Singer	SAFE			SAFE		SAFE		WIN	WIN	RUNNER-UP
Shark (Haai)	Xander de Buisonjé	Singer			SAFE		SAFE	SAFE		RISK	WIN	THIRD
Giraffe	Tygo Gernandt	Actor		SAFE		SAFE			SAFE	RISK	RISK	FINALIST
Bull (Stier)	Edwin Evers	Drummer		SAFE		SAFE			SAFE	WIN	OUT	
Piglet (Biggetje)	Nicolette Kluijver	Presenter			SAFE		SAFE		SAFE	WIN	OUT	
Pharaoh (Farao)	René van Kooten	Musical actor			SAFE		SAFE	SAFE		OUT		
Scarecrow (Vogelverschrikker)	Marc-Marie Huijbregts	Comedian	SAFE			SAFE		SAFE		OUT		
Bookworm (Boekenwurm)	Daphne Deckers	Model		RISK			SAFE		OUT			
Ladybug (Lieveheersbeestje)	Karin Bloemen	Singer		SAFE		SAFE		OUT				
Elf (Elfje)	Isa Hoes	Actress			RISK		OUT					
Alien (Buitenaards Wezen)	Luuk Ikink	Presenter	RISK			OUT						
Octopus	Jette van der Meij	Actress			OUT							
Viking	Ron Brandsteder	Presenter		OUT								
Swan (Zwaan)	Anita Witzier	Presenter	OUT									

The masked singer was safe from elimination.
The masked singer was in the bottom of the episode and performed in a sing-off, but was ultimately safe from elimination.
The masked singer was eliminated from the competition and unmasked upon their elimination.
The masked singer won their duet and was safe from elimination.
The masked singer did not perform.
The masked singer won the competition.
The masked singer finished second.
The masked singer finished third.
The masked singer finished fourth.

==== Final Guesses ====
	Team Gerard		Team Carlo		Intermediate score
	Buddy	Gerard	Carlo	Loretta	Intermediate score
Zwaan	Patty Brard	Marga Bult	Katja Schuurman	Quinty Trustfull	0 - 0
Viking	Lee Towers	Ron Brandsteder	Ron Brandsteder	Ron Brandsteder	1 - 2
Octopus	Martine van Os	Martine van Os	Jette van der Meij	Gerrie van der Klei	1 - 3
Buitenaards Wezen	Frank Dane	Gerard Ekdom	Luuk Ikink	Luuk Ikink	1 - 5
Elfje	Froukje de Both	Nicolette Kluijver	Natasja Froger	Igone de Jongh	1 - 5
Lieveheersbeestje	Karin Bloemen	Karin Bloemen	Karin Bloemen	Karin Bloemen	5 (Note: Team Gerard received two bonuspoints for guessing the guest performers.) - 7
Boekenwurm	Saskia Noort	Monica Geuze	Anna Nooshin	Heleen van Rooijen	6 (Note: Team Gerard received one bonuspoint for guessing the guest performer.) - 7
Vogelverschrikker	Alex Klaassen	Freek Bartels	Marc-Marie Huijbregts	Marc-Marie Huijbregts	6 - 9
Farao	René van Kooten	René van Kooten	René van Kooten	René van Kooten	8 - 11
Biggetje	Nicolette Kluijver	Nicolette Kluijver	Nicolette Kluijver	Nicolette Kluijver	10 - 13
Stier	Edwin Evers	Edwin Evers	Snelle	Douwe Bob	12 - 13
Giraffe	Ruben van der Meer	Ruben van der Meer	Steven Brunswijk	Ruben van der Meer	12 - 13
Haai	Xander de Buisonjé	Xander de Buisonjé	Xander de Buisonjé	Xander de Buisonjé	14 - 15
Krokodil	Emma Heesters	Emma Heesters	Emma Heesters	Emma Heesters	16 - 17
Cupido	Jamai Loman	Charly Luske	Jamai Loman	Charly Luske	17 - 18

=== Episodes ===
==== Episode 1 ====
Original airdate: 15 October 2021

#	Stage Name	Song	Identity	Occupation	Result
1	Crocodile	"Nutbush City Limits" by Tina Turner	undisclosed		SAFE
2	Scarecrow	"Diamonds" by Sam Smith	undisclosed		SAFE
3	Swan	"Physical" by Dua Lipa	undisclosed		RISK
4	Alien	"Accidentally in Love" by Counting Crows	undisclosed		RISK
5	Cupid	"Chew on My Heart" by James Bay	undisclosed		SAFE
6	Crocodile, Scarecrow, Swan, Alien, Cupid	"Learning to Fly" by Sheppard			
Sing-Off
1	Swan	"Call Me" by Blondie	Anita Witzier	Presenter	OUT
2	Alien	"Dancing in the Moonlight" by Toploader	undisclosed		SAFE

==== Episode 2 ====
Original airdate: 22 October 2021

#	Stage Name	Song	Identity	Occupation	Result
1	Giraffe	"Voulez-Vous" by ABBA	undisclosed		SAFE
2	Bookworm	"Levitating" by Dua Lipa feat. DaBaby	undisclosed		RISK
3	Bull	"Little Bit of Love" by Tom Grennan	undisclosed		SAFE
4	Viking	"Wellerman" by Nathan Evans	undisclosed		RISK
5	Ladybug	"Hold My Hand" by Jess Glynne	undisclosed		SAFE
6	Giraffe, Bookworm, Bull, Viking, Ladybug	"Are You Gonna Go My Way" by Lenny Kravitz			
Sing-Off
1	Bookworm	"Hot Stuff" by Donna Summer	undisclosed		SAFE
2	Viking	"Can't Help Falling in Love" by Elvis Presley	Ron Brandsteder	Presenter	OUT

==== Episode 3 ====
Original airdate: 29 October 2021

#	Stage Name	Song	Identity	Occupation	Result
1	Piglet	"Dear Future Husband" by Meghan Trainor	undisclosed		SAFE
2	Shark	"Don't Leave Me This Way" by Harold Melvin & the Blue Notes	undisclosed		SAFE
3	Elf	"Dusk Till Dawn" by Zayn feat. Sia	undisclosed		RISK
4	Octopus	"Fever" by Peggy Lee	undisclosed		RISK
5	Pharaoh	"Gold" by Spandau Ballet	undisclosed		SAFE
6	Piglet, Shark, Elf, Octopus, Pharaoh	"Freedom! '90" by George Michael			
Sing-Off
1	Octopus	"Gracias a la Vida" by Violeta Parra	Jette van der Meij	Actress	OUT
2	Elf	"Salt" by Ava Max	undisclosed		SAFE

==== Episode 4 ====
Original airdate: 5 November 2021

- Guest Performance: "Kiss" by Prince performed by Gert Verhulst & Viktor Verhulst as "Parrots"

#	Stage Name	Song	Identity	Occupation	Result
1	Bull	"Faith" by George Michael	undisclosed		SAFE
2	Giraffe	"Head & Heart" by Joel Corry & MNEK	undisclosed		SAFE
3	Ladybug	"Good as Hell" by Lizzo	undisclosed		SAFE
4	Scarecrow	"I'm Still Standing" by Elton John	undisclosed		SAFE
5	Alien	"Afraid of the Dark" by Chef'Special	Luuk Ikink	Presenter	OUT
6	Crocodile	"How Will I Know" by Whitney Houston	undisclosed		SAFE

==== Episode 5 ====
Original airdate: 12 November 2021

- Guest Performance: "Mamma Mia" by ABBA performed by Jamie Westland & Frans van Zoest as "Monsters"

#	Stage Name	Song	Identity	Occupation	Result
1	Pharaoh	"Dynamite" by BTS	undisclosed		SAFE
2	Elf	"Hero" by Afrojack & David Guetta	Isa Hoes	Actress	OUT
3	Shark	"Cake by the Ocean" by DNCE	undisclosed		SAFE
4	Bookworm	"Superstar" by Jamelia	undisclosed		SAFE
5	Cupid	"The Power of Love" by Huey Lewis and the News	undisclosed		SAFE
6	Piglet	"Hollaback Girl" by Gwen Stefani	undisclosed		SAFE

==== Episode 6 ====
Original airdate: 19 November 2021

- Guest Performance: "(I've Had) The Time of My Life" by Bill Medley & Jennifer Warnes performed by Manon Meijers & Guus Meeuwis as "Ice Cream & Cupcake"

#	Stage Name	Song	Identity	Occupation	Result
1	Ladybug	"Lady Marmalade" by Labelle	Karin Bloemen	Singer	OUT
2	Scarecrow	"When We Were Young" by Adele	undisclosed		SAFE
3	Crocodile	"Don't Go Yet" by Camila Cabello	undisclosed		SAFE
4	Pharaoh	"Love Runs Out" by OneRepublic	undisclosed		SAFE
5	Shark	"A Little Less Conversation" by Elvis Presley	undisclosed		SAFE

==== Episode 7 ====
Original airdate: 25 November 2021

- Guest Performance: "Kings & Queens" by Ava Max performed by Geraldine Kemper as "Pug"

	Stage Name	Song	Identity	Occupation	Result
1	Cupid	"Locked Out of Heaven" by Bruno Mars	undisclosed		SAFE
2	Bookworm	"Murder on the Dancefloor" by Sophie Ellis-Bextor	Daphne Deckers	Model	OUT
3	Bull	"It's Not Unusual" by Tom Jones	undisclosed		SAFE
4	Piglet	"Bootylicious" by Destiny's Child	undisclosed		SAFE
5	Giraffe	"Sweet Child o' Mine" by Guns N' Roses	undisclosed		SAFE

==== Episode 8 ====
Original airdate: 3 December 2021

#	Stage Name	Song	Identity	Occupation	Result
Round One
1	Bull	"Under Pressure" by Queen and David Bowie	undisclosed		WIN
1	Scarecrow	"Under Pressure" by Queen and David Bowie	undisclosed		RISK
2	Crocodile	"Angels like You" by Miley Cyrus	undisclosed		WIN
2	Shark	"Angels like You" by Miley Cyrus	undisclosed		RISK
Sing-Off
3	Shark	"One Way or Another" by Blondie	undisclosed		SAFE
3	Scarecrow	"One Way or Another" by Blondie	Marc-Marie Huijbregts	Comedian	OUT
Round Two
1	Piglet	"Iko Iko" by Justin Wellington feat. Small Jam	undisclosed		WIN
1	Giraffe	"Iko Iko" by Justin Wellington feat. Small Jam	undisclosed		RISK
2	Cupid	"Don't Let the Sun Go Down on Me" by Elton John	undisclosed		WIN
2	Pharaoh	"Don't Let the Sun Go Down on Me" by Elton John	undisclosed		RISK
Sing-Off
3	Giraffe	"Beggin'" by Måneskin	undisclosed		SAFE
3	Pharaoh	"Beggin'" by Måneskin	René van Kooten	Musical actor	OUT

==== Episode 9 ====
Original airdate: 10 December 2021

#	Stage Name	Song	Identity	Occupation	Result
1	Crocodile	"End of Time" by Beyoncé	undisclosed		WIN
2	Giraffe	"Tous les mêmes" by Stromae	undisclosed		RISK
3	Shark	"Nice to Meet Ya" by Niall Horan	undisclosed		WIN
4	Piglet	"Vogue" by Madonna	undisclosed		RISK
5	Cupid	"The Edge of Glory" by Lady Gaga	undisclosed		WIN
6	Bull	"Before You Go" by Lewis Capaldi	undisclosed		RISK
Sing-Off
1	Piglet	"Someone to You" by Banners	Nicolette Kluijver	Presenter	OUT
1	Bull	"Someone to You" by Banners	Edwin Evers	Drummer	OUT
1	Giraffe	"Someone to You" by Banners	undisclosed		SAFE

==== Episode 10 - Finale ====
Original airdate: 17 December 2021

	Stage Name	Song	Identity	Occupation	Result
1	Giraffe, Cupid, Shark, Crocodile	"Let's Get It Started" by Black Eyed Peas			
Round One
2	Giraffe	"Love Me Again" by John Newman	Tygo Gernandt	Actor	OUT
3	Cupid	"Too Much Love Will Kill You" by Brian May	undisclosed		SAFE
4	Shark	"Zitti e buoni" by Måneskin	undisclosed		SAFE
5	Crocodile	"It's All Coming Back to Me Now" by Celine Dion	undisclosed		SAFE
Round Two
1	Crocodile	"Ain't It Funny" by Jennifer Lopez	undisclosed		SAFE
2	Shark	"Bye Bye Bye" by NSYNC	Xander de Buisonjé	Singer	THIRD
3	Cupid	"You're the Voice" by John Farnham	undisclosed		SAFE
Round Three
1	Crocodile	"Dream On" by Aerosmith	Emma Heesters	Singer	RUNNER-UP
1	Cupid	"Dream On" by Aerosmith	Jamai Loman	Singer	WINNER

== Season 4 ==
=== Contestants ===
Stage name	Celebrity	Occupation	Episodes											
Stage name	Celebrity	Occupation	1	2	3	4	5	6	7	8				9
Stage name	Celebrity	Occupation	1	2	3	4	5	6	7	1	2	3	4	9
Tiger (Tijger)	Jeroen van der Boom	Singer		SAFE		SAFE		SAFE		WIN				WINNER
Joker	Henry van Loon	Actor	SAFE			SAFE		SAFE				WIN		RUNNER-UP
Penguin (Pinguïn)	Lone van Roosendaal	Musical actress	SAFE			SAFE			SAFE				WIN	THIRD
Flamingo	Monica Geuze	Influencer	SAFE			SAFE		SAFE			WIN			FINALIST
Panda	Birgit Schuurman	Singer		SAFE			SAFE		SAFE				OUT	
Queen Bee (Bijenkoningin)	Berget Lewis	Singer			SAFE		SAFE	SAFE				OUT		
Elephant (Olifant)	Everon Jackson Hooi	Actor	RISK				SAFE		SAFE		OUT			
Frog (Kikker)	Wolter Kroes	Singer			SAFE		SAFE		SAFE	OUT				
Knight (Ridder)	Gerard Ekdom	Radio DJ			RISK		SAFE		OUT					
Mermaid (Zeemeermin)	Loiza Lamers	Model		RISK		SAFE		OUT						
Horse (Paard)	Bridget Maasland	Presenter			SAFE		OUT							
Crab (Krab)	Ronnie Flex	Rapper		SAFE		OUT								
Teddy Bear (Teddybeer)	Robèrt van Beckhoven	Pastry chef			OUT									
Mummy (Mummie)	Toine van Peperstraten	Sports journalist		OUT										
Witch (Heks)	Miljuschka Witzenhausen	Model	OUT											

The masked singer was safe from elimination.
The masked singer won their duet and was safe from elimination.
The masked singer was in the bottom of the episode and performed in a sing-off, but was ultimately safe from elimination.
The masked singer was eliminated from the competition and unmasked upon their elimination.
The masked singer did not perform.
The masked singer won the competition.
The masked singer finished second.
The masked singer finished third.
The masked singer finished fourth.

==== Final Guesses ====
	Team Gerard		Team Carlo		Intermediate score
	Buddy	Gerard	Carlo	Loretta	Intermediate score
Heks	Angela Schijf	Georgina Verbaan	Tanja Jess	Georgina Verbaan	0 - 0
Mummie	Toine van Peperstraten	Rob Kamphues	Hugo Kennis	Dennis Weening	1 - 0
Teddybeer	André Rieu	Jan Slagter	Albert Verlinde	Roy Donders	1 - 0
Krab	Ronnie Flex	Ronnie Flex	Donnie	Ronnie Flex	3 - 2 (Note: Team Carlo received one bonuspoint for guessing one of the guest performers.)
Paard	Patty Brard	Kim-Lian van der Meij	Nada van Nie	Olcay Gulsen	3 - 4 (Note: Team Carlo received two bonuspoints for guessing both the guest performers.)
Zeemeermin	Loiza Lamers	Loiza Lamers	Loiza Lamers	Loiza Lamers	6 - 7 (Note: Both teams received one bonuspoint for guessing the guest performer.)
Ridder	Gerard Ekdom	Gerard Ekdom	Gerard Ekdom	Gerard Ekdom	8 - 11 (Note: Team Carlo received two bonuspoints for guessing both the guest performers.)
Kikker	Wolter Kroes	Wolter Kroes	Wolter Kroes	Wolter Kroes	10-13
Olifant	Juvat Westendorp	Everon Jackson Hooi	Jan Versteegh	Martijn Krabbé	11-13
Bijenkoningin	Berget Lewis	Berget Lewis	Berget Lewis	Berget Lewis	13-15
Panda	Angela Schijf	Angela Schijf	Vajèn van den Bosch	Birgit Schuurman	13-16
Flamingo	Anna Nooshin	Froukje de Both	Kim Kötter	Kim Kötter	13-16
Pinguïn	Lone van Roosendaal	Lone van Roosendaal	Vajèn van den Bosch	Vajèn van den Bosch	15-16
Joker	Jim Bakkum	Jaap Reesema	Thomas Berge	Jaap Reesema	15-16
Tijger	Chris Zegers	Chris Zegers	Jeroen van der Boom	Jeroen van Koningsbrugge	15-17

=== Episodes ===
==== Episode 1 ====
Original airdate: 4 November 2022

Performances on the first episode
#	Stage Name	Song	Identity	Occupation	Result
1	Joker	"As It Was" by Harry Styles	undisclosed		SAFE
2	Witch	"Don't Cha" by The Pussycat Dolls ft. Busta Rhymes	undisclosed		RISK
3	Elephant	"Larger than Life" by Backstreet Boys	undisclosed		RISK
4	Penguin	"If I Could Turn Back Time" by Cher	undisclosed		SAFE
5	Flamingo	"When You Look at Me" by Christina Milian	undisclosed		SAFE
6	Joker, Witch, Elephant, Penguin, Flamingo	"Just Like Fire" by P!nk			
Sing-Off
1	Witch	"Just a Girl" by No Doubt	Miljuschka Witzenhausen	Model	OUT
2	Elephant	"Watermelon Sugar" by Harry Styles	undisclosed		SAFE

==== Episode 2 ====
Original airdate: 11 November 2022

Performances on the first episode
#	Stage Name	Song	Identity	Occupation	Result
1	Tiger	"Eye of the Tiger" by Survivor	undisclosed		SAFE
2	Mermaid	"Yes Sir, I Can Boogie" by Baccara	undisclosed		RISK
3	Crab	"Telephone" by Lady Gaga ft. Beyoncé	undisclosed		SAFE
4	Mummy	"Losing My Religion" by R.E.M.	undisclosed		RISK
5	Panda	"Fingers Crossed" by Lauren Spencer-Smith	undisclosed		SAFE
6	Tiger, Mermaid, Crab, Mummy, Panda	"We Built This City" by Starship			
Sing-Off
1	Mummy	"Rock DJ" by Robbie Williams	Toine van Peperstraten	Sports journalist	OUT
2	Mermaid	"I Love It" by Icona Pop ft. Charli XCX	undisclosed		SAFE

==== Episode 3 ====
Original airdate: 18 November 2022

#	Stage Name	Song	Identity	Occupation	Result
1	Frog	"Green Green Grass" by George Ezra	undisclosed		SAFE
2	Horse	"I Think We're Alone Now" by Tiffany	undisclosed		SAFE
3	Knight	"Castle on the Hill" by Ed Sheeran	undisclosed		RISK
4	Teddy Bear	"Everlasting Love" by Robert Knight	undisclosed		RISK
5	Queen Bee	"Supermodel" by Måneskin	undisclosed		SAFE
6	Frog, Horse, Knight, Teddy Bear, Queen Bee	"Livin' la Vida Loca" by Ricky Martin			
Sing-Off
1	Knight	"Dance with Somebody" by Mando Diao	undisclosed		SAFE
2	Teddy Bear	"What a Wonderful World" by Louis Armstrong	Robèrt van Beckhoven	Pastry chef	OUT

==== Episode 4 ====
Original airdate: 25 November 2022

- Guest Performance: "All My Life" by K-Ci & Jojo performed by Ronald de Boer & Demi de Boer as "Dragons"

#	Stage Name	Song	Identity	Occupation	Result
1	Penguin	"Atemlos durch die Nacht" by Helene Fischer	undisclosed		SAFE
2	Crab	"Beat It" by Michael Jackson	Ronnie Flex	Rapper	OUT
3	Tiger	"Sing" by Ed Sheeran	undisclosed		SAFE
4	Flamingo	"Bam Bam" by Camila Cabello	undisclosed		SAFE
5	Mermaid	"Who Do You Think You Are" by Spice Girls	undisclosed		SAFE
6	Joker	"Dancing Feet" by Kygo & DNCE	undisclosed		SAFE

==== Episode 5 ====
Original airdate: 2 December 2022

- Guest Performance: "Sunshine" by OneRepublic performed by Winston Gerschtanowitz & Renate Verbaan as "Robots"

#	Stage Name	Song	Identity	Occupation	Result
1	Queen Bee	"Naughty Girl" by Beyoncé	undisclosed		SAFE
2	Knight	"Multicolor" by Son Mieux	undisclosed		SAFE
3	Panda	"Rumor Has It" by Adele	undisclosed		SAFE
4	Elephant	"Thats What I Want" by Lil Nas X	undisclosed		SAFE
5	Horse	"Oops!... I Did It Again" by Britney Spears	Bridget Maasland	Presenter	OUT
6	Frog	"Got My Mind Set on You" by George Harrison	undisclosed		SAFE

==== Episode 6 ====
Original airdate: 9 December 2022

- Guest Performance: "Physical" by Olivia Newton-John performed by Patty Brard as "Cake"

#	Stage Name	Song	Identity	Occupation	Result
1	Mermaid	"Get the Party Started" by P!nk	Loiza Lamers	Model	OUT
2	Joker	"Soldier On" by Di-rect	undisclosed		SAFE
3	Queen Bee	"Holding Out for a Hero" by Bonnie Tyler	undisclosed		SAFE
4	Flamingo	"Shut Up and Drive" by Rihanna	undisclosed		SAFE
5	Tiger	"You Can Leave Your Hat On" by Joe Cocker	undisclosed		SAFE

==== Episode 7 ====
Original airdate: 16 December 2022

- Guest Performance: "When You're Gone" by Bryan Adams performed by Olcay Gulsen & Ruud de Wild as "Star & Saturn"

#	Stage Name	Song	Identity	Occupation	Result
1	Panda	"Don't Speak" by No Doubt	undisclosed		SAFE
2	Knight	"Whatever It Takes" by Imagine Dragons	Gerard Ekdom	Radio DJ	OUT
3	Frog	"The Edge of Heaven" by Wham!	undisclosed		SAFE
4	Penguin	"Tell It to My Heart" by Taylor Dayne	undisclosed		SAFE
5	Elephant	"When You're Gone" by Shawn Mendes	undisclosed		SAFE

==== Episode 8 ====
Original airdate: 23 December 2022

#	Stage Name	Song	Identity	Occupation	Result
1	Tiger	"Merry Christmas Everybody" by Slade	undisclosed		WIN
1	Frog	"Merry Christmas Everybody" by Slade	Wolter Kroes	Singer	OUT
2	Elephant	"Underneath The Tree" by Kelly Clarkson	Everon Jackson Hooi	Actor	OUT
2	Flamingo	"Underneath The Tree" by Kelly Clarkson	undisclosed		WIN
3	Joker	"Last Christmas" by Wham!	undisclosed		WIN
3	Queen Bee	"Last Christmas" by Wham!	Berget Lewis	Singer	OUT
4	Penguin	"Santa Claus Is Comin' to Town" by Mariah Carey	undisclosed		WIN
4	Panda	"Santa Claus Is Comin' to Town" by Mariah Carey	Birgit Schuurman	Singer	OUT

==== Episode 9 - Finale ====
Original airdate: 30 December 2022

#	Stage Name	Song	Identity	Occupation	Result
1	Tiger, Flamingo, Joker, Penguin	"Hey Look Ma, I Made It" by Panic! at the Disco			
Round One
2	Tiger and Edsilia Rombley	"The Show Must Go On" by Queen	undisclosed		SAFE
3	Flamingo and Jamai Loman	"Treasure" by Bruno Mars	Monica Geuze	Influencer	OUT
4	Penguin and Nick Schilder	"You Are the Reason" by Calum Scott	undisclosed		SAFE
5	Joker and Jan Dulles	"Higher Ground" by Stevie Wonder	undisclosed		SAFE
Round Two
1	Penguin	"Alone" by Heart	Lone van Roosendaal	Musical Actress	THIRD
2	Tiger	"This is My Life" by Shirley Bassey	undisclosed		SAFE
3	Joker	"Arcade" by Duncan Laurence	undisclosed		SAFE
Round Three
1	Joker	"Through the Looking Glass" by Di-Rect	Henry van Loon	Actor	RUNNER-UP
1	Tiger	"Through the Looking Glass" by Di-Rect	Jeroen van der Boom	Singer	WINNER

== Season 5 ==
=== Contestants ===
Stage name	Celebrity	Occupation	Episodes								
Stage name	Celebrity	Occupation	1	2	3	4	5	6	7	8	9
Owl (Uil)	Simone Kleinsma	Musical actress			SAFE			SAFE	WIN	SAFE	WINNER
Hippo (Nijlpaard)	Kim-Lian van der Meij	Musical actress	SAFE				SAFE		WIN	SAFE	RUNNER-UP
Polar Bear (Ijsbeer)	Edson da Graça	Comedian			SAFE			SAFE	WIN	SAFE	THIRD
Toffe Pear (Toffe Peer)	Mart Hoogkamer	Singer		SAFE			SAFE		RISK	SAFE	FINALIST
Koala	Walid Benmbarek	Actor		SAFE			SAFE		WIN	OUT	
Magician (Magier)	Douwe Bob	Singer				SAFE		SAFE	RISK	OUT	
Squirrel (Eekhoorn)	Marieke Elsinga	Radio DJ		SAFE				SAFE	OUT		
Skunk (Stinkdier)	Guido Weijers	Comedian	SAFE				SAFE		OUT		
Buffalo (Buffel)	Ron Boszhard	Presenter				SAFE		OUT			
Deer (Hert)	Natacha Harlequin	Lawyer				SAFE		OUT			
Walrus	Jan Joost van Gangelen	Presenter	SAFE				OUT				
Rubber Duck (Badeend)	Tina de Bruin	Actress			SAFE		OUT				
Sheep (Schaap)	Anniko van Santen	Presenter				OUT					
Starfish (Zeester)	Britt Dekker	Presenter				OUT					
Garden Gnome (Tuinkabouter)	William Rutten	Photographer			OUT						
Disco Ball (Discobol)	Hans van Breukelen	Former Footballer			OUT						
Pufferfish (Kogelvis)	Albert Verlinde	Producer		OUT							
Bonbon	Anky van Grunsven	Olympic Equestrian		OUT							
Dragonfly (Libelle)	Dionne Stax	Journalist	OUT								
Grapes (Druiventros)	Bert van Leeuwen	TV Presenter	OUT								

The masked singer was safe from elimination.
The masked singer won their duet and was safe from elimination.
The masked singer was in the bottom of the episode and performed in a sing-off, but was ultimately safe from elimination.
The masked singer was eliminated from the competition and unmasked upon their elimination.
The masked singer did not perform.
The masked singer won the competition.
The masked singer finished second.
The masked singer finished third.
The masked singer finished fourth.

==== Final Guesses ====
	Buddy	Gerard	Carlo	Loretta	Monica
Druiventros	Bert van Leeuwen	Dries Roelvink	Robbert Rodenburg	Jochem van Gelder	Martien Meiland
Libelle	Leonie ter Braak	Jaimie Vaes	Leonie ter Braak	Jaimie Vaes	Jaimie Vaes
Bonbon	Evi Hanssen	Holly Mae Brood	Yvon Jaspers	Connie Breukhoven	Marijke Helwegen
Kogelvis	Cornald Maas	Henk Poort	Cornald Maas	Cornald Maas	Beau van Erven Dorens
Discobol	Glenn Helder	Thomas Berge	Dennis van der Geest	Henny Huisman	Andy van der Meijde
Tuinkabouter	Glen Faria	Thomas Berge	Glen Faria	Henk Poort	Waylon
Zeester	Sylvia Geersen	Britt Dekker	Sylvia Geersen	Britt Dekker	Sylvia Geersen
Schaap	Pernille La Lau	Marieke Elsinga	Anniko van Santen	Pernille La Lau	Carice van Houten
Badeend	Jennifer Hoffman	Ilse Warringa	Roos Reedijk	Roxeanne Hazes	Ilse Warringa
Walrus	Sander Lantinga	Johnny de Mol	Johnny de Mol	Dennis van der Geest	Herman den Blijker
Hert	Bibi Breijman	Fatima Moreira de Melo	Natacha Harlequin	Bibi Breijman	Bibi Breijman
Buffel	Oscar Kazàn	Dries Roelvink	Fred van Leer	Ben Cramer	Hans Klok
Stinkdier	Steven Brunswijk	Patrick Martens	Patrick Martens	Patrick Martens	Rob Goossens
Eekhoorn	Marieke Elsinga	Nance Coolen	Marieke Elsinga	Marieke Elsinga	Marieke Elsinga
Magier	Douwe Bob	Douwe Bob	Waylon	Simon Keizer	Duncan Laurence
Koala	Thomas Dekker	Donnie	Donnie	Ammar Bozoglu	Walid Benmbarek
Toffe Peer	Mart Hoogkamer	Mart Hoogkamer	Mart Hoogkamer	Mart Hoogkamer	Mart Hoogkamer
Ijsbeer	Edson da Graça	Edson da Graça	Edson da Graça	Edson da Graça	Edson da Graça
Nijlpaard	Kim-Lian van der Meij	Kim-Lian van der Meij	Kim-Lian van der Meij	Kim-Lian van der Meij	Bettina Holwerda
Uil	Simone Kleinsma	Simone Kleinsma	Simone Kleinsma	Simone Kleinsma	Simone Kleinsma
Score	7	6	7	6	5

=== Episodes ===
==== Episode 1 ====
Original airdate: 10 November 2023

- Group performance: "Don't Worry" by Madcon

#	Stage Name	Song	Identity	Occupation	Result
1	Hippo	"Conga" by Gloria Estefan & Miami Sound Machine	undisclosed		SAFE
2	Grapes	"Tell Me More" by Son Mieux	Bert van Leeuwen	TV Presenter	OUT
3	Walrus	"La Bamba" by Ritchie Valens	undisclosed		SAFE
4	Dragonfly	"Toxic" by Britney Spears	Dionne Stax	Journalist	OUT
5	Skunk	"Don't Talk Just Kiss" by Right Said Fred	undisclosed		SAFE

==== Episode 2 ====
Original airdate: 17 November 2023

- Group performance: "Dynamite" by Taio Cruz

#	Stage Name	Song	Identity	Occupation	Result
1	Pufferfish	"Bella Ciao" by Maître Gims	Albert Verlinde	Producer	OUT
2	Koala	"Layla" by Claude	undisclosed		SAFE
3	Bonbon	"The Loco-Motion" by Kylie Minogue	Anky van Grunsven	Olympic Equestrian	OUT
4	Toffe Pear	"Stayin' Alive" by Bee Gees	undisclosed		SAFE
5	Squirrel	"9 to 5" by Dolly Parton	undisclosed		SAFE

==== Episode 3 ====
Original airdate: 24 November 2023

- Group performance: "Hold the Line" by Toto

#	Stage Name	Song	Identity	Occupation	Result
1	Garden Gnome	"Radar Love" by Golden Earring	William Rutten	Photographer	OUT
2	Rubber Duck	"Big Girl (You Are Beautiful)" by Mika	undisclosed		SAFE
3	Disco Ball	"Dancing on the Ceiling" by Lionel Richie	Hans van Breukelen	Former footballer	OUT
4	Owl	"Bright Eyes" by Rondé	undisclosed		SAFE
5	Polar Bear	"Blurred Lines" by Robin Thicke ft. Pharrell Williams & T.I.	undisclosed		SAFE

==== Episode 4 ====
Original airdate: 1 December 2023

- Group performance: "Symphony" by Sheppard

#	Stage Name	Song	Identity	Occupation	Result
1	Buffalo	"Big Spender" by Shirley Bassey	undisclosed		SAFE
2	Deer	"Window of Hope" by Oleta Adams	undisclosed		SAFE
3	Starfish	"We're Going to Ibiza" by Vengaboys	Britt Dekker	Presenter	OUT
4	Sheep	"Man! I Feel Like a Woman!" by Shania Twain	Anniko van Santen	Presenter	OUT
5	Magician	"24K Magic" by Bruno Mars	undisclosed		SAFE

==== Episode 5 ====
Original airdate: 8 December 2023

#	Stage Name	Song	Identity	Occupation	Result
1	Walrus	"Great Balls of Fire" by Jerry Lee Lewis	Jan Joost van Gangelen	Presenter	OUT
2	Rubber Duck	"2 Be Loved (Am I Ready)" by Lizzo	Tina de Bruin	Actress	OUT
3	Skunk	"You Make Me Feel (Mighty Real)" by Sylvester	undisclosed		SAFE
4	Toffe Pear	"Wake Me Up Before You Go-Go" by Wham!	undisclosed		SAFE
5	Hippo	"The Shoop Shoop Song (It's in His Kiss)" by Cher	undisclosed		SAFE
6	Koala	"Call It Love" by Felix Jaehn & Ray Dalton	undisclosed		SAFE

==== Episode 6 ====
Original airdate: 15 December 2023

#	Stage Name	Song	Identity	Occupation	Result
1	Deer	"Rhythm of the Night" by DeBarge	Natacha Harlequin	Lawyer	OUT
2	Polar Bear	"Footloose" by Kenny Loggins	undisclosed		SAFE
3	Buffalo	"Shake a Tail Feather" by Ray Charles	Ron Boszhard	Presenter	OUT
4	Squirrel	"Dance the Night" by Dua Lipa	undisclosed		SAFE
5	Magician	"Can't Hold Us" by Macklemore & Ryan Lewis	undisclosed		SAFE
6	Owl	"It's My Life" by Bon Jovi	undisclosed		SAFE

==== Episode 7 ====
Original airdate: 22 December 2023

#	Stage Name	Song	Identity	Occupation	Result
Round One
1	Skunk	"It's the Most Wonderful Time of the Year" by Andy Williams	undisclosed		RISK
1	Polar Bear	"It's the Most Wonderful Time of the Year" by Andy Williams	undisclosed		WIN
2	Owl	"Baby, It's Cold Outside" by Michael Bublé & Shania Twain	undisclosed		WIN
2	Magician	"Baby, It's Cold Outside" by Michael Bublé & Shania Twain	undisclosed		RISK
Sing-off details
5	Skunk	"Sleigh Ride" by The Ronettes	Guido Weijers	Comedian	OUT
5	Magician	"Sleigh Ride" by The Ronettes	undisclosed		SAFE
Round Two
3	Toffe Pear	"Shake Up Christmas" by Train	undisclosed		RISK
3	Koala	"Shake Up Christmas" by Train	undisclosed		WIN
4	Squirrel	"My Only Wish (This Year)" by Britney Spears	undisclosed		RISK
4	Hippo	"My Only Wish (This Year)" by Britney Spears	undisclosed		WIN
Sing-off details
6	Squirrel	"Feliz Navidad" by José Feliciano	Marieke Elsinga	Presenter	OUT
6	Toffe Pear	"Feliz Navidad" by José Feliciano	undisclosed		SAFE

==== Episode 8 ====
Original airdate: 29 December 2023

#	Stage Name	Song	Identity	Occupation	Result
1	Koala	"Baby" by Justin Bieber	Walid Benmbarek	Actor	OUT
2	Magician	"Alive" by Sia	Douwe Bob	Singer	OUT
3	Toffe Pear	"Love Really Hurts Without You" by Billy Ocean	undisclosed		SAFE
4	Owl	"It's Raining Men" by The Weather Girls	undisclosed		SAFE
5	Polar Bear	"I'll Be Waiting" by Cian Ducrot	undisclosed		SAFE
6	Hippo	"Queen of the Night" by Whitney Houston	undisclosed		SAFE

==== Episode 9 - Finale ====
Original airdate: 31 December 2023

#	Stage Name	Song	Duet Partner	Identity	Occupation	Result
1	Toffe Pear, Owl, Hippo & Polar Bear	"I'm So Excited" by The Pointer Sisters				
Round One
2	Toffe Pear	"Uptown Girl" by Billy Joel	Xander de Buisonjé	Mart Hoogkamer	Singer	OUT
3	Owl	"Total Eclipse of the Heart" by Bonnie Tyler	Jeroen van der Boom	undisclosed		SAFE
4	Hippo	"The Way You Make Me Feel" by Michael Jackson	Jim Bakkum	undisclosed		SAFE
5	Polar Bear	"Beauty and the Beast" from Beauty and the Beast	Emma Heesters	undisclosed		SAFE
Round Two
1	Hippo	"Tattoo" by Loreen		undisclosed		SAFE
2	Polar Bear	"This Is How We Do It" by Montell Jordan		Edson da Graça	Comedian	THIRD
3	Owl	"Voilà" by Barbara Pravi		undisclosed		SAFE
Round Three
1	Hippo	"Simply (The Best)" by Tina Turner		Kim-Lian van der Meij	Musical actress	RUNNER-UP
1	Owl	"Simply (The Best)" by Tina Turner		Simone Kleinsma	Musical actress	WINNER

== Season 6 ==
=== Contestants ===
Stage name	Celebrity	Occupation	Episodes								
Stage name	Celebrity	Occupation	1	2	3	4	5	6	7	8	9
Pegasus	Soy Kroon	Actor				SAFE		SAFE	WIN	SAFE	WINNER
Hedgehog (Egel)	Bettina Holwerda	Actress, Singer, & Dancer	SAFE				SAFE		WIN	SAFE	RUNNER-UP
Baboon (Baviaan)	Alex Klaasen	Comedian, Singer & Actor		SAFE			SAFE		RISK	SAFE	THIRD
Kangaroo (Kangaroe)	Yuki Kempees	Musician & Author				SAFE		SAFE	WIN	SAFE	FINALIST
Mammoth (Mammoet)	Holly Mae Brood	Actress & TV Presenter		SAFE			SAFE		WIN	OUT	
Marmot	Jandino Asporaat	Comedian & Actor			SAFE			SAFE	RISK	OUT	
Cyclops (Cycloop)	Vivienne van den Assem	Actress & Presenter			SAFE			SAFE	OUT		
Moon (Maan)	Numidia	Singer	SAFE				SAFE		OUT		
Eagle (Adelaar)	Jan Kooijman	Actor, Presentator & Dancer			SAFE			OUT			
Happy Egg (Blije Ei)	Arjan Ederveen	Actor & Comedian				SAFE		OUT			
Vampire (Vampier)	Danny de Munk	Singer & Actor		SAFE			OUT				
Turtle (Schildpad)	Nasrdin Dchar	Actor	SAFE				OUT				
Camel (Kameel)	Bob Sikkes & Roos Reedijk	TV Hosts				OUT					
Seahorse (Zeepaard)	Froukje de Both	Actress & TV Presenter				OUT					
Carrot (Wortel)	Donnie	Rapper			OUT						
Piggy Bank (Spaarvarken)	Imca Marina	Singer			OUT						
Ostrich (Struisvogel)	Jennifer Hoffman	Actress & TV Presenter		OUT							
Sour Bomb (Zure Bom)	Cornald Maas	TV Presenter & Writer		OUT							
Wolf	Eloise van Oranje	Dutch royal family member	OUT								
Raccoon (Wasbeer)	Jan de Hoop	TV Presenter	OUT								

The masked singer was safe from elimination.
The masked singer won their duet and was safe from elimination.
The masked singer was in the bottom of the episode and performed in a sing-off, but was ultimately safe from elimination.
The masked singer was eliminated from the competition and unmasked upon their elimination.
The masked singer did not perform.
The masked singer won the competition.
The masked singer finished second.
The masked singer finished third.
The masked singer finished fourth.

==== Final Guesses ====
	Monica	Buddy	Loretta	Carlo	Gerard
Wasbeer	Jan de Hoop	Jan de Hoop	Jan de Hoop	Jan de Hoop	Jan de Hoop
Wolf	Romee Strijd	Roxy Dekker	Estelle Cruijff	Anouk Smulders	Yolanthe Cabau
Zure Bom	Edwin van der Sar	John van 't Schip	Gordon	Rob Goossens	Giel Beelen
Struisvogel	Carice van Houten	Jennifer Hoffman	Carice van Houten	Roos Reedijk	Ellen ten Damme
Spaarvarken	Patricia Paay	Patricia Paay	Imca Marina	Imca Marina	Imca Marina
Wortel	Vieze Fur	Joost Klein	Vieze Fur	Kaj Gorgels	Epke Zonderland
Zeepaard	Maan de Steenwinkel	Barbara Sloesen	Inge de Bruin	Froukje de Both	Bettina Holwerda
Kameel	Suzan & Freek	Robert Doornbos & Chantal Bles	Suzan & Freek	Martien Meiland & Erica	Monique Smit & Kees Tol
Schildpad	Art Rooijakkers	Kees Tol	Juvat Westendorp	Juvat Westendorp	Jan Kooijman
Vampier	Donny Roelvink	Donny Roelvink	Maik de Boer	Donny Roelvink	Dave Roelvink
Blije Ei	Steven Kazàn	Gijs Rademaker	Gijs Rademaker	Alberto Stegeman	Johnny Kraaijkamp jr.
Adelaar	Jeroen van Koningsbrugge	Jan Kooijman	Jan Versteegh	Jan Kooijman	Jan Kooijman
Maan	Numidia	Numidia	Candy Dulfer	Angela Schijf	Jacqueline Govaert
Cycloop	Vivienne van den Assem	Vivienne van den Assem	Vivienne van den Assem	Leonie ter Braak	Leonie ter Braak
Marmot	Ruben van der Meer	Ruben van der Meer	Ruben van der Meer	Ruben van der Meer	Ruben van der Meer
Mammoet	Vajèn van den Bosch	Vajèn van den Bosch	Vajèn van den Bosch	Holly Mae Brood	Vajèn van den Bosch
Kangaroe	Yuki Kempees	Yuki Kempees	Joost Klein	Kraantje Pappie	Rico Verhoeven
Baviaan	Alex Klaasen	Alex Klaasen	Alex Klaasen	Alex Klaasen	Alex Klaasen
Egel	Davina Michelle	Roxeanne Hazes	Vajèn van den Bosch	Leonie ter Braak	Roxeanne Hazes
Pegasus	Charly Luske	Marcel Veenendaal	Charly Luske	Charly Luske	Charly Luske
Score	5	7	4	6	4

=== Episodes ===
==== Episode 1 ====
Original airdate: 15 November 2024

- Group performance: "Jump (For My Love)" by The Pointer Sisters

#	Stage Name	Song	Identity	Occupation	Result
1	Hedgehog	"Remember" by Becky Hill & David Guetta	undisclosed		SAFE
2	Raccoon	"Quando, Quando, Quando" by Engelbert Humperdinck	Jan de Hoop	TV Presenter	OUT
3	Turtle	"Maria (Un, Dos, Tres)" by Ricky Martin	undisclosed		SAFE
4	Wolf	"Houdini" by Dua Lipa	Eloise van Oranje	Dutch royal family member	OUT
5	Moon	"Hijo de la Luna" by Mecano	undisclosed		SAFE

==== Episode 2 ====
Original airdate: 22 November 2024

- Group performance: "What Makes You Beautiful" by One Direction

#	Stage Name	Song	Identity	Occupation	Result
1	Mammoth	"J'aime la vie" by Sandra Kim	undisclosed		SAFE
2	Sour Bomb	"Happy Together" by The Turtles	Cornald Maas	TV Presenter & Writer	OUT
3	Vampire	"Thriller" by Michael Jackson	undisclosed		SAFE
4	Ostrich	"Material Girl" by Madonna	Jennifer Hoffman	Actress & TV Presenter	OUT
5	Baboon	"The Greatest Show" from The Greatest Showman	undisclosed		SAFE

==== Episode 3 ====
Original airdate: 29 November 2024

- Group performance: "You Give Love a Bad Name" by Bon Jovi

#	Stage Name	Song	Identity	Occupation	Result
1	Eagle	"Not Over You" by Gavin DeGraw	undisclosed		SAFE
2	Piggy Bank	"Money Money Money" by ABBA	Imca Marina	Singer	OUT
3	Carrot	"Mambo No. 5" by Lou Bega	Donnie	Rapper	OUT
4	Cyclops	"Sex On Fire" by Kings Of Leon	undisclosed		SAFE
5	Marmot	"Ich Bin Wie Du" by Marianne Rosenberg	undisclosed		SAFE

==== Episode 4 ====
Original airdate: 6 December 2024

- Group performance: "I Don't Wanna Wait" by David Guetta and OneRepublic

#	Stage Name	Song	Identity	Occupation	Result
1	Camel	"Break My Stride" by Matthew Wilder	Bob Sikkes & Roos Reedijk	TV Hosts	OUT
2	Happy Egg	"Hit the Road Jack" by Ray Charles	undisclosed		SAFE
3	Seahorse	"Whatever" by Kygo and Ava Max	Froukje de Both	Actress & TV Presenter	OUT
4	Kangaroo	"Got the Feelin'" by Five	undisclosed		SAFE
5	Pegasus	"Best Fake Smile" by James Bay	undisclosed		SAFE

==== Episode 5 ====
Original airdate: 13 December 2024

#	Stage Name	Song	Identity	Occupation	Result
1	Turtle	"Closer" by Ne-Yo	Nasrdin Dchar	Actor	OUT
2	Hedgehog	"Let's Hear It for the Boy" by Deniece Williams	undisclosed		SAFE
3	Vampire	"Relight My Fire" by Dan Hartman	Danny de Munk	Singer & Actor	OUT
4	Baboon	"Maniac" by Michael Sembello	undisclosed		SAFE
5	Moon	"Is It Love" by Loreen	undisclosed		SAFE
6	Mammoth	"Gimme! Gimme! Gimme!" by ABBA	undisclosed		SAFE

==== Episode 6 ====
Original airdate: 20 December 2024

#	Stage Name	Song	Identity	Occupation	Result
1	Cyclops	"Rainbow In the Sky" by DJ Paul Elstak	undisclosed		SAFE
2	Happy Egg	"Born to Be Wild" by Steppenwolf	Arjan Ederveen	Actor & comedian	OUT
3	Pegasus	"Man in the Mirror" by Michael Jackson	undisclosed		SAFE
4	Eagle	"Dangerous" by David Guetta ft. Sam Martin	Jan Kooijman	Actor, Presentator & Dancer	OUT
5	Marmot	"Super Freak" by Rick James	undisclosed		SAFE
6	Kangaroo	"Mysterious Girl" by Peter André	undisclosed		SAFE

==== Episode 7 ====
Original airdate: 27 December 2024

#	Stage Name	Song	Identity	Occupation	Result
Round One
1	Hedgehog	"No More Tears (Enough Is Enough)" by Barbra Streisand & Donna Summer	undisclosed		WIN
1	Moon	"No More Tears (Enough Is Enough)" by Barbra Streisand & Donna Summer	undisclosed		RISK
2	Marmot	"I Wanna Be The Only One" by Eternal	undisclosed		RISK
2	Mammoth	"I Wanna Be The Only One" by Eternal	undisclosed		WIN
Sing-off details
3	Moon	"Tragedy" by Bee Gees	Numidia	Singer	OUT
3	Marmot	"Tragedy" by Bee Gees	undisclosed		SAFE
Round Two
4	Kangaroo	"Wannabe" by Spice Girls	undisclosed		WIN
4	Cyclops	"Wannabe" by Spice Girls	undisclosed		RISK
5	Baboon	"Whataya Want From Me" by Adam Lambert	undisclosed		RISK
5	Pegasus	"Whataya Want From Me" by Adam Lambert	undisclosed		WIN
Sing-off details
6	Cyclops	"I Will Survive" by Gloria Gaynor	Vivienne van den Assem	Actress and Presenter	OUT
6	Baboon	"I Will Survive" by Gloria Gaynor	undisclosed		SAFE

==== Episode 8 ====
Original airdate: 3 January 2025

#	Stage Name	Song	Identity	Occupation	Result
1	Mammoth	"Believe" by Cher	Holly Mae Brood	Actress & TV Presenter	OUT
2	Pegasus	"Heroes" by Måns Zelmerlöw	undisclosed		SAFE
3	Marmot	"Bad" by Michael Jackson	Jandino Asporaat	Comedian & Actor	OUT
4	Hedgehog	"It Must Have Been Love" by Roxette	undisclosed		SAFE
5	Kangaroo	"Without You" by Usher	undisclosed		SAFE
6	Baboon	"Rise Like a Phoenix" by Conchita Wurst	undisclosed		SAFE

==== Episode 9 - Finale ====
Original airdate: 4 January 2025

#	Stage Name	Song	Duet Partner	Identity	Occupation	Result
Round One
1	Baboon	"Why Tell Me Why" by Anita Meyer	Richard Groenendijk & Anita Meyer	undisclosed		SAFE
2	Hedgehog	"You Don't Own Me" by Lesley Gore	Mart Hoogkamer	undisclosed		SAFE
3	Pegasus	"Don't Stop Believin'" by Journey	Kim-Lian	undisclosed		SAFE
4	Kangaroo	"Empire State Of Mind" by Alicia Keys & Jay-Z	Berget Lewis	Yuki Kempees	Musician	OUT
Round Two
1	Baboon	"I Have Nothing" by Whitney Houston		Alex Klaasen	Comedian, Singer & Actor	THIRD
2	Hedgehog	"...Baby One More Time" by Britney Spears		undisclosed		SAFE
3	Pegasus	"Beautiful Things" by Benson Boone		undisclosed		SAFE
Round Three
1	Hedgehog	"We Will Rock You" / "We Are the Champions" by Queen		Bettina Holwerda	Actress, Singer, & Dancer	RUNNER-UP
1	Pegasus	"We Will Rock You" / "We Are the Champions" by Queen		Soy Kroon	Actor	WINNER

== Season 7 ==
=== Contestants ===
Stage name	Celebrity	Occupation	Episodes								
Stage name	Celebrity	Occupation	1	2	3	4	5	6	7	8	9
Glamourpoes	April Darby	Singer & Musical actress	SAFE				SAFE		WIN	SAFE	WINNER
Peacock (Pauw)	Yves Berendse	Singer		SAFE				SAFE	RISK	SAFE	RUNNER-UP
Cowboy	Freek Bartels	Singer, Musical actor & Presenter				SAFE		SAFE	WIN	SAFE	THIRD
Beunhare (Beunhaas)	Koen van Heest	Musician, YouTuber & Entrepreneur				SAFE		SAFE	RISK	SAFE	FINALIST
Guinea Pigs (Cavias)	Plien van Bennekom	Cabaret duo		SAFE			SAFE		WIN	OUT	
Guinea Pigs (Cavias)	Bianca Krijgsman	Cabaret duo		SAFE			SAFE		WIN	OUT	
Okapi	Hadewych Minis	Actress & Singer			SAFE			SAFE	WIN	OUT	
Seal (Zeehond)	Georgina Verbaan	Actress & Singer	SAFE				SAFE		OUT		
Cow (Koe)	Lex Uiting	Journalist & Singer	SAFE				SAFE		OUT		
Dachshund (Teckel)	Sjoerd van Ramshorst	Presenter			SAFE			OUT			
Clogs (Klompen)	Coen Swijnenberg	Radio DJ's				SAFE		OUT			
Clogs (Klompen)	Sander Lantinga	Radio DJ's				SAFE		OUT			
Seagull (Meeuw)	Frank Dane	Radio DJ			SAFE		OUT				
Sloth (Luiaard)	Valerio Zeno	TV Presenter & Actor		SAFE			OUT				
Bear (Beer)	Angela Groothuizen	Singer & Presenter				OUT					
Caterpillar (Rups)	Fidan Ekiz	Presenter				OUT					
Donkey (Ezel)	Roué Verveer	Comedian & TV Presenter			OUT						
Chick (Kuiken)	Estelle Cruijff	Actress & Model			OUT						
Train (Trein)	Jeroen Snel	TV Presenter & Journalist		OUT							
Coupe Royale	Pauline Wingelaar	Presenter & TV Personality		OUT							
Party Animal (Feestbeest)	Kluun	Author	OUT								
Cotton Candy (Suikerspin)	Marga Bult	Singer & Presenter	OUT								

The masked singer was safe from elimination.
The masked singer was eliminated from the competition and unmasked upon their elimination.
The masked singer won their duet and was safe from elimination.
The masked singer was in the bottom of the episode and performed in a sing-off, but was ultimately safe from elimination.
The masked singer did not perform.
The masked singer won the competition.
The masked singer finished second.
The masked singer finished third.
The masked singer was a finalist.

==== Final Guesses ====
	Team Monica & Buddy		Team Carlo & Gerard	
	Monica	Buddy	Gerard	Carlo
Suikerspin	Rachel Hazes	Goedele Liekens	Bonnie St. Claire	Marga Bult
Feestbeest	Morad El Ouakili	Morad El Ouakili	René Karst	Kees van der Spek
Coupe Royale	Natasja Froger	Airen Mylene	Natasja Froger	Natasja Froger
Trein	Arie Boomsma	Viktor Brand	Viktor Brand	Viktor Brand
Kuiken	Sylvia Geersen	Sylvia Geersen	Fatima Moreira de Melo	Olga Commandeur
Ezel	Jörgen Raymann	Jörgen Raymann	Ruben van der Meer	Rayen Panday
Rups	Angela de Jong	Leonie ter Braak	Leonie ter Braak	Leonie ter Braak
Beer	Merel Westrik	Merel Westrik	Angela Groothuizen	Angela Groothuizen
Luiaard	Valerio Zeno	Valerio Zeno	Kaj Gorgels	Dave von Raven
Meeuw	Bram Krikke	Rob Goossens	Frank Dane	Jeroen Kijk in de Vegte
Klompen	The Opposites	Vincent Visser & Bas Muijs	Ferri Somogyi & Bas Muijs	Kees Boot & Cas Jansen
Teckel	Beau van Erven Dorens	Johnny de Mol	Johnny Kraaijkamp jr.	Johnny Kraaijkamp jr.
Koe	Lex Uiting	Lex Uiting	Roy Donders	Lex Uiting
Zeehond	Georgina Verbaan	Georgina Verbaan	Georgina Verbaan	Georgina Verbaan
Okapi	Elise Schaap	Elise Schaap	Elise Schaap	Hadewych Minis
Cavia's	Plien & Bianca	Plien & Bianca	Loïs Lane	Plien & Bianca
Beunhaas	Koen van Heest	Koen van Heest	Kraantje Pappie	Koen van Heest
Cowboy	Freek Bartels	Freek Bartels	Freek Bartels	Freek Bartels
Pauw	Yves Berendse	Yves Berendse	Yves Berendse	Yves Berendse
Glamourpoes	April Darby	April Darby	Glennis Grace	Glennis Grace
Individual score	9	9	5	10
Team score	18		15	

- Klompen & Cavia's were worth 2 points, one for each correct guessed person.

=== Episodes ===
==== Episode 1 ====
Original airdate: 14 November 2025

- Group performance: "Stop" by Spice Girls

#	Stage Name	Song	Identity	Occupation	Result
1	Party Animal	"Sweet Caroline" by Neil Diamond	Kluun	Author	OUT
2	Seal	"I Wanna Dance with Somebody" by Whitney Houston	undisclosed		SAFE
3	Cotton Candy	"I Can't Help Myself" by Four Tops	Marga Bult	Singer & Presenter	OUT
4	Cow	"Verdammt, ich lieb' dich" by Matthias Reim	undisclosed		SAFE
5	Glamourpoes	"Training Season" by Dua Lipa	undisclosed		SAFE

==== Episode 2 ====
Original airdate: 21 November 2025

- Group performance: "APT." by Bruno Mars & Rosé

#	Stage Name	Song	Identity	Occupation	Result
1	Guinea Pigs	"Love Me Just a Little Bit More" by Dolly Dots	undisclosed		SAFE
2	Sloth	"Reet Petite" by Jackie Wilson	undisclosed		SAFE
3	Train	"Per spoor (Kedeng kedeng)" by Guus Meeuwis	Jeroen Snel	TV Presenter & Journalist	OUT
4	Coupe Royale	"Ooh Aah... Just a Little Bit" by Gina G	Pauline Wingelaar	Presenter	OUT
5	Peacock	"Nessun dorma" by Luciano Pavarotti	undisclosed		SAFE

==== Episode 3 ====
Original airdate: 28 November 2025

- Group performance: "Give It Up" by KC and The Sunshine Band

#	Stage Name	Song	Identity	Occupation	Result
1	Donkey	"Never Gonna Give You Up" by Rick Astley	Roué Verveer	Comedian & TV Presenter	OUT
2	Dachshund	"She's a Lady" by Tom Jones	undisclosed		SAFE
3	Chick	"Shalala Lala" by Walkers	Estelle Cruijff	Actress	OUT
4	Seagull	"Nel blu, dipinto di blu" by Domenico Modugno	undisclosed		SAFE
5	Okapi	"I'm Coming Out" by Diana Ross	undisclosed		SAFE

==== Episode 4 ====
Original airdate: 5 December 2025

- Group performance: "So What" by P!nk

#	Stage Name	Song	Identity	Occupation	Result
1	Beunhare	"Hot n Cold" by Katy Perry	undisclosed		SAFE
2	Bear	"Little Green Bag" by George Baker Selection	Angela Groothuizen	Singer & Presenter	OUT
3	Clogs	"Ding-a-dong" by Teach-In	undisclosed		SAFE
4	Caterpillar	"Crying at the Discoteque" by Alcazar	Fidan Ekiz	Presenter	OUT
5	Cowboy	"Texas Hold 'Em" by Beyoncé	undisclosed		SAFE

==== Episode 5 ====
Original airdate: 12 December 2025

#	Stage Name	Song	Identity	Occupation	Result
1	Sloth	"Copacabana" by Barry Manilow	Valerio Zeno	TV Presenter & Actor	OUT
2	Glamourpoes	"Abacadabra" by Lady Gaga	undisclosed		SAFE
3	Cow	"Take Me Home, Country Roads" by John Denver	undisclosed		SAFE
4	Seagull	"Blame It on the Boogie" by The Jacksons	Frank Dane	Radio DJ	OUT
5	Seal	"1-2-3" by Gloria Estefan and the Miami Sound Machine	undisclosed		SAFE
6	Guinea Pigs	"Touch Me There" by Total Touch	undisclosed		SAFE

==== Episode 6 ====
Original airdate: 19 December 2025

#	Stage Name	Song	Identity	Occupation	Result
1	Cowboy	"Smooth Criminal" by Michael Jackson	undisclosed		SAFE
2	Clogs	"Rio" by Maywood	Coen Swijnenberg	Radio DJ's	OUT
2	Clogs	"Rio" by Maywood	Sander Lantinga	Radio DJ's	OUT
3	Peacock	"GoldenEye" by Tina Turner	undisclosed		SAFE
4	Beunhare	"Best Song Ever" by One Direction	undisclosed		SAFE
5	Dachshund	"The Door" by Teddy Swims	Sjoerd van Ramshorst	Presenter	OUT
6	Okapi	"Rise Up" by Andra Day	undisclosed		SAFE

==== Episode 7 ====
Original airdate: 26 December 2025

#	Stage Name	Song	Identity	Occupation	Result
Round One
1	Guinea Pigs	"Rockin' Around the Christmas Tree" by Brenda Lee	undisclosed		WIN
1	Beunhare	"Rockin' Around the Christmas Tree" by Brenda Lee	undisclosed		RISK
2	Cowboy	"Merry Christmas Everyone" by Shakin' Stevens	undisclosed		WIN
2	Cow	"Merry Christmas Everyone" by Shakin' Stevens	undisclosed		RISK
Sing-off details
3	Beunhare	"Jingle Bell Rock" by Bobby Helms	undisclosed		SAFE
3	Cow	"Jingle Bell Rock" by Bobby Helms	Lex Uiting	Journalist & Singer	OUT
Round Two
4	Seal	"Santa, Can't You Hear Me" by Kelly Clarkson and Ariana Grande	undisclosed		RISK
4	Okapi	"Santa, Can't You Hear Me" by Kelly Clarkson and Ariana Grande	undisclosed		WIN
5	Peacock	"Christmas (Baby Please Come Home)" by Mariah Carey	undisclosed		RISK
5	Glamourpoes	"Christmas (Baby Please Come Home)" by Mariah Carey	undisclosed		WIN
Sing-off details
6	Seal	"Why Couldn't It Be Christmas Every Day?" by Bianca Ryan	Georgina Verbaan	Actress & Singer	OUT
6	Peacock	"Why Couldn't It Be Christmas Every Day?" by Bianca Ryan	undisclosed		SAFE

==== Episode 8 ====
Original airdate: 2 January 2026

#	Stage Name	Song	Identity	Occupation	Result
1	Okapi	"Think" by Aretha Franklin	Hadewych Minis	Actress & Singer	OUT
2	Guinea Pigs	"Dancing Queen" by ABBA	Plien van Bennekom	Cabaret duo	OUT
2	Guinea Pigs	"Dancing Queen" by ABBA	Bianca Krijgsman	Cabaret duo	OUT
3	Peacock	"Hero" by Mariah Carey	undisclosed		SAFE
4	Beunhare	"Yeah 3x" by Chris Brown	undisclosed		SAFE
5	Glamourpoes	"Golden" from KPop Demon Hunters	undisclosed		SAFE
6	Cowboy	"Proud Mary" by Tina Turner	undisclosed		SAFE

==== Episode 9 - Finale ====
Original airdate: 9 January 2026

- Group performance: "Hold On I'm Coming" by Sam & Dave

#	Stage Name	Song	Duet partner	Identity	Occupation	Result
Round One
1	Glamourpoes	"Show Me How You Burlesque" by Christina Aguilera	Numidia	undisclosed		SAFE
2	Cowboy	"I Don't Want to Miss a Thing" by Aerosmith	Soy Kroon	undisclosed		SAFE
3	Beunhare	"All Star" by Smash Mouth	Yuki Kempees	Koen van Heest	Musician, YouTuber & Entrepreneur	OUT
4	Peacock	"Vivo per lei" by Andrea Bocelli	Bettina Holwerda	undisclosed		SAFE
Round Two
1	Cowboy	"One Night Only" from Dreamgirls		Freek Bartels	Singer, Musical actor & Presenter	THIRD
2	Peacock	"Nobody Else" by René Froger		undisclosed		SAFE
3	Glamourpoes	"All by Myself" by Eric Carmen		undisclosed		SAFE
Round Three
1	Glamourpoes	"This Is the Moment" by Jeckyll & Hyde		April Darby	Singer & Musical actress	WINNER
1	Peacock	"This Is the Moment" by Jeckyll & Hyde		Yves Berendse	Singer	RUNNER-UP

== New Year's Special (2020/2021) ==
- Group performance: "The Final Countdown" by Europe

#	Stage Name	Song	Identity	Occupation	Result
Round One
1	Fireworks	"Let's Get Loud" by Jennifer Lopez	Caroline Tensen	Presenter and actress	OUT
2	Clock	"It's A Beautiful Day" by Michael Bublé	John van den Heuvel	Journalist	OUT
3	Snowman	"Savage Love" by Jason Derulo	Frans Bauer	Singer	OUT
4	Oliebol	"Waterloo" by ABBA	undisclosed		SAFE
5	Champagne Bottle	"Livin' on a Prayer" by Bon Jovi	undisclosed		SAFE
Round Two (Duet)
6	Oliebol	"Firework" by Katy Perry	Richard Groenendijk	Cabaret artist	RUNNER-UP
6	Champagne Bottle	"Firework" by Katy Perry	Edsilia Rombley	Singer	WINNER

== New Year's Special (2021/2022) ==
- Group performance: "Disco Inferno" by The Trammps
- Group performance: "Hangover" by Taio Cruz feat. Flo Rida

#	Stage Name	Song	Identity	Occupation	Result
Round One
1	Oliebol	"(I Can't Get No) Satisfaction" by The Rolling Stones	undisclosed		SAFE
2	Champagne	"Womanizer" by Britney Spears	Leontine Ruiters	Actress	OUT
3	Snowman	"Habanera" by Georges Bizet	undisclosed		SAFE
4	Firework	"Sway" by Michael Bublé	Jack van Gelder	Presenter	OUT
5	Christmas Tree	"Somebody to Love" by Queen	undisclosed		SAFE
6	Clock	"Last Dance" by Donna Summer	undisclosed		SAFE
Round Two
1	Christmas Tree	"When I Was Your Man" by Bruno Mars	undisclosed		SAFE
2	Clock	"Love Again" by Dua Lipa	Quinty Trustfull	Actress	THIRD
3	Oliebol	"She Bangs" by Ricky Martin	Robert ten Brink	Presenter	OUT
4	Snowman	"Super Bass" by Nicki Minaj	undisclosed		SAFE
Round Three
1
1	Snowman	"Raise Your Glass" by Pink	Trijntje Oosterhuis	Singer	RUNNER-UP
1	Christmas Tree	"Raise Your Glass" by Pink	Nick Schilder	Singer	WINNER

== New Year's Special (2022/2023) ==
#	Stage Name	Song	Identity	Occupation	Result
Round One
1	Reindeer	"Take Me to Your Heaven" by Charlotte Nilsson	Leco van Zadelhoff	Stylist	OUT
2	Christmas Tree	"About Damn Time" by Lizzo	Jelka van Houten	Actress	OUT
3	Oliebol	"Strong Enough" by Cher	Irene Moors	Presenter	THIRD
4	Clockwork	"Rock Your Body" by Justin Timberlake	undisclosed		SAFE
5	Snowman	"This Woman's Work" by Maxwell	undisclosed		SAFE
Round Two
6
6	Clockwork	"Flashdance... What a Feeling" by Irene Cara	John Williams	Presenter	RUNNER-UP
6	Snowman	"Flashdance... What a Feeling" by Irene Cara	Jim Bakkum	Singer	WINNER

== King's Day Special (2026) ==
#	Stage Name	Song	Identity	Occupation	Result
Round One
1	Bitterbal	"Baila de Gasolina" by Effe Serieus	Bas Smit	Influencer & entrepreneur	THIRD
2	Tompouce	"Sugardaddy" by Roxy Dekker	Leonie ter Braak	TV presenter & actress	OUT
3	Apple of orange	"Vrede" by Ruth Jacott	undisclosed		SAFE
4	Lion	"Circle of Life" from The Lion King	undisclosed		SAFE
5	Prince lager	"Just Say Hello" by René Froger	Wesley Sneijder	Former professional footballer	OUT
Round Two
6
6	Apple of orange	"You'll Never Walk Alone" by Lee Towers	Sanne Wallis de Vries	Comedian & actor	RUNNER-UP
6	Lion	"You'll Never Walk Alone" by Lee Towers	Tino Martin	Singer	WINNER

=== Final Guesses ===
	Team Monica & Buddy		Team Carlo & Gerard	
	Monica	Buddy	Gerard	Carlo
Tompouce	Daphne Bunskoek	Daphne Bunskoek	Nikkie Plessen	Nikkie Plessen
Prins pils	Wesley Sneijder	Wesley Sneijder	Wesley Sneijder	Wesley Sneijder
Bitterbal	Kaj Gorgels	Kaj Gorgels	Giel de Winter	Giel de Winter
Appeltje van oranje	Ilse Warringa	Ilse Warringa	Ilse Warringa	Chantal Janzen
Leeuw	Tino Martin	Tino Martin	Tino Martin	Tino Martin
Individual score	2	2	2	2
Team score	4		4	

== Ratings ==
=== Season 1 ===
Episode	Date	Viewers
1	27 September 2019	1,498,000
2	4 October 2019	1,393,000
3	11 October 2019	1,513,000
4	18 October 2019	1,556,000
5	25 October 2019	1,803,000
6	1 November 2019	1,931,000

=== Season 2 ===
Episode	Date	Viewers
1	25 September 2020	1,966,000
2	2 October 2020	2,182,000
3	9 October 2020	2,299,000
4	16 October 2020	2,561,000
5	23 October 2020	2,746,000
6	30 October 2020	2.966.000
7	6 November 2020	2.934.000
8	13 November 2020	3.860.000

=== Season 3 ===
Episode	Date	Viewers
1	15 October 2021	2.367.000
2	22 October 2021	2.125.000
3	29 October 2021	2.071.000
4	5 November 2021	2.330.000
5	12 November 2021	2.117.000
6	19 November 2021	2.440.000
7	26 November 2021	2.424.000
8	3 December 2021	2.618.000
9	10 December 2021	2.630.000
10	17 December 2021	2.569.000

=== Season 4 ===
Episode	Date	Viewers
1	4 November 2022	2.233.000
2	11 November 2022	2.164.000
3	18 November 2022	2.091.000
4	25 November 2022	1.937.000
5	2 December 2022	1.985.000
6	9 December 2022	819.000
7	16 December 2022	1.939.000
8	23 December 2022	1.858.000
9	30 December 2022	2.173.000

=== Season 5 ===
Episode	Date	Viewers
1	10 November 2023	2.534.000
2	17 November 2023	2.478.000
3	24 November 2023	2.323.000
4	1 December 2023	2.163.000
5	8 December 2023	2.199.000
6	15 December 2023	2.091.000
7	22 December 2023	2.317.000
8	29 December 2023	2.310.000
9	31 December 2023	2.385.000

=== Season 6 ===
Episode	Date	Viewers
1	15 November 2024	2.409.000
2	22 November 2024	2.176.000
3	29 November 2024	2.268.000
4	6 December 2024	2.361.000
5	13 December 2024	2.402.000
6	20 December 2024	2.234.000
7	27 December 2024	2.383.000
8	3 January 2025	2.595.000
9	4 January 2025	3.046.000

=== Season 7 ===
Episode	Date	Viewers
1	14 November 2025	2.194.000
2	21 November 2025	2.285.000
3	28 November 2025	2.067.000
4	5 December 2025	1.971.000
5	12 December 2025	2.142.000
6	19 December 2025	2.084.000
7	26 December 2025	2.044.000
8	2 January 2026	2.205.000
9	9 January 2026	2.450.000

=== Specials ===
Episode	Date	Viewers
New Year's 2020	31 December 2020	2.388.000
New Year's 2021	31 December 2021	1.925.000
New Year's 2021	1 January 2021	2.280.000
New Year's 2022	31 December 2022	1.695.000
Kingsday 2026	27 April 2026	1.554.000

Indicates a new viewer record at the time.
