= Toine van Peperstraten =

Dutch sports journalist

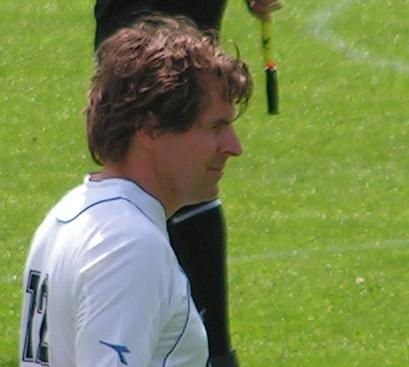
Toine van Peperstraten.

Toine van Peperstraten (born 18 December 1967 in Achthuizen, South Holland) is a Dutch sports journalist, best known for hosting the NOS TV sports program Studio Sport.

== Career ==
Being a celebrity, he also participated in the 2006 edition of Wie is... de Mol?, the series' second celebrity edition. Since February 2019, Van Peperstraten is the presenter of the NPO Radio 2 program 't Get Nu Laat from WNL and thus returned to NPO Radio 2. And since 2020 he also presents the program Stax&Toine with Dionne Stax on NPO Radio 1 from Monday to Thursday. Since March 2021, he has been presenting the program with Mischa Blok and it is called Blok&Toine.

In 2022, he appeared in the television show The Masked Singer.

== Humanitarian work ==
Toine is Ambassador for the Eye Care Foundation and Parasports.
