= Singapura (song) =

Singapura is a song composed by John Möring. (Note: It is frequently misattributed to "Van Moring") The original Malay lyrics were written by Roy Vanling. It was first performed in 1963 by several performers. Sandra Reemer performed it in Malay, Ilonka Biluska and Betty Fransen performed it in Dutch, and Imca Marina performed it in separate English, Malay, and German versions. The version performed by Sandra Reemer was exported to Singapore and Malaysia in collaboration with Malaysian Airways.

A new set of lyrics were also written, in Malay and English, by David Lim Kim San.

In 1980, it was released again in English, with yet another set of lyrics written by the Singapore Broadcasting Corporation, under the title Singapura, Sunny Island. These lyrics were also expanded upon into a rap version by Dick Lee in 1996, which also samples Sandra Reemer's version.
