= Imca Marina =

Dutch pop singer and writer

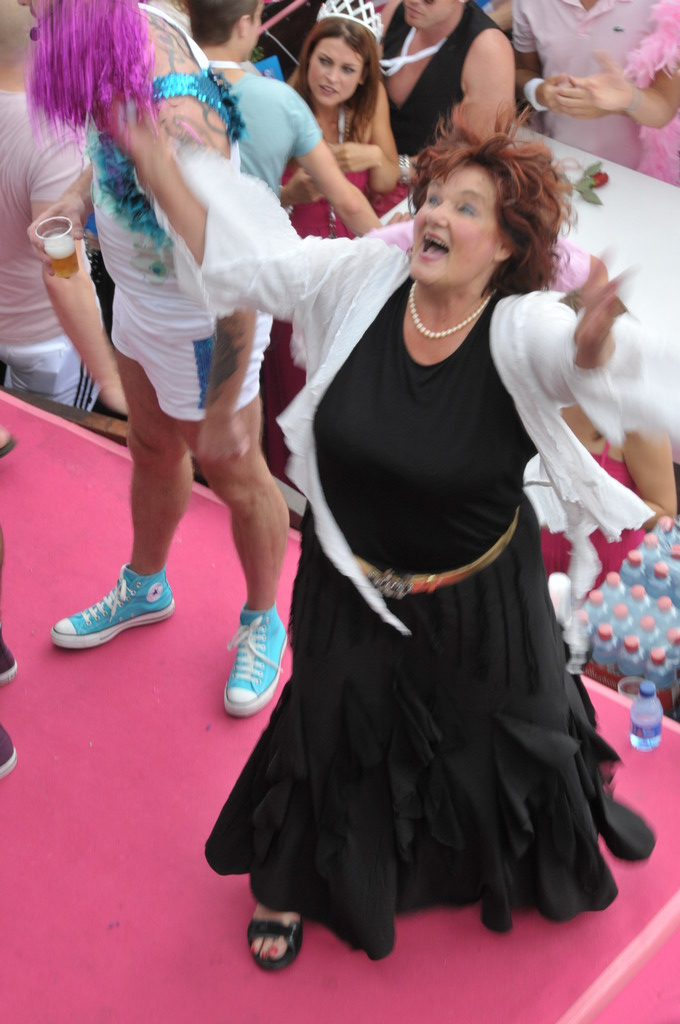
Image of Imca Marina

Hendrikje Imca Bijl (born 13 May 1941 in Zuidbroek), known as Imca Marina, is a Dutch pop singer and writer.

== Biography ==
Bijl, born the daughter of an electrical engineer, achieved success beyond the German-speaking world in 1972 with the pop song Viva España (The Sun Shines Day and Night), which remained a one-off. In addition to several other German-language hits, the singer enjoyed lasting success in her Dutch homeland.

She subsequently made a name for herself there as a writer.

She formed her stage names from her middle name and her mother's middle name.

Imca Marina lives on a farm in Midwolda in the municipality of Scheemda, province of Groningen. In July 2009, it was announced that she had separated from her partner Steven Porter after a 13-year relationship. She has a son from a previous marriage.

She appeared in a 2024 episode of the television show The Masked Singer.

In 2026, she had a fall and suffered a broken wrist.

== Discography ==
=== Albums ===
Album title	Release date	Charting in the Dutch Album Top 100			Comments
Album title	Release date	Date of entry	Highest	Weeks	Comments
De beste	1965	-			
Imca's troeven	1967	-			
Imca, d'r stait 'n vrijer aan de deur	1968	-			Groningse liedjes
Imca Marina	1970	-			
Imca Marina	1972	-			
Bella Italia	1973	-			
Veertien successen	1974	-			
Gouden successen	1979	-			Verzamelalbum
Viva Marina	1980	-			Verzamelalbum
Hartenvrouw	1981	22-08-1981	40	2	
Verloren liederen	1988	-			
Het beste van Imca Marina	1989	-			Verzamelalbum
Imca Marina	1992	19-09-1992	55	6	
Imca Marina	1994	-			Gedigitaliseerd album Hartenvrouw uit 1981
Einfach das beste	1996	-			Verzamelalbum
La Mamma	1996	-			
Imca Marina	2001	-			Verzamelalbum Hollands Glorie
Viva España	2002	-			Verzamelalbum Hit Expresse

=== Singles ===
Single title	Release date	Charting in the Dutch Top 40			Comments
Single title	Release date	Date of entry	Highest	Weeks	Comments
IMPERIAL uitgaven 1959 t/m 1966 Pre-Top 40					
Morgen / Net zestien jaar	1959	02-01-1960	3	9	nr. 3 in Muziek Parade
Music maestro please / In mijn herinnering	1960	-			
Valentino / Hoor je mijn stem in the bergen	1960	-			
Laat mij alleen / Havenlicht	1960	-			
Zeg het met bloemen / Mooie gladiolen	1961	-			
Twee gouden sterren / Zeven rozen uit Santa Monica	1962	-			
Taboe! / Waar zacht een mandoline klinkt	1962	-			
Soerabaja / Mr. Wind ga naar Mexico	1963	16-03-1963	1	16	nr. 1 in Muziek Parade, Muziek Expres en Platennieuws
Lass' mein Herz nicht weinen / Melodia Hawaiiana	1963	15-11-1963	9	3	
Singapoera / Taboe	1963	-			
Tijd voor Teenagers Top 10					
Über den Wolken ist Sonnenschein / Singapura	1964	08-02-1964	8	5	
Harlekino / Eldorado	1964	08-08-1964	2	21	nr. 3 in the Tijd Voor Teenagers Top 10
Lass' mein Herz nicht weinen	1964	12-12-1964	41	3	
Nur nicht weinen / Eldorado	1964	-			
Nederlandse Top 40					
Harlekino	1964	02-01-1965	5	8	
Heel de wereld kun je kopen / In 't hartje van Parijs	1965	-			
Santo Domingo	1965	05-06-1965	6	19	
Nimm den Kuss als Souvenir / In deinen Armen	1966	-			
Antonio / Eenzaam en alleen	1966	-			
PHILIPS uitgaven 1967 t/m 1971					
Wieken draaien door de wind / Allemaal rijden op zondag	1967	-			
Dagen van geluk / Heimwee	1968	-			
Liefde is toch geen spiegelei / Fiesta gitana	1968	-			
Sacha / Prima ballerina	1969	19-04-1969	tip17	-	
Jij, jij was voor mij / Houdt hij van mij	1970	-			
Tausend Tränen / Liebling weine nicht	1971	-			
IMPERIAL/EMI uitgaven 1972 t/m 1980					
Viva España / Jij bent heel mijn leven	1972	01-04-1972	15	5	nr. 17 in the Daverende Dertig / Alarmschijf
Vakantie voorbij	1972	14-10-1972	tip16		cover of Gira l'amore (caro bebè)
Bella Italia	1973	07-07-1973	19	7	nr. 20 in the Daverende Dertig
Am Abend kommen die Träume	1974	29-06-1974	21	6	nr. 23 in the Nationale Hitparade
Manuel / Ein Sommer ohne Liebe	1974	-			
Bella España / Vakantie voorbij	1974	-			
Vino (Waar blijft de wijn) / De zon in Odessa	1975	14-06-1975	4	10	A-kant: cover of Lu maritiello / nr. 4 in the Nationale Hitparade
Cin cin amore mio / Sunny boy	1975	-			A-kant: cover of Cielito Lindo
Fiësta nuda / Zon, zomer en amore	1976	31-07-1976	27	4	nr. 24 in the Nationale Hitparade
Vannacht / Gino	1977	19-11-1977	26	5	nr. 18 in the Nationale Hitparade
De carrousel van geluk / Laat de zon niet ondergaan	1978	-			A-kant: cover of Bailemos un vals
Flamenco español / Costa del amor	1979	-			
Zwart zwart zwart / Vaders been	1979	26-01-1980	tip19	-	
Ik ga naar Ameland / Maria, la la la	1980	-			
CNR uitgaven 1981 t/m 1984					
Ook als ik er niet ben / Kind van vroeger	1981	25-07-1981	tip11	-	B-kant: cover of Ailleurs / nr. 39 in the Nationale Hitparade
Meissie van de vlakte / Alcazar bij nacht	1981	-			
Het groene bos / Wie 't weet mag 't zeggen	1981	-			
De blauwe boon / Kreta	1982	-			
Er staat niks meer op de giro / Paradijs	1982	-			A-kant: cover of Mama dame cien pesetas
't Gaat wel over / Vrijheid	1983				A-kant: cover of El Noa Noa
Het Heer O. lied / Ik heb geen idee	1983	-			
Viva la fiësta (medley) / Carmen - Voor jou	1984	-			
Wijf van ijzer / M'n hart begint te bonzen	1985	-			
Hoor mij aan, pessimisten! / Van Zierikzee tot Ameland	1986	-			duetten met Pierre Kartner
Hava nagila party	1986	-			nr. 92 in the Nationale Hitparade
De zigeuners / Leugenaar	1988	-			A-kant: cover of Les Gitans / B-kant: cover of Malafemmena
Twee zwarte ogen / De ontmoeting	1988	-			A-kant: cover of El Relicario / B-kant: cover of Trastavera
De mooiste stad van het noorden	1989	-			A-kant: cover of Zum Spass / B-kant: Er zijn zoveel mooie steden van Henk Wijngaard
RCA uitgaven 1989 t/m 1992					
Spanje mi amor / Als je bij me bent	1989	08-07-1989	tip9	-	nr. 39 in the Nationale Hitparade
Oh Brazil / instr	1990	-			tevens op mini-cd-single verschenen
Sing the Song / instr	1991	-			cover of Sólo le pido a Dios
Vive l'amor / Als je bij me bent	1992	-			
De muzikant / Vive l'amor	1992	-			
't Zwervertje / Barcelona	1992	-			
Mannen / Ik wil de zon	1993	18-12-1993	tip14	-	A-kant: cover of Comme facette mammeta
Maar als de zon weer onderging / Geen weg terug	1994	-			
Er is een schip gezonken / instr	1994	-			cover of In Hamburg ist noch Licht an
Desperado / De hartstocht is over	1996	-			A-kant: cover of Malagueña Salerosa / B-kant: cover of La Passione
Het kruisje van Piet / Madagascar	1997	-			A-kant: cover of The Wild Rover / samen met Piratenkoor Voorwaarts
De stoomtrein / Riet en Waterlied	1998	-			
Kermis in the stad	1999	-			duet met De Sjonnies / cover of Wien bleibt Wien
De dans / instr	1999	-			
X me honey / Medley / Cha cha tjaa	2000	-			
'n Heerlijke dag	2011	-			duet met Dario / nr. 56 in the Single Top 100
De carrousel van geluk	2013	-			cover of Bailemos un vals
Geestjes	2013	-			duet met Johan Vlemmix & Prak!!
Mannen overal!	2014	-			cover of Funiculì Funiculà
Scheurtjes	2015	-			cover of Beestjes
Vino, waar is het fout gegaan?	2015	-			cover of Vino vino zavrtelo nas je
De wals van de liefde	2016	-			cover of Take This Waltz
