= Yves Berendse =

Dutch singer (born 1993)

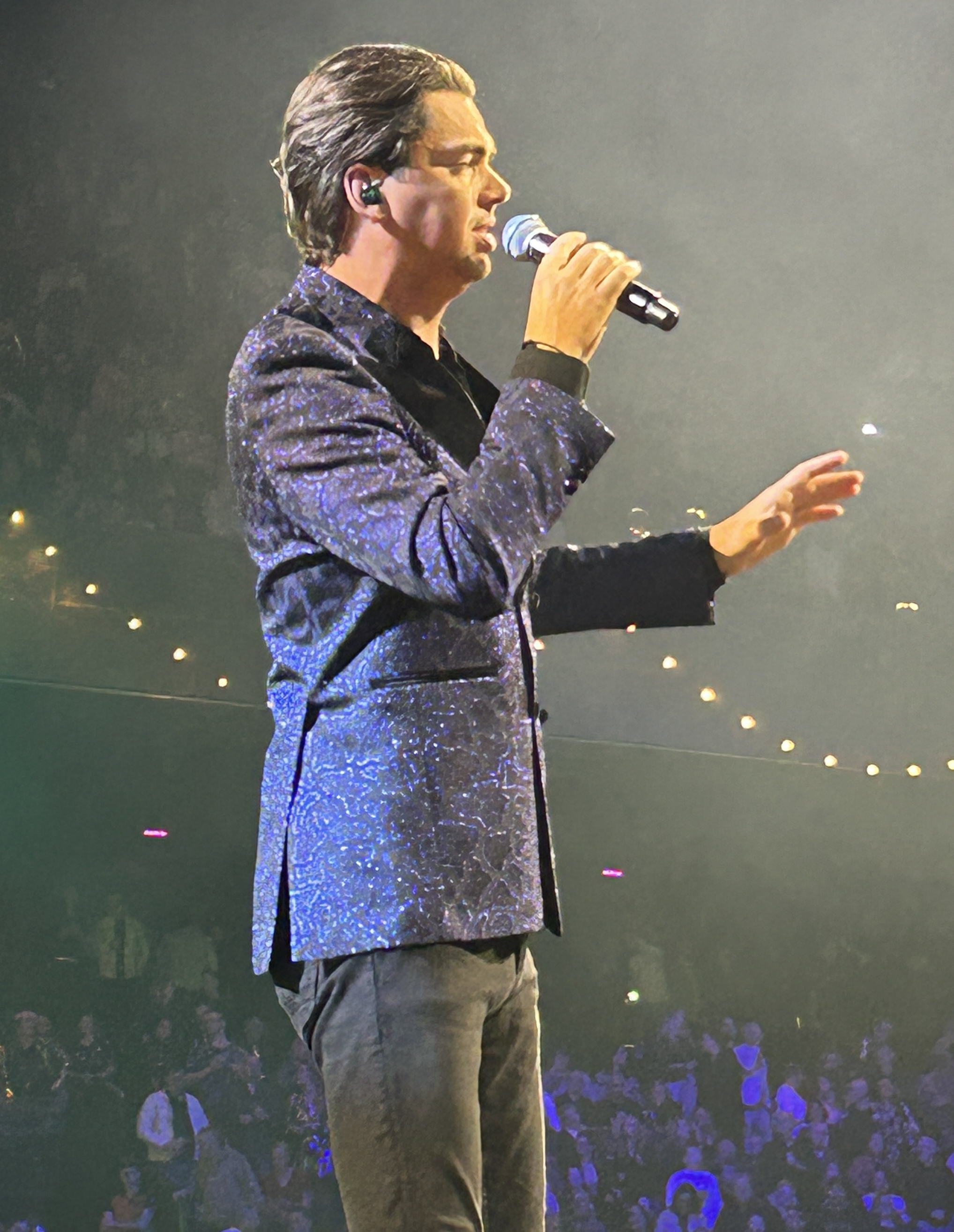
- Berendse at the Ziggo Dome in 2024

Background information
- Born: October 29, 1993 (age 32); Haarlem, Netherlands
- Origin: Zandvoort, Netherlands
- Genres: Levenslied
- Years active: 2015–present
- Labels: Dino Music
- Website: yvesberendse.nl

Yves Berendse (born 29 October 1993) is a Dutch singer from Zandvoort, North Holland.

In 2024, his song "Terug in de tijd" was number one in the Netherlands for six weeks.

== Career ==
Born in Haarlem and raised in Zandvoort, Berendse never had a professional ambition to be a singer. He worked at a sandwich shop. Then, on his 19th birthday, Berendse began singing during his party. While it started as a joke, he would continue to sing at parties on weekends. He finished his education at Hotelschool The Hague, then took singing lessons, performed at bars and wrote songs to develop his skills as a musician.

In 2015, he participated in the SBS6 talent competition Bloed, zweet & tranen, but was eliminated after one episode. He released two self-financed singles, which were picked up by AVROTROS and helped him sign with the label Dino Music. He released his debut album Het einde van het begin in 2018. Berendse had a stable fanbase with songs such as "Zin in jou" and "Lust", allowing him to sell out at a concert at Amsterdam's AFAS Live in November 2023.

Berendse's song "Terug in de tijd" went viral on TikTok in May 2024. In August, it reached number one on the Dutch Top 40, where it stayed for six weeks. The success of the song led to him playing two shows at the Ziggo Dome in June 2025. His second album Voor altijd was released on 16 May 2025.

Berendse reached the final in the 2025-2026 season of the television show The Masked Singer.

== Discography ==
=== Albums ===
List of studio albums, with selected chart positions
Title	Year	Peak chart positions
Title	Year	NLD
Het einde van het begin	2018	50
Voor altijd	2025	4

=== Singles ===
List of singles or releases, with selected chart positions
Title	Year	Peak chart positions		Album
Title	Year	NLD Top 40	NLD Single Top 100	Album
"Zin in jou"	2016	—	59	Het einde van het begin
"Terug in de tijd"	2024	1	1	Voor altijd
"Alleen met jou" (with Emma Heesters)	2024	11	9	Voor altijd
"Vandaag ben ik van jou"	2025	36	18	Voor altijd
"Hoe zou het zijn geweest"	2025	—	91	Voor altijd
"Nachtenlang" (with Donnie)	2025	11	6	Voor altijd
"Zou niet willen dat ik kerst mis"	2025	28	37	Non-album singles
"Droom jij over mij vannacht"	2026	—	54	Non-album singles
