= Froukje de Both =

Dutch actress and presenter (born 1972)

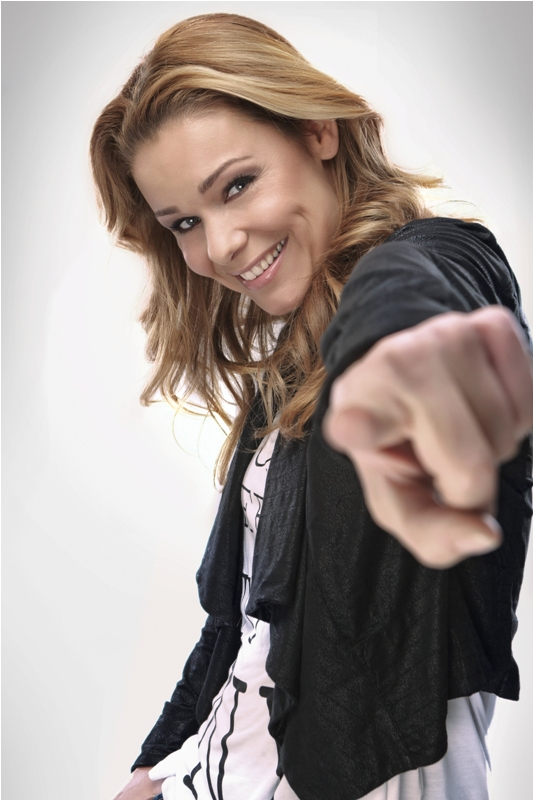
- Born: 20 April 1972 (age 54); Amsterdam, Netherlands
- Occupations: Actress; Radio presenter; Television presenter

Froukje de Both (born 20 April 1972) is a Dutch actress and radio and television presenter.

== Career ==
De Both first became known for playing the role of Mariët Zoomers in Goudkust from 1996 until 2000, and for the role of Agnetha in Costa! from 2001 until 2004. From May of 2002 she hosted the Friday evening show Niels & Froukje on Radio 538. In March 2005 her contract was renewed for three years, the first time a woman disc jockey was given a long-term contract at a commercial station in the Netherlands.

In 2005, De Both presented the short-lived show Thuis for Talpa, and in 2006 she participated in the show Dancing on Ice for RTL 4. She was eliminated in the finale.

In 2007, De Both participated in the show Wie wordt de man van Froukje?, also for RTL 4. In the show she searches for the man of her dreams by dating multiple contestants. The show was hosted by Martijn Krabbé. Ultimately De Both did not form a relationship with the winner of the show, Alexander.

From 2007 to 2008 De Both also hosted the pre and post-game show for Formule 1 coverage on RTL GP, and since 2008 she has co-hosted the show TV Makelaar for RTL 4, where she has remained a frequent presenter and host.

In 2011, De Both appeared in the television game show De Jongens tegen de Meisjes. She also appeared on several occasions in the television game show Ik hou van Holland.

In 2015, De Both was one of the presenters of Wie doet de afwas?, together with Angela Groothuizen and Nance Coolen. The show served as replacement for the soap opera Goede tijden, slechte tijden during its annual break in the summer months. This was also the case for the television show Ik kom bij je eten which she presented from 2009 till 2012.

De Both presented Eigen Huis & Tuin: Lekker leven, a version of Eigen Huis & Tuin with a focus on lifestyle, cooking and living.

De Both appeared in the 23rd season of the television show Wie is de Mol?. She was eliminated in the second episode. She appeared in a 2024 episode of the television show The Masked Singer.

Since September 2025, De Both and Gordon presented the morning radio show Gordon & Froukje. In November 2025, Jan-Paul Grootentraast became presenter of the show. The show ended in July 2026 and Jan-Willem Roodbeen and Jeroen Kijk in de Vegte succeeded De Both and Gordon in September 2026 with a new morning radio show.

== Filmography ==
=== As actress ===
- Goudkust (1996 – 2000)
- Soul Assassin (2001)
- Costa! (2001 – 2004)
- Pista! (2003)
- Missie Warmoesstraat (2004)
- Kung Fu Panda (2008)
- Kung Fu Panda 2 (2011)
- Ice Age: Continental Drift (2012)
- Ice Age: Collision Course (2012)

=== As presenter ===
- Thuis (2005)
- RTL GP: Formule 1 (2007 – 2008)
- Ik kom bij je eten (2009 – 2012)
- Wie doet de afwas? (2015)
- De grote improvisatieshow (2014, 2015)
- Eigen Huis & Tuin: Lekker leven (2020 – 2025)

=== As contestant ===
- 'Wie wordt de man van Froukje? (2007)
- Ik hou van Holland (2009, 2011, 2012, 2014)
- De Jongens tegen de Meisjes (2011, 2014)
- Weet Ik Veel (2013)
- Wie ben ik? (2014)
- Wie is de Mol? (2023)
- The Masked Singer (2024)
