= Kluun =

Dutch author (born 1964)

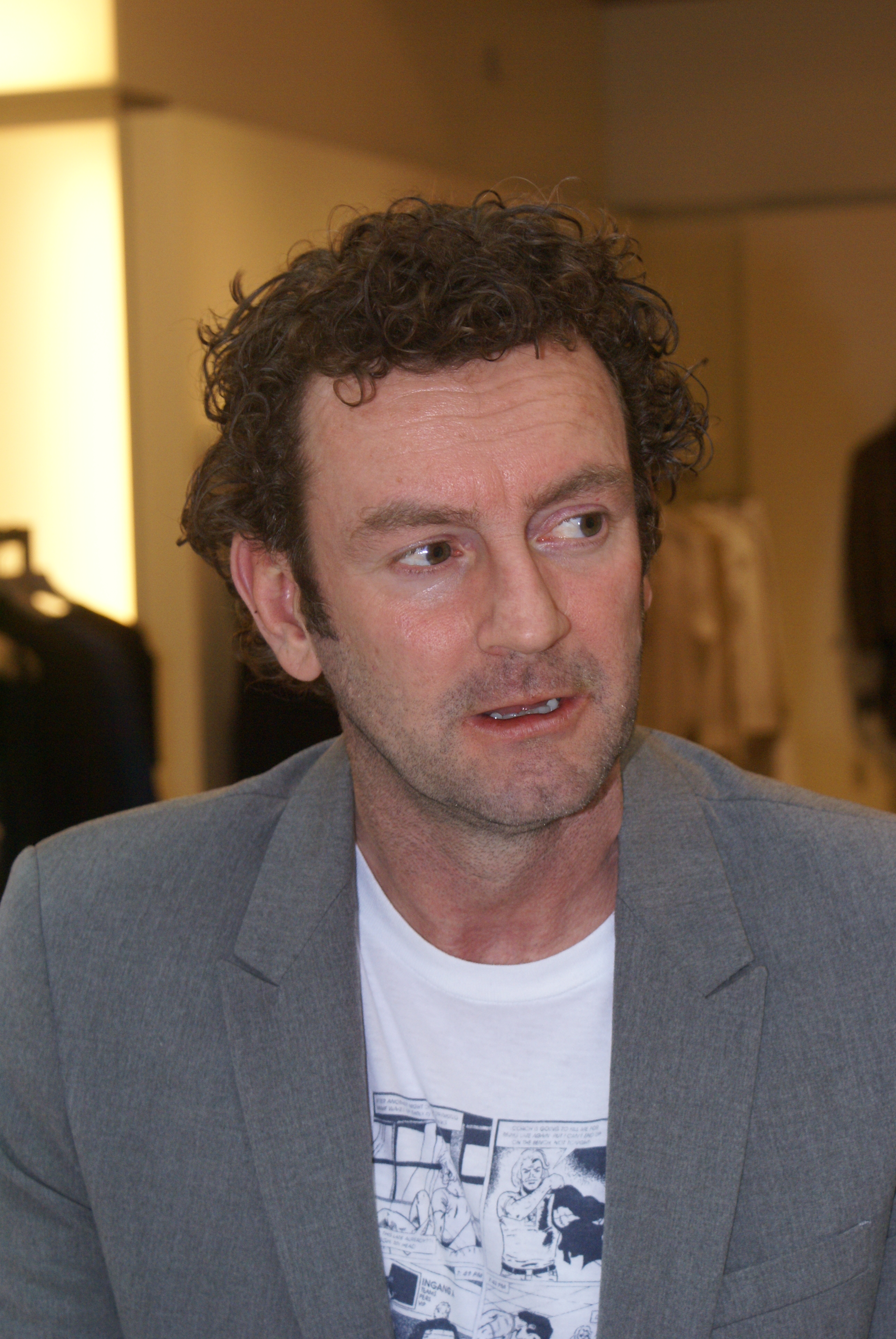
- In 2011
- Born: Raijmondus Godefriedus Norbert van de Klundert; 17 April 1964 (age 62); Tilburg, Netherlands
- Spouse: Judith van de Klundert (?-2001; w.)
- Children: 3
- Writing career
- Pen name: Kluun
- Language: Dutch
- Period: 2003-present
- Subjects: Women, relationships, men
- Notable work: Komt een vrouw bij de dokter (2003)

Raijmondus "Raymond" Godefriedus Norbert van de Klundert (known commonly as Kluun or Ray Kluun, born 17 April 1964) is a Dutch author. He is well known for his novel Love Life (Dutch: Komt een vrouw bij de dokter), in which he documents a fictionalized version of his own life story; a husband committing adultery while his wife is dying of cancer.

== Background ==
Kluun's wife Judith died from breast cancer at 36 years old (2000). He wanted to express his feelings for his late wife, so he used his experience to write his first novel Komt een vrouw bij de dokter (Love Life) 3 years later in 2003. He then wrote the sequel De weduwnaar (The widower) to talk about his move to Australia with their daughter after Judith died.

== Television appearances ==
Kluun appeared in an episode of the 2025 season of the television show The Masked Singer.

== Works ==
- Komt een vrouw bij de dokter (Love Life) (2003)
- Help, ik heb mijn vrouw zwanger gemaakt! (2004)
- De weduwnaar (The widower) (2006)
- Memoires van een marketingsoldaat (2008)
- Klunen (2008)
- Van Leven ga je dood (2008)
- God is gek (2009)
- Haantjes (2011)
- DJ (2017)
- Familieopstelling (2020)
- Help, ik heb een puber! (2022)
