= Tania Kross =

Dutch mezzo-soprano singer

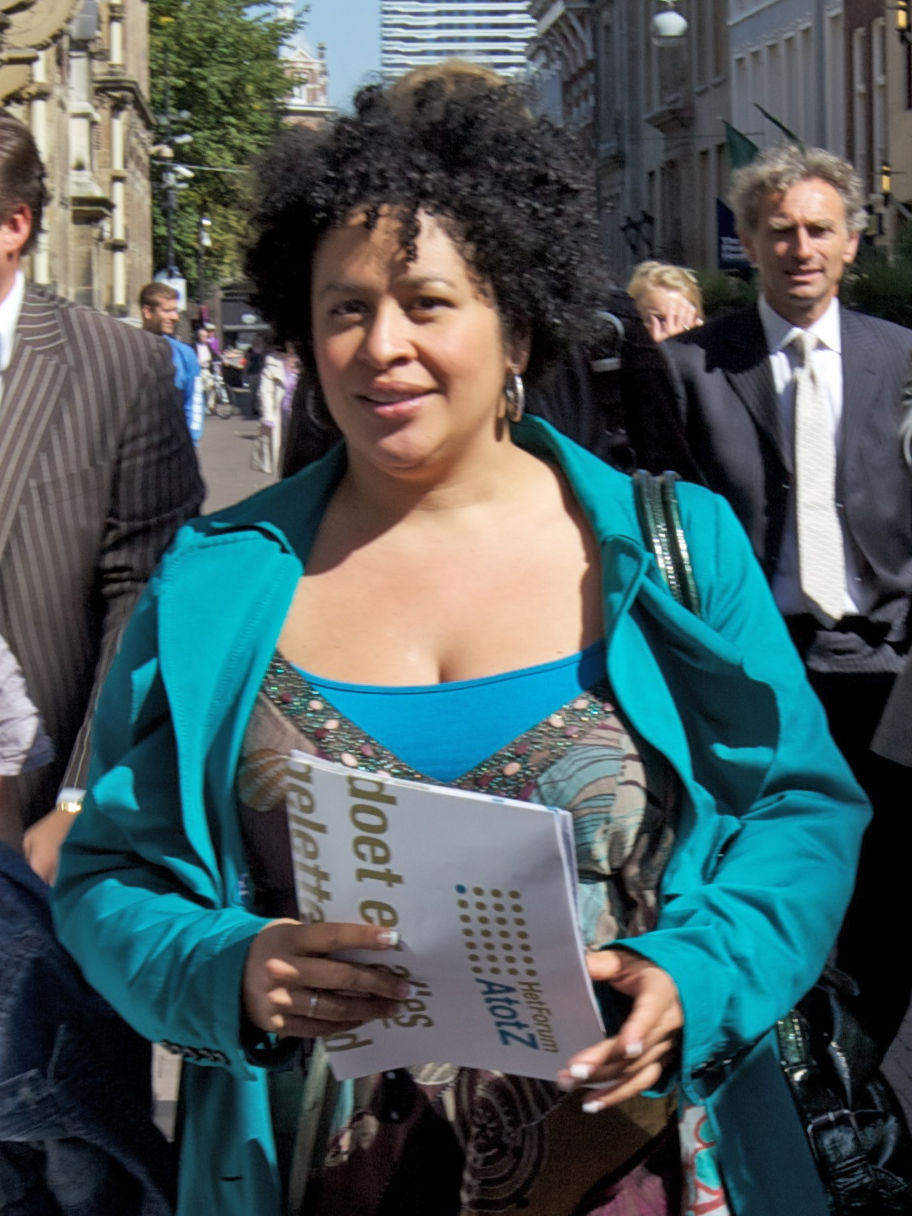
Kross in 2010

Tania Kross is a Dutch mezzo-soprano singer born in Curaçao.

== Early life and education ==
Kross was born in 1976 in Curaçao in the Netherlands Antilles. She trained at the Utrechts Conservatorium and at the International Opera Studio in Amsterdam.

== Career ==
Kross reached the final of the 2003 BBC Cardiff Singer of the World competition.

She took the title role in Carmen at Glyndebourne in 2008. The reviewer in the Financial Times said "The voice is smooth, lyrical and mellow in the lower register but without the snarl or tang the ideal Carmen should muster."

Kross encouraged Carel De Haseth to adapt his novel Katibu di Shon into the first opera in the Papiamento, the language of the ABC islands. She was one of the cast of three who performed the opera at Stadsschouwburg in Amsterdam on 1 July 2013, commemorating the 150th anniversary of the ending of slavery in the Dutch Caribbean.

The Independent's reviewer described her 2014 album Krossover: Opera classics revisited as an "attempt to restore populist appeal to classical music without resorting to another 'opera hits' aria collection".

Kross won the Dutch 2019 edition of The Masked Singer, disguised as a robot.
