= Walid Benmbarek =

Dutch actor (born 1980)

- Born: Walid Benmbarek; 25 January 1980 (age 45); Amsterdam, Netherlands
- Occupation: Actor
- Spouse: Actress Mouna Laroussi

Walid Benmbarek (born 25 January 1980) is a Dutch-Moroccan-French actor. His father is of Moroccan and French descent and his mother is of Moroccan/Tunisian descent . Benmbarek is best known for his role as "Mohammed Aydin" in soap opera Goede tijden, slechte tijden. And as "Adil" in the hitserie Mocro Maffia. Benmbarek has a degree in aerospace engineering.

Benmbarek appeared in the 2023 season of The Masked Singer.

== Acting career ==
- 2019 De Luizenmoeder
- 2018–present Mocro Maffia
- 2017 Brothers
- 2008 Flikken Maastricht
- 2008 Hitte/Harara
- 2006–08 Goede tijden, slechte tijden (Good times, bad times)
- 2007 Dennis P.
- 2006 Kruistocht in spijkerbroek (Crusade in Jeans)
- 2006 Afblijven (XTC Just Don't Do It)
- 2006 Shouf, Shouf
- 2005 Staatsgevaarlijk (Subversive)
- 2004 Bitches
- 2003 Loverboy
