= Son Mieux =

Dutch indie pop group

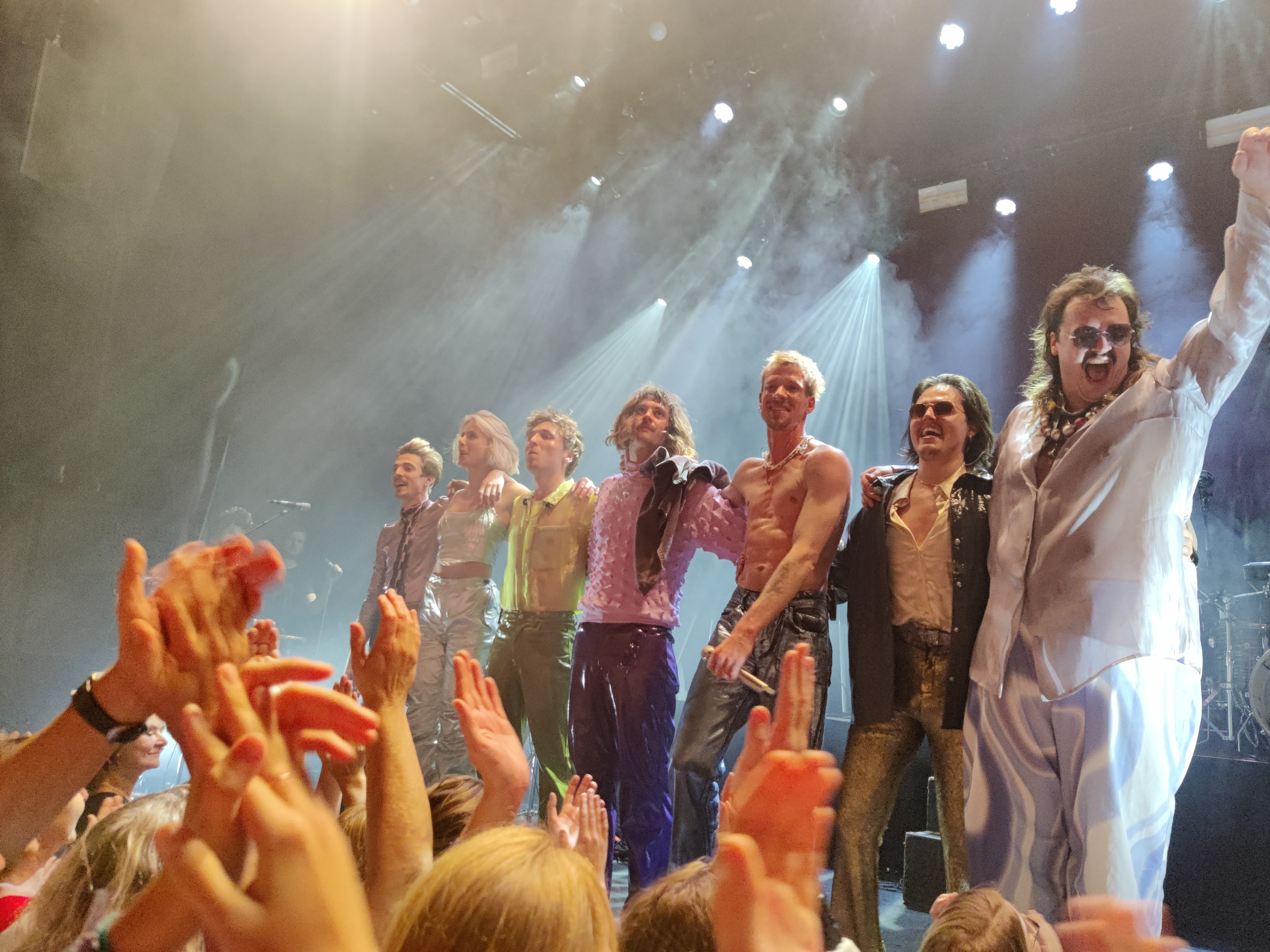
- Son Mieux in 2022

Background information
- Origin: The Hague, the Netherlands
- Genres: Indie pop; indie rock
- Years active: 2015–present
- Label: Universal
- Members: Camiel Meiresonne; Timo Prins; Olivier Lucas; Maud Akkermans; Niels de Maa; Michiel Mutsaerts; Justin Schellekens
- Past members: Wristen Meiresonne; Thijs van Teijlingen; Chayenne van der Kooij; Quinten Meiresonne
- Website: sonmieux.com

Son Mieux is a Dutch indie pop group from The Hague headed by Camiel Meiresonne.

== History ==
Initially, Son Mieux was started as a solo project of Camiel Meiresonne in 2015, who then played keyboard for indie rock band Soul Sister Dance Revolution and sang for garage rock band All Missing Pieces. Initially, he wanted to perform as a singer-songwriter and in that capacity, he recorded the song "Easy". Shortly after, he was invited by the reggae band Splendid to provide support for their upcoming tour. However, during preparations, he decided that he "didn't want to be just another singer-songwriter with a guitar and that [he] wanted to incorporate electronics into [his] music." During Splendid's tour, he started playing together with Timo Prins and Chayenne van der Kooij, which would later be expanded with addition of Wrister Meiresonne, with whom he previously played in All Missing Pieces. In 2015, after their first single "Easy", the band was named 3FM Serious Talent, and on 15 October that year, they made their television debut at De Wereld Draait Door.

Wrister left the band in 2018 and was succeeded by Thijs van Teijlingen. The formation was then expanded with the addition of Maud Akkermans and multi-instrumentalist Quinten Meiresonne, who played bass for bands such as The Consolers, All Missing Pieces, and Taymir. With this line-up, work continued on the debut album, which was released on 8 February 2019, under the title Faire de Son Mieux. The presentation of this album took place on the release date in a sold-out Paard van Troje in The Hague. The album entered the Album Top 100 after one week at position 16.

At the beginning of 2021, their latest hit "1992" became TopSong on NPO Radio 2 in week 3, and in week 5 Megahit on NPO 3FM. On 27 April 2021 the band released the single "Drive". In week 20, "Drive" also became Megahit on NPO 3FM. On 28 July 2021 the band released the follow-up to "Drive", titled "Can't Get Enough". This single was voted NPO Radio 2 TopSong in week 31. During this period, the band was also the resident band for Studio Tokio, the NOS evening program on NPO 1 around the Olympic Games, for six days. Every day Son Mieux played songs that were interspersed live with the highlights of the Olympic day.

The summer of 2022 marked the final breakthrough to an audience of millions with the single "Multicolor". It became their first Top 40 hit and also a top-five hit. "Multicolor" was the most played record on Dutch radio for weeks and was number 1 in the Mega Top 30. It was placed 179th on the 2022 edition of the Top 2000.

== Line-up ==
=== Current line-up ===
- Camiel Meiresonne (lead vocals, guitar, percussion)
- Timo Prins (bass guitar, synthesizer, vocals)
- Olivier Lucas (drums, percussion, vocals)
- Maud Akkermans (violin, trumpet, percussion, vocals)
- Niels de Maa (guitar, vocals)
- Michiel Mutsaerts (keyboard, vocals)
- Justin Schellekens (saxophone, percussion, vocals)

=== Former members ===
- Wrister Meiresonne (percussion, vocals)
- Thijs van Teijlingen (drums, percussion, vocals)
- Chayenne van der Kooij (drums, percussion, vocals)
- Quinten Meiresonne (keys, guitar, vocals)

== Discography ==
=== Albums ===
- Faire de Son Mieux (2015)
- The Mustard Seed (2021)
- 24 Hours (2026)

=== Extended plays ===
- Vice Versa (2016)

=== Singles ===
- "Easy" (2015)
- "Even" (2016)
- "Ride" (2016)
- "Hiding" (2017)
- "Everyday" (2018)
- "Old Love" (2018)
- "Leads" (2019)
- "Nothing" (2019)
- "Luxury of Quarantine" (2020)
- "1992" (2021)
- "Will" (2021)
- "Drive" (2021)
- "Can't Get Enough" (2021)
- "Dancing at the Doors of Heaven" (2021)
- "Multicolor" (2022)
- "This Is the Moment" (2022)
- "Tell Me More" (2023)
- "Tonight" (2023)
- "This Is the Moment" featuring Nile Rodgers (2024)
- "Free for Another Day" (2024)
- "Have a Little Faith" (2025)
- "It's Only Love" (2025)
- "Morning" (2025)
- "Dark Before the Dawn" (2026)
- "Feels, Pt. 2" (2026)

== Awards ==
- 2022 Edison Award in the category 'rock' for their album The Mustard Seed.
