= Najib Amhali =

Dutch stand-up comedian and actor

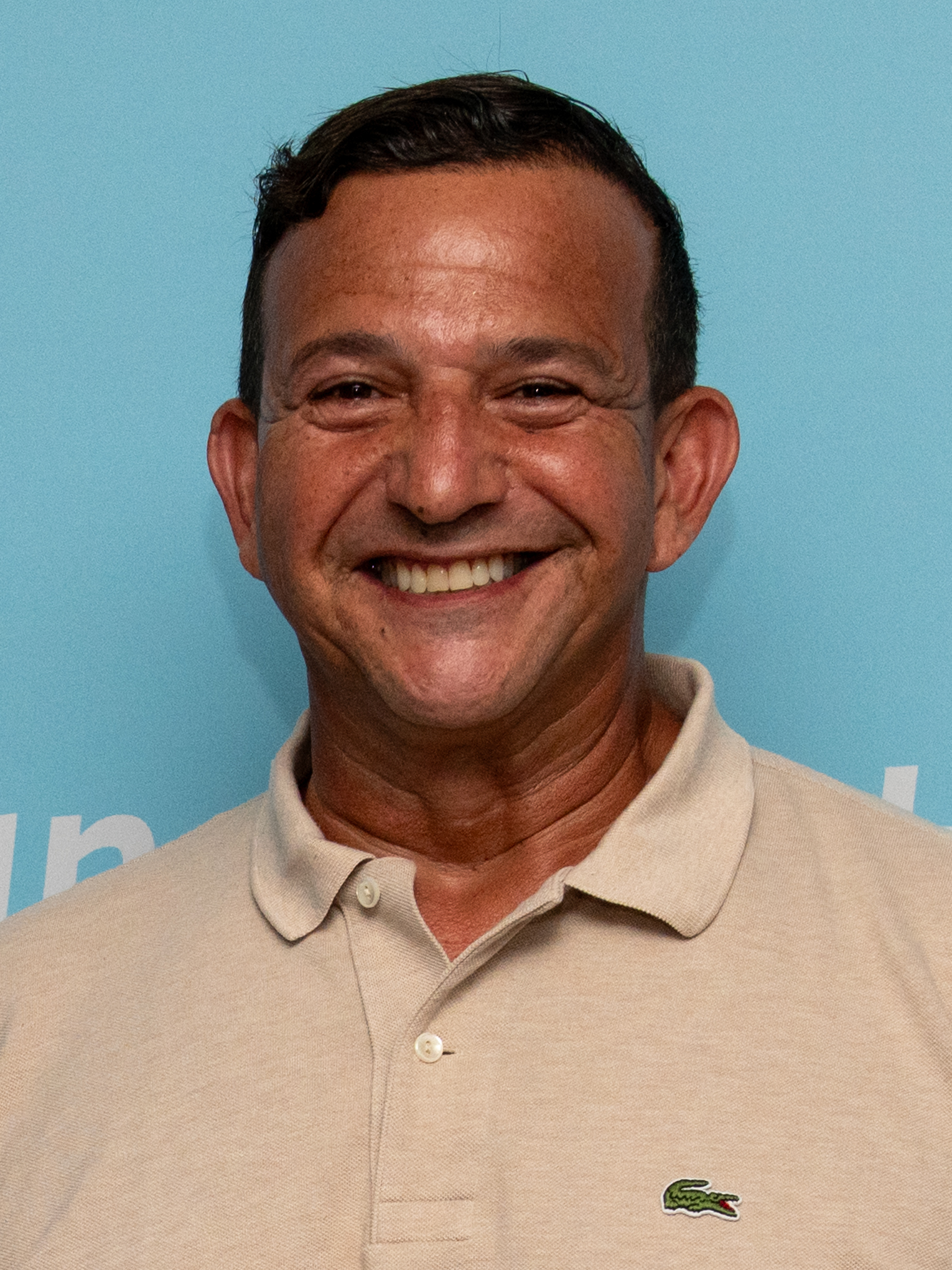
- Amhali in 2023
- Born: April 4, 1971 (age 55); Nador, Morocco
- Notable work: Vol Is Vol, Veni Vidi Vici, Most Wanted, Zorg Dat Je Erbij Komt, Alles Komt Goed

Comedy career
- Years active: 1989–present
- Medium: Stand-up, television, film
- Genre: Stand-up Comedy

Najib Amhali (Riffian-Berber: ⵏⴰⵊⵉⴱ ⴰⵎⵀⴰⵍⵉ; born April 4, 1971) is a Moroccan-born Dutch stand-up comedian and actor.

== Life ==
Najib Amhali (born Najim Amhali) was born in Nador.

He has appeared as an actor in several Dutch productions. In 1999 he starred with Hans Teeuwen and Kim van Kooten in the movie Jezus is een Palestijn ('Jesus is a Palestinian'). In 2002 he appeared in the series Najib en Julia ('Najib and Juliet'), directed by filmmaker Theo van Gogh. In 2004 Amhali appeared in the film Shouf Shouf Habibi.

Amhali is also a professional drummer, and sometimes combines his music and his stand-up comedy.

In May 2006 Amhali hosted a show about the 2006 FIFA World Cup in which he discussed all aspects of the Dutch team and collected money for charity.
