= Dionne Stax =

Dutch journalist and newsreader

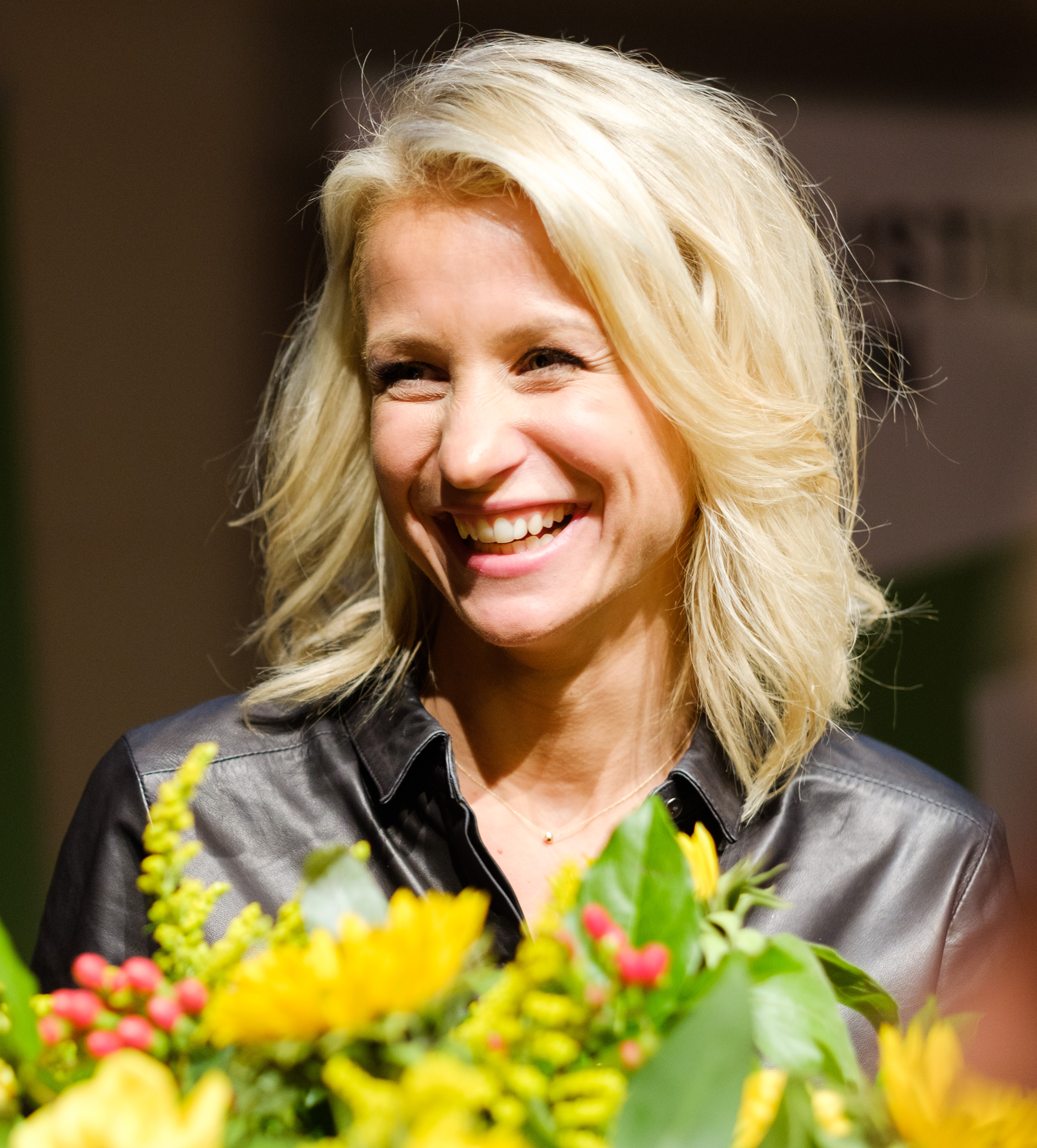
- Dionne Stax at the Festival van de Journalistiek (Journalism Festival), 2017
- Born: 22 April 1985 (age 41); Boxmeer, Netherlands
- Occupations: Journalist; newsreader
- Years active: 2007–present
- Notable credits: NOS Journaal; NOS op 3

Dionne Stax (born 22 April 1985) is a Dutch journalist and newsreader.

== Biography ==
She attended elzendaal college boxmeer and studied communication sciences, with her bachelor's degree at Tilburg University and master's degree at the University of Amsterdam.

Stax started in 2007 at NOS Headlines, the predecessor of NOS op 3, as a trainee. There she gave weekly reviews of NOS Headlines for the digital theme channel NOS Journaal 24. After completing a second internship at the inland editors, Stax graduated from the University of Amsterdam in 2009.

In February 2012, Stax became one of the presenters of the news bulletin NOS op 3 on television. In addition to presenting, Stax works as an in-house editor at NOS News. In June 2013 she became one of the fixed faces of the morning and daytime broadcasts of the NOS Journaal; since May 2015, Stax has also presented the evening bulletins. On 5 December 2015 she presented her first 8pm news.

Stax was on air during the Paris attacks in January 2015, breaking the news of both the Charlie Hebdo shooting and the hostage-taking at a Jewish supermarket two days later. From 2015, Stax presented the election results as the successor to Herman van der Zandt.

On 27 April 2016, Koningsdag, in Zwolle, Stax was the first journalist to interview the Dutch princesses Amalia, Alexia and Ariane, after asking their parents some questions in the same interview. In 2017, she presented a programme at Omroep MAX and made the documentary series Lady Di & Dionne for NTR about the life of Lady Diana. In 2016, she wore a shirt with Palestinian black and white kufiyyeh in a gesture against Israeli human rights violations.

She appeared in a 2023 episode of the television series The Masked Singer.
