= Bianca Krijgsman =

Dutch actress (born 1968)

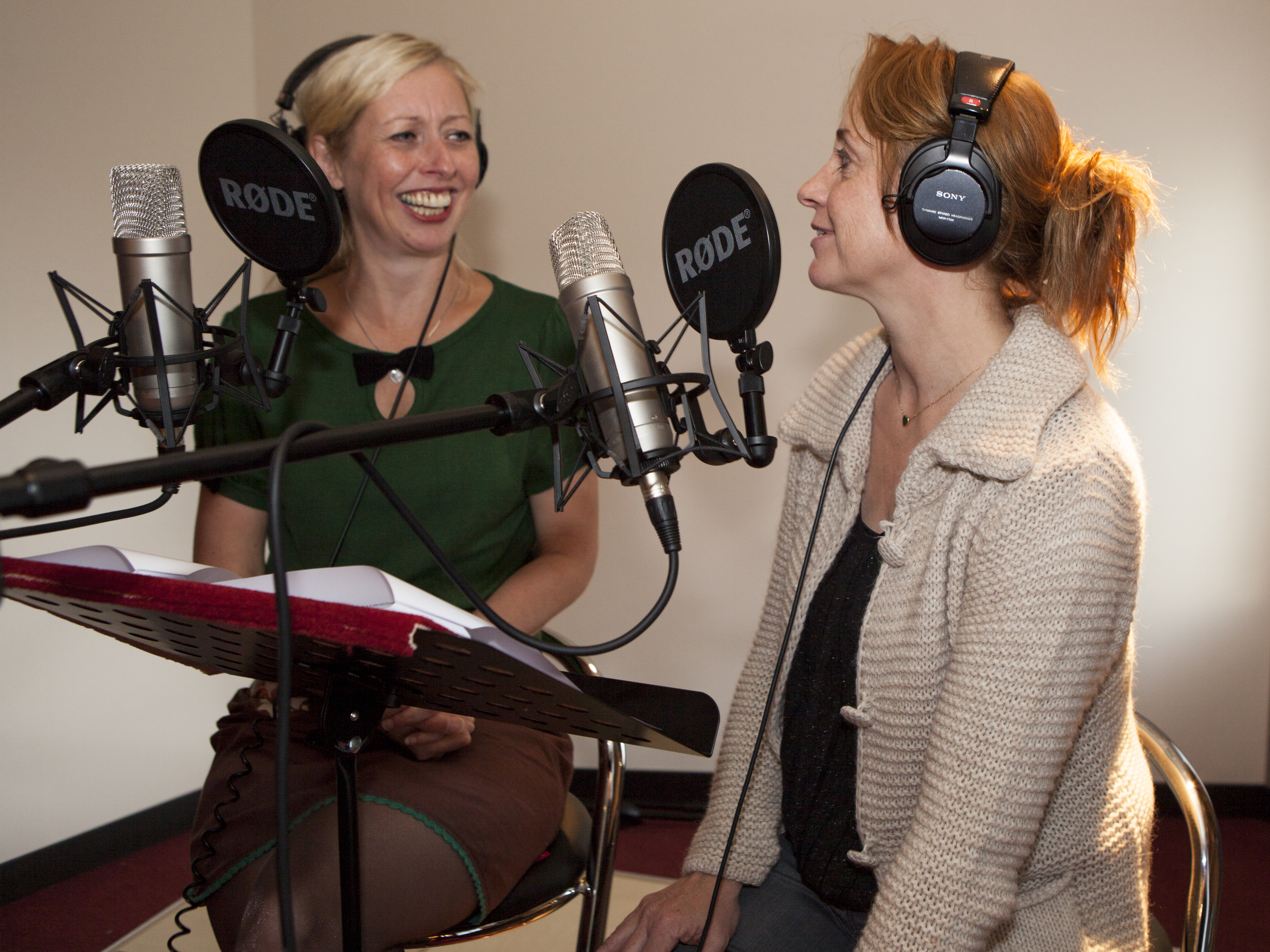
- Plien van Bennekom and Bianca Krijgsman
- Born: 3 October 1968 (age 57); Oudesluis, North Holland, Netherlands
- Occupations: Comedian, actress

Bianca Krijgsman (born 3 October 1968) is a Dutch comedian and actress. She won the prize for best actress at the 42nd International Emmy for her role in the television film De Nieuwe Wereld.
