= Marco Borsato discography =

- Studio albums: 13
- Live albums: 3
- Compilation albums: 5
- Singles: 43
- Video albums: 8
- Box sets: 2

The discography of Dutch singer Marco Borsato consists of thirteen studio albums, three live albums, five compilation albums, two box sets, eight video albums and 43 singles.

== Albums ==
=== Studio albums ===
Title	Album details	Peak chart positions		Certifications
Title	Album details	NL	BEL (FLA)	Certifications
Emozioni	Released: 3 March 1990; Label: Polydor Records	78	—	
Sento	Released: 17 December 1991; Label: Polydor Records	—	—	
Giorno per giorno	Released: 27 October 1992; Label: Polydor Records	—	—	
Marco	Released: 17 September 1994; Label: Polydor Records	2	7	NVPI: 2× Platinum
Als geen ander	Released: 4 October 1995; Label: Polydor Records	1	9	BEA: Platinum; NVPI: 4× Platinum
De waarheid	Released: 15 January 1997; Label: Polydor Records	1	1	NVPI: 6× Platinum
De bestemming	Released: 20 August 1998; Label: Polydor Records	1	1	NVPI: 5× Platinum
Luid en duidelijk	Released: 8 January 2000; Label: Polydor Records	1	1	BEA: Gold; NVPI: 4× Platinum
Wit licht	Released: 19 September 2008; Label: Universal Music	1	1	BEA: Platinum; NVPI: 3× Platinum
Dromen durven delen	Released: 19 November 2010; Label: Universal Music	1	1	BEA: 2× Platinum; NVPI: 4× Platinum
Duizend spiegels	Released: 22 November 2013; Label: Universal Music	1	2	BEA: Platinum; NVPI: 2× Platinum
Evenwicht	Released: 20 November 2015; Label: Universal Music	2	2	BEA: Gold; NVPI: 3× Platinum
Thuis	Released: 17 November 2017; Label: Universal Music	1	2	
"—" denotes items which were not released in that country or failed to chart.

=== Live albums ===
Title	Album details	Peak chart positions		Certifications
Title	Album details	NL	BEL (FLA)	Certifications
Symphonica in Rosso	Released: 1 December 2006; Label: Universal Music	1	1	BEA: Platinum; NVPI: 2× Platinum (cd/dvd); NVPI: 2× Platinum (dvd)
Wit licht live	Released: 13 March 2009; Label: Universal Music	1	3	
3Dimensies live	Released: 21 October 2011; Label: Universal Music	2	14	NVPI: Platinum (cd/dvd)

=== Compilation albums ===
Title	Album details	Peak chart positions		Certifications
Title	Album details	NL	BEL (FLA)	Certifications
Mijn mooiste nummers	Released: 1996; Label: Polydor Records	—	—	
Italian Collection	Released: 1999; Label: Polydor Records	—	—	
Z'n mooiste Italiaanse liedjes	Released: 1999; Label: Polydor Records	—	—	
Onderweg	Released: 25 March 2001; Label: Polydor Records	1	1	BEA: 5× Platinum; NVPI: Platinum (dvd)
#1	Released: 25 November 2011; Label: Universal Music	2	2	BEA: Gold; NVPI: Platinum
"—" denotes items which were not released in that country or failed to chart.

=== Box sets ===
Title	Album details	Peak chart positions	
Title	Album details	NL	BEL (FLA)
Borsato-Box (Note: The Borsato Box consists of six CDs: the first four CDs contain Borsato's greatest hits from the period 1990−2006; the fifth CD contains unique recordings that hadn't been released before; and the sixth and last CD is a CD-version of the 2004 video album Zien.)	Released: 2 November 2007; Label: Polydor Records	7	20
25 jaar Marco Borsato - De studio albums (Note: This box set contains all eleven studio albums by Borsato released in the previous 25 years, in addition to a CD-version of the 2004 video album Zien.)	Released: 24 July 2015; Label: Universal Music	2	10

=== Video albums ===
Title	Album details	Certifications
Onderweg - Clips	Released: 1 March 2002; Label: Polydor Records	
Onderweg - Live in de Kuip	Released: 4 November 2002; Label: Polydor Records	BEA: Gold
Zien (Note: This video album has also been made available in CD. This version of Zien is included in the box sets Borsato Box and 25 jaar Marco Borsato - De studio albums.)	Released: 18 March 2004; Label: Universal Music	NVPI: 4× Platinum (cd/dvd)
Zien - Live in de Kuip	Released: 15 October 2004; Label: Universal Music	BEA: Platinum
Zien - Live in het Sportpaleis	Released: 15 October 2004; Label: Universal Music	
Symphonica in Rosso	Released: 1 December 2006; Label: Universal Music	BEA: Platinum
Wit licht live	Released: 13 March 2009; Label: Universal Music	
Dromen durven delen: 3Dimensies live	Released: 4 September 2011; Label: Universal Music	

== Singles ==
=== As lead artist ===
Title	Year	Peak chart positions			Certifications	Album
Title	Year	NL Top 40	NL Top 100	BEL (FLA)	Certifications	Album
"Emozioni" / "At This Moment"	1990	4	4	—		Emozioni
"Una donna così"	1990	29	27	—		Emozioni
"You're the Reason Why"	1990	—	—	—		Emozioni
"Sento"	1991	— (Note: "Sento" did not enter the Dutch Top 40, but peaked at number three on the Tipparade chart, which acts as an extension to the Top 40.)	50	—		Sento
"Un po' bambino"	1992	37	32	—		Sento
"Dromen zijn bedrog"	1994	1	1	1	NVPI: 3× Platinum	Marco
"Waarom nou jij"	1994	1	1	4	NVPI: Platinum	Marco
"Je hoeft niet naar huis vannacht"	1995	9	7	19		Als geen ander
"Kom maar bij mij"	1995	20	12	48		Als geen ander
"Ik leef niet meer voor jou"	1996	8	9	17		Als geen ander
"Vrij zijn" / "Margherita"	1996	3	5	—		Als geen ander
"De waarheid"	1996	2	2	29		De waarheid
"Wie"	1997	—	—	36		De waarheid
"Je zit op rozen"	1997	—	—	— (Note: "Je zit op rozen" did not enter the Ultratop 50, but peaked at number 17 on the Ultratip chart, which acts as an extension to the Ultratop 50.)		De waarheid
"Wereld zonder jou" (featuring Trijntje Oosterhuis)	1997	3	3	— (Note: "Wereld zonder jou" did not enter the Ultratop 50, but peaked at number 17 on the Ultratip chart, which acts as an extension to the Ultratop 50.)		De waarheid
"De bestemming"	1998	1	1	12	NVPI: Platinum	De bestemming
"Het water" / "Speeltuin"	1998	10	12	— (Note: "Het water" / "Speeltuin" did not enter the Ultratop 50, but peaked at number 15 on the Ultratip chart, which acts as an extension to the Ultratop 50.)		De bestemming
"Binnen"	1999	1	1	38	NVPI: Gold	Luid en duidelijk
"Wat is mijn hart"	2000	16	14	—		Luid en duidelijk
"Lopen op het water" (featuring Sita)	2001	1	1	1	BEA: Gold	Onderweg
"Zij"	2002	11	8	12		Onderweg
"Hart van een winnaar"	2002	—	—	28		Onderweg
"Afscheid nemen bestaat niet"	2003	1	1	1	BEA: Gold	Zien
"Voorbij" (featuring Do)	2004	1	1	2		Zien
"Wat zou je doen?" (featuring Ali B)	2004	1	1	—		Zien: Live in de Kuip
"Laat me gaan"	2004	—	—	29		Zien
"Because We Believe" (with Andrea Bocelli)	2006	1	1	4		Symphonica in Rosso
"Rood"	2006	1	1	1	BEA: Platinum; NVPI: Platinum	Symphonica in Rosso
"Everytime I Think of You" (with Lucie Silvas)	2006	1	1	5		Symphonica in Rosso
"Wit licht"	2008	1	1	3		Wit licht
"Stop de tijd"	2008	1	1	3		Wit licht
"Dochters"	2008	1	1	23		Wit licht
"Schouder aan schouder" (with Guus Meeuwis)	2010	2	1	— (Note: "Schouder aan schouder" did not enter the Ultratop 50, but peaked at number 15 on the Ultratip chart, which acts as an extension to the Ultratop 50.)		Dromen durven delen
"Waterkant"	2010	9	1	50		Dromen durven delen
"Kerstmis"	2010	11	3	— (Note: "Kerstmis" did not enter the Ultratop 50, but peaked at number 24 on the Ultratip chart, which acts as an extension to the Ultratop 50.)		Dromen durven delen
"Dichtbij"	2011	29	—	— (Note: "Dichtbij" did not enter the Ultratop 50, but peaked at number 18 on the Ultratip chart, which acts as an extension to the Ultratop 50.)		Dromen durven delen
"Kom maar op (Vrij)" (featuring Lange Frans)	2011	29	6	—		Dromen durven delen
"Droom, durf, doe en deel"	2011	—	—	—		Dromen durven delen
"Muziek" (featuring Ali B & Bag2Bank)	2013	9	1	— (Note: "Muziek" did not enter the Ultratop 50, but peaked at number 8 on the Ultratip chart, which acts as an extension to the Ultratop 50.)		Duizend spiegels
"Ik zou het zo weer overdoen" (featuring Trijntje Oosterhuis)	2013	3	1	30		Duizend spiegels
"Samen voor altijd" (with Jada Borsato featuring Willem Frederiks & Lange Frans and Jay Ewbank & John Ewbank)	2013	12	1	1	BEA: Gold	Duizend spiegels
"Het beste wat ik ooit had"	2014	—	—	— (Note: "Het beste wat ik ooit had" did not enter the Ultratop 50, but peaked at number 13 on the Ultratip chart, which acts as an extension to the Ultratop 50.)		Duizend spiegels
"Mooi"	2015	14	6	46		Evenwicht
"Tweede kans"	2015	—	56	—		Evenwicht
"Waarom dans je niet met mij"	2015	—	76	—		Evenwicht
"Kleine oneindigheid"	2015	—	55	—		Evenwicht
"Neem me mee" (with Sanne Hans)	2015	—	56	—		Evenwicht
"Breng me naar het water" (with Matt Simons)	2016	21	22	—		Evenwicht
"Thuis"	2017	27	66	— (Note: "Thuis" did not enter the Ultratop 50, but peaked at number 11 on the Ultratip chart, which acts as an extension to the Ultratop 50.)		Thuis
"Wat doe je met me"	2018	—	—	— (Note: "Wat doe je met me" did not enter the Ultratop 50, but peaked at number 14 on the Ultratip chart, which acts as an extension to the Ultratop 50.)		Thuis
"Hoe het danst" (with Armin van Buuren and Davina Michelle)	2019	1	2	1	BEA: 2× Platinum	Non-album singles
"Lippenstift" (with Snelle and John Ewbank)	2019	2	2	15		Non-album singles
"Een moment" (with Rolf Sanchez and John Ewbank)	2021	26	12	33		Non-album singles
"Hef je glas" (with Rolf Sanchez and John Ewbank)	2021	24	32	21		Non-album singles
"—" denotes items which were not released in that country or failed to chart.

=== Featured singles ===
Title	Year	Peak chart positions			Certifications
Title	Year	NL Top 40	NL Top 100	BEL (FLA)	Certifications
"You've Got a Friend" (René Froger featuring Ruth Jacott and Marco Borsato)	1995	3	3	—	
"—" denotes items which were not released in that country or failed to chart.

=== Other appearances ===
Title	Year	Peak chart positions		
Title	Year	NL Top 40	NL Top 100	BEL (FLA)
"Samen leven" (charity single by supergroep Artiesten voor Droezba)	1990	—	62	—
"Als je iets kan doen" (charity single by supergroup Artiesten voor Azië)	2005	1	1	—
"One Thousand Voices" (song by the coaches of The Voice of Holland)	2011	1	1	—
"Koningslied" (song by various Dutch artists for the investiture of Willem-Alexander)	2013	2	1	41
"—" denotes items which were not released in that country or failed to chart.

== Other charted songs ==
Title	Year	Peak chart positions	Album
Title	Year	NL Top 100	Album
"Breng me naar het water"	2015	75	Evenwicht
"Hoeveel ik van je hou"	2015	79	Evenwicht
"Hou me vast"	2015	81	Evenwicht
"Om je heen"	2015	99	Evenwicht
"Alsof je vliegt"	2017	99	Thuis
