= The Voice Kids (Dutch TV series) season 11 =

Season of television series

The Voice Kids
- Season 11
- Hosted by: Jamai Loman; Quinty Misiedjan
- Coaches: Claude; Ilse DeLange; Flemming; Emma Heesters

Release
- Original network: RTL 4
- Original release: 13 November 2026 – present

The eleventh season of the talent show The Voice Kids premiered on 13 November 2026 on RTL 4, five years after being placed on hiatus. Ilse DeLange returned as a coach and joined by three debutants; Claude, Flemming and Emma Heesters. Jamai Loman returned to present the show, he was joined by Quinty Misiedjan.

== Coaches and host ==
The Voice Kids Holland season 11 coaches and hosts

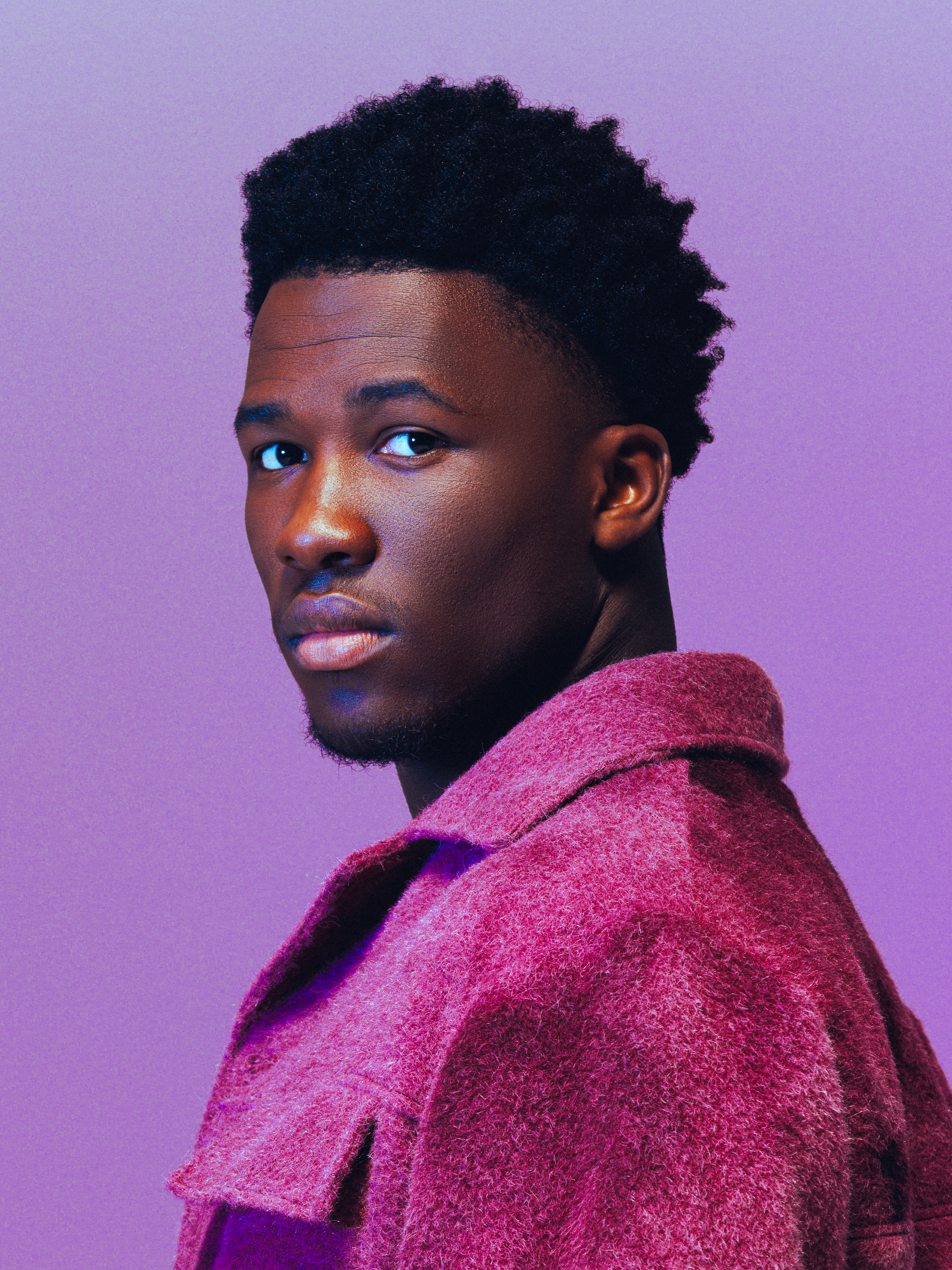
Claude

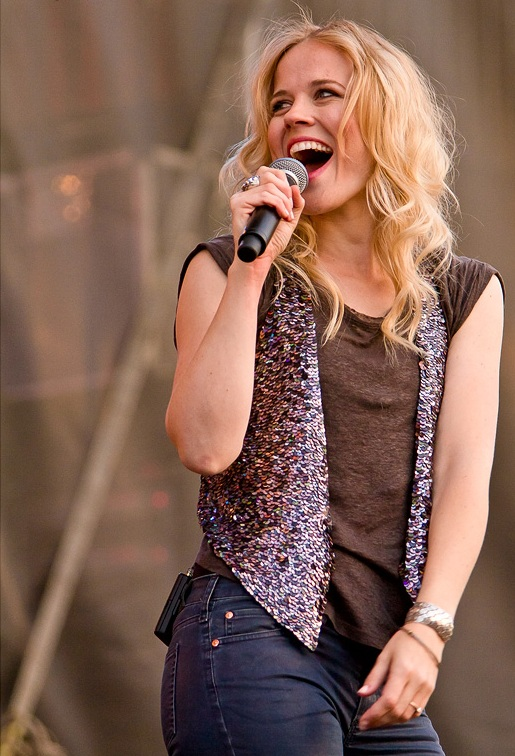
Ilse DeLange

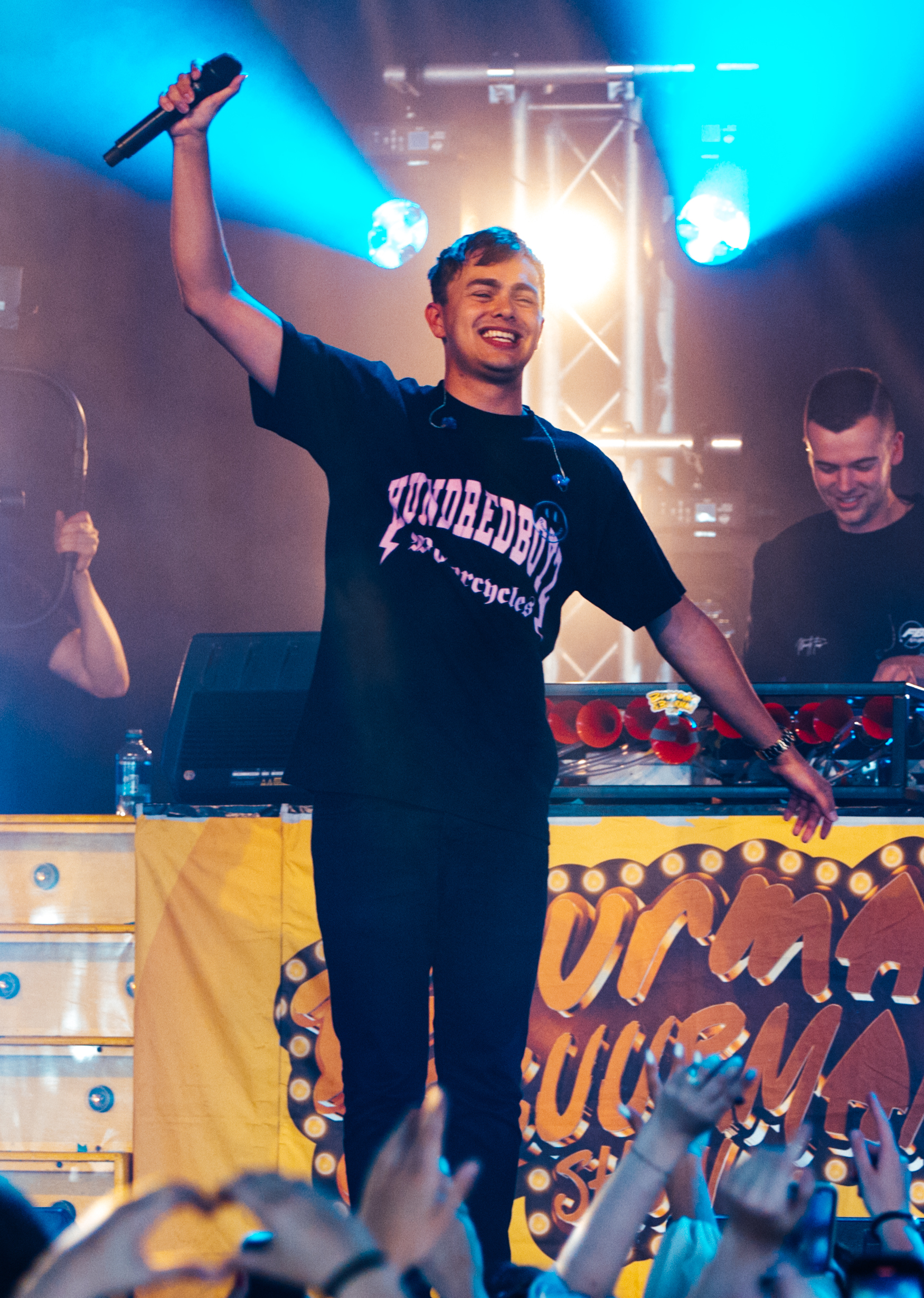
Flemming

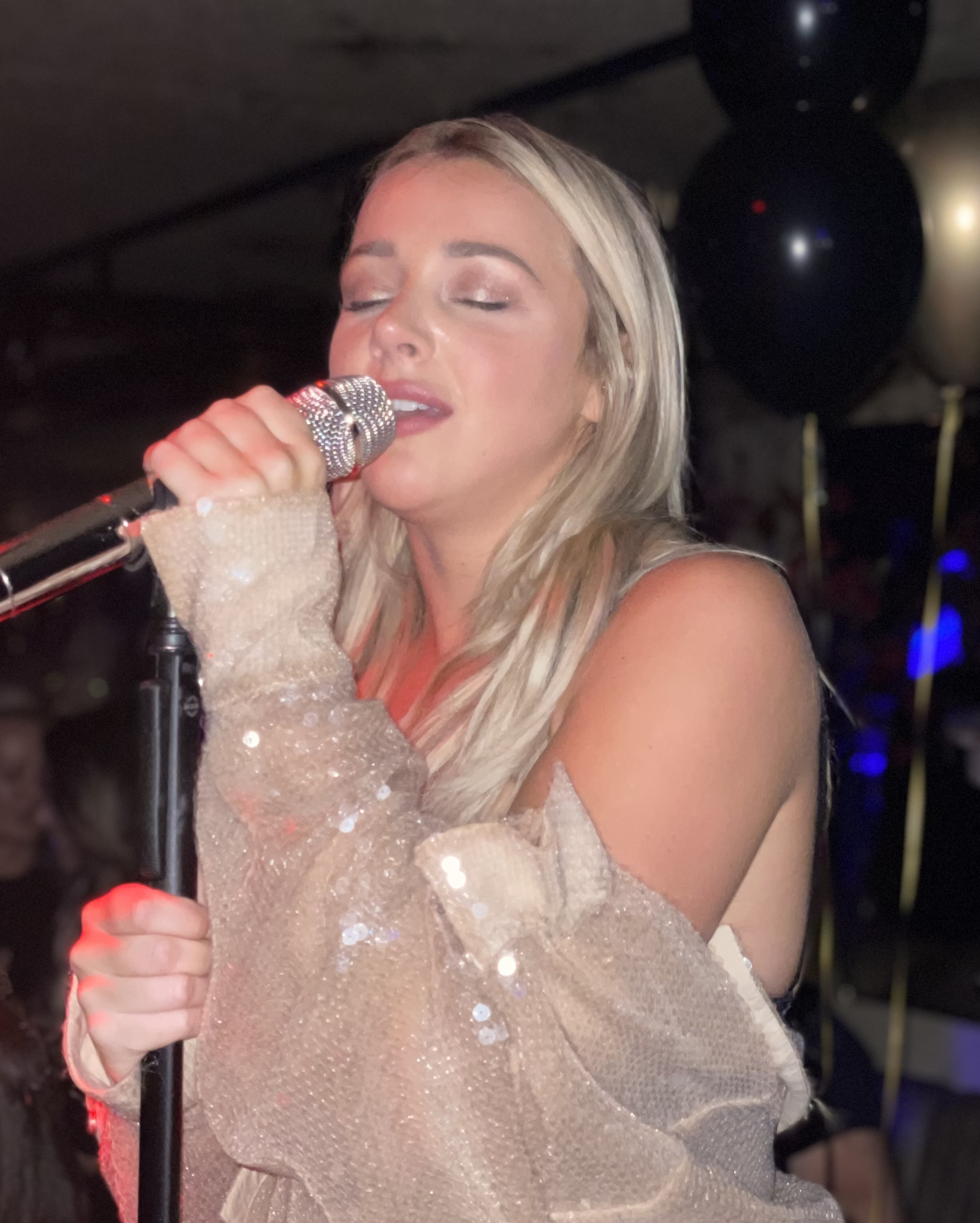
Emma Heesters

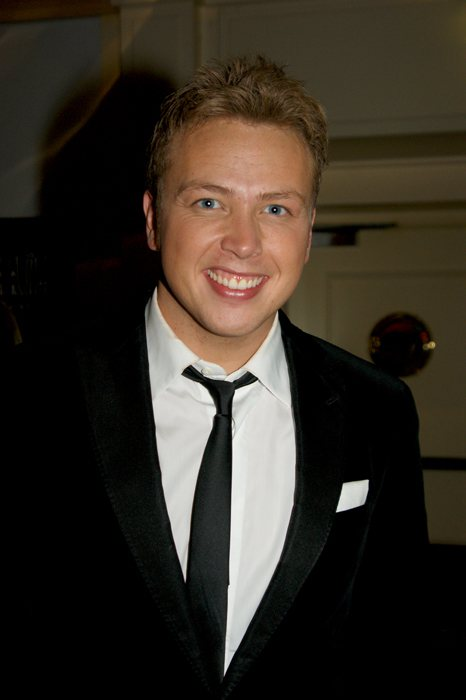
Jamai Loman

Quinty Misiedjan

On 31 March 2025, it was announced that Ilse DeLange would return to the show for her sixth season as a main coach. She was joined by Flemming, Emma Heesters, and Claude, the latter of whom participated in the show's eighth season.

This season was presented by Jamai Loman, who returns for his third conseuctive season, with Quinty Misiedjan joining him as the shows newest presenter.

== Teams ==
Teams color key
Winner
Runner-up
Eliminated in the Semifinals
Eliminated in the Sing-offs
Eliminated in the Battles

Coaches	Top 48 Artists			
Claude				
Claude	Natalya	Julian	Adil	Lizzie
Claude	Noah			
Ilse DeLange				
Ilse DeLange	Ceyda	Shanaya		
Flemming				
Flemming	Dovydas	Fay	Lotus	Niek
Flemming	Joy			
Emma Heesters				
Emma Heesters	Janessy	Elina	Mila	

== Blind Auditions ==
The blind auditions premiered on 13 November 2026. In this round, an artist performs a song on the stage while the four coaches are turned away from him/her. If the coach wants to work with the artist, they press their "I WANT YOU" button which turns their chair to face the artist. If more than one coach turns for the artist, it is up to the artist to choose his/her coach, effectively joining that team. Each coach has 12 spots per team.

Color Key
✔	Coach pressed "I WANT YOU" button
	Artist defaulted to a coach's team
	Artist elected a coach's team
	Artist was eliminated

=== Episode 1 (13 November) ===
Order	Artist	Age	Song	Coaches' and contestants' choices			
Order	Artist	Age	Song	Claude	Ilse	Flemming	Emma
1	Janessy	15	"Bang Bang"	✔	✔	✔	✔
2	Dovydas	11	"L-O-V-E"	✔	✔	✔	—
3	Fay	11	"Alles Wordt Beter"	—	✔	✔	—
4	Che	15	"No Surrender"	—	—	—	—
5	Natalya	12	"Perfect Symphony"	✔	✔	✔	✔
6	Lotus	10	"Waterdicht"	✔	—	✔	—
7	Keano	13	"Unwritten"	—	—	—	—
8	Ceyda	13	"If the World Was Ending"	—	✔	—	✔
9	Shanaya	13	"Voilà"	✔	✔	✔	✔

=== Episode 2 (20 November) ===
Order	Artist	Age	Song	Coaches' and contestants' choices			
Order	Artist	Age	Song	Claude	Ilse	Flemming	Emma
1	Elina	15	"Vampire"	✔	—	✔	✔
2	Julian	8	"Ik hou van jou"	✔	✔	✔	✔
3	Rosa	9	"Honderd Keer"	—	—	—	—
4	Adil	15	"Ladada (Mon dernier mot)"	✔	✔	—	—
5	Niek	14	"Grenade"	✔	—	✔	✔
6	Joy	11	"Echte liefde is te koop"	✔	—	✔	✔
7	Mees	14	"Kleur"	—	—	—	—
8	Mila	13	"Fighter"	✔	✔	✔	✔
9	Lizzie	13	"Ex's & Oh's"	✔	—	✔	—
10	Noah	12	"The Code"	✔	✔	✔	✔

=== Episode 2 (27 November) ===
Order	Artist	Age	Song	Coaches' and contestants' choices			
Order	Artist	Age	Song	Claude	Ilse	Flemming	Emma
1							
2							
3							
4							
5							
6							
7							
8							
9							
10							
