= The Voice Kids (Dutch TV series) =

- Genre: Reality television
- Created by: John de Mol Jr.
- Developed by: Talpa Content
- Presented by: Martijn Krabbé; Wendy van Dijk; Jamai Loman; Quinty Misiedjan
- Judges: Marco Borsato; Angela Groothuizen; Nick & Simon; Ali B; Ilse Delange; Douwe Bob; Anouk; Sanne Hans; Snelle; Claude; Flemming; Emma Heesters
- Voices of: Martijn Krabbé
- Country of origin: Netherlands
- Original language: Dutch
- No. of seasons: 11
- No. of episodes: 96

Production
- Producer: Talpa Productions
- Production locations: Studio 1, Aalsmeer (seasons 1); Studio 24, Hilversum (seasons 2–10)
- Running time: 120 minutes (inc. adverts)

Original release
- Network: RTL 4
- Release: 27 January 2012 – 4 June 2021

Related
- The Voice of Holland; The Voice Senior

The Voice Kids is a Dutch talent show produced by Talpa and broadcast on RTL 4 since January 27, 2012. It was hosted by Martijn Krabbé and Wendy van Dijk in seasons 1 to 8. From season 9 to 10, Jamai Loman replaced van Dijk as co-host. Season 11 is hosted by Loman and Quinty Misiedjan.

The show, developed after the success of The Voice of Holland, was made for children aged six to fourteen in the first season, and for those eight to fourteen in later seasons. The program was created by John de Mol Jr., and after achieving success in the Netherlands, the concept was marketed worldwide.

Seasons 1, 2, and 3 all began one week after the last episode of The Voice of Holland of each year. Season 4 was broadcast eight weeks after the finale of The Voice of Holland and aired on Saturday evenings. Seasons 5 until 10 aired directly after The Voice of Holland on Friday evenings.

Fabiënne Bergmans was the winner of the first season. Laura van Kaamwas was the second season's winner and Ayoub Maach won the third. Each received a record deal with 8ball Music, a music video, €10,000 scholarship and a trip to Disneyland Paris. Lucas Van Roekel won the fourth season, receiving a €10,000 scholarship and record deal. Esmée Schreurs won the fifth season and received a €25,000 scholarship, as did Iris Verhoek in the sixth season. Yosina Roemajauw won the seventh season and received a €25,000 scholarship and a single of her own. When he was 11, Silver Metz won the eighth season and received a €25,000 scholarship. Dax Hovius won the Voice Kids in the ninth season, earning a total of 25,000 euros. Emma Kok was the winner of season 10.

== Format ==
The show consists of four phases: production auditions, Blind Auditions, The Battles, and the finale. The production auditions are held for the purpose of selecting good singers and are not filmed. Where in Idols, Popstars, and The X Factor, they would then audition in front of the judges, in The Voice Kids, they do a blind audition, which is similar to the theatre rounds in the previously mentioned talent shows. During the blind auditions, the judges/coaches choose singers based on musicality and voice. Each candidate will have the opportunity to sing a song of their choice for about one and a half minutes. If one of the judges/coaches decides to place the artist in their team, they must press the "I Want You" button. When two or more coaches want the same artist on their team, the artist must choose which coach they want to work with.

When all the teams are full, the artists go to the next round with their coaches. These are "The Battles". Each coach groups three singers together to battle against each other by singing a song chosen by the coach. Every battle has one winner, who is picked by the coach and one other person. The act that wins automatically goes to the "Sing Off". Each team will have five acts in the Sing Off. There, all artists must sing a song from the blind auditions. In each team, only two candidates can be chosen to go to the finals.

After the Sing Offs, there are six finalists (seasons 1-6; four from season 7 onwards) who sing a song chosen in consultation with their coach. The audience at home can then vote on which act has to go home. The coaches decide together with the audience at home which act is eliminated; they each have half of the votes.

In the final stage, there is one finalist per team. The winner is named using public televoting.

== Coaches and hosts ==
Marco Borsato, Nick & Simon and Angela Groothuizen were announced as the judges/coaches of the first season in 2011. Roel van Velzen was originally planned to participate in the jury but had to withdraw after he became a father during the scheduled shooting period. The hosts from the adult version, Martijn Krabbé and Wendy van Dijk, were announced as hosts of The Voice Kids. The jury remained the same until the fifth season, while the hosts remained the same until the ninth season.

On April 17, 2015, Nick & Simon confirmed at RTL Late Night that they would quit The Voice Kids because they had many other projects which receive priority. From season 5, Nick & Simon and Angela Groothuizen were replaced by coaches from the adult show, Ilse DeLange and Ali B.

On the seventh season of the show, for the first time in the show's history, The Voice Kids added a fourth coach, Douwe Bob. Douwe Bob was replaced by Anouk in the eighth season.

On 22 February 2019, it was reported that Jamai Loman would replace Wendy van Dijk as host for season 9, as Van Dijk had moved from RTL 4 to SBS6. On 14 June 2019, it was announced that Sanne Hans would replace Ilse DeLange for the ninth season. On 5 June 2020, during the season 9 finale, it was announced that DeLange would return to the panel as a regular coach alongside Ali B and Hans for the tenth season. On 18 July 2020, it was announced that Snelle would replace Marco Borsato for the tenth season. But in January 2022, there were assault allegations made against band members and some coaches on the adult version on the show, this caused The Voice, The Voice Kids and The Voice Senior to be suspended until an investigation took place. Coach Ali B was suspended from the show after allegations were made against him. Marco Borsato (who had already left the show) also had allegations made against him.

On 31 March 2025, it was announced that the show will return in 2026 with coaches DeLange, Claude, Flemming, and Emma Heesters. On 22 November 2026 it was announced that Flemming would not return for season 12. Canadian/Dutch musician Aaron was announced as coach.

Coaches

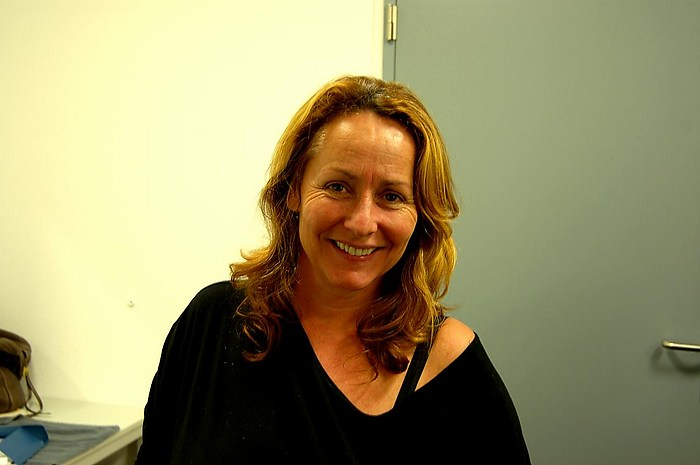
Angela Groothuizen (2012–2015)

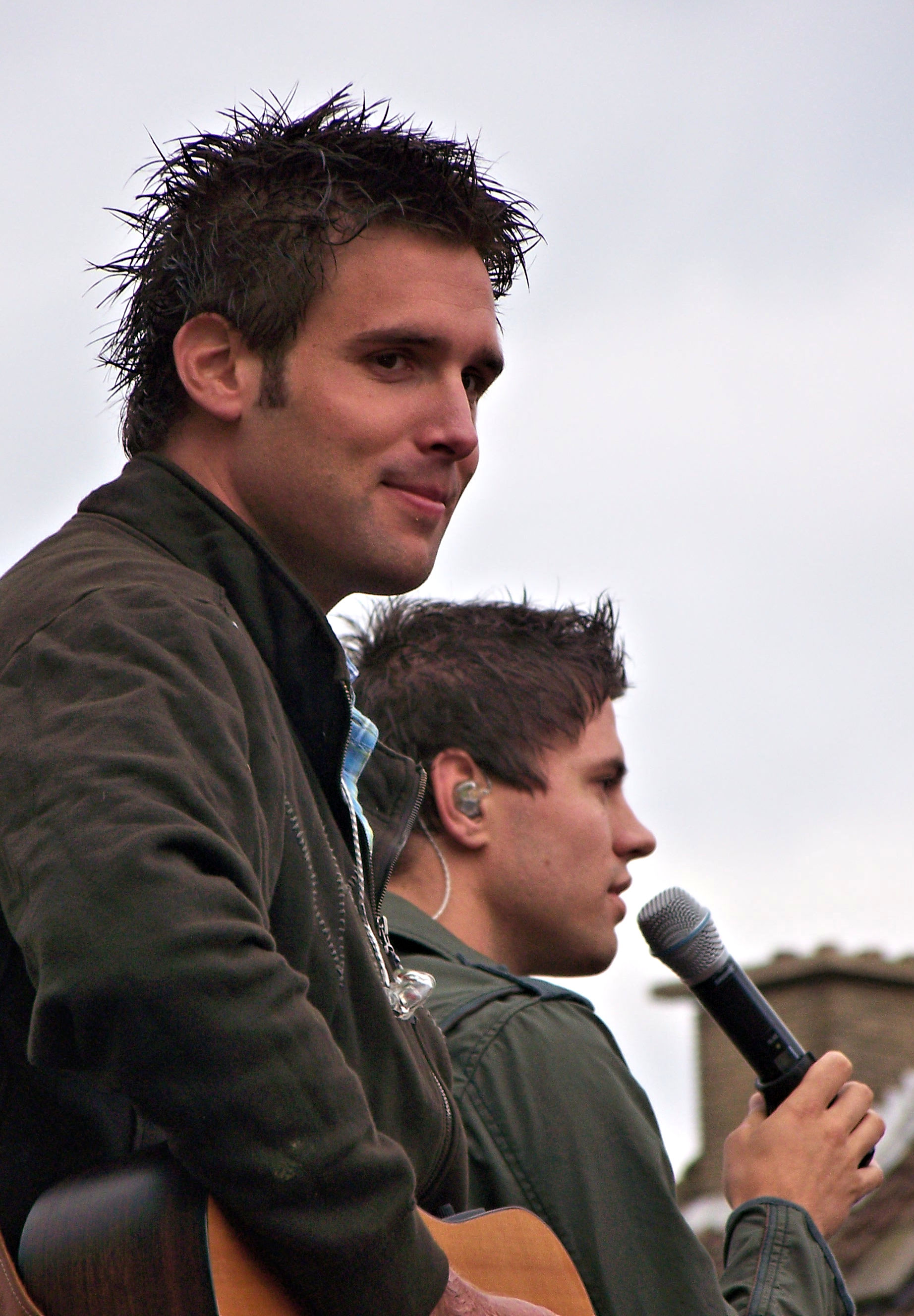
Nick & Simon (2012–2015)

Marco Borsato (2012–2020)

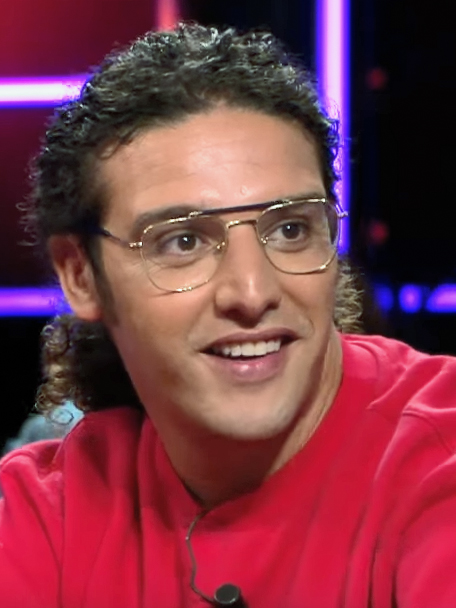
Ali B (2016–2021)

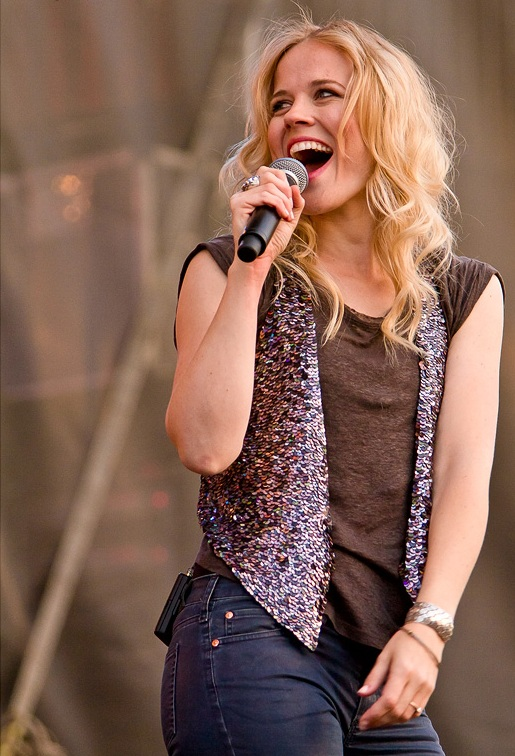
Ilse DeLange (2016–2019, 2021, 2026–present)

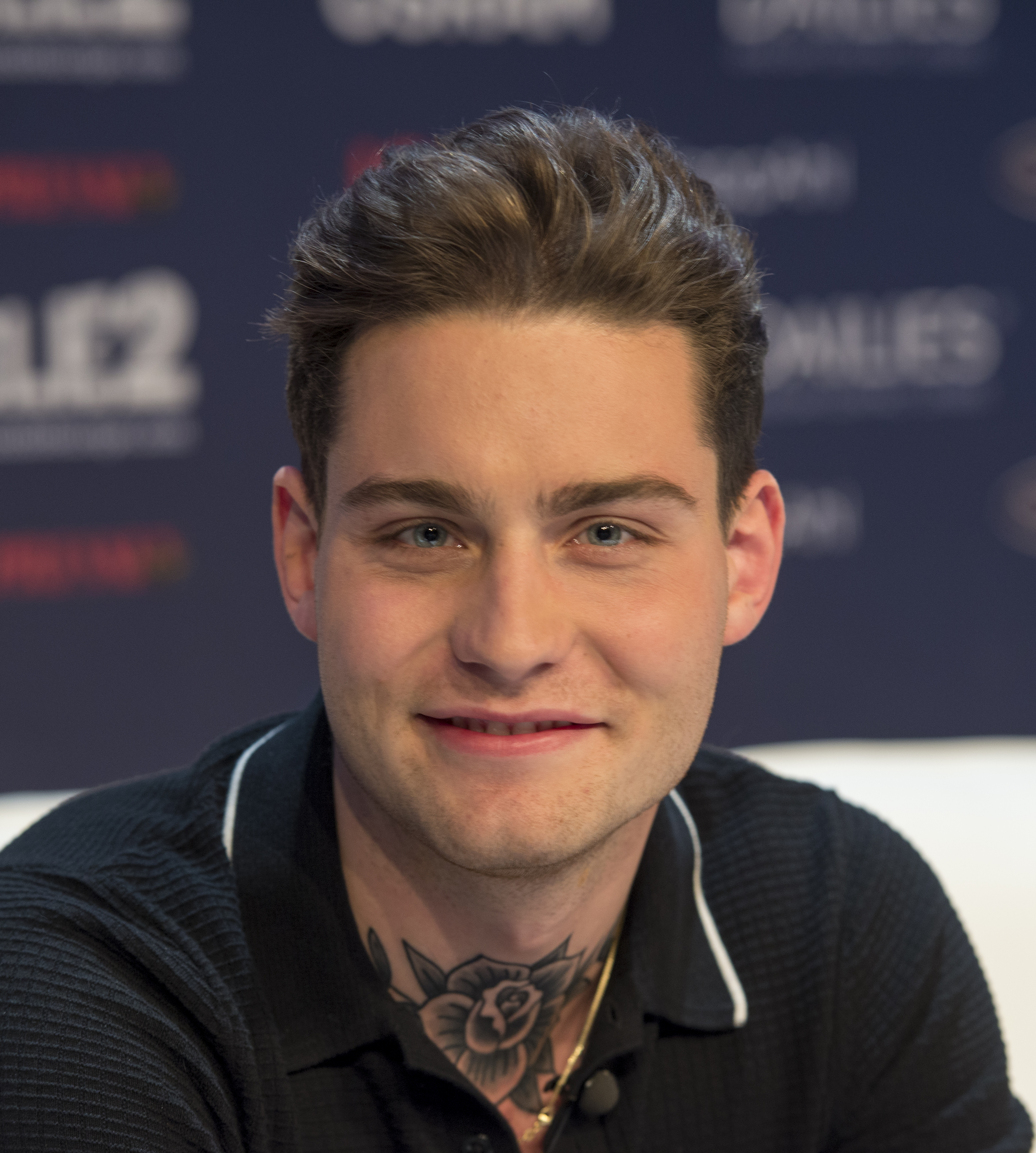
Douwe Bob (2018)

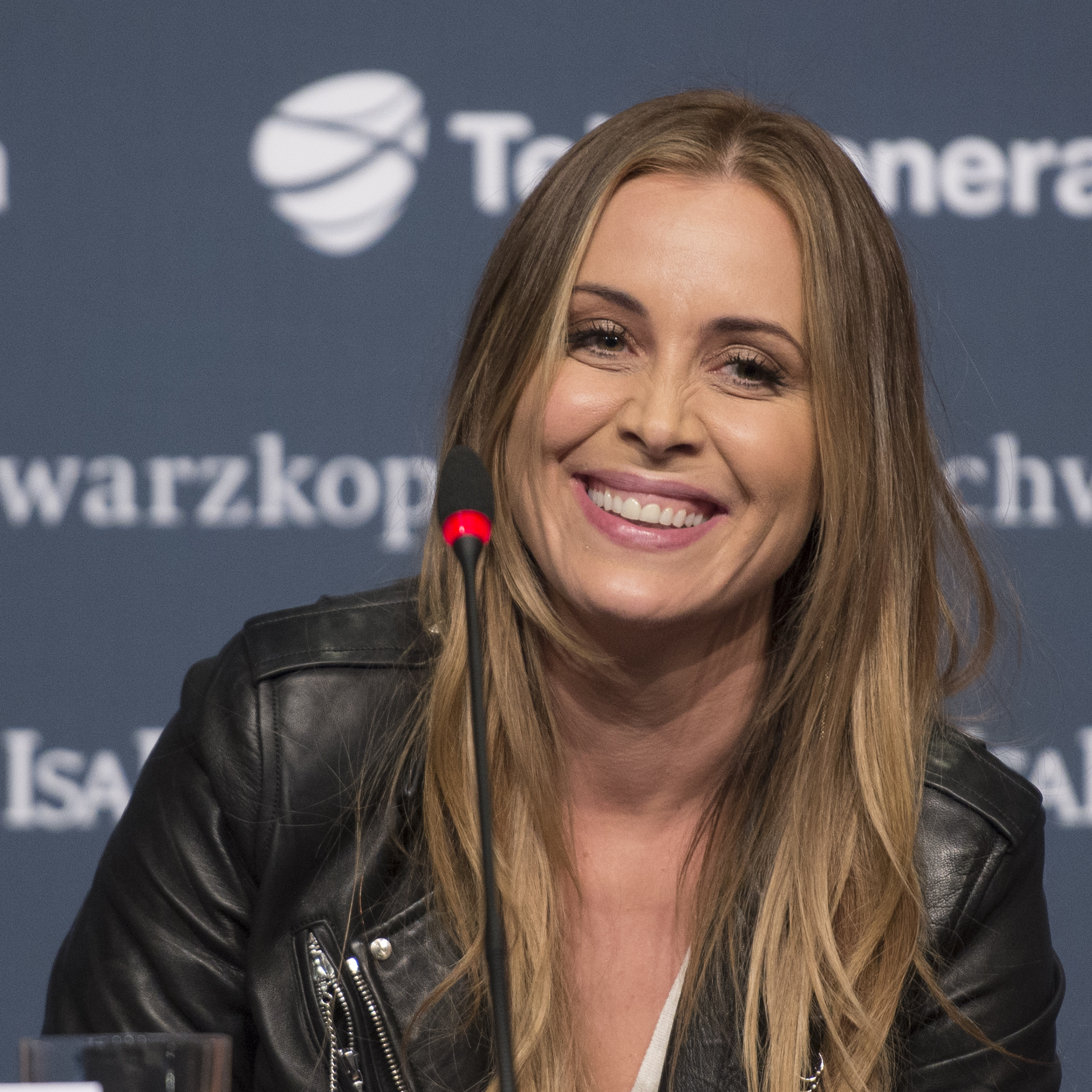
Anouk (2019–2020)

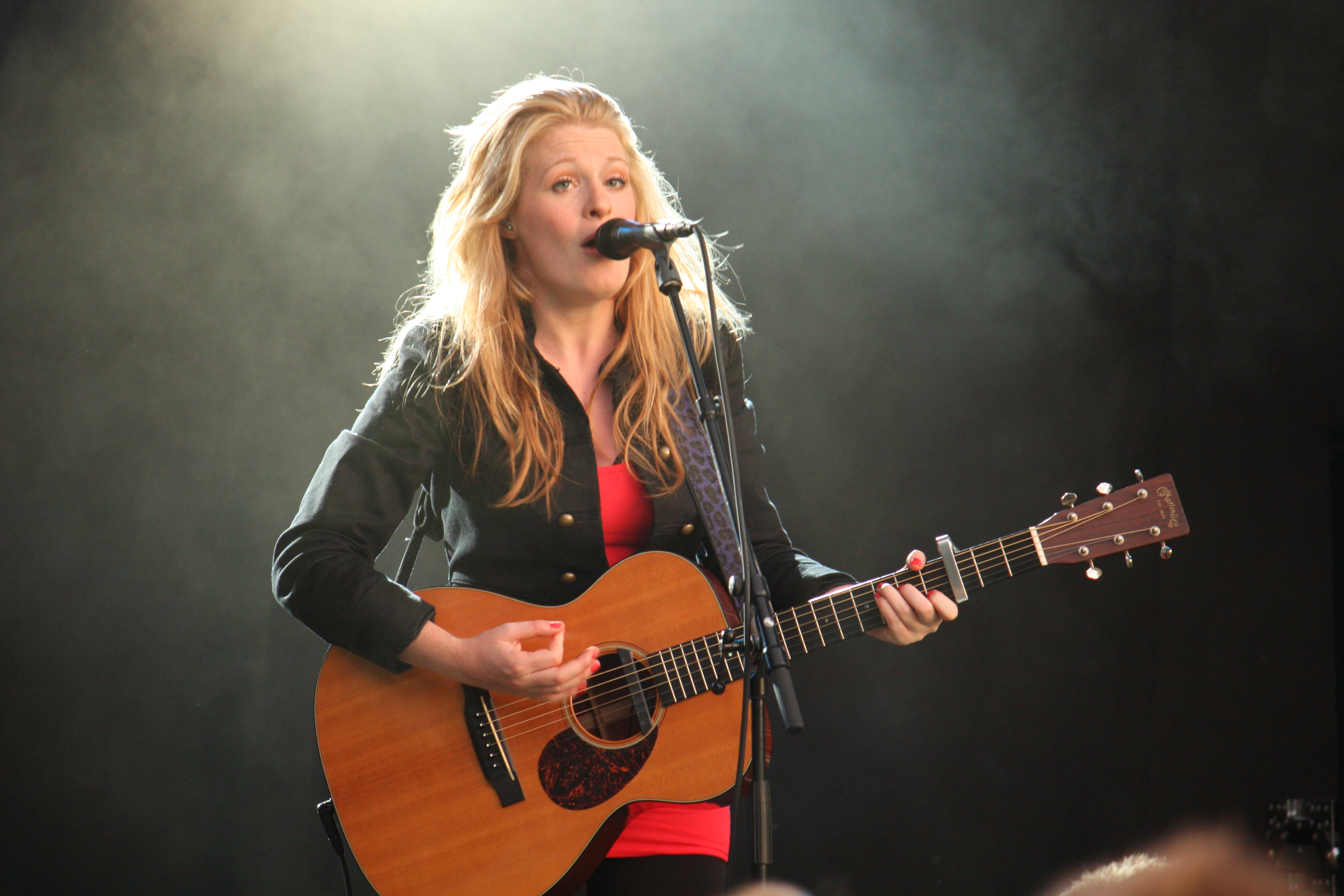
Sanne Hans (2020–2021)

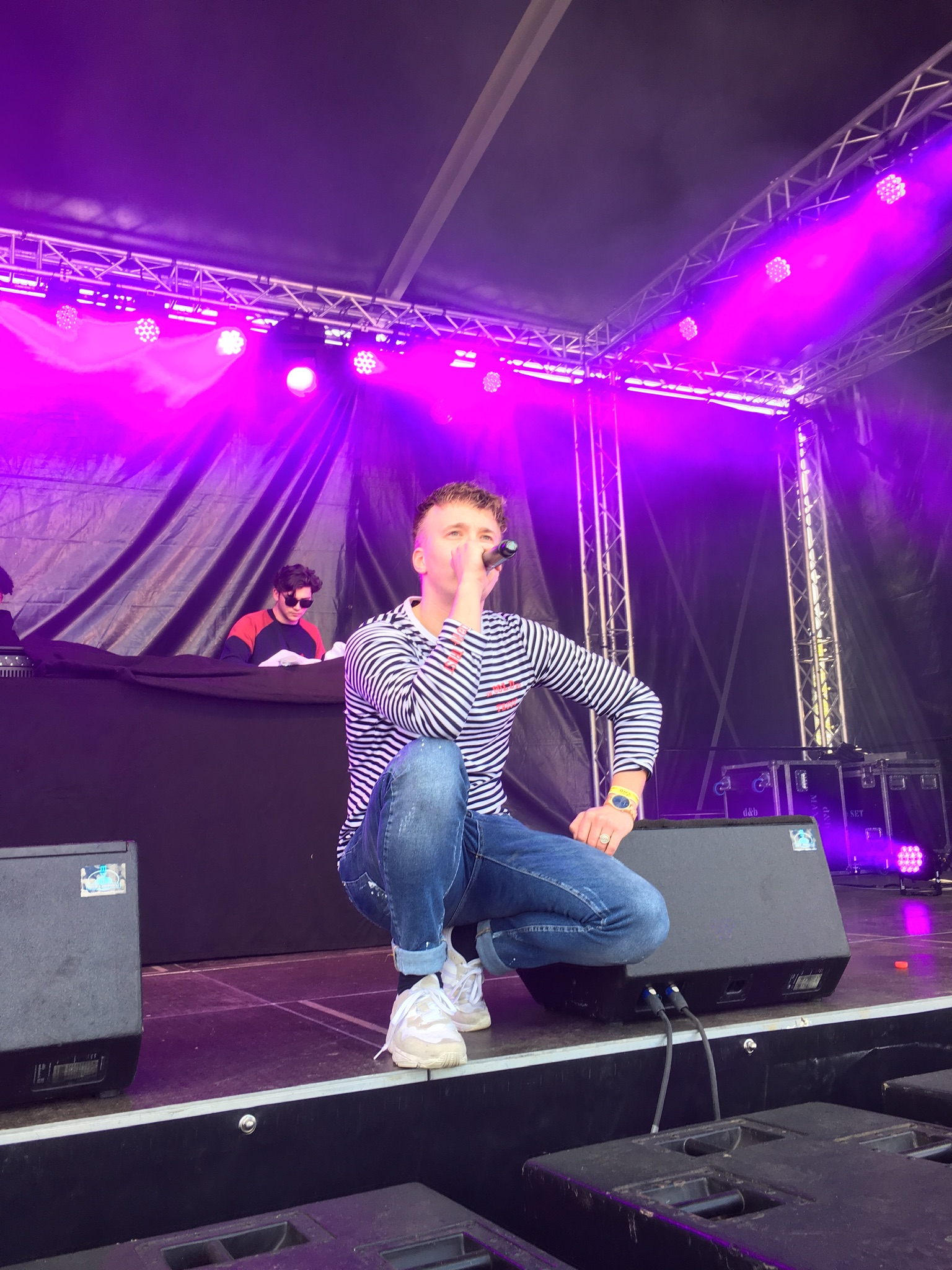
Snelle (2021)

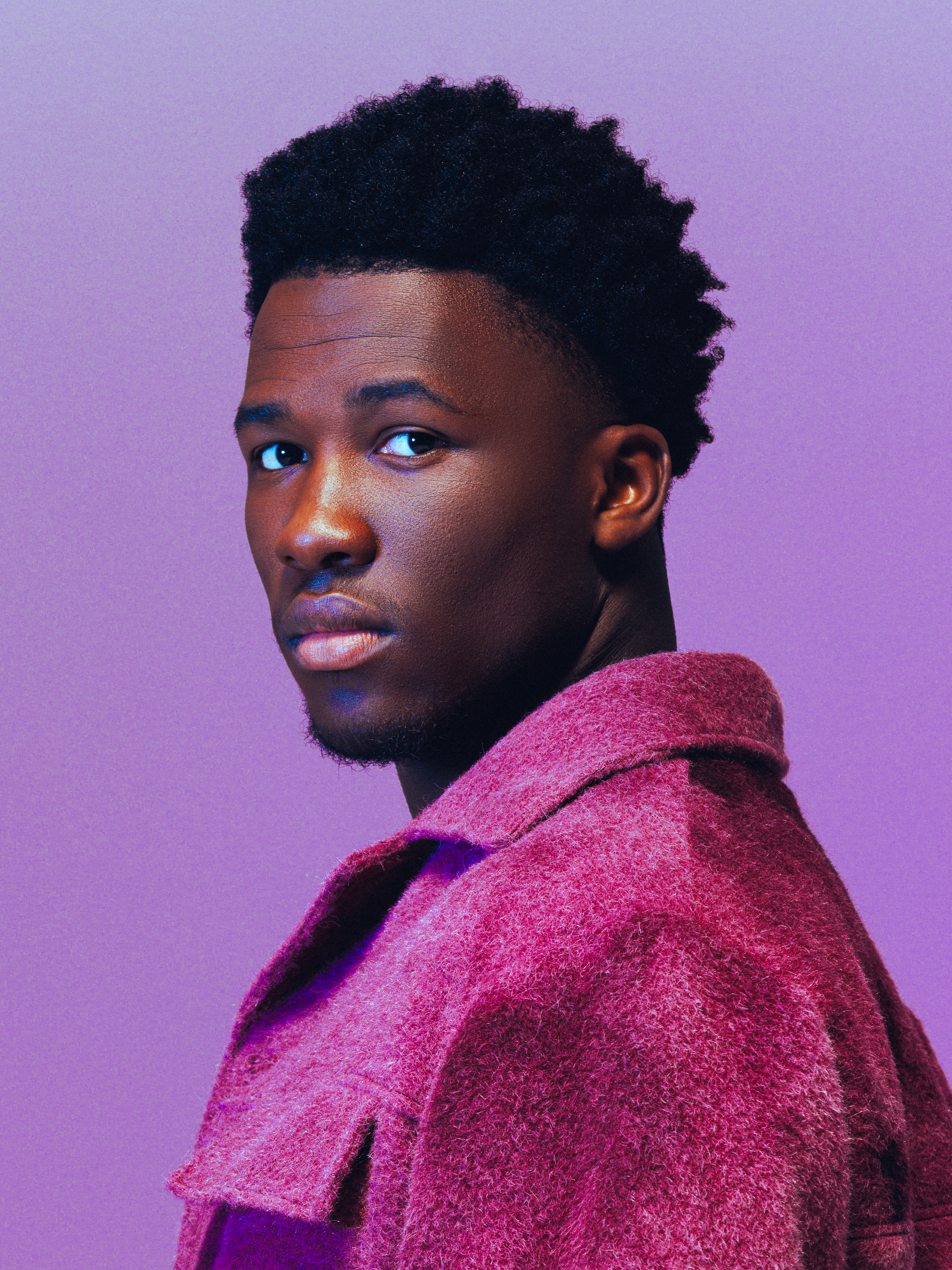
Claude (2026–present)

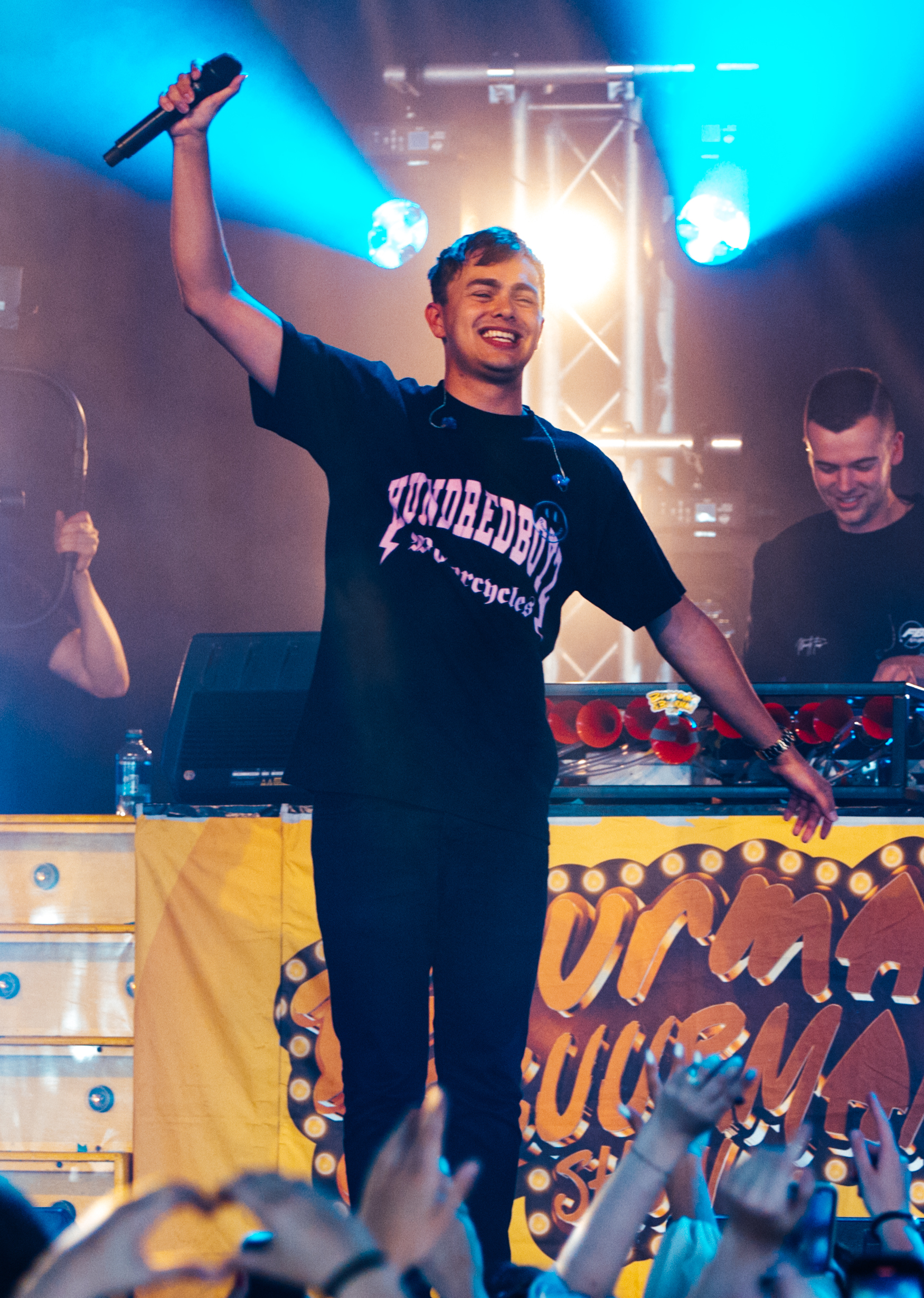
Flemming (2026–present)

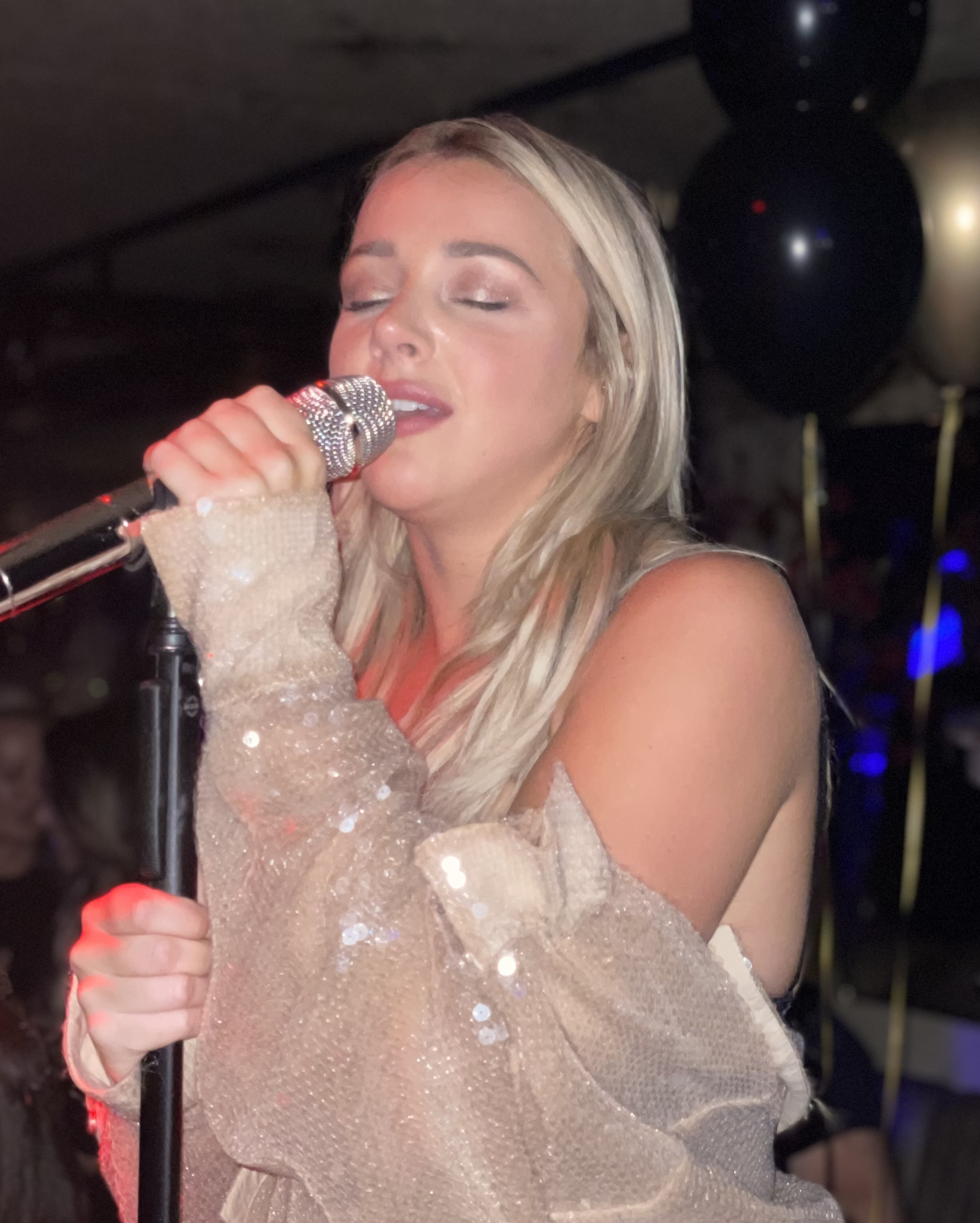
Emma Heesters (2026–present)

=== Timeline of coaches and hosts ===
Coaches	Seasons										
Coaches	1	2	3	4	5	6	7	8	9	10	11
Marco Borsato											
Angela Groothuizen											
Nick & Simon											
Ali B											
Ilse DeLange											
Douwe Bob											
Anouk											
Sanne Hans											
Snelle											
Claude											
Flemming											
Emma Heesters											
Host	Seasons										
Host	1	2	3	4	5	6	7	8	9	10	11
Martijn Krabbé											
Wendy van Dijk											
Jamai Loman											
Quinty Misiedjan											

=== Line-up of Coaches ===
Coaches' line-up by chairs order
Season	Year	Coaches			
Season	Year	1	2	3	4
1	2012	Marco	Nick & Simon	Angela	No fourth coach
2	2012-2013	Marco	Nick & Simon	Angela	No fourth coach
3	2013-2014	Marco	Nick & Simon	Angela	No fourth coach
4	2015	Marco	Nick & Simon	Angela	No fourth coach
5	2016	Marco	Ilse	Ali B	No fourth coach
6	2017	Marco	Ilse	Ali B	No fourth coach
7	2018	Marco	Ilse	Douwe Bob	Ali B
8	2019	Marco	Ilse	Anouk	Ali B
9	2020	Marco	Sanne	Anouk	Ali B
10	2021	Sanne	Snelle	Ilse	Ali B
11	2026	Claude	Ilse	Flemming	Emma

== Series overview ==
Warning: the following table presents a significant amount of different colors.

Teams color key
Artist from Team Angela	Artist from Team Ilse	Artist from Team Anouk
Artist from Team Marco	Artist from Team Ali B	Artist from Team Sanne
Artist from Team Nick & Simon	Artist from Team Douwe Bob	Artist from Team Snelle

Dutch The Voice Kids series overview
Season	Aired	Winner	Runner-up	Third Place	Fourth Place	Winning coach	Presenters
1	2012	Fabiënne Bergmans	Vajèn van den Bosch	Dave Dekker	No fourth finalist	Angela Groothuizen	Martijn Krabbé, Wendy van Dijk
2	2012-2013	Laura van Kaam	Irene Dings	Jurre Otto	No fourth finalist	Marco Borsato	Martijn Krabbé, Wendy van Dijk
3	2013-2014	Ayoub Maach	Isabel Provoost	Stephanie Habets	No fourth finalist	Marco Borsato	Martijn Krabbé, Wendy van Dijk
4	2015	Lucas van Roekel	Joy Schulte	Robin Buijs	No fourth finalist	Nick & Simon	Martijn Krabbé, Wendy van Dijk
5	2016	Esmée Schreurs	Imani Al Ebate	Selenay Dagdelen	No fourth finalist	Ilse DeLange	Martijn Krabbé, Wendy van Dijk
6	2017	Iris Verhoek	Merle Velthuis	Thijs Overpelt	No fourth finalist	Ali B	Martijn Krabbé, Wendy van Dijk
7	2018	Yosina Roemajauw	Eefje de Geus	Kaylee Landegent	Stella de Geus	Marco Borsato	Martijn Krabbé, Wendy van Dijk
8	2019	Silver Metz	Ralph Moerman	Robin Tinge	Sezina Steur	Ali B	Martijn Krabbé, Wendy van Dijk
9	2020	Dax Hovius	Jasmijn Schroder	Rogier Baris	Sham Tesfai	Sanne Hans	Krabbé, Jamai Loman
10	2021	Emma Kok	Faela van Deyzen	Marc Floor ten Brinke	Soufiane Soussan	Ali B	Krabbé, Jamai Loman
11	2026	Current season					Loman, Quinty Misiedjan

== Coaches' teams ==
Winner
Runner-up
Third place
Fourth place
Eliminated in the Final
Eliminated in the Sing-off
Eliminated in the Battles

=== Season 1 (2012) ===
Coaches	Top 45 Kids				
Marco	Vajèn	Melissa	Bram	Louise	Zendé
Marco	Aisha	Amy	Caroline	Eline	Gabbi
Marco	Maurits	Milo	Noémi	Serena	Shalisa
Nick & Simon	Dave	Channah	Bente	Milou	Pim
Nick & Simon	Chaima	Daya	Donny	Hadjer	Lois
Nick & Simon	Maxime	Romy	Ruben	Suze	Zoë
Angela	Fabiënne	Lieke	Amy	Brett	Vinchenzo
Angela	Aïsha	Annelotte	Brittany	Elaine	Jessie
Angela	Lennart	Lowieke	Mannus	Maxime	Rosan

=== Season 2 (2013) ===
Coaches	Top 45 Kids				
Marco	Laura	Jesse	Chelsea	Emma	Karijn
Marco	Anne	Celine	Finn	Hannah	Jasmijn
Marco	Jeske	Lindsay	Lyonne	Paddy	Piet
Nick & Simon	Irene	Joep	Amy	Chloë	Dani
Nick & Simon	Des'ray	Esmee	Irie	Lynn	Maartje
Nick & Simon	Maren	Marly	Shivani	Thijs	Tigo
Angela	Jurre	Silvana	Emma	Eva	Kim
Angela	Cheyenne	Daantje	Dounia	Ellie	Joël
Angela	Julia	Kerla	Nina	Rachel	Roan

=== Season 3 (2014) ===
Coaches	Top 45 Kids				
Marco	Ayoub	Demi	Dionne	Georgiefa	Pip
Marco	Alyssa	Ieke	Madelief	Merel	Renee
Marco	Rianne	Robin	Roeland	Souhaila	Stefania
Nick & Simon	Isabel	Katrina	Cas	Emmy	Jarmo
Nick & Simon	Anouk	Bodine	Floor	Ilse	Lara
Nick & Simon	Marlies	Merle	Noa	Pim	Romy
Angela	Stephanie	Nieloefaar	Fauve	Iris	Nikki
Angela	Bodi	Ilse	Iris	Kaitlyn	Kjelwyn
Angela	Luka	Luka	Melissa	Noaquin	Yara

=== Season 4 (2015) ===
Coaches	Top 45 Kids				
Marco	Robin	Redouan	Bogus	Florence	Sam
Marco	Carmen	Chloe	Isabella	Karel	Luuk
Marco	Mats	Shidainy	Simon	Silke	Stan
Nick & Simon	Lucas	Robine	Deniek	Kaylee	Stef
Nick & Simon	Bart	Emanuela	Geranne	Isis	Jennifer
Nick & Simon	Liz	Nanouk	Noa	Rosy	Uma
Angela	Joy	Numidia	Britney	Lara	Rafke
Angela	Davy	Emerance	Fienne	Jerome	Kyra
Angela	Marijn	Meike	Rafke	Sam	Shanelle

=== Season 5 (2016) ===
Coaches	Top 45 Kids				
Marco	Selenay	Bodine	Charlotte	Julie	Sammie
Marco	Alyssa	Anouk	Bram	Isabel	Jada & Senna
Marco	Job	Kwint	Lindsey	Lois	Maaike
Ilse	Esmée	Jaco	Britt	Britt	Isabelle
Ilse	Anna	Diego	Ilya	Jesse	Mannus
Ilse	Marise	Maya	Pien	Roos	Yoni
Ali B	Imani	Alexander	Des'ray	Rilona	Zakaria
Ali B	June	Beau	Maurice	Sezina	Lesley
Ali B	Claire	Germario	Valena	Jayliënne	Melissa

=== Season 6 (2017) ===
Coaches	Top 45 Kids				
Marco	Merle	Noa	Kato	Sanne	Tyra
Marco	Denne	Jean	Jessica	Maya	Michelle
Marco	Rosa	Sophie	Stef	Tess	Wieke
Ilse	Thijs	Raya	Fenne	Lois	Marijn
Ilse	Felicia	Jada	Julia	Kimiya	Lindi
Ilse	Max	Niels	Nienke	Sam	Toby
Ali B	Iris	Anna	Chavanté	Loeki	Gwen
Ali B	Amélie	Luana	Martijn	Romy	Lygeena
Ali B	Max	Kaylee	Max	Roula	Jairo

=== Season 7 (2018) ===
Coaches	Top 48 Kids			
Marco	Yosina	Anne	Cyanne	Karlijn
Marco	Baukje	Eline	Emma	Jazz
Marco	Kiya	Madelief	Myron	Rosalyn
Ilse	Eefje	Billie	Sem	Vlera
Ilse	Anouk	Cloë	Fabienne	Maya
Ilse	Thomas	Tim	Sabien	Sita
Douwe Bob	Kaylee	Lindsey	Sammie	Sterre
Douwe Bob	Alexander	Blieta	Bram	Manouk
Douwe Bob	Nova	Sanna	Thijs	Thimo
Ali B	Stella	Montana	Nikia	Joran
Ali B	Mitchell	Senna	Robine	Reduan
Ali B	Roya	Fariñho	Sofie	Cain

=== Season 8 (2019) ===
Coaches	Top 47 Kids			
Marco	Sezina	Britt	Janae	Keelan
Marco	Britte	Lars	Lilia	Lindita
Marco	Marit	Mirthe	Nancy	Roos
Ilse	Ralph	Amy	Louise	Pascale
Ilse	Danique	Estelle	Indi	Merel
Ilse	Nishelsea	Noa	Sien	Teun
Anouk	Robin	Ashley	Carlotta	Isabelle
Anouk	Feej	Jens	Madelon	Marly
Anouk	Morgaine	Norah	Rilona	Rosalie
Ali B	Silver	Anouk	Benjamin	Priscilla
Ali B	Sam	Claude	Eva	Luit
Ali B	Naomi	Samuel	Tijs	

=== Season 9 (2020) ===
Coaches	Top 48 Kids			
Marco	Jasmijn	Beau	Isabeau	Merle
Marco	Brandon	Ceder	Hanne	Joëlla
Marco	Nora	Roos	Sabien	Sam
Sanne	Dax	Essi	Sarah	Thomas
Sanne	Jules	Julia	Loïs	Marie
Sanne	Melissa	Merle	Stian	Yentl
Anouk	Rogier	Jada	Milika	Romy
Anouk	Angelina	Faye	Lenya	Maud
Anouk	Riley	Romana	Silvan	Thijmen
Ali B	Sham	Elif	Ilyza	Lyova
Ali B	Asija	Bobby	Frida	Missy
Ali B	Mylena	Noa	Sofie	Zoë

=== Season 10 (2021) ===
Coaches	Top 50 Kids			
Sanne	Soufiane	Bente	Daniël	Elaine
Sanne	Celia	Dolce	Kaj	Linn
Sanne	Miles	Noa	Sam	Timme
Snelle	Marc Floor	Eva	Manouk	Shanoa
Snelle	Alex	Eden	Josephine	Joya
Snelle	Liz	Lynn	Mijntje	Thijs
Ilse	Faela	Ayah	Guusje	Merle
Ilse	Sapphire	Amy	Inanna	Jenai
Ilse	Lilia	Meyra	Queen-Zhanel	Robin
Ilse	Roos	Tyar		
Ali B	Emma Kok	Eliahna	Febe	Sema
Ali B	Aysara	Loeka	Mayasara	Nimrod
Ali B	Pluim	Ryan	Sunflower & Gina	Zahra

=== Season 11 (2026) ===
Coaches	Top TBA Kids			
Claude	Natalya	Julian	Adil	Lizzie
Claude	Noah			
Ilse	Ceyda	Shanaya		
Flemming	Dovydas	Fay	Lotus	Niek
Flemming	Joy			
Emma	Janessy	Elina	Mila	
