= Chaand Baaliyan =

Song by Aditya A

Song by Aditya A

from the album Chaand Baaliyan
- Released: March 28, 2020
- Recorded: 2020
- Genre: Romantic
- Length: 1:43
- Label: Sony Music Entertainment India Pvt Ltd
- Songwriter(s): Aditya A
- Producer(s): Aditya A

"Chaand Baaliyan" is a song by Indian singer-songwriter Aditya A. The song has charted No 1 on Apple Music and iTunes Chart in India. It was also ranking on 45th position on YouTube Charts in India. As of April 2022 "Chaand Baaliyan" was a trending song on Instagram Reels as well. Aditya had released the song in the year 2019, which went viral two years after its release.

== Popularity ==
The song started gaining more reach when Bollywood celebrities started making Instagram Reels on the song.

- Alia Bhatt & Bhavin Bhanushali made the reel on it which has 2.6+ millions hits on it.
- Siddhant Chaturvedi made reel on the song as well.
- Dutch singer Emma Heesters covered the song which has over half a million hits on YouTube.
