= The Voice Kids (Dutch TV series) season 1 =

The Voice Kids
- Season 1
- Hosted by: Martijn Krabbé; Wendy van Dijk
- Coaches: Marco Borsato; Nick & Simon; Angela Groothuizen
- Winner: Fabiënne Bergmans
- Winning coach: Angela Groothuizen
- Runners-up: Vajèn van den Bosch & Dave Dekker

Release
- Original network: RTL4
- Original release: 27 January – 23 March 2012

The Voice Kids is a Dutch television program produced by Talpa Productions and is broadcast on RTL 4. It is based on The Voice of Holland. Participation is only open to children between the ages of eight and fourteen.

The first season aired between 27 January and 23 March 2012. It was presented by Martijn Krabbé and Wendy van Dijk. The coaching was done by Angela Groothuizen, Marco Borsato, and Nick & Simon. The winner was Fabiënne Bergmans from Team Angela, marking Groothuizen's first and only win as a coach.

== The Blind Auditions ==
Four judges/coaches, all noteworthy recording artists, choose teams of contestants through a blind audition process. Each judge has the length of the auditioner's performance (about ninety seconds) to decide if he or she wants that singer on his or her team. If two or more judges want the same singer (as happens frequently), the singer has the final choice of coach.

=== The Blind Auditions, Part 1 ===
Key	Coach presses his or her button	Contestant eliminated with no coach pressing his or her button	Contestant defaulted to this coach's team	Contestant elected to join this coach's team

Order	Contestant	Song	Coach's and contestant's choices		
Order	Contestant	Song	Marco	Nick & Simon	Angela
1	Robin, 12	"The Climb"	—	—	—
2	Dave, 14	"Geef mij je angst"			
3	Eline, 14	"Get Here"		—	—
4	Lieke, 12	"Bottles"			
5	Annelotte, 14	"Skinny Love"			
6	Rozemarijn, 11	"Mercy"	—	—	—
7	Hadjer, 14	"Halo"	—		—
8	Wesley, 13	"You Give Me Something"	—	—	—
9	Fabiënne, 13	"The A Team"			
10	Zendé, 9	"Here I Am"			

=== The Blind Auditions, Part 2 ===
Order	Contestant	Song	Coach's and contestant's choices		
Order	Contestant	Song	Marco	Nick & Simon	Angela
1	Channah, 10	"Mercy"			
2	Mannus, 11	"Price Tag"	—	—	
3	Zoë, 14	"If I Ain't Got You"			—
4	Eva, 14	"Empire State of Mind"	—	—	—
5	Donny, 13	"True Colors"			—
6	Melissa, 14	"Jar of Hearts"			—
7	Cheyenne, 10	"Use Somebody"	—	—	—
8	Brittany, 13	"Whataya Want from Me"	—		
9	Emanuela, 12	"La solitudine"	—	—	—
10	Brett, 12	"Love You More"			
11	Amy, 11	"Bleeding Love"			

=== The Blind Auditions, Part 3 ===
Order	Contestant	Song	Coach's and contestant's choices		
Order	Contestant	Song	Marco	Nick & Simon	Angela
1	Aisha, 11	"Vlieg met me mee"		—	
2	Phoebe, 12	"Someone Like You"	—	—	—
3	Lennart, 13	"The A Team"			
4	Chaima, 13	"Valerie"	—		—
5	Milo, 13	"No Mercy"		—	
6	Yahya, 13	"Better in Time"	—	—	—
7	Caroline, 12	"Use Somebody"			—
8	Amber, 13	"Sunday Morning"	—	—	—
9	Elaine, 11	"Paparazzi"	—	—	
10	Bram, 13	"You Give Me Something"			
11	Romy, 12	"Something in the water"	—		—
12	Aïsha, 12	"Listen"			

=== The Blind Auditions, Part 4 ===
Order	Contestant	Song	Coach's and contestant's choices		
Order	Contestant	Song	Marco	Nick & Simon	Angela
1	Lowieke, 12	"A Night Like This"		—	
2	Sebastiaan, 11	"Pak maar m'n hand"	—	—	—
3	Louise, 13	"Foolin"			—
4	Vajèn, 13	"The Climb"			
5	Dewi, 12	"Sweet Goodbyes"	—	—	—
6	Vinchenzo, 12	"You Give Me Something"	—	—	
7	Gabbi, 11	"Bubbly"		—	—
8	Lois, 14	"Underneath Your Clothes"	—		—
9	Suze, 12	"Whataya Want from Me"	—		—
10	Ella, 11	"Lullaby of Birdland"	—	—	—
11	Pim, 14	"Love You More"			
12	Amy, 14	"I Say A Little Prayer"		—	—
13	Rosan, 14	"Sunday Morning"	—	—	
14	Daya, 10	"Beautiful"	—		—

=== The Blind Auditions, Part 5 ===
Order	Contestant	Song	Coach's and contestant's choices		
Order	Contestant	Song	Marco	Nick & Simon	Angela
1	Maxime, 13	"Valerie"	—		
2	Tim, 13	"Grenade"	—	—	—
3	Bente, 11	"Lost"			
4	Noémi, 13	"Born This Way"			
5	Jamie, 11	"Take a Bow"	—	—	—
6	Maurits, 12	"Use Somebody"			
7	Jessie, 13	"I'm Yours"	—	—	
8	Raffie, 12	"Here Without You"	—	—	—
9	Serena, 13	"When You Say Nothing at All"		—	—
10	Maxime, 13	"Price Tag"			
11	Ruben, 13	"Sterrenstof"			
12	Shalisa, 12	"Bottles"		—	—
13	Milou, 14	"Nobody's Perfect"			—

== The Battles ==
In the second stage, called the battle phase, coaches have three of their team members battle against each other directly by singing the same song together, with the coach choosing which team member to advance from each of individual "battles" into the Sing-Off stage.

Marco Borsato	Nick & Simon	Angela Groothuizen	Vocal Coach
Yes-R	Marcel Fisser	Sven Figee	Babette Labeij

– Battle Winner
– Eliminated

Episode/Order	Coach	Winner	Eliminated		Song
1.1	Nick & Simon	Milou	Hadjer	Lois	"Bills, Bills, Bills"
1.2	Nick & Simon	Dave	Ruben	Suze	"Hou me vast"
1.3	Nick & Simon	Bente	Chaima	Donny	"Somebody that I used to know"
1.4	Nick & Simon	Pim	Maxime	Zoë	"Don't go breaking my heart"
1.5	Nick & Simon	Channah	Daya	Romy	"Runaway Baby"
2.1	Angela Groothuizen	Amy	Aïsha	Mannus	"Hush hush"
2.2	Angela Groothuizen	Brett	Elaine	Maxime	"Broken Strings"
2.3	Angela Groothuizen	Fabiënne	Brittany	Rosan	"Poker Face"
2.4	Angela Groothuizen	Lieke	Annelotte	Jessie	"Thinking of You"
2.5	Angela Groothuizen	Vinchenzo	Lennart	Lowieke	"Paradise"
3.1	Marco Borsato	Melissa	Amy	Shalisa	"Without You"
3.2	Marco Borsato	Bram	Maurits	Milo	"Every Teardrop Is a Waterfall"
3.3	Marco Borsato	Vajèn	Eline	Serena	"Landslide"
3.4	Marco Borsato	Zendé	Aisha	Gabbi	"This Is Me"
3.5	Marco Borsato	Louise	Caroline	Noémi	"Domino"

== The Sing-Off ==
Each coach brought his or her team after the "Battle" back to five acts, but there were only two candidates to the final. All five contestants will battle each other in "The Sing-Off", where they re-sung their audition song. The coaches then selected two of the five contestants to move to the live finals.

– Chosen as Finalist
– Eliminated

Sing Off #	Coach	Contestant	Song
1	Nick & Simon	Bente	"Lost"
1	Nick & Simon	Channah	"Mercy"
1	Nick & Simon	Dave	"Geef mij je angst"
1	Nick & Simon	Milou	"Nobody's Perfect"
1	Nick & Simon	Pim	"Love You More"
2	Angela Groothuizen	Amy	"Bleeding Love"
2	Angela Groothuizen	Brett	"Love You More"
2	Angela Groothuizen	Fabiënne	"The A Team"
2	Angela Groothuizen	Lieke	"Bottles"
2	Angela Groothuizen	Vinchenzo	"You Give Me Something"
3	Marco Borsato	Bram	"You Give Me Something"
3	Marco Borsato	Louise	"Foolin"
3	Marco Borsato	Melissa	"Jar of Hearts"
3	Marco Borsato	Vajèn	"The Climb"
3	Marco Borsato	Zendé	"Here I Am"

== Live ==
=== Teams ===
- Winner
- Runner-up
- Third place
- Finalist

Team
Marco	Nick & Simon	Angela
Vajèn van den Bosch	Dave Dekker	Fabiënne Bergmans
Melissa Meewisse	Channah van Wingerden	Lieke van 't Veer

=== Show ===
==== Competition Performances ====
Sequence	Coach	Finalist	Type	Song	Result
1	Angela Groothuizen	Lieke	Solo	"Take a Bow"	Eliminated
2	Marco Borsato	Melissa & Vajèn (with Marco Borsato)	Trio	"Voorbij"	
3	Nick & Simon	Channah	Solo	"Rolling in the Deep"	Eliminated
4	Marco Borsato	Vajèn	Solo	"Because of You"	Safe
5	Angela Groothuizen	Fabiënne & Lieke (with Angela Groothuizen)	Trio	"Yoü and I"	
6	Nick & Simon	Dave	Solo	"Laat me"	Safe
7	Marco Borsato	Melissa	Solo	"I will always love you"	Eliminated
8	Nick & Simon	Channah & Dave (with Nick & Simon)	Quartet	"Holiday in Spain"	
9	Angela Groothuizen	Fabiënne	Solo	"Something's Got a Hold on Me"	Safe

==== Non-Competition performance ====
Performers	Song
All 6 Finalists	"Stronger (What Doesn't Kill You)"

==== Celebrity performance ====
Performer	Nummer
Ben Saunders	"Heart strings (This is love)"

==== Results ====
Selecting the three finalists was based on two aspects, voting by the three coaches and televoting by viewers at home. Both the coaches and the public each had up to one-hundred points to give to their favorite finalist.

Finalist	Coach	Points from coach	Points from public	Total	Result
Melissa	Marco Borsato	30	38.4	68.4	Eliminated
Vajèn	Marco Borsato	70	61.6	131.6	Finalist
Channah	Nick & Simon	35	36.1	71.1	Eliminated
Dave	Nick & Simon	65	63.9	128.9	Finalist
Fabiënne	Angela Groothuizen	56	74.6	130.6	Finalist
Lieke	Angela Groothuizen	44	25.4	69.4	Eliminated

==== Finale ====
Channah, Lieke, and Melissa were immediately eliminated. Then were the finalists Dave, Fabiënne, and Vajèn.

Sequence	Finalist	Song	Result
1	Vajèn	"Show Me Heaven"	Runner-Up
2	Dave	"Toen ik je zag"	Third Place
3	Fabiënne	"What you're made of"	WINNER

== Viewing Figures ==
Episode	Date	Viewers	Place	Kdh.	Madl.	Source
Blind Audition 1	27 January 2012	2,797,000	1	18.2%	34.8%	
Blind Audition 2	3 February 2012	3,053,000	1	19.9%	35.2%	
Blind Audition 3	10 February 2012	2,766,000	1	18.0%	34.2%	
Blind Audition 4	17 February 2012	2,855,000	1	18.6%	35.0%	
Blind Audition 5	24 February 2012	2,584,000	1	16.9%	33.3%	
The Battle 1	2 March 2012	2,688,000	1	17.5%	33.5%	
The Battle 2	9 March 2012	2,546,000	1	18.6%	32.3%	
The Battle 3	16 March 2012	2,504,000	1	16.3%	31.8%	
Finale	23 March 2012	2,786,000	1	18.2%	37.3%	

== Discography ==
=== Albums ===
Album title	Release date	Charting in the Dutch Album Top 100			Comments
Album title	Release date	Date of entry	Highest	Weeks	Comments
The Voice Kids - The songs	02-03-2012	-			

=== Songs ===
Single title	Release date	Charting in the Dutch Top 40			Comments
Single title	Release date	Date of entry	Highest	Weeks	Comments
A-Team	27-01-2012	-			by Fabiënne Bergmans / Nr. 13 in the Single Top 100
The climb	17-02-2012	-			by Vajèn van den Bosch / Nr. 10 in the Single Top 100
Jar of hearts	03-02-2012	-			by Melissa Meewisse / Nr. 48 in the Single Top 100
Geef mij je angst	27-01-2012	-			by Dave Dekker / Nr. 95 in the Single Top 100
A moment like this	23-03-2012	-			by Melissa Meewisse / Nr. 75 in the Single Top 100
Show me heaven	23-03-2012	-			by Vajèn van den Bosch / Nr. 26 in the Single Top 100
Toen ik je zag	23-03-2012	-			by Dave Dekker / Nr. 24 in the Single Top 100
What you're made of	23-03-2012	07-04-2012	38	2	by Fabiënne Bergmans / Nr. 5 in the Single Top 100

== Trivia ==
- All episodes of The Voice Kids were recorded in studio 1 in Aalsmeer.
- Early November 2011: the auditions had closed because there were already 17,000 applications.
- Before the start of The Voice Kids on 25 January 2012, there was a press conference of the coaches. The interviewers were 24 students from different schools, so that a report could be written to their school.
