= Iris Verhoek =

Dutch singer

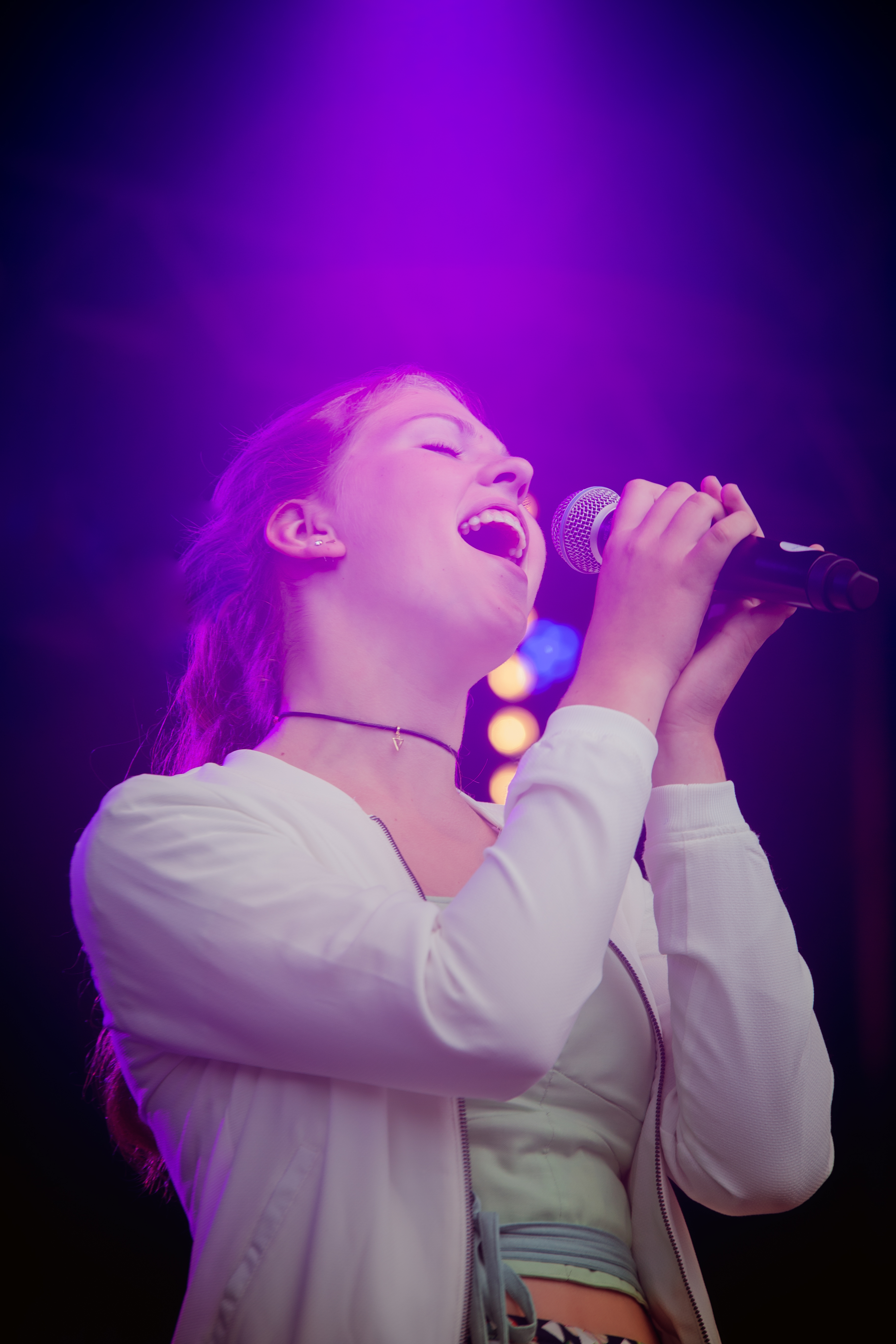
- Iris Verhoek at the Baggerfestival Sliedrecht 2017 (photocredits Wim Roelsma)

Background information
- Born: 12 September 2001 (age 24)
- Genres: Pop,
- Occupation: Singer
- Years active: 2011–present
- Website: irisverhoek.nl

Iris Verhoek (born 12 September 2001) is a Dutch singer who won the 6th season of The Voice Kids in 2017.

== Biography ==
In 2011 Verhoek had already won the Zeewoldse kidssongfestival and played Keesie in the musical Kruimeltje. In 2012 musical producer Albert Verlinde announced that Verhoek was going to be playing one of the leading players in the musical Annie.

At the age of 12, Verhoek participated in The Voice Kids season 3. She didn't make it into the finals. In 2017 she participated again, winning the finals on 21 April 2017. Her first single Battlecry, was released 13 October 2017 .

Awards and achievements
Preceded by Ésmée Schreurs	The Voice Kids; Winner; 2017	Succeeded by Yosina Roemajauw
