= Marco (Marco Borsato album) =

Studio album by Marco Borsato
- Released: 17 September 1994
- Length: 42:06
- Label: Polydor Records
- Producer: Hans van Eijck, Patrick Mühren

Marco Borsato chronology
Giorno per giorno (1992)	Marco (1994)	Als geen ander (1995)

Singles from Marco
- 1. "Dromen zijn bedrog" Released: 17 September 1994; 2. "Waarom nou jij" Released: 12 November 1994

Marco is the fourth studio album by Dutch artist Marco Borsato. It was released on 17 September 1994 through Polydor Records.

== Track listing ==
Marco – Standard edition
No.	Title	Writer(s)	Producer(s)	Length
1.	"Dromen zijn bedrog"	Maurizio Fabrizio; Riccardo Fogli; Leo Driessen; Han Kooreneef; Guido Morra	John Ewbank	4:03
2.	"Domenica"	Robert Long; Adelmo Fornaciari	Ewbank	5:31
3.	"Als de wereld van ons is"	Eros Ramazzotti; Alberto Salermo; Long; Renato Brioschi	Ewbank	3:12
4.	"Alles kwijt"	Giancarlo Bigazzi; Umberto Tozzi; Raffaele Riefoli; Ewbank	Ewbank	5:41
5.	"Waarom nou jij"	Riccardo Cocciante; Amerigo Cassella; Driessen; Kooreneef; Marco Luberti	Ewbank	4:49
6.	"Zo maar een mens"	Kooreneef; Carlo Marrale; Sergio Cossu; Aldo Stellita	Ewbank	3:36
7.	"Een liefde voor het leven"	Jan Tekstra; Paolo Vallesi	Ewbank	4:27
8.	"Hij had het willen zeggen"	Dario Baldan Bembo; Ewbank	Ewbank	3:36
9.	"Neem je leven"	Bigazzi; Riefoli; Gianni Albini; Ewbank	Ewbank	3:56
10.	"Zeven weken"	Baldan Bembo; S. Fabrizio; Ewbank	Ewbank	3:13
Total length:				42:06

== Personnel ==
Credits for Marco adapted from discogs.com.

- Marco Borsato – lead vocals
- Kees ten Dam – saxophone
- John Ewbank – lyrics, music, production, arrangements, keyboards, piano, additional vocals
- Jody's Singers – background vocals
- Arnold Mühren – additional vocals
- Patrick Mühren – drums, percussion, mixing
- Stylus Horns – horns
- Jan Tekstra – acoustic guitar, bass
- Rob Winter – guitar
- Hans van Eijck- production, lyrics, composer

== Chart performance ==
=== Weekly charts ===
Chart (1994)	Peak position
Belgian Albums (Ultratop Flanders)	7
Dutch Albums (Album Top 100)	2

=== Year-end charts ===
Chart (1994)	Position
Dutch Albums Chart	13
Chart (1995)	Position
Belgian Albums Chart (Flanders)	18
Dutch Albums Chart	3
Chart (1996)	Position
Dutch Albums Chart	44

== Certifications ==
Region	Certification	Certified units/sales
Belgium (BRMA)	Gold	25,000^{*}
Netherlands (NVPI)	4× Platinum	400,000^{^}
^{*} Sales figures based on certification alone.^{^} Shipments figures based on certification alone.
