= Flemming (singer) =

Dutch musician (born 1996)

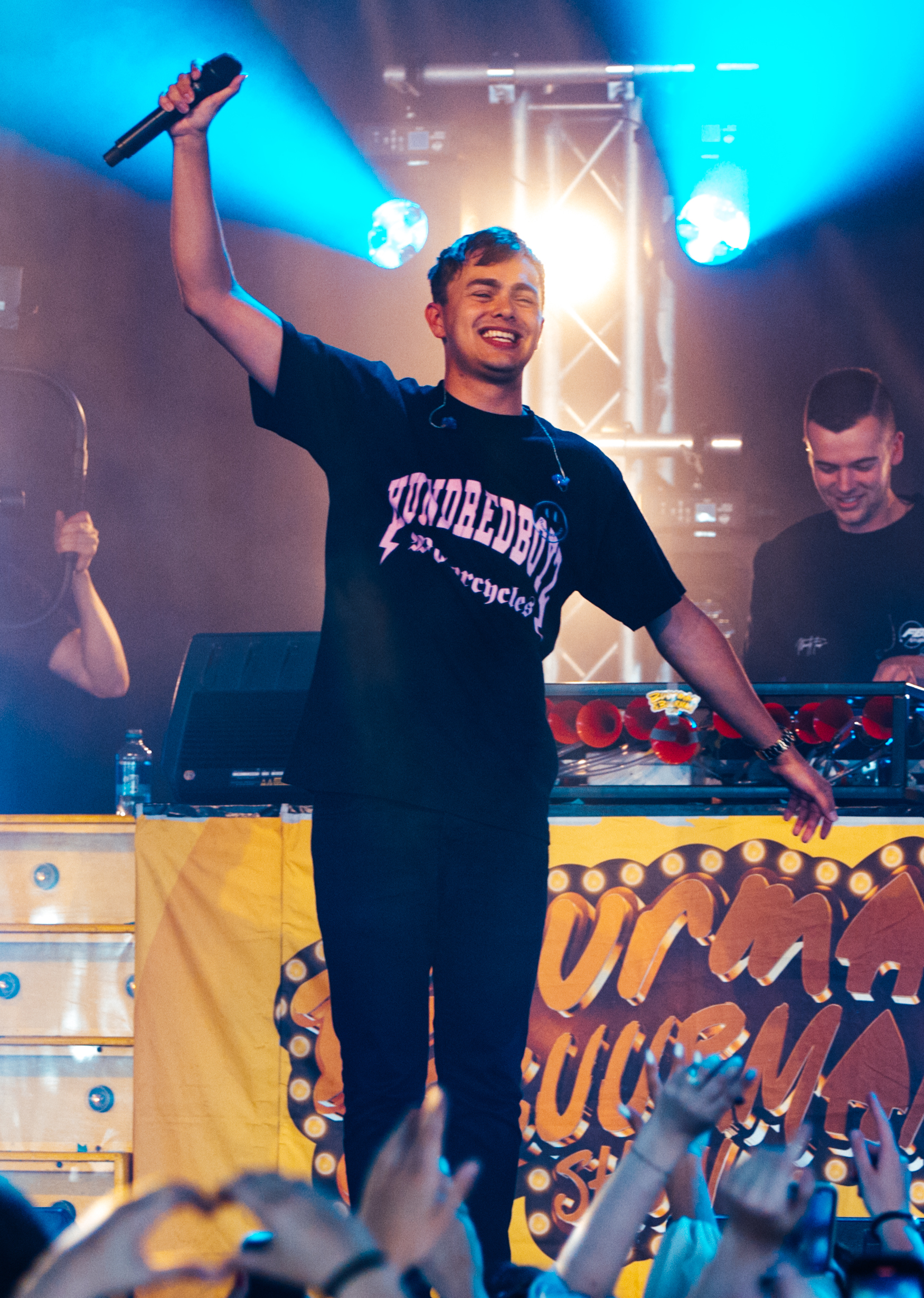
- Flemming at Hello Festival 2022

Background information
- Born: Flemming Freddie Viguurs; 5 April 1996 (age 30) 's-Hertogenbosch, Netherlands
- Genres: Pop; Nederpop
- Occupations: Musician
- Instrument: Vocals
- Years active: 2013–present
- Label: 8ball Music
- Formerly of: Baby Blue
- Website: flemmingmusic.nl

Flemming Freddie Viguurs (born 5 April 1996) is a Dutch singer-songwriter who performs mononymously under the name Flemming (occasionally stylized as FLEMMING). He is known for songs like "Automatisch" (2021) and "Amsterdam" (2022).

== Early life ==
Viguurs was born on 5 April 1996 in 's-Hertogenbosch, and named after Queen lead singer Freddie Mercury. He grew up in his birthplace and Vught and took part in several major musical productions in his youth, including Ciske de Rat (as little Ciske), Joseph and the Amazing Technicolor Dreamcoat, and Kruimeltje (as Spijker). After attending secondary school at the Elde College in Sint-Michielsgestel, Viguurs studied theatre in Eindhoven. According to himself, he was disappointed, as he preferred "to be on stage without a script". He then studied at the Rock Academy of the Fontys School of Fine and Performing Arts in Tilburg. He has stated that he was bullied during his school period.

== Career ==
=== Baby Blue ===
From 2013 to 2021, Viguurs was the lead singer of the Schijndel-based band Baby Blue. With this band, he performed more than 700 shows. Baby Blue was a cover band and played songs from "AC/DC to K3 and André Hazes". The band was successful, but Viguurs still longed to sing his own songs. He therefore went to the Rock Academy of the Fontys School of Fine and Performing Arts in Tilburg to work on his musical foundation. He taught himself to play guitar and piano via YouTube, but it was not until he attended the Rock Academy that he learned to read music. It took a while before he became successful as a solo artist. The relative success of Baby Blue ensured that he had a steady income. It was not until all performances were stopped due to the COVID-19 pandemic that Viguurs dared to give his career a different turn.

=== Solo ===
In 2015, "Digital Age" by Phreefall featuring Flemming reached the top ten of the iTunes chart. In addition to receiving widespread airplay, the song accidentally became an international line dancing hit. A year later, he participated in Giel Beelen's online talent show Giels TalentenJacht. Flemming started writing songs in English, but came to the conclusion that he could not develop himself in that language and that the songs quickly became copies, after which he decided to write songs in Dutch.

In 2021, Viguurs co-wrote the song "Miss You" by Martin Tungevaag, Sick Individuals and Marf. The song reached the 19th position in the Dutch Top 40. During the COVID-19 pandemic, he wrote about sixty Dutch-language songs, with which he was able to approach record labels. The song "Amsterdam", released in September 2021, reached the seventh position in the chart. On 26 December 2021, Viguurs performed as a guest artist during a The Streamers concert at the Winter Efteling, and on 24 September 2022, Viguurs was a one-time jury member during the final of the Junior Songfestival of AVROTROS.

On 4 November 2023, the singer released a self-titled album, his first completely in the Dutch language. This album contained the previously released singles "Amsterdam", "Zij wil mij", "Automatisch", and "Terug bij af" (featuring Ronnie Flex), as well as a collaboration with Emma Heesters, "Doodsbang". On 13 July 2023, Viguurs received a double platinum record for his single "Automatisch" and a triple platinum record for his single "Amsterdam", with which he previously achieved gold in Belgium from presenter Renze Klamer on the television program Renze. On 19 February 2024, he became the first Dutch artist ever to receive a diamond record for Flemming.

On 25 October 2024, Viguurs released his second album Twee Stappen Voor. The songs "Verleden Tijd", "Hypnose", "Champions League", "Alles Op Gevoel", "Hoop Dat Jij Me Mist", and "Onweer In M'n Hoofd" were previously released as singles. The album contains collaborations with Zoë Tauran, Ronnie Flex, and Boef.

== Discography ==
=== Studio albums ===
List of studio albums, with selected chart positions and details
Title	Details	Peak chart positions		Certifications
Title	Details	NLD	BEL (FL)	Certifications
Flemming	Released: 11 November 2022; Label: 8ball; Formats: Digital download, streaming	2	34	NVPI: Diamond
Twee stappen voor	Released: 25 October 2024; Label: 8ball; Formats: Digital download, streaming	2	86	
Samen is leuker dan alleen	Released: 16 April 2026; Label: 8ball; Formats: CD, LP, digital download, streaming	2	54	

=== Singles ===
List of singles, with selected chart positions and details
Title	Release date	Peak chart positions		Certifications	Album
Title	Release date	NLD	BEL (FL)	Certifications	Album
"Amsterdam"	24 September 2021	3	13	NVPI: 3× Platinum; BEA: Platinum	Flemming
"Zij wil mij"	31 December 2021	10	14	NVPI: Platinum; BEA: Gold	Flemming
"Automatisch"	29 April 2022	6	—	NVPI: 2× Platinum	Flemming
"Terug bij af" (featuring Ronnie Flex)	25 August 2022	27	49	NVPI: Gold	Flemming
"Plaatje van jou"	4 November 2022	94	—		Flemming
"Paracetamollen"	16 December 2022	5	—	NVPI: Platinum	Flemming
"Verleden tijd"	14 April 2023	15	—	NVPI: Gold	Twee stappen voor
"Hypnose"	14 July 2023	46	—		Twee stappen voor
"Champions League" (featuring Boef)	10 November 2023	9	—		Twee stappen voor
"Alles op gevoel" (featuring Zoë Tauran and Ronnie Flex)	5 January 2024	2	—		Twee stappen voor
"Hoop dat jij me mist"	10 May 2024	73	—		Twee stappen voor
"Onweer in m'n hoofd"	13 September 2024	88	—		Twee stappen voor
"100%" (with Mart Hoogkamer)	21 February 2025	12	—		Non-album singles
"Niet nodig" (with Metejoor)	4 December 2025	63	10		Non-album singles
"Zonder jou" (with Hardwell)	29 January 2026	94			Non-album singles
"Spiegel aan de wand" (with Radical Redemption)	27 February 2026	93		—	
