= Symphonica in Rosso =

Live album by Marco Borsato
- Released: 1 December 2006
- Recorded: 2006

Symphonica in Rosso is a cd and dvd of the Dutch singer Marco Borsato. It was recorded during his Symphonica in Rosso concerts in 2006, in the GelreDome in Arnhem.

He has sold over 160,000 DVDs and 70,000 albums.

== Track listing ==
CD1

1. "Rood" - 8:40
2. "Jij alleen" - 3:22
3. "Het water" - 5:36
4. "Italiaanse Medley" - 5:56
5. "Zij" - 4:32
6. "Ik heb genoeg aan jou" - 3:13
7. "Afscheid nemen bestaat niet" - 3:46
8. "Vrij zijn" - 4:24
9. "Dromer" - 6:07
10. "Waarom" - 5:13
11. "Because We Believe" met Andrea Bocelli - 4:47
12. "Ik leef niet meer voor jou" - 5:53

CD2

1. "Alleen" - 2:55
2. "Zeg me wie je ziet" - 3:19
3. "Wat zou je doen?" met Ali B - 3:49
4. "Je hoeft niet naar huis vannacht" - 3:08
5. "De waarheid" - 5:27
6. "De bestemming" - 3:30
7. "Dromen zijn bedrog" met Ali B & Yes-R - 6:09
8. "Als alle lichten zijn gedoofd" - 4:38
9. "Als jij maar naar me lacht" - 5:30
10. "Everytime I Think of You" met Lucie Silvas - 4:19
11. "Binnen" - 8:45

== Charts ==
=== Weekly charts ===
Chart (2006–2007)	Peak position
Belgian Albums (Ultratop Flanders)	1
Dutch Albums (Album Top 100)	1

=== Year-end charts ===
Chart (2006)	Position
Belgian Albums (Ultratop Flanders)	60
Dutch Albums (Album Top 100)	11
Chart (2007)	Position
Belgian Albums (Ultratop Flanders)	12
Dutch Albums (Album Top 100)	17
