= Emozioni (Marco Borsato album) =

Studio album by Marco Borsato
- Released: 3 March 1990
- Length: 51:36
- Label: Polydor Records

Marco Borsato chronology
| Emozioni (1990) | Sento (1991) |

Singles from Emozioni
- 1. "Emozioni / At This Moment" Released: 7 April 1990; 2. "Una donna cosi" Released: 4 October 1990

Emozioni is the debut studio album by Dutch artist Marco Borsato. It was released on 3 March 1990 through Polydor Records.

== Track listing ==
| No. | Title | Length |
|---|---|---|
| 1. | "Una donna cosi" | 4:36 |
| 2. | "Tell Me Why" | 3:14 |
| 3. | "Santí' nel viavai" | 4:28 |
| 4. | "Emozioni" | 3:40 |
| 5. | "You" | 3:54 |
| 6. | "Barricade of Love" | 3:26 |
| 7. | "Io perdo te" | 4:05 |
| 8. | "Take Good Care" | 3:54 |
| 9. | "You're the Reason Why" | 3:41 |
| 10. | "Raggio di sole" | 2:58 |
| 11. | "As Love Begins" | 4:02 |
| 12. | "At This Moment" | 3:40 |
| 13. | "A Lady Like You" | 4:37 |
| 14. | "Thanks" | 1:07 |
| Total length: | | 51:36 |

== Charts ==
| Chart (1990) | Peak position |
|---|---|
| Dutch Albums (Album Top 100) | 78 |
