= Als geen ander =

Studio album by Marco Borsato
- Released: 1995
- Genre: Pop
- Length: 46:25
- Label: Polydor

Marco Borsato chronology
Marco (1994)	Als geen ander (1995)	De Waarheid (1996)

Als geen ander is the fifth album by Dutch singer Marco Borsato, released in 1995 by Polydor.

== Track listing ==
1. Vrij Zijn (3:58)
2. Zonder Jou (4:14)
3. De Wens (4:20)
4. Ik Leef Niet Meer voor Jou (3:36)
5. Kom Maar bij Mij (4:22)
6. Niemand (3:47)
7. Als M'n Hoofd M'n Hart Vertrouwt (2:17)
8. Iemand Zoals Jij (3:29)
9. Je Hoeft Niet Naar Huis Vannacht (3:27)
10. Margherita (4:10)
11. Stapel op Jou (4:07)
12. Als Jij Maar Naar Me Lacht (4:39)

== Charts ==
=== Weekly charts ===
Chart (1995)	Peak position
Belgian Albums (Ultratop Flanders)	9
Dutch Albums (Album Top 100)	1

=== Year-end charts ===
Chart (1995)	Position
Dutch Albums (Album Top 100)	16
Chart (1996)	Position
Dutch Albums (Album Top 100)	2
Chart (1997)	Position
Dutch Albums (Album Top 100)	21
Chart (1998)	Position
Dutch Albums (Album Top 100)	71
