= Marco Borsato =

Dutch singer (born 1966)

- Borsato in 2016

Background information
- Born: Marco Roberto Borsato; 21 December 1966 (age 59); Alkmaar, Netherlands
- Genre: Nederpop
- Occupations: Singer; musician
- Instrument: Vocals
- Years active: 1990–2021
- Labels: Universal, Polydor
- Spouse: Leontine Ruiters (m. 1998; div. 2020)
- Website: www.borsato.nl

Marco Roberto Borsato (Dutch: [ˈmɑrkoː roːˈbɛrtoː bɔrˈsaːtoː], Italian: [ˈmarko roˈbɛrto borˈsaːto]; born 21 December 1966) is a Dutch former singer. Born in Alkmaar, North Holland, he started performing in Italian before switching to Dutch in 1994. He is one of the most successful and best-selling musicians of all time in the Netherlands and Belgium.

Borsato achieved 15 number-one singles in the Netherlands, the second-most all-time behind The Beatles' 16. In 1994, his song "Dromen zijn bedrog" spent a then-record 12 weeks at number one, a feat which stood for 17 years. It still remains the longest-running Dutch language number-one song ever. Between 2003 and 2008, Borsato became the first artist to record nine consecutive number-one singles on the Dutch charts. He is the most successful Dutch artist of all time according to the Dutch Top 40, and was the most successful overall male artist in the history of the chart for over a decade.

Borsato also has recorded 11 number-one albums in the Netherlands, all certified at least Platinum, with every eligible studio album of his from 1995 to 2013 debuting at number one on the Dutch album charts. Borsato also has six number-one albums in Belgium.

From 2021, Borsato was publicly accused of sexually abusing several minors, including allegations relating to the Voice of Holland scandal, leading to his music being banned by Dutch radio stations amid other public backlash. He was charged with child sexual abuse in September 2023, and acquitted in December 2025 due to lack of supporting evidence.

== Early life ==
Marco Roberto Borsato was born in the Wilhelmina Hospital in Alkmaar as the son of Roberto Borsato and Mary de Graaf. He has a brother, Armando, and a sister, Sylvana. His father is Italian and after their divorce, the family moved to Italy, where the father started a restaurant in Garda. Borsato spent a significant amount of time in Italy and speaks fluent Italian.

When Borsato was twelve years old, he decided he wanted to be a sushi chef. Borsato, though brought up with Italian cuisine, felt a great love for this cuisine. When he was older, he went to school during the week and worked in a restaurant during the weekends. During his conscription, he was bound to the cavalry, where he was conscripted as a NCO.

== Career ==
Borsato's career as a musician debuted in 1990, when he won the Dutch talent show Soundmixshow hosted by Henny Huisman with his rendition of Billy Vera's "At This Moment." At the time, he was still working as a chef. The accomplishment allowed him to sign a record deal, where he released three albums sung in the Italian language: Emozioni, Sento and Giorno per giorno (excluding the track Opa which is the only Dutch-language song in the album, also a Dutch version of the track A mio nonno).

=== Breakthrough ===
Borsato earned newfound popularity in 1994, when he began to sing songs in Dutch, as recommended by his songwriting partner John Ewbank. His first Dutch-language single "Dromen Zijn Bedrog" ("Dreams Are Deceptive”) reached number one in the Netherlands and stayed there for 12 weeks, selling over 240,000 copies. It broke the record for longest time spent at number one on the Dutch chart. Borsato held the record until 2011, when "Balada" by Gusttavo Lima spent 13 weeks at number one. His second single "Waarom Nou Jij" also reached number one on the Dutch Top 40.

His fifth album Als geen ander, released in 1995, was certified 4× Platinum and became his first number-one album in the Netherlands. It produced four singles, three of which reached the top ten in the Netherlands. Many of its songs were Dutch-language covers of songs originally song in Italian.

In 1997, Borsato released De waarheid, which also debuted at number one in the Netherlands and stayed there for seven weeks. It would be certified 6× Platinum. The album sold around 275,000 copies in its first day. By the end of the year, it was reported to have sold over 700,000 copies, while 530,000 copies of Als geen ander were also sold that year.

His seventh album De bestemming followed shortly after in 1998, debuting at number one in the Netherlands and staying there for four weeks. It is certified 5× Platinum. The album's title track became his third number one single on the Dutch Top 40. "Binnen", the lead single to Borsato's eighth album Luid en duidelijk, reached number one in 1999, and the album came out in early 2000, to another number-one debut and eight weeks atop the albums chart. It is certified 5× Platinum.

=== Chart dominance in the 2000s ===
After a short period of silence, "Lopen op het water", the lead single to Borsato's greatest hits album Onderweg, became his fifth number-one single in January 2002. It is a collaboration with Sita Vermuelen and a Dutch-language adaptation of Troy Verges & Hillary Lindsey's "This Mystery". It was released to commemorate the wedding of Prince Willem-Alexander and Princess Maxima.

Beginning in 2003, with "Afscheid nemen bestaat niet" and ending in 2008 with "Dochters", Borsato recorded nine consecutive number-one singles on the Dutch singles charts, an accomplishment which remains unmatched to this day.

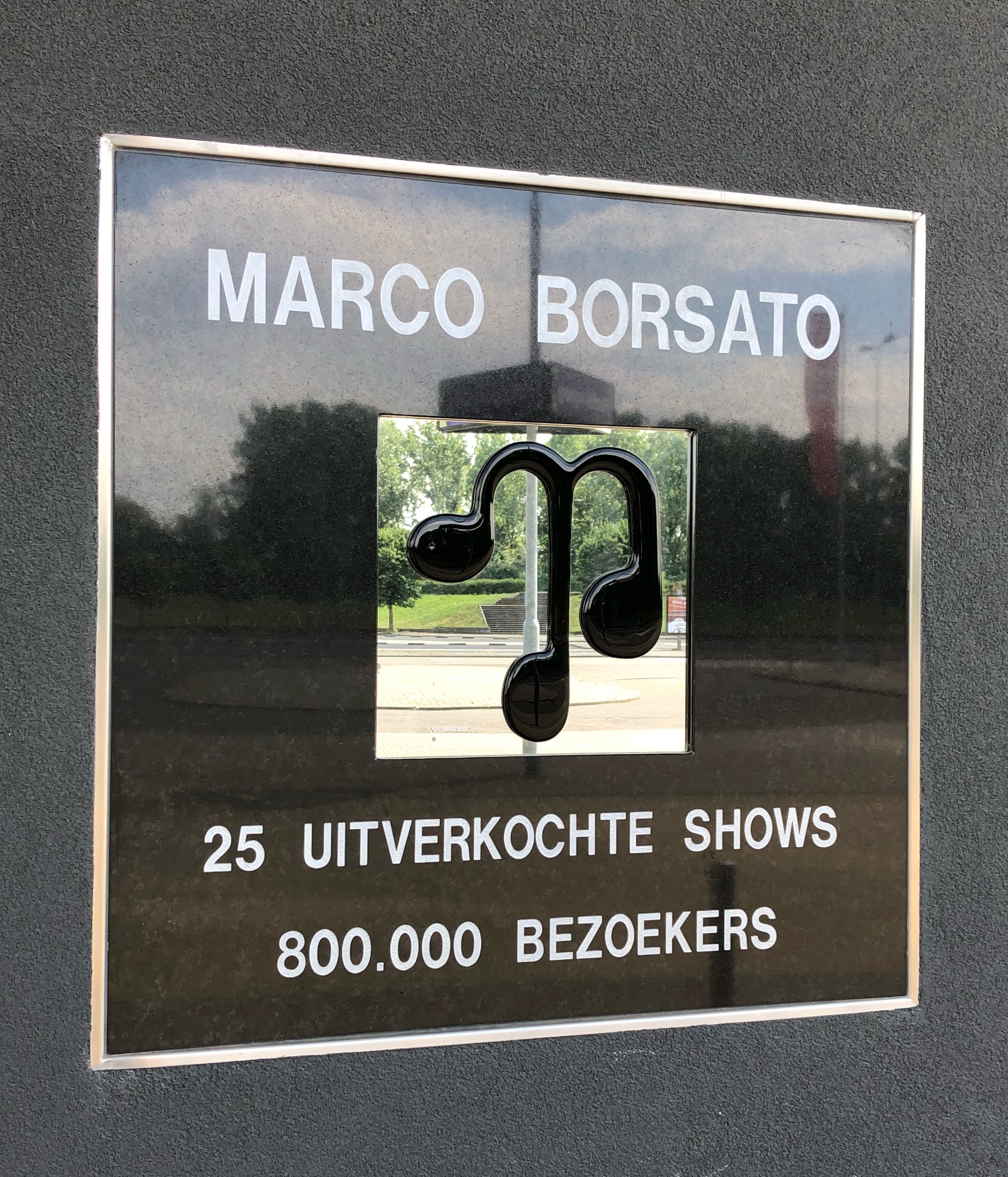
Borsato sold out Arnhem's GelreDome 25 times

Borsato's ninth album Zien was released in 2004 on DVD only and was certified 4× Platinum. It produced three number-one singles, including "Wat zou je doen?" featuring Dutch rapper Ali B. In May and June 2005, Borsato sold out the Antwerp Sportpaleis ten times, a feat unmatched by any other Dutchman in Belgium.

In January 2005, Borsato participated in Artiesten voor Azië, a charity music project to raise funds in relief of the 2004 Indian Ocean earthquake and tsunami. The song they recorded, "Als je iets kan doen", was an immediate number-one hit.

In December 2006, Borsato released a live album, Symphonica in Rosso, which also saw all three of its singles reach number one in the Netherlands. This included a cover of "Because We Believe" featuring Andrea Bocelli and "Every Time I Think of You" featuring British singer-songwriter Lucie Silvas. The album debuted at number one in the Netherlands and stayed at its peak for one week, being certified 5× Platinum. The live album documented his ten concerts at Arnhem's GelreDome a few weeks prior to the release.

His tenth album Wit licht came out in 2008 and debuted at number one in the Netherlands, remaining there for six non-consecutive weeks. All three of its singles, the title track, "Stop de tijd" and "Dochters", reached number one, giving Borsato 14 career number-one singles and nine consecutive.

In 2009, Borsato was dealt a financial blow when his company The Entertainment Group, a major events organiser and Dutch artists representer, was declared bankrupt by a Dutch court.

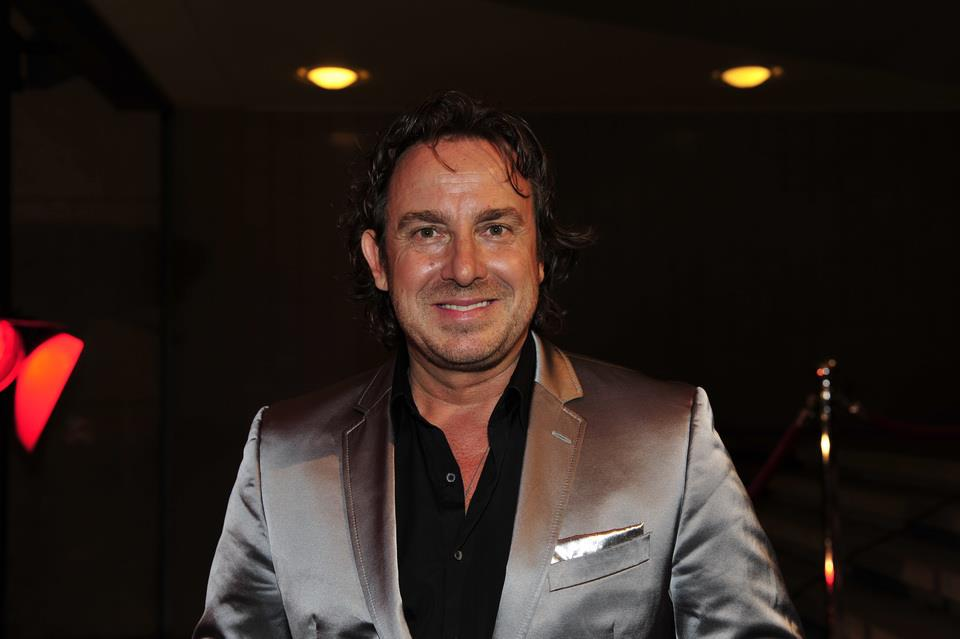
Borsato in 2011

Borsato's eleventh album Dromen durven delen was released in 2010 to another number-one debut and five weeks on top. However, its lead single "Schouder aan schouder" with Guus Meeuwis only peaked at No. 2, and its follow-ups at No. 9, No. 11, No. 29 and No. 29. In 2013, Borsato sang in "Koningslied", a song written by longtime songwriting partner John Ewbank to commemorate the succession of King Willem-Alexander to the throne. His twelfth album Duizend spiegels was released on 22 November 2013. It was number one for six weeks and produced two top-ten singles. Despite having only four weeks of sales, it became the best-selling album in the Netherlands for the entire year of 2013.

His thirteenth studio album Evenwicht was released in November 2015. It peaked at No. 2 behind Adele's 25, the first time since Marco in 1994 that a Borsato studio album did not debut at number one in the Netherlands. Still, in just four weeks, it was the second-best selling album of 2015 in the Netherlands.

Between 23 October 2015 to 3 March 2016, Borsato performed 12 sold-out "Symphonica in Rosso" concerts at the Ziggo Dome in Amsterdam, performing to a total of over 180,000 people. It was a sequel to his series of ten Symphonica in Rosso concerts that he performed in 2006 at the GelreDome in Arnhem.

The lead single and title track of his fourteenth album Thuis only peaked at No. 27 on the Dutch Top 40 in 2017, but the album became his eleventh number-one in the Netherlands. It was the seventh-best selling album of 2017 in the Netherlands.

=== Resurgence, burnout and scandal ===
In 2019, Borsato released the single "Hoe het danst" with Dutch DJ Armin van Buuren and singer Davina Michelle. It became his first number-one song in 11 years and the fifteenth number-one single on the Dutch Top 40 in his career. It was also the 21st single of his to reach the top three in the Netherlands, extending his record over the Beatles' 19 for the most in chart history. "Hoe het danst" was named the biggest chart hit of 2019 by the Dutch Top 40.

In May and June 2019, Borsato performed five concerts at De Kuip in Rotterdam. It was the first time he played at the stadium in 15 years. With these, his number of concerts at De Kuip increased to 14, breaking The Rolling Stones' previous venue record of 10. Borsato scored the 40th top 40 hit of his career with "Lippenstift" in October 2019, making him the seventh musical act to accomplish so.

In January 2020, Borsato announced an indefinite professional hiatus because of burnout, including the cancellation of several planned large concerts for the year and a full duets album, which would have featured "Hoe het danst". He returned from his silence in March 2021 with the single "Een moment" featuring Rolf Sanchez and John Ewbank, inspired by Borsato's recent divorce. In December 2021, Borsato cancelled a scheduled tour amidst allegations of inappropriate sexual contact with minors during barbecues he held for his The Voice Kids contestants.

Following the allegations, Borsato became a recluse and rarely made any public appearances. During his child sex abuse trial in October 2025, Borsato said that the chances of him resuming his career were virtually nonexistent. "Even if the court were to acquit me, I don't know if I'll ever be able to sing a single note again." After his acquittal in December 2025, André Rieu asked Borsato to perform together next summer, but Borsato's management said that he would not do live shows in 2026.

== Other functions ==
Borsato was an ambassador of the Dutch NGO War Child, which helps children in post-conflict areas to cope with their war experiences, beginning in 1998. In February 2004, he traveled to Afghanistan as an ambassador and held an official meeting with Afghani president Hamid Karzai. That year, he also recorded the number-one single "Wat zou je doen" with Dutch rapper Ali B, donating all proceeds from the single to War Child. He resigned from his role as War Child's ambassador on 14 December 2021 after being accused of sexually assaulting minors.

In 2011, he became a judge on the Dutch talent show The Voice of Holland and The Voice Kids. He left his role as judge on The Voice of Holland in 2016. In 2018 and 2019, he was a judge on The Voice Senior. In 2020, Borsato announced that he would resign as a judge on The Voice Kids because of professional burnout.

== Child sex abuse trial ==
On 13 December 2021, a 22-year-old Dutch woman filed charges against Borsato with the police, accusing Borsato of grooming and sexually assaulting her from 2014 to 2019, beginning when she was 15, by groping her genitals, buttocks and breasts against her will. The victim was Borsato's goddaughter and sought emotional comfort in Borsato after the recent death of her own father. In the following days, two more women accused Borsato of sexual abuse. In September 2023, Borsato was charged with child sexual abuse for groping and molesting the first victim, which continued until her mother read her diary and confronted Borsato.

Borsato's trial began in Utrecht on 28 October 2025. It was learned that the victim's mother was the chair for Borsato's fan club. Her mother secretly recorded a conversation with Borsato after discovering the victim's diary, in which he did not refute the allegations. The victim also accused Borsato of forcing her to touch his penis, but as she was 17 at the time and above the age of consent, this claim was not included in the trial. In court, Borsato admitted to touching and even spanking the victim, but denied any sexual intent. He also admitted to buying her lingerie, but said that the family had a sexually open household to the point that the mother would play Borsato audio clips of her daughter having sex with other boys. Borsato counter-reported the victim for libel and slander and her mother for entrapment and complicity. The singer claims the mother reported him out of spite but has not revealed her alleged motivation. The Public Prosecution Service demanded a five-month prison sentence for Borsato, declaring that "sexual abuse is never a child's fault."

On 4 December, Borsato was found not guilty, with judges saying there is not enough evidence for a conviction. According to the law, an accusation cannot be proven solely on the basis of the statement of one alleged victim. There must always be third-party evidence (proof of support). Thus, the diary does not provide enough evidence of when, how and where Borsato is alleged to have touched her, while touching a person's buttocks above the clothing is not legally considered indecent assault.

=== Other allegations ===
As early as 2020, Borsato asked Knoops' Advocaten to investigate the spread of rumors about his sexual misconduct with underage girls. This was publicized in December 2021, when the media began to report that Borsato may have committed sexual abuse during barbecues that he organized for the contestants who chose him as a coach in The Voice of Holland and The Voice Kids.

On 20 January 2022, a report by Dutch online investigative show BOOS accused Borsato of inappropriately touching six contestants, three of whom were underage, while he was a judge on The Voice Kids. The victims included girls aged 13 and 14. In one of the alleged incidents, Borsato groped a 14-year-old girl's buttocks during a professional barbecue he held for The Voice Kids. The three underage victims claimed that Borsato "mainly touched their buttocks unsolicited and for a long time in work spheres." In March 2023, the Central Netherlands Public Prosecution Service did not prosecute Borsato for this due to lack of evidence.

Following the BOOS report, Borsato's music was banned from radio stations operated by NPO, Talpa and Qmusic. His wax figure at the Madame Tussauds Amsterdam museum was also removed.

Borsato and fellow judge Ali B were rumored to have had sex with his The Voice contestant Maan de Steenwinkel. After the BOOS report, Maan had to issue a public statement denying that she had sex with Borsato.

In a July 2022 podcast interview, Brazilian singer Fantine Thó also accused Borsato of sexual assault while he was her coach during her participation on The Voice of Holland in 2013. She claimed that he groped her buttocks and kissed her on the mouth backstage, and the trauma led her to cry during rehearsals in front of many people. She claimed that Borsato eliminated her from the competition despite his original plans to name her as a finalist, because Borsato saw her as "drama".

== Personal life ==
Borsato married Dutch TV personality Leontine Ruiters in 1998. They have three children together: Luca (b. 1998), Senna (b. 2001), and Jada (b. 2002). In February 2020, the couple announced their divorce after 22 years of marriage. In 2019, it was revealed that Borsato had an extramarital affair with Dutch pianist Iris Hond in 2009. In a 2021 interview with television presenter Linda de Mol, Borsato said that he frequently cheated on Ruiters because of an "intimacy vacuum" in their relationship.

In 2006, the Quote 500 estimated Borsato's net worth at €29 million, making him the wealthiest singer in the Netherlands at the time. In 2009, Borsato claimed to have lost all his fortune after the bankruptcy of The Entertainment Group, the artist agency he co-owned and also contracted himself to. In 2010, it was revealed that Borsato concealed €8 million of income in a Curaçao bank account for tax evasion purposes, and he paid a settlement of €2 million to the Dutch tax authorities in 2007.

In 2019, Musica è, Borsato's main company, was valued at €8.9 million. Borsato's burnout and the COVID-19 pandemic dropped its worth to €6 million in 2020. By 2024, it dropped even more to €4.7 million.

Before being accused of serial sexual assault, Borsato earned a reputation as "the ideal son-in-law" because of his smaller stature and history of kind behavior to employees and fans.

Borsato purchased his current residence in 2020, an Alkmaar penthouse that was formerly a church.

== Awards and honours ==
=== Honours ===
- 2004: Officer of the Order of Orange-Nassau, for services to Dutch music and his dedication to War Child Netherlands

=== Awards ===
- 1996 – 2006: Won a TMF Award, eleven times for best Dutch singer (In 2006, he joined Anouk in announcing their withdrawal from future TMF Awards-nominations. "Every year the same faces can get boring".)
- 1997: Edison Award, two times (Best Singer, Best Single of the Year)
- 1999: Golden Harp (with John Ewbank)
- 2000: Hitkrant Award, for the song Binnen ("Inside")
- 2000: Honorary Award for Best Album (Luid en Duidelijk ("Loud and Clear")) and Best Singer
- 2001: Edison Award (Best Singer)
- 2010: Twitteraar van het Jaar (Best Twitter user)

== Discography ==
- Emozioni (1990)
- Sento (1991)
- Giorno per giorno (1992)
- Marco (1994)
- Als geen ander (1995)
- De waarheid (1997)
- De bestemming (1998)
- Luid en duidelijk (2000)
- Onderweg (2002)
- Zien (2004)
- Symphonica in Rosso - Live CD (2006)
- Wit licht (2008)
- Dromen durven delen (2010)
- Duizend spiegels (2013)
- Evenwicht (2015)
- Thuis (2017)
