= Emma Heesters =

Dutch singer (born 1996)

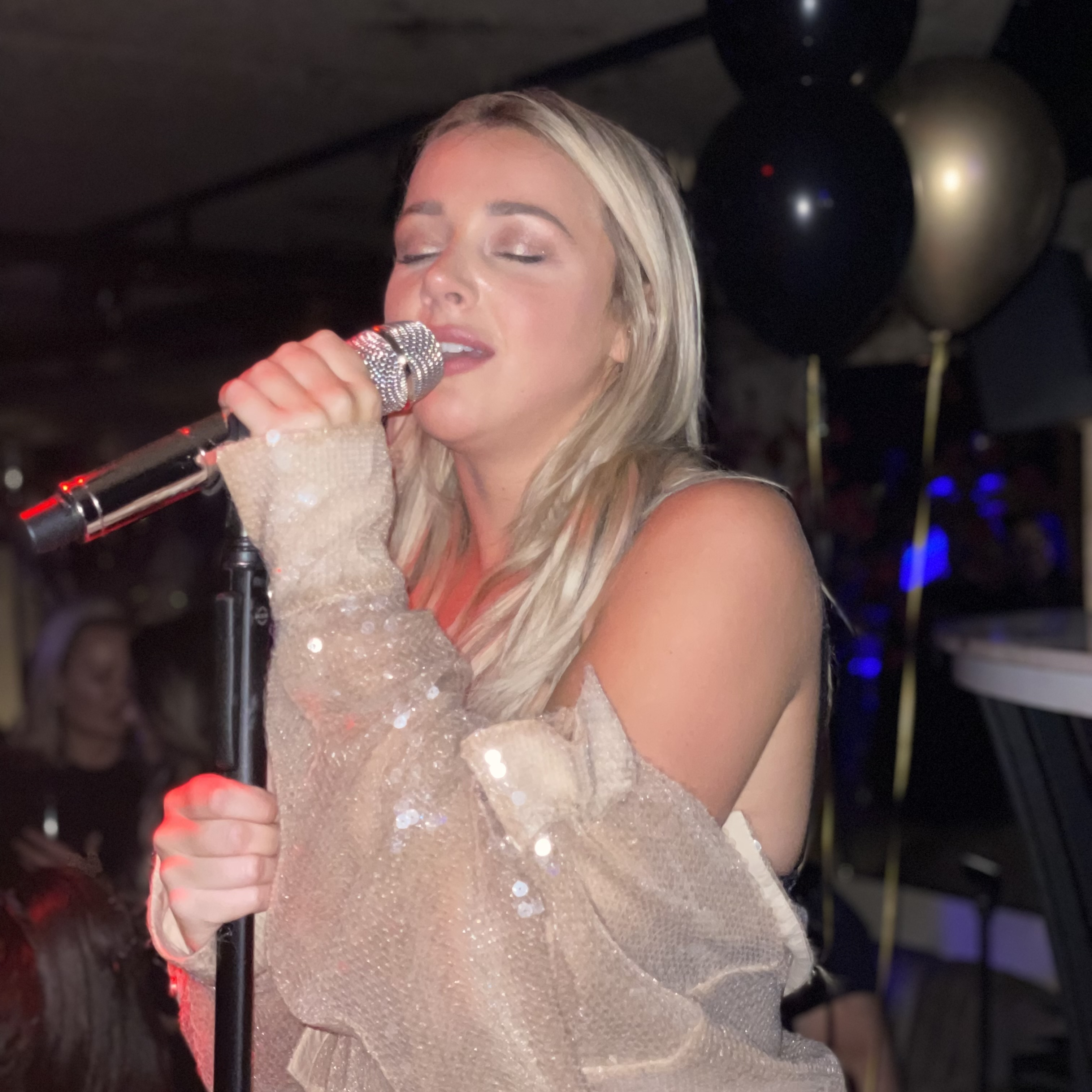
- Heesters in 2022
- Born: 8 January 1996 (age 30) 's-Gravenpolder, Netherlands
- Occupations: Singer; songwriter; model
- Years active: 2017–present
- Height: 169 cm (5 ft 7 in)
- Musical career
- Genres: Pop; World
- Instrument: Vocal
- Labels: Republic; Universal Music Group; Eddie O Entertainment; Hello Music (a division of The Hello Group); Sony Music Belgium; Sony Music Netherlands
- Website: emmaheesters.com

Emma Heesters (born 8 January 1996) (pronunciation: emā hīsṭars) is a Dutch singer and television personality, mainly known for performing covers of popular songs on her own YouTube channel. She began her music career in 2014 and as of August 2022 has over 5.77 million subscribers on YouTube.

== Early life ==
Heesters was born in the village of 's-Gravenpolder in the province of Zeeland as the child of Ludo and Willian Heesters. From a young age, she started vocal and dance lessons, including ballet. In 2004, at the age of 8, she won the provincial preselection of the Kinderen voor Kinderen Songfestival. Shortly before the performance, Heesters had broken her leg, having to sit in a wheelchair while singing. As a result, she had a television debut on the eponymous show on NPO Zapp, where she performed "100 kleine feestjes". Later on, she acted in a few musicals as a child star. During her teen years, she started singing as part of numerous cover bands, which she stopped doing once she graduated school. In 2013, she graduated from the Dalton Plan school Roncalli in Bergen op Zoom with a havo certificate, specialising in the economy and society profile.

== Career ==
In 2019 she was the first Dutch winner of MTV's Push Award and gained Platinum status for her single "Pa Olvidarte" with Rolf Sanchez, she featured in a song by the band Boyce Avenue plus collaborated with them on their European tour, and took to television performing in Beste Zangers a Dutch television program, the web series Jachtseizoen ("Hunting Season") of the channel StukTV, and the game show, I Can See Your Voice.

Heesters was named by Top40 NL as the most successful Dutch artist of the year so far in 2020 and later in November was named winner of MTV EMA's Best Dutch Act.

In March 2025 it was revealed that she will be one of the four coaches in the eleventh season of The Voice Kids, which began airing in November 2026.

== Personal life ==
She was diagnosed with cervical cancer in October 2024. In July 2025 she announced via Instagram that she is better now. Her conversation with Eva Jinek in the Eva talk show about her cancer diagnosis won the Televizier-Ring Impact award at the 2025 Gouden Televizier-Ring Gala.

== Discography ==
=== Singles ===
==== As lead artist ====
List of singles as lead artist, with selected peak chart positions and certifications
Title	Year	Peak chart positions			Certification
Title	Year	NLD Top 40	NLD 100	BEL (FL)	Certification
Pa Olvidarte (with Rolf Sanchez)	2019	2	2	—	NVPI: Diamond
Loop Niet Weg (with Kris Kross Amsterdam)	2020	4	3	—	NVPI: 2 x Platinum
Waar Ga Je Heen	2020	12	21	—	NVPI: Gold
Donderdag (with Kris Kross Amsterdam)	2020	29	37	—	NVPI: Gold
Als De Eerste Sneeuw Valt	2020	—	—	—	
Schat Ik Ben OK	2021	—	—	—	NVPI: Gold
Alles Wat Ik Mis (with Ronnie Flex)	2021	7	1	—	NVPI: Platinum
Rendez-Vous (with Metejoor)	2021	—	—	4	NVPI: Gold BRMA: Platinum
Meisje zonder naam (with Ronnie Flex & Trobi)	2021	—	56	—	
Zwaartekracht (with Regi)	2022	—	—	7	BRMA: Platinum
HJB (with Maks)	2023	—	50	—	NVPI: Gold
Dat Hadden Wij Moeten Zijn (with Maksim)	2023	—	—	7	
Haat Me	2024	—	—	—	
Contigo (with Rolf Sanchez)	2024	10	22	—	NVPI: Gold
Alleen Met Jou (with Yves Berendse)	2024	11	9	—	NVPI: Platinum
Kerst Zonder Jou (with Snelle)	2024	—	86	—	
Alles Wordt Beter	2025	11	17	—	NVPI: Gold
Levenslang	2025	—	—	—	
Meisje Uit De Klas	2025	—	—	—	
Liefdesverdriet (with Russo)	2026	—	53	—	
Hartenbreker	2026	—	—	—	
"—" denotes a recording that did not chart or was not released in that territory.

=== Cover songs ===
Year	Songs	Lyricist	Original singer
2016	"Let Me Love You"	Justin Bieber	DJ Snake
2017	"Shape of You"	Ed Sheeran	Ed Sheeran
2017	"Despacito"	Luis Fonsi	Luis Fonsi
2017	"Perfect"	Ed Sheeran	Ed Sheeran
2018	"Girls Like You"	Maroon 5	Maroon 5
2019	"Hanya Rindu"	Andmesh Kamaleng	Andmesh Kamaleng
2019	"Taki Taki"	DJ Snake	DJ Snake
2019	"Pa' Olvidarte"	ChocQuibTown	ChocQuibTown
2020	"Kaun Tujhe" (English)	Emma Heesters	Emma Heesters
2020	"Pura Pura Lupa"	Mahen	Mahen
2020	"Shayad"	Irshad Kamil	Arijit Singh
2020	"Titliaan"	Jaani	Afsana Khan
2020	"Shona Shona"	Tony Kakkar	Tony Kakkar
2021	"Satisfya"	Imran Khan	Imran Khan
2021	"Enjoy Enjaami"	Arivu	Dhee and Santhosh Narayanan
2021	"Easy on Me"	Adele	Adele
2021	"Bijlee Bijlee"	Jaani	Hardy Sandhu
2022	"Pasoori"	Ali Sethi	Ali Sethi and Shae Gill
	"Srivalli" (English)	Chandrabose	Sid Sriram
2023	"Tere Vaaste"	Jigar and Varun Jain	Jigar and Varun Jain
