= Snelle discography =

Cataloguing of published recordings by Avril Lavigne

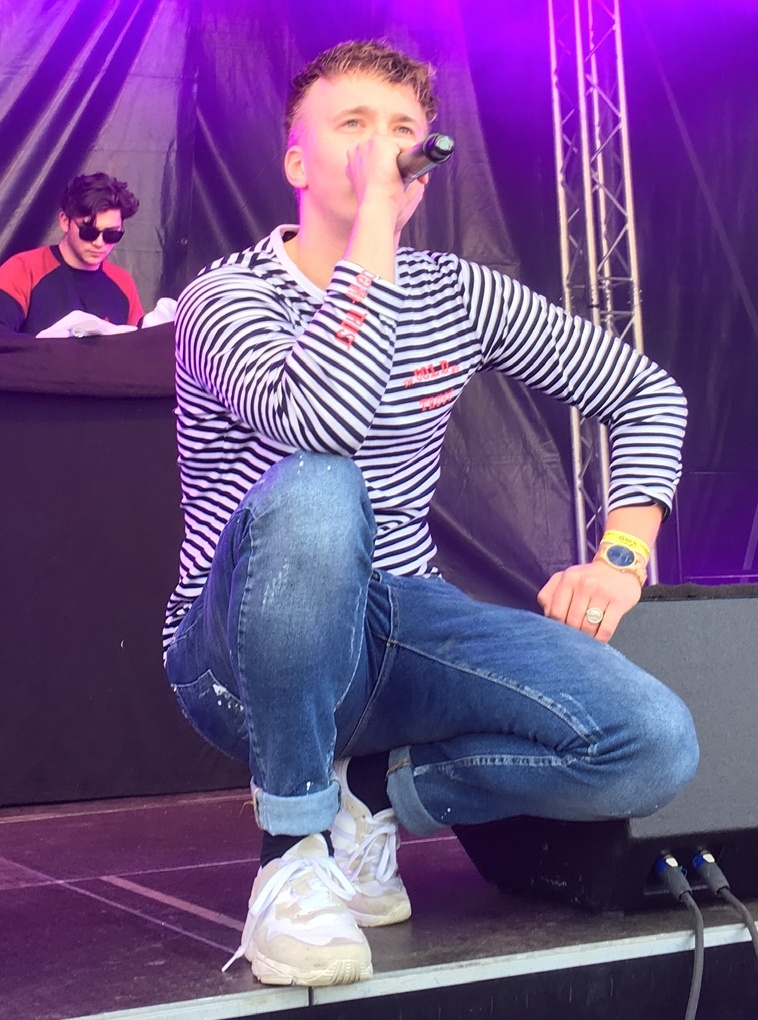
- Snelle performing in concert (2019)
- Studio albums: 5
- EPs: 2
- Singles: 24
- Music videos: 24

The discography of Dutch rapper and singer Snelle consists of five studio albums, two extended plays (EPs), 24 singles and one featured song.

== Discography ==
=== Albums ===
List of studio albums, with selected chart positions
Title	Year	Peak chart positions	
Title	Year	NLD	BEL (Fl)
Lieve jongens	2018	34	—
Beetje bij beetje	2019	2	42
Vierentwintig	2019	1	11
Lars	2021	1	4
Achtentwintig	2023	4	24

=== EPs ===
List of EPs, with selected chart positions
Title	Year	Peak chart positions	
Title	Year	NLD	BEL (Fl)
Twee van vierentwintig	2019	—	—
1/3	2022	20	198

=== Singles ===
List of singles or releases, with selected chart positions
Title	Year	Peak chart positions			Album
Title	Year	NLD Top 40	NLD Single Top 100	BEL (Fl)	Album
"Scars"	2019	22	4	Tip	Beetje bij beetje
"Plankgas" (with Frenna)	2019	18	6	Tip	Vierentwintig
"Reünie"	2019	1	1	6	Vierentwintig
"Lippenstift" (with Marco Borsato & John Ewbank)	2019	2	2	15	Vierentwintig
"Smoorverliefd"	2020	1	1	2	Lars
"17 miljoen mensen" (with Davina Michelle)	2020	1	1	—	Non-album single
"Kleur"	2020	7	4	—	Lars
"De overkant" (with Suzan & Freek)	2020	2	6	11	Lars
"In de schuur" (with Ronnie Flex)	2020	12	10	—	Lars
"Papa heeft weer wat gelezen" (with Thomas Acda)	2020	39	53	—	Lars
"Blijven slapen" (with Maan)	2021	1	1	17	Lars
"In m'n bloed"	2021	14	22	—	Lars
"Kijk ons nou" (with Metejoor)	2022	—	—	3	Non-album single
"5 voor 12"	2022	23	58	—	Achtentwintig
"Terugweg"	2023	27	34	48	Achtentwintig
"Alles al" (with Jonna Fraser)	2023	—	51	—	Achtentwintig
"Ruggengraat" (with Kraantje Pappie)	2023	32	29	—	Achtentwintig
"Radio"	2023	39	41	29	Achtentwintig
"Hoodiedate"	2023	38	57	—	Achtentwintig
"Rock 'n Roll in Nederland" (with Thomas Acda)	2023	—	60	—	Achtentwintig
"Op jou heb ik gewacht" (with De Poema's)	2025	36	—	—	Non-album singles
"Ik zing" (with Zoë Livay)	2025	4	9	—	Non-album singles
"'k heb je lief"	2025	—	65	—	Non-album singles
"Laat het licht aan"	2026	18	44	—	Non-album singles

=== Featured in ===
List of singles or releases, with selected chart positions
Title	Year	Peak chart positions	Album
Title	Year	NLD	Album
"Tranen in de studio" (Philly Moré feat. Snelle)	2019	27	Non-album single

=== Other charted songs ===
List of songs, with selected chart positions
Title	Year	Peak chart positions		Album
Title	Year	NLD	BEL (Fl)	Album
"Eredivisie"	2019	24	—	Beetje bij beetje
"Kibbelingkraam"	2019	42	—	Beetje bij beetje
"Niet Safe"	2019	66	—	Beetje bij beetje
"Wel varen"	2019	88	—	Beetje bij beetje
"Samen"	2019	27	—	non-album songs
"Non verbaal" (with F1rstman)	2019	75	—	non-album songs
"Nodig"	2019	Tip	—	non-album songs
"Ze kent mij" (with Yade Lauren)	2019	5	Tip29	Vierentwintig
"Voor je deur"	2019	3	—	Vierentwintig
"Kapitein"	2019	30	—	Vierentwintig
"Hoofd omhoog" (with Jebroer)	2019	8	—	Vierentwintig
"Vaarwater"	2019	31	—	Vierentwintig
"Dwars door me heen"	2019	18	—	Vierentwintig
"Op zoek naar Life" (with Kraantje Pappie)	2019	28	—	Vierentwintig
"Nog steeds"	2019	34	—	Vierentwintig
"Hometown" (with Hef and Kevin)	2019	10	—	Vierentwintig
"Goeie fles wijn"	2019	33	—	Vierentwintig
"Lang geleden" (with Emms)	2019	22	—	Vierentwintig
"Niks mee te maken"	2022	46	—	1/3
"Pizza met ananas"	2022	68	47	1/3
