= List of Dutch Top 40 number-one singles of 2020 =

This is a list of the Dutch Top 40 number-one singles of 2020. The Dutch Top 40 is a chart that ranks the best-performing singles of the Netherlands. It is published every week by radio station Qmusic.

== Chart history ==
Issue date	Song	Artist(s)	Ref.
January 4	"Dance Monkey"	Tones and I	
January 11	"Dance Monkey"	Tones and I	
January 18	"Blinding Lights"	The Weeknd	
January 25	"Smoorverliefd"	Snelle	
February 1	"Smoorverliefd"	Snelle	
February 8	"Smoorverliefd"	Snelle	
February 15	"Blinding Lights"	The Weeknd	
February 22	"Blinding Lights"	The Weeknd	
February 29	"Blinding Lights"	The Weeknd	
March 7	"Blinding Lights"	The Weeknd	
March 14	"Blinding Lights"	The Weeknd	
March 21	"Blinding Lights"	The Weeknd	
March 28	"Blinding Lights"	The Weeknd	
April 4	"17 miljoen mensen"	Davina Michelle and Snelle	
April 11	"17 miljoen mensen"	Davina Michelle and Snelle	
April 18	"17 miljoen mensen"	Davina Michelle and Snelle	
April 25	"17 miljoen mensen"	Davina Michelle and Snelle	
May 2	"Blinding Lights"	The Weeknd	
May 9	"Blinding Lights"	The Weeknd	
May 16	"Blinding Lights"	The Weeknd	
May 23	"Blinding Lights"	The Weeknd	
May 30	"Blinding Lights"	The Weeknd	
June 6	"Blinding Lights"	The Weeknd	
June 13	"Roses"	Saint Jhn	
June 20	"Roses"	Saint Jhn	
June 27	"Banana"	Conkarah featuring Shaggy	
July 4	"Banana"	Conkarah featuring Shaggy	
July 11	"Banana"	Conkarah featuring Shaggy	
July 18	"Banana"	Conkarah featuring Shaggy	
July 25	"Banana"	Conkarah featuring Shaggy	
August 1	"Savage Love (Laxed – Siren Beat)"	Jawsh 685 and Jason Derulo	
August 8	"Savage Love (Laxed – Siren Beat)"	Jawsh 685 and Jason Derulo	
August 15	"Savage Love (Laxed – Siren Beat)"	Jawsh 685 and Jason Derulo	
August 22	"Savage Love (Laxed – Siren Beat)"	Jawsh 685 and Jason Derulo	
August 29	"Savage Love (Laxed – Siren Beat)"	Jawsh 685 and Jason Derulo	
September 5	"Más más más"	Rolf Sanchez	
September 12	"Más más más"	Rolf Sanchez	
September 19	"Head & Heart"	Joel Corry featuring MNEK	
September 26	"Head & Heart"	Joel Corry featuring MNEK	
October 3	"Head & Heart"	Joel Corry featuring MNEK	
October 10	"Head & Heart"	Joel Corry featuring MNEK	
October 17	"Head & Heart"	Joel Corry featuring MNEK	
October 24	"Jerusalema"	Master KG featuring Nomcebo Zikode	
October 31	"Jerusalema"	Master KG featuring Nomcebo Zikode	
November 7	"Jerusalema"	Master KG featuring Nomcebo Zikode	
November 14	"Jerusalema"	Master KG featuring Nomcebo Zikode	
November 21	"Jerusalema"	Master KG featuring Nomcebo Zikode	
November 28	"The Business"	Tiësto	
December 4	"The Business"	Tiësto	
December 11	"The Business"	Tiësto	
December 18	"The Business"	Tiësto	
December 25	"The Business"	Tiësto	

== Number-one artists ==
Position	Artist	Weeks #1
1	The Weeknd	14
2	Snelle	7
3	Conkarah	5
3	Shaggy (as featuring)	5
3	Jawsh 685	5
3	Jason Derulo	5
3	Joel Corry	5
3	MNEK (as featuring)	5
3	Master KG	5
3	Nomcebo Zikode (as featuring)	5
3	Tiësto	5
4	Davina Michelle	4
5	Tones and I	2
5	Saint Jhn	2
5	Rolf Sanchez	2

== See also ==
- 2020 in music
