= List of Dutch Top 40 number-one singles of 2019 =

This is a list of the Dutch Top 40 number-one singles of 2019. The Dutch Top 40 is a chart that ranks the best-performing singles of the Netherlands. It is published every week via radio station Qmusic.

== Chart history ==
Issue date	Song	Artist(s)	Ref.
January 5	"Duurt te lang"	Davina Michelle	
January 12	"Duurt te lang"	Davina Michelle	
January 19	"Sweet but Psycho"	Ava Max	
January 26	"Sweet but Psycho"	Ava Max	
February 2	"Sweet but Psycho"	Ava Max	
February 9	"Hij is van mij"	Kris Kross Amsterdam, Maan and Tabitha featuring Bizzey	
February 16	"Hij is van mij"	Kris Kross Amsterdam, Maan and Tabitha featuring Bizzey	
February 23	"Hij is van mij"	Kris Kross Amsterdam, Maan and Tabitha featuring Bizzey	
March 2	"Hij is van mij"	Kris Kross Amsterdam, Maan and Tabitha featuring Bizzey	
March 9	"Hij is van mij"	Kris Kross Amsterdam, Maan and Tabitha featuring Bizzey	
March 16	"Hij is van mij"	Kris Kross Amsterdam, Maan and Tabitha featuring Bizzey	
March 23	"Hij is van mij"	Kris Kross Amsterdam, Maan and Tabitha featuring Bizzey	
March 30	"Als het avond is"	Suzan & Freek	
April 6	"Als het avond is"	Suzan & Freek	
April 13	"Als het avond is"	Suzan & Freek	
April 20	"Con Calma"	Daddy Yankee featuring Snow	
April 27	"SOS"	Avicii featuring Aloe Blacc	
May 4	"SOS"	Avicii featuring Aloe Blacc	
May 11	"SOS"	Avicii featuring Aloe Blacc	
May 18	"Arcade"	Duncan Laurence	
May 25	"Arcade"	Duncan Laurence	
June 1	"Arcade"	Duncan Laurence	
June 8	"Arcade"	Duncan Laurence	
June 15	"Hoe het danst"	Marco Borsato, Armin van Buuren and Davina Michelle	
June 22	"Hoe het danst"	Marco Borsato, Armin van Buuren and Davina Michelle	
June 29	"Hoe het danst"	Marco Borsato, Armin van Buuren and Davina Michelle	
July 6	"Señorita"	Shawn Mendes and Camila Cabello	
July 13	"Señorita"	Shawn Mendes and Camila Cabello	
July 20	"Señorita"	Shawn Mendes and Camila Cabello	
July 27	"Señorita"	Shawn Mendes and Camila Cabello	
August 3	"Señorita"	Shawn Mendes and Camila Cabello	
August 10	"Señorita"	Shawn Mendes and Camila Cabello	
August 17	"Señorita"	Shawn Mendes and Camila Cabello	
August 24	"Señorita"	Shawn Mendes and Camila Cabello	
August 31	"Señorita"	Shawn Mendes and Camila Cabello	
September 7	"Señorita"	Shawn Mendes and Camila Cabello	
September 14	"Señorita"	Shawn Mendes and Camila Cabello	
September 21	"Señorita"	Shawn Mendes and Camila Cabello	
September 28	"Reünie"	Snelle	
October 5	"Dance Monkey"	Tones and I	
October 12	"Dance Monkey"	Tones and I	
October 19	"Dance Monkey"	Tones and I	
October 26	"Dance Monkey"	Tones and I	
November 2	"Dance Monkey"	Tones and I	
November 9	"Dance Monkey"	Tones and I	
November 16	"Dance Monkey"	Tones and I	
November 23	"Dance Monkey"	Tones and I	
November 30	"Dance Monkey"	Tones and I	
December 7	"Dance Monkey"	Tones and I	
December 14	"Dance Monkey"	Tones and I	
December 21	"Dance Monkey"	Tones and I	
December 28	"Dance Monkey"	Tones and I	

== Number-one artists ==
Position	Artist	Weeks #1
1	Tones and I	13
2	Shawn Mendes	12
2	Camila Cabello	12
3	Kris Kross Amsterdam	7
3	Maan	7
3	Tabitha	7
3	Bizzey (as featuring)	7
4	Davina Michelle	5
5	Duncan Laurence	4
6	Ava Max	3
6	Suzan & Freek	3
6	Avicii	3
6	Aloe Blacc (as featuring)	3
6	Marco Borsato	3
6	Armin van Buuren	3
7	Daddy Yankee	1
7	Snow (as featuring)	1
7	Snelle	1

== See also ==
- 2019 in music
