= Smoorverliefd =

Smoorverliefd may refer to:

- Smoorverliefd, 2010 film by Belgian director Hilde Van Mieghem
- Smoorverliefd, 2013 film, a Dutch version of film by Hilde Van Mieghem
- "Smoorverliefd", a song by Dutch ska band Doe Maar
- "Smoorverliefd", 2020 song by Dutch rapper Snelle produced by Donda Nisha
