= Blijven slapen =

Single by Snelle featuring Maan

from the album Lars
- Released: 26 February 2021
- Recorded: 2021
- Genre: Pop
- Length: 2:51
- Songwriters: Lars Bos; Arno Krabman; Okke Punt; Delano Ruitenbach; Maan de Steenwinkel

Snelle singles chronology
| "Papa heeft weer wat gelezen" (2020) | "Blijven slapen" (2021) | "Zonder jas naar buiten" (2021) |

Maan singles chronology
| "Als ik je weer zie" (2021) | "Blijven slapen" (2021) | "Nee is nee" (2021) |

"Blijven slapen is a song by Dutch rapper Snelle featuring Dutch singer Maan. The song was written by Snelle, Arno Krabman, Okke Punt, Delano Ruitenbach and Maan. It was included on Snelle's album Lars (2021) and on Maan's album Leven (2022).

"Blijven slapen" was commercially very successful, peaking at number one on the Dutch Top 40 and the Dutch Single Top 100, later also emerging as the best-selling song on the Single Top 100 for the year 2021.

== Commercial performance ==
The song reached the ninth position on the Dutch Top 40 and the second position on the Dutch Single Top 100. In June 2021, the song received a platinum certification in the Netherlands.

== Awards ==
In April 2021, Snelle and Maan won a 3FM Award with the song in the category of Best Collaboration.

== Charts ==
=== Weekly charts ===
Weekly chart performance for "De overkant"
| Chart (2021) | Peak position |
|---|---|
| Belgium (Ultratip) | 10 |
| Netherlands (Dutch Top 40) | 1 |
| Netherlands (Single Top 100) | 1 |

=== Year-end charts ===
2020 year-end chart performance for "17 miljoen mensen"
| Chart (2021) | Position |
|---|---|
| Netherlands (Dutch Top 40) | 3 |
| Netherlands (Single Top 100) | 1 |
