= Hotel desk =

Hotel desk may refer to:

- Hot desking
- The front desk for the receptionist at a hotel
