= Runway East =

British flexible workspace provider

Runway East is a British flexible workspace and serviced office provider founded in 2014 and headquartered in London, England. The company operates serviced offices and coworking spaces in London, Bristol, Brighton, Birmingham and Bath, serving start-ups and small and medium-sized enterprises.

== History ==
Runway East was founded in 2014 by entrepreneur Natasha Guerra alongside co-founders including Alex Hoye. Its first site opened near Old Street in London's technology cluster, serving early-stage technology companies.

During the mid 2010s and early 2020s the company expanded within London and into regional cities. In 2023, local business media reported that Runway East had become the largest coworking operator in Bristol city centre by floorspace.

Between 2024 and 2025, business and property publications covered the company's expansion into Bath and Birmingham. Reports on the Bath site highlighted a 23,000 sq ft lease at Kings Court, a Grade II listed building, and a 20-year partnership with Abrdn, identifying it as Runway East's third South West location.

Reporting from 2024 and 2025 also noted Runway East's expansion into Birmingham as part of a wider strategy to grow across the UK flexible workspace market.

By late 2024, Coworking Europe reported that Runway East hosted approximately 4,500 members across more than 31,000 m² of workspace and operated locations in London, Bristol, Brighton and Birmingham, with a twelfth site due to open under a long-term management agreement.

In 2025, an article by Proptech-X described Runway East's forthcoming Covent Garden site as adding to its portfolio of flexible workspace in London's West End and Midtown.

== Leadership ==
Runway East was co-founded by Natasha Guerra, who serves as its chief executive officer. UK business media have profiled Guerra's role in the flexible workspace sector. A 2024 profile in City A.M. discussed her early career in technology and her role in developing Runway East.

Industry interviews have highlighted her strategy of funding expansion through partnership agreements with landlords rather than venture capital.

== Operations ==
Runway East operates serviced offices and coworking spaces that include private offices, dedicated desks, hot-desking areas and shared amenities such as meeting rooms and communal spaces.

Independent reporting shows that the company operates multiple sites across London, including in Shoreditch, Aldgate East, Bloomsbury, Borough Market, London Bridge and Soho, as well as regional sites in Bristol, Brighton, Birmingham and Bath. Bristol Bridge, Temple Meads and the Bath Kings Court hub form part of what regional business outlets describe as the company's South West cluster.

== B Corp certification and sustainability ==
Runway East became a certified B Corporation in 2022. According to B Lab, the company achieved an overall B Impact Score of 97.5.

Independent commentary on B Corp-certified workspace operators in the United Kingdom has included Runway East among organisations adopting environmental and social practices in the flexible office sector.

== Reception ==
Regional business media in Bristol have described Runway East as the largest coworking operator in the city centre by floorspace, linking its growth to wider trends in hybrid working.

Industry publications such as Coworking Europe and Proptech-X have discussed the company's role in the UK flexible workspace market and its partnership-led expansion model.
