= Loïs Lane =

Dutch girl group

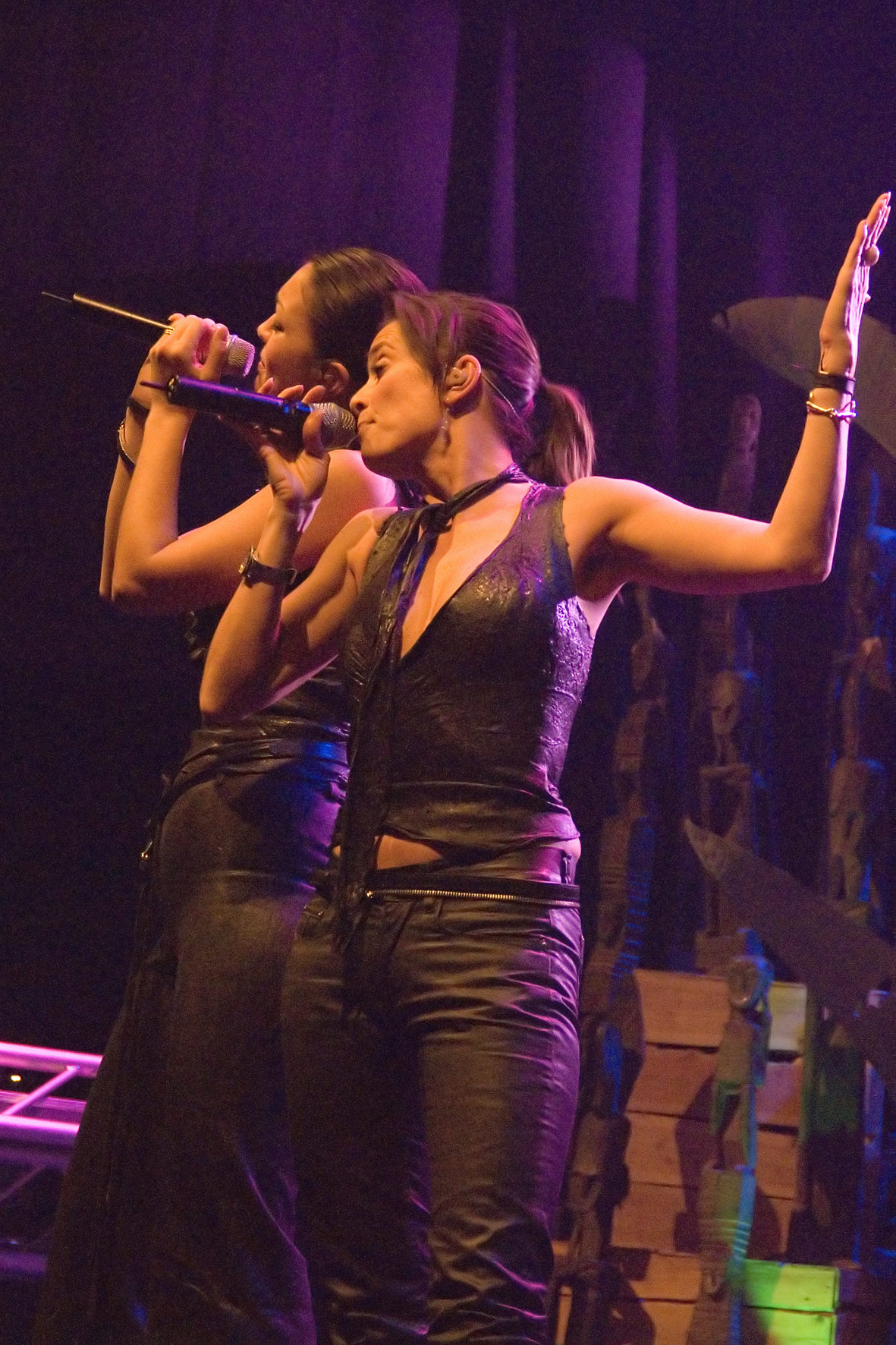
- Loïs Lane performing in 2006

Background information
- Origin: Amsterdam, Netherlands
- Genre: Pop
- Years active: 1984–present
- Label: Lana Lane (Polydor Records)
- Members: Monique Klemann; Suzanne Klemann
- Website: www.loislane.nl

Loïs Lane is a Dutch girl group consisting of the sisters Suzanne and Monique Klemann. The band was named after Superman's girlfriend, Lois Lane, from DC Comics. In the U.S. they are known as Lois L.

== Biography ==
The group was founded in 1984 by Monique Klemann; however, her background singer Angela left the group in 1985 and was replaced by her sister Suzanne Klemann. The sisters are of Indo (Eurasian) descent.

In 1987, they participated in the Grote Prijs van Nederland, the most important amateur musician contest, and were offered a record deal by Warner Music Group. In 1988, they recorded the title song "Amsterdamned" for the movie of the same name, which resulted in their first moderate success; however, the record label dropped them, and they started their own imprint, Lana Lane.

After this first exposure, they recorded their debut album Loïs Lane which peaked at No. 1, after their second single "It's The First Time" became a summer hit. This song came to the attention of Prince who became interested in the sisters.

In 1990, they joined Prince as the support act for some of the shows of his Nude Tour. In 1992, they recorded a new album Precious together with Prince, and recorded the two singles "Sex" and "Qualified". In 1997, they wrote the title song for the television program Combat, and also wrote the title song for an Emmy Awarded television program, Dunya and Desi, in 2003. They had some moderate success with their album, Covers, which featured cover versions.

In 2004, the sisters decided to pose for Playboy, partially as a joke.

In October 2013, they released their new album, As One, which spawned the singles "The Morning Patrol" and "You and You and Me".

=== Solo career of Monique Klemann ===
Cover of On Patrol

Monique started to embark on her solo career first as "Strapless In Soho", however she has released her debut solo album, On Patrol, in September 2006 under her own name. On Patrol was recorded because Monique played the leading role in the television series, Parels & Zwijnen, in which she sang jazz covers and thought that the songs deserved to be released as well. The album peaked at No. 35 in the Dutch Albums Chart.

== Discography ==
=== Albums ===
Date	Title	Chart (NL)	Certification
1989	Loïs Lane	1	Platinum
1990	Fortune Fairytales	4	Gold
1992	Precious	14	
1993	Live at The Arena	59	
1995	Fireflight	14	
1996	Covers	52	
1996	Hit Singles 86/96	31	
2000	Hear Me Out	-	
2009	Motown!	-	
2013	As One	-	

=== Singles ===
Year	Single	Peak positions		Album
Year	Single	NED	BEL (FLA)	Album
1987	"Break It Up!"	63	-	Loïs Lane
1987	"One Night Stand"	-	-	single only
1988	"Amsterdamned"	31	-	Loïs Lane
1989	"My Best Friend"	37	-	Loïs Lane
1989	"It's the First Time"	9	30	Loïs Lane
1990	"Fortune Fairytales"	7	35	Fortune Fairytales
1990	"I Wanna Be"	20	-	Fortune Fairytales
1990	"This Must Be Love"	45	-	Fortune Fairytales
1992	"Qualified"	14	-	Precious
1992	"Crying"	45	-	Precious
1992	"I Oh I"	-	-	Precious
1993	"Sex"	48	-	Precious
1993	"People"	-	-	single only
1994	"Medley"	-	-	Live at the Arena
1995	"Tonight"	11	-	Fireflight
1995	"Something About Her"	-	-	Fireflight
1995	"Hand"	-	-	Fireflight
1996	"Heart of Glass"	-	-	Covers!
1996	"Simply Beautiful"	50	-	Hitsingles 86/96
1998	"Combat"	52	-	singles only
1999	"Everytime I Hear Your Name"	-	-	singles only
2000	"Now That You Have Gone"	85	-	Hear Me Out
2000	"Whatever You May Know"	-	-	Hear Me Out
2002	"When I'm with You"	36	-	singles only
2003	"Here You Come Again"	-	-	singles only
2004	"This Christmas"	-	-	singles only
2007	"Christmas Letter from a Soldier's Wife"	-	-	singles only
2013	"The Morning Patrol"	-	-	As One
2013	"It's Because"	-	-	As One
2014	"You and You and Me"	-	-	As One
"—" denotes releases that did not chart or were not released.
