= Hot racking =

Practice of assigning more than one person to a sleeping space over a shift rotation

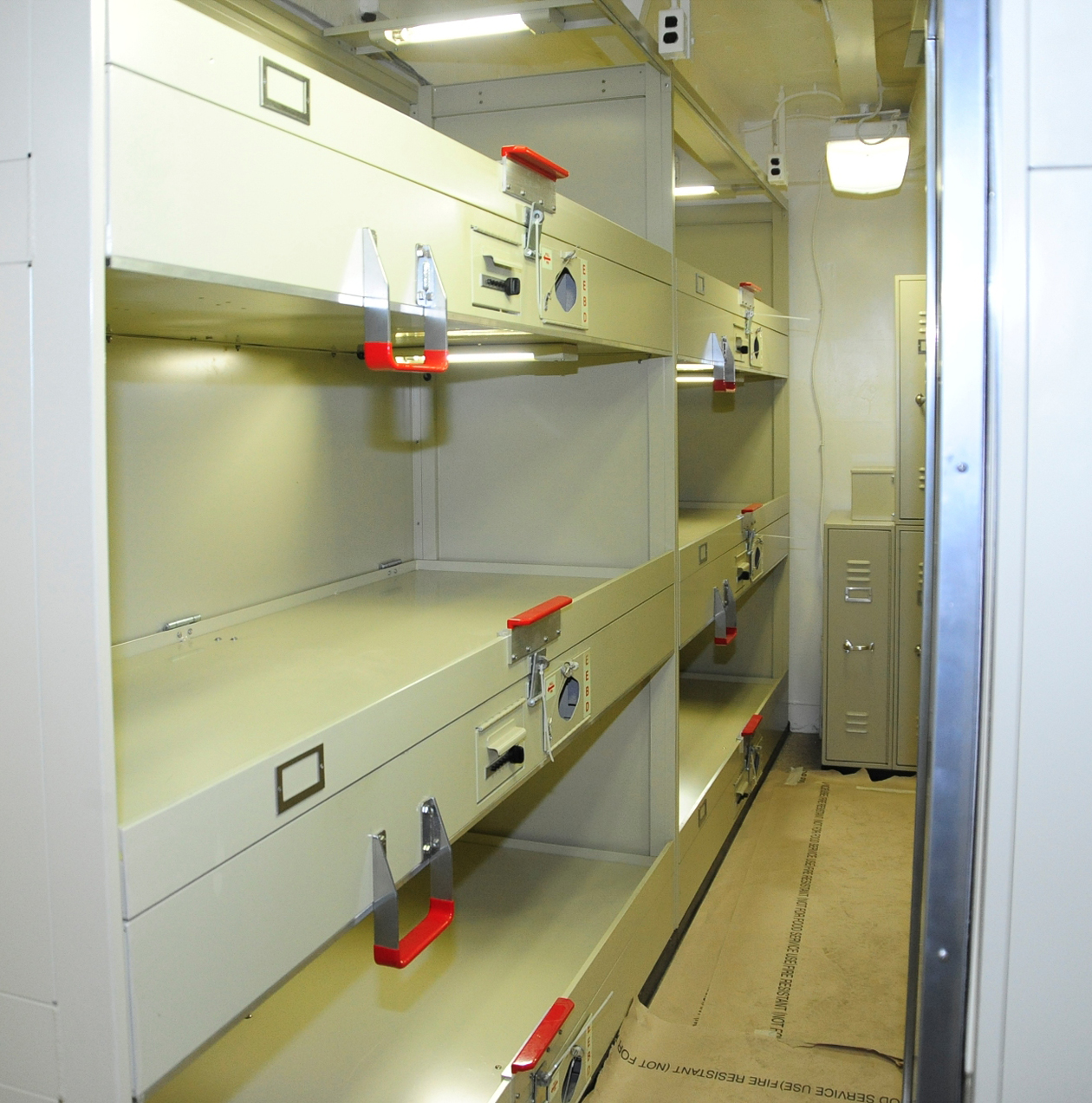
Bunk beds aboard a US Navy ship

Hot racking, hot bunking or hot bedding is the sanctioned practice within military organizations of assigning more than one crew member to a bed or "rack" to reduce berthing (sleeping) space.

== History ==
The practice dates back at least to the sixteenth century, and today is particularly applied aboard submarines, where maximization of space is especially important. Generally, the lowest ranking members of the crew are required to hot rack. Hot racking is sometimes used in jails and prisons to deal with overcrowding.

Depending upon the watch system, two, or even three people may end up sharing the same bunk. The term comes from the military slang use of the term "rack" for a bed or bunk. With more than one crew member assigned to a rack, it is possible that a crew member returning from a duty shift will lie down on a rack immediately after it is vacated by another crew member about to start a shift. The rack is therefore said to be "hot", that is, still warm from the vacating crew member's body heat.

== See also ==
- List of established military terms
- Hot desking
- Seabasing
- Work shift
