= Hoe het danst =

2019 single by Marco Borsato, Armin van Buuren and Davina Michelle

Single by Marco Borsato, Armin van Buuren and Davina Michelle
- Language: Dutch
- Released: 8 May 2019
- Genre: Dance-pop; EDM
- Length: 4:12
- Label: Universal
- Songwriters: Armin van Buuren; Benno de Goeij; John Ewbank
- Producers: Ewbank; Van Buuren; De Goeij

Marco Borsato singles chronology
"Vrienden" (2018)	"Hoe het danst" (2019)	"Lippenstift" (2019)

Armin van Buuren singles chronology
"Revolution" (2019)	"Hoe het danst" (2019)	"Something Real" (2019)

Davina Michelle singles chronology
"Skyward" (2019)	"Hoe het danst" (2019)	"Better Now" (2019)

"Hoe het danst" (lit. 'How It Dances') is a song by Dutch musicians Marco Borsato, Armin van Buuren and Davina Michelle. It was released on 8 May 2019, in anticipation of Borsato's upcoming stadium concerts at De Kuip. The song features Borsato and Michelle's vocals with Van Buuren's production. It was intended to be the lead single for a duets-themed Borsato album, which was eventually cancelled when Borsato announced a hiatus for burnout in January 2020.

The song spent three weeks at number one on the Dutch Top 40. It was seen as a comeback hit for Borsato, who had not reached the top ten in six years and number one in 11 years. The song was also Van Buuren's first number-one hit, Michelle's second and Borsato's fifteenth.

"Hoe het danst" was named the biggest hit song of 2019 in the Netherlands, and also became the first Dutch-language song to record over 100 million streams on Spotify.

== Background ==
The song was the first in a scheduled series of collaborations that Marco Borsato wanted to do with his songwriting partner John Ewbank to celebrate 30 years of making music together. Borsato planned to have Armin van Buuren as a special guest during his series of sold-out concerts at De Kuip in Rotterdam later that year, and Van Buuren told him, "If we do this, I want there to be a song too." Borsato said, "Speaking Dutch is difficult, certainly in dance. This way, it does justice to all these generations. The original intention was, how do we connect all those worlds?"

"Hoe het danst" was released without warning on 8 May 2019, alongside Borsato's announcement of Van Buuren as a guest artist during his concerts.

Borsato, Michelle and Van Buuren performed the song together during Borsato's De Kuip concerts in May and June. The trio also performed the song together at 2019 Pinkpop Festival, with Ewbank also on stage.

The song was planned to appear on a duets-themed Borsato studio album, but the album was cancelled when Borsato announced a hiatus from the music industry in 2020 because of burnout.

Michelle stopped performing the song live after Borsato was accused of child sexual abuse in late 2021. However, the song returned to her repertoire in 2023, and Michelle said, "At the time, I was hesitant about singing the song because I was afraid people would only think about Marco instead of enjoying the show. But now I'm like, 'It's my song too!'"

== Commercial performance ==
"Hoe het danst" debuted at No. 7 on the Dutch Top 40. It was Borsato's 27th top-10 hit, tying Golden Earring for the most top ten hits by a Dutch artist. It reached number one in June 2019, becoming Borsato's fifteenth, Michelle's second and Van Buuren's first number-one single. Borsato moved closer to The Beatles' record for 16 number-one hits in the Netherlands. Upon its third and final week at number one, Borsato recorded a total of 72 weeks at number one in his career, while The Beatles' record stood at 74. It was seen as a comeback hit for Borsato, whose last top ten single was "Ik zou het zo weer overdoen" in 2013, while his last number-one hit was "Dochters" in 2008. The Dutch Top 40 named it the biggest hit single of 2019 in the Netherlands.

"Hoe het danst" was also the first Dutch-language song to cross 100 million streams on Spotify. It overtook Michelle's own song "Duurt te lang" as the most-streamed Dutch-language song. It was the second-most streamed song in the Netherlands during 2019.

The song also spent ten weeks at number one in Belgium (Flanders), becoming the longest-running Dutch-language number-one hit in Belgium of the decade, and was certified quadruple-platinum.

== Music video ==
The music video for the song was released on 22 May 2019, directed by Thomas Melgers and Tim Toorman.

== Covers ==
In October 2021, Helene Fischer released a German-language cover of the song titled "Null auf 100".

== Charts ==
=== Weekly charts ===
Weekly chart performance for "Hoe het danst"
Chart (2019–20)	Peak position
Belgium (Ultratop 50 Flanders)	1
Netherlands (Dutch Top 40)	1
Netherlands (Single Top 100)	2

=== Yearly charts ===
Year-end chart performance for "Hoe het danst"
Chart (2019)	Position
Belgium (Ultratop 50 Flanders)	3
Netherlands (Dutch Top 40)	1
Netherlands (Single Top 100)	3

Chart (2020)	Position
Belgium (Ultratop 50 Flanders)	32
Netherlands (Single Top 100)	31

=== Decade-end charts ===
Decade-end chart performance for "Hoe het danst"
Chart (2010–2019)	Position
Netherlands (Single Top 100)	38
