= De overkant =

Single by Suzan & Freek featuring Snelle

from the album Dromen in kleur
- Released: 21 August 2020
- Recorded: 2020
- Genre: Pop
- Length: 2:50
- Songwriters: Suzan Stortelder; Freek Rikkerink; Arno Krabman; Léon Palmen; Lars Bos
- Producer: Krabman

Suzan & Freek singles chronology
"Weg van jou" (2020)	"De overkant" (2020)	"Papa" (2020)

Snelle singles chronology
"Kleur" (2020)	"De overkant" (2020)	"In de schuur" (2020)

"De overkant" (lit. 'The otherside') is a song by Dutch duo Suzan & Freek featuring Snelle. It was written by Suzan Stortelder, Freek Rikkerink, Arno Krabman, Léon Palmen and Lars Bos, with Krabman also serving as its producer. It was included on the duo's second studio album Dromen In Kleur released in 2021. The song was meant as an ode to the Achterhoek, the region where all three artists grew up and by extension, it served as an ode to growing up in a small village and the beauty that comes along with it.

On 19 August, the duo teased a brief acoustic performance of the song together with Snelle, before its premiere two days later. A music video was also filmed and released on the same day as the song, under the direction of Wefilm.

== Background ==
"De overkant" was written by Suzan & Freek in collaboration with Arno Krabman, Léon Palmen and Lars Bos (Snelle), with Krabman also serving as its producer. The song lyrically discusses feelings of nostalgia towards one's childhood in a small town with one street with a café and a church, specifically the Achterhoek where all three artists grew up. The trio decided to record the song as they all stem from the same region in the Netherlands. They met several times behind the scenes during their performances before they came up with the idea of recording a song together.

== Commercial performance ==
The song was commercially successful, appearing on the charts in the Netherlands and Belgium. It debuted at number 14 on the Dutch Top 40 chart for the week of 29 August 2020. It moved to its peak position of number two six weeks later, on the issue dated 17 October 2020. It was also successful on the Dutch Single Top 100; it debuted at number 6 on the chart for the week of 29 August 2020 and that also became its peak position. As of 2026, it has spent a total of 56 weeks on the chart. In Belgium, the song peaked at number 11 in its third week on the chart, for the chart issue dated 12 September 2020.

== Charts ==
=== Weekly charts ===
Weekly chart performance for "De overkant"
Chart (2020)	Peak position
Belgium (Ultratop 50 Flanders)	11
Netherlands (Dutch Top 40)	2
Netherlands (Single Top 100)	6

=== Year-end charts ===
2020 year-end chart performance for "17 miljoen mensen"
Chart (2020)	Position
Netherlands (Dutch Top 40)	28
Netherlands (Single Top 100)	41
