= Achmea =

Dutch financial services company

Achmea Holding N.V.
- Company type: Naamloze vennootschap
- Industry: Financial services
- Founded: January 1, 1995 (merger)
- Headquarters: Zeist, Netherlands
- Products: Insurance
- Website: www.achmea.nl

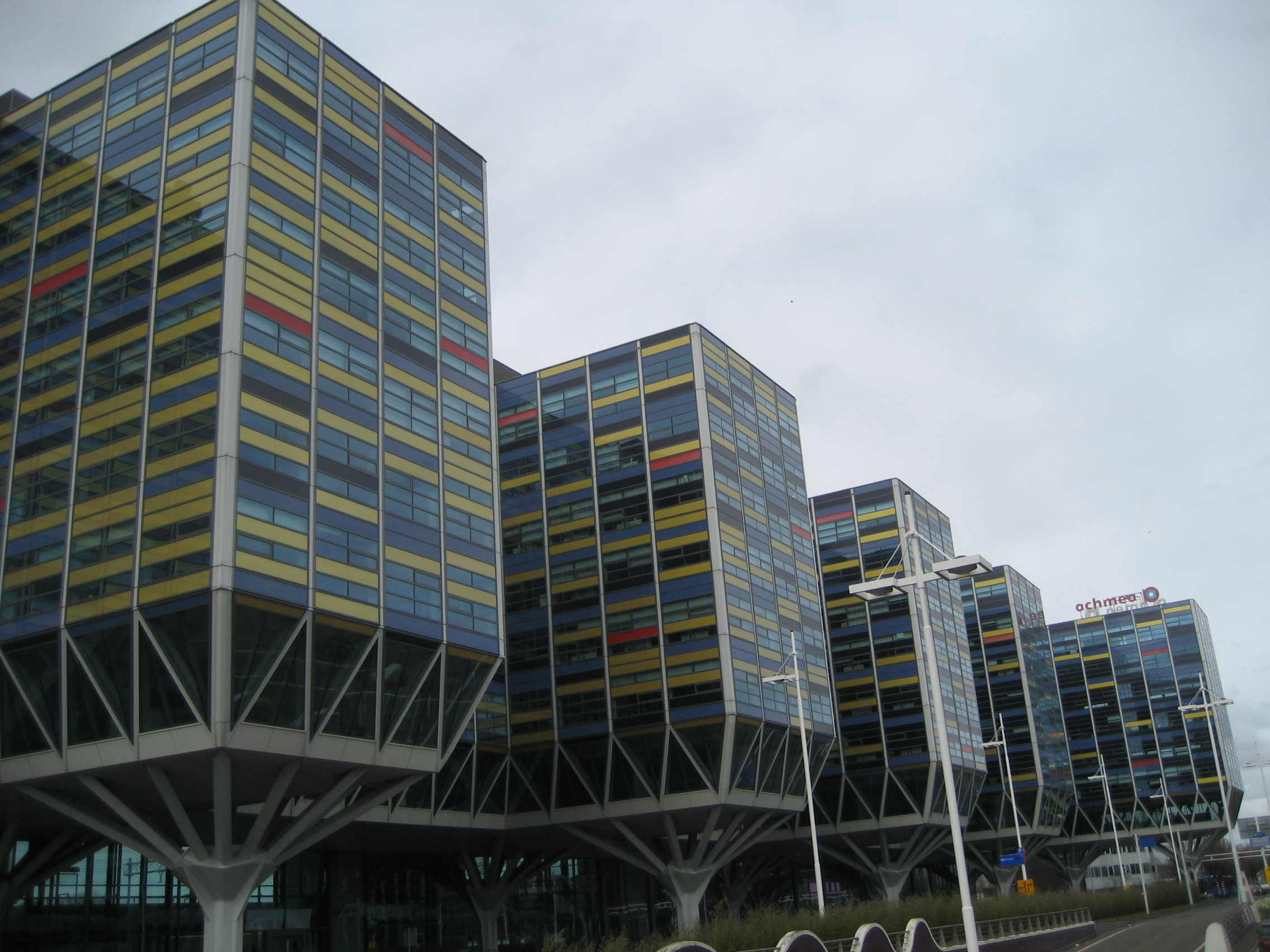
Achmea building in Leiden

Achmea Holding N.V. is one of the largest suppliers of financial services (mainly insurance) in the Netherlands. The company was formed by a merger of Zilveren Kruis and Avéro Centraal Beheer Groep on January 1, 1995. The roots of Achmea date back to 1811 when the Frisian accountant, Ulbe Piers Draisma, founded the "Onderlinge Brand Assurantie Sociëteit (Achlum)" in Achlum, Frisia, the Netherlands.

In 2000, Achmea became a part of Eureko BV, which in 2011 merged with the Dutch parent company Achmea N.V. to form Achmea B.V. The Vereniging Achmea (association) owns or controls 63.3% of Achmea B.V. of its votes, the Dutch bank Rabobank owns or controls 31.3% of the shares, the other 5.4% of the shares are owned or controlled by strategic partners.

Achmea brands include Agis, Avéro, Centraal Beheer, FBTO, Interpolis, Syntrus and Zilveren Kruis (often suffixed by 'Achmea').

Of the ten largest insurance companies in the Netherlands, Achmea is one of the two that was found in a 2015 investigation to not invest in arms trade to dictatorships, fragile states and corrupt countries (ASR being the other one).

== See also ==
- List of banks in the euro area
- List of banks in the Netherlands
