= Más más más =

2020 song by Rolf Sanchez

Single by Rolf Sanchez
- Released: 2020
- Recorded: 2020
- Genre: Latin pop
- Length: 2:32
- Label: 8ball / Top Act / Universal
- Songwriters: Alex van der Zouwen; Andy Clay; Paul Sinha; Gyo Kretz; Morrison Wijnen; Yves Lassally; Cruz Felipe; Rolf Wienk
- Producer: La$a

Rolf Sanchez singles chronology
"Como tu" (2020)	"Más más más" (2020)

Music video
- "Más más más" on YouTube

"Más más más" (Spanish pronunciation: [mas mas ˈmas], Dutch: [mɑs mɑs ˈmɑs]) is a 2020 song by Dominican-Dutch singer Rolf Sanchez that charted in the Dutch and Belgian singles charts. Rolf Sanchez, a Dominican-Dutch singer was born as Rolf Wienk in Ede, Netherlands on July 3 1991 is a Dominican-Dutch singer and was famous after having taken part in 2011 in the fourth season of the Dutch version of television show X Factor, where he finished third place. "Más más más" was released on 8ball and Top Act label and distributed by Universal Records. Co-written by Rolf "Sanchez" Wienk in collaboration, the track was produced by La$$a. It peaked at number one on both the Dutch Single Top 100 and the Dutch Top 40 charts.

It follows his 2019 salsa tune "Paso a Paso" on the Billboard Latin charts, and him taking part in the Dutch singing program Beste Zangers in 2019, where he sang the song "Pa Olvidarte" together with Emma Heesters. The song reached number two on both the Dutch Top 40 and the Single Top 100. "Más más más" comes as a follow-up to his hit "Como tu" that made it to number 22 on the Dutch Top 40.

== Charts ==
=== Weekly charts ===
Weekly chart performance for "Más más más"
Chart (2020)	Peak position
Belgium (Ultratop 50 Flanders)	16
Netherlands (Dutch Top 40)	1
Netherlands (Single Top 100)	1
Suriname (Nationale Top 40)	3

=== Year-end charts ===
2020 year-end chart performance for "Más más más"
Chart (2020)	Position
Belgium (Ultratop Flanders)	92
Netherlands (Dutch Top 40)	27
Netherlands (Single Top 100)	22

2021 year-end chart performance for "Más más más"
Chart (2021)	Position
Netherlands (Single Top 100)	90

== Certifications ==
Certifications for "Más más más"
Region	Certification	Certified units/sales
Belgium (BRMA)	Gold	20,000^{‡}
Netherlands (NVPI)	Gold	40,000^{‡}
^{‡} Sales+streaming figures based on certification alone.

== See also ==
- List of Dutch Top 40 number-one singles of 2020
