= Als het avond is =

2018 single by Suzan & Freek

Single by Suzan & Freek

from the album Gedeeld door ons
- Language: Dutch
- Released: 2 November 2018
- Length: 3:25
- Label: Sony Music
- Songwriters: Arno Krabman; Leon Palmen; Freek Rikkerink; Suzan Stortelder
- Producer: Arno Krabman

Suzan & Freek singles chronology
"Als het avond is" (2018)	"Blauwe dag" (2019)

"Als het avond is" (lit. 'When It's Evening') is the debut single by the Dutch musical duo Suzan & Freek. It was released on 2 November 2018 and later included on their 2019 debut studio album Gedeeld door ons.

The duo rose to fame by posting covers of pop songs on Facebook. "Als het avond is" was the first original song they wrote. It rose to number one on the Dutch Top 40 after 17 weeks on the chart, breaking a 48-year-old record for longest rise to the top, and spent three weeks at the peak. It became one of the biggest Dutch-language hit songs of all time.

== Background ==
Suzan & Freek first went viral when The Chainsmokers shared their cover of "Don't Let Me Down". The duo used the attention to earn support slots for shows in the Netherlands.

"Als het avond is" was the first original song that Suzan & Freek wrote. It was originally an English-language song named "A Night Like This". However, they realised quickly that writing songs in English did not suit them. "You know much more about the meaning of what exactly you sing," Freek Rikkerink said about writing Dutch lyrics.

The duo was also unsure if their own compositions would appeal to the public. "If it feels right, we release it. Otherwise we'll put it in a drawer and never listen to it again," Rikkerink said. The song was written in an afternoon, and a demo was sent to Sony Music, who agreed to release it as a single.

The success of "Als het avond is" allowed the duo to quit their jobs and focus on music full time – Suzan Stortelder as an interior designer, and Freek Rikkerink as a record label employee.

The duo also attempted to write a German-language version of the song, but was unsatisfied with it. They played it live once on Radio 538 in 2025. A musician in China also recorded a Chinese-language version of the song with the duo's approval.

== Lyrics ==
Stortelder said that the song is "not about our relationship, although that is often assumed. We heard from people that they thought 'We're breaking up.' But it's about the feeling that we've both had that you miss someone very much. That could be a family member or a friend you're dating who you slowly lose contact with. You can no longer talk, you no longer reach the other."

Rikkerink said that "We got a lot of messages from people who recognised themselves in it; for example, because they were separated or depressed."

== Commercial performance ==
In December 2018, "Als het avond is" debuted at No. 30 on the Dutch Top 40 as the highest entry of the week. It reached number one in March 2019 after 17 weeks on the chart, breaking a 48-year-old record previously held by Les Poppys' "Non, non, rien n'a changé" (14 weeks) for the longest climb to number one in chart history. It remained at number one for three weeks.

In March 2019, before the song reached number one, it was already certified Gold in the Netherlands. It would eventually be certified 3× Platinum. As of November 2024, the song recorded over 90 million streams on Spotify.

In 2021, the Dutch Top 40 reported that it was the fourteenth-biggest Dutch language hit song of all time.

== Reception ==
In 2019, the song entered at No. 278 in the annual Top 2000 greatest songs of all time poll, hosted by NPO Radio 2.

== Charts ==
=== Weekly charts ===
Weekly chart performance for "Als het avond is"
Chart (2018–19)	Peak position
Belgium (Ultratop 50 Flanders)	4
Netherlands (Dutch Top 40)	1
Netherlands (Single Top 100)	3

=== Yearly charts ===
Year-end chart performance for "Als het avond is"
Chart (2019)	Position
Belgium (Ultratop 50 Flanders)	12
Netherlands (Dutch Top 40)	4
Netherlands (Single Top 100)	12

=== Decade-end charts ===
Decade-end chart performance for "Als het avond is"
Chart (2010–2019)	Position
Netherlands (Single Top 100)	90
