= DLL Group =

Global vendor finance company

DLL
- Company type: Fully owned subsidiary
- Industry: Financial services
- Founded: 1969
- Headquarters: Eindhoven
- Key people: Lara Yocarini, Chairman of the Board; Mike Janse (COO); Marc Dierckx (CFO); Yke Hoefsmit (CRO); Neal Garnett (CCO)
- Products: Leasing; Vendor finance Commercial finance Fleet solutions
- Number of employees: >5,000 (2020)
- Website: www.dllgroup.com

De Lage Landen International B.V. (DLL) is a global vendor finance company with almost EUR 40 billion in assets. Founded in 1969 and headquartered in Eindhoven, The Netherlands, it provides asset-based financial solutions in the Agriculture, Food, Healthcare, Clean technology, Construction, Transportation, Industrial Equipment, Office Equipment and Technology industries.

DLL is a wholly owned subsidiary of Rabobank Group.

DLL is a credit institution under the Capital Requirements Regulation (CRR) and is a 100% subsidiary of the Coöperatieve Rabobank U.A. (Rabobank). DLL operates through local legal entities, which may conduct business using local licenses and under supervision of local regulators (e.g., DLL Finans AB in Sweden and Banco De Lage Landen Brasil S.A. in Brasil). For (part of) the business in Germany, Italy, Spain and Portugal, business is executed in branches of DLL where the passporting rights of DLL are leveraged. DLL holds 100% of the shares of its subsidiaries, except for “ joint ventures,” where DLL still controls the entities by having a majority in voting rights and economic interest.

In 2013, DLL was ranked in the top five of European Leasing Companies and, in 2014, ranked first in the Top 25 Vendor Finance companies in the U.S.

== History ==
DLL was founded in 1969 as De Lage Landen by Rabobank and Interpolis as a credit company.

For 2014 DLL reported a 10% growth of its portfolio to reach 34.5 billion Euro (42 billion USD) and net profit of 454 million Euro (602 million USD). This is a 13% increase compared to 2013. In 2014, the company rebranded as DLL, along with a new logo.

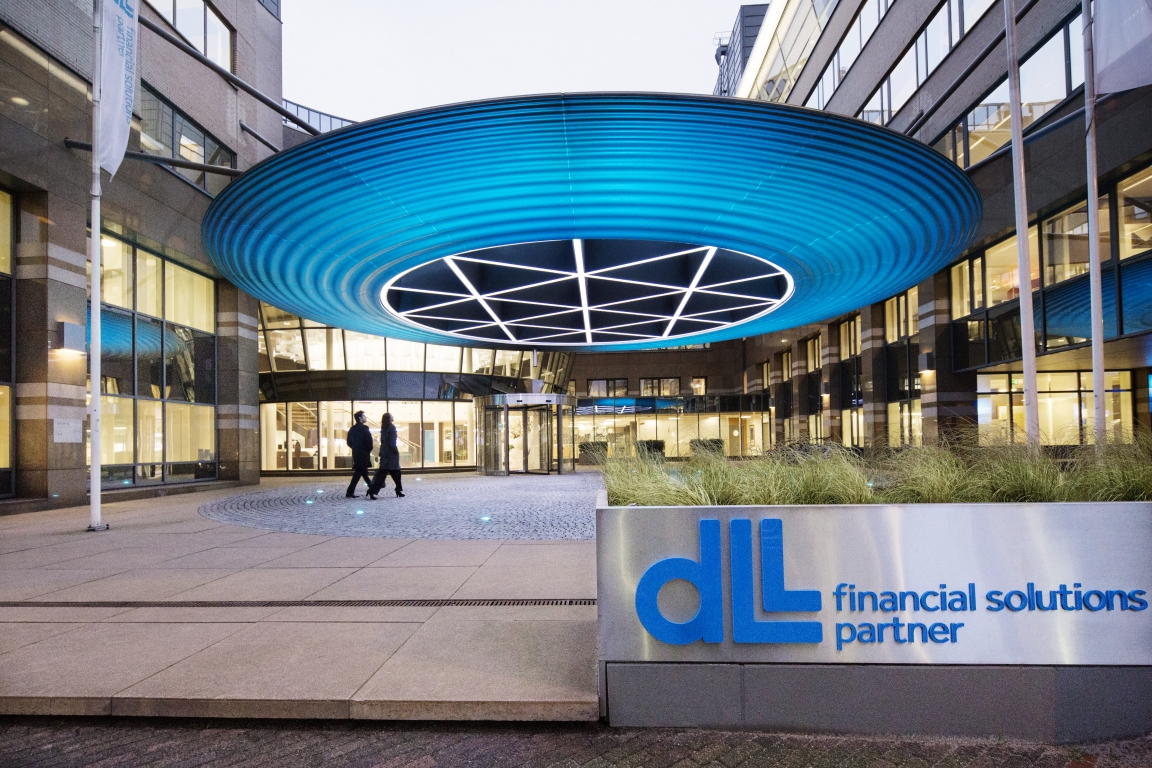
Headquarters in Eindhoven, the Netherlands

=== EMEA (Europe, the Middle East and Africa) ===
- Started in 1969;
- Operating in 20 countries (Austria, Belgium, Denmark, Finland, France, Germany, Hungary, Ireland, Italy, Luxembourg, Netherlands, Norway, Poland, Portugal, Russia, Spain, Sweden, Switzerland, Turkey, and the United Kingdom);
- 46.2% of DLL’s leasing portfolio is generated in EMEA (2020);

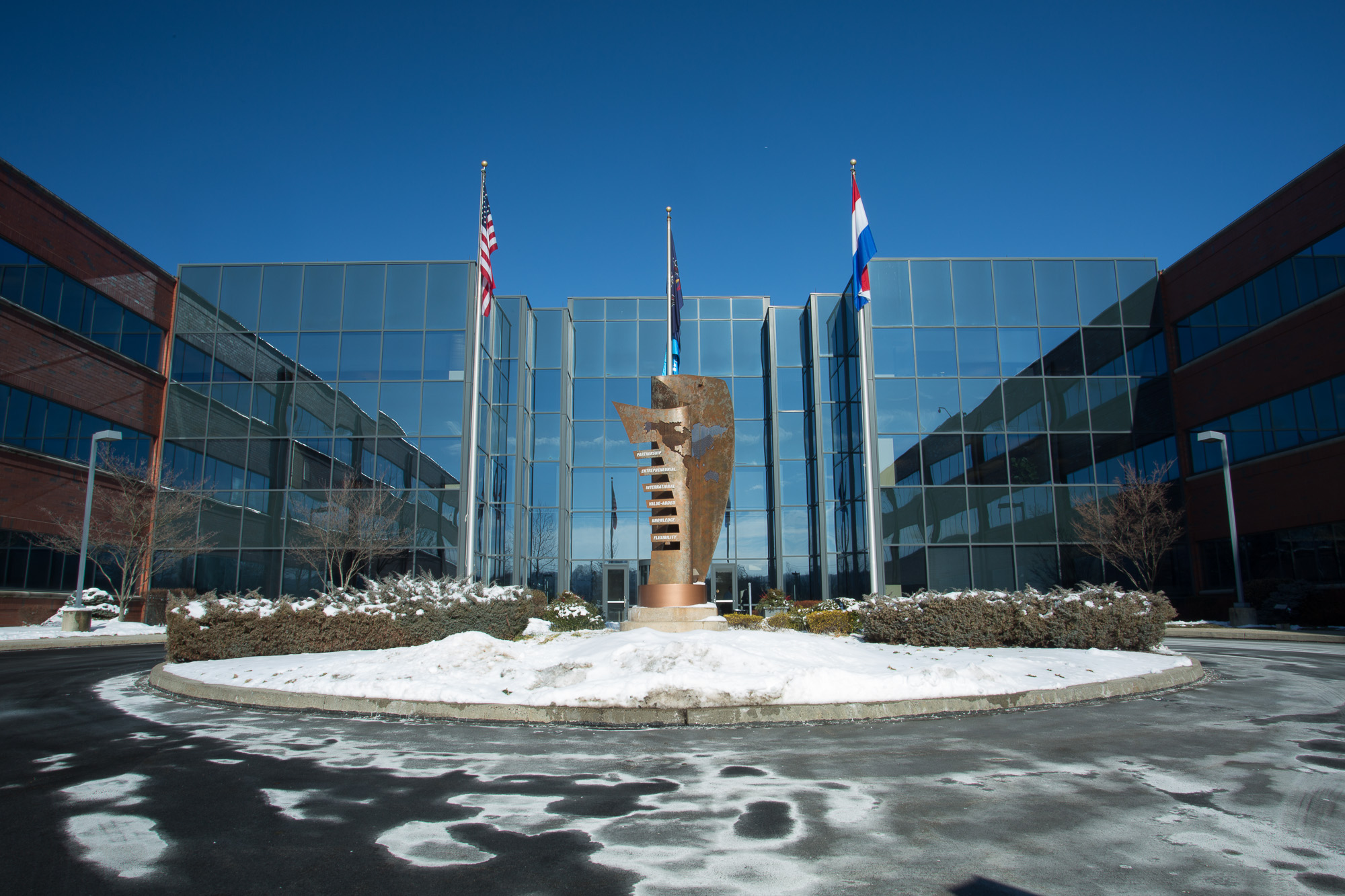
American headquarters in Wayne, U.S.A.

=== Americas ===
- Started in this region in 1998;
- Established in 8 countries (Argentina, Brazil, Canada, Chile, Colombia, Mexico, Peru and the United States of America);
- 45.6% of DLL’s leasing portfolio is generated in the Americas (2020);
- USA Locations
  - Wayne, PA
  - Johnston, IA
  - Duluth, GA
  - Las Vegas, NV

=== Asia Pacific ===
- Started in this region in 2002;
- Established in 6 countries (Australia, China (including Hong Kong), India, Singapore, South Korea and New Zealand);
- 8.2% of DLL’s leasing portfolio is generated in Asia Pacific (2020);

== Key moments in the company’s history ==
1969	De Lage Landen is founded by Rabobank and Interpolis
1982	Introduction of operational leasing which became the basis for vendor finance
1982	Introduction of car leasing
1987	Expansion into Europe
1989	Introduction of the company color process blue
1997	Updated logo: De Lage Landen, partners in finance
1998	Expansion into North America
1999	Acquisition of Tokai Financial Services, a company that focuses on small-equipment financing
2002	Expansion into South America and Australia
2004	Expansion into Asia
2005	Acquisition of Telia Finans, market leader Scandinavia in leasing IT and Office Equipment
2006	Acquisition of Athlon Car Lease, an international car leasing company
2006	Expansion into Central and Eastern Europe
2007	Launch of Freo online consumer finance in the Netherlands
2011	Started Operations in India
2014	Renewed brand identity: DLL, financial solutions partner
2016	Sale of mobility entity, Athlon, to Daimler Financial Services
2017	Transfer of Dutch Financial Solutions business line to Rabobank

2024 Proposed acquisition of elf leasing gmbh
