= Activity-based working =

Organisational strategic framework

Activity-based working (ABW) is an organizational strategic framework that recognizes that people often perform a variety of activities in their day-to-day work, and therefore need a variety of work settings supported by the right technology and culture to carry out these activities effectively. Based on activity, individuals, teams, and the organization are empowered to achieve their full potential by developing a culture of connection, inspiration, accountability, and trust. On a personal level, ABW also enables each person to organize their work activities in a way that best suits what and with whom they are trying to accomplish, promoting productivity and engagement at work. Although not normally implemented as a cost-saving business strategy, it can produce efficiencies and cost savings through more effective collaboration and team work. Inspiring spaces that evolve from an activity-based approach are designed to create opportunities for a variety of workplace activities, ranging from intense focused work to collaboration, as well as areas for meetings, whether formal or impromptu.

ABW is a framework that encompasses a holistic way of working that goes beyond the physical office space, incorporating the technological platforms and tools as well as the digital and cultural environments that support work activities - with an ultimate goal of encouraging individuals to flourish, teams to connect, and organizations to thrive. However, some studies have suggested that ABW can have negative impacts on an organization by reducing face-to-face interactions and increasing email traffic significantly.

== History ==
The first known example of an activit-based office is an IBM small-scale experiment from 1970 in which a group of about twenty IBM product engineers move into what was called a ‘non-territorial office’. In their new office, the IBM employees no longer had personal workstations, but could choose from a variety of shared workspaces that were intended to facilitate different kinds of activities: normal desks, but also work benches, a quiet area and even a ‘total quiet area’.

The first time use of the term activity-based was by American architect Robert Luchetti in the late 1970s. in 1983, Luchetti co-invented the now widely accepted concept of the office as a series of "activity settings". In an activity settings-based environment, multiple settings are provided which have different technical and physical attributes assembled to support the variety of performance "modes" that take place in a work environment.

The term "Activity Based Working" was first coined in the book the Art of Working by Erik Veldhoen, a Dutch consultant with Veldhoen + Company, and author of the book The Demise of the Office. Activity Based Working was first implemented in the Netherlands by Interpolis in collaboration with Veldhoen + Company in the nineties. Interpolis is one of largest insurance companies in the Netherlands. The company gained wide recognition with its advertising campaign "Interpolis. Crystal clear", which was adopted from their vision and brought to life in their new way of working.

== The activity-based office ==
The activity-based office concept is said to increase productivity through the stimulation of interaction and communication while retaining employee satisfaction and reducing the accommodation costs. Although some research has gone into understanding the added value, there is still a need for sound data on the relationship between office design, its intentions and the actual use after implementation.

The concept of activity-based workplace has been implemented in organisations as a solution to improve office space efficiency. However, the question of whether or not office workers' comfort or productivity are compromised in the pursuit of space efficiency has not been fully investigated. There are obstacles and issues of concern when practicing the activity-based office concept. A study carried out in activity-based workplace settings reports that employees without an assigned desk complain of desk shortages, difficulty finding colleagues which limits immediate collaboration, wasted time finding and setting up a workstation, and limited ability to adjust or personalise workstations to meet individual ergonomic needs. Another study suggest the impact of office design on occupants' satisfaction, perceived productivity and health, pointing towards reduced time workers spent seated in ABW offices

The most recent study released in 2020 by Veldhoen + Company, the founders of Activity Based Working, was the biggest global research project on Activity Based Working. The research set out to understand the measurable impact of Activity Based Working and the drivers of success in Activity Based Working transitions. The research project was started in July 2019, and was impacted by the COVID-19 pandemic in 2020. The report included 32,369 responses spanning 11 countries, and explored questions used in Leesman Index surveys providing valuable context to understanding office workers' behaviour - with the opportunity to explore what factors would be most important as organisations transition to a post-pandemic return to the office. The data tells us not only what type of workplace to return to, but also how to do so.

== Activity-based offices of the future ==
To create a successful work environment, it is important to have insight into the demands and behaviours of the employees using this environment. It has been trending in recent years as offices seek to adopt a “fewer desks, more open spaces” approach. Recently there has also been a move towards understanding interior design features underpinning occupants' higher satisfaction results in ABW, open-plan offices

However, the three fundamental pillars that support a new way of working continue to be the same - the (1) behavioural, (2) virtual and (3) physical work environments, which can be linked to the working processes of human resources, IT and facility management in the work environment. Access to new technologies and analysis methods such as Organisational Network Analysis and other workplace metrics will continue to shape the future of leaders ability to understand and plan for the future of their organisations.

== See also ==
- Hot desking
