= 15 miljoen mensen =

Single by Fluitsma & Van Tijn
- Released: 3 February 1996
- Recorded: 1996
- Genre: Pop
- Length: 3:57
- Label: Dino
- Songwriters: Jochem Fluitsma; Eric van Tijn; Frank Pels

"15 miljoen mensen" (lit. '15 Million People') is a song by Dutch duo Fluitsma & Van Tijn released in 1996. The lyrics for the song were written by Frank Pels. It was originally intended for a commercial for Postbank N.V.. The brief version of the song for the commercial became very popular which led to a longer recording. The phrase "15 miljoen mensen" was later included in the dictionary by van Dale in 2018. The song was covered several times, most notably in the midst of the COVID-19 pandemic in 2020, by Dutch singer Davina Michelle and rapper Snelle with modified lyrics and a modified title, "17 miljoen mensen".

== Commercial performance ==
On the chart issue dated 3 February 1996, the song debuted at number 27 on the Dutch Top 40. It managed to peak at number one on the Dutch Top 40 chart for the chart issue dated 17 February 1996 where it stayed for two consecutive weeks. It spent a total of 17 weeks on the chart, last being seen at a position of 28 on 27 April 1996. On the Single Top 100, it debuted at number 34 on the chart issue of 3 February 1996, only to move to the top of the chart in its third week, on 17 February 1996. It spent an additional week on top of the chart.

== Charts ==
=== Weekly charts ===
Chart performance for "15 miljoen mensen"
Chart (1996)	Peak position
Netherlands (Dutch Top 40)	1
Netherlands (Single Top 100)	1

=== Year-end charts ===
1996 year-end chart performance for "15 miljoen mensen"
Chart (1996)	Position
Netherlands (Dutch Top 40)	17
Netherlands (Single Top 100)	8

== Davina Michelle and Snelle cover ==
"17 miljoen mensen"

Single by Davina Michelle and Snelle
- Language: Dutch
- Released: 20 March 2020
- Genre: Pop
- Length: 1:47
- Label: Universal
- Songwriters: Eric van Tijn; Jochem Fluitsma; Frank Pels; Lars Bos

Snelle singles chronology
"Venus" (2020)	"17 miljoen mensen" (2020)	"Verliezen met jullie" (2020)

Davina Michelle singles chronology
"Beat Me" (2020)	"17 miljoen mensen" (2020)	"My Own World" (2020)

On 20 March 2020, a new version of the song, titled "17 miljoen mensen" was released by Dutch singer Davina Michelle and rapper Snelle. As their version was released during the COVID-19 pandemic, it featured lyrics written by Snelle which were adapted to it. The song came out during one of a four-streak concert by Michelle given at the empty Rotterdam Ahoy to comply with the rules.

Their updated version of the song was very commercially successful in the Netherlands. It debuted at number 24 on the Dutch Top 40 for the week of 28 March 2020. The following week it moved to its peak position of number one, where it stayed four consecutive weeks. With a duration of only 1 minute and 47 seconds, it became the shortest song ever to top the charts. It spent a total of twelve weeks on the chart, with its last position being number 40 on 13 June. On the Single Top 100, it peaked at a position of number one in its first week of charting, for the issue dated 28 March 2020. It spent the following four weeks on the top of the charts, before moving to a position of number two in its fifth week. It was last seen on the chart at a position of number 96 on the issue dated 1 August 2020. It also peaked at number 10 on the Belgian Ultratip charts.

=== Charts ===
==== Weekly charts ====
Chart performance for "17 miljoen mensen"
Chart (2020)	Peak position
Belgium (Ultratip)	10
Netherlands (Dutch Top 40)	1
Netherlands (Single Top 100)	1

==== Year-end charts ====
2020 year-end chart performance for "17 miljoen mensen"
Chart (2020)	Position
Netherlands (Dutch Top 40)	50
Netherlands (Single Top 100)	23

== Other cover versions ==
In 2006, Dutch singer Guus Meeuwis covered "15 miljoen mensen" as a B-side to his single "Ik wil dat ons land juicht". On 16 May 2018, he covered the song live at the RTL Late Night show. In February 2024, Dutch DJ and producer Edwin Evers made a new cover of the song, titled "18 miljoen mensen" and presented it on the third episode of his radio show Evers & Co on Radio 538.
