= Reünie =

Single by Snelle

from the album Vierentwintig
- Released: 19 July 2019
- Recorded: 2019
- Genre: Pop
- Length: 2:53
- Label: ROQ 'N Rolla Music
- Songwriters: Daan Ligtvoet; Okke Punt; Lars Bos
- Producer: Donda Nisha

Snelle singles chronology
"Plankgas" (2019)	"Reünie" (2019)	"Lippenstift" (2019)

Music video
- "Reünie" on YouTube

"Reünie" (lit. 'Reunion') is a song by Dutch rapper and singer Snelle included on his first studio album Vierentwintig (2019). The song was written by Daan Ligtvoet, Okke Punt and Lars Bos and produced by Donda Nisha. "Reünie" is an autobiographical song that features Snelle singing about the time he was bullied in high school due to his cleft lip and his dream to become a rapper. In the song, he proclaims how if it was not for the negative experience, he woulf not have become a singer.

"Reünie" was commercially successful, peaking at the top of the charts in the Netherlands and at number six on the charts in Flanders, Belgium. A music video was released on 19 July 2019 and features a young boy playing Snelle being bullied at school for his cleft lip.

== Background ==
"Reünie" was written by Daan Ligtvoet, Okke Punt and Lars Bos and produced by Donda Nisha and included on the album Vierentwintig (2019).

The song is autobiographical as it features Snelle singing about his youth, a time when he was bullied due to his cleft lip and the fact that he wanted to become a rapper. It also speaks about how he used the experience to advance with his music and is now the last one to laugh at a reunion with his bully.

In February 2020, the song won the Zapp Award in the category for Favorite Track NL. The same year in October, the song won a Buma NL Award.

== Commercial performance ==
The song was very commercially successful. For the week of 3 August 2019, it debuted at number 23 on the Dutch Top 40 chart. The following week, it moved to a position of number 8. It reached the peak of the chart on 28 September 2019 and it spent a week there. It also fared well on the Single Top 100, where it peaked at number one in its sixth week on the chart, on 31 August 2019. It spent a total of four weeks at the top. Overall, it spent a total of 73 weeks charting. It also peaked at number six on the Belgian Ultratop chart for the week of 2 November 2019, in its sixth week on the chart. On 11 September 2019, Snelle received a Platinum certification for the song, which was handed over to him by Thomas Acda during the show Beau van Erven Dorens. During the show, he further revealed how the song was about the exclusion in school groups and backhanded gossip.

"Reünie" appeared on the NPO Radio 2's Top 2000 list for six consecutive years, starting in 2019, with the highest position being 430 in 2020.

== Music video ==
A music video for the song was released on 19 July 2019, directed by Dion Ghijsen and Ricardo Paterno. It was partly filmed at the high school Hugo de Groot at Nachtegaalplein 53 in Charlois. The video is in line with the song's lyrics against bullying. To that end, it featured twelve year-old actor Jesse Schenk from Lelystad who also had a cleft lip and played younger Snelle in the video.

== Live performances ==
Snelle performed "Reünie" on 2 August 2019 at the 538 Gemist show. On 17 August 2019, he performed an orchestral version at the show Stephan's Pianobar by Qmusic Nederland. He performed it live on the VRT Muziek show in Flanders on 1 October 2019. He performed it live on 3FM on 6 November 2019. On 28 December 2019, he performed the song at NPO's 3FM show. Snelle performed the song live together with Thomas Acda at the Vrienden van Amstel 2020 concert on 24 January. He performed "Reünie" live at the Zapp Awards held on 5 March 2020.

Snelle performed the song live on 5 May 2020, Liberation Day in the Netherlands, live at NPO 3FM concert. Snelle also performed it live during his concert at SEA 2022 on 5 August. He performed it live again on NPO Radio 2 on 17 March 2024. He also performed the song live at the Concert at SEA on 7 August 2024. In 2025, he performed the song at NPO Radio 2 on 1 September.

During an episode of Beste Zangers 2025 on 4 October, rapper Typhoon performed a cover version of the song.

== Credits and personnel ==
Credits and personnel for the video are adapted from YouTube.

- Directed by - Dion Ghijsen & Ricardo Paterno
- Production Company - Pastrami Film Co
- Production & Casting - Nuray Kursun
- DoP - Sami El Hassani
- AC - Bart Hoveijn
- Gaffer - Ray van der Bas
- Styling - Cilly Rigters
- MUA - Desiree Schouten
- Set Dresser - Mikki Sindhunata
- PA - Alexander Belhadj & Catharina Molenaar
- Edit - Pastrami Film Co
- Grading - Wietse in De Grot

== Charts ==
=== Weekly charts ===
Chart performance for "Reünie"
Chart (2019)	Peak position
Belgium (Ultratop)	6
Netherlands (Dutch Top 40)	1
Netherlands (Single Top 100)	1

=== Year-end charts ===
2019 year-end chart performance for "Reünie"
Chart (2019)	Position
Belgium (Ultratop)	76
Netherlands (Dutch Top 40)	19
Netherlands (Single Top 100)	8

2020 year-end chart performance for "Reünie"
Chart (2020)	Position
Belgium (Ultratop)	77
Netherlands (Single Top 100)	24

=== Decade-end charts ===
Decade-end chart performance for "Reünie"
Chart (2010–2019)	Position
Netherlands (Single Top 100)	73

== See also ==
- List of Dutch Top 40 number-one singles of 2019
