= Rolf Sanchez =

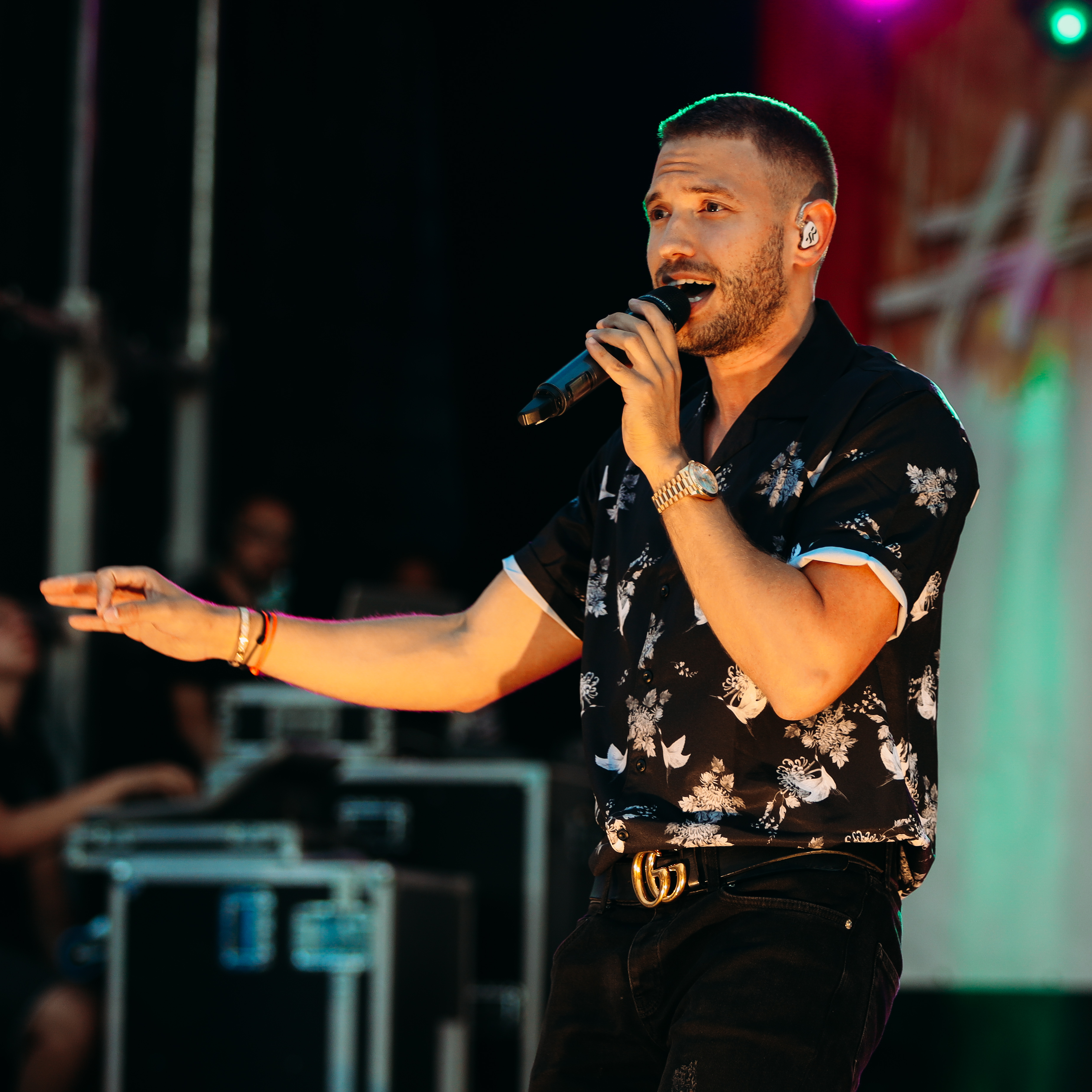
- Rolf Sanchez performing on stage (2019)

Background information
- Born: Roelof Johannes Wienk; 3 July 1991 (age 35); Ede, Netherlands
- Genres: Latin, pop, salsa
- Occupation: Singer
- Member of: The Streamers
- Website: rolf-music.com/en/

Roelof Johannes Wienk (born 3 July 1991), known professionally as Rolf Sanchez, is a Dutch singer from Ede, Gelderland.

Born to a Dominican mother and a Dutch father, Sanchez performed in the fourth season of the Dutch X Factor in 2011. He had three number-one singles on the Billboard Tropical Airplay chart as well as one number-one single in the Netherlands, "Más más más".

== Career ==
Roelof Wienk was born to a Dominican mother and a Dutch father in Ede, along with a younger brother. He went by "Rolf" as a child because he thought it was a nicer-sounding name. He learned to speak Spanish from his mother at a young age.

In 2011, Rolf Wienk took part in the fourth season of the Dutch version of the television show X Factor, where he took third place. Despite not finishing first, he still received a record deal. In the same year, his debut single "Ave Maria", a Spanish-language cover by David Bisbal, was released.

In 2013, the singer went to the Dominican Republic to focus on Spanish-language songs. He started to go by "Rolf Sanchez" because it was difficult for Spanish speakers to pronounce his Dutch last name Wienk.

He has achieved three number one songs on the Billboard Tropical Airplay chart with "Por si no te vuelvo a ver", "Que se siente", and "Vas a entender". He was nominated for "Best New Artist" at the 2015 Premios Juventud Awards and New Artist of the Year at the 2016 Lo Nuestro Awards. From 2015 to 2018, Sanchez lived in Miami, but he said he did not enjoy his time living there.

In 2019, Sanchez appeared in the Dutch singing program Beste Zangers. In the show, he sang "Pa' olvidarte" together with Emma Heesters. The song was well received and reached second place in both the Dutch Top 40 and in the Single Top 100. He was also seen that same year as an actor, playing the role of Carlos in the film Verliefd op Cuba.

In August 2020 he reached the number one spot in the Dutch Top 40 with the single "Más más más".

== Discography ==
=== Albums ===
- Mi viaje (2022) – No. 2 Netherlands

=== Singles ===
List of singles, with selected chart positions
Title	Year	Peak chart positions			
Title	Year	NLD Dutch Top 40	NLD Single Top 100	BEL (FL)	US Tropical
"Ave Maria"	2011	—	73	—	—
"Por si no te vuelvo a ver"	2015	—	—	—	1
"Que se siente"	2015	—	—	—	1
"Vas a entender"	2016	—	—	—	1
"Paso a paso"	2017	—	—	—	16
"Te va a doler" (with Farruko)	2017	—	—	—	14
"Pa olvidarte" (with Emma Heesters)	2019	2	2	—	—
"Como tu"	2020	22	57	—	—
"Más más más"	2020	1	1	8	—
"Ik wens"	2020	—	—	—	—
"Ven ven"	2021	10	23	—	—
"Een moment" (with Marco Borsato & John Ewbank)	2021	26	12	—	—
"Hef je glas" (with Marco Borsato & John Ewbank)	2021	24	32	24	—
"Increible" (with Kris Kross Amsterdam)	2021	32	63	—	—
"Doe nou niet" (with LA$$A)	2021	—	—	—	—
"Te amare"	2021	—	—	—	—
"Manana" (with Bilal Wahib)	2022	—	38	—	—
"Missen zou" (with Thomas Acda & Kraantje Pappie)	2022	27	67	—	—
"Darte un beso"	2022	12	67	—	—
"Zin in de zomer man" (with Bizzey & Kraantje Pappie)	2023	17	8	—	—
"Ik denk aan jou"	2023	—	—	—	—
"Un chance"	2024	34	—	—	—
"Contigo" (with Emma Heesters)	2024	10	—	—	—
"Voor de straten" (with Ronnie Flex)	2026	—	40	—	—

==== Featured singles ====
Title	Year	Peak chart positions	
Title	Year	NLD Dutch Top 40	NLD Single Top 100
"Voy a bailar" (Ali B feat. Boef, Rolf Sanchez & RedOne)	2017	9	13
"Ai" (Tabitha feat. Rolf Sanchez & Poke)	2019	—	28
