= Interpolis =

Dutch insurance company

N.V. Interpolis BTL
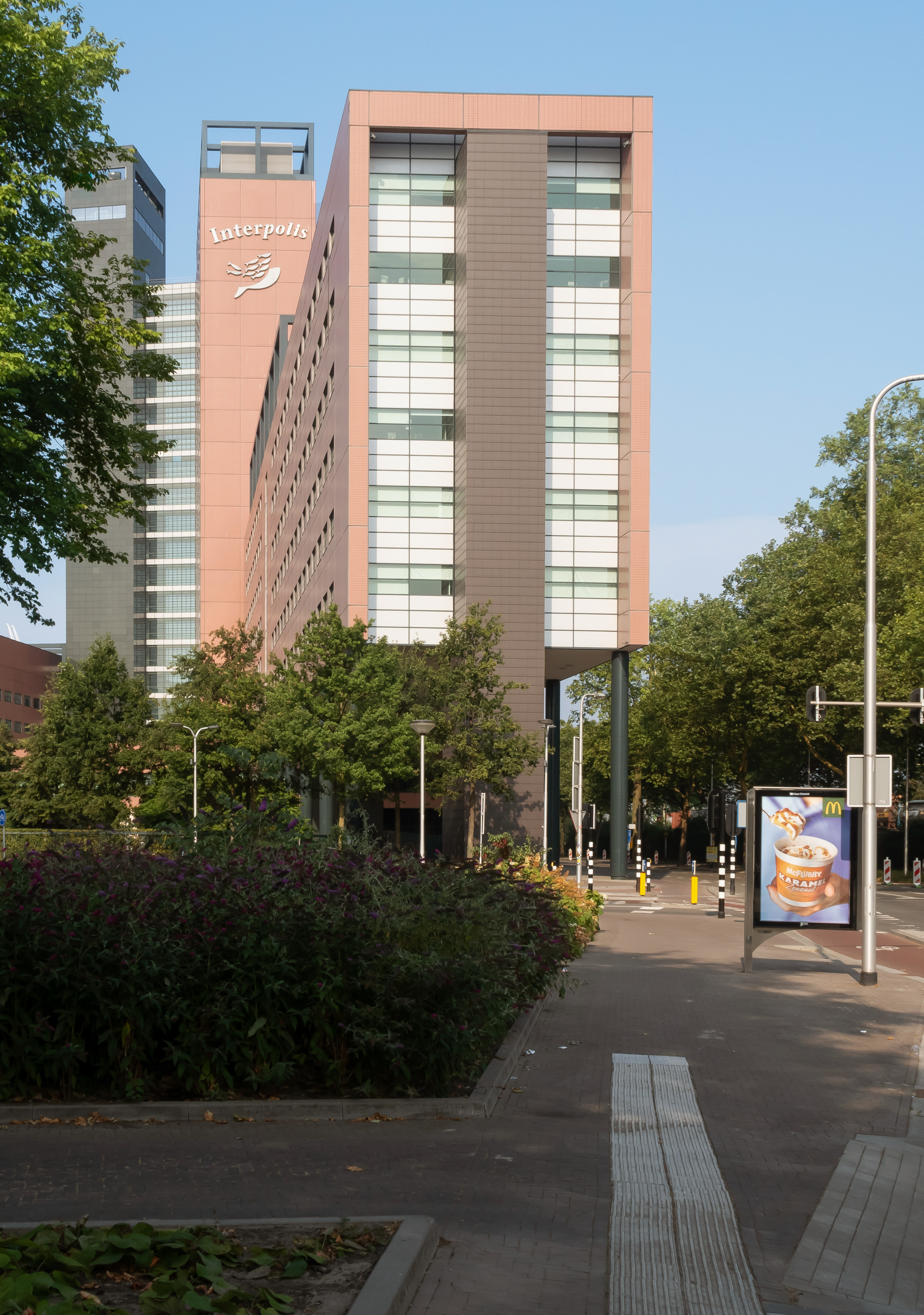
- Interpolis main office in Tilburg, the Netherlands
- Type: Subsidiary
- Industry: Insurance
- Founded: 1969; 57 years ago
- Headquarters: Tilburg,, the Netherlands
- Products: Health insurance Life insurance Property insurance Casualty insurance
- Number of employees: 2,500+
- Parent: Achmea
- Website: www.interpolis.nl

Interpolis is a major Dutch insurance company operating across the Netherlands. The company has gained wide recognition with its advertising campaign "Interpolis.Crystal clear". Besides financial compensation, Interpolis also offers compensation in kind.

Interpolis was an early adopter of hot desking, flexible office hours, and working from home.

== History ==
Interpolis came into existence in 1969 after a merger between the life insurance company BTL and four mutual non-life insurance companies: ABTB in Arnhem, LLTB in Roermond, LTB in Leiden and NCB in Tilburg (which were part of the regional class-based organizations of the Katholieke Nederlandse Boeren- en Tuindersbond (KNBTB) (Catholic Dutch farmers and market-gardeners union)). Also in 1969 Interpolis, together with the Coöperatieve Centrale Boerenleenbank - a forerunner of the Rabobank -, founded the finance company DLL (formerly known as De Lage Landen). That organization is still a part of the Rabobank.

Three other mergers followed: with Hagelunie (1972), De Twaalf Gewesten (1985) and Sterpolis (1993). In 1990 mergers between banks and insurance companies became permitted, after which the Rabobank acquired almost all the shares of Interpolis. The Catholic class-based organizations, united in the KNBTB, retained their controlling interest until 2000. After the merger with Commit Arbo (2000) and the take-over of Relan (2001), Interpolis expanded its insurance activities to include old-age provisions and absenteeism management.

In 2005 Interpolis merged with Achmea, part of the European insurance group Eureko. The Rabobank exchanged Interpolis for 37% of the shares in Eureko. Since the merger Interpolis is part of Achmea, the largest insurance group in the Netherlands.

== Interpolis office concept ==
In addition to insurance, Interpolis is also known for its special outlook on work. The company operates a hot desking office where no one at Interpolis has their own fixed place of work. The employees can select a place of work that is best suited to them and to the work that they do. Special areas called ‘club houses’ have also been created at the Interpolis head office, each with its own particular atmosphere. In these club houses the Interpolis employees can combine various daily activities, such as working, consulting, meeting people, relaxing and eating.

The flexible working concept of activity-based working led to a cultural transition at Interpolis. That is because flexible working is not just a matter of moving some furniture around. Flexible working must also become embedded in the way you think and act. Employees at Interpolis do not have to clock in. The motto at Interpolis is: as long as the work gets done. Whether that is done from home or at the office is something the employees can decide for themselves. Interpolis is a pioneer of teleworking in the Netherlands. At the moment about 2,500 employees work from home several days a week.

== Abbreviations ==
- ABTB = Aartsdiocesane Boeren - en Tuindersbond = Archdiocesan farmers and market gardeners union
- BTL = Boeren en Tuinders Levensverzekeringen N.V. = farmers and market gardeners life insurance company
- LLTB = Limburgse Land- en Tuinbouwbond = Limburg agricultural and market gardening union
- LTB = vermoedelijk R.K. Diocesane Land - en Tuinbouwhogeschool in het Bisdom Haarlem = probably the Catholic diocesan agricultural and market gardening college in the bishopric of Haarlem
- NCB = Noordbrabantse Christelijke Boerenbond = Noordbrabant Christian farmers union
