= Smoorverliefd (song) =

Single by Snelle

from the album Lars
- Released: 10 January 2020
- Recorded: 2019
- Genre: Pop
- Length: 2:58
- Label: ROQ 'N Rolla Music
- Songwriters: Okke Punt; Lars Bos
- Producer: Donda Nisha

Snelle singles chronology
"Lippenstift" (2019)	"Smoorverliefd" (2020)	"17 miljoen mensen" (2020)

Music video
- "Smoorverliefd" on YouTube

"Smoorverliefd" is a song by Dutch rapper and singer Snelle included on his fourth studio album Lars (2021). The song was very commercially successful, peaking at number one on the Dutch Top 40 and Single Top 100. It also peaked at number two on the Belgian Ultratop chart. The song was developed in collaboration with Dutch insurance company Interpolis to warn youth about the dangers of texting while biking.

A music video was released for the song on 10 January 2020, directed by Wefilm. The video is meant as a warning to young people against using the phone while biking. To that end, it shows the love story of a boy and a girl and features a tragic end with the message "Don't let your telephone break your heart".

== Background ==
"Smoorverliefd" was written by Okke Punt and Snelle (Lars Bos) and produced by Donda Nisha. It was included on his fourth studio album Lars (2021). He premiered the song on 10 January 2020, during an appearance at the Bitterzoet club in Amsterdam. On the first day of its release, the song was streamed more than 460.000, which broke his record at the time. On 14 January 2020, Snelle appeared on the Op1 show to further discuss dangers related to messaging while biking in greater depth.

Snelle was approached by insurance company Interpolis to have a chat with young people who suffered an accident due to using their phones while biking and was asked to raise awareness on the issue. He shared how he had to speak to a young person who could not pursue a judo career anymore because of an accident. Following the conversations, Snelle started was inspired: "How can I contribute to this, I have influence. I wanted to do something and that was write a song. We wanted to dive into the world young people experience. What was I thinking when I was their age, what could I use to attract their attention? And yes, what is that, it is your first crush, your first girlfriend, your first kiss." For the purpose of the song and its clip, the team came up with the hashtag #PhoNo. The song lyrically discusses two young people who have a big crush on each other. A behind-the-scenes video on the creation of the song was released on 10 January 2020.

== Chart performnace ==
The song debuted at number 18 on the Dutch Top 40 chart on 18 January 2020. It moved to its peak position of number one in the following week, where it stayed for additional two weeks. It spent a total of 17 weeks on the chart, last being seen at a position of number 38 on 9 May 2020. It fared better on the Single Top 100 chart, where it peaked at number one in its first week on 18 January 2020 where it stayed four weeks. It later spent a total of 29 weeks on the chart, before falling out after 1 August 2020. In the Flanders region of Belgium, the song peaked at number two in its seventh week on the chart, for the issue dated 7 March 2020.

At the year-end list Top 2000 compiled by NPO Radio 2, the song appeared for three consecutive years, at numbers 1315, 1824 and 1973 in 2021, 2022 and 2023, respectively.

== Music video ==
The music video for the song was directed by the production company Wefilm and had its premiere on 10 January 2020. It shows the love story of a young pair between 14 and 16 years old. The story however, has a tragic ending due to the use of a mobile phone while biking. Snelle said during an interview that he believes the video to be a better way of reaching kids rather than saying it to them.

It opens with a boy and a girl, played by actors Walt Klink and Faye Kimmijser, meeting at school. The guy is then seen following the girl on his bike as she is going home by car. The two are shown messaging each other at school and from home. They are also shown biking and spending time alone, kissing at home and dancing in their rooms. Towards the second part of the song, a car crashes into the boy while he is texting the girl. Snelle appears at the end, singing the song. The text "Do not let your phone break your heart" with the hashtag #PhoNo appears at the end. The video received 2 million views in the first week of its release. A writer of VRT NWS described it as "very touching". Sanne van Rij from LINDA. called the video "very strong" and said that "Interpolis knows how to convey a message in a strong way".

== Live performances and cover versions ==
To promote the song, Snelle performed it live during several televised appearances and concerts. On 18 February 2020, he performed the song live at De 538 Ochtendshow. On 10 July 2020, he performed the song live at the Vlaanderen Feest show in Flanders. Snelle performed an acoustic version of "Smorverliefd" at the 3 sterren camping show on 10 November 2020. He performed the song live at the Vrienden van Amstel concert together with Zoe Tauran on 1 February 2024. On 17 March 2024, Snelle performed the song on NPO Radio 2.

Dutch acoustic cover band BENR performed their own version of the song and uploaded it on their YouTube channel on 21 February 2020. Dutch singer Jaap Reesema covered the song during a performance on NPO Radio 2 on 4 August 2022. Dutch singer Paul de Leeuw covered the song during a performance at the show Beste Zangers 2025 on 4 October.

== Charts ==
=== Weekly charts ===
Chart performance for "Smoorverliefd"
Chart (2020)	Peak position
Belgium (Ultratop)	2
Netherlands (Dutch Top 40)	1
Netherlands (Single Top 100)	1

=== Year-end charts ===
2020 year-end chart performance for "Smoorverliefd"
Chart (2020)	Position
Belgium (Ultratop)	22
Netherlands (Dutch Top 40)	23
Netherlands (Single Top 100)	8

== Credits and personnel ==
Credits and personnel for the video are adapted from YouTube.

- Concept - Wefilm Concepts
- Creative director - Roel Welling
- Creative - Glenn van de Dood
- Creative - Boudewijn Bosman
- Strategy - Ruben Cusell
- Production company - Wefilm
- Head of production - Rogier Sol
- Managing director - Bas Welling
- Director - Lennart Verstegen
- Producer - Beau van Assem
- Boy - Walt Klink
- Girl - Faye Kimmijser
- Casting - Nuray Kursun
- Production manager - Emeline Bakker
- First A.D. - Thom Arends
- First A.D. - Pieter Veenhof
- Director of photography - Stephan Polman
- Focus puller - Pancsi Puts
- Focus puller - Vincent van Willegen
- 2nd A.C - Luc Roes
- Gaffer - Paul Wilens
- Best boy - Karina van den Berg
- Electrician - Ryan Shaminee
- Electrician - Mees Swinkels
- Key grip - Mike Laureys - Gripwise
- Stylist - Minke Lunter
- Styling assistant - Luna van den Berg
- Styling Snelle - Cillie Rigters
- Make up & hair Snelle - Linsey Ladru
- Art director - Loïs Beker
- Assistant art department - Eefje Helmus
- Picture Vehicles - Car casting Holland
- Sound on set - Noah Pepper
- Locatie manager - Rob Ijpelaar
- Location scouting - Marie Lou - Loucations
- Production assistant - Bauke Boneschansker
- Production assistant - Gess Sumter
- Production assistant - Cézanne van der Wiel
- Production assistant - Sebastiaan Barten
- Caterer - Nanja Theus
- Director documentary - Dennis Lubbers
- Editor - Patrick Schonewille
- VFX - The Outpost
- Color grading - Barry Clarke - Captcha!
- Sound design - Haaifaai
- Project leader: Vincent Hagen
- Responsible Interpolis - Kim Smulders, Bart de Vries, Miquette Vossen

== See also ==
- List of Dutch Top 40 number-one singles of 2020
