= Davina Michelle =

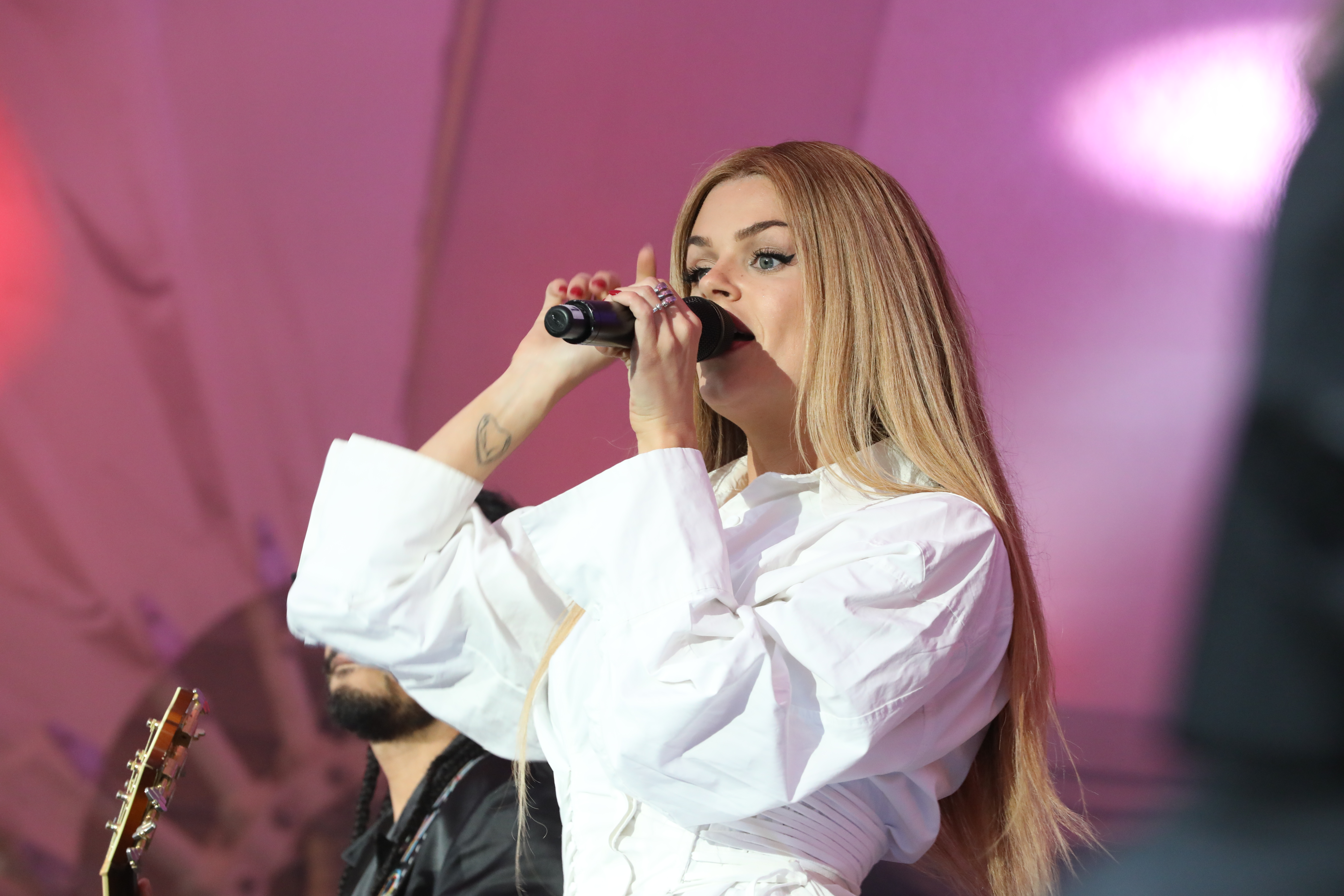
- Davina Michelle 2025

Background information
- Born: Michelle Davina Hoogendoorn; 12 November 1995 (age 30); Nieuwerkerk aan den IJssel, Netherlands
- Occupations: Singer, YouTuber
- Years active: 2017–present
- Website: Official website

YouTube information
- Channel: Davina Michelle
- Years active: 2017–present
- Genre: Music
- Subscribers: 1.64 million
- Views: 299 million
- Last updated: 27 September 2024

Michelle Davina Hoogendoorn (born 12 November 1995), known by her stage name Davina Michelle, is a Dutch singer and YouTuber.

In 2018, her cover of the song "Duurt te lang" reached the number one spot on the Dutch Top 40, becoming the first woman in 11 years to do so with a Dutch-language song. "Hoe het danst", her 2019 collaboration with Marco Borsato and Armin van Buuren, also reached number one and became the first Dutch-language song to record over 100 million streams on Spotify.

== Career ==
Named after Michelle Pfeiffer and Davina McCall, Hoogendoorn comes from a family with three children. Around the age of four, she was a big fan of Britney Spears. She made it her goal to become the next Britney Spears, but kept this to herself. In secondary school, encouraged by her music teacher, she began performing for the webcam, but did not post these performances for her classmates. She asked her parents for a microphone and better software to record her voice for her eighteenth birthday. She posted the recordings on social media, and her friends and family were excited about the results. Still, she also caught the attention of the songwriter and production group Sub-Bass Music Group, who saw potential in her.

In 2016, Hoogendoorn participated in the fifth season of Idols. During her audition, she sang Jessie J's "Nobody's Perfect", after which she went on to the theater round and the duet round, where she was eliminated.

In February 2017, Hoogendoorn started her own YouTube-channel under the pseudonym Davina Michelle, where she would upload her cover version of an English-language song every week. On 21 August 2017, she posted her cover of "What About Us" by the American singer Pink. In October, Glamour posted a video review by Pink where she called the cover amazing and said "That's better than I will ever sound". Hoogendoorn's video went viral, after which she performed multiple times in TV programs like RTL Late Night and De Wereld Draait Door and in various venues in the United States. As of October 2024, the video has over 24 million views and Hoogendoorn’s own channel has over 1 million subscribers. She also got to open for Pink during her Beautiful Trauma Tour in the Hague in 2019.

In December 2017, Hoogendoorn published the single "Ga" in cooperation with the Efteling and Sterre (played by Lilo van den Bosch). It served as the official soundtrack for the musical Sprookjessprokkelaar, created by the Efteling.

In 2018, Hoogendoorn participated in the eleventh season of the AVROTROS reality show Beste Zangers. In the fifth episode, she performed a cover of the song "Duurt te lang" by rapper Glen Faria (also known as MC Fit). Two days after the episode was broadcast, the song reached the first place of most downloaded songs on iTunes in the Netherlands. Later in 2018, it reached the number 1 spot in the Dutch Top 40, the Mega Top 50 and the Dutch Single Top 100. In November 2018, the single was certified gold.

In March 2020, Hoogendoorn performed four "empty concerts" at the Rotterdam Ahoy during the beginning of the COVID-19 pandemic. She performed "17 miljoen mensen" with Snelle, an alteration of "15 miljoen mensen" by Fluitsma & Van Tijn. It was released as a single and reached number one on the Dutch Top 40 for four weeks. At one minute and 47 seconds long, it became the shortest number-one hit in Dutch history.

On 18 May 2021, Hoogendoorn performed her single "Sweet Water" at the first semi-final of the Eurovision Song Contest 2021, held in her birth city Rotterdam, as part of an interval act titled "The Power of Water" alongside Dutch actress Thekla Reuten.

On 5 September 2021, Hoogendoorn performed the Dutch national anthem ahead of the 2021 Dutch Grand Prix at Circuit Zandvoort, the first Formula 1 race to be held in the country since 1985. She repeated her performance for the podium ceremony after Dutch driver Max Verstappen won the event. Her song "Beat Me" was supposed to be the official theme for the 2020 Grand Prix which was cancelled because of the COVID-19 pandemic. On 23rd August 2026, Hogendoorn performed the Dutch national anthem for the 2026 Dutch Grand Prix, the final Formula 1 race to be held at Circuit Zandvoort.

== Discography ==
=== Albums ===
Title	Details	Peak chart positions		Certifications
Title	Details	NL	BEL (FL)	Certifications
My Own World	Released: 21 August 2020; Label: 8ball	4	102	NVPI: Gold
Gold Plated Love	Released: 20 May 2022; Label: 8ball	—	10	
Higher	Released: 27 September 2024; Label: 8ball	23	78	
Afterpart1	Released: 25 September 2026; Label: 8ball	28	114	

=== Singles ===
Title	Year	Peak chart positions			Certifications	Album
Title	Year	NL 40	NL 100	BEL (FL)	Certifications	Album
"Duurt te lang"	2018	1	1	51	NVPI: 5× Platinum	Non-album single
"Skyward"	2019	7	21	—	NVPI: Platinum	My Own World
"Hoe het danst" (with Marco Borsato and Armin van Buuren)	2019	1	2	1	NVPI: 3× Platinum	Non-album single
"Better Now"	2019	19	60	—	NVPI: Gold	My Own World
"Beat Me"	2020	9	18	—	NVPI: Platinum	My Own World
"17 miljoen mensen" (with Snelle)	2020	1	1	60	NVPI: Platinum	Non-album single
"My Own World"	2020	17	46	—		My Own World
"Liar"	2020	39	tip20	—		My Own World
"Nobody Is Perfect"	2021	26	49	—		Non-album single
"Sweet Water"	2021	13	29	—		Gold Plated Love
"Hold On" (with Armin van Buuren)	2021	13	51	―		Higher
"Hyper"	2021	20	58	—		Gold Plated Love
"No Angel"	2022	—	tip11	—		Non-album singles
"I Love Me More"	2022	34	91	—		Non-album singles
"January Without You"	2022	30	tip1	—		Non-album singles
"Dating the Devil"	2023	tip1	tip30	—		Non-album singles
"17"	2023	26	—	—		Non-album singles
"This Is My Life"	2023	—	—	—		Non-album singles
"Heartbeat"	2023	17	43	—		Higher
"I Said No Sir"	2024	34	—	—		Higher
"All Is Ours"	2024	—	—	—		Higher
"I Won't Let Go"	2024	13	—	—		Higher
"—" denotes a recording that did not chart or was not released in that territory.
