= Fluitsma & Van Tijn =

Dutch writing duo

Information
- Awards: Golden Harp 1997

Bois
Fluitsma
- Born: Jochem Fluitsma; 1 June 1958 (age 67); Amsterdam, Netherlands
- Born: Eric van Tijn; 2 November 1956 (age 69); Amsterdam, Netherlands

Fluitsma & Van Tijn (Dutch pronunciation: [ˈflœytsmaː ʔɛɱ vɑn ˈtɛin]) is a Dutch writing duo made up of Jochem Fluitsma (born in Amsterdam on 1 June 1958) and Eric van Tijn (born in Amsterdam on 2 November 1956).

The two gained popularity in 1996, when they wrote the song "15 miljoen mensen" for a commercial for Postbank N.V.. The song quickly became very popular which led to a longer recording. The single was very commercially successful, peaking at number one on the Dutch Top 40 chart and the Singles Top 100 where it stayed for two consecutive weeks.

They won the Golden Harp Dutch music award in 1997.
