= Suzan & Freek =

Dutch musical duo

- Suzan & Freek performing in 2026

Background information
- Origin: Groenlo, Gelderland, Netherlands
- Genre: Pop
- Years active: 2014–present
- Label: Sony Music
- Members: Suzan Stortelder; Freek Rikkerink
- Website: www.suzanenfreek.nl

Suzan & Freek are a Dutch musical duo formed in Groenlo, Netherlands. The now husband-and-wife couple of Suzan Stortelder and Freek Rikkerink have released music together beginning in 2014.

The duo first went viral when The Chainsmokers shared their cover of "Don't Let Me Down" in 2016. Their first original song, "Als het avond is", was released in 2018 and reached number one on the Dutch Top 40 in 2019, eventually being certified Platinum. Their debut album Gedeeld door ons entered the charts at number two in both the Netherlands and Belgium, and their next two albums both reached number one in the Netherlands. Closely associated with the Achterhoek region, the duo has been credited with aiding the newfound popularity of Dutch-language pop music in the Netherlands and Flanders in the 2020s.

On 27 May 2025, the duo announced that Rikkerink was diagnosed with terminal lung cancer and suspended all activities. On 13 June, the duo resumed music activities following a positive prognosis for Rikkerink's condition.

== History ==
Suzan Stortelder and Freek Rikkerink met in 2007 in the music room of the Scholengemeenschap Marianum in Groenlo and began talking on MSN. Though Suzan was a year older and in a higher class, they played in a school band together and soon began a relationship.

Afterwards, they continued their studies as Suzan pursued architecture at TU Delft, while Freek studied commercial economics in Tilburg. They first performed in public together in 2009 at De Twee Bruggen campsite in Winterswijk. When the campsite owner asked them what name they wanted to be introduced as, they said simply their names "Suzan & Freek", and it stuck.

In October 2014, Suzan & Freek began posting covers of popular songs on a weekly basis under the title "De Minuut". The first was Mr. Probz' "Nothing Really Matters", which was praised by Mr. Probz himself. In 2016, their cover of "Don't Let Me Down" went viral after The Chainsmokers shared it, helping the cover receive millions of views and streams. Their first EP, Glass House Sessions, was released in September 2017, featuring five covers.

Their first original song, "Als het avond is", was released on 2 November 2018. It entered the Dutch Top 40 at No. 30 in December, and was certified Gold in March. After 17 weeks, it reached number one, breaking a 48-year-old record previously held by Les Poppys' "Non, non, rien n'a changé" (14 weeks) for the longest climb to number one in chart history. After the song reached number one, they both left their jobs – Suzan as an architect, Freek at a record label – to focus on music full-time. Their second single "Blauwe dag" was released on 28 June 2019 and reached No. 4 on the charts. Their debut album Gedeeld door ons was released on 27 September 2019 and reached number two in the Netherlands. It was certified Gold after five days. It would be certified Platinum and remain on the charts for 147 weeks.

The duo released the single "Weg van jou" in May 2020 during the COVID-19 pandemic, although the song was written well before. In August, they released "De overkant", a collaboration with Dutch rapper Snelle, which was a tribute to the Achterhoek region. Suzan & Freek participated in season 13 of Beste Zangers, which aired beginning in September 2020. Their second album Dromen in kleur was released on 29 October 2021. It reached number one on the Dutch Albums Chart in April 2022 after the duo performed two sold-out concerts at the Ziggo Dome in Amsterdam.

A documentary about the couple, Suzan & Freek: Tussen Jou en Mij, premiered on Netflix in January 2023. Their third album, Iemand van vroeger, was released on 22 September 2023. It debuted at number one in the Netherlands. The duo not only sold out four November 2023 concerts at the Ziggo Dome, but also one at the Sportpaleis in Antwerp, Belgium.

In May 2024, the duo released the single "Verleden tijd" which became their fifteenth top 40 hit, alongside the announcement of six concerts in the Ziggo Dome for May and June 2025. In January 2025, they released the single "Ken je dat gevoel", followed by "Batterij" in May 2025.

On 27 May 2025, the duo announced that they would cease all activities because of Freek Rikkerink's terminal lung cancer diagnosis. Their three remaining Ziggo Dome shows that week were all cancelled. Initially, the duo withdrew from their upcoming roles as judges on the upcoming season of The Voice of Holland, set to air in January 2026, but rejoined the panel following a more positive diagnosis in Freek's cancer. On 13 June, the duo announced that they would return to the stage after consulting with doctors, beginning on 27 June at the Concert at Sea.

In October 2025, Suzan & Freek announced ten concerts at the GelreDome in Arnhem for May 2026, which all sold out immediately. They also released "Niemand", written in August as their first song since Freek's diagnosis. Their May 2026 concerts sold over 400,000 tickets, breaking Marco Borsato's venue record of 325,000 set in 2006.

== Personal lives ==
Suzan Stortelder was born on 15 June 1992 in Zieuwent and Freek Rikkerink was born on 29 March 1993 in Harreveld.

The couple were engaged in Berlin in July 2022. Their wedding took place in December 2023, in the German town of Goch.

On 27 May 2025, the duo announced that Rikkerink was diagnosed with terminal lung cancer, and that they are expecting their first child. The two immediately ceased all their performances. On 4 June, the couple wrote that Rikkerink had begun life-extending medication with the possibility of surviving for multiple years. On 30 November 2025, the couple's child, a boy named Sef, was born.

== Members ==
- Suzan Stortelder – vocals and piano
- Freek Rikkerink – vocals and guitar

== Discography ==
=== Albums ===
List of studio albums, with selected chart positions
Title	Year	Peak chart positions		
Title	Year	NLD	BEL (Fl)	GRE
Gedeeld door ons	2019	2	1	—
Dromen in kleur	2021	1	2	68
Iemand van vroeger	2023	1	1	—
Pijnstiller	2026	1	2	—
"—" denotes an album that did not chart.

=== EPs ===
List of EPs, with selected chart positions
Title	Year	Peak chart positions
Title	Year	BEL (Fl)
Glass House Sessions	2017	—
Beste zangers – Seizoen 2020	2020	81
Liefde voor muziek 2022	2022	118

=== Singles ===
List of singles, with selected chart positions
Title	Year	Peak chart positions			Album
Title	Year	NLD Dutch Top 40	NLD Single Top 100	BEL (Fl)	Album
"Als het avond is"	2018	1	3	4	Gedeeld door ons
"Blauwe dag"	2019	4	12	5	Gedeeld door ons
"Mag ik daar even stil bij staan"	2019	—	55	—	Gedeeld door ons
"Deze is voor mij"	2020	19	47	27	Gedeeld door ons
"Weg van jou"	2020	12	20	21	Dromen in kleur
"De overkant" (with Snelle)	2020	2	6	11	Dromen in kleur
"Papa"	2020	27	10	—	Beste zangers - Seizoen 2020
"Goud"	2021	2	4	17	Dromen in kleur
"Onderweg naar later"	2021	10	8	36	Dromen in kleur
"Dromen in kleur"	2021	15	23	27	Dromen in kleur
"Honderd keer"	2022	3	12	48	Iemand van vroeger
"Dit is voor jou"	2022	—	—	44	Liefde voor muziek 2022
"Kwijt"	2022	5	12	30	Iemand van vroeger
"Slapeloosheid"	2023	7	9	7	Iemand van vroeger
"Nooit meer regen"	2023	18	29	20	Iemand van vroeger
"Vas-y (Ga maar)" (with Claude)	2023	5	8	44	Iemand van vroeger
"De helft van mij"	2023	—	—	15	Iemand van vroeger
"Verleden tijd"	2024	35	45	34	Non-album singles
"Ken je dat gevoel"	2025	12	16	10	Non-album singles
"Batterij"	2025	35	16	—	Non-album singles
"Lichtje branden"	2025	2	6	—	Dromen in kleur
"Niemand"	2025	3	1	4	Pijnstiller
"Halverwege"	2026	13	19	16	Pijnstiller
"Pijnstiller"	2026	1	2	3	Pijnstiller
