= Hot desking =

Office organization system

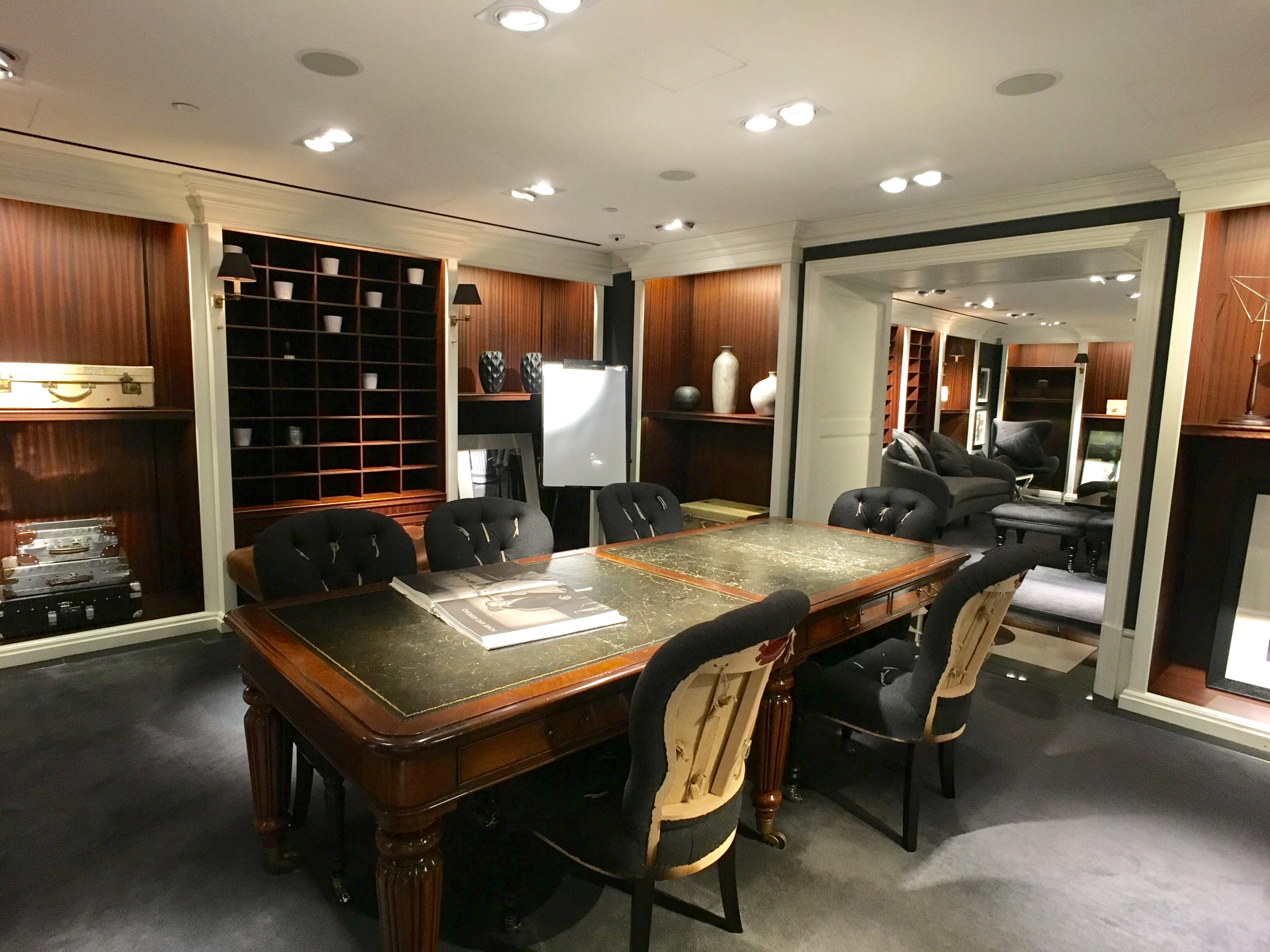
A hot desk area in Causeway Bay

Hot desking (sometimes called "non-reservation-based hoteling" or "desk sharing") is a work office organization system where each space is available for any worker, rather than reserved for a specific worker, so different workers may use the same spot along the day or week. The "desk" in the name refers to a table or other work space being shared by multiple workers on different shifts as opposed to every staff member having their own personal desk. A primary motivation for hot-desking is cost reduction through space savings—up to 30% in some cases. Hot desking is especially valuable in cities where real estate prices are high.

== Usage ==
=== Traditional offices ===
Hot desking is often found in workplaces with flexible schedules for employees, where not all employees are actually working in an office at the same time. Employees in such workplaces use existing offices only occasionally or for short periods, which leaves offices vacant part of the time. By sharing offices, employees make more efficient use of space and resources. However, hot desking comes with disadvantages, including a lack of permanent space, an unclear work hierarchy, and possibly inconvenient communication between members of a team. For some employees, hot-desking may be hard to get used to, as people have different ways of using a desk (adjusting the chair height, moving around decorations, keeping the space tidy).

An alternative version of hot desking is possible where employees have multiple tasks and multiple employees may require a certain work station, but not all at the same time. Thus a permanent work station can be made available to any worker as and when needed (also known as a "touchdown" space), with employees sharing it. This could be for a single element of one's work, for example, when a sales employee needs an office for a client meeting, but does not otherwise need a personal office. Another example is when employees need to perform specific tasks at work stations created for those tasks in an assembly line fashion. There, the individual work stations are not set up as personal office space. A collection of such workstations is sometimes called a mobility centre.

With the growth of mobility services, hot desking can also include the routing of voice and other messaging services to any location where the user is able to log into a corporate network. Therefore, their telephone number, their email, and instant messaging can be routed to their location on the network and no longer to just their physical desk.

The COVID-19 pandemic resulted in remote work becoming more common, with many employees only coming into the office for part of the week. This increased reliance on hot desking, to avoid paying for unused desk space.

==== The future of hot desking ====
According to a June 2024 Bloomberg article, American workplace seating arrangements have shifted in recent years. In 2019, the vast majority (95%) of office seating was assigned, with only 5% unassigned. By 2022, this had changed somewhat, with 81% assigned and 19% unassigned, reflecting a trend towards more flexible workspaces. However, data from 2023 suggests a slight increase in assigned seating (83%), potentially indicating a move away from fully unassigned ("hot desking") arrangements.

As of 2024, around 60% of North American companies have adopted desk sharing or hoteling. It's helped reduce the number of empty desks and made better use of space, especially since most offices are still only 40–60% full on a typical day.

According to a 2022 study, 92% of coworking spaces include hot desks for rent.

== Origin ==
The term "hot desking" is thought to derive from the naval practice of hot racking, where sailors on different shifts share the same bunks.

== Criticisms ==
Academic research suggests that hot-desking may negatively affect physical and mental health, increase conflicts between co-workers, compromise performance on tasks that require privacy and focus, and limit workplace personalisation.

For example, open-plan offices with hot-desking may serve as a medium for the spread of flu and viruses. In addition, the conflicts between co-workers due to space contestation may point towards workplace bullying, which compromise mental health of workers.

A study that collected and analyzed Reddit user discussions about implementing a hottable format in the office found that only 0.9% of the comments were positive, while 67.0% were negative.

=== Related legal disputes ===
In 2018, a disabled manager at the UK House of Commons was provided with an adapted workstation to accommodate chronic neck and back conditions. However, because of office overcrowding, management permitted other employees to occupy the station during her short absences between June and September 2018, which led to conflict over access. After she left a polite note requesting that colleagues refrain from using the space, the request was disregarded and supervisors initiated disciplinary action, deeming it unreasonable. In 2022, she subsequently succeeded in her claim before an employment tribunal in central London.

== See also ==
- Activity-based working
