= Snelle =

Dutch rapper and singer (born 1995)

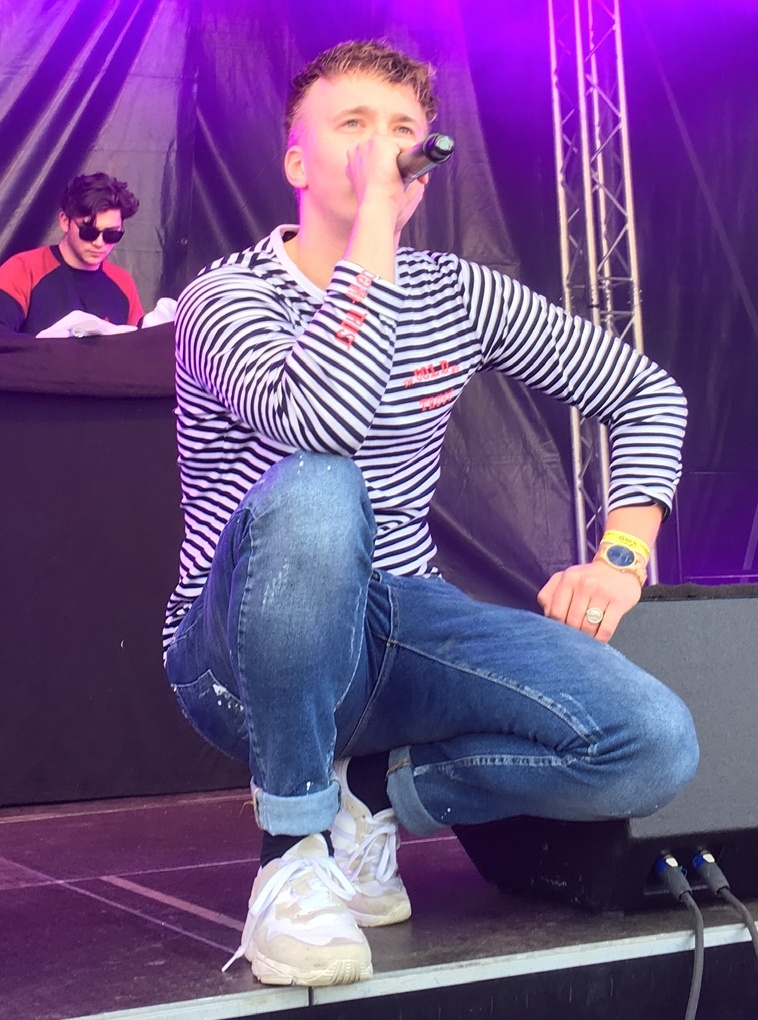
- Snelle in 2019

Background information
- Born: Lars Sebastiaan Bos; October 3, 1995 (age 31); Deventer, Netherlands
- Origin: Gorssel, Netherlands
- Genres: Nederhop, rap
- Occupation: Rapper
- Instrument: Vocals
- Years active: 2007–present
- Label: Roq 'n Rolla

Lars Sebastiaan Bos (born 3 October 1995), known professionally as Snelle, is a Dutch rapper and singer from Gorssel, Gelderland.

He is known for his Dutch number-one singles "Reünie", "Smoorverliefd", "17 miljoen mensen" and "Blijven slapen", which topped the charts between 2019 and 2021.

== Early life ==
Bos was born in Deventer. He grew up in Gorssel. Born with a cleft lip, he was bullied for his appearance.

Bos studied at the Herman Brood Academie. He adopted the stage name "Snelle" (meaning "fast" in Dutch), because he gets drunk quickly when consuming alcohol.

== Career ==
In 2019, Snelle saw a breakthrough. His singles "Scars" and "Plankgas" were certified Platinum. In September, "Reünie" reached number one on the Dutch Top 40. The song and its music video were about the bullying that Snelle faced in his childhood over his cleft lip, emphasising that he will come out stronger.

In January 2020, Snelle scored his second number-one hit with "Smoorverliefd". The song was developed in collaboration with Dutch insurance company Interpolis to warn youth about the dangers of texting while biking. His third came shortly after in March 2020 with "17 miljoen mensen", a new version of the Fluitsma & Van Tijn song "15 miljoen mensen". It was recorded with Davina Michelle live in an empty Rotterdam Ahoy during the beginning of the COVID-19 pandemic in the Netherlands. At one minute and 47 seconds long, it became the shortest number-one hit in Dutch history.

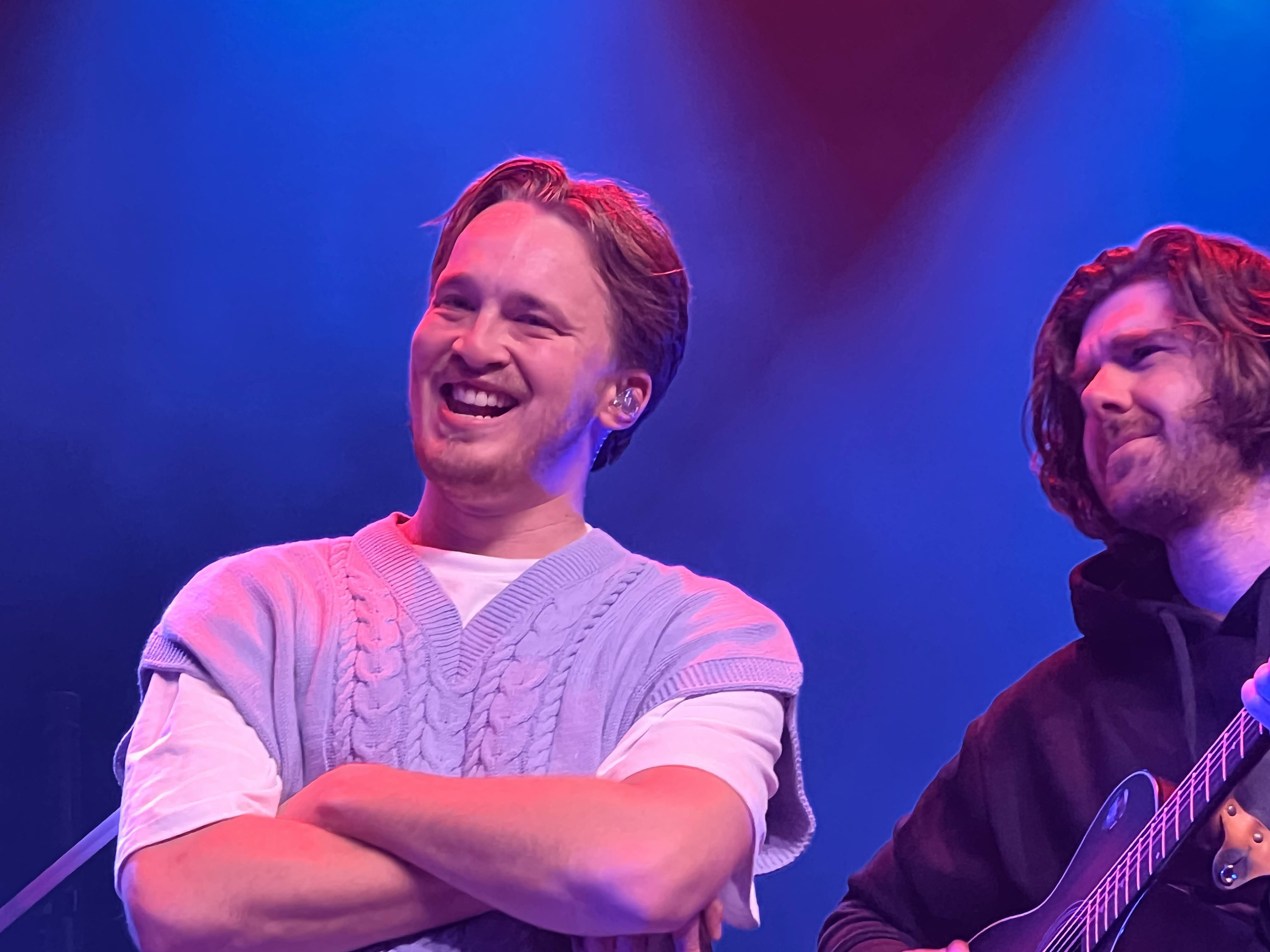
Snelle (left) in December 2022

In July 2020, Snelle was added as a judge to The Voice Kids. In August, he collaborated with fellow Gelderland duo Suzan & Freek on the single "De overkant", a tribute to the province and the Achterhoek region.

In 2021, Snelle had his biggest hit yet with "Blijven slapen", a collaboration with Maan that stayed at number one for ten weeks. A documentary about his life, Snelle: Zonder jas naar buiten, premiered on Netflix in April.

In 2022, he debuted as a presenter on the show I Want Your Song. He also served as a judge on the music competition series Ministars and on the competition series De Bondgenoot.

On 26 March 2026, Snelle released the song "Laat Het Licht Aan" along with a music video directed by Tim&Bas. The inspiration for the song came after he watched the documentary Kind Van Dementie, which was made by one of his stepsisters and her experience with her father's dementia. On 10 May, he released the song "Parkje Biertje Vrienden" together with Marc Floor and a music video was also released on 13 May 2026.

== Discography ==
=== Studio albums ===
Title	Details	NLD	Certification
Vierentwintig	Released: 25 October 2019; Format: CD, Digital download	1	NVPI: Diamond
Lars	Released: 12 March 2021; Format: CD, Digital download	1	NVPI: Diamond
1/3	Released: 25 March 2022; Format: CD, Digital download	20	
Achtentwintig	Released: 17 November 2023; Format: CD, Digital download	4	NVPI: Gold
Binnenspiegel	Released: 29 May 2026; Format: CD, Digital download	4	

=== Extended plays ===
Title	Details	NLD	Certification
Lieve Jongens	Released: 23 March 2018; Format: CD, Digital download	34	
Beetje Bij Beetje	Released: 11 January 2019; Format: CD, Digital download	2	NVPI: Gold

=== Singles ===
List of singles, with selected Top 100 chart positions
Title	Year	Peak chart positions			Certification	Album
Title	Year	NL 40	NLD	BEL (FL)	Certification	Album
"Scars"	2019	22	4	—	NVPI: 2 x Platinum BEA: Gold	Beetje Bij Beetje
"Eredivisie"	2019	—	24	—	NVPI: Platinum	Beetje Bij Beetje
"Samen"	2019	—	68	—	NVPI: Gold	Non-album single
"Plankgas" with Frenna	2019	18	6	—	NVPI: 2 x Platinum	Vierentwintig
"Non verbaal" with F1rstman	2019	—	75	—		Non-album single
"Reünie"	2019	1	1	6	NVPI: Diamond BEA: 2 x Platinum	Vierentwintig
"Lippenstift" with Marco Borsato & John Ewbank	2019	2	2	15	NVPI: Gold BEA: Platinum	Vierentwintig
"Ze Kent Mij" with Yade Lauren	2019	19	5	—	NVPI: Platinum	Vierentwintig
"Omhoog" with Esko	2019	—	20	—		Non-album single
"Smoorverliefd"	2020	1	1	2	NVPI: 2 x Platinum BEA: Platinum	Lars
"Venus" with Ronnie Flex & Frenna	2020	—	9	—	NVPI: Gold	Non-album single
"17 Miljoen Mensen" with Davina Michelle	2020	1	1	—	NVPI: Platinum	Non-album single
"Kleur"	2020	7	4	32	NVPI: Platinum	Lars
"De Overkant" with Suzan & Freek	2020	2	6	11	NVPI: Diamond	Lars
"In de schuur" with Ronnie Flex	2020	12	10	—	NVPI: 2 x Platinum	Lars
"Papa Heeft Weer Wat Gelezen" with Thomas Acda	2020	39	53	—		Lars
"Thuis"	2020	—	—	—		Lars
"Blijven Slapen" with Maan	2021	1	1	10	NVPI: Diamond	Lars
"In m'n bloed"	2021	14	22	—	NVPI: Platinum	Non-album single
"Niks Mee Te Maken" / "Pizza met Ananas"	2022	—	46	47		Non-album single
"Kijk Ons Nou" with Metejoor	2022	—	65	3	NVPI: Gold	Non-album single
"5 Voor 12"	2022	23	58	—		Non-album single
"Terugweg"	2023	27	34	48		Achtentwintig
"Alles Al" with Jonna Fraser	2023	—	51	—		Achtentwintig
"Ruggengraat" with Kraantje Pappie	2023	32	29	—	NVPI: Gold	Achtentwintig
"Radio"	2023	39	41	29		Achtentwintig
"Hoodiedate"	2023	38	57	—		Achtentwintig
"Kerst Zonder Jou" with Emma Heesters	2024	—	86	—		Non-album single
"Op Jou Heb Ik Gewacht" with De Poema's	2025	33	—	—		Non-album single
"Ik Zing" with Zoë Livay	2025	4	6	—	NVPI: Platinum	Binnenspiegel
"'k Heb je Lief"	2025	—	65	—		Non-album single
"2002" with Katja Schuurman	2026	—	—	—		Binnenspiegel
"Laat Het Licht Aan"	2026	18	44	—		Binnenspiegel
"Weer Een Dagje Ouder" with Trobi & Flemming	2026	—	99	—		Binnenspiegel
"—" denotes releases that did not chart or were not released in that territory.

== Personal life ==
After becoming famous, Snelle moved to Amsterdam, but he was often harassed by fans at his home. Thus, he moved back to his birthplace of Deventer by early January 2021.

In December 2024, he proposed to his girlfriend Sterre Kunzler in New York City's Central Park.
