= Chantal Janzen =

Dutch actress, singer and presenter

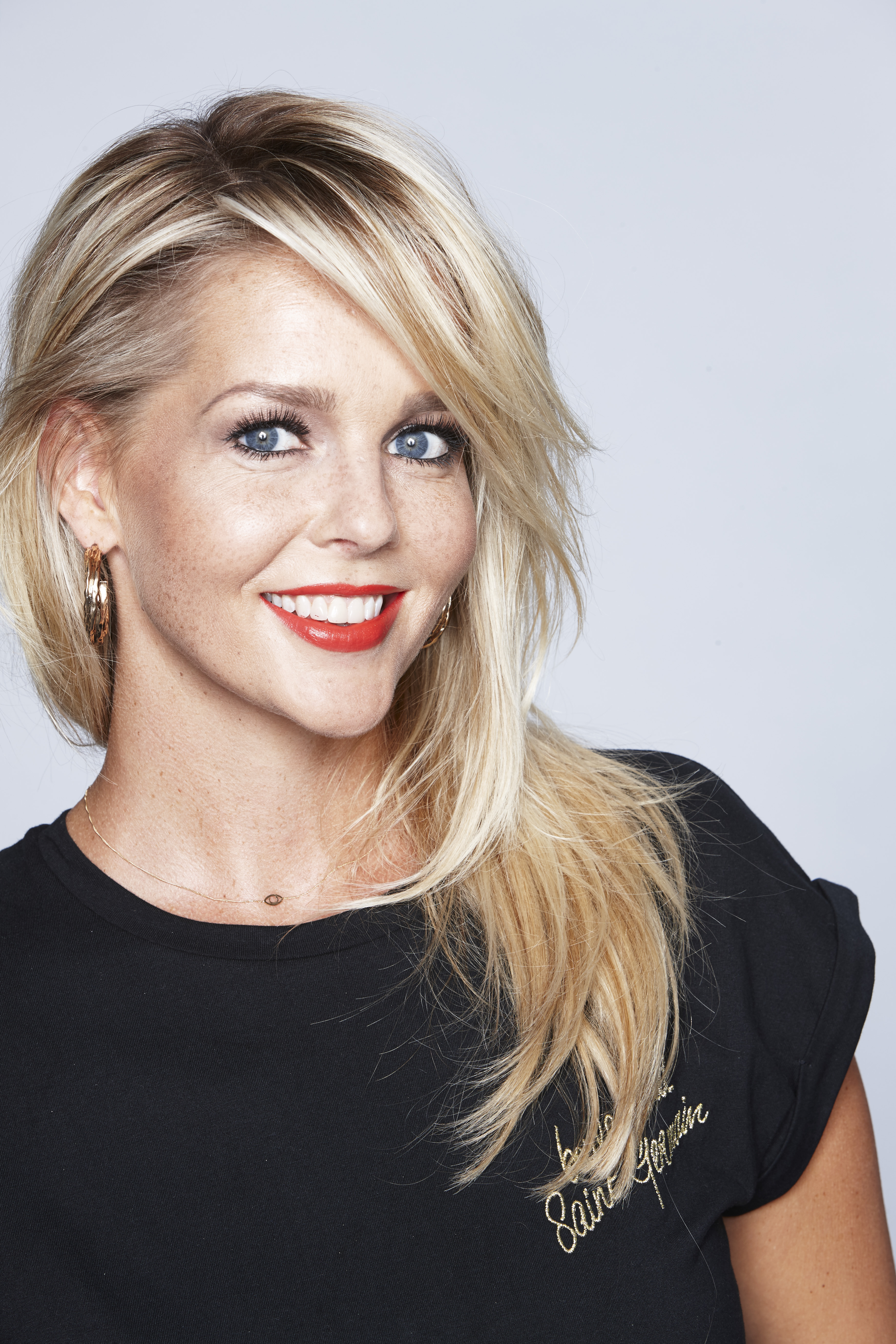
- Born: 15 February 1979 (age 47); Tegelen, Netherlands
- Occupations: Actress, singer, presenter
- Years active: 2002–present
- Known for: Eurovision: Europe Shine a Light; Eurovision Song Contest 2021

Chantal Janzen (pronounced [ɕɑnˌtɑl ˈjɑnzə(n)]; born 15 February 1979) is a Dutch actress, singer and TV presenter. She had parts in The Preacher, Full Moon Party and Deuce Bigalow: European Gigolo and presented Idols.

She also played Belle in the Dutch musical production of Beauty and the Beast (noted for being the first Belle with blonde hair) and Jane in Tarzan. From late 2011 to mid 2012, she starred as Glinda in the musical Wicked. She also sang a song against cancer, called "Vecht Mee" (English: Fight With Us) with Dutch rapper Yes-R. Internationally, she's best known for co-hosting Eurovision: Europe Shine a Light and the Eurovision Song Contest 2021.

== Life and career ==
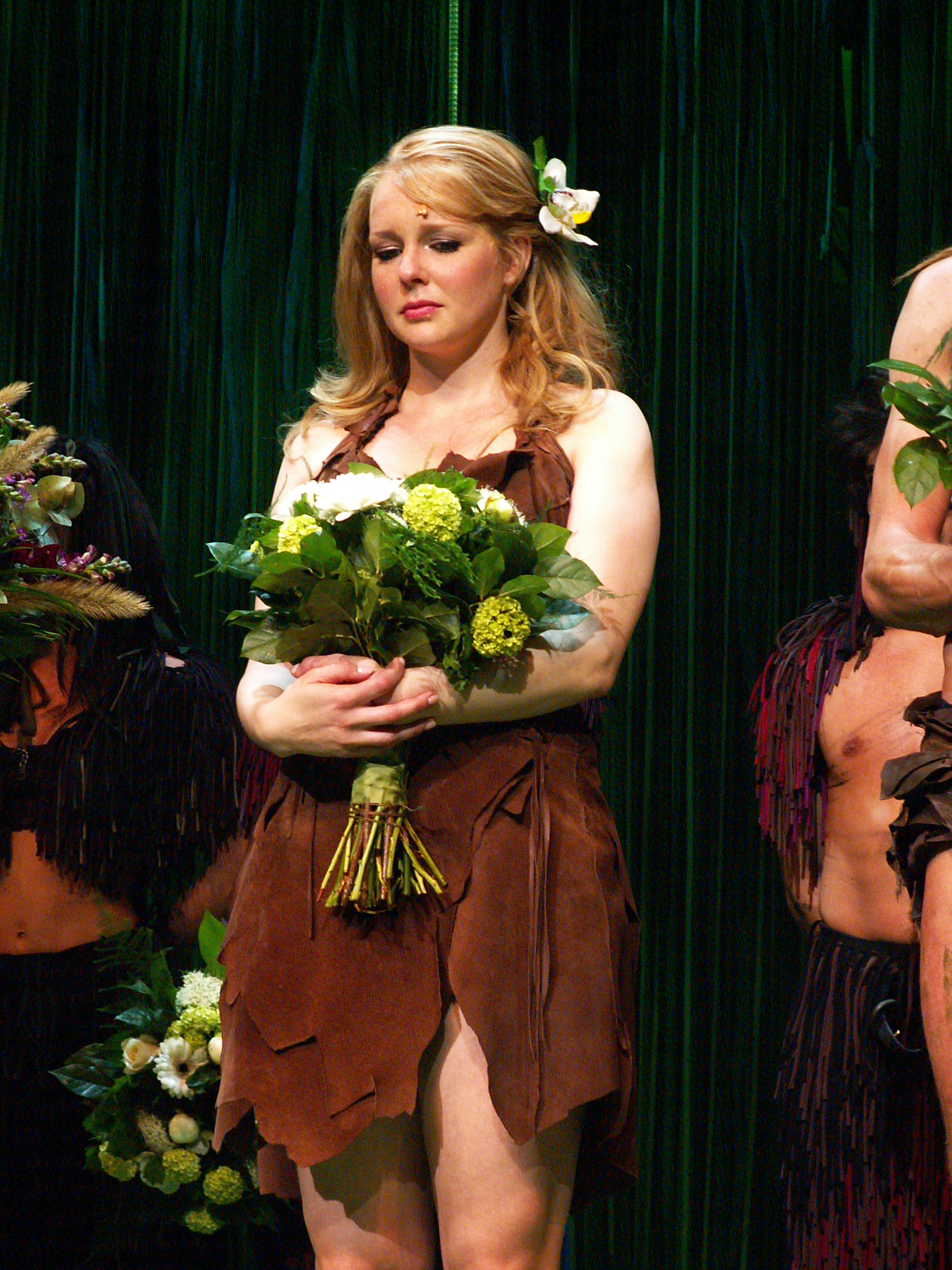
Janzen performing as Jane in the stage musical Tarzan (2009)

Janzen was born in Tegelen. She studied at the Amsterdamse Hogeschool voor de Kunsten, and was taught in classical, modern, jazz and tapdance, acting, singing and musical repertoire. She played in several musicals, including Crazy For You, Kunt u mij de weg naar Hamelen vertellen, mijnheer?, Saturday Night Fever, 42nd Street, Beauty and the Beast, Tarzan and the production of Petticoat.

She played several guest roles in TV shows like Baantjer, Intensive Care, De Band, Meiden van De Wit and Kinderen Geen Bezwaar. She also hosted Staatsloterij Live and the Dutch version of Idols. Janzen played several parts in movies: De Dominee, Feestje, Deuce Bigalow: European Gigolo, Volle Maan, Alles is Liefde, Kicks and the made-for-TV film Loverboy. In December 2002 her single "Achter De Sterren", the title song from the movie Science Fiction was released.

Janzen won the John Kraaijkamp Musical Award in 2002 for Upcoming Talent for her lead in Saturday Night Fever. She also won a musical award in 2005 for Best actress in a supporting role for the musical Crazy For You. She got nominated for Best female lead in 2006 as Belle in Beauty and the Beast and in 2007 she got nominated for the same prize for her role as Jane in the musical Tarzan. Because of her pregnancy she had to temporarily leave her part in the musical Tarzan from September 2008 through April 2009. She was replaced by Bente van den Brand. After Tarzan she played a part in the Disney Musical Sing-Along. In 2010 Janzen can be seen in the musical Petticoat. It's an original Dutch musical, written especially for her. After her role in Petticoat she played the role of Glinda in the Dutch rendition of the Broadway musical Wicked.

In 2011, Janzen ended her contract with the Dutch TV channel AVRO and signed a contract with RTL. According to her, hosting the award shows she had been hosting at the AVRO for the fourth year in a row, would make her performance look cheap. She was enthused by the idea of experiencing other things. In 2012, Janzen had roles in the series Divorce and Goede tijden, slechte tijden. In 2013, Janzen along with co-host Gordon Heuckeroth both received widespread criticism for a viral video in which they are seen repeatedly making racist jokes about a Chinese Holland's Got Talent contestant. In 2019, Janzen returned in another small role in Goede tijden, slechte tijden.

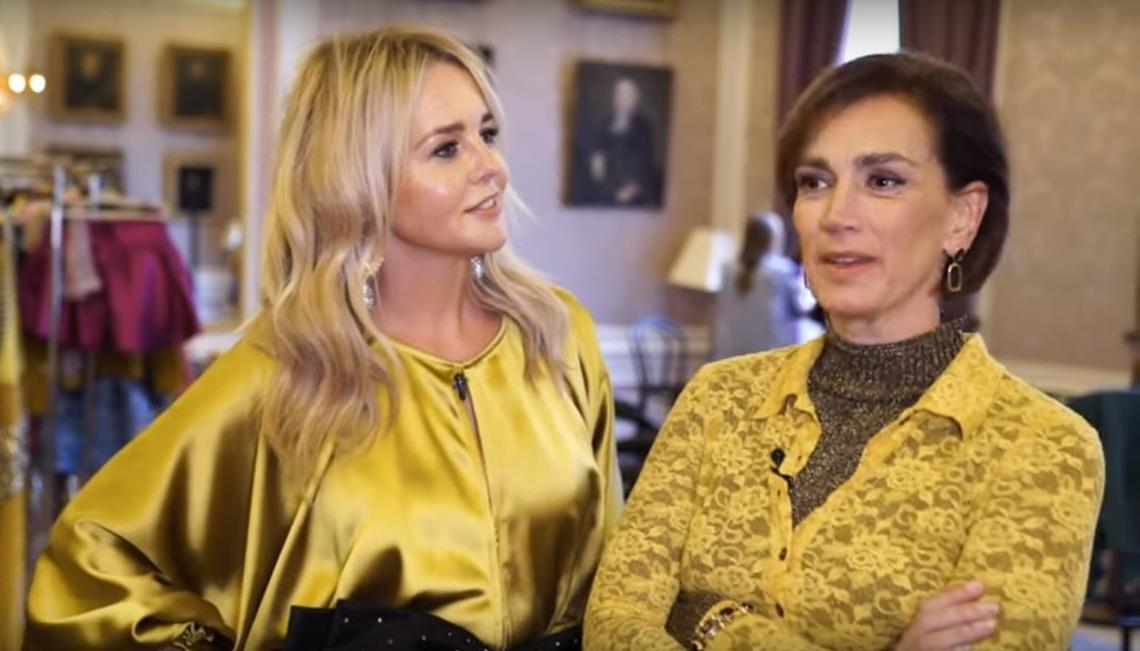
Janzen with actress Monic Hendrickx in November 2019

Since she made the switch to RTL Nederland, she has presented various television programs including De Jongens tegen de Meisjes, Everybody Dance Now, It Takes 2, Time To Dance and The Voice of Holland. She also presents the Dutch versions of Dance Dance Dance, All Together Now and Dancing with the Stars. Over the years, Janzen was also seen as a jury member in the television shows Your Face Sounds Familliar, Holland's Got Talent and The Talent Project. In 2015 and 2016, Janzen could also be seen as a presenter in Germany at The Voice Kids and as jury member at Superkids.

In 2019, Janzen was one of the members of the "Wall of the World" in the American television show The World's Best. On 4 December 2019, she was announced as one of the three presenters of the Eurovision Song Contest 2020 in Rotterdam alongside Edsilia Rombley and Jan Smit; the contest itself would be cancelled in March 2020 as a result of the COVID-19 pandemic and was replaced with Eurovision: Europe Shine a Light (which was presented jointly by Janzen, Rombley, and Smit), which was held on 16 May 2020. She went on to host the Eurovision Song Contest 2021. In November 2020, Janzen was announced as the host of the game show Beat the Champions.

== Filmography ==
=== Film ===
Year	Title	Role
2002	Volle maan	Andrea
2003	Loverboy	Claudia
2003	Pista!	Heidi
2004	Fighting Fish	Jennifer
2004	Feestje!	Talita
2004	De Dominee	Annet
2005	Deuce Bigalow: European Gigolo	Scandinavian pornstar
2007	Kicks	Denise
2007	Shrek the Third	Snow White (Dutch version)
2007	Alles is Liefde	Sarah
2007	Enchanted	Provided the voice of Princess Giselle (Amy Adams) in the Dutch version
2009	De Hel van '63	Dieuwke Ferwerda
2010	Nanny McPhee and the Big Bang	Provided the voice of Isabel Green (Maggie Gyllenhaal) in the Dutch version
2010	Het geheim	Laura Stikker
2013	Soof	Bob
2014	Gift from the Heart	Julia
2017	Het verlangen	Brigitte Hooijmakers
2024	Wicked	Provided the voice of a Wiz-O-Mania Superstar (Kristin Chenoweth) in the Dutch version

=== Television ===
As an actress

Year	Title	Role
2002	IC	Esther Goud
2003	Baantjer	Julia Hendrikx
2003	De Band	Inge
2005	Meiden van De Wit	Wendy
2005	De Lama's	Herself
2005	Samen	Iris Bestevaer
2006	Kinderen geen bezwaar	Herself
2007	Katja vs De Rest	Herself
2010–2019	De TV Kantine	various roles including Helga Geerhart, Barbie, Melania Trump, Mariska Bauer
2012	Goede tijden, slechte tijden	Glinda
2012–2016	Divorce	Sophie Schaeffer-Bax
2019	Kees & Co	Coosje
2019	Goede tijden, slechte tijden	Annelies de Heer
2023 – present	Eén grote familie	Julia Smeets

As a presenter / jury member

Year	Title	Note
2003	D'r op of d'r onder	jury member
2005–2006	Idols 3	presenter together with Martijn Krabbé
2005–2006	Staatsloterij Live	presenter together with Carlo Boszhard
2006	Staatsloterij €100,000 Show	presenter together with Carlo Boszhard
2006–2007	Ranking the Stars	panel member
2008	Chantal@AVRO.nl	presenter
2008–2010	Uitmarkt Musical Sing-Along	presenter together with Frits Sissing
2008–2009	Het Pink Ribbon Gala	presenter
2008	Joseph Backstage	presenter together with Renate Schutte
2008–2010	Gouden Televizier-Ring Gala	presenter
2008	Chalet Chantal	presenter
2009	Zóóó 30	presenter together with Ruben Nicolai
2008–2009	Het hofvijverconcert	presenter
2009	Wie is mijn ex?	presenter
2009	RTL Boulevard	presenter
2009	Uitreiking Gouden Loekie	presenter
2009	Mies 80!	presenter
2009–2010	Weten zij veel!?	presenter
2010	Op zoek naar Freek… met Chantal	presenter
2010	Backstage bij Petticoat	documentary
2011–2017	De Jongens tegen de Meisjes	presenter together with Tijl Beckand
2011	Zie Ze Vliegen	presenter together with Carlo Boszhard, Irene Moors en Gordon
2011	Sunday Night Fever	presenter
2012	Beat the Best	presenter together with Gordon
2012	Your Face Sounds Familliar	jury member
2013–2015	Everybody Dance Now	presenter
2013–present	Holland's Got Talent	jury member
2014	Het beste van Holland's Got Talent	presenter
2014	Beatrix, Met Hart en Ziel	presenter
2014	Billy Elliot: Van Auditie Tot Applaus	presenter
2014–2017	Chantal blijft slapen	presenter
2014–2016	The Voice Kids	presenter together with Thore Schölermann
2015	Carlo's TV Café	presenter together with Carlo Boszhard
2015–2018	Dance Dance Dance (Dutch version)	presenter together with Jandino Asporaat (season 1–3), and with Humberto Tan (season 4)
2015	Superkids	jury member
2015–2016	Het Collectief Geheugen	presenter
2016	It Takes 2	presenter together with Gordon
2017	Janzen & Van Dijk	presenter together with Wendy van Dijk
2017	&Chantal	presenter
2017–2020	Chantal komt werken	presenter
2018	Doe het lekker zelf	presenter
2018	Time To Dance	presenter together with Jamai
2018	The Talent Project	jury member
2019	The World's Best	jury member
2019–2020	All Together Now (Dutch version)	presenter together with Jamai Loman
2019	Chantals Pyjama Party	presenter
2019	Dancing with the Stars (Dutch version)	presenter together with Tijl Beckand
2019–present	The Voice of Holland	presenter together with Martijn Krabbé (from 2026 with Edson da Graça)
2020	De Chantal & Beau show: tussen de schuifdeuren	presenter together with Beau van Erven Dorens
2020	Eurovision: Europe Shine a Light	presenter together with Edsilia Rombley and Jan Smit
2020–present	Oh, wat een jaar!	presenter
2021–2024	Beat the Champions	presenter
2021	Eurovision Song Contest 2021	presenter together with Edsilia Rombley, Jan Smit and Nikkie de Jager
2022	Blow Up	presenter together with Martijn Krabbé
2024	De Piano	presenter
2026	Kopen Zonder Kijken	presenter

== Musicals ==
Musical
Year	Musical	Role	Notes
2000–2001	42nd Street	Lorraine Fleming / Understudy Peggy Sawyer	
2001–2003	Saturday Night Fever	Stephanie Mangano	John Kraaijkamp Musical Award 2002 for new talent
2003–2004	Kunt u mij de weg naar Hamelen vertellen, mijnheer?	Lidwientje Walg	
2004–2005	Crazy For You	Patsy / 1st understudy Polly Baker	Musical Award for best supporting actress
2005–2007	Beauty and the Beast	Belle	
2007–2009	Tarzan	Jane	
2010–2011	Petticoat!	Patricia "Pattie" Jagersma	
2011–2012	Wicked	Glinda	
2012–2015	Hij Gelooft in Mij	Rachel Hazes	
2026-2027	Cabaret	Sally Bowles	

== Personal life ==
Janzen is in a relationship with Marco Geeratz. She gave birth to their first son, James, on 23 January 2009. On 15 December 2014, they were married in London. Geeratz has three children from a prior relationship. On 30 March 2018, the couple had their second son, Bobby.

Awards and achievements
Preceded by (Israel) Erez Tal, Bar Refaeli, Assi Azar and Lucy Ayoub (2019)	Eurovision Song Contest presenter 2021; With: Edsilia Rombley, Jan Smit and Nikkie de Jager	Succeeded by (Italy) Alessandro Cattelan, Laura Pausini and (United Kingdom) Mika
