= De Verraders =

Dutch television show

- Genre: Reality television
- Created by: Marc Pos; Jasper Hoogendoorn
- Presented by: Tijl Beckand; Art Rooijakkers (Videoland, season 1); Frank Evenblij (Videoland, season 2–4)
- Composer: Eric van Tijn
- Country of origin: Netherlands
- Original language: Dutch
- No. of seasons: 6 (RTL 4); 4 (Videoland)

Production
- Production locations: Kerkrade, Netherlands (season 1–2); Lurcy-Lévis, France (season 3–5); Rochefort, Belgium (season 6); De Schiphorst, Netherlands (Videoland seasons)
- Production companies: IDTV; RTL Nederland

Original release
- Network: RTL 4
- Release: 13 March 2021 – present
- Network: Videoland
- Release: 5 December 2021 – 2 November 2024

De Verraders (Dutch for 'The Traitors') is a Dutch reality television broadcast by RTL 4 which premiered in 2021. The format of the show, presented by Tijl Beckand, is similar to the party game Mafia. The first and second seasons took place at and around Erenstein Castle in Kerkrade, the Netherlands, while the third, fourth, and fifth seasons were filmed in France. The sixth season was filmed in Belgium.

The show premiered on 13 March 2021 on RTL 4, currently has 6 seasons and is hosted by Tijl Beckand. Between 5 December 2021 and 2 November 2024, four Halloween-themed seasons aired exclusively on Videoland, hosted by Art Rooijakkers (season 1) and Frank Evenblij (season 2–4).

== Format ==
In the show, three of 18 contestants take on the role of Verrader (Traitor/Betrayer), and all other contestants take on the role of Getrouwe (Faithful). From the second season onward, the amount of traitors is not known to the faithful. The faithful do not know who the traitors are, but viewers of the show are made aware in the first episode. Each night, the traitors gather in secret to decide whom they wish to eliminate from the game; this contestant is said to have been murdered and does not show up at the next morning's breakfast. In each episode, the contestants take part in a mission to earn silver bars, which can be won in the end. In some missions, contestants can also win a shield, which protects them from elimination by the traitors that night. After completing a challenge, the contestants return to the castle to take part in the Raad (Council) – a voting round in which all contestants cast a vote on who should be eliminated from the game. In this round, the faithful hope to eliminate a traitor from the game. The eliminated persons reveal, before leaving, whether they were either a traitor or a faithful contestant.

In the first season of the show, the contestants played a game to decide the winner of the silver bars in the last episode. The two finalists independently wrote down either Verraad (Betrayal) or Trouw (Faithful). If both chose Trouw, then they split the prize, but if one person chose Verraad then that person won all the silver bars. If both chose Verraad then the runner-up won all the silver bars. In the second season of the show, the team with the most players remaining played this game to decide the winner(s) of the silver bars. In the third season, the game was not played, and instead the traitors would win if at least one traitor were remaining in the end.

Diederik Jekel, Kees Boot, and Holly Mae Brood played the role of traitor in the first season of the show, with Samantha Steenwijk being offered the role of a traitor later on in the season. In the first season, contestants managed to accumulate 22 silver bars over the course of the show. In the final, Chatilla van Grinsven and Steenwijk ended up splitting the silver bars. After the show, they decided to share their winnings with the runner-up Loiza Lamers. Stefano Keizers, Ortál Vriend and Jamie Westland played the role of traitor in the second season of the show. In the third season, five people ended up playing the role of traitor; the three traitors selected at the beginning, Maria Fiselier, Katinka Simonse, and Sander Huisman, as well as Jan Slagter and Jordy Huisman. The faithful were the winners in both the second and third seasons of the show.

Contestants need to complete a psychological test before participating, and the show also offers psychological help afterwards.

The show is produced by IDTV and PosVideo in collaboration with RTL Nederland.

== Seasons ==
=== Overview ===
Network	Season	Episodes	Timeslot	First aired	Last aired	Winner(s)	Host
RTL 4	1	8	Saturday, 20:30-22:00	13 March 2021	1 May 2021	Chatilla van Grinsven	Tijl Beckand
RTL 4	1	8	Saturday, 20:30-22:00	13 March 2021	1 May 2021	Samantha Steenwijk	Tijl Beckand
RTL 4	2	9	Friday, 20:30-22:00	1 April 2022	27 May 2022	Dionne Slagter	Tijl Beckand
RTL 4	2	9	Friday, 20:30-22:00	1 April 2022	27 May 2022	Steven Brunswijk	Tijl Beckand
RTL 4	2	9	Friday, 20:30-22:00	1 April 2022	27 May 2022	Toine van Peperstraten	Tijl Beckand
RTL 4	3	10	Friday, 20:30-22:00	3 March 2023	5 May 2023	Billy Dans	Tijl Beckand
RTL 4	3	10	Friday, 20:30-22:00	3 March 2023	5 May 2023	Chahid Charrak	Tijl Beckand
RTL 4	3	10	Friday, 20:30-22:00	3 March 2023	5 May 2023	Noor Omrani	Tijl Beckand
RTL 4	4	12	Friday, 20:30-22:00	16 February 2024	3 May 2024	Tristan	Tijl Beckand
RTL 4	5	9	Friday, 20:30-22:00	9 May 2025	4 July 2025	Chris Bauer	Tijl Beckand
RTL 4	5	9	Friday, 20:30-22:00	9 May 2025	4 July 2025	Julia Heetman	Tijl Beckand
RTL 4	6	12	Tue-Thu, 20:30-22:00	10 March 2026	2 April 2026	Géza Weisz	Tijl Beckand
RTL 4	6	12	Tue-Thu, 20:30-22:00	10 March 2026	2 April 2026	Robert van Hemert	Tijl Beckand
Videoland	1	6		5 December 2021	9 January 2022	Britt Scholte	Art Rooijakkers
Videoland	1	6		5 December 2021	9 January 2022	Iliass Ojja	Art Rooijakkers
Videoland	2	6		27 October 2022	31 October 2022	Bastiaan Ragas	Frank Evenblij
Videoland	2	6		27 October 2022	31 October 2022	Bobbi Eden	Frank Evenblij
Videoland	2	6		27 October 2022	31 October 2022	Famke Louise	Frank Evenblij
Videoland	3	6		30 September 2023	28 October 2023	Bente Fokkens	Frank Evenblij
Videoland	4 (Note: This season aired on Videoland as well as RTL 4, but was still marketed as a Videoland Original due to its Halloween subtitle, just as the previous Videoland seasons.)	6		28 September 2024	2 November 2024	Niels Oosthoek	Frank Evenblij

=== Season 1 (2021) ===
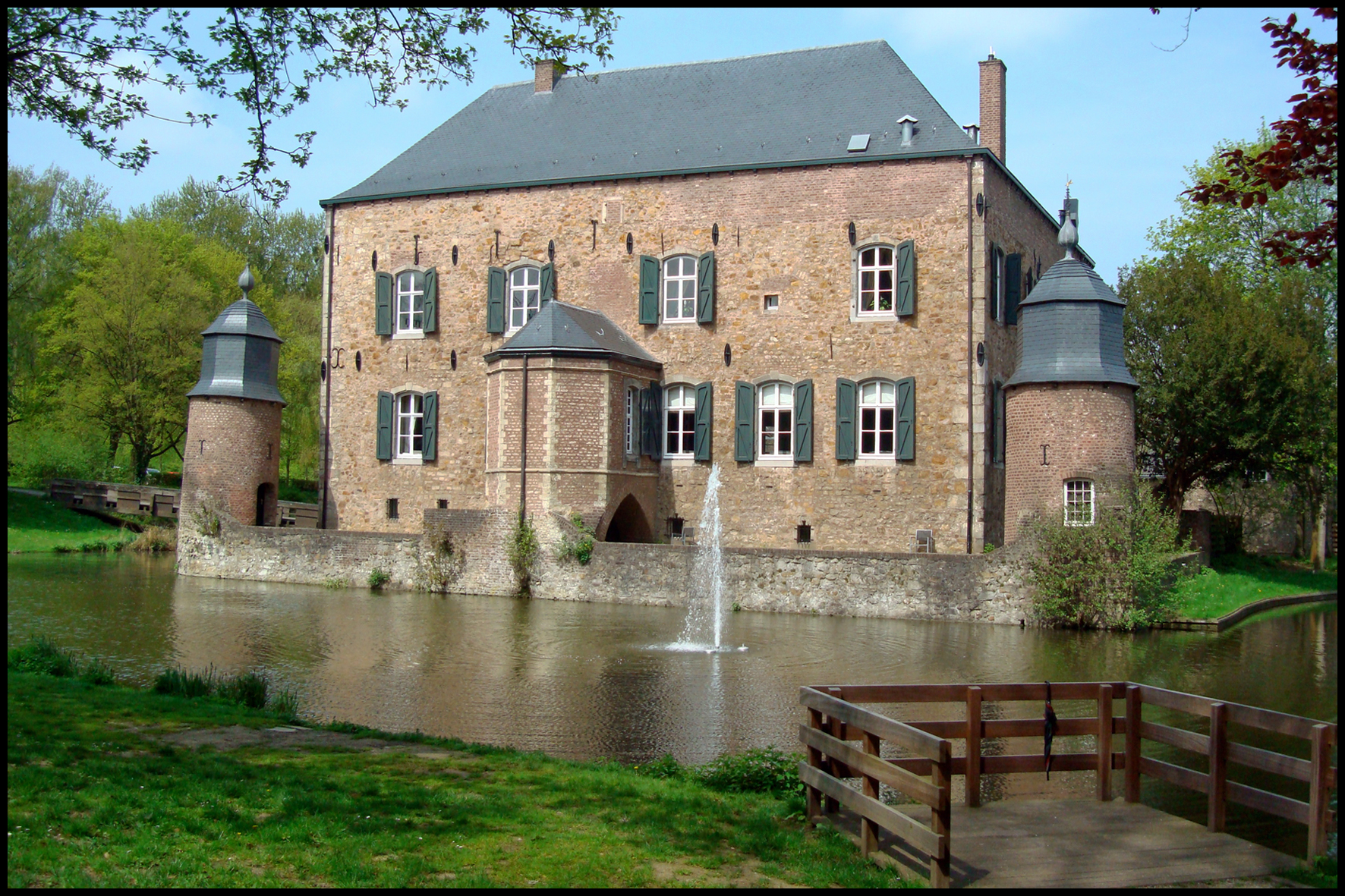
In season one and two, the show takes place at and around Castle Erenstein in Kerkrade, the Netherlands.

The first season aired from 13 March until 1 May 2021.

Name	Occupation	Outcome	Last seen in	Role
Chatilla van Grinsven	Basketball player	Winners		Faithful
Samantha Steenwijk	Singer	Winners		Traitor (Note: After Diederik's elimination in episode 4, the traitors were given the opportunity to ask a faithful contestant to become a traitor. Samantha accepted this offer and she became a traitor in episode 5. No contestant was killed by the traitors this night.) Faithful (ep 1–4)
Loiza Lamers	Model, Businesswoman	Runner-up		Faithful
Francis van Broekhuizen	Opera singer	Banished by group	Episode 8	Faithful
Loek Peters	Actor	Killed by traitor	Episode 8	Faithful
Holly Mae Brood	Actress	Banished by group	Episode 7	Traitor
Barbara Sloesen	Actress	Killed by traitors	Episode 7	Faithful
Kees Boot	Actor	Banished by group	Episode 6	Traitor
Abbey Hoes	Actress	Killed by traitors	Episode 6	Faithful
Steven Kazàn	Magician	Banished by group	Episode 5	Faithful
Diederik Jekel	Science journalist	Banished by group	Episode 4	Traitor
Kim Lammers	Hockey player	Killed by traitors	Episode 4	Faithful
Sinan Can	Journalist	Banished by group	Episode 3	Faithful
Jörgen Raymann	Comedian and presenter	Killed by traitors	Episode 3	Faithful
Edson da Graça	Presenter	Banished by group	Episode 2	Faithful
Gertjan Verbeek	Footballer and manager	Killed by traitors	Episode 2	Faithful
Daan Nieber	Presenter	Banished by group	Episode 1	Faithful
Gaby Blaaser	Actress	Killed by traitors	Episode 1	Faithful

=== Season 2 (2022) ===
The second season aired from 1 April until 27 May 2022.

Name	Occupation	Outcome	Last seen in	Role
Steven Brunswijk	Comedian	Winners		Faithful
Toine van Peperstraten	Journalist	Winners		Faithful
Dionne Slagter	YouTuber	Winners		Faithful
Stefano Keizers	Comedian	Eliminated by group	Episode 9	Traitor
Frank Evenblij	Presenter	Killed by traitor	Episode 9	Faithful
Jamie Westland	Drummer	Eliminated by group	Episode 8	Traitor
Babette van Veen	Actress	Killed by traitors	Episode 8	Faithful
Ortál Vriend	Actress	Eliminated by group (Note: In episode 6, Stefano received a shield as a traitor, and suggested to the other traitors to kill himself, thereby no one was killed that night.)	Episode 7	Traitor
Frank van der Lende	Radio DJ	Eliminated by group	Episode 6	Faithful
Sylvia Geersen	Model	Killed by traitors	Episode 6	Faithful
Irene Moors	Television personality	Eliminated by group	Episode 5	Faithful
Esmée van Kampen	Actress	Killed by traitors	Episode 5	Faithful
Robbie Kammeijer	News reporter	Eliminated by group	Episode 4	Faithful
Carolina Dijkhuizen	Singer	Killed by traitors	Episode 4	Faithful
Aran Bade	Reporter	Eliminated by group	Episode 3	Faithful
Joep Sertons	Actor	Killed by traitors	Episode 3	Faithful
Stella Bergsma	Singer	Eliminated by group	Episode 2	Faithful
Giel de Winter	YouTuber	Killed by traitors	Episode 2	Faithful

=== Season 3 (2023) ===
The third season aired from 3 March until 5 May 2023.

Name	Occupation	Outcome	Last seen in	Role
Chahid Charrak	Influencer	Winners		Faithful
Billy Dans	Artist	Winners		Faithful
Noor Omrani	Hockey player	Winners		Faithful
Jordy Huisman	Musician	Banished by group	Episode 10	Traitor (Note: Jordy was asked by Sander, the last remaining traitor in the game, to become a traitor without being given the option to decline. Jordy became a traitor at the end of episode 7.) Faithful (ep 1-7)
Sander Huisman	Musician	Banished by group	Episode 10	Traitor
Nathan Rutjes	Footballer	Killed by traitors	Episode 10	Faithful
Betty Glas	News reporter	Banished by group	Episode 9	Faithful
Pernille La Lau	Presenter	Killed by traitors	Episode 9	Faithful
Jessie Maya	YouTuber	Banished by group	Episode 8	Faithful
Ferri Somogyi	Actor	Killed by traitors	Episode 8	Faithful
Jan Slagter	Director Omroep MAX	Banished by group	Episode 7	Traitor (Note: After Maria's elimination in episode 5, the traitors were given the opportunity to ask a faithful contestant to become a traitor. Jan accepted this offer and he became a traitor in episode 6. No contestant was killed by the traitors this night.) Faithful (ep 1–5)
Selma Omari	YouTuber	Killed by traitors	Episode 7	Faithful
Katinka Simonse	Artist	Banished by group	Episode 6	Traitor
Maria Fiselier	Opera singer	Banished by group	Episode 5	Traitor
Thomas Cammaert	Actor	Killed by traitors	Episode 5	Faithful
Noël van Kleef	Actress	Banished by group	Episode 4	Faithful
Herman den Blijker	Chef	Killed by traitors	Episode 4	Faithful
Giorgio Hokstam	Radio DJ	Banished by group	Episode 3	Faithful
Sunny Bergman	Documentary maker	Killed by traitors	Episode 3	Faithful
Irene van de Laar	Presenter	Banished by group	Episode 2	Faithful

=== Season 4 (2024) ===
The fourth season aired from 16 February until 3 May 2024. This was the first (and currently only) season with civilians as contestants instead of celebrities. Tristan (a gym owner, who was a faithful from the start until episode 9, and a traitor from episode 9 onwards), won the season.

=== Season 5 (2025) ===
The fifth season aired from 9 May until 4 July 2025. After eliminating the last remaining traitors, the faithful won, with singer Christiaan Bauer and influencer Julia Heetman splitting the prize pot.

=== Season 6 (2026) ===
The sixth season aired from 10 March until 2 April 2026.

Place	Contestant	Outcome	Last seen in	Role
1	Géza Weisz (actor)	Winners		Traitor
1	Robert van Hemert (singer)	Winners		Traitor (Note: After Denise's elimination in episode 4, the traitors were given the opportunity to ask a faithful contestant to become a traitor. Robert accepted this offer and he became a traitor at the start of episode 5. No contestant was killed by the traitors this night.) Faithful (ep 1–4)
2	Ellemieke Vermolen (writer)	Banished by group	Episode 12	Faithful
3	Roos Schlikker (columnist)	Banished by group	Episode 12	Faithful
4	London Loy (TV chef)	Killed by traitors	Episode 12	Faithful
5	Mariana Verkerk (model/catwalk coach)	Banished by group	Episode 11	Faithful
6	Birgit Schuurman (singer/actress)	Killed by traitors	Episode 11	Faithful
7	Sjaak (rapper)	Banished by group	Episode 10	Faithful
8	Emms (rapper)	Killed by traitors (Note: At the end of episode 8, the traitors had to make a shortlist instead of killing someone. Remaining traitors Géza and Robert put themselves, Emms and Sjaak on the list. The shortlist was revealed to the group in episode 9. The ones on the shortlist would have to make a plea to not be killed. The traitors would make a choice who to kill based on the plea, and had to reveal themselves to them. At the beginning of episode 10, it was revealed they chose to kill Emms. Hereby, no one was killed in episode 9.)	Episode 10	Faithful
9	Boyan Ephraim (newsreader)	Banished by group	Episode 9	Faithful
10	Beau Schneider (actor)	Banished by group	Episode 8	Faithful
11	Kimmylien Nguyen (TV personality)	Killed by traitors	Episode 8	Faithful
12	Roelof Hemmen (TV presenter)	Banished by group	Episode 7	Traitor
13	Juultje Tieleman (influencer)	Killed by traitors (Note: At the round table in episode 6, the group was offered a choice: banish someone, or let someone be killed by the traitors. If at least one contestant would choose to kill, that would be the outcome of the vote. Beau (afraid of being banished) chose to kill, thereby no one was banished that evening. At the start of episode 7, Juultje was revealed to be killed that night.)	Episode 7	Faithful
14	Milo ter Reegen (content creator/artist)	Killed by traitors	Episode 6	Faithful
15	Amy Vol (singer, Ogene)	Banished by group (Note: In episode 3, the outcome of the mission would determine if a contestant could be killed by the traitors the following night or not. At the beginning of episode 4, it was revealed that the mission was a success, thereby no one was killed.)	Episode 5	Faithful
16	Denise Laan (former police officer)	Banished by group	Episode 4	Traitor
17	Thomas van der Vlugt (TV presenter/actor)	Banished by group	Episode 3	Faithful
18	Daniëlle van Grondelle (model)	Left for medical reasons	Episode 3	Faithful
19	Tess Wester (former handball player)	Killed by traitors	Episode 3	Faithful
20	Henk Krol (former politician)	Banished by group	Episode 2	Faithful
21	Raisha Zeegelaar (TV presenter)	Killed by traitors	Episode 2	Faithful

=== Videoland (De Verraders Halloween) ===
Four seasons were produced to air exclusively on Videoland. They were all filmed at De Havixhorst in De Schiphorst, Meppel, Netherlands. Art Rooijakkers presented the first season. From the second season onwards, Frank Evenblij (who was a contestant in the second RTL 4 season) replaced Rooijakkers as host, and the Videoland editions were Halloween-themed.

==== Season 1 (2021–2022) ====
Art Rooijakkers presented a season of De Verraders which aired on exclusively on Videoland from 5 December 2021 until 9 January 2022.

Name	Occupation	Outcome	Last seen in	Role
Britt Scholte	Actress	Winner		Traitor
Iliass Ojja	Actor	Winner		Traitor
Romana van Baaijen	Reality TV personality	Runner-up		Faithful
Ellen Hoog	Former field hockey player	Eliminated by group	Episode 6	Faithful
Tisjeboyjay	YouTuber	Killed by traitors	Episode 6	Faithful
Henk Grol	Former judoka	Eliminated by group	Episode 5	Faithful
Shelly Sterk	Presenter	Killed by traitors	Episode 5	Faithful
Thijs Zeeman	Journalist	Eliminated by group (Note: In episode 3, Thijs received a shield as a traitor, and suggested to the other traitors to kill himself, thereby no one was killed that night.)	Episode 4	Traitor
Tim Senders	Presenter	Eliminated by group	Episode 3	Faithful
Envy Peru	Drag queen	Killed by traitors	Episode 3	Faithful
Bettina Holwerda	Actress	Eliminated by group	Episode 2	Faithful
Amara Onwuka	Meteorologist	Killed by traitors	Episode 2	Faithful

==== Season 2 (2022) ====
The second Videoland season (the first to be Halloween-themed) aired from 27 until 31 October 2022.

Name	Occupation	Outcome	Last seen in	Role
Bobbi Eden	Adult film actress	Winner		Faithful
Famke Louise	Singer	Winner		Faithful
Bastiaan Ragas	Actor	Winner		Faithful
Soundos El Ahmadi	Comedian	Eliminated by group	Episode 6	Traitor
Gwen van Poorten	Presenter	Eliminated by group	Episode 6	Faithful
Hugo Kennis	Chef	Eliminated by group	Episode 6	Traitor (Note: After Dave's elimination in episode 2, the traitors were given the opportunity to ask a faithful contestant to become a traitor. Hugo accepted this offer and he became a traitor in episode 3. No contestant was killed by the traitors this night.) Faithful (ep 1–2)
Dennis Weening	Presenter	Killed by traitors	Episode 5	Faithful
Ayoub Louihrani	Farmer	Killed by traitors	Episode 5	Faithful
Frits Wester	Journalist	Eliminated by group	Episode 4	Traitor
Heleen van Royen	Writer	Killed by traitors	Episode 4	Faithful
Airen Mylene	Presenter	Eliminated by group	Episode 3	Faithful
Dave Roelvink	DJ	Eliminated by group	Episode 2	Traitor
Christina Curry	Model	Killed by traitors	Episode 2	Faithful

==== Season 3 (2023) ====
The third Halloween season aired on Videoland from 30 September until 28 October 2023. Frank Evenblij returned to host.

Name	Occupation	Outcome	Last seen in	Role
Bente Fokkens	Singer	Winner		Traitor (Note: Bente was asked by André, the last remaining traitor in the game, to become a traitor without being given the option to decline. Bente became a traitor at the start of episode 4.) Faithful (ep 1–3)
Bokoesam	Rapper	Runner-up		Faithful
Pepijn Lanen	Rapper	Runner-up		Faithful (Note: After Guido's elimination in episode 2, the traitors were given the opportunity to ask a faithful contestant to become a traitor. They asked Pepijn, but he declined at the beginning of episode 3.)
Rob Goossens	Commentator	Eliminated by group	Episode 6	Faithful
Bertie Steur	Farmer	Eliminated by group	Episode 6	Faithful
Katja Schuurman	Actress	Killed by traitors	Episode 6	Faithful
JayJay Boske	Presenter	Eliminated by group	Episode 5	Traitor (Note: JayJay was asked by Bente, the last remaining traitor in the game, to become a traitor without being given the option to decline. JayJay became a traitor at the end of episode 4.) Faithful (ep 1–4)
Tim den Besten	Presenter	Killed by traitors	Episode 5	Faithful
André Dongelmans	Actor	Eliminated by group	Episode 4	Traitor
Monica Geuze	Influencer	Killed by traitors	Episode 4	Faithful
Eva Koreman	Radio DJ	Eliminated by group	Episode 3	Traitor
Guido Weijers	Comedian	Eliminated by group	Episode 2	Traitor
Fajah Lourens	Influencer	Killed by traitors	Episode 2	Faithful

==== Season 4 (2024) ====
The fourth Halloween season aired from 28 September until 2 November 2024. Frank Evenblij returned to host. Unlike the previous seasons which were aired exclusively on Videoland, this season was also broadcast on RTL 4.

Name	Occupation	Outcome	Last seen in	Role
Niels Oosthoek	YouTuber	Winner		Traitor
Leslie Keijzer	Writer	Runner-up		Faithful
Remy Bonjasky	Former kickboxer	Eliminated by group	Episode 6	Faithful
Maik de Boer	Stylist	Eliminated by group	Episode 6	Faithful
Leontine Ruiters	Presenter	Killed by traitor	Episode 6	Faithful
Sander Lantinga	Presenter	Eliminated by group	Episode 5	Traitor (Note: Sander was asked by Niels, the last remaining traitor in the game, to become a traitor without being given the option to decline. Sander became a traitor at the end of episode 4.) Faithful (ep 1–4)
Danny Froger	Singer	Killed by traitors	Episode 5	Faithful
Olcay Gulsen	Fashion designer	Eliminated by group	Episode 4	Traitor
Marco Schuitmaker	Singer	Killed by traitors	Episode 4	Faithful
Cherry-Ann Person	Television personality	Eliminated by group	Episode 3	Traitor
Georgina Verbaan	Actress	Killed by traitors	Episode 3	Faithful
Nesim Al Ahmadi	Comedian	Eliminated by group	Episode 2	Faithful
Nienke Plas	Comedian	Killed by traitors	Episode 2	Faithful

== See also ==
- The Traitors
