= Het Perfecte Plaatje =

Dutch photography television show

Het Perfecte Plaatje (Note: Sometimes written as Het perfecte plaatje or Het perfecte plaatje op reis for the seasons filmed abroad.) (Dutch for: The Perfect Picture) is a Dutch photography television show in which contestants compete to create the best photo in various challenges. Tijl Beckand is the presenter of the show. The first season of the show aired in 2016. Several seasons of the show have been filmed abroad and these seasons are referred to as Het Perfecte Plaatje op Reis, with each season named after the country (e.g., Het Perfecte Plaatje in Argentinië which was filmed in Argentina).

As of March 2026, Leonie ter Braak is scheduled to become the presenter of the next season of Het Perfecte Plaatje op Reis as Tijl Beckand is unable to combine the show with his other work.

== Seasons ==
=== Het Perfecte Plaatje ===
Year	Season	Winner	Contestants
2016	1	Humberto Tan	Humberto Tan, Kim Feenstra, Marco Borsato, Paulien Huizinga, Heleen van Royen, Ruud Feltkamp, Winston Gerschtanowitz
2017	2	Estelle Cruijff	Estelle Cruijff, Giel de Winter, Isa Hoes, Roel van Velzen, Tygo Gernandt, Gordon, Vivian Reijs, Monique Smit
2018	3	Patty Brard	Patty Brard, Jim Bakkum, Raven van Dorst, Herman den Blijker, Marlijn Weerdenburg, Ruben van der Meer, Lieke van Lexmond, Mari van de Ven
2019	4	Jamie Westland	Jamie Westland, Kees Tol, Daphne Deckers, Froukje de Both, Steven Brunswijk, Christina Curry, Helga van Leur, Johnny Kraaijkamp jr.
2020	5	Bibi Breijman	Bibi Breijman, Stefano Keizers, Janny van der Heijden, Bert van Leeuwen, Soy Kroon, Victoria Koblenko, Raymond van Barneveld, Art Rooijakkers, Miljuschka Witzenhausen, Patricia Paay
2021	6	Patrick Martens	Patrick Martens, Frits Sissing, Georgina Verbaan, Juvat Westendorp, Bridget Maasland, Ruth Jacott, Jaap Reesema, Abbey Hoes, John Heitinga, Donnie
2022	7	Linda Hakeboom	Linda Hakeboom, Geraldine Kemper, Tina de Bruin, Trijntje Oosterhuis, Filemon Wesselink, Maik de Boer, Najib Amhali, Edwin Jonker, Bente Fokkens, Inge Ipenburg
2023	8	Loes Haverkort	Loes Haverkort, Niek Roozen, Quinty Misiedjan, Henry Schut, Frans Duijts, Waldemar Torenstra, Anna Drijver, Sylvia Geersen, Sergio Vyent, Annemarie van Gaal
2024	9	Antoinette Hertsenberg	Antoinette Hertsenberg, Pauline Wingelaar, Fenna Ramos, Claes Iversen, Amara Onwuka, Lex Uiting, Giovanni van Bronckhorst, Toine van Peperstraten, Loiza Lamers, Floris Göbel
2025	10	Lykele Muus	Lykele Muus, Oos Kesbeke, Kirsten Westrik, Aran Bade, Bettina Holwerda, Dwight van van de Vijver, Caroline Tensen, Nabil Aoulad Ayad, Rhodé Kok, Catherine Keyl
2026	11		Katja Schuurman, Giel Beelen, Merel Ek, Michel Mulder, Tamara Elbaz, Duncan Tromp, Mischa Blok, Mark Schaaf, London Loy, Lizzy van der Ligt, Ajouad El Miloudi, Guido Spek

=== Het Perfecte Plaatje op Reis ===
Year	Season	Country	Winner	Contestants
2022	1	Argentina	Maurice Lede	Maurice Lede, Jochem van Gelder, Thomas Berge, Tim den Besten, Babette van Veen, Roxanne Kwant, Renée Soutendijk, Daphne Bunskoek
2023	2	South Africa	Leonie ter Braak	Leonie ter Braak, Rick Brandsteder, Numidia, Tatum Dagelet, Wildebras, Eloise van Oranje, Rob Dekay, Jaap Jongbloed
2024	3	Thailand	Kaj Gorgels	Kaj Gorgels, Fresia Cousiño Arias, Susan Visser, Danny de Munk, Sophie Bouquet, April Darby, Gallyon van Vessem, Mark Baanders, Leafs
2025	4	Italy	Irene Moors	Irene Moors, Stefan Jurriens, Sosha Duysker, Edson da Graça, Wim Kieft, Kim Kötter, Hila Noorzai, Ferri Somogyi
2026	5	Vietnam	Jan Kooijman	Jan Kooijman, Danny Froger, Jelka van Houten, Tobias Camman, Shary-An Nivillac, Jörgen Raymann, Quinty Trustfull, Kelly de Vries, Gwen van Poorten, Charles Groenhuijsen
