= Maria Fiselier =

- Born: 17 April 1988 (age 38); Amersfoort
- Genre: Opera
- Occupation: Singer
- Instrument: Vocals mezzo-soprano
- Formerly of: Komische Oper Berlin

Maria Fiselier (born 17 April 1988) is a Dutch mezzo-soprano.

== Biography ==
Fiselier graduated from the Royal Conservatory in The Hague in 2013 with the distinction 'Artistry and integrity in performing'. She was part of the National Opera Studio in London in the 2012/13 season. Fiselier is the third generation of her family to perform opera, but the first with an international career. She took masterclasses with Joyce DiDonato, Brindley Sherrat, and Christa Ludwig, among others.

Fiselier has participated in various opera productions, including at the Dutch National Opera, and was a soloist at the Komische Oper Berlin in Berlin, Germany through the 2021 season.

In 2017, Fiselier participated in the program Tijl B op volle toeren. She was a guest alongside André Hazes, and made her own version of the hit Leef, under the name Vivre. In 2018, she appeared in the program Beste Zangers as an opera singer. Among other things, she performed the song Lose Yourself by Eminem.

In 2022, Fiselier was the Carol Singer in the third edition of the television program Scrooge Live.

In 2023, Fiselier was a contestant in the third season of the RTL 4 program De Verraders. In it, she was one of three traitors, but was removed by the group in the fifth episode. In the same year, Fiselier participated in the SBS6 program Top 4000 Muziekquiz together with Ruben Hein. In 2024, Fiselier participated in the SBS6 program 30 Seconds. In that same year, she sang with her sisters Eva and Anne in the television program DNA Singers.

In 2025, Fiselier participated in the television program De kwis met ballen VIPS together with her family.

In February 2026, Fiselier appeared as a guest judge on the SBS6 television program The Winner Takes It All.

== Discography ==
Fiselier has recorded one CD, To Go into the Unknown (2014), in collaboration with Peter Nilsson, the Head of Music Studies at the Dutch National Opera Academy.

== Awards ==
In 2011, Fiselier won the audience award at the Grachtenfestival Conservatorium Concours. A year later, she won six prizes at the Internationaal Vocalisten Concours's-Hertogenbosch, including the Vrienden van het Lied Prize.
