= Ruben Nicolai =

Dutch television presenter and comedian (born 1975)

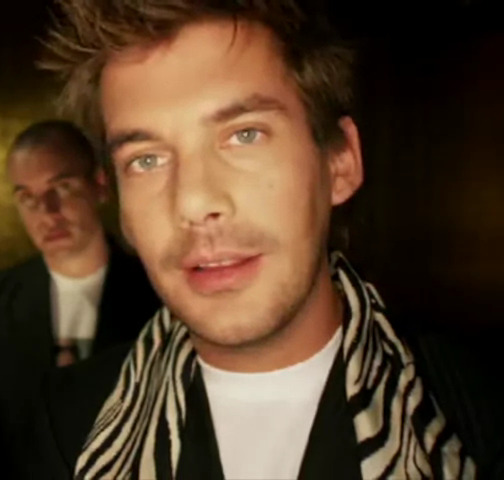
- Nicolai in 2013
- Born: Ruben Iskander Nicolai; 8 May 1975 (age 51); Lanaken, Belgium
- Occupations: Television presenter; Comedian

Ruben Nicolai (born 8 May 1975) is a Dutch television presenter and comedian. He is known as one of the comedians in the television show De Lama's together with Tijl Beckand, Ruben van der Meer and Jeroen van Koningsbrugge. He has also presented many television shows, including Lego Masters and The Masked Singer.

== Career ==
=== Early career ===
Together with Nathan Vecht he won both the audience award and the jury award at the Cameretten cabaret festival in 2002.

Between 2004 and 2008, Nicolai formed part of the core team of comedians in the television show De Lama's, together with Ruben van der Meer, Tijl Beckand and Jeroen van Koningsbrugge. The show is a Dutch adaptation of the show Whose Line Is It Anyway?. In 2006, they won the Gouden Televizier-Ring award for the show.

Nicolai presented the quiz show Rat van Fortuin for broadcasting association BNN in 2006 and 2007. In 2007, he was nominated for the Zilveren Televizier-Ster award but he did not win. From 2008 to 2012, Nicolai and Sophie Hilbrand presented the show Ruben vs. Sophie in which they compete against each other in various challenges. In 2009, he won the Zilveren Televizier-Ster award for best presenter.

He was a presenter in several seasons of the show Try Before You Die. For the show, Nicolai took part in various activities and challenges, including playing a role in a 2006 episode of the American soap opera As the World Turns. He was one of the presenters of the 2009 television show Budget TV. The show ended after ten episodes due to disappointing viewing figures. In the same year, Nicolai and Karoline Kamosi presented the fourth season of the show 71° Noord in which contestants travel through Norway.

In 2010, he presented the television show Gehaktdag in which a Dutch celebrity was satirically critiqued by two teams. In January 2011, Nicolai switched from AVRO to work for his previous employer BNN. In 2011 and 2012, he presented the television quiz show Doe Maar Normaal. He also presented the 2011 show Topmanager gezocht, a show similar to The Apprentice. Nicolai presented the show De allerslechtste chauffeur van Nederland from 2011 to 2013 in which people with not very good driving skills are tasked with completing driving challenges. Both Nicolai and a cameraman were hospitalised after they were hit by a car during the filming of a 2011 episode of the show. He presented the 2013 television show Golden Oldies in which an elderly choir sings rock songs.

Nicolai presented De allerslechtste echtgenoot van Nederland, a 2013 show in which husbands compete against each other. A few months later, he competed against Katja Schuurman in various challenges in the television show Ruben vs Katja. In 2014, he competed against Geraldine Kemper in the show Ruben vs Geraldine. Nicolai and Sophie Hilbrand presented the 2015 edition of De Nationale IQ Test.

=== RTL ===
At the end of March 2015, Nicolai left BNNVARA, the broadcasting association which formed in January 2014 as a merger of BNN and VARA. He began working for RTL in 2015.

In 2015, Nicolai presented the game show Vijf tegen Vijf, a game show based on the original American format of Family Feud. He was also a contestant in a 2015 episode of the game show De Jongens tegen de Meisjes. Nicolai is also the presenter of the game show Beste Kijkers which first aired in 2015. In the same year, he was co-host in one episode of the show Carlo's TV Café presented by Carlo Boszhard. In 2016, Nicolai presented the second season of Grillmasters, a barbeque cooking show. He presented the television show Staatsloterij: Puur Geluk in 2016.

Nicolai presented Idols 5 (2016) and Idols 6 (2017) of the Idols television series together with Lieke van Lexmond. In 2016, Nicolai and Wendy van Dijk presented the quiz show De Nationale Gezondheidstest with questions about health. They both also presented the health show RTL Gezondheidstest in 2018. Nicolai became one of the presenters of RTL Boulevard in 2016. He renewed his contract with RTL in 2018 and again in 2020.

Nicolai and Tijl Beckand also presented Professor Nicolai & Dr. Beckand, a quiz and game show with small scientific experiments and questions about science. In the show, science journalist and presenter Diederik Jekel helps to explain the scientific concepts and experiments. Since 2017, he is one of the team captains in the television show Oh, wat een jaar!, a show in which contestants revisit a particular year. In 2018, Nicolai and Olcay Gulsen presented the boxing television show Boxing Stars. In the same year, Nicolai and Tijl Beckand became team captains in the game show Wie ben ik? presented by Wendy van Dijk and later by Caroline Tensen. Contestants in two teams are assigned a name or an object and they need to guess who or what they are by asking questions. He was also team captain for Team Holland in several seasons of the show Holland-België in which Dutch contestants compete against Flemish contestants.

Since 2019, Nicolai presents the quiz show Ik weet er alles van! which serves as replacement for the soap opera Goede tijden, slechte tijden during its summer break. He also presents Ik weet er alles van! VIPS with celebrities and Ik weet er alles van! Junior with children. Since 2019, he presents the Dutch version of The Masked Singer. In 2020, Nicolai and Belgian actor and presenter Kürt Rogiers presented the television show Lego Masters in which teams from the Netherlands and Flanders compete to build the best constructions using Lego. The show returned in 2021 for its second season.

In 2022, Nicolai presented the show Volg je me nog? in which two teams answer questions about online media. The team captains were Tijl Beckand and Nynke de Jong. He presented the television show Domino Challenge in which duos compete to create and topple the best domino patterns. He also presented The Big Show met Ruben Nicolai, a television show similar to Michael McIntyre's Big Show hosted by British comedian Michael McIntyre. Since 2022, Nicolai, Tijl Beckand, Ruben van der Meer and Jeroen van Koningsbrugge perform theatre shows under the name TAFKAL (The Artists Formerly Known As Lama's).

He presented the television show Doet-ie 't of doet-ie 't niet in 2024. Gerard Joling and Ruben Nicolai presented the television show Te land, ter zee en in de lucht in which contestants compete to complete a course in a homemade vehicle. In 2025, Nicolai and Kürt Rogiers present the fourth season of Lego Masters, titled Lego Masters: Out of the Box. He also presents the television show De Erfgenaam in which he searches for people that can receive an unclaimed inheritance.

In 2026, he presented the television show Pandora, a reality game show which revolves around a box inspired by Pandora's box, an artifact in Greek mythology. In February 2026, he became one of the presenters of the ninth season of the show Kopen Zonder Kijken after Martijn Krabbé was no longer able to present the show due to his health. Krabbé did the voice-over and the show was presented by multiple presenters. In the show, people purchase a home without having seen it first and the team of Kopen Zonder Kijken makes all relevant decisions based on budget and preferences.

== Personal life ==
Nicolai studied theatre, film and television studies in Utrecht, Netherlands. He is father of two daughters. His relationship with Laurien ended in 2013 after eleven years. He was also in a relationship with Paulien from 2019 to 2025.

== Filmography ==
=== As presenter ===
- De Lama's (2004–2008)
- Rat van Fortuin (2006–2007)
- Try Before You Die (2006–2008)
- Ruben vs. Sophie (2008–2012)
- Budget TV (2009)
- 71° Noord (2009)
- Gehaktdag (2010)
- Doe Maar Normaal (2011–2012)
- De allerslechtste chauffeur van Nederland (2011–2013)
- Topmanager gezocht (2011)
- Golden Oldies (2013)
- De allerslechtste echtgenoot van Nederland (2013)
- Ruben vs Katja (2013)
- Ruben vs Geraldine (2014)
- De Nationale IQ Test (2015)
- Vijf tegen Vijf (2015)
- Beste Kijkers (2015 – present)
- Professor Nicolai & Dr. Beckand (2015–2018)
- Carlo's TV Café (2015, co-host, one episode)
- Idols 5 (2016)
- De Nationale Gezondheidstest (2016)
- RTL Boulevard (2016–2020)
- Grillmasters (2016)
- Staatsloterij: Puur Geluk (2016)
- Idols 6 (2017)
- RTL Gezondheidstest (2018)
- Boxing Stars (2018)
- Ik weet er alles van! (2019 – present)
- The Masked Singer (2019 – present)
- De Erfgenaam (2020 – present)
- Lego Masters (2020–2021, 2025 – present)
- Volg je me nog? (2022)
- Domino Challenge (2022)
- The Big Show met Ruben Nicolai (2022)
- Doet-ie 't of doet-ie 't niet (2024)
- Te land, ter zee en in de lucht (2024)
- Pandora (2026 – present)
- Kopen Zonder Kijken (2026)

=== As team captain ===
- Oh, wat een jaar! (2017–present)
- Wie ben ik? (2018–2021)
- Holland-België (2018–2020)

=== As voice actor ===
- The Angry Birds Movie (2016, Leonard, Dutch dub)
- The Angry Birds Movie 2 (2019, Leonard, Dutch dub)

=== As contestant ===
- De Jongens tegen de Meisjes (2015)
- Het Jachtseizoen (2020)
- Make Up Your Mind (2023)

=== As himself ===
- De Winter Voorbij (2015)
- Casa di Beau Winterspecial (2024)
- Sterren op het Doek (2025)
