= Herman den Blijker =

Dutch chef, restaurateur and television presenter

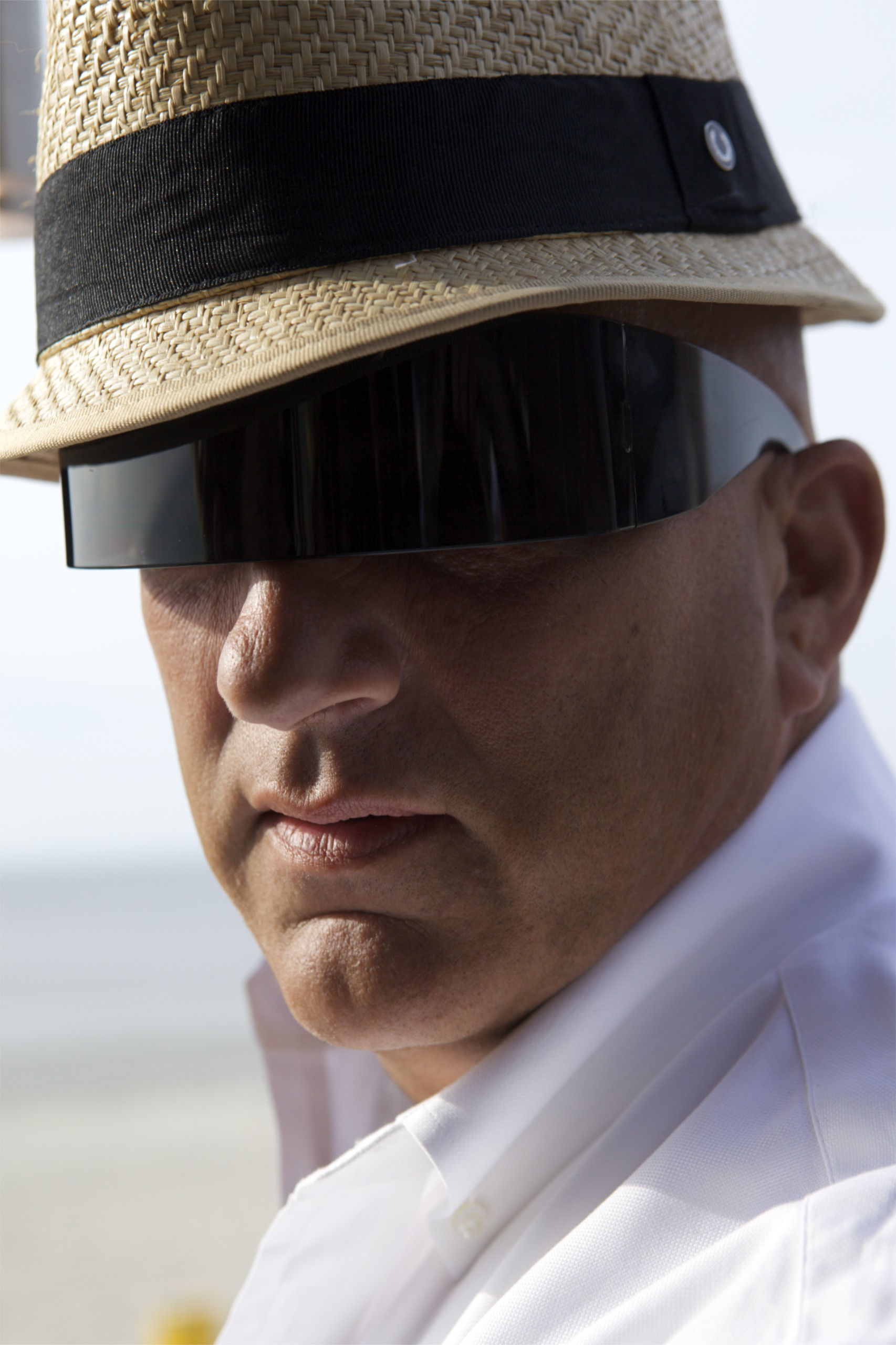
- Den Blijker in 2009
- Born: 21 October 1958 (age 67); Rotterdam, Netherlands
- Occupations: Chef; Restaurateur; Television presenter

Herman den Blijker (born 21 October 1958) is a Dutch celebrity chef, restaurateur and television presenter. His restaurant De Engel in Rotterdam, Netherlands was awarded one Michelin star in 1997. Den Blijker also presented many television shows, including Herman zoekt chef, Mijn Tent is Top and Herrie in de Keuken.

== Career ==
Den Blijker presented many television shows, including Herrie in de Keuken, the Dutch adaptation of the Ramsay's Kitchen Nightmares by British celebrity chef Gordon Ramsay, and Mijn Tent is Top, the Dutch adaptation of the Australian reality television series My Restaurant Rules.

In 2018, Den Blijker and Olcay Gulsen presented the television show De Zelfbouwers in which a school in Rotterdam is converted to an apartment block. It was Den Blijker's first show that wasn't related to food or cooking.

In January 2020, he switched from the television network RTL Nederland to create television shows for Talpa TV. In that same year, he presented the television shows Herman helpt een handje, a show in which he visits organisations and individuals with a food truck, and Crisis in de tent, a show in which he visits restaurants struggling due to the COVID-19 pandemic.

Den Blijker appeared in the third season of the television show De Verraders. In 2014, he appeared as the character Herman den Blikvoer in an edition of the Donald Duck comics magazine.

== Personal life ==
In April 2010, he received mild injuries in a helicopter crash at Rotterdam Airport. The helicopter crashed shortly after take-off.

== Filmography ==
=== As presenter ===
- Herman zoekt chef
- Mijn Tent is Top
- Herrie in de Keuken
- De Zelfbouwers (2018)
- Herman helpt een handje (2020)
- Crisis in de tent (2020)
- De Kookklunzen (2021, 2022)

=== As contestant ===
- Het Perfecte Plaatje (2018)
- Het Jachtseizoen (2021)
- De Verraders (2023)
