= Caroline Tensen =

Dutch television presenter (born 1964)

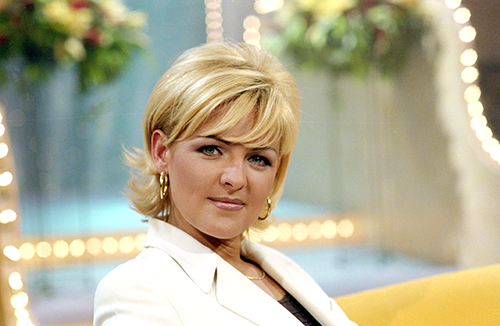
- Tensen in 1996
- Born: 1964 (age 61–62); Haarlem, Netherlands
- Occupation: Television presenter
- Years active: 1986–present
- Known for: Eén Tegen 100
- Awards: Knight in the Order of Orange-Nassau (2017)

Caroline Tensen (born 1964) is a Dutch television presenter. She is known for presenting the quiz show Eén Tegen 100 for more than 25 years. She also presented the shows DNA Onbekend, Het Spijt Me and Wie ben ik? for multiple years each.

== Career ==
=== Early career ===
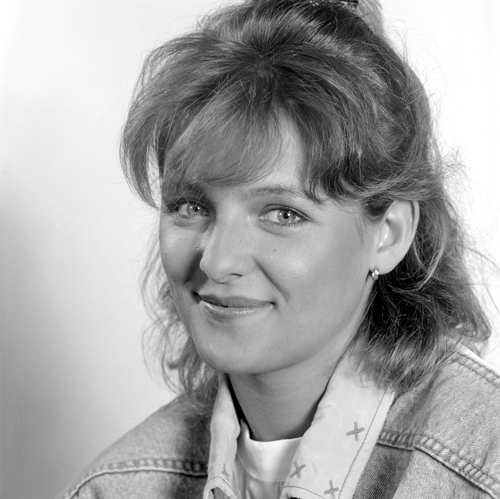
Tensen in 1989.

Tensen began working for broadcaster Veronica as announcer in 1986. Before this, she was involved in promoting the broadcaster to increase membership and she also worked as production assistant for radio broadcasts.

Tensen began working for RTL Véronique in 1989 (which later rebranded as RTL 4). She became presenter of the show Wie ben ik? in 1990 with Ron Brandsteder and André van Duin as team captains. In the show, contestants in two teams are assigned a name or an object and they need to guess who or what they are by asking questions. She presented the show until 1999. Tensen presented the show Het Spijt Me from 1993 to 1999. The show was previously a part of De 5 Uur Show, as the segment Het bloemetje, and it became its own show.

Since 2000, she presents the quiz show Postcode Loterij: Eén Tegen 100 or Eén Tegen 100. The show is sponsored by the Postcode Loterij. Tensen has presented the show since the beginning and for multiple channels and broadcasting associations over the years. In the show, a single contestant competes against 100 other people for a chance to win a cash prize.

Tensen presented the show DNA Onbekend in which people explore their family history. She presented the show from 2009 to 2014 for NCRV (later KRO-NCRV) and from 2016 to 2018 for AVROTROS. The show ended in 2014 due to budget costs by KRO-NCRV and the show returned in 2016 when Tensen switched to work for AVROTROS. In 2016, she presented the television show De stoutste jongen van de klas about guys that were popular at school. The show has been described as a male counterpart of the show Het mooiste meisje van de klas presented by Jaap Jongbloed.

=== RTL ===
In 2019, Tensen became a presenter for RTL 4. The show DNA Onbekend did not move to RTL when she switched to work for RTL and Dionne Stax became the new presenter of the show. Tensen presented a season of Het Spijt Me in 2019, a new version of the show that she presented in the 1990s. This season of the show ended early due to disappointing viewing figures. In the same year, Tensen became a co-host of the show 5 Uur Live. She presented the show together with Daphne Bunskoek, Jamie Trenité and Patrick Martens. The show ended in 2020.

During the COVID-19 pandemic in the Netherlands, the quiz show Eén Tegen 100 was renamed to Eén Tegen 50 with one contestant competing against 50 people. Tensen presented the show's 500th episode in November 2020. The show changed back to its original format with 100 contestants in 2023. She presented two seasons of the show Wie ben ik? in 2020 and 2021. Ruben Nicolai and Tijl Beckand were the team captains in the show.

Tensen, Angela Groothuizen and Natasja Froger became presenters of the show Five Days Inside in 2020 as Beau van Erven Dorens stopped presenting the show to focus on his talk show Beau. In each episode, the presenter spends five days in an organisation that generally isn't open to the public. She visited Het Passion, a Christian organisation helping homeless people, and De Hartenberg, a residential care park of 's Heeren Loo, an organisation helping people with an intellectual disability or behavioral problems. Tensen and Angela Groothuizen were replaced by Rick Brandsteder and Geraldine Kemper as presenters of the show in 2021.

Tensen presented the show De Reis van je Genen in 2021 in which people look at their family and relatives after taking a DNA test. She presented the first season of Kopen of Slopen, a television show about buying a new home or renovating one's current home, in 2023. She presented a second season in late 2024 and early 2025. In 2025, Tensen hosted the radio quiz Geer tegen 100, a variant of her quiz show Eén Tegen 100, in which radio DJ Gerard Ekdom and 100 contestants answered questions about music. The quiz was held to mark Ekdom's 10 year anniversary hosting an early morning show on Dutch radio.

In 2026, she became one of the presenters of the ninth season of the show Kopen Zonder Kijken after Martijn Krabbé was no longer able to present the show due to his health. Krabbé did the voice-over and the show was presented by multiple presenters. In the show, people purchase a home without having seen it first and the team of Kopen Zonder Kijken makes all relevant decisions based on budget and preferences. Since May 2026, Buddy Vedder appears as sidekick in the quiz show Eén Tegen 100. Since September 2026, Tensen and Hugo Kennis present Thuis aan Tafel, a show about food and lifestyle.

=== Columnist ===
Tensen is a columnist for the magazine Beau Monde and 44 of these columns were published in the book Caroline in 2007.

=== Television appearances ===
Tensen was a contestant in the 2012 season of the game show Ranking the Stars. She was one of the crew members in the 2024 television show Over de Oceaan in which celebrities sail across the Atlantic Ocean. She was head of the kitchen on the ship. Tensen was a contestant in a 2024 episode of the singing television show DNA Singers. She took part in the 2025 season of the photography television show Het Perfecte Plaatje in which contestants compete to create the best photo in various challenges.

== Personal life ==
Tensen was born in Haarlem in 1964. In 2017, she was decorated Knight in the Order of Orange-Nassau. The award ceremony was held in April 2018 and she received the award from politician Jozias van Aartsen, acting mayor of Amsterdam at the time.

== Selected filmography ==
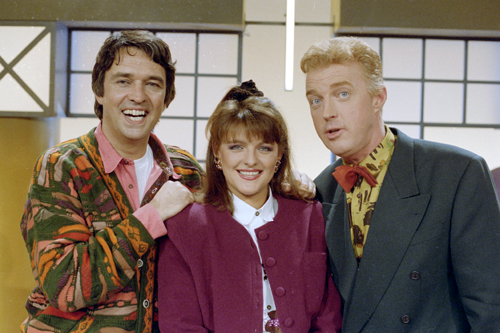
Tensen as presenter of Wie ben ik? in 1990 with Ron Brandsteder and André van Duin as team captains.

=== As presenter ===
- Wie ben ik? (1990–1999, 2020–2021)
- DNA Onbekend (2009–2014, 2016–2018)
- Eén Tegen 100 (2000–present)
- De stoutste jongen van de klas (2016)
- Het Spijt Me (1993–1999, 2019)
- 5 Uur Live (2019–2020)
- Five Days Inside (2020)
- De Reis van je Genen (2021)
- Kopen of Slopen (2023–2025)
- Kopen Zonder Kijken (2026)
- Thuis aan Tafel (2026–present)

=== As contestant ===
- Ranking the Stars (2012)
- The Masked Singer (2020)
- Over de Oceaan (2024)
- DNA Singers (2024)
- Het Perfecte Plaatje (2025)

=== As guest ===
- Casa di Beau (2024)
