= Zie Ze Vliegen =

- Genre: Comedy mockumentary
- Created by: Original British version: Matt Lucas; David Walliams; Dutch version: Carlo Boszhard; Herald Adolfs
- Starring: Carlo Boszhard; Irene Moors; Chantal Janzen; Gordon Heuckeroth
- Narrated by: Vivian Boelen
- Composer: David Arnold
- Country of origin: Netherlands
- Original language: Dutch
- No. of series: 1
- No. of episodes: 6 (+1 special)

Production
- Running time: 32 minutes

Original release
- Network: RTL 4
- Release: 20 August – 1 October 2011

Related
- Come Fly with Me (2010 TV series); Little Britain; Airport; Luton Airport; Airline

Zie Ze Vliegen is a Dutch mockumentary television comedy series, based entirely on British mockumentary Come Fly With Me - with the script and characters almost exactly the same. The series stars Carlo Boszhard, Irene Moors, Chantal Janzen and Gordon Heuckeroth. The series was narrated by Vivian Boelen. A spoof of airport documentaries, the series follows the activity at a fictional airport (stated as one of the busiest in Benelux and three fictional airlines: GoedkoopAir (a low-cost airline), FlyLimburg (GoedkoopAir's low-cost competitor) and KNL (a major international Dutch airline). Boszhard and Moors portray many of the focal airline and airport staff, as well as some passengers, whose comments and experiences are featured in one or more of the series episodes in the style of a "fly-on-the-wall documentary". The show first aired on 20 August 2011 on RTL 4.

The series was made available in DVD format on December 1, 2011.

== Production ==
The script is an almost exact copy of the programme it is based on, written by David Walliams and Matt Lucas. The series was filmed on location at Rotterdam The Hague Airport in the summer of 2011.

== Airlines ==
- GoedkoopAir (based on FlyLo), a budget airline owned by businessman Omar Baba. Baba, and check-in girls Melanie and Kelly, make sure everything is as "cheap" as possible.
- FlyLimburg (based on Our Lady Air), a budget airline based in the south of Netherlands, which is the main competitor of GoedkoopAir. One steward, Eugene, tries to make passengers feel as comfortable as possible to win "Steward of the Year Award".
- KNL (based on Great British Air), a major international Dutch airline with staff such as Moses Leidsman (passenger liaison officer), Petra Kant (snobbish Business Class air hostess), and Jacqueline and Hendrik (married pilot couple) who almost always fly together.

== Main characters ==
- Omar Baba (Boszhard) – The double-chinned, flamboyantly asinine owner of low-cost airline GoedkoopAir. Baba is a parody of the controversial Greek-Cypriot "low-cost flying" entrepreneur, Stelios Haji-Ioannou (the founder of British low-cost airline Easyjet).
- Priscilla Matras (Boszhard) – A Surinamese woman who professes to be a devout Christian, she is the manager of the airport's coffee kiosk, Koffiehut. She tries to invent different excuses as to why her coffee shop is almost always closed.
- Moses Leidsman (Boszhard) – The gushing, effeminate executive passenger liaison officer for KNL. He is always offering help to passengers but always turns out not quite how he expects.
- Ingrid Voet (Moors) – The pompous and racist chief immigration officer, who often comes up with ridiculous reasons not to allow a foreign person into the country.
- Tommy Kroes (Boszhard) – A young, obtuse man working at Happy Burger, one of the airport's fast-food eateries. He hopes to work his way up to becoming a pilot, happily unaware that the two jobs are completely unrelated.
- Samir (Gordon) – Samir is a young man who works as part of the roving ground crew for GoedkoopAir. He sports a shaved head and a chin curtain beard.
- Melanie (Boszhard) and Kelly (Moors) – Two snarky check-in girls at Rotterdam The Hague Airport for GoedkoopAir.
- Tonnie (Moors) and Jaap (Boszhard) – Two shaggy paparazzi who haunt the airport's hallways, constantly messing up in their photo-shooting activities.
- Eugene de Vlaoi (Gordon) – A gay air steward for airline FlyLimburg, who leads a destructive campaign in order to become Employee of the Year, and has a huge family who are cabin crew at the airline.
- Ben de Roo (Boszhard) and Ria Munster (Moors) – Two Dutch airport customs officers, with rather extreme methods of cataloguing the illegal substances they find, such as sampling drugs.
- Jacqueline de Bruin (Moors) and Hendrik de Bruin (Boszhard) – A husband-and-wife pilot team, flying for KNL. Jacqueline constantly brings up the fact that Hendrik committed adultery with stewardess Sandra Scheur; the reason they now fly together.
- Peter de Vries (Boszhard) and Irma de Vries (Janzen) – Holiday makers who have suffered several horrific and surrealistic trips abroad after buying destination packages from GoedkoopAir. Irma's husband, Peter, is forced to take a subordinate stance to her overbearing personality.
- Petra Kant (Boszhard) – A very elitist business-class stewardess for KNL's long haul flights.
- Sjon (Boszhard) and Cygnet (Moors) – Father-and-daughter baggage handlers, who steal from passengers' luggage and are generally less than careful with it.
