= Ruben van der Meer =

Dutch actor and comedian (born 1970)

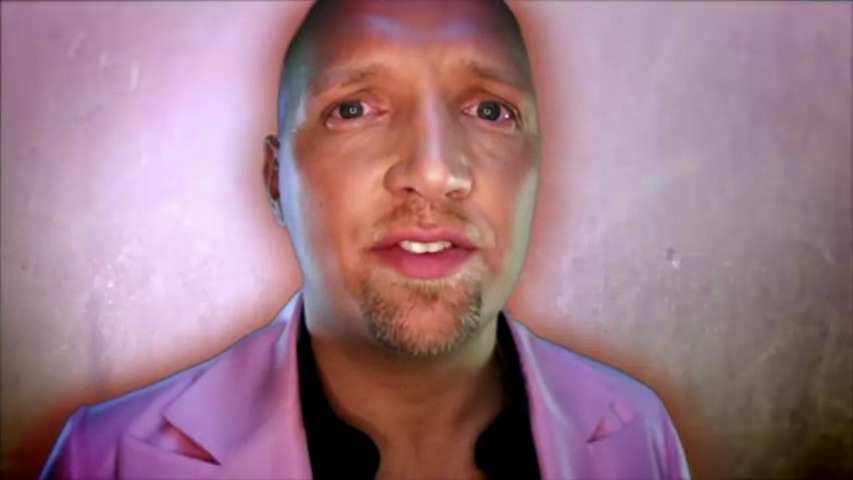
- Born: 2 June 1970 (age 56); Amsterdam, Netherlands
- Occupations: Actor; Comedian

Ruben van der Meer (born 2 June 1970) is a Dutch actor and comedian. He is known as one of the comedians in the television show De Lama's together with Tijl Beckand, Ruben Nicolai and Jeroen van Koningsbrugge. He played roles in several films, including Amsterdam Vice (2019) and Yamas! (2024).

== Career ==
=== Music ===
Van der Meer became known as one of the members of the Dutch comedy gabber band Hakkûhbar.

=== Film ===
Van der Meer plays a role in the 2015 film J. Kessels directed by Erik de Bruyn. The film was the opening film of the 2015 Netherlands Film Festival. In 2019, he played a role in Amsterdam Vice (Baantjer: Het Begin) by Arne Toonen. The film won the Golden Film award two weeks later after having sold 100,000 tickets. He played a lead role in the 2024 comedy film Yamas! directed by Andy van Veen en Rik Sinkeldam.

In 2026, Van der Meer produced the crime comedy film Bad Slippers. He directed the film together with Michael Winter. Van der Meer also plays a lead role in the film.

=== Television ===
Between 2004 and 2008 he formed part of the core team of comedians in the television show De Lama's, together with Ruben Nicolai, Tijl Beckand and Jeroen van Koningsbrugge. The show was very popular and won the Gouden Televizier-ring in 2006, a prestigious Dutch television award.

In 2009, Van der Meer presented the show Budget TV together with Ruben Nicolai and Tijl Beckand. The show ended after ten episodes due to disappointing viewing figures. They also performed shows in theatre with the same name.

Between 2010 and 2015 he took part in the television game show Echt Waar?! together with Tijl Beckand. The host of the show was Jack Spijkerman. Van der Meer was a panel member in 2016 show Met de deur in huis presented by Kees Tol. It is the Dutch version of the British show Through the Keyhole. In the show, Tineke Schouten visits homes of Dutch celebrities and the panel members have to guess whose house it is. Van der Meer was a contestant in the 2018 cooking television show Superstar Chef in which duos composed of a celebrity and a chef compete against other duos to prepare the best dishes.

Since 2023, he appears in the comedy television show LOL: Last One Laughing which airs on Prime Video. The show is the Dutch version of the Japanese television show Documental. In 2023, he appeared in the television game show Alles is Muziek in which two teams competed by recreating songs using everyday objects.

Van der Meer performed as drag queen Sydney Lekker in the 2024 season of the drag queen show Make up your Mind. He traveled to Zambia together with Daphne Bunskoek and presenter Humberto Tan for an episode of the 2025 photography television show Gelukkig Hebben We De Foto's Nog.

He is one of the comedians in the 2026 improvisation comedy television show Wat Speelt Er presented by Patrick Lodiers.

=== Theatre ===
Since 2022, Van der Meer, Tijl Beckand, Ruben Nicolai and Jeroen van Koningsbrugge perform theatre shows under the name TAFKAL (The Artists Formerly Known As Lama's).

== Selected filmography ==
=== As actor ===
- Jesus Is a Palestinian (1999)
- The Delivery (1999)
- Schnitzel Paradise (2005)
- Love is All (2007)
- J. Kessels (2015)
- De Zevende Hemel (2016)
- Amsterdam Vice (2019, Baantjer: Het Begin)
- Yamas! (2024)

=== As contestant / himself ===
- Het Perfecte Plaatje (2018)
- Superstar Chef (2018)
- Alles is Muziek (2023)
- LOL: Last One Laughing (2023 – present, Prime Video)
- Make up your Mind (2024)
- Casa di Beau (2025)
- Gelukkig Hebben We De Foto's Nog (2025)
