= Gehaktdag =

Dutch television show

- Genre: Satire
- Presented by: Ruben Nicolai
- Starring: Tijl Beckand; Horace Cohen
- Country of origin: Netherlands
- Original language: Dutch

Original release
- Release: 12 February – 9 April 2010

Gehaktdag is a Dutch television show. It was aired on Fridays on Nederland 3 by the AVRO. In the show, a Dutch celebrity is satirically critiqued by two teams. The show was presented by Ruben Nicolai and the team captains were Tijl Beckand and Horace Cohen. The show first aired on 12 February 2010 and ran until 9 April 2010. In total, nine episodes were broadcast.

== Overview ==
The show consists of three rounds, regarding the guest's past, present and future, and in each round, a team member holds a satirical monologue. A point is awarded based on the response of the studio audience using a clap-o-meter. However, the measurements of the clap-o-meter are never shown to the viewers. It is not uncommon for the speaker to make fun of team members or members of the other team, in particular to Horace Cohen.

Guests included Rita Verdonk, Sander Lantinga and Martin Simek.

== List of episodes ==
Each episode features one guest, in chronological order:

- Rita Verdonk
- Tatjana Simić
- Sander Lantinga
- Patricia Paay
- Martin Simek
- Lange Frans
- Wilma Nanninga
- Stacey Rookhuizen
- Prem Radhakishun

== See also ==
- Roast (comedy)
