= Tijl Beckand =

Dutch television presenter and comedian (born 1974)

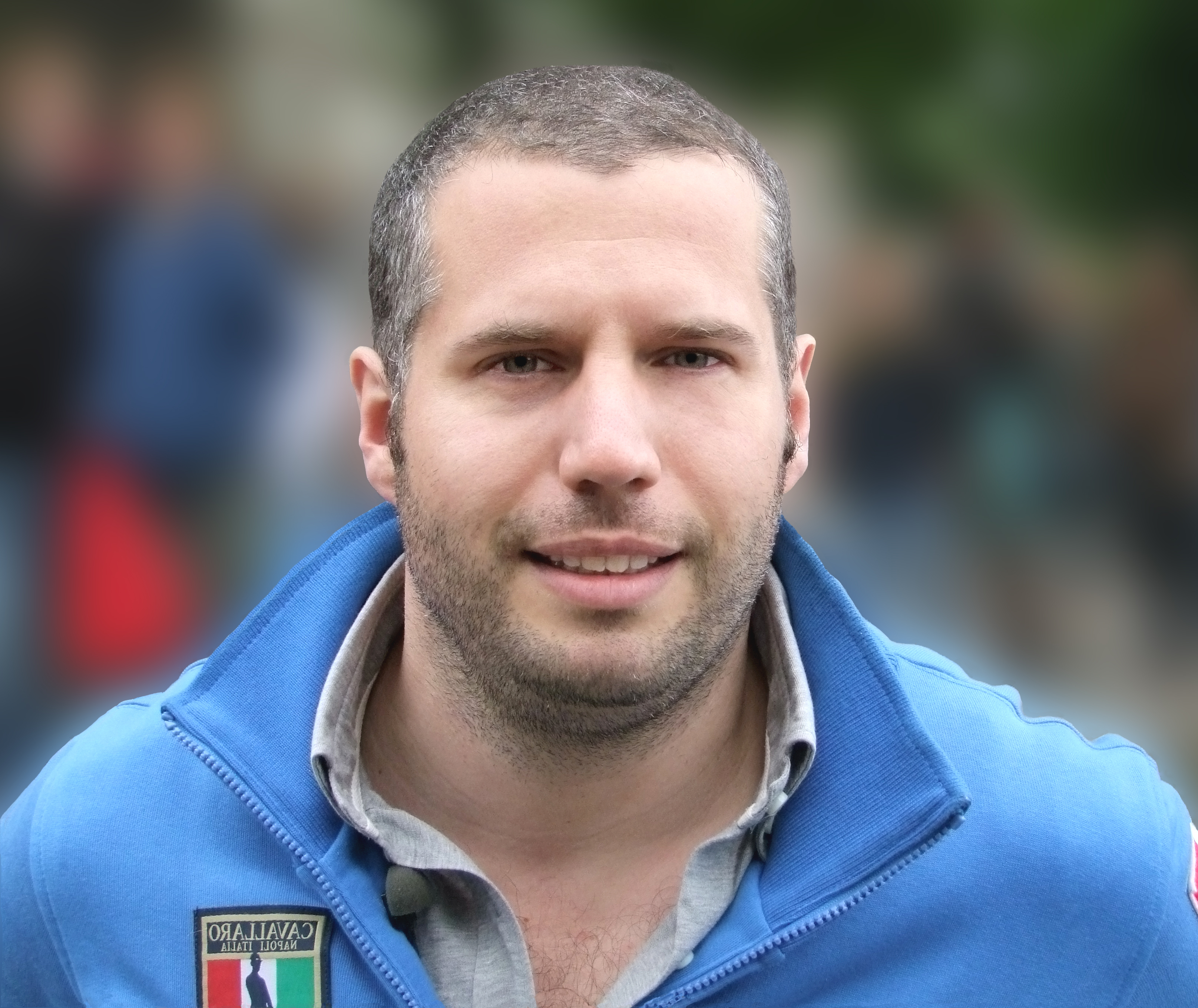
- Beckand in 2010
- Born: Tijl Maria Theresia Beckand; 30 July 1974 (age 52); The Hague, Netherlands
- Occupations: Television presenter; Comedian

Tijl Beckand (born 30 July 1974) is a Dutch television presenter and stand-up comedian. He is known as one of the comedians in the television show De Lama's together with Ruben Nicolai, Ruben van der Meer and Jeroen van Koningsbrugge. He also presents the television shows Het Perfecte Plaatje and De Verraders.

Beckand has presented multiple television shows about classical music, including De Tiende van Tijl, Tijl in het voetspoor van Bach and Tijl in het voetspoor van Richard Wagner.

== Career ==
Between 2004 and 2008, Beckand formed part of the core team of comedians in the television show De Lama's, together with Ruben Nicolai, Ruben van der Meer and Jeroen van Koningsbrugge. The show is a Dutch adaptation of the show Whose Line Is It Anyway?. In 2006, they won the Gouden Televizier-Ring award for the show. Beckand presented the 2009 show Budget TV together with Ruben Nicolai and Ruben van der Meer. The show ended after ten episodes due to disappointing viewing figures. They also performed shows in theatre with the same name.

In 2010, Beckand was one of the team captains in the television show Gehaktdag in which a Dutch celebrity was satirically critiqued by two teams. Between 2010 and 2015 he took part in the television game show Echt Waar?! together with Ruben van der Meer. The host of this show was Jack Spijkerman. Beckand was one of the jury members in the television show Superkids, a talent competition show for children. He was the team captain of the male team in the game show De Jongens tegen de Meisjes between 2011 and 2018. He played a role in the 2011 mockumentary comedy television series Zie Ze Vliegen, based on British mockumentary Come Fly With Me. Beckand is also the presenter of De Tiende van Tijl, a show about classical music.

Ruben Nicolai and Tijl Beckand presented Professor Nicolai & Dr. Beckand, a quiz and game show with small scientific experiments and questions about science. In the show, science journalist and presenter Diederik Jekel helps to explain the scientific concepts and experiments. Since 2016, Beckand presents the photography game show Het Perfecte Plaatje in which contestants compete to create the best photo in various challenges. He also presented the 2017 television show Tijl B op volle toeren, a music television show, and the show can be seen as Tijl Beckand's version of the show Ali B op volle toeren presented by Moroccan-Dutch rapper Ali B.

In 2018, Ruben Nicolai and Tijl Beckand became team captains in the game show Wie ben ik? presented by Wendy van Dijk and later by Caroline Tensen. In the show, contestants in two teams are assigned a name or an object and they need to guess who or what they are by asking questions. He also presented the 2018 cooking television show Superstar Chef in which duos composed of a celebrity and a chef compete against other duos to prepare the best dishes. Beckand and Katja Schuurman presented the 2019 television series Gemaakt in Nederland about how products of several Dutch brands are produced. In the same year, he presented the show Tijl in het voetspoor van Bach about composer Johann Sebastian Bach.

Beckand and Julie Van den Steen presented the 2021 game show Game of Talents in which a Dutch duo and a Flemish duo compete against each other in each episode. In the show, the teams have to guess which talent the person on stage has. At the end of 2021 and 2022, he presented the quiz show De TV Kijker van het Jaar in which contestants answer questions about Dutch television of the past year. He was team captain in the 2022 show Volg je me nog? in which two teams answer questions about online media. Since 2022, Beckand, Ruben van der Meer, Ruben Nicolai and Jeroen van Koningsbrugge perform theatre shows under the name TAFKAL (The Artists Formerly Known As Lama's).

In 2021, 2022 and 2023, Beckand presented the television show De Verraders. He also presented a season of the show in 2024, 2025 and 2026. The show became a franchise (The Traitors) with many international versions.

Beckand presented two seasons of the quiz show De 1% Quiz in 2022, the Dutch version of the British quiz show The 1% Club. In 2023, he presented the first season of De Moeite Waard?!, a show which follows people attempting to flip a house. Beckand presented the show Tijl in het voetspoor van Richard Wagner about composer Richard Wagner in 2024. He also presented the quiz show Waar Gaat Het Over? in 2023 and 2024. The show aired in the summer during the summer break of the soap opera Goede tijden, slechte tijden.

Beckand published the children's picture book Een huis voor Sinterklaas in 2025. The story features Sinterklaas.

== Selected filmography ==
=== As presenter ===
- De Lama's (2004–2008)
- Budget TV (2009)
- De Tiende van Tijl
- Professor Nicolai & Dr. Beckand (2015–2018)
- Het Perfecte Plaatje (2016–present)
- Tijl B op volle toeren (2017)
- Superstar Chef (2018)
- Dancing with the Stars (2019)
- Gemaakt in Nederland (2019)
- Tijl in het voetspoor van Bach (2019)
- Game of Talents (2021)
- De TV Kijker van het Jaar (2021, 2022)
- De 1% Quiz (2022)
- De Verraders (2021–present)
- De Moeite Waard?! (2023–present)
- Waar Gaat Het Over? (2023, 2024)
- Tijl in het voetspoor van Richard Wagner (2024)

=== As actor ===
- Zie Ze Vliegen (2011)

=== As team captain ===
- Gehaktdag (2010)
- De Jongens tegen de Meisjes (2011–2018)
- Wie ben ik? (2018–2021)
- Volg je me nog? (2022)
- Beste Kijkers

== Bibliography ==
- Een huis voor Sinterklaas (2025)
