= Jeroen van Koningsbrugge =

Dutch actor, comedian and presenter (born 1973)

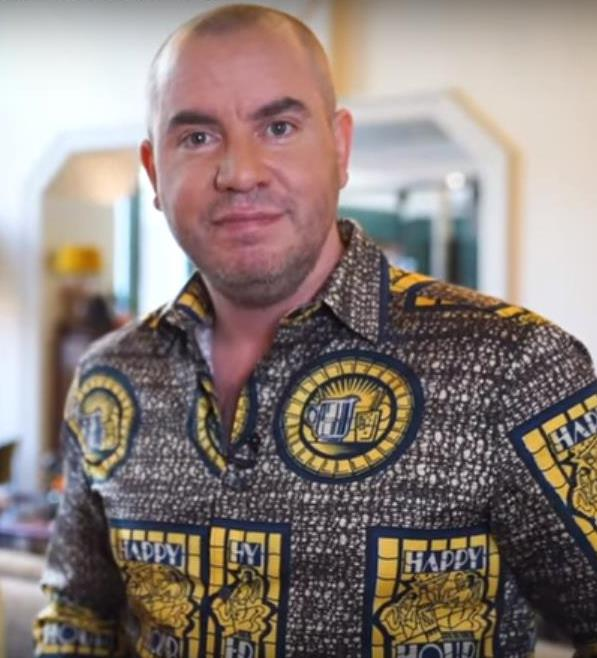
- van Koningsbrugge in 2019
- Born: 3 September 1973 (age 53); Nispen, Netherlands
- Occupations: Actor, comedian, singer, director, presenter
- Years active: 1999–present

Jeroen van Koningsbrugge (born 3 September 1973) is a Dutch actor, comedian, singer, director and presenter. He was a member of the television programme De Lama's and together with his friend Dennis van de Ven he makes the satirical television shows Neonletters and Draadstaal. Together with Van de Ven he has a band called Jurk!.

== Career ==
Van Koningsbrugge is known as one of the comedians in the television show De Lama's together with Tijl Beckand, Ruben van der Meer and Ruben Nicolai. The show is a Dutch adaptation of the show Whose Line Is It Anyway?. In 2006, they won the Gouden Televizier-Ring award for the show.

Van Koningsbrugge is also a film actor. He won the Best Actor Rembrandt Award for his role in the 2010 film Loft directed by Antoinette Beumer. He played roles in the films Clean Hands (2015) and Riphagen (2016).

He played the role of Judas Iscariot in the 2015 edition of The Passion, a Dutch Passion Play held every Maundy Thursday since 2011. Van Koningsbrugge and Beau van Erven Dorens presented the 2016 edition of De Nationale IQ Test. In 2020, he was one of the panel members in the first season of the television show I Can See Your Voice. Since 2022, Van Koningsbrugge, Tijl Beckand, Ruben van der Meer and Ruben Nicolai perform theatre shows under the name TAFKAL (The Artists Formerly Known As Lama's).

He was one of the team captains in the 2023 television show Alles is Muziek presented by Marieke Elsinga. The show ended after six episodes as a result of disappointing viewing figures. He also presents the show Jeroen’s Abandoned Adventures in which he travels to abandoned places. The first season of the show aired in 2024.

Van Koningsbrugge has presented multiple seasons of the television show Kamp Van Koningsbrugge in which civilians undergo special forces training. In 2025, he presented Strijders, a competitive show which has been described as a spin-off of Kamp Van Koningsbrugge. In the show, two teams led by former commandos Ray Klaassens and Dai Carter compete against each other in physical challenges.

Since September 2025, he appears in commercials of the supermarket chain Albert Heijn. He plays a role in the 2026 television series Rippers which airs on Videoland.

=== Television appearances ===
He was interviewed by Jeroen Pauw in an episode of the television show 5 jaar later.

== Personal life ==
Van Koningsbrugge and actress Marie-Claire Witlox married in 2005 in Las Vegas.

== Selected filmography ==
Year	Title	Role	Notes
2009	Luke and Lucy: The Texas Rangers		
2010	Loft	Willem	
2015	The Surprise	Jacob	
2015	Clean Hands	Eddie Kronenburg	
2016	Riphagen	Bernardus Andreas "Dries" Riphagen	
2019	Spider-Man: Far From Home	Dutch Hooligan	

=== Television ===
Year	Title	Role	Notes
2020	I Can See Your Voice	Panel member	
2023	DNA Singers	Team captain	
2023	Alles is Muziek	Team captain	
	Beste Kijkers	Team captain	
