= Kinderen geen bezwaar =

Dutch sitcom

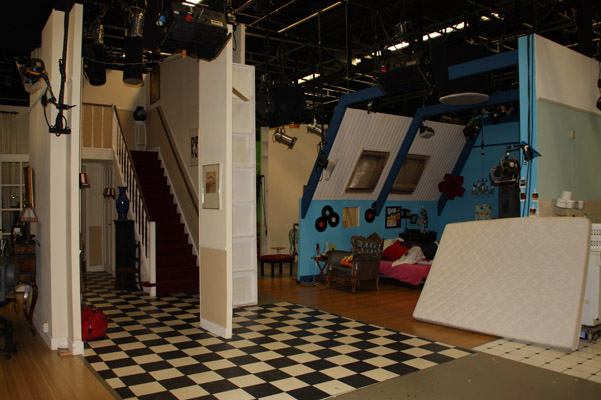
- The set
- Genre: sitcom
- Written by: Haye van der Heyden
- Country of origin: Netherlands
- Original language: Dutch
- No. of seasons: 9
- No. of episodes: 210

Production
- Running time: 25 min.
- Production company: VARA/Comedy Unlimited

Original release
- Network: Nederland 1
- Release: 25 September 2004 – January 2013

Related
- Oppassen!!!; My Family

Kinderen geen bezwaar ("Children No Objection") is a Dutch sitcom, developed by the VARA and written by Haye van der Heyden. The first episode aired on Nederland 1 on 25 September 2004, replacing the popular series Oppassen!!!. After the ninth season, which was scheduled to air in January 2013, the series was not renewed. This is the result of a recurring discussion whether Dutch public television should provide comedy or not. The last six episodes were filmed from 29 May till 7 July 2012. Repeats of Kinderen geen bezwaar attracted audiences of more than one million people.

Anita Witzier, Hans Klok, Chantal Janzen, Edwin Rutten and others did cameos in Kinderen geen bezwaar.

== Premise ==
Gerard van Doorn (Alfred van den Heuvel) and Maud Zegers (Anne-Mieke Ruyten) are a married couple. They met each other through a personal advertisement (hence the title, Kinderen geen bezwaar, which translates to Children no objection). They live with two children from previous marriages: Gerard's son Daan (Joey van der Velden) and Maud's daughter Julia (Céline Purcell). Maud works as a psychotherapist and Gerard is a homemaker. As such, Gerard doesn't fit the stereotypical profile of Dutch men and Maud often ridicules him for being unmanly.

== Cast ==
- Alfred van den Heuvel
- Anne-Mieke Ruyten
- Céline Purcell
- Joey van der Velden
- Bobbie Koek
- Rufus Hegeman
- Ingeborg Elzevier
- Bart Oomen

== Trivia ==
- Ruyten's real husband, Ron Cornet, plays a patient of hers.
