= Draadstaal =

Dutch television show

- Genre: Satire
- Created by: Jeroen van Koningsbrugge; Dennis van de Ven
- Country of origin: Netherlands
- Original language: Dutch
- No. of seasons: 16

Original release
- Network: Nederland 3
- Release: 14 September 2007

Draadstaal ("Wire Steel" or "Rebar") is a Dutch satirical sketch comedy television program produced by CCCP and broadcast by VPRO, a Dutch broadcaster. It was created by CCCP and Jeroen van Koningsbrugge and Dennis van de Ven. The first seasons aired 14 September 2007 to 22 November 2010. After a couple of years it was restarted in 2015 and new episodes are still being made in 2025. The show featured a lot of recurring stereotypical comedy characters.

The program is reminiscent of the work of Dutch comedy duo Van Kooten en De Bie.
