= Clean Hands (2015 film) =

2015 film

- Directed by: Tjebbo Penning
- Starring: Jeroen van Koningsbrugge; Thekla Reuten
- Distributed by: Dutch FilmWorks
- Release date: 10 September 2015
- Running time: 1h 48min
- Country: Netherlands
- Language: Dutch

Clean Hands (Dutch: Schone handen) is a 2015 Dutch crime film directed by Tjebbo Penning.

== Cast ==
- Jeroen van Koningsbrugge - Eddie Kronenburg
- Thekla Reuten - Sylvia Kronenburg
- Bente Fokkens - Daphne Kronenburg
- Nino den Brave - Yuri Kronenburg
- Teun Kuilboer - Charlie Kronenburg
- Angela Schijf - Chantal
- Cees Geel - Brandsma
- Frederik Brom - Tromp
- Tjebbo Gerritsma - Frans
