= Diederik Jekel =

Dutch journalist and television presenter

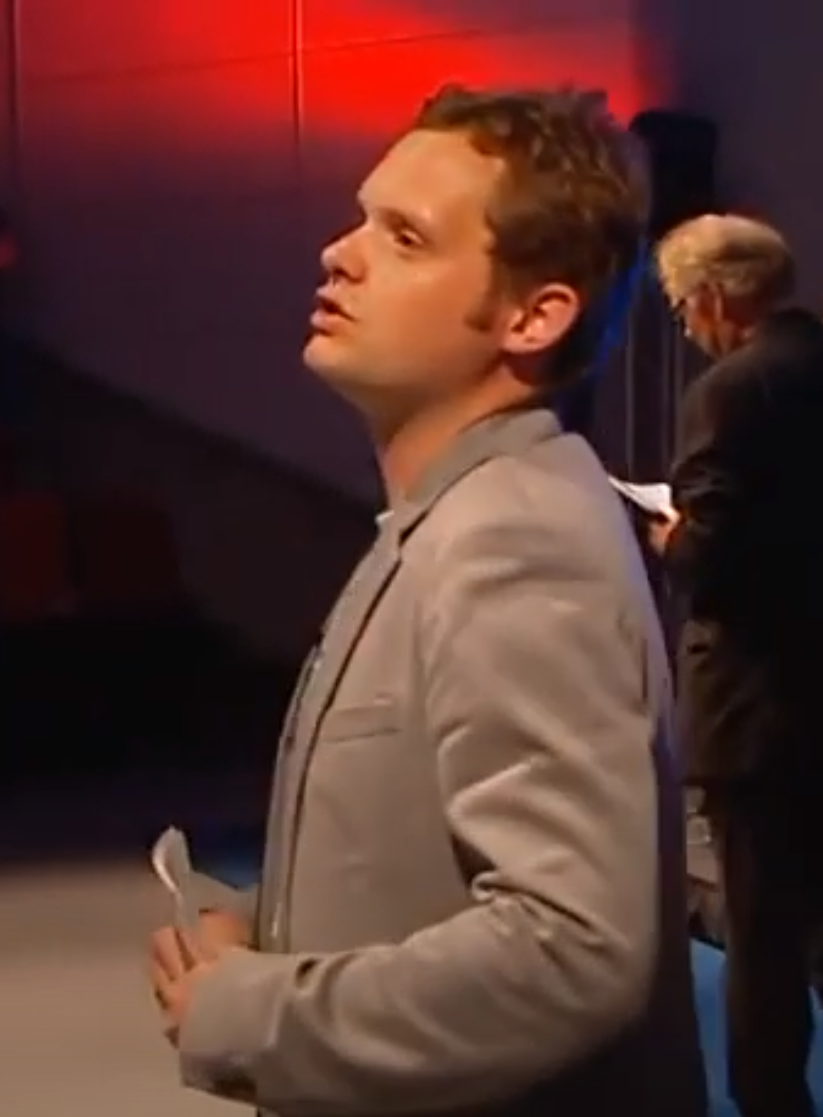
- Jekel in 2011
- Born: 22 June 1984 (age 41); Bilthoven, the Netherlands
- Occupations: Science journalist; Television presenter

Diederik Jekel (Dutch pronunciation: [ˈdidərɪk ˈjeːkəl]; born 22 June 1984) is a Dutch science journalist, television presenter and physicist. In 2018, he was elected president of the Dutch Physical Society (NNV).

== Career ==
Jekel was born in Bilthoven, the Netherlands. He studied physics at Twente University, where he obtained a Master's degree in physics in 2010. Since 2011 he regularly appeared in the early-evening Dutch television talk show De Wereld Draait Door to discuss science-related topics. In 2013, he acted as a host alongside Matthijs van Nieuwkerk and Isolde Hallensleben, in the spin-off television programme De wereld leert door, in which scientists were interviewed about their research. Between 2015 and 2018, Jekel explained scientific concepts and experiments in the Dutch television game show Professor Nicolai & Dr. Beckand, presented by Ruben Nicolai and Tijl Beckand. In 2016, he won the National IQ Test with an IQ of 137.

He was one of the contestants in the 17th season of the Dutch television show Wie is de Mol? where he finished in 3rd place. In 2018 and 2019, Jekel and Elisabeth van Nimwegen presented the television show De Kennis van Nu. In 2020, Jekel and Patty Brard presented the Dutch television series Brard & Jekel: VetGelukkig?! about people who are overweight. In that same year, he appeared in the second season of the television show The Masked Singer.

Since 2021, he appears as one of the Champions in Beat The Champions, the Dutch adaptation of the British game show The Chase's spin-off Beat the Chasers. In 2021, he also played the role of traitor in the television show De Verraders.

In 2022, he looked at historic scientific experiments in the Dutch television series Jekels Jacht.

Jekel and Jon Karthaus are the script writers of the 2022 Dutch feature film Costa!!.

Jekel and Anna Gimbrère won the Irispenning 2025 award for their contributions to science communication.

== Selected filmography ==
=== As presenter / host / expert ===
- De wereld leert door (2013)
- Professor Nicolai & Dr. Beckand (2015 – 2018)
- De Kennis van Nu (2018, 2019)
- Brard & Jekel: VetGelukkig?! (2020)
- Jekels Jacht (2022)

=== As expert ===
- Beat The Champions (2021 – 2023)

=== As contestant ===
- De slimste mens (2014)
- National IQ Test (2016)
- Wie is de Mol? (2017)
- The Masked Singer (2020)
- De Verraders (2021)
- Het Zwaard van Damocles (2025)

== Awards ==
- Irispenning 2025

== Publications ==
Jekel's publications include:

- Ironing out pnictides, Master's thesis Twente University, 2010. In Dutch.
- Zeven rampen die niet gaan gebeuren, Contact, Amsterdam, 2011. In Dutch.
- Bèta voor alfa's, Uitgeverij Atlas Contact, Amsterdam, 2014. Reeks Kleine boekjes. In Dutch.
- with André Kuipers et al., Antidepressiva en agressie, wiskunde redt mensenlevens, Hannover Messe. DVD video, NTR, Hilversum, 2014. In Dutch.
