= Prem Radhakishun =

Dutch-Surinamese lawyer and columnist

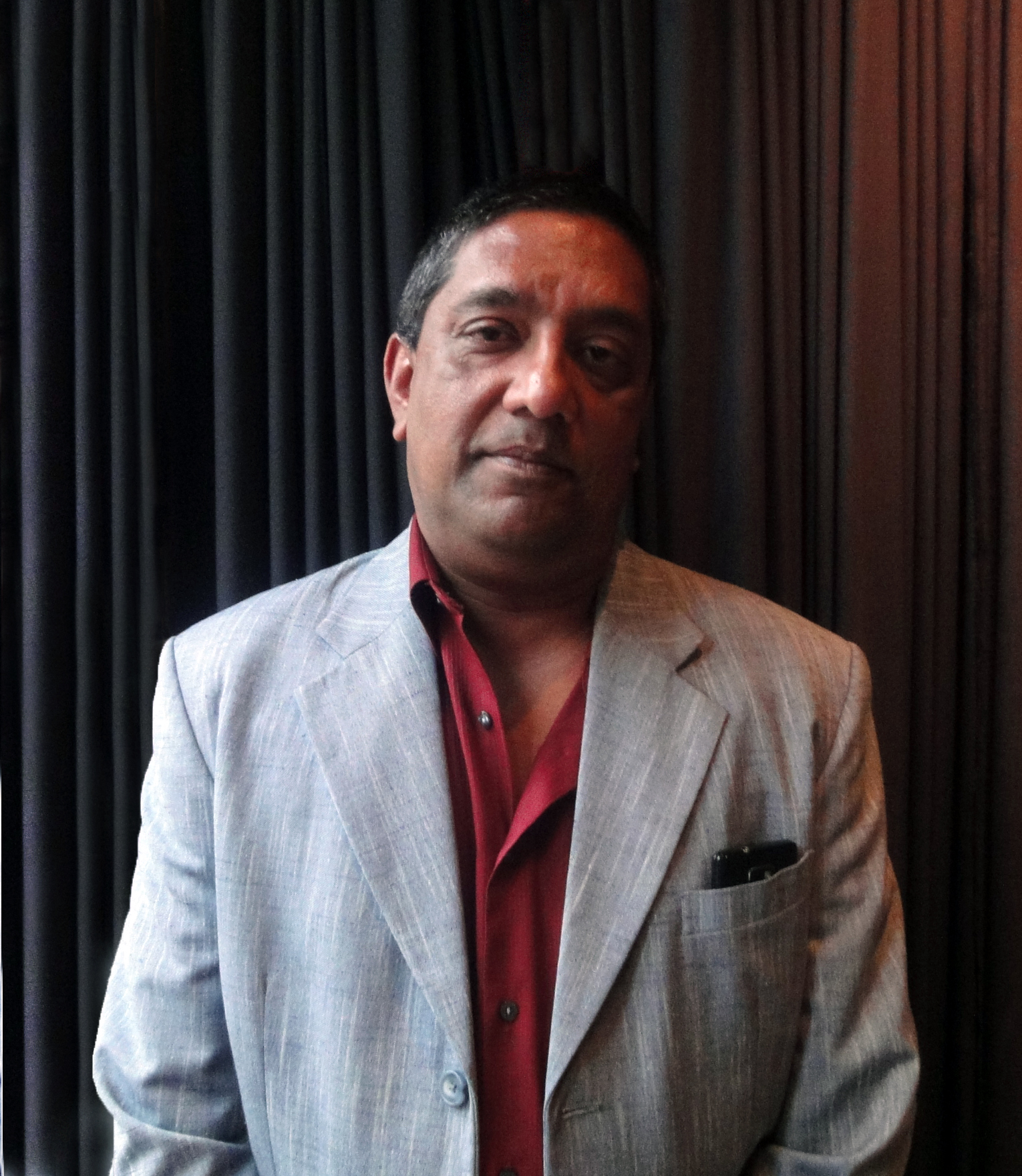
Prem Radhakishun

Prem Shivram Shaw Radhakishun (Paramaribo, 4 February 1962) is a Dutch-Surinamese lawyer, columnist, actor and radio and television producer.

Radhakishun presented the NPS television program Premtime, which ran from 2003 to 2008. The program was an informative television program about the multicultural society in which the quality of the Dutch society is tested. In Premtime, Radhakishun paid attention to the multicultural society. This resulted a few times in clashes with Moroccan youth in particular.

From April 2009 to September 2010, Radhakishun presented the opinion program PepTalk of BNR. He was also the presenter of the television program De Herkansing (The Second Chance), in which the youth who have difficulties at home or at school get a second chance. In 2006 he was suspended for one year as a lawyer for failing to fulfill its administrative and financial obligations.
