= De Lama's =

Dutch television show (2004-2008)

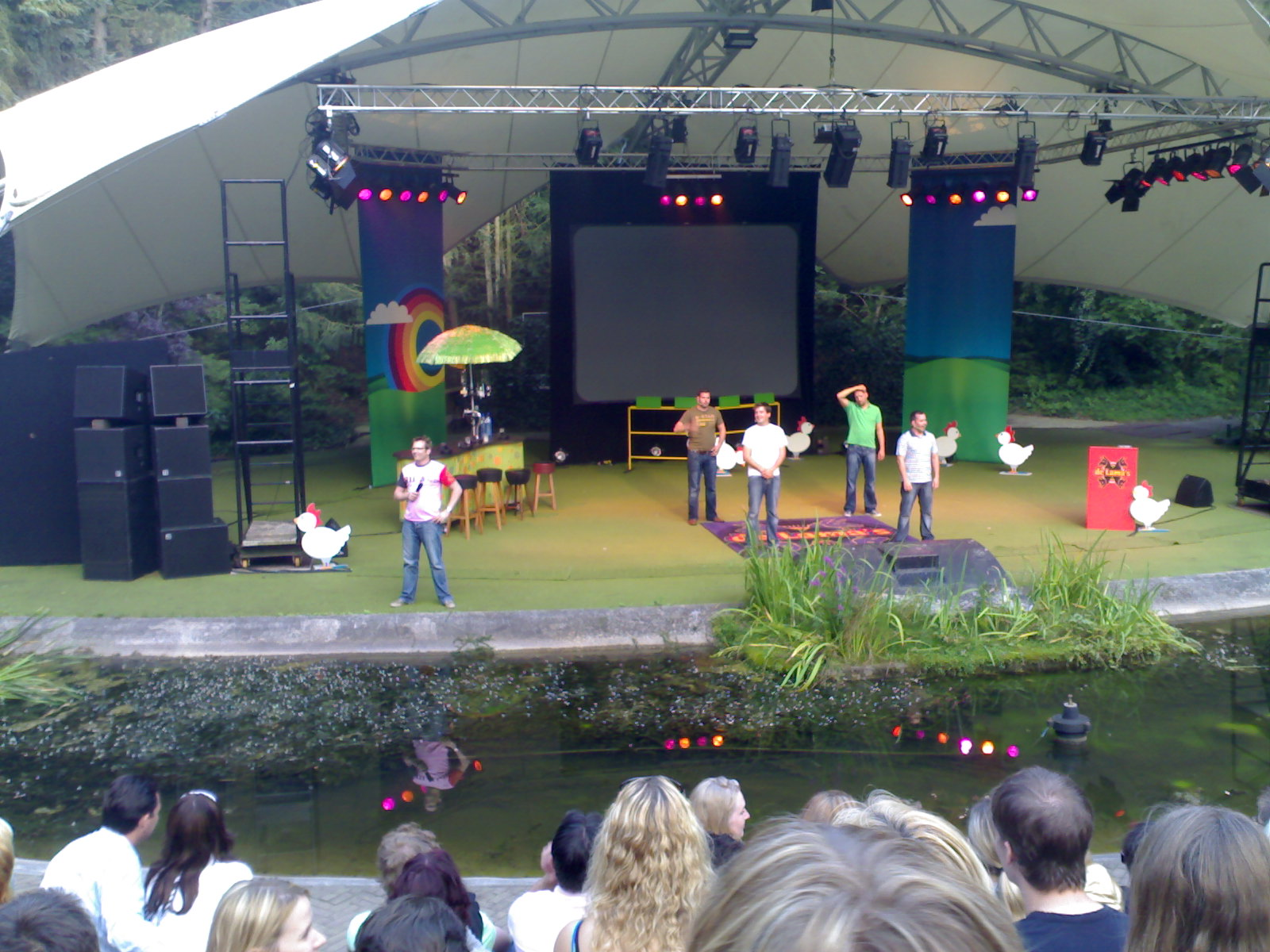
- Created by: Dan Patterson; Mark Leveson
- Starring: Patrick Lodiers; Ruben Nicolai; Ruben van der Meer; Tijl Beckand; Jeroen van Koningsbrugge; Arie Koomen; Sara Kroos
- Country of origin: Netherlands
- No. of seasons: 9
- No. of episodes: 73 (regular episodes); 85 including specials

Production
- Running time: 30 – 45 minutes

Original release
- Network: BNN; Nederland 2 (S1-4); Nederland 3 (S5-9)
- Release: 28 June 2004 – 7 November 2008

De Lama's (translation: The Llamas) is a Dutch television show created by BNN and first aired on 26 June 2004. It is an adaptation of the Channel 4 show Whose Line Is It Anyway?.

Patrick Lodiers hosts the show, which contains both well-known and more obscure elements of theatresports. The most important of these is improvisation.

De Lama's consist of the following comedians: Ruben Nicolai, Tijl Beckand, Ruben van der Meer and Jeroen van Koningsbrugge. Jandino Asporaat, Ad-Just Bouwman, Sara Kroos, Arie Koomen, Kristel Zweers and Martijn Oosterhuis are ex-Lama's. Unlike the British and American series, every episode of De Lama's features a Guest Llama (Gast Lama), a well-known Dutch (or Belgian) person who offers suggestions for games and always joins the regulars for one or two games at the end.

At the end of 2006, regulars Sara Kroos and Arie Koomen left the show (the latter later returned for a single episode), leaving it with only three regular performers. To help alleviate this problem, broadcaster BNN organised a televised competition, Lama Gezocht, in order to find a new performer to round out the team. Ad-Just Bouwman eventually won this competition, and joined the Llamas. Bouwman is no longer part of the troupe, reportedly because his artistic style didn't fit in with the other Llamas. Another recently 'llamafied' performer, Jandino Asporaat, left at around the same time to focus on his own theatre production, although rumor has it that his style clashed with the remaining three members as well. Jeroen van Koningsbrugge is the only new member to remain with the Llamas until the end.

In 2006, the show won the Gouden Televizier-ring, a prestigious Dutch television award for the year's most popular program on TV as chosen by the audience. It was the first show broadcast by BNN (founded in 1997) to win the 'ring'.

On 4 April 2008, The Lama's announced they were going to quit with the TV-show. There was going to be one more season on TV and they planned a goodbye theatre tour through The Netherlands (and Belgium).

== Original games ==
- Diashow (Slideshow)
- De dierenwinkel (The petshop)
- De doventolk (The interpreter for the hearing impaired)
- Slechtste slogans (Worst slogans)
- De laatste minuut van (The last minute of)
- Roetsjbaan (The Big Dipper)
- De gehandicaptenscène (Variant of Change Letter, in this game, one letter cannot be used)
- Eerste zin, laatste zin (First sentence, last sentence)
- Het moordspel (The murder game)
- Op en af met een woord (On and off with a word)
- Verboden te lachen (No laughing)
- De draaideur (The Revolving Door)
- De scène met de zoemer (The scene with the buzzer, much like New Choice in Drew Carey's Green Screen Show)
- De gedachtenscène (The thought scene, variant of Film Noir/Narrate where the thoughts are narrated by the person behind the performer, rather than the performers themselves)
- Wereldvisie Songfestival (Worldvision Song Contest)
- De Jabber (The Jabber)
- Wereldkampioenschap in slowmotion (World Championship in slowmotion, much like Action Replay)
- Bedscène (Bedscene)
- De specialist (the specialist)
- Interview achteruit (interview in reverse)

== Games from Whose Line Is It Anyway? ==
- Alleen vragen (Questions only)
- Datingshow
- De allerslechtste aller tijden (World's Worst)
- De persconferentie (The press conference)
- Nasynchronisatie (Dubbing)
- De Superdub (Super-dubbing)
- Papier hier (Whose line)
- De voorwerpenronde (Props)
- Ik wil graag zien (Scenes from a hat)
- Superhelden (Superheroes)

== DVDs ==
- 2004 - Het beste van de lama's (The best of The Llamas), season 1
- 2005 - De lama's spugen er op los (The Llamas spit around), seasons 2, 3 and halve of season 4
- 2006 - Verboden te lachen (Forbidden to laugh), season 5 and the other part of season 4
- 2007 - De allerslechtste aller tijden (The very worst of all times), seasons 6 and 7
- 2008 - Hoor ik daar een lama zingen (Do I hear a Llama singing), highlights of 4 years of de Lama's
- 2008 - Superhelden (Superheroes), seasons 8 and 9
- 2008 - So long, farewell, Auf Wiedersehen, Goodbye, registration of their last performance in the theatre tour
