= Jörgen Raymann =

Dutch-Surinamese comedian and presenter (born 1966)

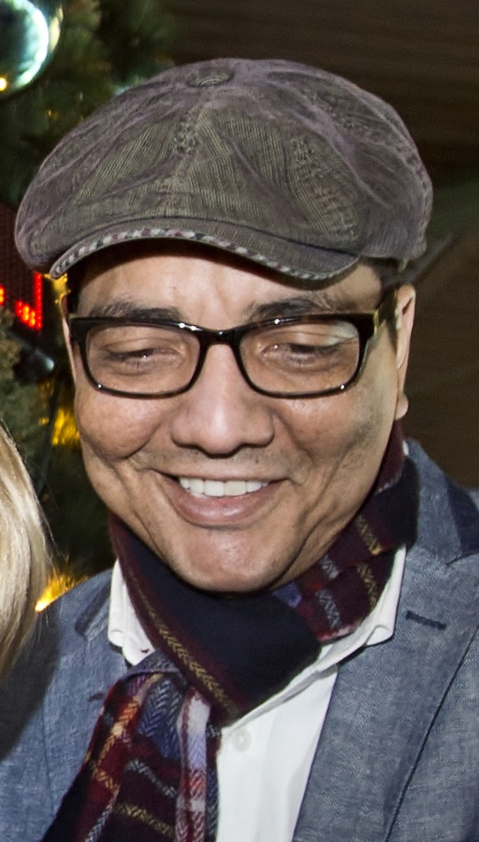
- Born: Jörgen Henri Raymann; 13 August 1966 (age 60); Amsterdam, Netherlands

Comedy career
- Medium: Stand-up, television, film
- Genre: Stand-up Comedy

Jörgen Henri Raymann (born 13 August 1966) is a Dutch-Surinamese cabaretier, stand-up comedian, actor and presenter.

In 2021, he appeared in the television game show De Verraders ('The Traitors').

Jörgen Raymann was born in Amsterdam and raised in Paramaribo. He is partly of Sephardi Jewish descent.

He stayed in a monastery for three days for a 2026 episode of the television show Kloostergasten.

== Filmography ==
List of acting performances in film and television
Year	Title	Role	Notes
2011	Amsterdam Heavy	Dr. Sunil	
