= Gwen van Poorten =

Dutch television presenter (born 1989)

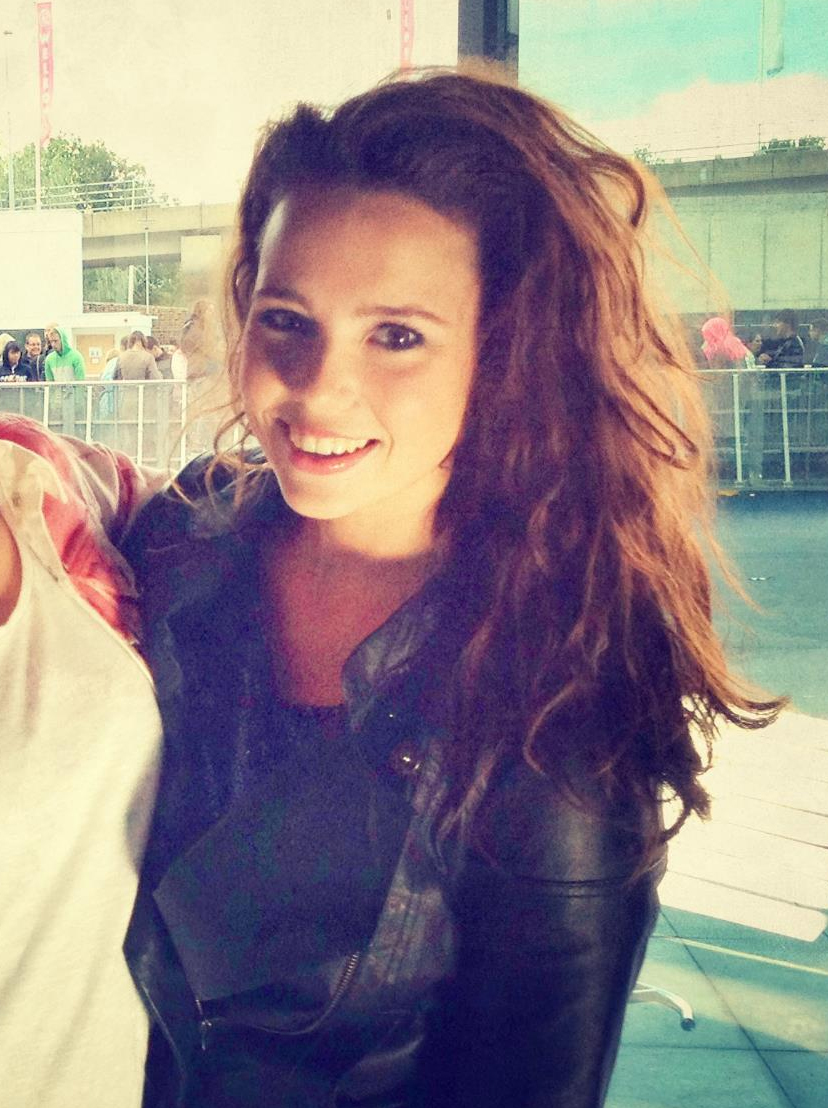
- Born: 17 November 1989 (age 36); Veghel, Netherlands
- Presenting career
- Show: Spuiten en Slikken
- Network: BNN
- Style: Video jockey
- Country: Netherlands
- Previous show: Xite
- Website: gwenvanpoorten.nl

Gwen van Poorten (Dutch pronunciation: [ˈɡʋɛɱ vɑm ˈpoːrtə(n)]; born November 17, 1989) is a Dutch presenter, working for the Dutch public broadcasting association BNN.

== Career ==
Van Poorten started her career in 2012 as VJ for Dutch television network Xite. As of 2014, she has stopped working for Xite and became a presenter for the Dutch television programs De Social Club and Spuiten en Slikken. She also appears on the 3FM radio station as a sidekick in Barend en Wijnand and sometimes copresents Dumpertreeten on the Dutch video and photo sharing site Dumpert .
