= DNA Singers =

Dutch television game show

- Presented by: Art Rooijakkers
- Country of origin: Netherlands
- Original language: Dutch
- No. of seasons: 3

Original release
- Network: RTL 4
- Release: 2023 – 2024

DNA Singers is a Dutch television game show presented by Art Rooijakkers. In each episode, relatives of multiple Dutch singers sing a song and two teams have to guess who the person is related to. In the first and second season, the team captains were Jeroen van Koningsbrugge and Jaap Reesema. Kees Tol and Roxeanne Hazes were the team captains in the third season.
