= Heleen van Royen =

Dutch novelist and columnist

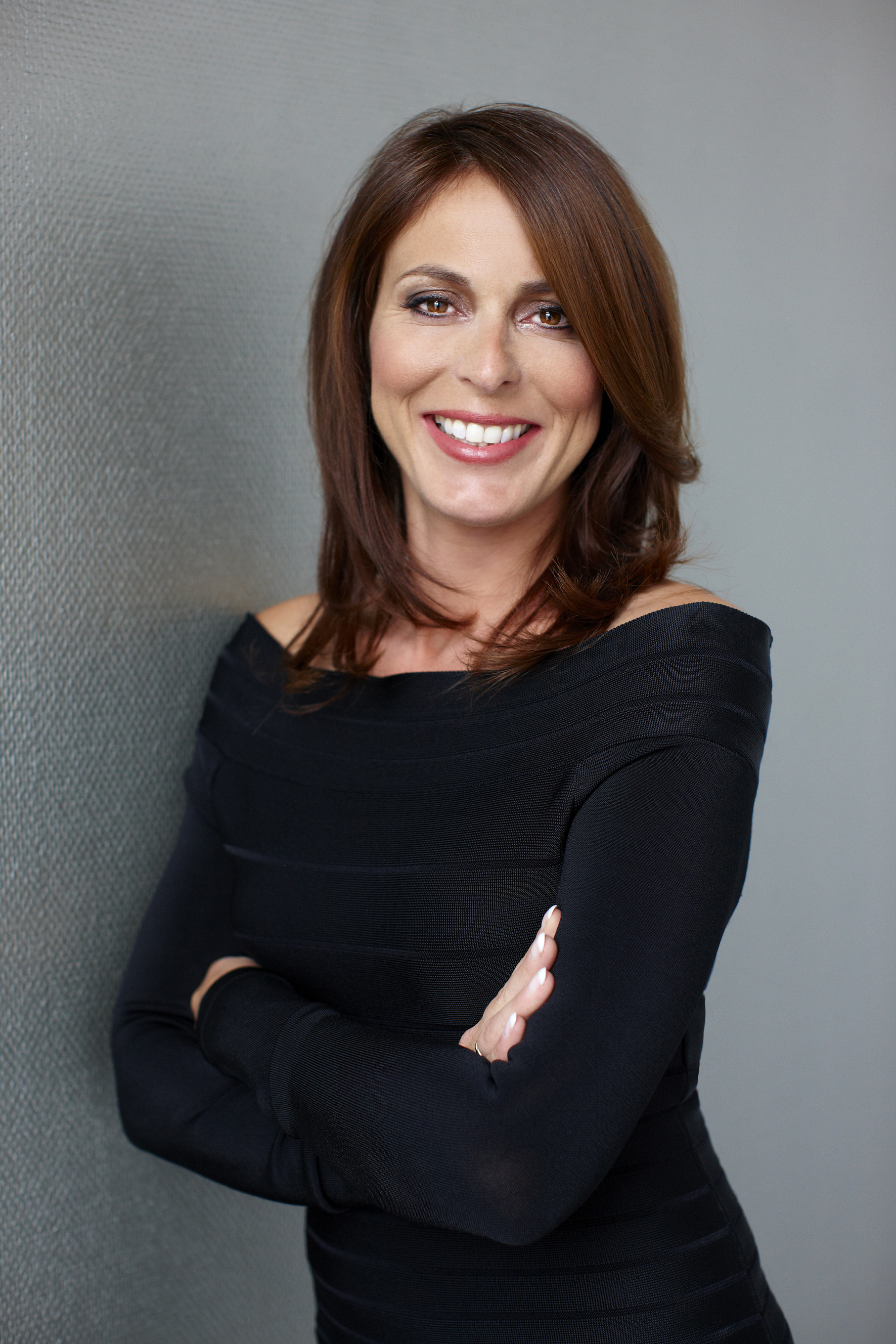
- Born: Helena Margaretha Kroon; 9 March 1965 (age 60); Amsterdam
- Occupation: Writer
- Years active: 2000-present
- Spouse: Ton van Royen (1992-2013), divorced.
- Children: 2

Heleen van Royen (born Helena Margaretha Kroon; 9 March 1965, in Amsterdam) is a Dutch novelist and columnist. Her novel De gelukkige huisvrouw ("The Happy Housewife") was the best-selling Dutch novel of 2010. The candid descriptions of sexuality (including her own) found in her books and her columns have drawn considerable attention, as have her personal revelations about sexual fantasies, even to the point of ridicule: Dorine Wiersma won the Annie M.G. Schmidt award for best theatrical song for "Stoute Heleen" ("Naughty Heleen"), a crude pastiche of van Royen's depictions of her own sexuality. Two of van Royen's novels were adapted for film, De gelukkige huisvrouw (2009, adapted for the stage in the same year), and De ontsnapping (The Escape, 2010). She has two children, daughter Olivia and son Sam. In November 2006, van Royen posed in the nude for Playboy.

In the summer of 2025, she appears in the evening edition of RTL Boulevard, titled RTL Boulevard Summernight.

== Publications ==
- De gelukkige huisvrouw, 2000
- Godin van de jacht, 2003
- De ontsnapping, 2006
- De mannentester, 2009
- De naaimachine : over moederschap, 2010
- Bloed, zweet en tranen, 2011
- Verboden vruchten, 2012
- De hartsvriendin, 2013
- Sexdagboek, 2018
