= Alles is Muziek =

2023 Dutch television show

- Presented by: Marieke Elsinga
- Starring: Jeroen van Koningsbrugge; Holly Mae Brood
- Country of origin: Netherlands
- Original language: Dutch
- No. of seasons: 1
- No. of episodes: 6

Original release
- Network: RTL 4
- Release: 8 April – 13 May 2023

Alles is Muziek (Dutch for: Everything is Music) is a 2023 Dutch television show presented by Marieke Elsinga. In the show, two teams compete by recreating songs using everyday objects. The team captains were Jeroen van Koningsbrugge and Holly Mae Brood. It was Elsinga's first television show.

The show drew disappointing viewing figures. In response to this, RTL 4 made episodes shorter and also removed the Asian comic duo act Yumbo Dump from the show. The duo creates sounds using their bodies and they appeared on seasons of America's Got Talent and Asia's Got Talent. The act received criticism for being stereotypical. The show was cancelled on 8 May 2023, a few days after the fifth episode, as a result of the disappointing viewing figures. The last episode aired on 13 May 2023.

The show was recorded in February 2023. The first episode of the show was scheduled to air on 16 March 2023 but it was postponed as more time was needed to complete production of the show.
