= Irene Moors =

Dutch singer and television presenter

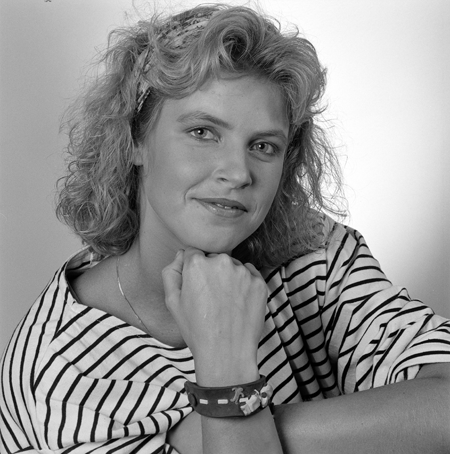
- Irene Moors in 1989
- Born: 18 June 1967 (age 58); Alkmaar, Netherlands
- Occupations: Dutch comedian, TV personality, singer, and host

Irene Moors (born 18 June 1967, Alkmaar) is a Dutch comedian, TV personality, singer, and host.

== Career ==
Her career took off in 1989 with RTL 4's Telekids, co-starring Carlo Boszhard, turning them both into TV icons of the Netherlands.

In 1995, she topped the Dutch charts for six consecutive weeks with the single No Limit by Irene Moors & de Smurfen.

Her shows include Dit is Disney, Omroepster RTL Veronique, Hitbingo, Life & Cooking, and co-starred with Carlo Boszhard on De TV Kantine for RTL 4.

In 2023, she appeared in an episode of the television game show Alles is Muziek. She won the 2025 season of the photography television show Het Perfecte Plaatje op Reis in which contestants compete to create the best photo in various challenges.

== Filmography ==
Year	Title	Network	Role	Notes
1989–1999	Telekids	RTL 4	Herself	Hostess (1989–1993), co-host (1993–1999)
2000–2009	Life & Cooking	RTL 4	Herself	Co-host
2009–present	De TV Kantine	RTL 4	Various	
2009–2015	Carlo & Irene: Life4You	RTL 4	Herself	Co-host
