= Carlo Boszhard =

Dutch television personality (born 1969)

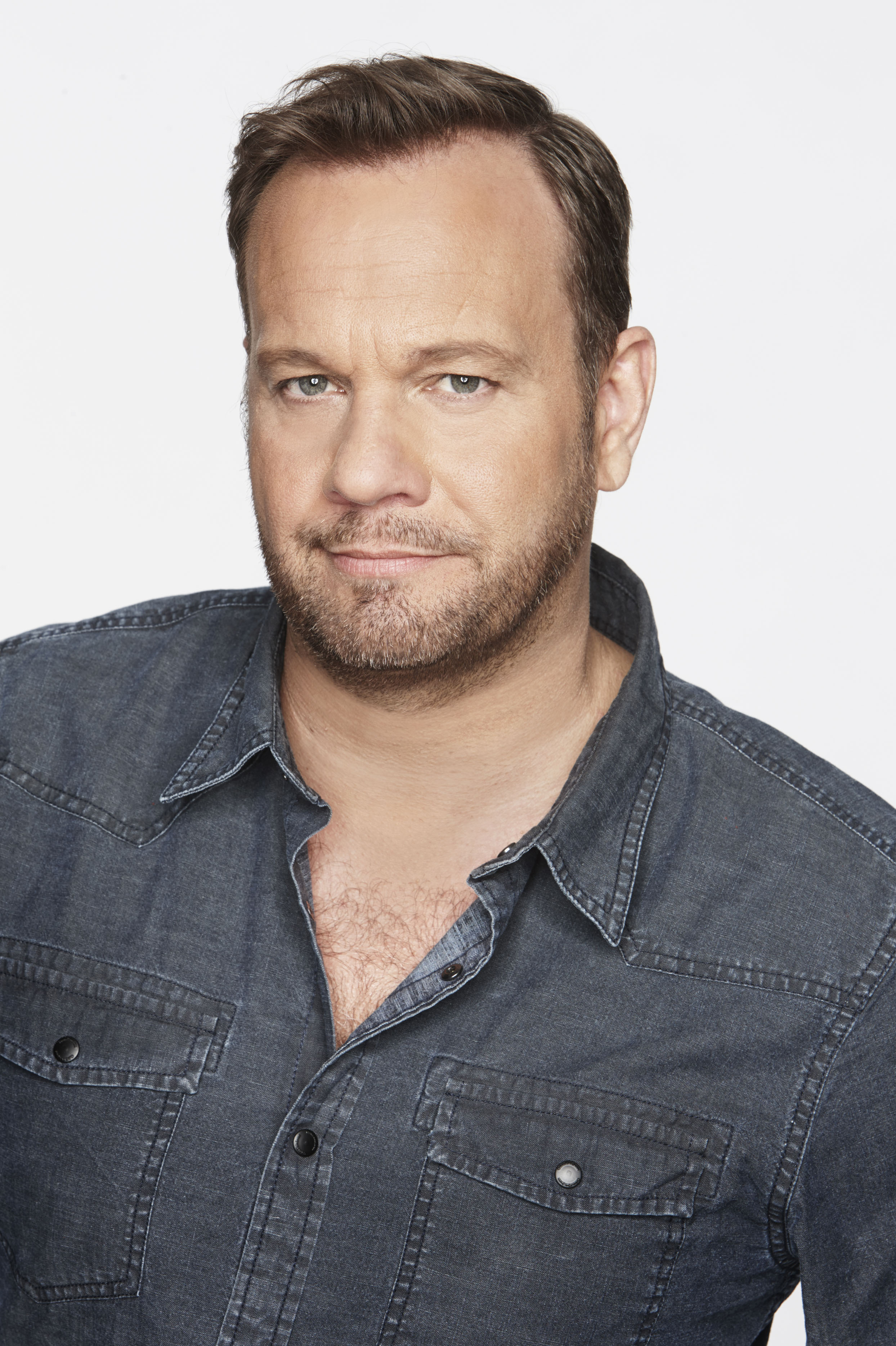
- Born: 26 June 1969 (age 56); Amsterdam, Netherlands
- Years active: 1989-present
- Career
- Show: Hitbingo; Telekids; The TV Canteen (nl)
- Country: Netherlands

Carlo Boszhard (born 26 June 1969) is a Dutch TV personality, singer, impersonator, and host. His brother is Ron Boszhard.

== Early life ==
Carlo was born as the youngest son of the Boszhard family. He is the brother of Ron Boszhard.

He spent his childhood in Amsterdam and had a predilection for theater and hamsters, show and entertainment in primary school. At the age of thirteen het started performing in theater De Engelenbak in Amsterdam. One of his teachers there was Dutch TV host Paul de Leeuw.

After completing the Agricultural and Horticultural school, he became a caretaker. He nursed elderly people suffering from dementia.

Yet, Boszhard still wanted to be a presenter. So he chose to perform as an extra in late 1980s television shows such as the Ep Oorklep Show (with André van Duin), Pisa (with Henk Spaan and Harry Vermeegen), and in the film Dutch Treat with the Dolly Dots.

In 1989 Boszhard responded to an advertisement from the AVRO and got himself hired as a host for the 1st time.

== Career ==
His career started in 1989, hosting a part of the AVRO program Pauze TV (Break TV). In 1990, he switched to RTL 4, where he would present De Gek Van De Week-Show (The Nut Of The Week-Show), which wasn't successful. In 1991, Boszhard joined Irene Moors in hosting the television program Hitbingo, but his career truly took off in 1993 with RTL 4's Telekids, co-starring Irene Moors, which made both them and the television show famous in the Netherlands.

His shows include Cash en Carlo, a Dutch adaptation of the American television game show The Price Is Right, McCarlo and Monte Carlo, both of which featured Carlo singing with guest talents, and Life en Cooking for RTL 4.

Boszhard was a voice actor for the Dutch versions of movies like Mulan, Ice Age, The Magic Voyage, Frozen and Shrek.

In 2009, Boszhard hosted the second incarnation of the Dutch Wheel of Fortune, entitled Het Rad Van Fortuin.

In the last few years, Boszhard has been working on impersonations of Dutch celebrities. He is the driving force behind the program The TV Canteen, broadcast by RTL 4. Boszhard worked on the concept of the show and developed it. In this satirical program, he impersonates famous people, together with Irene Moors. The program won the Gouden Televizier Ring, an award for outstanding TV programs on Dutch television, in October 2010.

Since 2019 Boszhard has been a jury member in the Dutch version of the program The Masked Singer.

He also is a rotating celebrity judge on Season 2 RuPaul's Drag Race Holland in 2021.

== Additional work ==
Carlo Boszhard has been an Ambassador for the Animal Aid Foundation (Stichting Dierenhulp) since 2000. During one of his broadcasts of Monte Carlo, Carlo came into contact with the initiator of this foundation. Carlo was impressed by this charity and has supported the Dutch organization ever since.

== Filmography ==
Year	Title	Network	Role	Notes
1993–1999	Telekids	RTL 4	Himself	Co-host
2000–2009	Life & Cooking	RTL 4	Himself	Co-host
2009–present	The TV Canteen	RTL 4	Various	
2009–2015	Carlo & Irene: Life4You	RTL 4	Himself	Co-host
2018–2019	Een goed stel hersens	RTL 4	Himself	Co-host
2020	I Can See Your Voice	RTL 4	Himself	Host
2025-present	The Floor	RTL 4	Himself	Host

== Theatre ==
- 2001/2003 - Saturday Night Fever as DJ Monty
- 2006-2007 - Beauty and the Beast as Lumiere
- 2008-2009 - Les Misérables as Thénardier
- 2024-present - Moulin Rouge! as Harold Zidler
