= Olcay Gulsen =

Dutch fashion designer (born 1980)

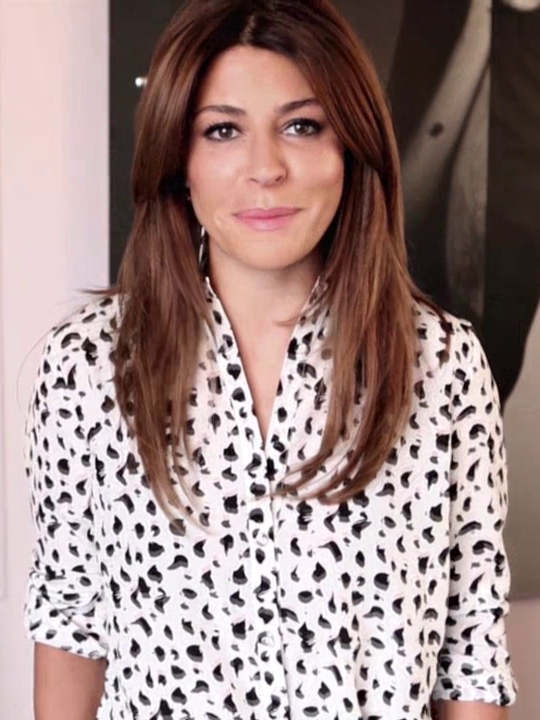
- Olcay Gulsen in 2014
- Born: 20 July 1980 (age 45); Waalwijk, Netherlands
- Occupations: Fashion designer, presenter

Olcay Gülşen, also known as OJ Gulsen, (born 20 July 1980) is a Dutch fashion designer. She was the owner of fashion label "SuperTrash" from 2009 to 2018.

== Life and career ==
Olcay Gulsen's parents are Kurdish born in Turkey. Gulsen was born in Waalwijk. She has four sisters (Dolshe, Georgina, Venus and Jasmin) and a brother (Gökhan). In 2002, Gulsen graduated from her Human Resource course. After graduation she moved to Amsterdam to start her first company, an HRM agency called Chill Agency, at the age of 21. She went on to start her second company named 2Stepzahead, importing international fashion brands. This gave her the opportunity to take on her third and biggest project to date: a fashion brand named SuperTrash. By 2010, SuperTrash was sold in more than 2,000 sales points in 24 countries in Europe and America. In February 2018 Gulsen left SuperTrash. Four weeks later the company filed for bankruptcy leaving behind €11,000,000 of debt.

== Awards ==
- 2008: Jackie Magazine – Fashion Entrepreneur of the Year
- 2010: Amsterdam Business Award
- 2010: Marie Claire Prix de la Mode – Best Fashion Entrepreneur of 2010

== Collaborations ==
- 2009: Gulsen becomes the face of the new Philips Senseo coffee maker
- 2010: SuperTrash creates a Special Edition Dutch Dress for Bavaria
- 2010: Gulsen becomes the face of Samsung
- 2012: SuperTrash creates a European Championship dress for Albert Heijn
- 2013: SuperTrash creates a dress to celebrate the 25th anniversary of Disneyland Paris
- 2013: Gulsen becomes ambassador for the first Global Kids Fashion Week in London
- 2013: Gulsen becomes ambassador for international non-profit foundation Challenge Day

== Television appearances ==
- 2009: Holland's Next Top Model: guest jury member
- 2010: Project Catwalk (The Netherlands): guest jury member
- 2010: De Wereld Draait Door: regular guest
- 2011: Project Catwalk (The Netherlands): main jury member
- 2012: The Face (The Netherlands): main mentor
- 2013: The Daily Buzz: Gulsen has her own fashion segment on the US show
- 2018: Wie is de Mol?: contestant

== SuperTrash ==
The SuperTrash brand specializes in dresses, tops and pants. A shoe line was added to the collection in 2009, featuring primarily high-heeled shoes supplemented by glamorous flats. Later that year a denim collection named STenim was launched. In 2010, five brand stores were opened in The Netherlands (in Utrecht, The Hague, Laren, Maastricht and Eindhoven), one in Ibiza and several shop-in-shops. Additionally, brand stores in Amsterdam and Rotterdam opened in 2011. In 2012 the label expanded internationally, opening up a store and Headquarters on London's Carnaby Street and New York's Prince Street (permanently closed). In total there are now 15 brand stores internationally, including Antwerp, Gent and Wijnegem in Belgium. The brand also introduced its new label ST. Girls in 2012 to fashionably dress 6- to 16-year-olds. SuperTrash has also launched its own fragrance, Phenomenal and a range of nail polishes. In 2013 SuperTrash has evolved into a lifestyle brand instead of primarily a fashion label.

== Personal ==
Olcay Gulsen lives in Amsterdam and London. She was engaged to footballer Edgar Davids in 2006 but they split in 2012. In 2019 she started a relationship with radio deejay Ruud de Wild. The couple separated in 2023.
