= Het Jachtseizoen =

Dutch online and television series

- Created by: Giel de Winter; Thomas van der Vlugt; Stefan Jurriens
- Directed by: Jeroen Smolders
- Starring: Giel de Winter; Thomas van der Vlugt; Stefan Jurriens
- Narrated by: Daniël Lippens (2016−present); Tom van Kessel (Videoland, 2024−present)
- Opening theme: "Break Ends" (Isaac Larson)
- Country of origin: Netherlands
- Original language: Dutch
- No. of seasons: 9 (YouTube); 4 (SBS6); 3 (Videoland)

Production
- Producers: Ennia Wingens; Lisanne de Zee; Lieke Rours; Daniel den Boogert
- Editors: Tommy Lee; Wietse de Zwart; Jeroen Smolders
- Running time: 20−30 minutes (Youtube); 40−45 minutes (SBS6); 40−60 minutes (Videoland)

Original release
- Network: YouTube
- Release: 17 December 2016 – present
- Network: SBS6
- Release: 11 September 2021 – 27 June 2024
- Network: Videoland
- Release: 19 October 2024 – present

Het Jachtseizoen ("The Hunting Season") is a Dutch series by StukTV, where a celebrity (or a duo of celebrities) is on the run from Team-Stuk (consisting of StukTV presenters Giel de Winter, Thomas van der Vlugt and Stefan Jurriens). Their goal is to not be captured for the duration of the game (originally four hours).

The programme started out as a series on StukTV's YouTube channel in 2016. For this channel, they released nine seasons as of October 2026. From 2021 until 2024, four seasons were made to air on SBS6. Since 2024, a spin-off, titled Het Jachtseizoen: Most Wanted, is produced to stream exclusively on Videoland.

== YouTube series ==
From 2016 until 2023, every year a season was filmed for release on YouTube. Episodes were uploaded in the fall or winter, weekly on Saturdays at 17:00. The first three seasons were co-produced by StukTV and RTL. The first season was also made available to stream on RTL XL. The third and fourth season also aired on Veronica.

=== Rules ===
A typical game has a duration of 4 hours. For the last season, each contestant was given the choice to play the classic version, or the hardcore version, where the total time is 2 hours (with also cutting in half all times in the rules below).

The contestant...

- wears an orange overall and a gps-tracker.
- gets a 20-minute head start from Team-Stuk.
- is not allowed to take their own phone or money with them.
- is allowed to arrange one or two escape vehicles beforehand (amount varies per season).
- is not allowed to use the same vehicle for more than 20 minutes (10 minutes for the last hour).
- cannot enter buildings (except for public spaces such as train stations or shopping malls).
- gets to see their distance from Team-Stuk after each full hour has passed (season 2–present).
- has the option to push an "offline button". With this button, all of Team-Stuk's equipment gets shut down for 10 minutes (season 3–present).

Team-Stuk...

- gets to see the contestants's location every 10 minutes, also during their 20-minute head start. From season 2 onwards, in the final hour, their location is visible every 5 minutes.
- has access to a van, phones, tablets and a drone. With their equipment, they navigate their way to capture someone, or they often call a location where they suspect the contestant to be at the time.

=== Season 1 (2016–2017) ===
The first season premiered on 17 December 2016 and consisted of 8 episodes.

Episode	Release date	Contestant(s)	Starting location	Ending location	Result
1	17 December 2016	Ronnie Flex	Gravensteen, Zierikzee	Goes	Caught after 1:30:20
2	24 December 2016	Dylan Haegens	De Baaies, Makkum	Leeuwarden	Escaped (5 km away)
3	31 December 2016	Boef	Oostereiland, Hoorn	Zwaagdijk	Caught after 2:08:09
4	7 January 2017	JayJay Boske	Schutterswei, Alkmaar	Amsterdam	Caught after 2:05:35
5	14 January 2017	Rapper Sjors	Kasteel Hoensbroek, Hoensbroek	Heerlen	Caught after 1:09:03
6	21 January 2017	Humberto Tan	DeFabrique, Utrecht	Vaassen	Escaped (6 km away)
7	28 January 2017	Tim Hofman	Koepelgevangenis, Breda	's-Hertogenbosch	Caught after 2:27:08
8	4 February 2017	Parents (Note: For the season finale, hosts Giel, Thomas and Stefan challenged their parents to escape.)	Slot Loevestein, Poederoijen	Utrecht	Caught after 1:49:12

=== Season 2 (2017) ===
The second season premiered on 16 September 2017 and consisted of 11 episodes.

Earlier in 2017, a Jachtseizoen app was released, where people could play the game themselves, choosing who is chasing and running. Players can also choose the duration of the game.

From this season onwards, the contestant's location is sent to Team-Stuk every five minutes in the final hour. Additionally, from this season onwards, the contestant is able to see their distance to Team-Stuk at every hour.

Episode	Release date (2017)	Contestant	Starting location	Ending location	Result
1	16 September	Jonna Fraser	Wolvenburg, Utrecht	Koog aan de Zaan	Caught after 1:20:57
2	23 September	Nikkie de Jager	Schutterswei, Alkmaar	Uitgeest	Caught after 3:32:15
3	30 September	Jebroer	Koepelgevangenis, Arnhem	Lexmond	Caught after 3:22:36
4	7 October	Wolter Kroes	Fort 1881, Hoek van Holland	Vlaardingen	Escaped (4 km away)
5	14 October	Kwebbelkop	Blokhuispoort, Leeuwarden	Wartena	Caught after 1:33:08
6	21 October	Tony Junior	Fort bij Abcoude, Abcoude	Heerenveen	Escaped (2 km away)
7	28 October	Shelly Sterk	Bijlmerbajes, Amsterdam	's-Hertogenbosch	Caught after 2:50:18
8	4 November	Fred van Leer	Fort Honswijk, Schalkwijk	Noordwijk	Escaped (5 m away)
9	11 November	John van den Heuvel	DeFabrique, Utrecht	Midwoud	Caught after 3h26m
10	18 November	Ali B	Delft City Hall, Delft	Almere	Caught after 3h32m
11	25 November	Timin (Note: Timin was that year's best player on the Jachtseizoen app, so he was challenged by Team-Stuk for the season finale.)	Fort bij Vechten, Bunnik	Deventer	Caught after 3:03:40

=== Season 3 (2018) ===
The third season premiered on 21 October 2018 and consisted of 10 episodes.

From this season onwards, the "offline button" was added as an extra feature for the contestant. They can (but do not have to) press this button once, at any point during the game. When pushed, all of Team-Stuk's equipment is shut down for 10 minutes.

Episode	Release date (2018)	Contestant	Starting location	Ending location	Result
1	21 October	Kalvijn	Schutterswei, Alkmaar	Afsluitdijk	Caught after 1:23:32
2	27 October	Rico Verhoeven	Fort de Hel, Willemstad	Halsteren	Escaped (1 km away)
3	3 November	Famke Louise	Blokhuispoort, Leeuwarden	Groningen	Caught after 3:43:21
4	10 November	Bizzey	Fort Everdingen, Everdingen	Nieuwegein	Caught after 3:48:19
5	17 November	Maan	Fort benoorden Spaarndam, Spaarndam	Vianen	Escaped (4 km away)
6	24 November	Qucee	De Rode Pannen, Veenhuizen	Heerenveen	Caught after 3:33:02
7	1 December	Anna Nooshin	PI Wolvenplein, Utrecht	Breda	Caught after 2:02:47
8	8 December	Frenna	Fort Oranje, Heijningen	The Hague	Escaped (0.9 km away)
9	15 December	Monica Geuze	Bijlmerbajes, Amsterdam	Amsterdam	Caught after 3:30:59
10	16 December	Boef (Note: Team-Stuk sent out a poll in their app, asking which contestant from season 1 or 2 deserves a rematch. Boef won the vote.)	Fort Pannerden, Doornenburg	Almere	Escaped (0.6 km away)

=== Season 4 (2019) ===
The fourth season premiered on 20 October 2019 and consisted of 10 episodes.

A special episode, featuring Churandy Martina, was filmed on Curaçao and is not part of the regular season. The gameplay was adjusted, thereby the total time was two hours instead of four. Additionally, the offline button was not featured. Team-Stuk member Stefan Jurriens was not present.

Episode	Release date (2019)	Contestant	Starting location	Ending location	Result
1	20 October	Bram Krikke	Koepelgevangenis, Arnhem	Hilversum	Escaped (0.2 km away)
2	26 October	Hardwell	PI Wolvenplein, Utrecht	Bavel	Escaped (9 km away)
3	2 November	OnneDi	PI Veenhuizen, Veenhuizen	Zwolle	Caught after 1:30:27
4	9 November	Marco Borsato	PI Wolvenplein, Utrecht	Wijk aan Zee	Escaped (5 m away)
5	16 November	Poke	Fort Pannerden, Doornenburg	Tiel	Caught after 1:51:21
6	23 November	Soufiane Touzani	Twente Airport, Enschede	Den Dolder	Escaped (7.5 km away)
7	30 November	Sylvana IJsselmuiden	Fort Sabina Henrica, Heijningen	Nieuwerkerk a/d IJssel	Caught after 1:27:42
8	7 December	Snelle	Fort Maarsseveen, Maarssen	Hardinxveld-Giessendam	Escpaped (0.3 km away)
9	14 December	Nienke Plas	Generaal De Bonskazerne, Grave	Belfeld	Escaped (5 km away)
10	15 December	Klaas-Jan Huntelaar	Fort aan den Ham (Note: Incorrectly indicated as Grave at the start of the episode, but correctly stated as Uitgeest by the voice over.), Uitgeest	Zaandam	Escaped (11 km away)
—N/a	25 December	Churandy Martina	Kontiki Beach Resort, Willemstad	North Coast, Curaçao	Escaped (9 km away)

=== Season 5 (2020–2021) ===
The fifth season premiered on 31 October 2020 and consisted of 10 episodes.

A week after the season finale, StukTV released a documentary, showing behind the scenes footage of how a season is produced. They also answered questions that were asked by viewers. This documentary also featured footage of fans using the Jachtseizoen app all throughout the Netherlands.

Episode	Release date	Contestant	Starting location	Ending location	Result
1	31 October 2020	Enzo Knol	Fort Maarsseveen, Maarssen	Marknesse	Escaped (20 m away)
2	7 November 2020	Jandino Asporaat	Bunkercomplex Overvoorde, Rijswijk	Vught	Caught after 3:57:47
3	14 November 2020	Lil' Kleine	Koepelgevangenis, Breda	Diemen	Disqualified (Note: After lots of comments on YouTube calling out Lil' Kleine for cheating, StukTV announced on social media that he would be disqualified, just a few hours after the video was uploaded. Lil' Kleine instructed more than two people beforehand, he and his friends committed multiple traffic violations, he used the same vehicle for more than 20 minutes, and drugs were used. His disqualification was first shown on the scoreboard in the following episode.)
4	21 November 2020	Emma Heesters	De Rode Pannen, Veenhuizen	Urk	Caught after 2:20:23
5	28 November 2020	Bilal Wahib	Pieter Baan Centre, Utrecht	Amsterdam	Caught after 2:04:22
6	5 December 2020	Gaby Blaaser	Koepelgevangenis, Arnhem	Wassenaar	Caught after 3:29:07
7	12 December 2020	Milan Knol	PI Wolvenplein, Utrecht	Amersfoort	Caught after 3:17:44
8	19 December 2020	Dopebwoy	PI Limburg Zuid, Maastricht	Almere	Caught after 3:31:42
9	26 December 2020	Ruben Nicolai	Kasteel van Woerden, Woerden	Rotterdam	Caught after 2:59:33
10	2 January 2021	Jamal Ben Saddik	Fort Altena, Werkendam	Dordrecht	Escaped (by knockout) (Note: Team-Stuk left their van behind unattended. Ben Saddik managed to take it and drive away. His victory was listed as a technical knockout.)

=== Documentary (2021) ===
To celebrate five seasons of Het Jachtseizoen, StukTV released a documentary, showing behind the scenes footage of how the fifth season was produced. They also answered questions that were asked by viewers. This documentary also featured footage of fans using the Jachtseizoen app all throughout the Netherlands. It was released a week after the fifth season's finale, on 9 January 2021.

=== Season 6 (2021–2022) ===
The sixth season premiered on 13 November 2021 and consisted of 10 episodes.

Episode	Release date	Contestant(s)	Starting location	Ending location	Result
1	13 November 2021	Martin Garrix	Fort bij Nigtevecht, Nigtevecht	Texel	Caught after 3:54:50
2	20 November 2021	Eloise van Oranje	Fort bij Spijkerboor, Westbeemster	Oude Wetering	Caught after 2:39:38
3	27 November 2021	Kraantje Pappie	De Rode Pannen, Veenhuizen	Hooghalen	Escaped (2 m away)
4	4 December 2021	Frank Lammers	PI Almere, Almere	Winkel	Escaped (5 km away)
5	11 December 2021	Kees van der Spek	Fort Wierickerschans, Bodegraven	Westpoort	Escaped (6 km away)
6	18 December 2021	Romee Strijd	Fort 1881, Hoek van Holland	Amsterdam	Caught after 3:20:04
7	25 December 2021	Défano Holwijn	De Kruisberg, Doetinchem	Driebergen-Rijsenburg	Caught after 3:11:10
8	1 January 2022	Dennis Schouten	Kasteel van Woerden, Woerden	Gouda	Caught after 1:36:55
9	8 January 2022	Mart Hoogkamer	Fort Vuren, Vuren	Leiden	Escaped (10 m away)
10	15 January 2022	Bankzitters (Note: This team consisted of Bankzitters members Koen van Heest, Raoul de Graaf and Matthyas het Lam.)	PI Wolvenplein, Utrecht	Lelystad	Caught after 1:51:49

=== Season 7 (2022) ===
The seventh season premiered on 5 November 2022 and consisted of 8 episodes.

The final episode featured Dylan Haegens, who previously participated in the first season. He was challenged by Team-Stuk, this time trying out a "hardcore" version of the game, where most of the rules are halved. The total duration was two hours, he got a ten-minute head start, his location was visible every 5 minutes, the offline button lasted 5 minutes, he could see the distance to Team-Stuk every half hour, and he was able to use the same vehicle for only 10 minutes.

Episode	Release date (2022)	Contestant	Starting location	Ending location	Result
1	5 November	Antoon	PI Almere, Almere	Houtribdijk	Escaped (11 km away)
2	12 November	Khalid Alterch	Fort bij Spijkerboor, Westbeemster	Rotterdam	Escaped (1.8 km away)
3	19 November	Gio Latooy	Fort 1881, Hoek van Holland	Roelofarendsveen	Caught after 2:57:31
4	26 November	La Fuente	Fort Sabina Henrica, Heijningen	Eindhoven	Caught after 3:19:28
5	3 December	Frans Duijts	Koepelgevangenis, Arnhem	Volendam	Caught after 3:12:07
6	10 December	Froukje Veenstra	Fort Wierickerschans, Bodegraven	Leiden	Caught after 2:24:56
7	17 December	Mehdi Chafi (Sjaak)	De Rode Pannen, Veenhuizen	Akkrum	Caught after 2:41:42
8	24 December	Dylan Haegens (Note: Haegens participated in the first season, but was challenged by StukTV again, only this time the gameplay was adjusted. They tried out a "hardcore" version of the game. The total time was 2 hours instead of 4, his location was visible every 5 minutes instead of 10, he was able to see his distance from Team-Stuk every half our instead of every hour.)	Kasteel Keverberg, Kessel	Helenaveen	Escaped (8.5 km away)

=== Season 8 (2023–2024) ===
New this season was that each contestant was given the choice to either play the classic version or the "hardcore" version (tried out by Dylan Haegens in the finale of the previous season, where most of the rules and times are halved).

Episode	Release date	Contestant(s)	Gameplay	Starting location	Ending location	Result
1	18 November 2023	Bankzitters (Note: This team consisted of Bankzitters members Robbie van de Graaf and Milo ter Reegen.)	Classic	Heijsehaven, Rotterdam	Utrecht	Caught after 3:31:20
2	25 November 2023	Mocro Maffia (Note: This team consisted of Mocro Maffia actors Iliass Ojja and Bilal Wahib.)	Hardcore	Heliport, Harskamp	Bunnik	Escaped (4 km away)
3	2 December 2023	Armin van Buuren	Classic	De Bilt	Roelofarendsveen	Escaped (7 km away)
4	9 December 2023	Yvon Jaspers	Classic	Nieuwe Haven, Den Helder	Kampen	Caught after 03:41:54
5	16 December 2023	Pieter Valley	Hardcore	Container terminal, Moerdijk	Zoeterwoude	Escaped (10 m away)
6	23 December 2023	Daan Boom; Tobias Camman	Hardcore	Lorentzhaven, Harderwijk	Zwolle	Caught after 01:06:43
7	30 December 2023	Dutch Performante	Classic	Parking lot, Deventer	Zeewolde	Caught after 03:22:50
8	6 January 2024	Robbert Rodenburg	Hardcore	Heliport, Harskamp	Huizen	Escaped (3 km away)

=== Season 9 (2026) ===
In September 2026, StukTV announced that Team-Stuk member Giel would be on the run from Thomas and Stefan, in a new episode to be released on YouTube. Later, they announced each of the three Team-Stuk members would take turns being on the run from each other. Daniël Lippens returned as voice over after his absence from the Most Wanted spin-off series.

Episode	Release date	Contestant	Starting location	Ending location	Result
1	30 September 2026	Giel de Winter	Fort Wierickerschans, Bodegraven	Huissen	Escaped (2 km away)
2	7 October 2026	Thomas van der Vlugt	Fort Altena, Werkendam	Boxtel	Caught after 03:48:29
3	14 October 2026	Stefan Jurriens	Fort bij Abcoude, Abcoude	Heemskerk	Escaped (1.4 km away)

== Television series ==
In November 2020, StukTV announced they would produce Het Jachtseizoen for SBS6. In the week following the broadcast, episodes were available to stream on KIJK.nl and Amazon Prime Video. The rules of the television episodes are the same as the series on YouTube, except for the contestant always being a duo, and them not having the option to play the "hardcore" version. Additionally, the losing team had to complete a challenge (for example sitting in an ice bath, or washing the winner's cars).

The television series was renewed for a second season, which aired in 2022. A third season aired in 2023. A fourth (and final) season was announced in December 2023, to air in 2024.

=== Season 1 (2021) ===
Episode	Air date (2021)	Contestants	Starting location	Result
1	11 September	Simon Keizer; Britt Dekker	Fort bij IJmuiden, IJmuiden	Caught after 3:01:12
2	18 September	Katja Schuurman; Babette van Veen	Werk bij Maarsseveen, Maarssen	Escaped (0.5 km away)
3	25 September	Herman den Blijker; Bram Krikke (Note: Bram Krikke previously participated in the fourth season of the YouTube series in 2019.)	PI Wolvenplein, Utrecht	Caught after 3:05:43
4	2 October	Najib Amhali; Wendy van Dijk	Fort bij Spijkerboor, Westbeemster	Escaped (1 km away)
5	9 October	Dave Roelvink; Donny Roelvink	Fort bij Uithoorn, Amstelhoek	Caught after 3:01:04
6	23 October	Rolf Sanchez; Wesley Sneijder	Pieter Baan Centre, Utrecht	Escaped (2 m away)
7	30 October	Leo Alkemade; Xander de Buisonjé	PI Almere, Almere	Caught after 3:54:36
8	6 November	Ellie Lust; Nick Schilder	Koepelgevangenis, Breda	Caught after 2:17:57

=== Season 2 (2022) ===
Episode	Air date (2022)	Contestants	Starting location	Result
1	4 June	Ruud de Wild; Olcay Gulsen	Fort bij Spijkerboor, Westbeemster	Escaped (1 km away)
2	11 June	Peter P.J. Gillis; Rob Geus	Fort bij Giessen, Giessen	Escaped (40 km away)
3	18 June	Maxime Meiland; Montana Meiland	De Kruisberg, Doetinchem	Caught after 3:49:49
4	25 June	Davy Klaassen; Daley Blind	Fort aan de St. Aagtendijk, Beverwijk	Escaped (6 km away)
5	2 July	Sander Lantinga; Jan Versteegh	Fort bij Uithoorn, Amstelhoek	Caught after 2:15:22
6	9 July	Gert Verhulst; Viktor Verhulst	Fort Prins Frederik, Ooltgensplaat	Caught after 2:41:45
7	16 July	Hélène Hendriks; Anouk Hoogendijk	Vrouwengevangenis, Breda	Escaped (1 km away)
8	23 July	Kjeld Nuis; Ireen Wüst	Fort Kijkduin, Huisduinen	Escaped (2 km away)

=== Season 3 (2023) ===
Episode	Air date (2023)	Contestants	Starting location	Result
1	29 April	Yolanthe Cabau; Monica Geuze (Note: Monica Geuze previously participated in the third season of the YouTube series in 2018.)	Twente Airport, Twente	Escaped
2	6 May	Geraldine Kemper; Art Rooijakkers	Koepelgevangenis, Arnhem	Escaped
3	20 May	Edsilia Rombley; Kees Tol	DeFabrique, Utrecht	Caught after 3:35:04
4	27 May	Wietze de Jager; Klaas van der Eerden	Fort bij Vechten, Bunnik	Caught after 3:36:58
5	3 June	Jaimie Vaes; Estelle Cruijff	Fort bij Uithoorn, Amstelhoek	Escaped
6	10 June	Donnie; Mart Hoogkamer (Note: Mart Hoogkamer previously participated in the sixth season of the YouTube series in 2021.)	Radio Kootwijk, Apeldoorn	Escaped
7	17 June	Flemming; Ronnie Flex (Note: Ronnie Flex previously participated in the first season of the YouTube series in 2016.)	Fort bij Giessen, Giessen	Caught after 2:53:23
8	24 June	Gerard Ekdom; Snelle (Note: Snelle previously participated in the fourth season of the YouTube series in 2019.)	De Kruisberg, Doetinchem	Caught after 2:14:11

=== Season 4 (2024) ===
Episode	Air date (2024)	Contestants	Starting location	Result
1	25 April	Ferry Doedens; Sylvia Geersen	Port of Rotterdam	Escaped
2	2 May	Tim Coronel; Tom Coronel	TT Circuit Assen	Escaped
3	16 May	Frank de Boer; Ronald de Boer	Johan Cruyff ArenA, Amsterdam	Escaped
4	23 May	Bridget Maasland; Clarice Stenger	Fort aan de Middenweg, Zuidoostbeemster	Caught after 2:21:14
5	30 May	Merel Ek; Noa Vahle	Twente Airport, Twente	Escaped
6	6 June	Rutger Castricum; Lilian Marijnissen	Kassen van Westland, Naaldwijk	Caught after 2:10:14
7	13 June	John de Bever; Wolter Kroes (Note: Wolter Kroes previously participated in the second season of the YouTube series in 2017.)	Paper factory Gelderland, Nijmegen	Escaped
8	20 June	Dafne Schippers; Gregory Sedoc	Fort bij Giessen, Giessen	Caught after 2:18:37
—N/a	27 June	Team-Stuk (Note: For a special episode, titled "Het Vluchtseizoen", Team-Stuk members Giel, Thomas and Stefan were on the run from Tim Coronel, Tom Coronel and Rob Kamphues.)	Rietlandpark, Amsterdam	Escaped

== Het Jachtseizoen: Most Wanted ==
In 2024, StukTV announced that they were set to produce new formats to stream exclusively on Videoland, along with the announcement of a spin-off series of Het Jachtseizoen, subtitled "Most Wanted".

=== Rules ===
The gameplay differs significantly from the original format. Instead of one contestant or team being on the run, multiple 'units' (a single contestant or a duo) are on the run from Team-Stuk at the same time. General rules remain the same (the units not being allowed to use their own phone or money and having to wear an orange overall).

The units...

- are on the run for 5 days (seasons 1 and 3) or 6 days (season 2) between 10:00 and 19:00 and for a maximum of four hours on the last day (the finale). From season 3 onwards, Team-Stuk is able to extend the evening curfew by a total of 5 hours. Every morning, all units must continue their escape from the same location they ended at on the previous day.
- have to arrange accommodation themselves.
- get a one-hour head start on the first day.
- are not allowed to use the same vehicle for more than 40 minutes.
- do not have their own offline button. At certain moments throughout the week, a stationary offline button is activated somewhere in the Netherlands. All units get to see the location, as does Team-Stuk. Whichever unit reaches the location first, is digitally invisible for Team-Stuk for 2 hours (season 1), 4 hours (season 2) or 1 hour (season 3). Multiple offline buttons can be activated each season.
- get to see their distance to Team-Stuk at the end of each day.
- get a notification when another unit is caught.

Team-Stuk...

- gets to see each unit's location every 20 minutes between 10:00 and 19:00.
- continues their hunt every morning starting from the same location they ended at on the previous day at 19:00.
- only gets to see unit numbers at the start, without the names of the contestants. Eventually, with the help of people calling or texting them, they find out who is part of each unit.
- is reachable, in real time during filming, by calling 085-333 22 12. People spotting units can call this number to help Team-Stuk. This number is printed onto the unit's orange overall. People can also message StukTV on social media if they spot any of the units somewhere.
- can split up if they wish to do so.

The finale on the last day follows exactly the same rules as the original Jachtseizoen format with a total time of 4 hours. The remaining units continue as a team. Team-Stuk wins only if all remaining contestants are captured.

=== Season 1 (2024) ===
The first season, consisting of eight episodes, had a two-episode premiere on 19 October 2024. The finale was released on 30 November 2024. The contestants (15 total, 5 duo's and 5 single contestants) were revealed on 7 October.

Ranking	Contestant(s)	Result	Last seen in	Ending location	Starting location
1	Rhodé Kok	Escaped	Episode 8	Rotterdam	PI Wolvenplein, Utrecht
1	Sam Hofman; Rijk Hofman	Escaped	Episode 8	Rotterdam	PI Wolvenplein, Utrecht
2	Els & Mike	Eliminated (Note: Extraction to reach the finale was available for a maximum of two units. Thereby, remaining units were eliminated.) (day 4 at 14:00)	Episode 7	Bruinisse	PI Wolvenplein, Utrecht
3	Bizzey (Note: Bizzey previously participated in the third season of the YouTube series in 2018.); JayJay Boske (Note: JayJay Boske previously participated in the first season of the YouTube series in 2016.)	Caught (day 4 at 11:30)	Episode 6	Werkendam	PI Wolvenplein, Utrecht
4	Donny Ronny; Stuntje	Caught (day 3 at 17:00)	Episode 5	Den Helder	PI Wolvenplein, Utrecht
5	Tygo Gernandt	Caught (day 3 at 12:00)	Episode 4	Ameland	PI Wolvenplein, Utrecht
6	Thijs Zeeman	Caught (day 2 at 15:00)	Episode 3	Arnhem	PI Wolvenplein, Utrecht
7	Dyantha Brooks	Caught (day 2 at 14:45)	Episode 3	Arnhem	PI Wolvenplein, Utrecht
8	Ouassima Tajmout; Morad El Ouakili	Caught (day 2 at 12:00)	Episode 2	Zwolle	PI Wolvenplein, Utrecht
9	Michella Kox	Caught (day 1 at 16:00)	Episode 1	Nijmegen	PI Wolvenplein, Utrecht

=== Season 2 (2025) ===
The second season of Most Wanted consisted of ten episodes and was released from 21 June until 16 August 2025. A total of 18 contestants (6 duo's and 6 single contestants) were on the run.

Ranking	Contestant(s)	Result	Last seen in	Ending location	Starting location
1	Russo	Escaped	Episode 10	Amsterdam	PI Wolvenplein, Utrecht
1	Floris Göbel (Note: Iris Enthoven and Floris Göbel were a duo, but Iris got caught by Team-Stuk in the finale.)	Escaped	Episode 10	Amsterdam	PI Wolvenplein, Utrecht
2	Iris Enthoven	Caught (day 6 at 13:35)	Episode 10	Amsterdam	PI Wolvenplein, Utrecht
3	Selma Omari	Eliminated (day 5 at 16:35)	Episode 10	Amsterdam	PI Wolvenplein, Utrecht
4	Pauline Wingelaar; Leslie Keijzer	Caught (day 5 at 13:55)	Episode 9	Naarden	PI Wolvenplein, Utrecht
5	Renze Klamer; Tom van 't Einde	Caught (day 5 at 11:30)	Episode 8	Dordrecht	PI Wolvenplein, Utrecht
6	Zaar Goedemans	Caught (day 4 at 13:15)	Episode 7	Almere Haven	PI Wolvenplein, Utrecht
7	Bente Fokkens; Maik de Boer	Caught (day 4 at 11:45)	Episode 7	Emmeloord	PI Wolvenplein, Utrecht
8	Danny Ghosen	Caught (day 3 at 14:30)	Episode 5	Arnhem	PI Wolvenplein, Utrecht
9	Diva Brons	Caught (day 3 at 11:00)	Episode 4	Arnhem	PI Wolvenplein, Utrecht
10	Danny Froger; Ann Dominique Wilten	Caught (day 2 at 18:55)	Episode 4	Den Bosch	PI Wolvenplein, Utrecht
11	Elise Boers; Joey Jaq	Caught (day 2 at 10:40)	Episode 2	Eersel	PI Wolvenplein, Utrecht
12	Hef	Caught (day 1 at 17:35)	Episode 2	Breda	PI Wolvenplein, Utrecht

=== Season 3 (2026) ===
The third season was filmed from 18 until 22 April 2026. The season premiered on 2 May, while the finale was released on 27 June 2026. A total of 18 contestants (6 duo's and 6 single contestants) were on the run.

Ranking	Contestant(s)	Result	Last seen in	Ending location	Starting location
2 (Note: Because Jesse and Bilal got caught in the finale, Team-Stuk is deemed the winner of the season, thereby Jesse and Bilal end up at second place.)	Jesse Hoefnagels	Caught (day 5 at 18:00)	Episode 10	Rotterdam	Lelystad Airport
2	Bilal Wahib (Note: Bilal Wahib previously participated in the fifth and eighth season of the YouTube series in 2020 and 2023.)	Caught (day 5 at 18:00)	Episode 10	Rotterdam	Lelystad Airport
3	Maan (Note: Maan previously participated in the third season of the YouTube series in 2018.)	Eliminated (day 5 at 11:30)	Episode 10	Ruurlo	Lelystad Airport
3	Sean Demmers; Ta Joela	Eliminated (day 5 at 11:30)	Episode 10	Ruurlo	Lelystad Airport
4	Kelvin Boerma (Note: Kelvin Boerma previously participated in the third season of the YouTube series in 2018.); Nina Warink	Caught (day 4 at 13:02)	Episode 8	Twente Airport	Lelystad Airport
5	Wendy van Dijk (Note: Wendy van Dijk previously participated in the first season of the SBS6 series in 2021.); Sem van Dijk	Caught (day 4 at 11:25)	Episode 7	Vianen	Lelystad Airport
6	Numidia	Caught (day 2 at 19:44)	Episode 5	Hilversum	Lelystad Airport
7	Malgosia Lukaszczyk; King Faisel	Caught (day 2 at 18:15)	Episode 4	Bodegraven	Lelystad Airport
8	Camiel Kesbeke; Sylvian Kesbeke	Caught (day 2 at 14:05)	Episode 3	Enkhuizen	Lelystad Airport
9	Jack Plooij	Caught (day 1 at 21:57)	Episode 3	Veldhoven	Lelystad Airport
10	Samuel Welten	Caught (day 1 at 18:19)	Episode 2	's-Hertogenbosch	Lelystad Airport
11	Leontine Ruiters; Jada Borsato	Caught (day 1 at 15:40)	Episode 1	Tiel	Lelystad Airport

== Awards and nominations ==
Year	Award	Category	Result
2017	Hashtag Awards	Best Entertainment Video	Won
2018	Zapp Awards	Best YouTuber	Won
2018	VEED Awards	Best Series	Won
2019	VEED Awards	Best Series	Won
2019	Televizier-Ster	Online Video Series	Nominated
2020	Televizier-Ster	Online Video Series	Nominated
2021	Televizier-Ster	Online Video Series	Nominated
2022	Televizier-Ring	Best Television Series	Nominated
2023	Zapp Awards	Best Family Series	Won
2025	Televizier-Ring	Best Television Series (Most Wanted)	Nominated
2025	Dutch Reality Award	Beste Reality programme: Survival/adventure/competition (Most Wanted)	Won
