= De Tatta's =

2022 Dutch film directed by Jamel Aattache

- Theatrical release poster
- Directed by: Jamel Aattache
- Screenplay by: Donny Singh
- Story by: Donny Singh; Luuk Ornstein
- Produced by: Jamel Aattache; Paul Ruven
- Starring: Leo Alkemade; Leonie ter Braak; Sterre Koning; Sinan Eroglu; Oussama Ahammoud
- Cinematography: Christiaan Cats
- Edited by: Jelle Kuipers
- Music by: Jeffrey van Rossum
- Production companies: Talent United Film & TV; Brabant Films
- Distributed by: Independent Films
- Release date: 22 December 2022
- Running time: 87 minutes
- Country: Netherlands
- Language: Dutch
- Box office: $8,000,956

De Tatta's (Dutch for: The Tattas) is a 2022 Dutch comedy film directed by Jamel Aattache. The film won the Golden Film award after having sold 100,000 tickets. The film also won the Platinum Film award after having sold 400,000 tickets.

In the film, a wealthy family from an affluent neighbourhood moves to a poor neighbourhood after financial problems. Initially, the film was supposed to take place in the Gooi near Hilversum and the Bijlmermeer neighbourhood of Amsterdam, but these names were changed to fictional neighbourhoods after criticism.

Leo Alkemade, Leonie ter Braak, and Oussama Ahammoud play a role in the film. Principal photography took place in 2022. The film won the Gouden Kalf van het Publiek award at the 2023 Netherlands Film Festival.

In January 2023, the film surpassed half a million tickets sold. It became the best-visited Dutch film of 2023. In total, just over 690,000 tickets were sold in 2022 and 2023.

The sequel De Tatta's 2 was announced in March 2023. The sequel also won the Golden Film and Platinum Film awards. The third film in the film series is De Tatta's 3 (2025). A spin-off film titled De Tatta's: Daan premiered in October 2026. The story of the film is focused on the character Daan van Kempen played by Sem van der Horst. The film won the Golden Film award after having sold 100,000 tickets.

The film series De Tatta's also became a television series on Prime Video, titled De Tatta's: De Serie, with multiple actors reprising their roles. The first season of the show aired in 2024. The second season began in June 2026.

== Plot ==
The Van Kampen family is forced to move from a villa to a flat as a result of losing all their money in bad investments. They want to get their lives back on track as quickly as possible, until they meet their new neighbors.

== Cast ==
- Leo Alkemade as Erik van Kempen
- Leonie ter Braak as Laura van Kempen
- Sterre Koning as Jessica van Kempen
- Sem van der Horst as Daan van Kempen
- Sinan Eroglu as Volkan
- Oussama Ahammoud as Ilias
- Marouane Meftah as Appie
- Vonneke Bonneke as Beauty
- Genesis Akesson as Jayden
- Donny Singh as Satish Kumar
- Jeroen Rienks as zwerver
- Eline Havenaar as Pauline
- Fatma Genç as Dilek
- Francesco D'aquino as Luca
- Omar Ahaddaf as Mozes
- Ismaël Laglag as Pizza
- Chris Tates as Gerben
- Roosmarijn Wind as Trisha
- John Buijsman as Richard
- Janice Blok as Marleen
- Izzle as Furkan
