= Rokjesdag =

Dutch term meaning "skirts day"

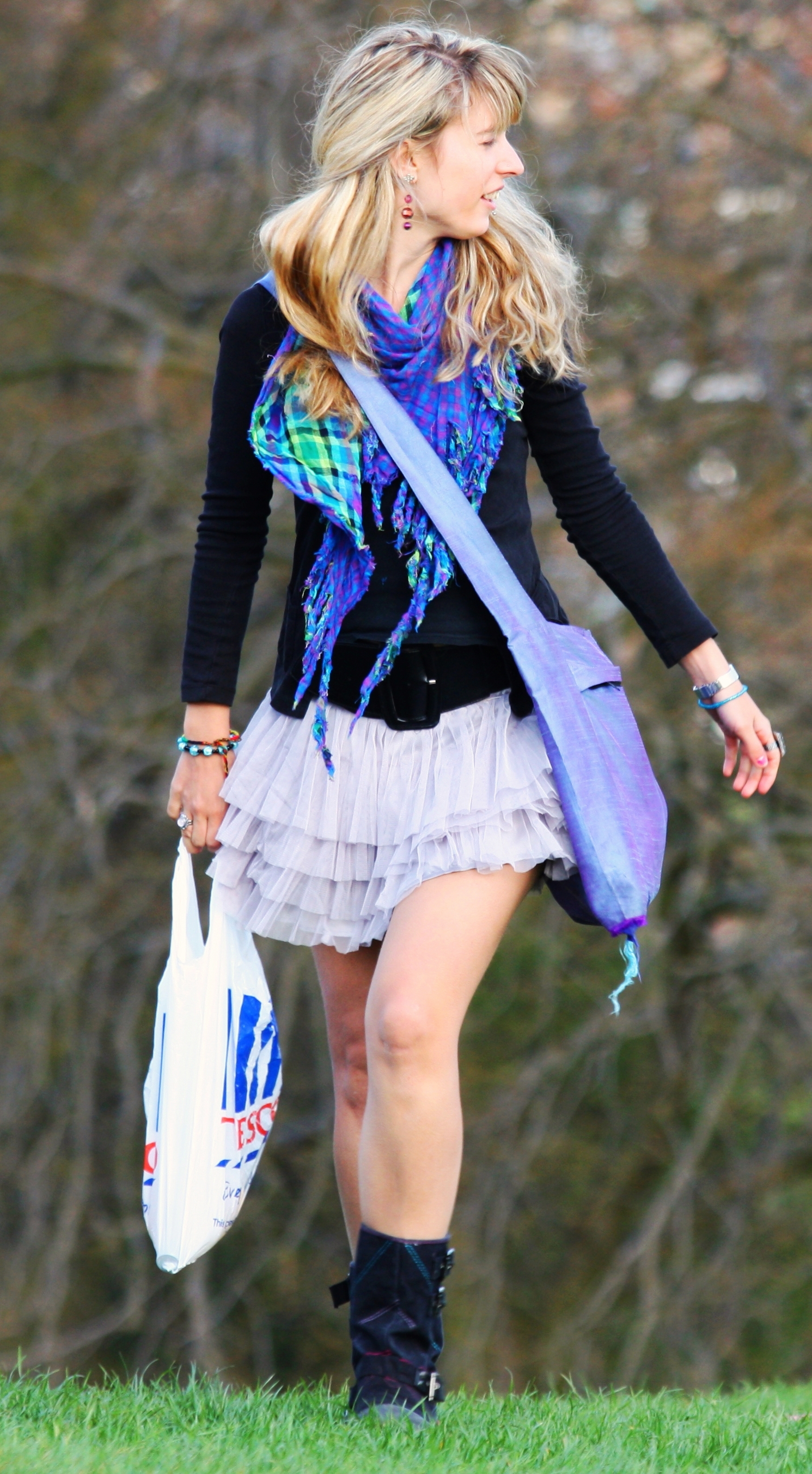
Woman wearing a skirt.

Rokjesdag is a Dutch term, meaning "skirts day", which is often used for a day in the springtime when many women begin wearing skirts for the first time in the year. The term is also used to refer to the first day when the weather is between 17 and 20 degrees.

The term had been used before it was popularized by Dutch writer and columnist Martin Bril, to whom its coinage is occasionally mistakenly attributed. Bril used the term "rokjesdag" for the first time in a 1996 column in Het Parool, after which he regularly used it in his columns, including in de Volkskrant. Bril's fascination was with the phenomenon that he sensed of women, as if by secret agreement, suddenly appearing outside with bare legs and a skirt.

The term became so popular that it was incorporated into the Dutch Van Dale dictionary, with a reference to the synonymous term "bloesjesdag" (blouses day).

An earlier reference to this phenomenon in the springtime is seen in François Truffaut's 1977 film L'Homme qui aimait les femmes.

In 2016 there was a Dutch film with the title Rokjesdag, directed by Johan Nijenhuis. In 2024, he directed the film Rokjesnacht (skirts night).

On 2 September 2017 there was a "skirts day for men" organized in Nijmegen.

In the United States "national skirt day" for men is held on March 10.
