= Leo Alkemade =

Dutch comedian and actor (born 1980)

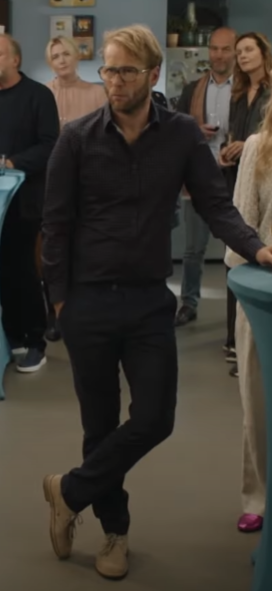
- Born: 6 August 1980 (age 46)
- Occupations: Comedian; Actor

Leo Alkemade (born 6 August 1980) is a Dutch cabaret artist, comedian and actor. He is one of the comedians in the sketch comedy television show Sluipschutters. He has played roles in multiple films, including Casanova's (2020), Zwanger & Co (2022) and De Tatta's film series. In his early career he performed multiple theatre shows with cabaret artist Roel Bloemen as the duo Alkemade & Bloemen.

== Career ==
=== Early career ===
Alkemade studied at the Koningstheateracademie in 's-Hertogenbosch, Netherlands where he met Roel Bloemen. They performed shows as the duo Alkemade & Bloemen and they won both the jury award and the audience award at the 2000 Groninger Studenten Cabaret Festival held in Groningen, Netherlands.

=== Film ===
Alkemade played a role in the 2004 film Hush Hush Baby directed by Albert ter Heerdt and in the 2014 film Gift from the Heart directed by Kees van Nieuwkerk. He also played a role in the 2017 film Tuintje in mijn hart directed by Marc Waltman. The film won the Golden Film award after having sold 100,000 tickets.

Alkemade played a role in the 2017 film Huisvrouwen bestaan niet directed by Aniëlle Webster. The film is an adaptation of the play De Huisvrouwmonologen. It became the best visited Dutch film of 2017 and it won the Golden Film award. He also played a role in the 2019 sequel Huisvrouwen bestaan niet 2 directed by Aniëlle Webster. This film also won the Golden Film award. He played roles in the 2020 film Casanova's directed by Jamel Aattache and in the 2022 film Zwanger & Co directed by Johan Nijenhuis.

Alkemade played roles in the comedy films De Tatta's (2022) and De Tatta's 2 (2023) directed by Jamel Aattache. Both films won the Platinum Film award after having sold 400,000 tickets. In 2024, he appeared in the romantic comedy film Expeditie Cupido directed by Erwin van den Eshof. He also played a role in the 2024 romantic comedy film Rokjesnacht directed by Johan Nijenhuis. Alkemade played a role in the 2025 film De Tatta's 3 directed by Jamel Aattache. The film won the Golden Film award after having sold 100,000 tickets. He also plays a role in a spin-off film titled De Tatta's: Daan which premiered in 2026. The story of the film is focused on the character Daan van Kempen played by Sem van der Horst. The film won the Golden Film award.

He plays a lead role in the 2026 film Champagne in which a son and his terminally ill father travel to the Champagne wine region in France. The film is directed by Tim Kamps and written by Leo Alkemade and Rik van den Bos. He plays the role of the son and Huub Stapel plays the role of the father. The film is a tribute to Alkemade's father and their shared love for champagne. Alkemade had also planned to travel to the Champagne wine region with his father but his father was unable to make the journey due to his failing health and he died a few weeks later. Alkemade travelled to the Champagne wine region on his own and he used this experience as inspiration for the film. The film won the Golden Film award after having sold 100,000 tickets.

=== Television ===
Alkemade played a role in comedy television series Shouf Shouf!. The series is based on the 2004 film Shouf Shouf Habibi! in which Alkemade also played a role. The first season of the television show aired in 2006. In 2011 and 2012, he was one of the comedians in the show Mag ik u kussen? presented by Art Rooijakkers in which multiple comedians compete to kiss a celebrity.

Since 2013, he is one of the comedians in the sketch comedy television show Sluipschutters with Ronald Goedemondt, Jochen Otten and Bas Hoeflaak. He played a role in the 2015 and 2016 television series Missie Aarde, a science fiction comedy mockumentary series set in the year 2063. The series has been described as a cross between The Office and Star Trek. He also played a role in the virtual reality film with the same name.

Alkemade was one of the actors in the satirical television show Kanniewaarzijn presented by Astrid Joosten. In the show, Joosten helps consumers that have an issue with a government agency, organisation or company and the show is both informative and humorous with comedic sketches. He appeared in the show from 2016 to 2019. Alkemade appeared in two seasons of the hidden camera comedy and reality show Foute Vrienden, one of the Dutch versions of the show Impractical Jokers.

He was one of the comedians in the 2019 season of the game show Echt Waar?! presented by Jan Versteegh. In 2020, Alkemade succeeded Guus Meeuwis as team captain in the quiz show Ik hou van Holland. Richard Groenendijk succeeded him as team captain in 2023. In 2021, he was one of the team captains in the quiz show Iedereen is van de wereld presented by Jan Versteegh. In the quiz, each team has to answer questions which are based on interviews that were conducted with people around the world. Alkemade and Dennis Weening were among the duos to present De Dansmarathon, a show in which contestants need to dance for fifty hours to win 100,000 euros. In the same year, he was one of the team captains in the quiz show The Bettle presented by Hélène Hendriks in which two teams answer questions about association football.

He was one of the presenters of the 2021 show Missions Impossible in which people attempt to complete a challenge. Hélène Hendriks, Jan Versteegh and Dennis van der Geest were also presenters of the show. In 2022, Alkemade and Leonie ter Braak presented the game show Van je familie moet je het hebben in which a contestant and their family attempt to answer the same questions to win a certain amount of money.

Since 2023, he appears in the comedy television show LOL: Last One Laughing which airs on Prime Video. The show is the Dutch version of the Japanese television show Documental. The film series De Tatta's also became a television series on Prime Video, titled De Tatta's: De Serie, with Alkemade and others reprising their roles. The first season of the show aired in 2024. The second season began in June 2026.

=== Television appearances ===
Alkemade was a contestant in the 2012 season of the game show Fort Boyard. He was also a contestant in the 2013 season of the game show De Pelgrimscode presented by Bert van Leeuwen. He competed in the 2014 season of the show Expeditie Robinson. In 2018, Alkemade appeared in the singing competition show It Takes 2. He also appeared in a 2018 episode of the game show De Jongens tegen de Meisjes. He was a contestant in the 2020 quiz show Quiz met Ballen presented by Frank Evenblij. Alkemade and Xander de Buisonjé competed as duo in a 2021 episode of the show Het Jachtseizoen. He appeared in the 2021 Christmas special of the singing show Onmogelijke Duetten presented by Nick Schilder and Simon Keizer.

Alkemade and Dennis Weening were contestants in a 2023 episode of the game show The Big Bang. Alkemade and his son appeared in a 2024 episode of the singing show DNA Singers, a show in which a relative of a Dutch singer sings a song and two teams have to guess who the person is related to. He also appeared in a 2024 episode of the singing competition show Secret Duets. He stayed in the monastery in Wittem, Netherlands for three days for a 2026 episode of the show Kloostergasten.

=== Other activities ===
In 2021, Alkemade played the role of Peter in The Passion, a Dutch Passion Play held every Maundy Thursday since 2011.

Since 2022, Alkemade and his daughter Liselot appear in commercials of the holiday company Prijsvrij Vakanties.

Alkemade is also a singer. He released his debut album In Het Wiel in 2022. The album is about his hobby cycling.

== Personal life ==
Alkemade and his wife Margriet married in 2006 and they have four children (three sons and one daughter).

== Selected filmography ==
=== As actor (film) ===
- Hush Hush Baby (2004)
- Gift from the Heart (2014)
- Missie Aarde (2016, virtual reality film)
- Tuintje in mijn hart (2017)
- Love Revisited (2017)
- Huisvrouwen bestaan niet (2017)
- Huisvrouwen bestaan niet 2 (2019)
- Casanova's (2020)
- Zwanger & Co (2022)
- De Tatta's (2022)
- De Tatta's 2 (2023)
- Expeditie Cupido (2024)
- De Mannenmaker (2024)
- Rokjesnacht (2024)
- Dochters (2025)
- De Tatta's 3 (2025)
- Champagne (2026)
- De Tatta's: Daan (2026)

=== As actor (television) ===
- Shouf Shouf!
- Sluipschutters (2013 – present, sketch comedy)
- Kanniewaarzijn (2016–2019, sketch comedy)
- De Tatta's: De Serie (2024, 2026, Prime Video)

=== As presenter ===
- De Dansmarathon (2021)
- The Bettle (2021)
- Missions Impossible (2021)
- Van je familie moet je het hebben (2022)

=== As team captain ===
- Ik hou van Holland (2020 – 2022)
- Iedereen is van de wereld (2021)
- The Bettle (2021)

=== As contestant ===
- Mag ik u kussen? (2011–2012)
- Fort Boyard (2012)
- De Pelgrimscode (2013)
- Expeditie Robinson (2014)
- It Takes 2 (2018)
- De Jongens tegen de Meisjes (2018)
- Quiz met Ballen (2020)
- Code van Coppens: De wraak van de Belgen (2021, 2024)
- Het Jachtseizoen (2021, duo with Xander de Buisonjé)
- Top 4000 Muziekquiz (2021, duo with Birgit Schuurman)
- Onmogelijke Duetten (2021)
- The Big Bang (2023)
- Secret Duets (2024)
- DNA Singers (2024)
- LOL: Last One Laughing (2023 – present, Prime Video)

=== As guest ===
- Adieu God? (2025)
- Casa di Beau Winterspecial (2026)
- Kloostergasten (2026)
