= Renze Klamer =

Dutch radio and television presenter (born 1989)

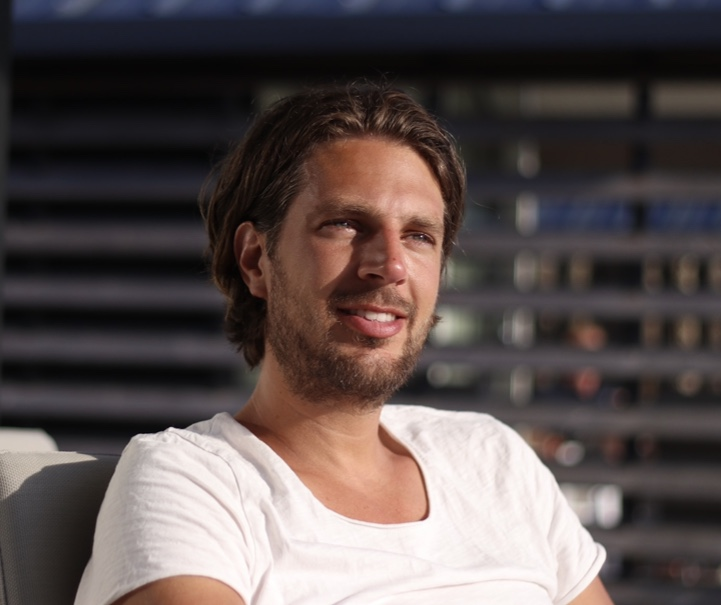
- Born: 12 May 1989 (age 37); Rotterdam, Netherlands
- Occupations: Talk show host; Television presenter; Radio presenter
- Known for: Renze

Renze Klamer (born 12 May 1989) is a Dutch radio and television presenter. He is known for presenting his own talk show Renze between 2022 and 2025 and since August 2026. He was also one of the hosts of the talk show RTL Tonight in 2025. He presented shows for the Evangelische Omroep and BNNVARA and since 2022 he presents shows for RTL.

== Career ==
Klamer began working for the Evangelische Omroep (EO) in 2009. At first, he worked in the marketing department. He was one of the presenters of the EO Youth Day, an annual event for young Christians, in 2011 and 2012. He was one of the presenters of the radio shows Dit is de dag and Langs de Lijn En Omstreken. He switched to work for BNNVARA in 2018.

Klamer presented the talk show Laat op Vrijdag in 2020. The first episode aired in February 2020. A few months later, the show moved to an earlier time slot in the evening and the show was renamed to Op Vrijdag. Klamer and Fidan Ekiz presented two seasons of the talk show De Vooravond in 2020 and 2021. The talk show Khalid & Sophie presented by Khalid Kasem and Sophie Hilbrand became the successor of the show in 2021.

Klamer switched to work for RTL in 2022. In 2023 and 2024, he presented the television show Het Onbekende in which contestants agree to take part with everything being unknown: they are not told anything about the show, the rules of the game or the date and time when the show would begin.

Klamer began presenting his own talk show Renze in July 2022. He was nominated for the 2024 Sonja Barend Award for his conversation with politician Pieter Omtzigt in the show. Renze ended in 2025, as well as the talk shows Beau and Humberto presented by Beau van Erven Dorens and Humberto Tan respectively, and a new talk show RTL Tonight began in August 2025. Klamer was one of the presenters of RTL Tonight but he stopped presenting the show as the show was not a good fit for him. The show struggled with low viewing figures from the start and the last episode aired in June 2026. Renze returned in August 2026.

Klamer plays a small role in the 2025 film Lekker met de meiden directed by Anna van Keimpema.

Since October 2026, he co-hosts the Niet voor uitzending podcast for Videoland together with Tom van 't Einde and Gijs Rademaker.

=== Television appearances ===
In 2019, Klamer appeared in the speed skating television show De ijzersterkste presented by Toine van Peperstraten. He was a guest in a 2024 episode of the television show Casa di Beau presented by Beau van Erven Dorens. Klamer was a drag queen in the 2024–2025 New Year's Special of the television series Make Up Your Mind. He appeared as the drag queen Bente Laat in the show.

== Personal life ==
Klamer and Pearl Jozefzoon married in 2014 and they have two children, a son and a daughter. Their marriage ended in 2019.

== Selected filmography ==
=== As presenter ===
- Laat op Vrijdag / Op Vrijdag (2020)
- De Vooravond (2020, 2021)
- Renze (2022–2025, 2026–present)
- Het Onbekende (2023, 2024)
- RTL Tonight (2025)

=== As actor ===
- Lekker met de meiden (2025)

=== As contestant ===
- De ijzersterkste (2019)
- Make Up Your Mind (2024)
- Het Jachtseizoen: Most Wanted (2025)

=== As himself ===
- Casa di Beau (2024)
