= Tiger Theory =

2016 Czech adventure comedy film

- Czech movie poster
- Directed by: Radek Bajgar
- Written by: Radek Bajgar, Mirka Zlatníková
- Produced by: Petr Erben
- Starring: Jiří Bartoška
- Cinematography: Vladimír Holomek
- Edited by: Jan Mattlach
- Music by: Jan P. Muchow
- Distributed by: CinemArt
- Release date: March 31, 2016
- Running time: 101 minutes
- Country: Czech Republic
- Language: Czech
- Box office: 44,569,162 CZK

Tiger Theory (Czech: Teorie tygra) is a 2016 Czech adventure comedy film directed by Radek Bajgar. It is a debut title for Bajgar. It stars Jiří Bartoška and Eliška Balzerová.

== Plot ==
The life of veterinarian Jan Berger is usurped by his wife Olga. Olga doesn't give him any free time and he is tired of it. The last drop comes when Olga's father voluntarily ends his life. Jan realizes that the life of his father in law was controlled the same way as Jan's is. Jan knows that he will end up the same way. Jan pretends that he has Alzheimer's disease and is put in a Psychiatric hospital which is headed by his friend who gives him freedom. Only Jan's son Jakub and son in law Erik know the truth. Erik is married to Jan's daughter Olinka who is pushed by her mother and grandmother to control Erik's life the same way as Olga controls Jan's life. Pepík on the other hand is happily married to Alena, who is quite opposite to the other women in the family and gives Pepík his free space. Their only problem is that Pepík can't have children. Erik and Jakub are secretly meeting Jan at weekends to enjoy some time together. This makes the women suspicious and Olinka enables an app in Erik's mobile phone which sends coordinates to her. This leads to the revelation of the truth and Jan returns home. Erik is angry at Olinka and leaves home. Olinka then realizes the wrongs of her mother and grandmother when she hears Jan telling that his wife ruined 40 years of his life and when she sees Pepík and Alena happy. Jan decides to divorce Olga and leaves home. Olinka decides to help him and provides him with a houseboat that belonged to Olga's father so that Jan has a roof over his head. This helps her to repair the relationship with Erik. Olga is then seen bitterly giving a lecture about divorced men being unable to be happy while divorced women are able to enjoy life. The closure shows the contrast of her lecture with reality as Jan is shown at last being happy and enjoying his time with Erik and Olinka as they toast in honor of Jan's father in law.

== Cast ==
- Jiří Bartoška as Jan Berger
- Eliška Balzerová as Olga Bergerová
- Tatiana Vilhelmová as Olinka
- Jiří Havelka as Erik
- Jakub Kohák as Pepík Berger
- Pavla Beretová as Alena Bergerová
- Iva Janžurová as Grandmother

== Reception ==
The film has received positive response from critics and audience alike.

A Dutch remake was created in 2020 by producer Johan Nijenhuis, called The Marriage Escape (De beentjes van Sint-Hildegard in Dutch), starring Herman Finkers as the main character and mainly spoken in Tweants dialect.
