= Hélène Hendriks =

Dutch television presenter (born 1980)

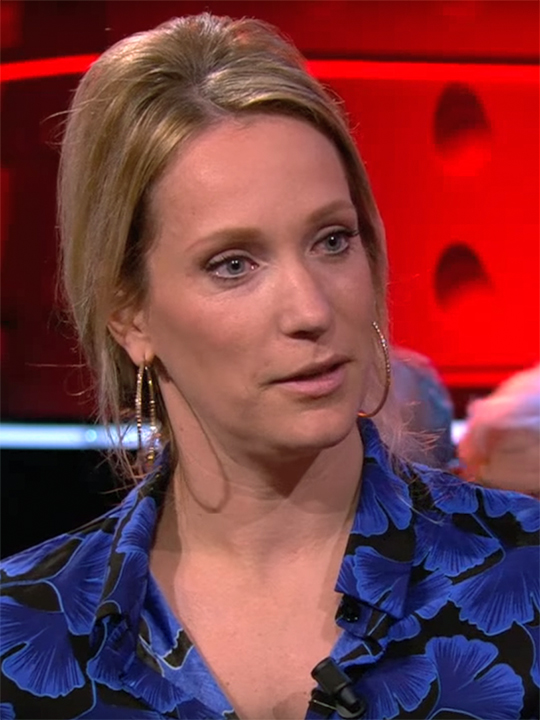
- Hendriks in 2017
- Born: 6 August 1980 (age 46)
- Occupation: Television presenter

Hélène Hendriks (born 6 August 1980) is a Dutch television presenter. She has presented many sports-related television shows. She won the Televizier-Ring Presentator award for best presenter in 2023.

== Career ==
Hendriks worked for regional broadcasting organisations Brabant10, Breda TV and Omroep Brabant. She began working for FOX Sports in 2013. She presented the association football quiz show Matchwinner Pro for RTL 7 in 2017. Wilfred Genee presented the first season of the show titled Matchwinner in 2016. Hendriks was a co-host (tafeldame) alongside host Matthijs van Nieuwkerk in the early-evening talk show show De Wereld Draait Door.

In 2018, she began working for Talpa TV. In January 2019, she won the 2018 Sportjournalist van het jaar award for best sports journalist. Hendriks and Wilfred Genee presented two seasons of the talk show Café Hendriks & Genee in 2019. She was one of the experts in the news and entertainment show 6 Inside in 2019. The show 6 Inside ended after one season.

Hendriks presented the game show The Big Balance in 2021 in which contestants compete in highlining. Klaasje Meijer won this season of the show. In the same year, she presented the quiz show The Bettle in which two teams answer questions about association football. Frank Lammers and Leo Alkemade were the team captains. She was one of the presenters of the 2021 show Missions Impossible in which people attempt to complete a challenge. Leo Alkemade, Jan Versteegh and Dennis van der Geest were also presenters of the show.

Since 2023, Hendriks presents the show De Oranjezomer which looks at a variety of topics, including news and sports events. The show's name changes depending on when the show airs: De Oranjezomer in summer, De Oranjewinter in winter and De Oranjezondag as Sunday edition. She also presented the show in 2021 as replacement of Wilfred Genee. Hendriks was one of the presenters of the talk show HLF8 in 2022 and 2023. She won the Televizier-Ring Presentator award for best presenter in 2023. She was also nominated for the award in 2021.

In 2024, Hendriks and Noa Vahle began working for Ziggo Sport, alongside their work for Talpa Network. They presented the show Wij houden van Oranje about the Netherlands national football team in preparation for the UEFA Euro 2024 tournament held in Germany. She was one of the presenters of the 2024 show De Beste Wensen in which the presenters make dreams come true.

Hendriks was nominated for the Televizier-Ring Presentator award for best presenter in 2025. In January and February 2026, she presented the first season of the music competition show The Winner Takes It All. In the show, contestants compete against each other in musical duels on a large floor with LED lights. After each duel, the winner claims the opponent's part of the floor and the goal is to convert the whole floor to win the competition.

Since December 2025, Hélène Hendriks, Noa Vahle and Merel Ek host HNM De podcast, a podcast named after the first letter of each of their names.

In 2026, she presented De Staatsloterij Show, a new version of the show previously presented by Marc Klein Essink. The second season of the show began in September 2026, also presented by Hendriks.

== Personal life ==
Hendriks has two sisters and they are a triplet. Her father died in 2023.

== Awards ==
- Sportjournalist van het jaar (2018)
- Televizier-Ring Presentator (2023)

== Selected filmography ==
=== As presenter ===
- Matchwinner Pro
- Café Hendriks & Genee (2019)
- The Big Balance (2021)
- The Bettle (2021)
- Missions Impossible (2021)
- De Oranjezomer / De Oranjewinter / De Oranjezondag (2021 – present)
- HLF8 (2022–2023)
- Wij houden van Oranje (2024)
- De Beste Wensen (2024)
- The Winner Takes It All (2026 – present)
- De Staatsloterij Show (2026)

=== As co-host / expert ===
- De Wereld Draait Door
- 6 Inside (2019)

=== As contestant ===
- Top 4000 Muziekquiz (2020, with Dennis van der Geest)
- Marble Mania (2021, with Hans Kraay Jr. and Toine van Peperstraten)
- Het Jachtseizoen (2022, with Anouk Hoogendijk)
- Top 4000 Muziekquiz (2023, with Johan Derksen)
