= Blow Up (Dutch TV series) =

- Presented by: Martijn Krabbé (S1 and S2); Chantal Janzen (S1); Leonie ter Braak (S2)
- Judges: Guido Verhoef (S1 and S2)
- Country of origin: Netherlands
- Original language: Dutch
- No. of seasons: 2
- No. of episodes: 12

Original release
- Network: RTL 4
- Release: 3 June 2022

Blow Up is a Dutch television show in which contestants compete in balloon modelling. Martijn Krabbé and Chantal Janzen presented the first season of the show in 2022. Krabbé and Leonie ter Braak presented the second season of the show.

Balloon artist Guido Verhoef served as judge in the first season of the show, together with a guest judge in each episode.

The format of the show was sold to Australia and Germany. The Australian version is hosted by Stephen Curry and Becky Lucas.
