= The Marriage Escape =

2020 Dutch film directed by Johan Nijenhuis

- Theatrical release poster
- Directed by: Johan Nijenhuis
- Written by: Herman Finkers
- Produced by: Johan Nijenhuis; Ingmar Menning
- Starring: Herman Finkers; Johanna ter Steege; Leonie ter Braak
- Cinematography: Maarten van Keller
- Edited by: Bas Icke
- Music by: Martijn Schimmer
- Production companies: Johan Nijenhuis & Co; Omroep MAX
- Distributed by: September Film Distribution
- Release date: 13 February 2020
- Running time: 103 minutes
- Country: Netherlands
- Languages: Tweants; Dutch; English; German
- Box office: $7,7 million

The Marriage Escape (Dutch: De Beentjes van Sint-Hildegard is a 2020 Dutch comedy-drama film directed by Johan Nijenhuis. The film is an adaptation of the 2016 Czech film Tiger Theory, and it is the first cinema film predominantly spoken in the Tweants variety of Low Saxon, although the title is in Dutch.

The film won the Golden Film award after having sold 100,000 tickets and the film also won the Platinum Film award after having sold 400,000 tickets. In total, more than 710,000 tickets were sold and the film became the best visited Dutch film and highest-grossing Dutch film of 2020. It was also the third best visited film in the Netherlands in 2020, with 1917 and Tenet in first and second place respectively.

In December 2020, it was announced that The Marriage Escape was the best Dutch film of 2020 according to the 'Kring van Nederlandse Filmjournalisten', the Dutch organisation for professional film journalists and film critics. In September 2021, Herman Finkers received the Zilveren Krulstaart award for best screenplay of a 2020 Dutch film.

On Koningsdag 2021, the film premiered on television with 2,500,000 viewers, making it the best viewed film on Dutch television since 2002.

Herman Finkers and Leonie ter Braak made their film debut in this film. Principal photography began in September 2018 and filming took place in Twente, Belgium and Germany.

== Plot ==
Arend, the 89-year-old father-in-law of the main character, Jan, decides to make his greatest wish come true. For years, he has been planning to make a pilgrimage on foot to Rüdesheim am Rhein, where the remains of Saint Hildegard of Bingen are kept. However, his wife has never let him go. One morning, when he finally gathers the courage and sets out on the journey with his donkey, he collapses in Bad Bentheim and dies.

Jan has been married to Gedda for 35 years and has two children with her. He is a veterinarian, and Gedda works at the University of Twente, where she has earned her Ph.D. (magna cum laude) conducting research on the increased life expectancy of men who are supported by women in everything they do. In the run-up to Arend’s funeral, despite Arend himself preferring to be cremated and to have his ashes scattered at the Lorelei, Jan realizes how little say Arend had at home and how much his wife Gedda resembles her mother in that regard.

When a couple they are friends with announces their separation, Jan cautiously asks Gedda how she would react if he wanted a divorce. Gedda doesn’t pick up on the serious undertone in his question and jokes that they’ll never be able to get rid of each other. To avoid talking back to her, and because he feels indebted to Gedda for helping him through a difficult period 35 years ago, he dismisses divorce as a solution. After visiting a sick goat, however, Jan gets a peculiar idea: he decides to pretend he has Alzheimer’s disease so he can be admitted to a nursing home and finally be freed from his wife’s control.

The nursing home director, however, quickly realizes that there is nothing wrong with Jan. After a week of settling in among the people with dementia, the director gives Jan another week to think about the situation and make decisions before sending him back to his wife. He sends Jan on his way, and Jan takes the train to Bad Bentheim to complete the pilgrimage to Saint Hildegard that his father-in-law had begun. He confides in his two children and has them come to Germany to explain the whole situation to them and accompany him on his journey. However, the pathologically jealous boyfriend of Jan's daughter manages to track down the trio’s whereabouts, and so Jan's plans are ultimately exposed to Gedda.

Jan makes it clear to Gedda that he loves her very much, but that he wants to take back control of his own life. After a brief moment of reflection on the new situation, however, Gedda falls back into her old controlling ways. She tells him she can’t change. Jan then immediately grabs his bag so he can finish his father-in-law’s pilgrimage. While Gedda is at work lecturing on the pitiful life of a single man, Jan, this time accompanied by Arend’s donkey, cheerfully enjoys his journey along the Rhine, during which he eventually scatters his father-in-law’s ashes, and then lights a candle when he visits St. Hildegard.

== Cast ==
- Herman Finkers as Jan
- Johanna ter Steege as Gedda
- Leonie ter Braak as Liesbeth
- Jan Roerink as Opa Arend
- Annie Beumers as Oma Sinie
- Ferdi Stofmeel as Erik
- Erik Dijkstra as Mark
- Mick Idzes as Driekus
- Stef Assen as Peter
- Aniek Stokkers as Ilse
- Daphne Bunskoek as Julia
- Reinier Bulder as Antoon
- Jos Brummelhuis as Bert Dammink
- Jeffrey Spalburg as Agent
- Karlijn Lansink as Neuroloog
- Belinda van der Stoep as Uroloog
