= Ernst, Bobbie, en de geslepen Onix =

2007 film

- Theatrical release poster
- Directed by: Pieter Walther Boer
- Written by: Tijs van Marle
- Story by: Erik van Trommel
- Cinematography: Joost van Herwijnen
- Edited by: Martyn Gould
- Distributed by: Independent Films
- Release date: 14 February 2007
- Running time: 65 minutes
- Country: Netherlands
- Language: Dutch

Ernst, Bobbie, en de geslepen Onix (English translation: Ernest, Bobby, and the Cut Onyx) is a 2007 Dutch children's film based on the TV show Ernst, Bobbie en de rest. The film received a Golden Film for 100,000 visitors.
