= Blow Up (Australian TV series) =

Australian reality TV series

- Genre: Reality
- Presented by: Stephen Curry; Becky Lucas
- Judges: Chris Adamo
- Country of origin: Australia
- Original language: English
- No. of seasons: 1
- No. of episodes: 8

Production
- Production location: Melbourne, Victoria
- Production company: Endemol Shine Australia

Original release
- Network: Seven Network (episodes 1-2); 7flix (episodes 3-8)
- Release: 15 May – 6 June 2023

Blow Up is an Australian reality television show based on a Dutch format, in which ten artists compete to create the best balloon artworks for a $100,000 prize. It is hosted by Stephen Curry and Becky Lucas and judged by professional balloon artist Chris Adamo. The series premiered on 15 May 2023 on the Seven Network.

The programme is produced by Endemol Shine Australia and was first announced in August 2022. It commenced filming in the same month in Melbourne, and was officially confirmed at Seven's 2023 upfronts in October 2022.

After the first two episodes drew disappointing ratings, the series was moved to 7flix from its third episode.

== Contestants ==
Contestant	Age	State	Status
Justin Williams	31	VIC	Winner
Matt Falloon	38	NSW	2nd place
Donna Cochrane	42	QLD	3rd place
Chloe Lim	40	ACT	4th/5th place
Tammie Timmers	37	VIC	4th/5th place
Nicole Brusic	50	SA	
Robbie Kay	34	SA	
Michelle Ferron	33	VIC	
Brendan Ord	49	VIC	
Trevor Timmers	37	VIC	

== Reception ==
=== Viewership ===
Although highly advertised for weeks, the series debuted to 288,000 viewers, coming third in its timeslot behind MasterChef Australia and The Summit, respectively, and ranking 19th for the night. The second episode fared no better, with only 224,000 viewers, losing more than 40,000 from its debut and coming fifth in its timeslot, and ranking below the top 20 programs of the night. After the series was moved to 7flix, the third episode drew 30,000 viewers. The final episode drew just 16,000 viewers.

=== Critical ===
The show has been unfavourably compared to the similar television show Lego Masters (also produced by Endermol Shine and airing on the rival Nine Network), which had concluded its fifth season just a week before the premiere of Blow Up. Hamish Blake, the host of Lego Masters also poked fun at the premise of the show, stating in an episode of Lego Masters that "Balloons are good for a part of one episode of a show. No, I don’t think there’s a series in them."
