= Leonie ter Braak =

Dutch television presenter and actress

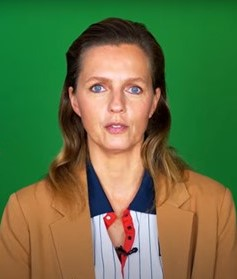
- Ter Braak (2022)
- Born: 28 September 1980 (age 45); Buurse, Netherlands
- Occupations: Actress; Television presenter; Model

Leonie ter Braak (born 28 September 1980) is a Dutch television presenter and actress. She is known for presenting several television shows, including the talk shows HLF8 and RTL Tonight. She also played a role in the 2020 film The Marriage Escape, the 2022 film De Tatta's and the 2023 film De Tatta's 2.

== Career ==
=== Television ===
Ter Braak began her career as a model. After her modelling career she began presenting television shows for RTV Oost. In 2010, she presented the television show Keuringsdienst van Waarde for KRO-NCRV, a consumer television program which looks at food production, labels on food products as well as the production of other consumer products. In 2012, she became a presenter for WNL.

In 2018, Ter Braak became a presenter for Talpa Network (SBS6). In that same year, she presented the television show Wat is de uitslag? in which people get to hear an important result, such as whether they have passed an exam or a medical examination. She also presented the 2019 television show Niets liever dan een kind which follows people trying to become pregnant.

In 2019, Ter Braak was one of the team captains in the television game show Mars versus Venus, a quiz show about the differences between men and women. She was the team captain of the female team and Jan Versteegh was team captain of the male team. Ter Braak presented the 2020 television show Uit het leven gegrepen: Erasmus MC about patients and staff of the Erasmus MC in Rotterdam, Netherlands.

In 2021, she presented Kinderen kopen ideale huis in which children, rather than the parents, choose a home to purchase. In that same year, Ter Braak and Wendy van Dijk presented Cupido Ofzo in which they follow people with a disability or people with neurodiverse differences in their search for love. In 2022, Ter Braak and Leo Alkemade presented the quiz show Van je familie moet je het hebben in which a contestant and their family attempt to answer the same questions to win a certain amount of money.

In 2022, Ter Braak became one of the presenters of the talk show HLF8. She previously appeared as sidekick in the show. In January 2023, Ter Braak began working for RTL Nederland. She became one of the presenters of the television show Blow Up in which contestants compete in balloon modelling. She also presented the show Voor Hetzelfde Geld, in which people search for an affordable house to purchase outside of the Randstad area.

In 2024, Ter Braak presented the television news quiz show Wat een dag!. The show was cancelled after disappointing viewing figures. She also presents B&B Vol Liefde. Ter Braak became one of the hosts of the talk show RTL Tonight in December 2025. The show struggled with low viewing figures from the start and the last episode aired in June 2026.

In 2026, she became one of the presenters of the ninth season of the show Kopen Zonder Kijken after Martijn Krabbé was no longer able to present the show due to his health. Krabbé did the voice-over and the show was presented by multiple presenters. In the show, people purchase a home without having seen it first and the team of Kopen Zonder Kijken makes all relevant decisions based on budget and preferences.

As of March 2026, she is scheduled to become the presenter of the next season of Het Perfecte Plaatje op Reis as Tijl Beckand is unable to combine the show with his other work.

=== Film ===
Ter Braak played a role in the 2020 film The Marriage Escape directed by Johan Nijenhuis. It was her film debut. The film became the best visited Dutch film of 2020.

Ter Braak played a role in the 2022 film Zwanger & Co directed by Johan Nijenhuis. In that same year, she played a role in the film De Tatta's directed by Jamel Aattache. She also appears in the 2023 film De Tatta's 2. These three films won the Golden Film award after having sold 100,000 tickets. De Tatta's and De Tatta's 2 also won the Platinum Film award after having sold 400,000 tickets.

=== Television appearances ===
In 2015, she was a guest in the first episode of De Jopie Parlevliet Show, a talk show hosted by Richard Groenendijk as his alter ego Jopie Parlevliet. Ter Braak was one of the contestants in the 2020 season of the television show Wie is de Mol?.

Ter Braak was one of the contestants in the 2023 television photography show Het Perfecte Plaatje op Reis. In the show, contestants compete to create the best photo in various challenges. She finished in first place. She also appeared in a 2023 episode of the show Rooijakkers over de vloer presented by Art Rooijakkers.

She was a contestant in the 2026 King's Day Special of the singing competition television show The Masked Singer.

== Selected filmography ==
=== Film ===
- The Marriage Escape (2020)
- Zwanger & Co (2022)
- De Tatta's (2022)
- De Tatta's 2 (2023)

=== As presenter ===
- Wat is de uitslag? (2018)
- Niets liever dan een kind (2019)
- Uit het leven gegrepen: Erasmus MC (2020)
- Kinderen kopen ideale huis (2021)
- Cupido Ofzo (2021)
- Van je familie moet je het hebben (2022)
- HLF8 (2022)
- Blow Up (2023)
- Voor Hetzelfde Geld (2024)
- Wat een dag! (2024)
- Wonen onder de zon voor minder dan een ton (2024)
- B&B Vol Liefde (2024 – present)
- Winter Vol Liefde (2025, 2026)
- RTL Tonight (2025 – 2026)
- Kopen Zonder Kijken (2026)
- Het Perfecte Plaatje op Reis (upcoming)

=== As team captain ===
- Mars versus Venus (2019)
- Doet-ie 't of doet-ie 't niet (2024)

=== As contestant ===
- Ranking the Stars (2015)
- Weet Ik Veel (2016)
- De Jongens tegen de Meisjes (2017)
- Dit was het nieuws (2018, 2020)
- Wie is de Mol? (2020)
- Het Perfecte Plaatje op Reis (2023)
- The Masked Singer (2026, King's Day Special)

=== As herself ===
- De Jopie Parlevliet Show (2015)
- Rooijakkers over de vloer (2023)
- Casa di Beau (2025)
