= HLF8 =

Dutch television talk show

- Presented by: Johnny de Mol; Hélène Hendriks; Leonie ter Braak; Sam Hagens
- Country of origin: Netherlands
- Original language: Dutch
- No. of seasons: 4

Original release
- Network: SBS6
- Release: 6 September 2021 – 7 April 2023

HLF8 (Note: Short for half eight, in reference to its starting time of 7:30 p.m. as written in the Netherlands.) is a Dutch television talk show, broadcast every weekday at 7:30 p.m. on SBS6 between 2021 and 2023. The show was first presented by Johnny de Mol. Hélène Hendriks and Leonie ter Braak became presenters of the show in April 2022 after De Mol stopped due to misconduct allegations. Sam Hagens also presented the show for three months in 2023. De Mol returned to the show in 2023.

In March 2023, it was announced that the show would end due to disappointing viewing figures. The last episode of the show was on 7 April 2023.

Catherine Keyl was nominated for the 2022 Sonja Barend Award for her conversation with Johnny de Mol in an episode of the talk show.
