= RTL Tonight =

Dutch television talk show

- Presented by: Beau van Erven Dorens; Humberto Tan; Leonie ter Braak; Renze Klamer
- Country of origin: Netherlands
- Original language: Dutch

Original release
- Network: RTL 4
- Release: 31 August 2025 – 12 June 2026

RTL Tonight is a Dutch television talk show presented by Beau van Erven Dorens, Humberto Tan and Leonie ter Braak on RTL 4. Renze Klamer was also a presenter but stopped presenting the show in November 2025. The first episode aired on 31 August 2025. The show was the successor of the talk shows Renze, Humberto and Beau.

Leonie ter Braak became one of the hosts of the talk show in December 2025.

The show struggled with low viewing figures from the start. The show was cancelled on 29 March 2026 and the last episode aired on 12 June 2026.

Klamer returned with his own talk show in the same timeslot, in the fall of 2026, with van Erven Dorens, Tan and ter Braak not returning. The first episode of his talk show aired on 31 August 2026. Welmoed Sijtsma is set to alternate with her own talk show in early 2027, leaving WNL to transfer to RTL 4.

== Staff ==
=== Presenters ===
- Beau van Erven Dorens
- Humberto Tan
- Leonie ter Braak
- Renze Klamer (2025)

=== Commentators ===
The show featured a set of commentators with recurring appearances, leaving little room for guests.

- Ahmed Aboutaleb (politics, society)
- Saskia Belleman (crime, justice)
- Floor Bremer (politics, society)
- Ben van der Burg (science, innovation)
- Floor Doppen (politics, society)
- Josine Droogendijk (royal family)
- Thomas Erdbrink (politics, society)
- Frank Evenblij (sports)
- Anna Gimbrère (science, innovation)
- Lale Gül (politics, society)
- Geert Jan Hahn (politics, society)
- Astrid Holleeder (crime, justice)
- Twan Huys (politics, society)
- Raounak Khaddari (politics, society)
- Martijn Kitzen (politics, society)
- Gijs Rademaker (politics, society)
- Sander Schimmelpenninck (politics, society)
- Heleen Snijders (Health)
- Simon van Teutem (politics, society)
- Albert Verlinde (media, entertainment)
- Michiel Vos (politics, society)
- Erben Wennemars (sports)
- Frits Wester (politics, society)
- Lara Zevenberg (media, entertainment)

=== Voice-overs ===
- Shay Kreuger
- Joey van der Velden (2025)
- Domien Verschuuren (2026)

=== Reporters ===
- Jaïr Ferwerda
- Stijn de Vries (2025)

=== Sidekick ===
- Wiesje Hillen (2025)
