= De Tatta's 2 =

2023 Dutch film directed by Jamel Aattache

- Theatrical release poster
- Directed by: Jamel Aattache
- Screenplay by: Donny Singh
- Produced by: Jamel Aattache; Paul Ruven
- Starring: Leo Alkemade; Leonie ter Braak; Sterre Koning; Sem van der Horst; John Buijsman
- Cinematography: Christiaan Cats
- Edited by: Jelle Kuipers
- Music by: Jeffery van Rossum
- Production companies: Talent United Film & TV; Brabant Films
- Distributed by: Independent Films
- Release date: 14 December 2023
- Running time: 86 minutes
- Country: Netherlands
- Language: Dutch
- Box office: $6,008,114

De Tatta's 2 (Dutch for: The Tattas 2) is a 2023 Dutch comedy film directed by Jamel Aattache. The film won the Golden Film award after having sold 100,000 tickets. The film also won the Platinum Film award after having sold 400,000 tickets. It is the sequel to the 2022 film De Tatta's which is also directed by Jamel Aattache.

De Tatta's 2 became the second best visited Dutch film of 2023. In total, just over 510,000 tickets were sold in 2023 and 2024. The 2025 sequel De Tatta's 3 won the Golden Film award after having sold 100,000 tickets.

Leo Alkemade, Leonie ter Braak and Sterre Koning play a role in the film. Principal photography began in May 2023.

== See also ==
- De Tatta's
