= De Tatta's 3 =

2025 Dutch film directed by Jamel Aattache

- Directed by: Jamel Aattache
- Starring: Leo Alkemade; Elisa Beuger; Sterre Koning; Sem van der Horst; John Buijsman
- Distributed by: Independent Films
- Release date: 11 December 2025
- Country: Netherlands
- Language: Dutch

De Tatta's 3 (Dutch for: The Tattas 3) is a 2025 Dutch comedy film directed by Jamel Aattache. The film won the Golden Film award after having sold 100,000 tickets. It is the sequel to the 2023 film De Tatta's 2 which is also directed by Jamel Aattache.

Leo Alkemade, Elisa Beuger and Sterre Koning play roles in the film. Najib Amhali also plays a role in the film. The film finished in 7th place in the list of best visited Dutch films of 2025. Just over 183,000 tickets were sold in 2025 and just over 279,000 tickets in total, including tickets sold in 2026.

A spin-off film of De Tatta's film series titled De Tatta's: Daan premiered in October 2026. The story of the film is focused on the character Daan van Kempen played by Sem van der Horst.
