= Het Onbekende =

2023 Dutch television show

- Presented by: Renze Klamer
- Country of origin: Netherlands
- Original language: Dutch
- No. of seasons: 2

Original release
- Network: RTL 4
- Release: 12 May 2023 – 19 December 2024

Het Onbekende (Dutch for: The Unknown) is a 2023 Dutch adventure television show presented by Renze Klamer. In show, two teams go on a competitive adventure in Slovenia. The second season of the show took place in Bulgaria and aired in 2024.

Contestants agree to take part with everything being unknown: they are not told anything about the show, the rules of the game or the date and time when the show would begin. One team consists of well-known Dutch people and the other team consists of unknown Dutch people. Pia Douwes, Ronald Mulder and Freek Bartels are among the well-known Dutch people taking part.

The format of the show was sold to Belgium, France and Italy. In the latest country, the first season has been shot in 2025 in Calabria and aired on Rai 2 a year later.
