= Westbeemster =

- Town
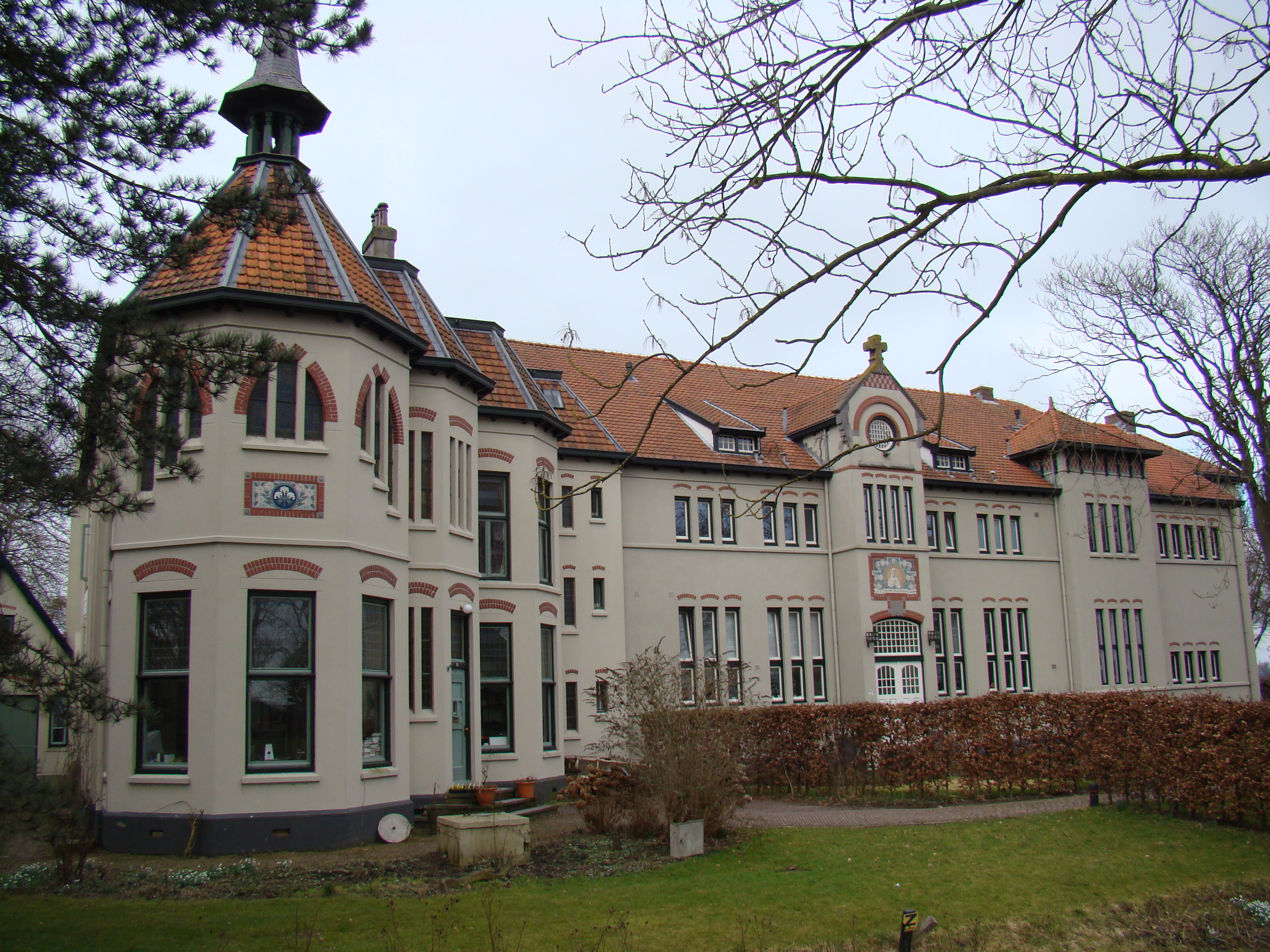
- Lourdesschool

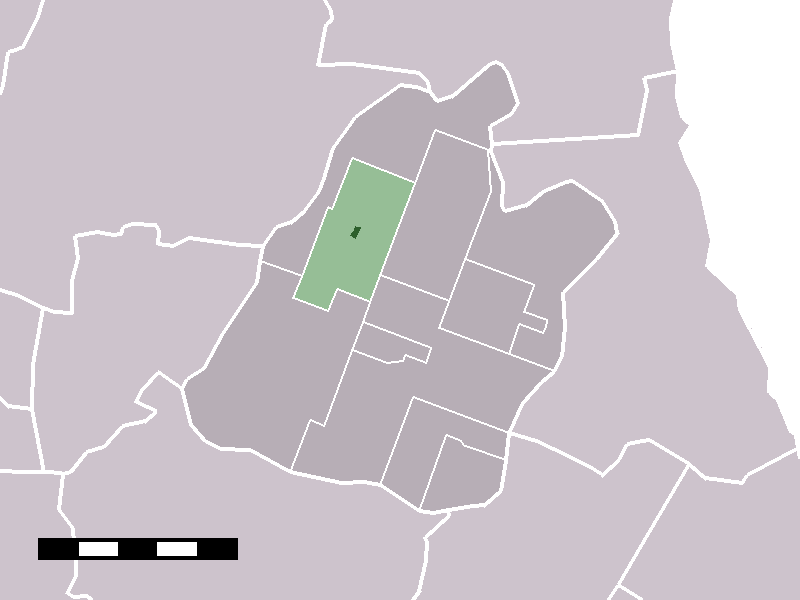
- The town centre (dark green) and the statistical district (light green) of Westbeemster in the former municipality of Beemster.

- Location in the Netherlands
- Coordinates: 52°34′28″N 4°53′55″E
- Country: Netherlands
- Province: North Holland
- Municipality: Purmerend

Population (3 October 2025)
  - Total: 775
- Time zone: UTC+1 (CET)
  - Summer (DST): UTC+2 (CEST)

Westbeemster is a town in the Dutch province of North Holland. It is a part of the former municipality of Beemster, and lies about 9 km northwest of Purmerend. Since 2022 it has been part of the municipality of Purmerend.

In 2001, the town of Westbeemster had 117 inhabitants. The built-up area of the town was 0.04 km², and contained 40 residences. The larger statistical district "Westbeemster" has a population of around 775.
