= Rokjesnacht =

2024 Dutch film directed by Johan Nijenhuis

- Theatrical release poster
- Directed by: Johan Nijenhuis
- Written by: Allard Blom
- Produced by: Johan Nijenhuis; Ingmar Menning
- Cinematography: Maarten van Keller
- Edited by: Elsbeth Kasteel; Bas Icke
- Music by: Ronald Schilperoort
- Production companies: Johan Nijenhuis & Co.
- Distributed by: Splendid Film
- Release date: 28 September 2024
- Country: Netherlands
- Language: Dutch

Rokjesnacht is a 2024 Dutch romantic comedy film directed by Johan Nijenhuis.

The film is based on the musical Blind Date. The title song of the film Zin in het leven is sung by Simon Keizer. Lykele Muus, Leo Alkemade and Abbey Hoes play roles in the film. Brigitte Heitzer, Juultje Tielemans and Tineke Schouten also play roles in the film. The film was Tineke Schouten's acting debut. The film finished in 22nd place in the list of best visited Dutch films of 2024.

Principal photography began in March 2024.
