= Amstelhoek =

Amstelhoek Mennonietenbuurt
- Village
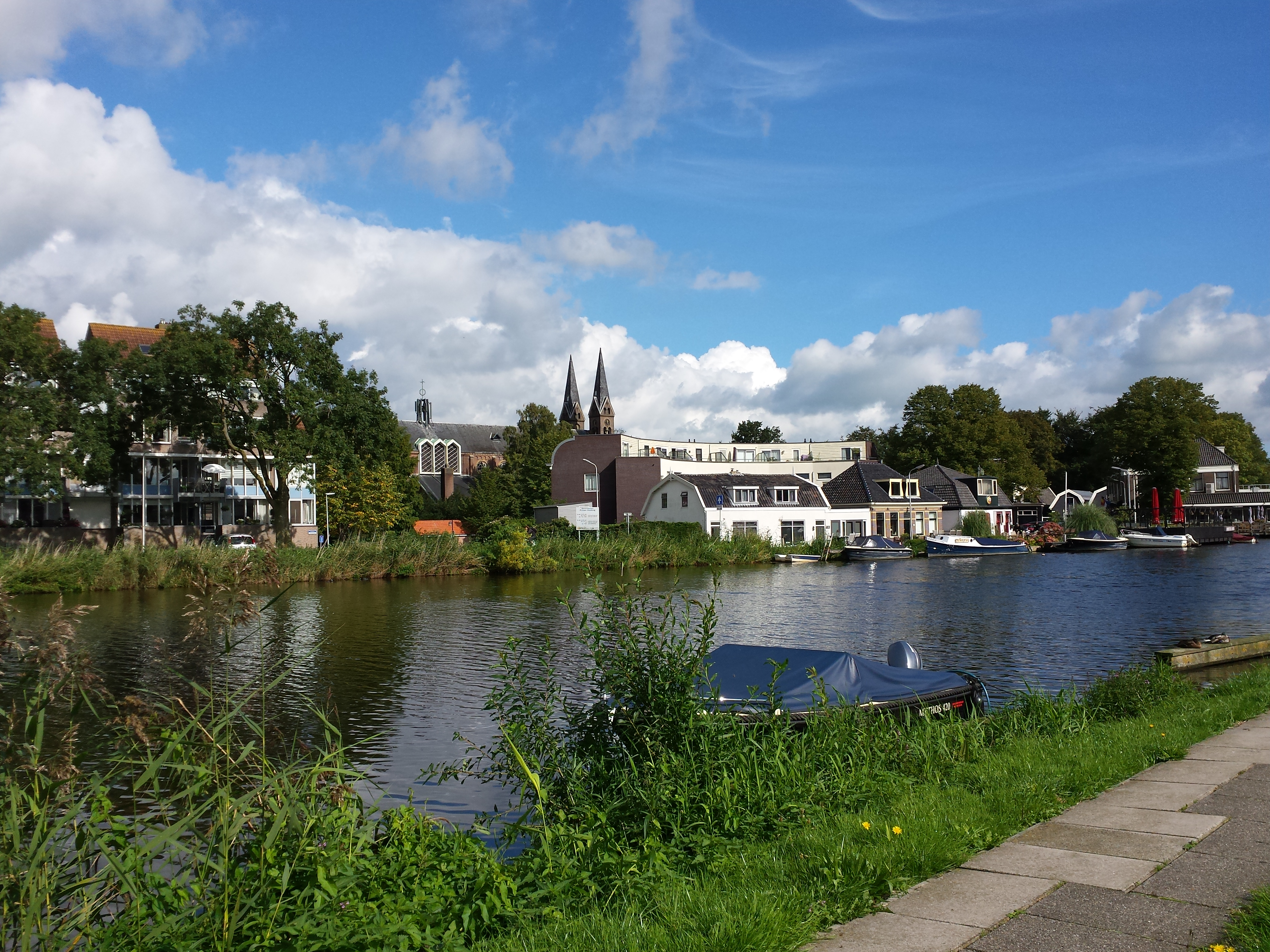
- Amstelhoek in 2015

- Location in the Netherlands Amstelhoek (Netherlands)
- Coordinates: 52°13′52″N 4°50′6″E
- Country: Netherlands
- Province: Utrecht
- Municipality: De Ronde Venen

Area
  - Total: 0.95 km^{2} (0.37 sq mi)
- Elevation: −1.0 m (−3.3 ft)

Population (2021)
  - Total: 985
  - Density: 1,000/km^{2} (2,700/sq mi)
- Time zone: UTC+1 (CET)
  - Summer (DST): UTC+2 (CEST)
- Postal code: 1427
- Dialing code: 0297

Amstelhoek is a village in the Dutch province of Utrecht. It is in the municipality of De Ronde Venen, about 3 km (1.9 mi) northwest of Mijdrecht. Amstelhoek lies on the river Amstel, directly across from Uithoorn.

It was first mentioned in 1936 as Amstelhoek, and means "corner of the Amstel river". It was named after the fortress. The village developed around a bridge built in 1636, and used to be named Mennonietenbuurt, meaning Mennonite corner, because a Mennonite church was built in the hamlet. The Mennonites left around 1800, and sold the land and church to the Protestants in 1804. The village was home to 187 people in 1840. Between 1885 and 1895, two big forts were built near the village as part of the Stelling van Amsterdam. One of the forts was named Fort bij Amstelhoek.

== Gallery ==
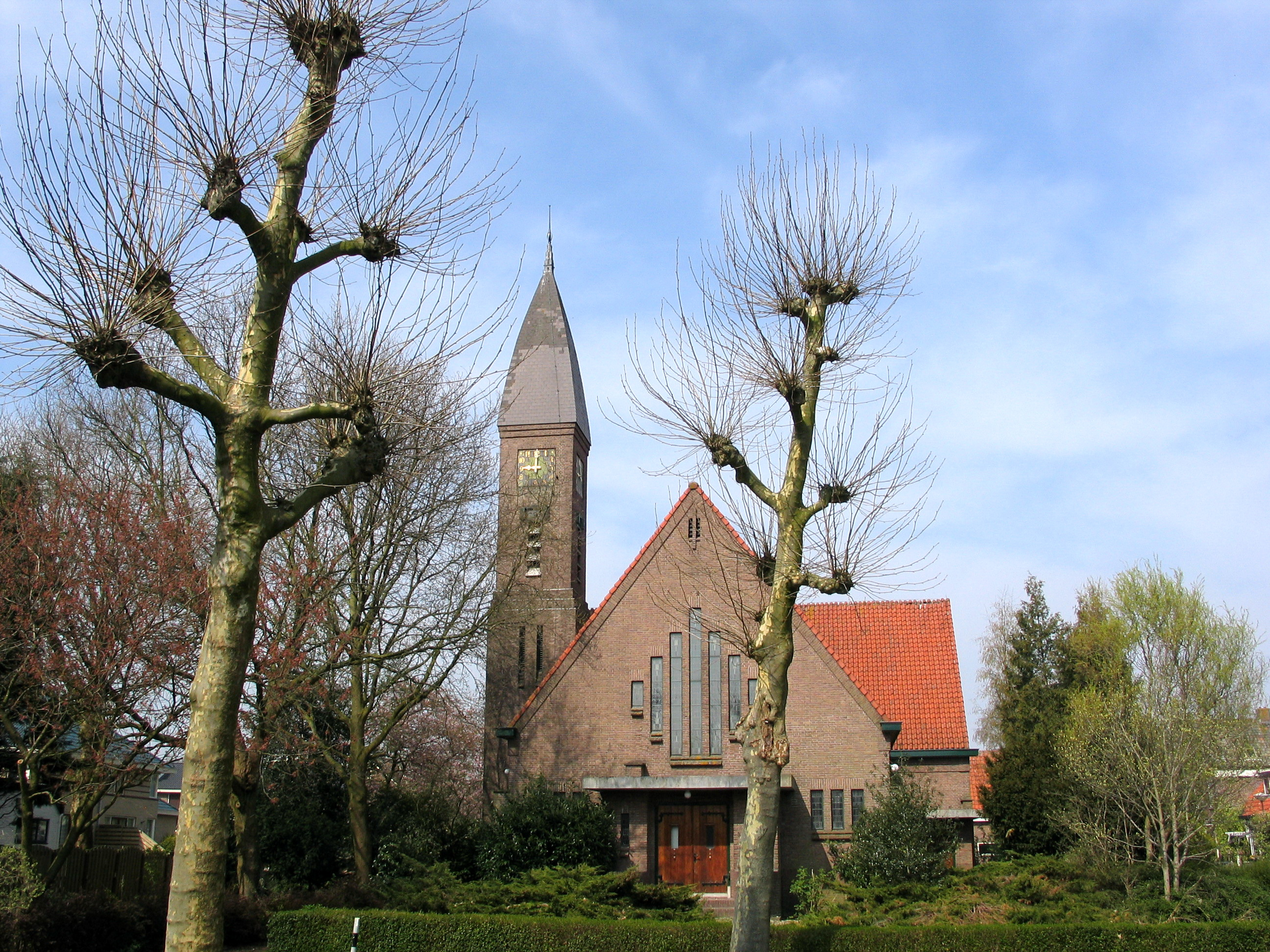
Church of Amstelhoek

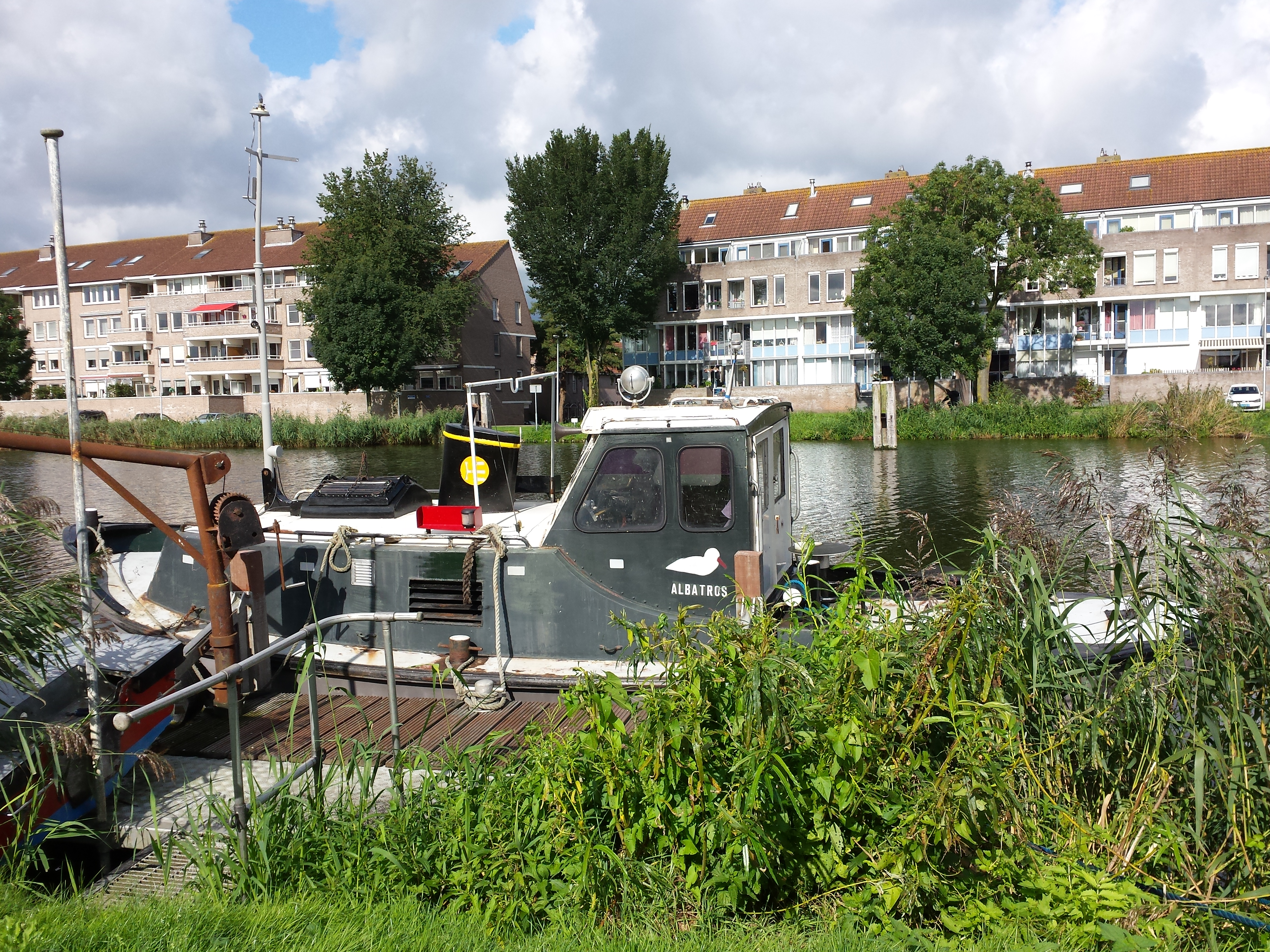
River view

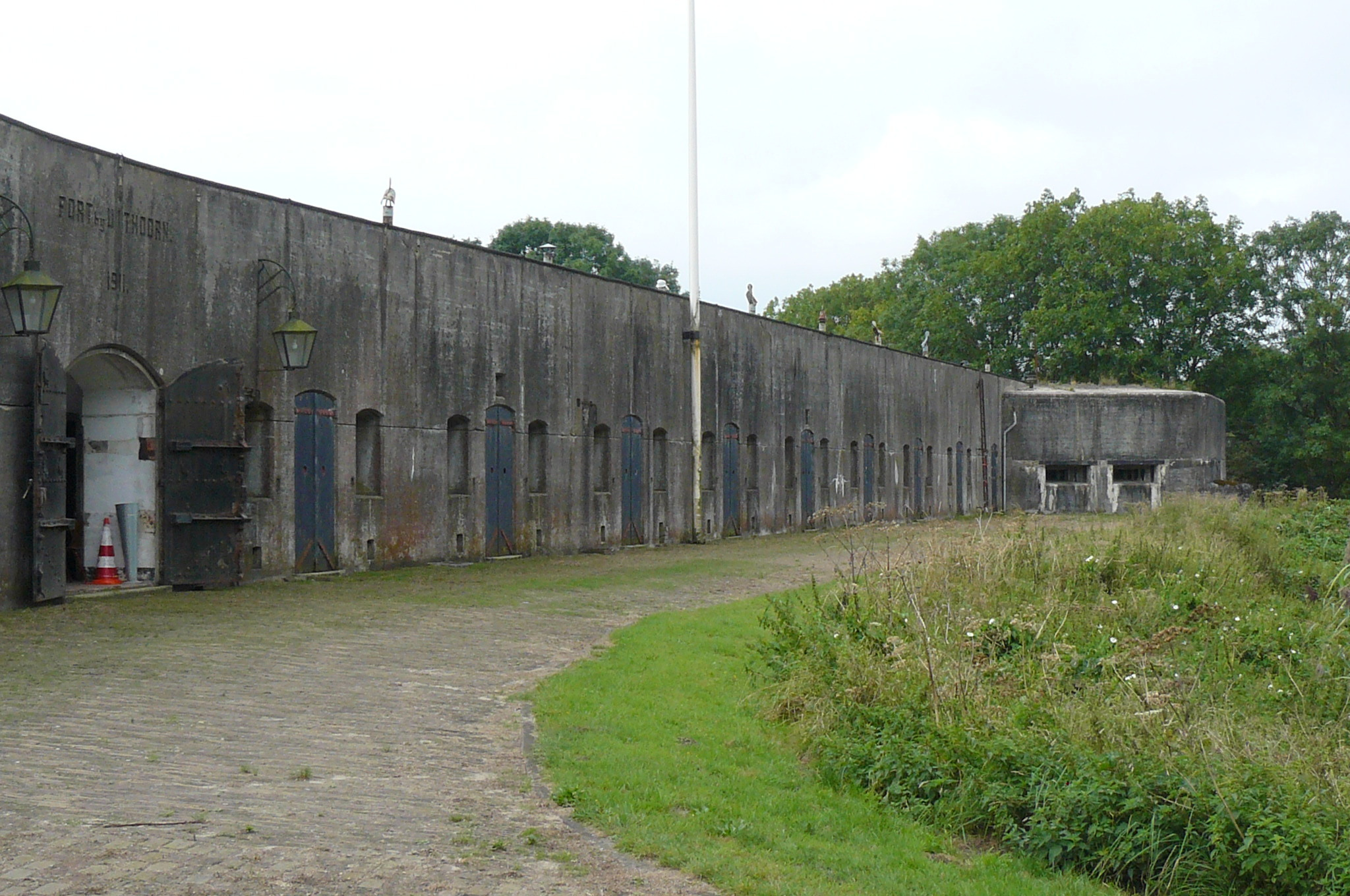
Barracks of the fort
