= De Tatta's: Daan =

2026 Dutch film

- Directed by: Jamel Aattache; Lars Zijm
- Starring: Sem van der Horst; Leo Alkemade; Elisa Beuger; Sterre Koning; John Buijsman
- Distributed by: Independent Films
- Release date: 8 October 2026
- Running time: 80 minutes
- Country: Netherlands
- Language: Dutch

De Tatta's: Daan (Dutch for: The Tattas: Daan) is a 2026 Dutch comedy film directed by Jamel Aattache and Lars Zijm. The film won the Golden Film award after having sold 100,000 tickets. It is a spin-off film of the De Tatta's film series. The story of the film is focused on the character Daan van Kempen played by Sem van der Horst.
