= Harskamp =

- Village
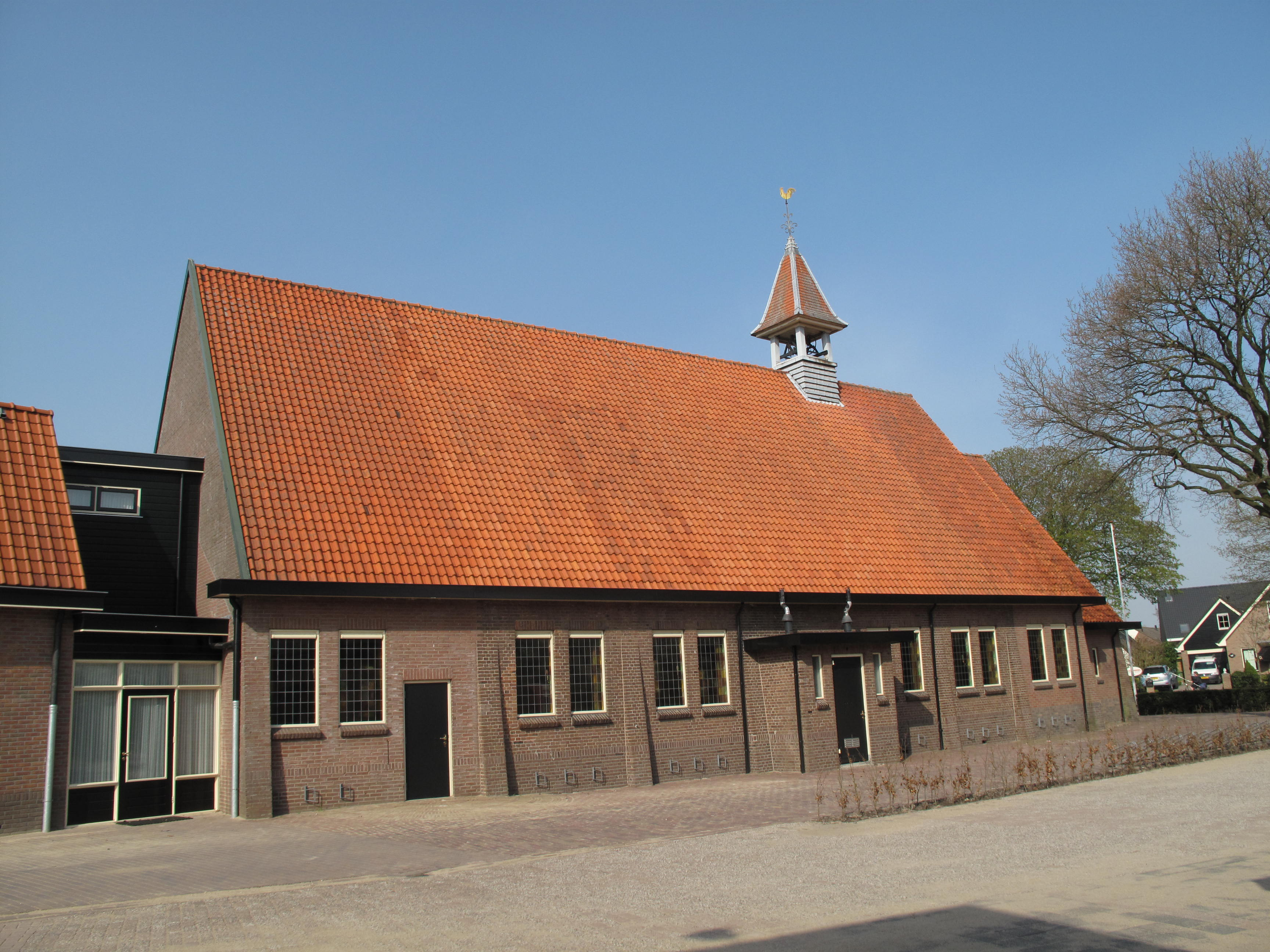
- Church in Harskmap

- Location in the Netherlands Harskamp (Netherlands)
- Coordinates: 52°08′N 5°45′E
- Country: Netherlands
- Province: Gelderland
- Municipality: Ede

Area
  - Total: 35.72 km^{2} (13.79 sq mi)
- Elevation: 24 m (79 ft)

Population (2021)
  - Total: 3,545
  - Density: 99.24/km^{2} (257.0/sq mi)
- Time zone: UTC+1 (CET)
  - Summer (DST): UTC+2 (CEST)
- Postal code: 6732
- Dialing code: 0318

Harskamp is a village in the municipality of Ede in the province of Gelderland, the Netherlands.

It was first mentioned in 1333 as Hoerscampe, and means "horse camp". In 1840, it was home to 268 people. In 1896, a shooting range was built in the village which turned in to the military base Harskamp. The Rehoboth Church was built in 1928.

== Points of interest ==
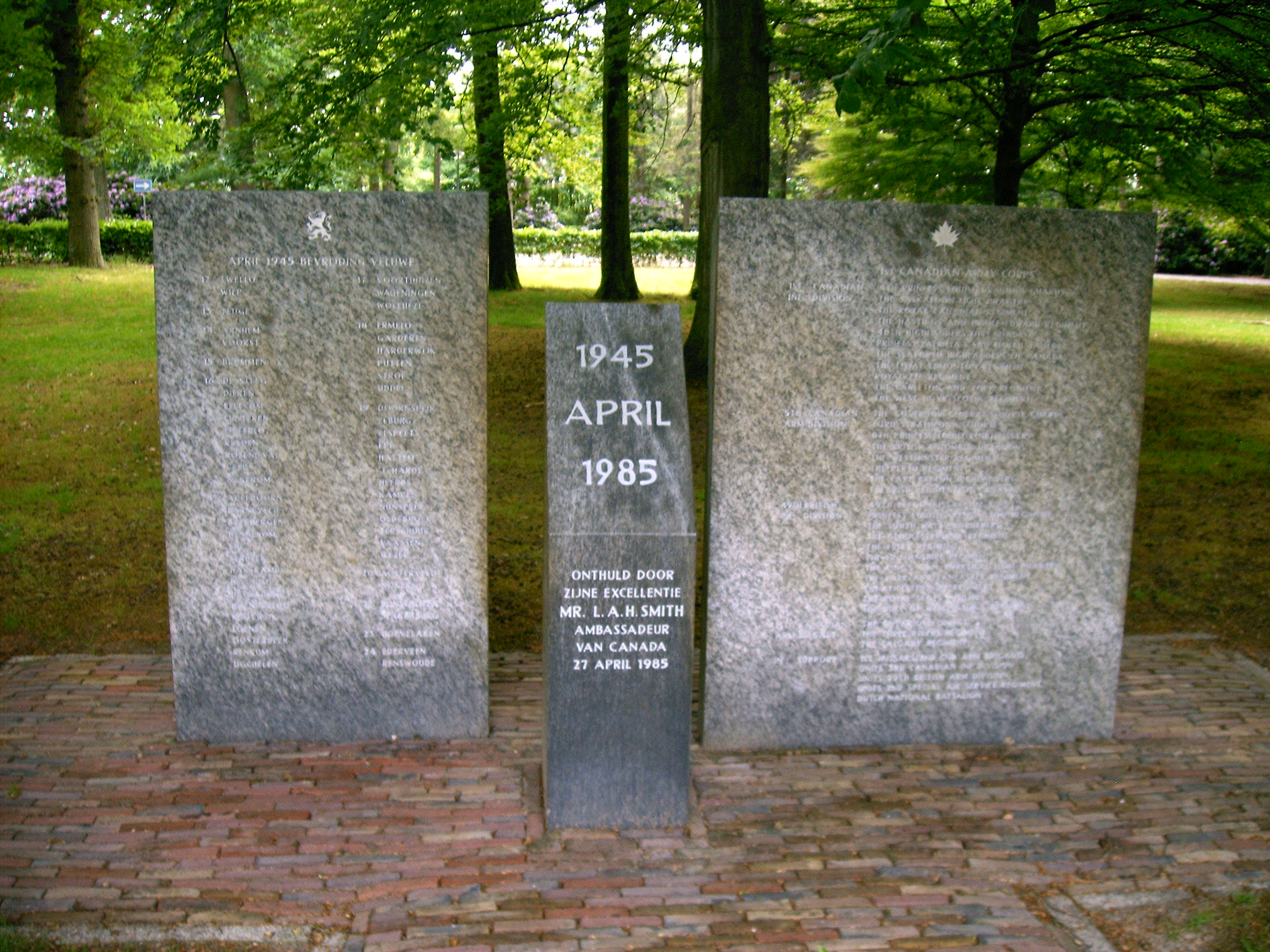
WW2 Liberation Monument (by Canadians), 1945

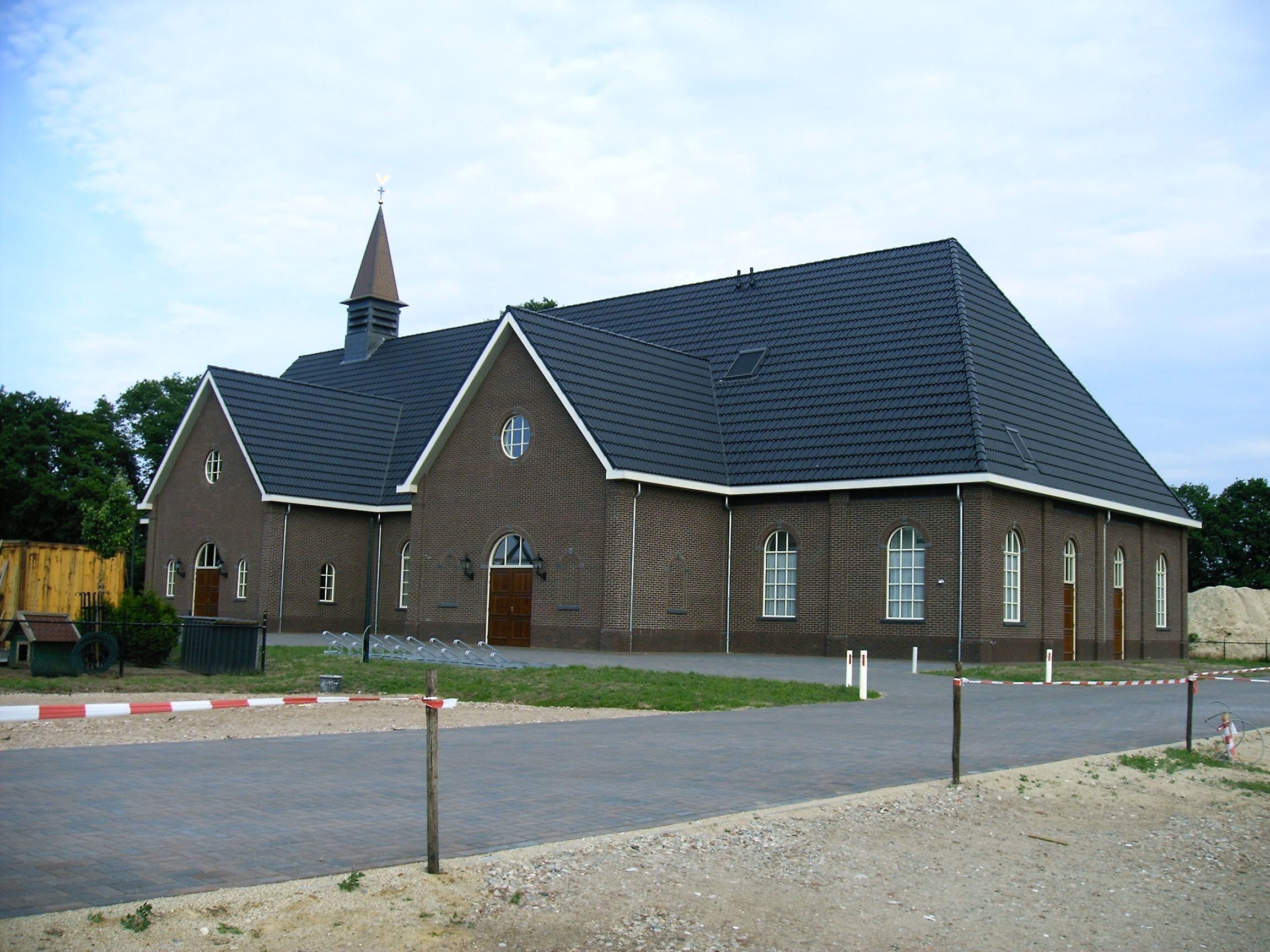
Another Church

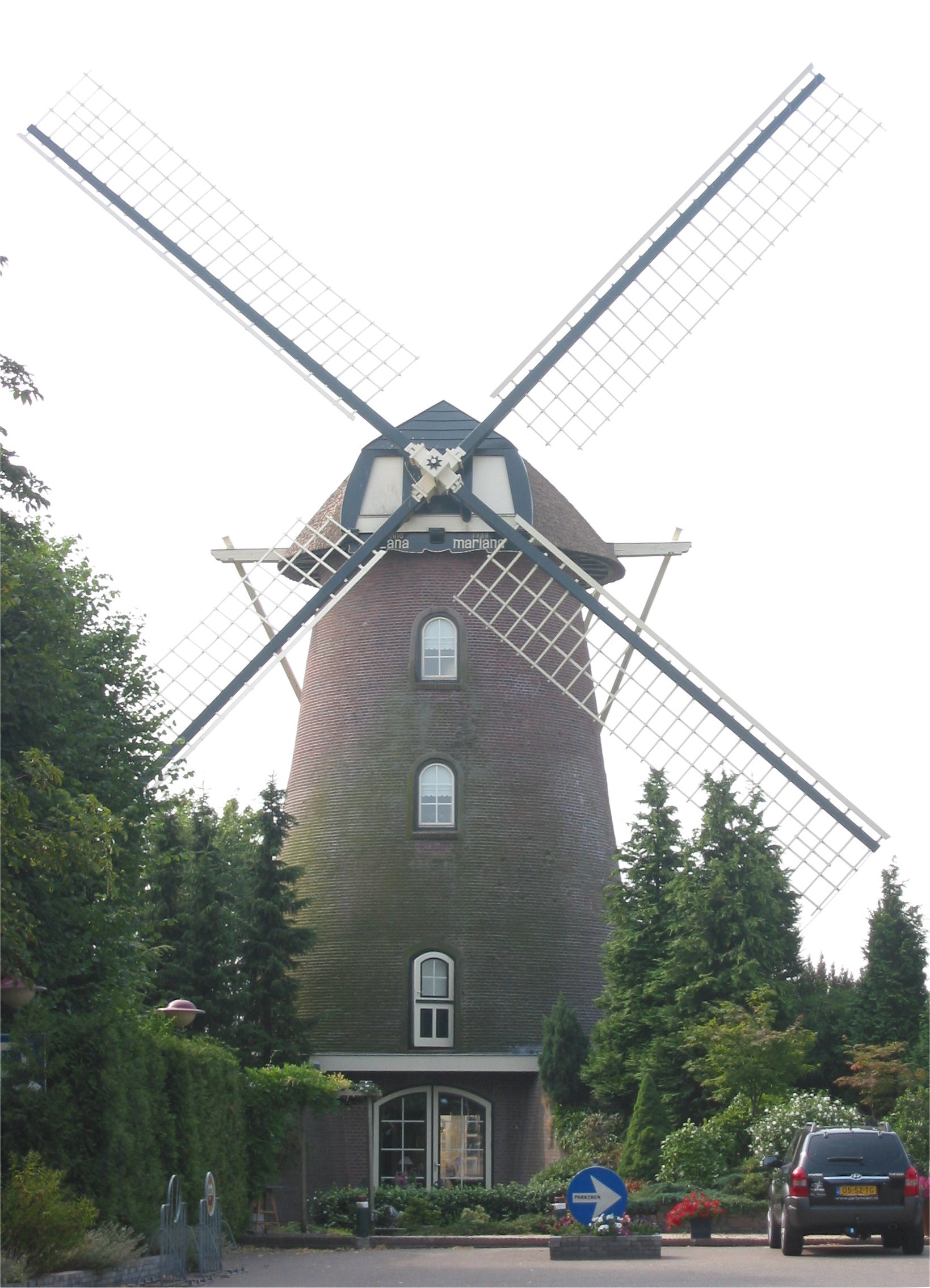
Windmill Lana Mariana
