= Beau van Erven Dorens =

Dutch television presenter, actor, and voice talent (born 1970)

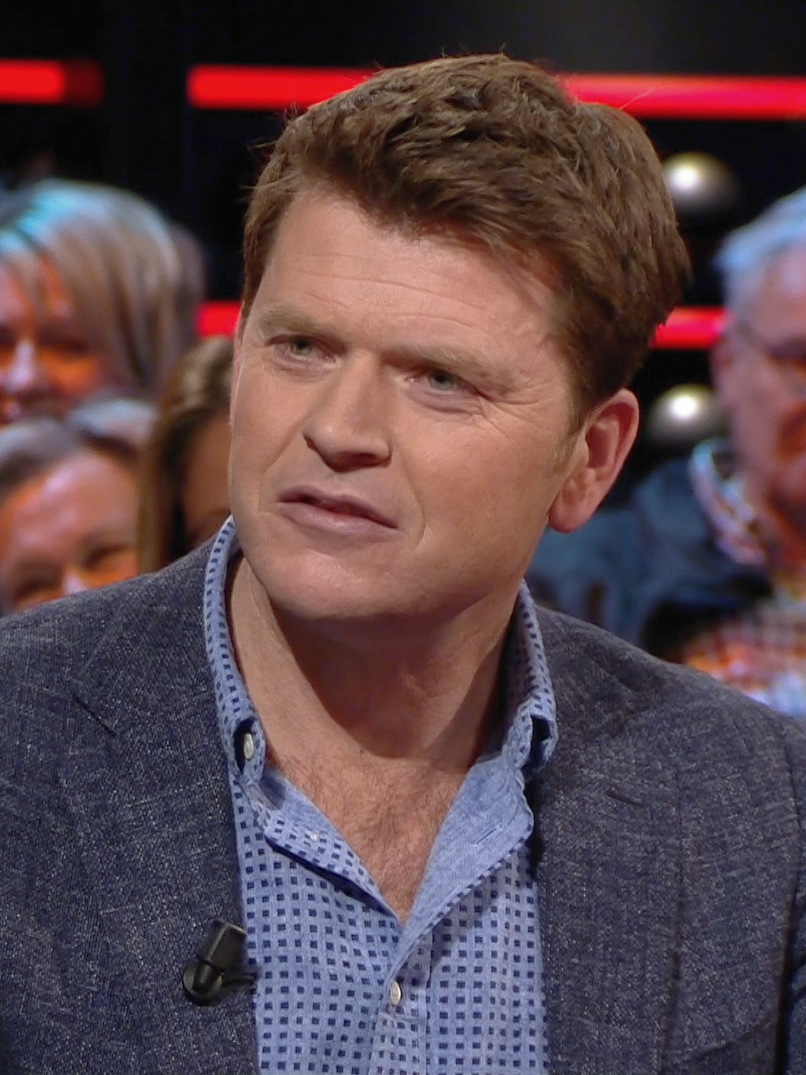
- van Erven Dorens in 2018
- Born: Beau Noël van Erven Dorens; 24 December 1970 (age 55); Haarlem, Netherlands

Beau van Erven Dorens (Haarlem, 24 December 1970) is a Dutch television presenter, actor and voice actor. He is known for presenting many television programs, including the talk show Beau and the interview show Casa di Beau. He also presented Deal or No Deal, RTL Boulevard, Het Zesde Zintuig and Beau Five Days Inside.

== Career ==
Van Erven Dorens played roles in episodes of several television series, including Goede tijden, slechte tijden (in 1997), Gooische vrouwen (in 2005 and 2006), Dokter Tinus (in 2013) and Bagels & Bubbels (in 2015). In 2001, he played the role of Fraser in the film I Love You Too. The film was a success at the box office and became the first film to receive the Golden Film award, which is awarded to films from the Netherlands once they have sold 100,000 tickets (75,000 tickets at the time).

In 2008 and 2009, he starred as team captain in the television game show Ik hou van Holland for three seasons. He also appeared as contestant on the show in 2012 and 2015.

In 2009, he presented Hole in the wall, the Dutch adaptation of the Japanese television show Brain Wall, together with Gerard Joling. From August 2009 till April 2010 he was also one of the presenters of the Dutch adaptation of the Argentine television show Caiga Quien Caiga (CQC). He presented the show alongside Pieter Jouke and Daan Nieber. Unlike adaptations in many other countries, the Dutch adaptation of CQC was not very successful. In 2010, he also presented De Zaterdagavondshow met Marc-Marie & Beau (Dutch for The Saturday Night Show with Marc-Marie & Beau) with Marc-Marie Huijbregts which also wasn't very successful; only four episodes were broadcast. The year was further marked by the death of his friend Antonie Kamerling who committed suicide at the age of 44.

Van Erven Dorens was the narrator in the 2014 edition of The Passion, a Dutch Passion Play held every Maundy Thursday since 2011. Van Erven Dorens and Jeroen van Koningsbrugge presented the 2016 edition of De Nationale IQ Test.

In 2018, Van Erven Dorens won the Gouden Televizier-Ring award for the television show Beau Five Days Inside. That year he also won the Zilveren Televizier-Ster for best presenter. In 2019, he won the Televizier-Ster award for best presenter.

In 2019, he presented the television show De Sleutel ('The Key'). In the show, he shares the stories of several homeless people and he offers them a place to live. He also started presenting his own talk show Beau which is the successor of the previous late night talk show RTL Late Night. He alternated every four months with Eva Jinek and she presented her talk show Jinek. He stopped presenting the show Beau Five Days Inside to focus on the talk show Beau and the show was renamed to Five Days Inside with Caroline Tensen, Angela Groothuizen and Natasja Froger as presenters. In 2019, he also appeared in one episode of De TV kantine playing the character of BeaulaLinda in a parody of RuPaul's Drag Race.

In 2021, he presented Beau in Floradorp in which he followed the lives of people living in Floradorp, Amsterdam, Netherlands.

He appears in the Videoland series Hockeyvaders. Van Erven Dorens is also a co-creator of the series.

In November and December 2022, Van Erven Dorens presented the show Isola di Beau in which he interviewed two guests in Sardinia, Italy. The show is the successor to the show Lago di Beau which also aired in 2022. Since 2023, he presents the show Casa di Beau in which he also interviews multiple guests in each episode.

From August 2025 to May 2026, he was one of the presenters of the talk show RTL Tonight. The show struggled with low viewing figures from the start and the last episode aired in June 2026. In 2026, he presented the game show The Box in which contestants begin the show in a box located somewhere in the Netherlands.

In 2026, he became one of the presenters of the ninth season of the show Kopen Zonder Kijken after Martijn Krabbé was no longer able to present the show due to his health. Krabbé did the voice-over and the show was presented by multiple presenters. In the show, people purchase a home without having seen it first and the team of Kopen Zonder Kijken makes all relevant decisions based on budget and preferences.

As of September 2026, he is scheduled to present a new season of the show Het Zesde Zintuig, a show about clairvoyance, mediumship and paranormal abilities. He also presented this show in 2008 and 2009.

== Filmography ==
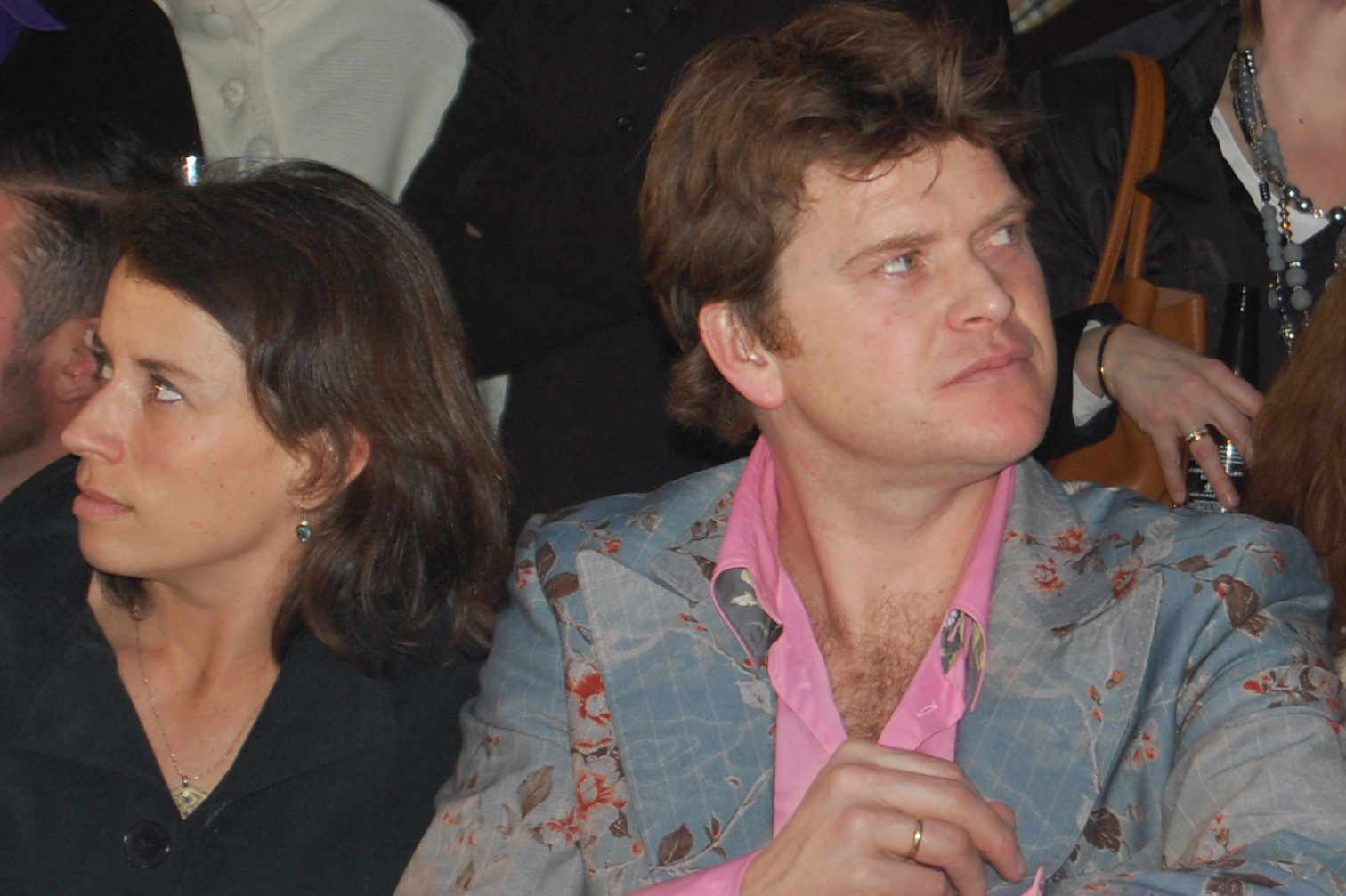
van Erven Dorens with his wife in 2009

=== As presenter ===
- Deal or No Deal (2006–2009)
- Het Zesde Zintuig (2008–2009)
- Caiga Quien Caiga (2009, 2010)
- De Zaterdagavondshow met Marc-Marie & Beau (2010)
- Het Beste Idee van Nederland (2011)
- De Nationale IQ Test (2016)
- 5 jaar later (2018)
- Beau Five Days Inside (2018, 2019)
- De Sleutel (2019)
- Beau (2019–2025)
- Weet Ik Veel (2020–present)
- Beau Blijft Binnen (2020)
- Beau in Floradorp (2021)
- Lago di Beau (2022)
- Isola di Beau (2022)
- Casa di Beau (2023–present)
- Beau op Zondag (2025)
- The Summit (2025)
- RTL Tonight (2025–2026)
- Kopen Zonder Kijken (2026)
- The Box (2026)
- Het Zesde Zintuig (2027, upcoming)

=== As contestant ===
- Ik hou van Holland (2012, 2015)
- Weet Ik Veel (2013)

=== As actor ===
- Goede tijden, slechte tijden (1997)
- I Love You Too (2001)
- Love Trap (2004)
- Gooische vrouwen (2005, 2006)
- Man & Paard (2006)
- De TV kantine (episode, 2019)
- Hockeyvaders (Videoland, 2023)
