= Herman Finkers =

Dutch comedian

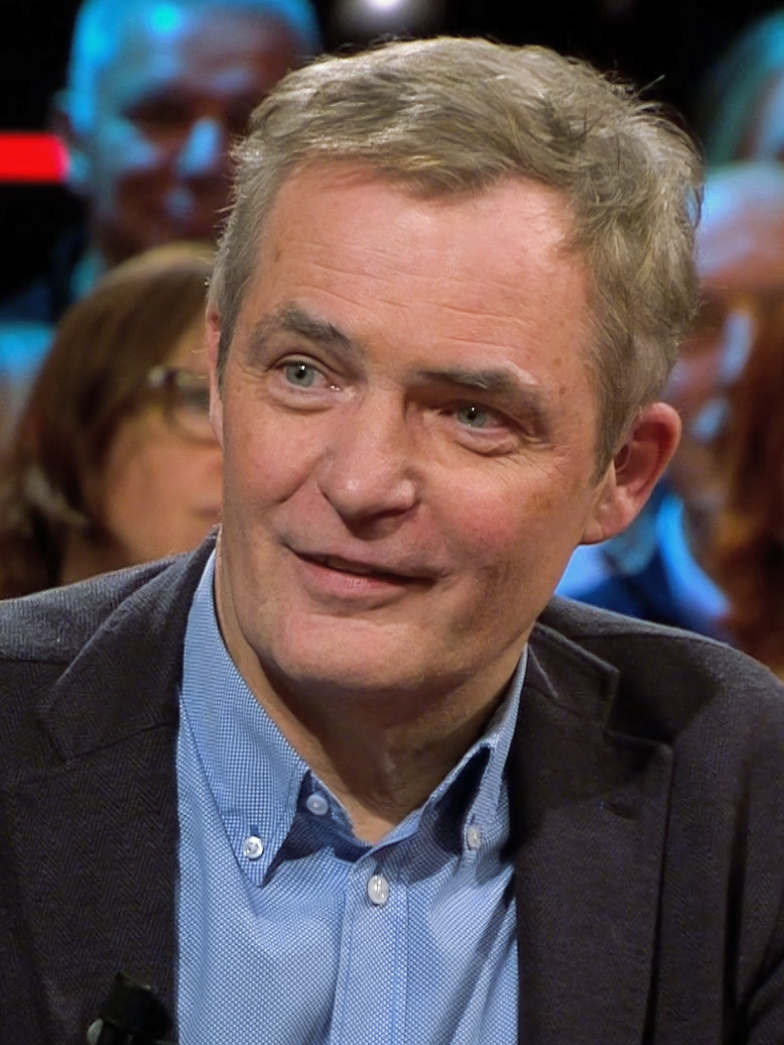
- Herman Finkers (interviewed in De Wereld Draait Door, 2018)
- Born: Hermenegildus Felix Victor Maria Finkers; December 9, 1954 (age 71); Almelo, Overijssel, Netherlands

Comedy career
- Years active: 1979–2000; 2007–present
- Medium: Stand-up, television
- Website: hermanfinkers.nl

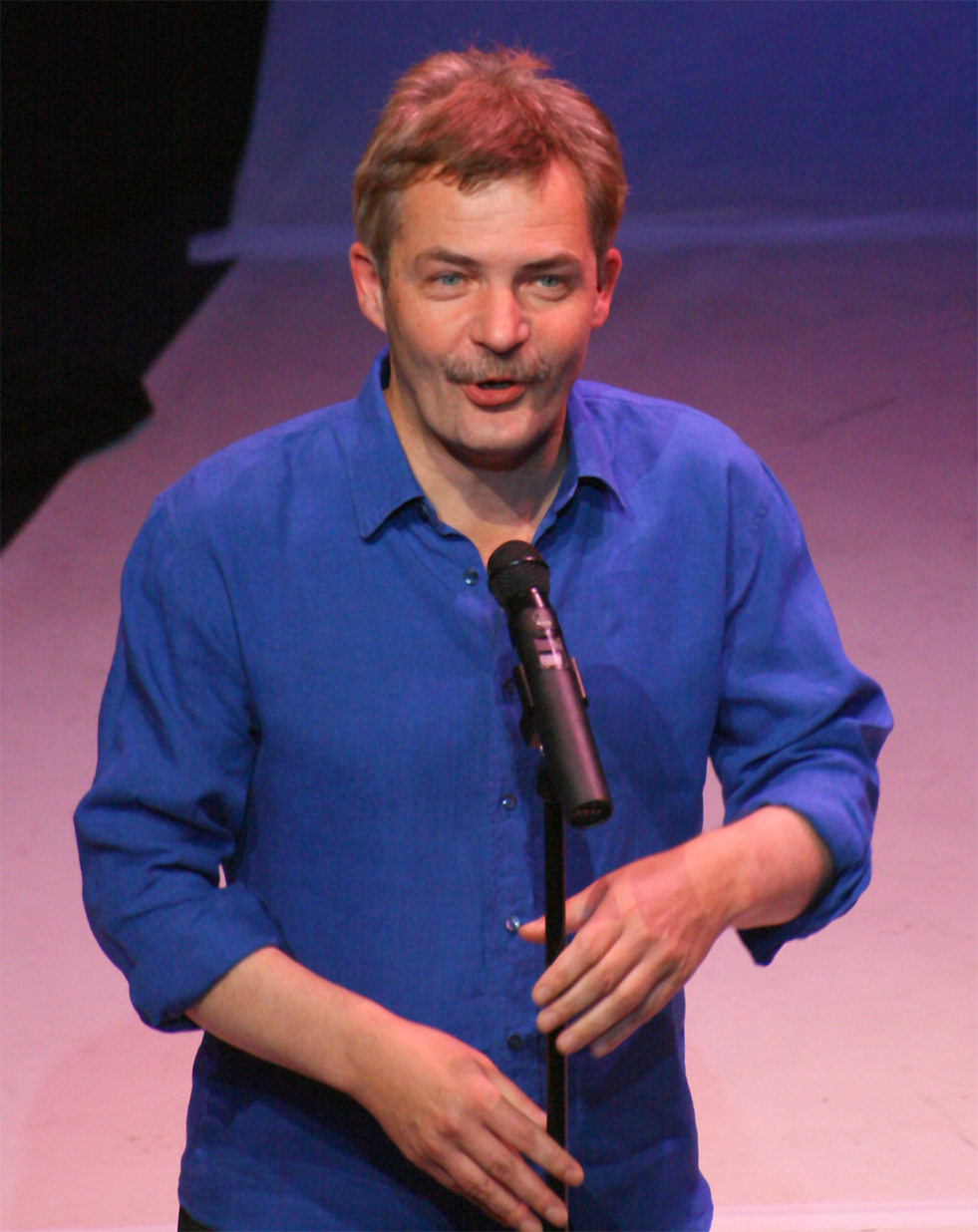
Herman Finkers performing in 2007

Hermenegildus Felix Victor Maria "Herman" Finkers (IPA: [ɦɛrmeːnəˈɣɪldʏs ˈfeːlɪks ˈfɪktɔr maːˈrijaː ˈɦɛrmɑɱ ˈfɪŋkərs]; born December 9, 1954) is a Dutch comedian, who is well known in the Netherlands for his friendly, dry-witted humour and his ambiguous style of storytelling. His humour is never at the expense of others, except his brother Wilfried Finkers, who is frequently the target of jokes. Wilfried Finkers co-wrote material and occasionally appeared in his brother's shows.

== Biography ==
Herman Finkers was born in Almelo in 1954 and raised in a Catholic family. Herman's career as a cabaret performer began after his study when he made his stuttering his trademark. His first program was called Op Zwart Zangzaad. In 1979 Herman won multiple prizes at the Delftse Cameretten festival. He temporarily stopped performing in 2000 due to a lack of inspiration and motivation. Soon afterwards he was diagnosed with a form of leukaemia. He was given an estimate of 10 to 15 years of life left.

On August 5, 2006, a fuchsia was named after him.

In 2007 he started playing in theaters again, with a show called Na de Pauze (After the Break). On December 31, 2015, he gave the traditional New Year's Eve performance ("Oudejaarsconference") on Dutch television, which was viewed by three million people.

In 2020, he played the lead role in the film The Marriage Escape. The film won the Golden Film award after having sold 100,000 tickets and the film also won the Platinum Film award after having sold 400,000 tickets. In September 2021, Finkers received the Zilveren Krulstaart award for best screenplay of a 2020 Dutch film.

Finkers is a Catholic.

== Tweants ==
Finkers has a strong love for the Tweants dialect. He has translated a number of his shows into Tweants Low Saxon, which is his mother tongue. He also wrote and directed two short animation films, which were completely in Tweants: Kroamschudd'n in Mariaparochie (Baby shower in Mary's Parish, which tells the story of the birth of Christ in a setting of Twente) and his comic interpretation of William Shakespeare's Macbeth. After his retirement from theater, Finkers played a role in the first soap series in Tweants: Van Jonge Leu en Oale Groond (Of Young People and Old Ground). For his efforts to promote the Tweants dialect he received the Johanna van Buuren prize.

== Theater performances ==
- De terugkeer van Joop Huizinga (Joop Huizinga's Return) (1982)
- De Diana Ros Show (The Diana Ros Show) (1983)
- EHBO is mijn lust en mijn leven (First aid is the love of my life) (1985)
- Het Meisje van de Slijterij (The liquor store girl) (1987)
- De zon gaat zinloos onder, morgen moet zij toch weer op (The sun sets pointlessly, it has got to rise again tomorrow anyway) (1990)
- Dat heeft zo'n jongen toch niet nodig (A guy like him doesn't need that) (1992)
- Geen spatader veranderd (Not changed one bit, actually an untranslatable pun, closest in meaning Not changed one dotmatrix) (1995) (also in Tweants: Gen spatoader aans)
- Kalm aan en rap een beetje (Take it easy, on the double) (1998) (also in Tweants: Heanig an en rap wat)
- Na de pauze (After the break) (2007)
- Oudejaarsconference 2015 (New Year's Eve Performance 2015) (2015)

== Discography ==
- Van zijn LP (From his LP)
- EHBO is mijn lust en mijn leven (First aid is the love of my life) (1987)
- Het meisje van de slijterij (The liquor store girl) (1989)
- Als gezonde jongen zijnde (As a healthy boy) (1990)
- De zon gaat zinloos onder, morgen moet zij toch weer op (The sun sets pointlessly, she's got to get up tomorrow anyway) (1992)
- Dat heeft zo'n jongen toch niet nodig (A boy like that doesn't need that) (1994)
- Geen spatader veranderd (Not changed one bit) (1997)
- Zijn minst beroerde liedjes (His least bad songs) (1999)
- Liever dan geluk (2010)
- Koo Wit De Floo In Almelo (2015)
- Vot Met Den Pröttel (2022)

== DVDs ==
- EHBO is mijn lust en mijn leven
- Het meisje van de slijterij
- De zon gaat zinloos onder, morgen moet zij toch weer op
- Carnaval der Dieren / Sint Joris Mis (Missa in honorem Sancti Georgii)
- Kroamschudd'n in Mariaparochie / Macbeth (animation films)
- Dat heeft zo'n jongen toch niet nodig
- Geen spatader veranderd
- Kalm aan en rap een beetje
- Een engelhart in Rome
- Tot nu toe (compilation)
- Na de pauze
- Liever dan geluk
- Alle dvd's
- De oudejaarsconference 2015
