= Zwanger & Co =

2022 Dutch film directed by Johan Nijenhuis

- Theatrical release poster
- Directed by: Johan Nijenhuis
- Starring: Lieke van Lexmond; Waldemar Torenstra; Leonie ter Braak
- Music by: Ronald Schilperoort
- Production companies: Johan Nijenhuis & Co
- Distributed by: Dutch FilmWorks
- Release date: 25 June 2022
- Country: Netherlands
- Language: Dutch
- Box office: $1,063,671

Zwanger & Co is a 2022 Dutch romantic comedy film directed by Johan Nijenhuis. The film won the Golden Film award after having sold 100,000 tickets.

Lieke van Lexmond and Waldemar Torenstra play roles in the film. Leonie ter Braak, Imanuelle Grives and Manuel Broekman also play roles in the film.
