= De Jongens tegen de Meisjes =

Dutch television game show

- Genre: Game show
- Presented by: Tijl Beckand; Chantal Janzen; Yolanthe Sneijder-Cabau
- Country of origin: Netherlands
- Original language: Dutch
- No. of seasons: 7
- No. of episodes: 45

Production
- Running time: 50 minutes

Original release
- Network: RTL 4
- Release: 2011 – 2018

De Jongens tegen de Meisjes (Dutch for The Boys versus the Girls) was a Dutch game show broadcast by RTL 4. The show first aired in 2011 and last aired in 2018.

The show featured a male and a female team participating in various games and quizzes about the differences between men and women. Tijl Beckand was the team captain of the male team since the show first aired and Chantal Janzen was the team captain of the female team, also since the beginning, except in 2018 due to her pregnancy. In this year Yolanthe Sneijder-Cabau replaced her as the team captain of the female team.

== Seasons ==
=== Season 1 ===
Episode	Date	Team	Team members		
1	21 May 2011	Team Tijl	John van den Heuvel	Carlo Boszhard	Winston Gerschtanowitz
1	21 May 2011	Team Chantal	Kim-Lian van der Meij	Irene Moors	Renate Verbaan
2	28 May 2011	Team Tijl	Johnny de Mol	Guido Weijers	Bastiaan Ragas
2	28 May 2011	Team Chantal	Sara Kroos	Stacey Rookhuizen	Tooske Ragas
3	4 June 2011	Team Tijl	Dennis Weening	Dennis van der Geest	Sam Gooris
3	4 June 2011	Team Chantal	Nicolette van Dam	Saar Koningsberger	Kelly Pfaff
4	11 June 2011	Team Tijl	Nick Schilder	Simon Keizer	Jos Sloot
4	11 June 2011	Team Chantal	Ellen ten Damme	Katja Schuurman	Dycke van der Wal
5	18 June 2011	Team Tijl	Leco van Zadelhoff	Rick Brandsteder	Jim Bakkum
5	18 June 2011	Team Chantal	Estelle Gullit	Quinty Trustfull	Bettina Holwerda
6	25 June 2011	Team Tijl	Wilfred Genee	Huub Stapel	Lange Frans
6	25 June 2011	Team Chantal	Daphne Deckers	Froukje de Both	Daniëlle van Aalderen

=== Season 2 ===
Episode	Date	Team	Team members		
1	21 April 2012	Team Tijl	Jamai Loman	Robert de Hoog	Jeroen Nieuwenhuize
1	21 April 2012	Team Chantal	Georgina Verbaan	Yvonne Coldeweijer	Natasja Froger
2	28 April 2012	Team Tijl	René van Kooten	Thomas Berge	Danny de Munk
2	28 April 2012	Team Chantal	Lieke van Lexmond	Patty Brard	Jenny de Munk
3	5 May 2012	Team Tijl	Ferry Doedens	Koert-Jan de Bruijn	Charly Luske
3	5 May 2012	Team Chantal	Jelka van Houten	Birgit Schuurman	Tanja Jess
4	12 May 2012	Team Tijl	Ruud Feltkamp	Tygo Gernandt	Wolter Kroes
4	12 May 2012	Team Chantal	Mariska van Kolck	Paulien Huizinga	Tessa Kroes
5	19 May 2012	Team Tijl	John Williams	Ruben van der Meer	Frederik Brom
5	19 May 2012	Team Chantal	Babette van Veen	Lisa Lois	Nienke Römer
6	26 May 2012	Team Tijl	Gers Pardoel	Patrick Martens	Guido Spek
6	26 May 2012	Team Chantal	Britt Dekker	Krystl	Anouk Smulders
7	2 June 2012	Team Tijl	Richard Witschge	Pierre van Hooijdonk	Dick Jol
7	2 June 2012	Team Chantal	Sanne Hoogkamer	Estelle Gullit	Winonah de Jong

=== Season 3 ===
Episode	Date	Team	Team members		
1	4 May 2013	Team Tijl	Kees Tol	Dennis van der Geest	Thomas Berge
1	4 May 2013	Team Chantal	Zarayda Groenhart	Inge de Bruijn	Myrthe Mylius
2	11 May 2013	Team Tijl	Gerard Ekdom	Caspar Bürgi	Jaap Reesema
2	11 May 2013	Team Chantal	Patricia Paay	Glennis Grace	Kim Kötter
3	18 May 2013	Team Tijl	Kraantje Pappie	Ernst Daniël Smid	Robert Minderhoud
3	18 May 2013	Team Chantal	Josje Huisman	Rosalie van Breemen	Shana Dolphen
4	25 May 2013	Team Tijl	Mark van Eeuwen	Fred van Leer	Robert Schoemacher
4	25 May 2013	Team Chantal	Marly van der Velden	Fajah Lourens	Claudia Schoemacher
5	1 June 2013	Team Tijl	Sander Janson	Xander de Buisonjé	Michael Mendoza
5	1 June 2013	Team Chantal	Heleen van Royen	Do	Kim Feenstra
6	8 June 2013	Team Tijl	Yes-R	Robert ten Brink	Michael van der Plas
6	8 June 2013	Team Chantal	Sabine Uitslag	Jasmine Sendar	Samantha de Jong
7	15 June 2013	Team Tijl	Dirk Zeelenberg	Bob de Jong	Winston Post
7	15 June 2013	Team Chantal	Nance Coolen	Judith Osborn	Denise van Rijswijk

=== Season 4 ===
Episode	Date	Team	Team members		
1	19 April 2014	Team Tijl	Jeffrey Wammes	Teun Kuilboer	Oren Schrijver
1	19 April 2014	Team Chantal	Tess Milne	Froukje de Both	Céline Purcell
2	26 April 2014	Team Tijl	Eddy Zoëy	Rene Froger	Dré Hazes
2	26 April 2014	Team Chantal	Edith Bosch	Loretta Schrijver	Roxeanne Hazes
3	3 May 2014	Team Tijl	Bas Muijs	Jamai Loman	Andy van der Meijde
3	3 May 2014	Team Chantal	Sharon Doorson	Angela Groothuizen	Melisa Schaufeli
4	10 May 2014	Team Tijl	Beau Schneider	Ramon Beuk	Frans Duijts
4	10 May 2014	Team Chantal	Dyanne Beekman	Quinty Trustfull	Nicolette Kluijver
5	17 May 2014	Team Tijl	William Spaaij	Remy Bonjasky	Mike Weerts
5	17 May 2014	Team Chantal	Ellemieke Vermolen	Liza Sips	Victoria Koblenko
6	24 May 2014	Team Tijl	Roy Donders	Roué Verveer	Maik de Boer
6	24 May 2014	Team Chantal	Gigi Ravelli	Sylvia Geersen	Tatum Dagelet
7	31 May 2014	Team Tijl	Freek Bartels	Frits Sissing	Tim Douwsma
7	31 May 2014	Team Chantal	Zimra Geurts	Euvgenia Parakhina	Monique Smit
8	7 June 2014	Team Tijl	John de Wolf	John van den Brom	Jack Spijkerman
8	7 June 2014	Team Chantal	Olcay Gulsen	Daphne Koster	Barbara Barend

=== Season 5 ===
Episode	Date	Team	Team members		
1	30 May 2015	Team Tijl	Timor Steffens	Ruben Nicolai	Viktor Brand
1	30 May 2015	Team Chantal	Ranomi Kromowidjojo	Lone van Roosendaal	Vivian Slingerland
2	6 June 2015	Team Tijl	Rick Brandsteder	Rico Verhoeven	Jochem van Gelder
2	6 June 2015	Team Chantal	Do	Leona Philippo	Yvonne Coldeweijer
3	13 June 2015	Team Tijl	Pim Wessels	John Williams	Bastiaan Ragas
3	13 June 2015	Team Chantal	Pip Pellens	Esmee van Kampen	Tooske Ragas
4	27 June 2015	Team Tijl	Patrick Martens	Howard Komproe	Dennis Weening
4	27 June 2015	Team Chantal	Patricia Paay	Christina Curry	Nancy Coolen
5	13 May 2017 (Broadcast during season six)	Team Tijl	Manuel Broekman	Géza Weisz	Ferri Somogyi
5	13 May 2017 (Broadcast during season six)	Team Chantal	Estelle Cruijff	Helga van Leur	Anne-Marie Jung

=== Season 6 ===
Episode	Date	Team	Team members		
1	29 April 2017	Team Tijl	Dave Roelvink	Brownie Dutch	Manuel Venderbos
1	29 April 2017	Team Chantal	Kim-Lian	Soundos El Ahmadi	Shelly Sterk
2	6 May 2017	Team Tijl	Martijn Fischer	Jaap Stockmann	Giel de Winter
2	6 May 2017	Team Chantal	Leonie ter Braak	Paulien Huizinga	Daphne Deckers
3	20 May 2017	Team Tijl	Kjeld Nuis	Soy Kroon	Achmed Akkabi
3	20 May 2017	Team Chantal	Gaby Blaaser	Holly Mae Brood	Manon Meijers
4	27 May 2017	Team Tijl	Tim Douwsma	Lange Frans	Buddy Vedder
4	27 May 2017	Team Chantal	Natasja Froger	Amara Onwuka	Robin Martens
5	3 June 2017	Team Tijl	Rick Paul van Mulligen	JayJay Boske	Jim Bakkum
5	3 June 2017	Team Chantal	Sofie van den Enk	Bertie Steur	Bettina Holwerda
6	10 June 2017	Team Tijl	Kaj van der Voort	Ruud Feltkamp	Leco van Zadelhoff
6	10 June 2017	Team Chantal	Toprak Yalçiner	Maan de Steenwinkel	Stijn Fransen

=== Season 7 ===
Episode	Date	Team	Team members		
1	22 April 2018	Team Tijl	Kay Greidanus	Klaas van der Eerden	Michael de Roos
1	22 April 2018	Team Yolanthe	Geraldine Kemper	Imanuelle Grives	Loes Haverkort
2	29 April 2018	Team Tijl	Ferry Doedens	Carlos Platier Luna	Gijs Staverman
2	29 April 2018	Team Yolanthe	Carolien Spoor	Olcay Gulsen	Famke Louise
3	6 May 2018	Team Tijl	Remy Bonjasky	Leo Alkemade	Tommie Christiaan
3	6 May 2018	Team Yolanthe	Nicolette Kluijver	Miljuschka Witzenhausen	Vajen van den Bosch
4	13 May 2018	Team Tijl	Steven Brunswijk	Fred van Leer	Klaas van Kruistum
4	13 May 2018	Team Yolanthe	Maartje van de Wetering	Carolina Dijkhuizen	Eva Koreman
5	20 May 2018	Team Tijl	Jasper Demollin	Domien Verschuuren	Urvin Monte
5	20 May 2018	Team Yolanthe	Marlijn Weerdenburg	Airen Mylene	Britt Scholte
6	27 May 2018	Team Tijl	Janice	Hugo Kennis	Tino Martin
6	27 May 2018	Team Yolanthe	Berget Lewis	Gwen van Poorten	Monica Geuze
