= Buddy Vedder =

Dutch actor and television presenter

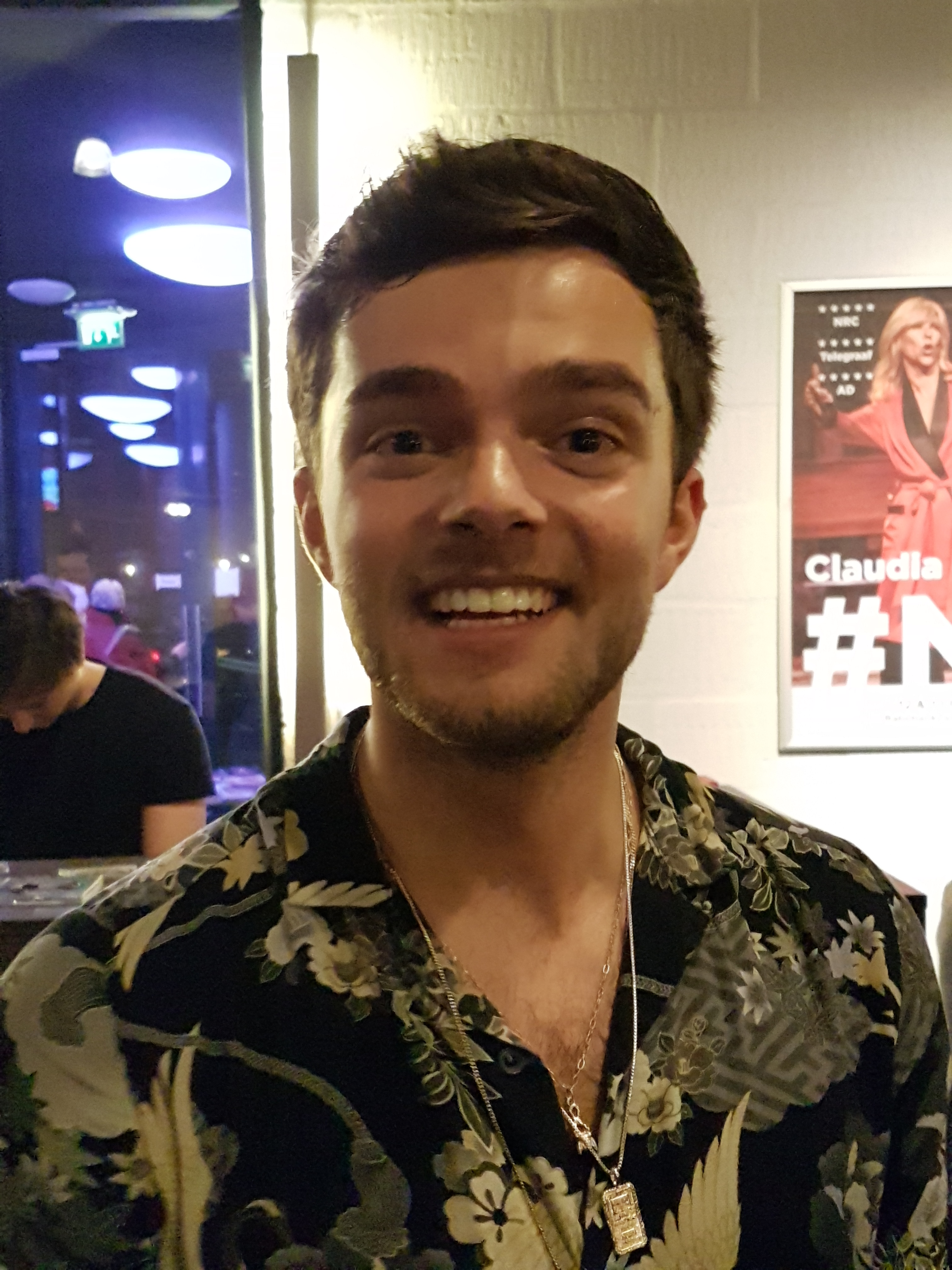
- Vedder in 2020
- Born: 26 August 1994 (age 32); Utrecht, Netherlands
- Occupations: Actor; Television presenter

Buddy Vedder (born 26 August 1994) is a Dutch actor and television presenter. He is known for playing the role of Rover Dekker in the soap opera Goede tijden, slechte tijden. He played lead roles in the musicals Murder Ballad (2020), Saturday Night Fever (2024–2025) and Soldier of Orange (Soldaat van Oranje, 2026). Vedder is also a jury member in the television show The Masked Singer.

== Career ==
Vedder presented the Kids Top 20 television show from 2015 to 2018. He played the role of Rover Dekker from 2015 to 2017 in the soap opera Goede tijden, slechte tijden. He left the show to focus on presenting television shows.

Vedder won the award for Beste Zapp-presentator at the 2017 Zapp Awards. He also won the award for Beste Jeugdpresentator at the 2018 Zapp Awards and 2019 Zapp Awards. In 2018, he presented the Kinderprinsengrachtconcert held on the same day as the Prinsengrachtconcert.

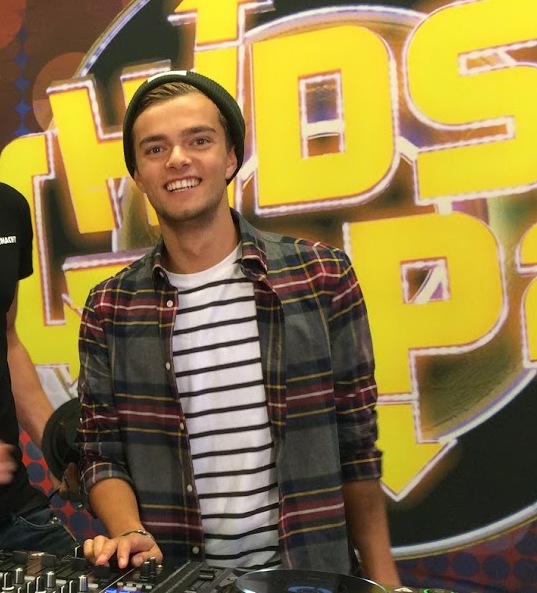
Buddy Vedder on the set of the Zapp Kids Top 20

In 2019, he presented the show Te leuk om waar te zijn with Britt Dekker and Donnie as team captains. In the show, two teams need to decide which short videos are real and which are fake. In the same year, he became a jury member in the television show The Masked Singer. Vedder played a lead role in the musical Murder Ballad in 2020. He won the Favoriete Ster Jeugdprogramma award at the 2020 Zapp Awards. He played a role in the 2020 film Misfit 3: De Finale directed by Erwin van den Eshof. Vedder presented the game show Deal or No Deal in 2021 and 2022.

Since 2022, Vedder and Jamai Loman present the talent television series Holland's Got Talent. He played the role of Judas Iscariot in The Passion 2023, a Dutch Passion Play held every Maundy Thursday since 2011.

In 2024, Vedder and Jamai Loman presented the musical theatre performance television show Stars on Stage. He plays a role in the 2024 film De Legende van Familie Vos directed by Bob Wilbers. In the same year, he plays the role of Tony Manero in the Saturday Night Fever musical.

Vedder and Jamai Loman presented the second season of Stars on Stage in 2025. They also presented the television special Stars on Stage: Soldaat van Oranje in which contestants of Stars on Stage sing songs of the musical Soldaat van Oranje. He played a role in the musical Soldier of Orange in 2026.

In 2026, he became one of the presenters of the ninth season of the show Kopen Zonder Kijken after Martijn Krabbé was no longer able to present the show due to his health. Krabbé did the voice-over and the show was presented by multiple presenters. In the show, people purchase a home without having seen it first and the team of Kopen Zonder Kijken makes all relevant decisions based on budget and preferences. Since May 2026, Vedder appears as sidekick in the quiz show Eén Tegen 100 presented by Caroline Tensen. Vedder and Jamai Loman presented the 2026 game show The House of Hide and Seek, a show based on the game of hide-and-seek. He played a role in the 2026 musical Bokkenrijders.

As of September 2026, Vedder is scheduled to play a lead role in the musical Al het blauw van de hemel. He is also producer of the show.

=== Voice acting ===
Vedder provided the Dutch voice for characters in multiple films, including The Lego Batman Movie (2017), Spider-Man: Into the Spider-Verse (2018) and The Queen's Corgi (2019). He also voiced characters in the films The Boss Baby (2017), Trolls World Tour (2020) and Luca (2021).

=== Television appearances ===
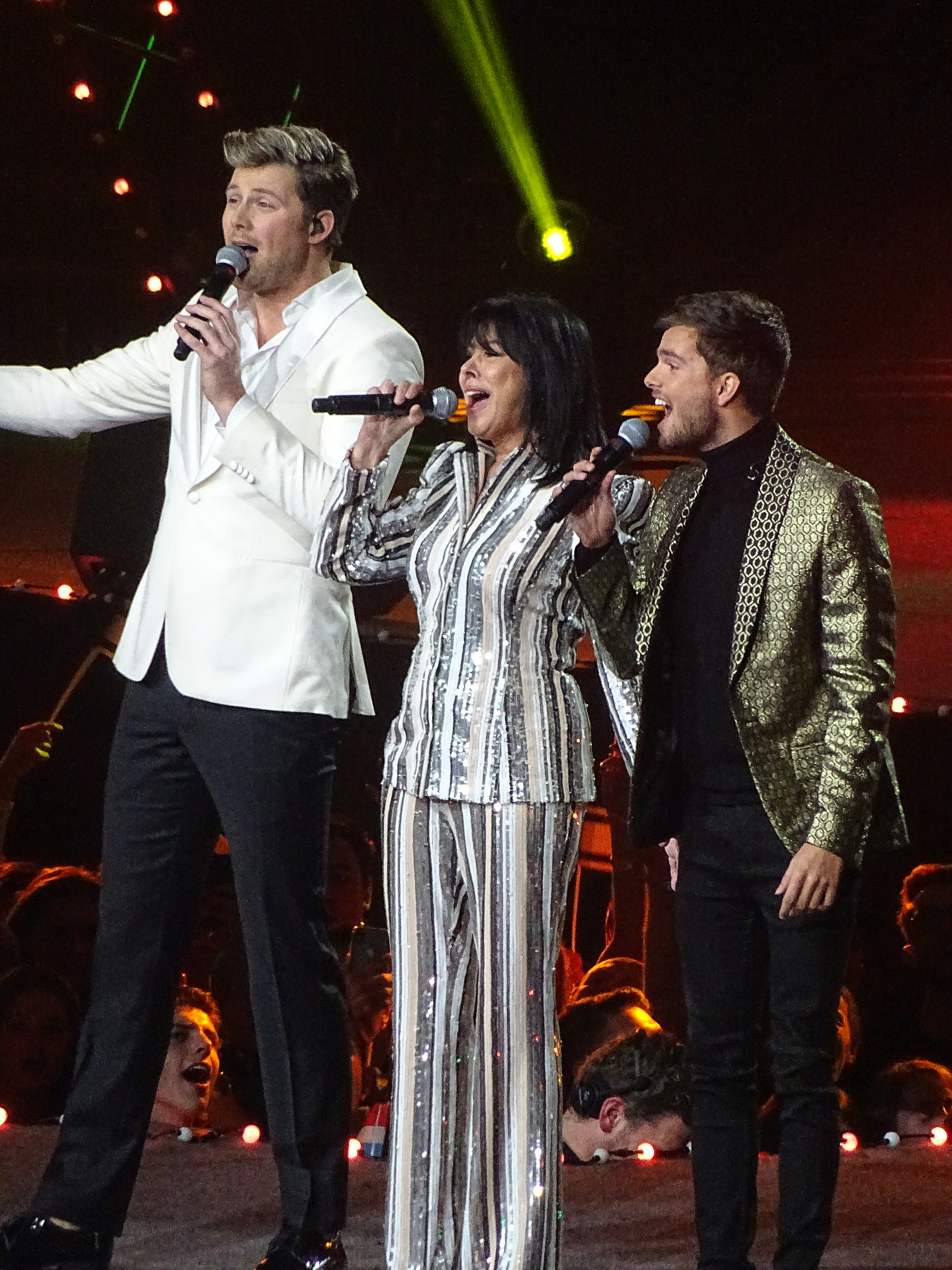
Tim Douwsma, Gali Atari and Buddy Vedder at the 2019 edition of Het Grote Songfestivalfeest.

In 2016, Vedder and Robin Martens won the dance competition television show Dance Dance Dance. After winning the show Dance Dance Dance, he performed with dancers in his own stage show titled Buddy On Tour. Vedder appeared in a 2016 episode of the game show Ik hou van Holland. He also appeared in a 2019 episode of the quiz show Britt's Beestenbende.

Vedder won the 2020 season of Wie is de Mol? by identifying Rob Dekay as the mole. He appeared in multiple episodes of the singing show Secret Duets and he also became a panel member in the show.

== Personal life ==
His sister Eva Vedder competes in WTA and ITF tennis competitions.

== Awards ==
- 2017 Zapp Awards: Beste Zapp-presentator
- 2018 Zapp Awards: Beste Jeugdpresentator
- 2019 Zapp Awards: Beste Jeugdpresentator
- 2020 Zapp Awards: Favoriete Ster Jeugdprogramma

== Selected filmography ==
=== As actor (musical) ===
- Murder Ballad (2020, 2021)
- Saturday Night Fever (2024, 2025)
- Soldier of Orange (2026)
- Bokkenrijders (2026)
- Al het blauw van de hemel (upcoming)

=== As actor (television) ===
- Goede tijden, slechte tijden (2015–2017)

=== As actor (film) ===
- De film van Dylan Haegens (2018)
- Misfit 3: De Finale (2020)
- De Legende van Familie Vos (2024)

=== As presenter ===
- Kids Top 20 (2015 – 2018)
- Te leuk om waar te zijn (2019)
- Deal or No Deal (2021–2022)
- Holland's Got Talent (2022–2025)
- Stars on Stage (2024–present)
- Stars on Stage: Soldaat van Oranje (2025)
- Kopen Zonder Kijken (2026)
- The House of Hide and Seek (2026)

=== As jury member ===
- The Masked Singer (2019 – present)

=== As contestant ===
- Dance Dance Dance (2016)
- Ik hou van Holland (2016)
- De Jongens tegen de Meisjes (2017)
- Britt's Beestenbende (2019)
- Wie is de Mol? (2020)
- Secret Duets (2023)
