= Dennis Weening =

Dutch television presenter (born 1977)

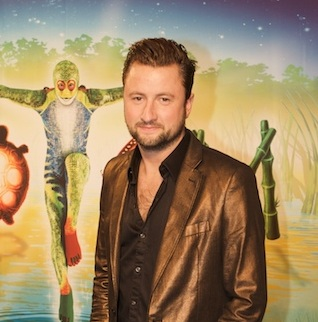
- Weening in 2010
- Born: 21 February 1977 (age 49); The Hague, Netherlands
- Occupation: Television presenter
- Known for: Expeditie Robinson; So You Think You Can Dance; Wie is de Mol?

Dennis Weening (born 21 February 1977) is a Dutch television presenter. He is known for presenting the show Expeditie Robinson. He is also known as co-presenter of So You Think You Can Dance and for appearing in the reality television series Wie is de Mol?.

== Career ==
In 2008, Weening participated in the reality television show Wie is de Mol? playing the role of the mole. He was identified by Edo Brunner and Brunner won the prize money of €20,375. Weening also briefly appeared in the 2024 season of the show and he was a contestant in the 2025 anniversary season. He was co-presenter of multiple seasons of the dance competition show So You Think You Can Dance. He was also one of the presenters of the show Wipeout in which contestants need to complete an obstacle course.

Weening presented the game show The Pain Game in 2011 in which contestants need to complete painful or unpleasant punishments to remain in the game. He renewed his contract with RTL 5 in 2012.

Weening presented Expeditie Robinson, for multiple years together with Nicolette Kluijver, between 2012 and 2018. He was also a contestant in the 2010 season of the show. Kaj Gorgels succeeded him as presenter of Expeditie Robinson. Weening and Jan Kooijman presented the show Killer Karaoke in 2013.

In 2014, he presented a Dutch version of the Irish talent show The Hit. In the same year, Weening and Johnny de Mol presented the show Project P: Stop Het Pesten about bullying at schools. He also presented the 2014 show Tourette On Tour in which he follows people with Tourette syndrome preparing for a concert.

In 2015, Weening and Lieke van Lexmond presented the show Blind naar de top in which blind people climb to the top of Mount Kilimanjaro in Tanzania. They also climb the mountain blindfolded themselves. In 2015 and 2016, he presented the show Bizarre Eters about people with bizarre eating habits. He also presented Bizarre Slapers about people with sleeping disorders or bizarre sleeping habits.

He presented the 2016 dance competition television show Battle On The Dancefloor. Weening renewed his contract with RTL 5 for two years in 2016. In 2017, he presented the first season of the dating show Adam Zkt. Eva VIPS. Weening presented the 2018 season of the television show Levenslang met dwang? in which he follows people with obsessive–compulsive disorder. He was also one of the presenters of Zon, zuipen, ziekenhuis: hier is het feestje which looks at partying young people during their holiday.

Weening's contract with RTL Nederland was not renewed in 2018. After leaving RTL, he presented the 2019 television show Ink Master: Meesters van de Lage Landen - Shop Wars, a Dutch/Belgian edition of the American reality series Ink Master, for the channel Spike. He also presented the show Dennis maakt kennis for the channel FOX Sports in which he meets with footballers of association football club ADO Den Haag. In the same year, Weening was a contestant in the show The Big Escape in which contestants need to escape from an escape room.

In 2020, Weening and Bella Hay presented Eerste Hulp bij Tattoo Disasters in which people have their tattoo improved. He presented the 2020 television show ADHDennis in which he looks at attention deficit hyperactivity disorder (ADHD). In the show, he is also diagnosed with ADHD. He was also backstage presenter in season one of the singing talent television show We Want More. In 2021, Weening and Leo Alkemade were among the duos to present De Dansmarathon, a show in which contestants need to dance for fifty hours to win 100,000 euros.

He played the role of Judas Iscariot in The Passion 2022, a Dutch Passion Play held every Maundy Thursday since 2011. Weening and Leo Alkemade were contestants in a 2023 episode of the game show The Big Bang. Weening and his brother appeared in a 2024 episode of the singing television show DNA Singers, a show in which a relative of a Dutch singer sings a song and two teams have to guess who the person is related to. He was also a contestant in a 2024 episode of the quiz show Waku Waku.

In 2025, he stayed in a prison for the television show Hel of hotel. Weening performed as drag queen Dolores Flores in the 2025 season of the drag queen show Make Up Your Mind. He also appeared in a 2025 episode of the game show Let's play ball presented by Jan Versteegh in which contestants have to roll a large ball from one location to another. He was a contestant in the 2025 anniversary season of the television show Wie is de Mol?. Weening was a contestant in the 2026 television show Roadtrippers VIPS. He took part in a team with Tess Milne and Thomas van der Vlugt.

=== Voice acting ===
Weening provided the Dutch voice for the Joker in the 2017 film The Lego Batman Movie. It was his debut as voice actor. He also voiced a character in the 2017 film Bigfoot Junior and in the 2020 film Bigfoot Family.

== Personal life ==
Weening was a Jehovah's Witness until age 23.

Weening and Stella Maassen married in 2007. They separated in 2025. They have two daughters and Weening also has one daughter from a previous marriage.

Weening has attention deficit hyperactivity disorder (ADHD).

== Selected filmography ==
=== As presenter ===
- Wipeout
- So You Think You Can Dance
- The Pain Game (2011)
- Expeditie Robinson (2012 – 2018)
- Killer Karaoke (2013)
- The Hit (2014)
- Project P: Stop Het Pesten (2014)
- Tourette On Tour (2014)
- Blind naar de top (2015)
- Bizarre Eters (2015 – 2016)
- Bizarre Slapers (2016)
- Battle On The Dancefloor (2016)
- Adam Zkt. Eva VIPS (2017)
- Zon, zuipen, ziekenhuis: hier is het feestje (2018)
- Levenslang met dwang? (2018)
- Ink Master: Meesters van de Lage Landen - Shop Wars (2019)
- Dennis maakt kennis (2019)
- Eerste Hulp bij Tattoo Disasters (2020)
- ADHDennis (2020)
- We Want More (2020, backstage presenter)
- De Dansmarathon (2021)

=== As contestant ===
- Wie is de Mol? (2008)
- Expeditie Robinson (2010)
- De Jongens tegen de Meisjes (2011, 2015)
- Een goed stel hersens (2017)
- De Gevaarlijkste Wegen van de Wereld (2018)
- The Big Escape (2019)
- Britt's Beestenbende (2019)
- Code van Coppens: De wraak van de Belgen (2021, 2024)
- Game of Talents (2021)
- De Verraders (2022, Halloween edition)
- The Big Bang (2023)
- DNA Singers (2024)
- Waku Waku (2024)
- No Way Back VIPS (2025)
- Make Up Your Mind (2025)
- Let's play ball (2025)
- Wie is de Mol? (2025, anniversary season)
- Roadtrippers VIPS (2026)

=== As himself ===
- Hel of hotel (2025)
