= The Passion (Netherlands) =

Dutch passion play

- Logo since 2023
- Genre: Music
- Created by: Andy King-Dabbs and Jacco Doornbos
- Showrunner: The Passion: Hemelvaart
- Directed by: David Grifhorst
- Composers: Cor Bakker (2011–2012); Eric van Tijn (2013–present)
- Country of origin: Netherlands
- No. of seasons: 14
- No. of episodes: 17

Production
- Producer: Cynthia van Ingen
- Running time: 90 minutes

Original release
- Network: RKK (2011–2015); EO (2011–2020); KRO-NCRV (2016–present)
- Release: 21 April 2011

The Passion is a Dutch passion play, held every Maundy Thursday since 2011 in a different city each year. The event is broadcast live on Dutch television. In 2015 and 2018, it was broadcast on radio as well.

The event began as a collaboration between the broadcasters EO and RKK. At present, it is mainly a joint effort between the broadcasters EO and KRO-NCRV.

The participating organizations consider The Passion missionary work and they see it as a chance to promote Easter and Christianity in general.

== Creation ==
The Dutch event and television program is partly inspired by the English local play Manchester Passion, held on Good Friday and broadcast by the BBC Three. The production company Eye2Eye Media brought the event to the Netherlands. The first Dutch version was held at the market square in Gouda, with a live broadcast on national television on Maundy Thursday 2011. It proved successful and new editions followed thereafter.

Currently, The Passion is a project between the broadcasters EO and KRO-NCRV, the Protestant and Roman Catholic churches in the Netherlands, and the Netherlands Bible Society.

== Feature ==
=== Structure ===
On Maundy Thursday, three days prior to Easter, the event takes place on a main square in a Dutch city. On this square, Dutch celebrities paraphrase selected Bible passages to tell the story of Easter and Jesus, with live performances of relevant Dutch pop songs in between. Throughout the years, songs from Dutch musicians such as Marco Borsato, BLØF, Guus Meeuwis and Nick & Simon have been used. Meanwhile, a group of 40 people bare a huge white cross towards the main podium in the center square. The cross has a weight of almost 900 pounds and it is nearly 20 feet tall. It is possible to follow this event online; with a second screen, people can join the procession virtually on The Passion website.

=== Location ===
The geographical spread of all Dutch editions throughout the country

The host city is selected annually on the basis of various factors:

- The recognition amongst the Dutch population. A local theme that ties in with the story of suffering and resurrection is helpful. For example, the 2015 edition, staged in Enschede, referred to a fireworks disaster and the subsequent rebuilding of a new urban district called Roombeek.
- The presence of a large space that can carry up to 20,000–25,000 people. The performance stage is built in this area. Additionally, an overflow zone is required to safely disperse excess visitors, if need be.
- The possibility to adequately record the different scenes.
- The willingness of the city to provide both financial and practical contributions.

The first three editions were all held in the province of South Holland. The fourth edition, held in Groningen, was the first outside of the Randstad. Since that year, the locations are geographically spread throughout the country. The 2016 edition was staged in Amersfoort; the 2017 edition in Leeuwarden and the 2018 edition in Amsterdam Zuidoost. The 2019 edition was staged in Dordrecht. In 2020, due to the coronavirus pandemic the event was cancelled. Instead, an alternative program was broadcast from Hilversum including fragments from previous editions. In 2021 the event was held in Roermond, the city that would originally host the 2020 edition. The 2022 edition was held in Doetinchem, the 2023 edition was held in Harlingen, and the 2024 edition was held in Zeist. The 2025 edition was held in Terneuzen and in 2026, The Passion will be held in Dwingeloo.

== Editions ==
=== 2011, Gouda ===
The event was staged on 21 April in the old city center of Gouda. The event attracted about 20,000 visitors and it was followed by around one million viewers on television. In June 2012, the Gouda edition of The Passion won an award for best city marketing event.

=== 2012, Rotterdam ===
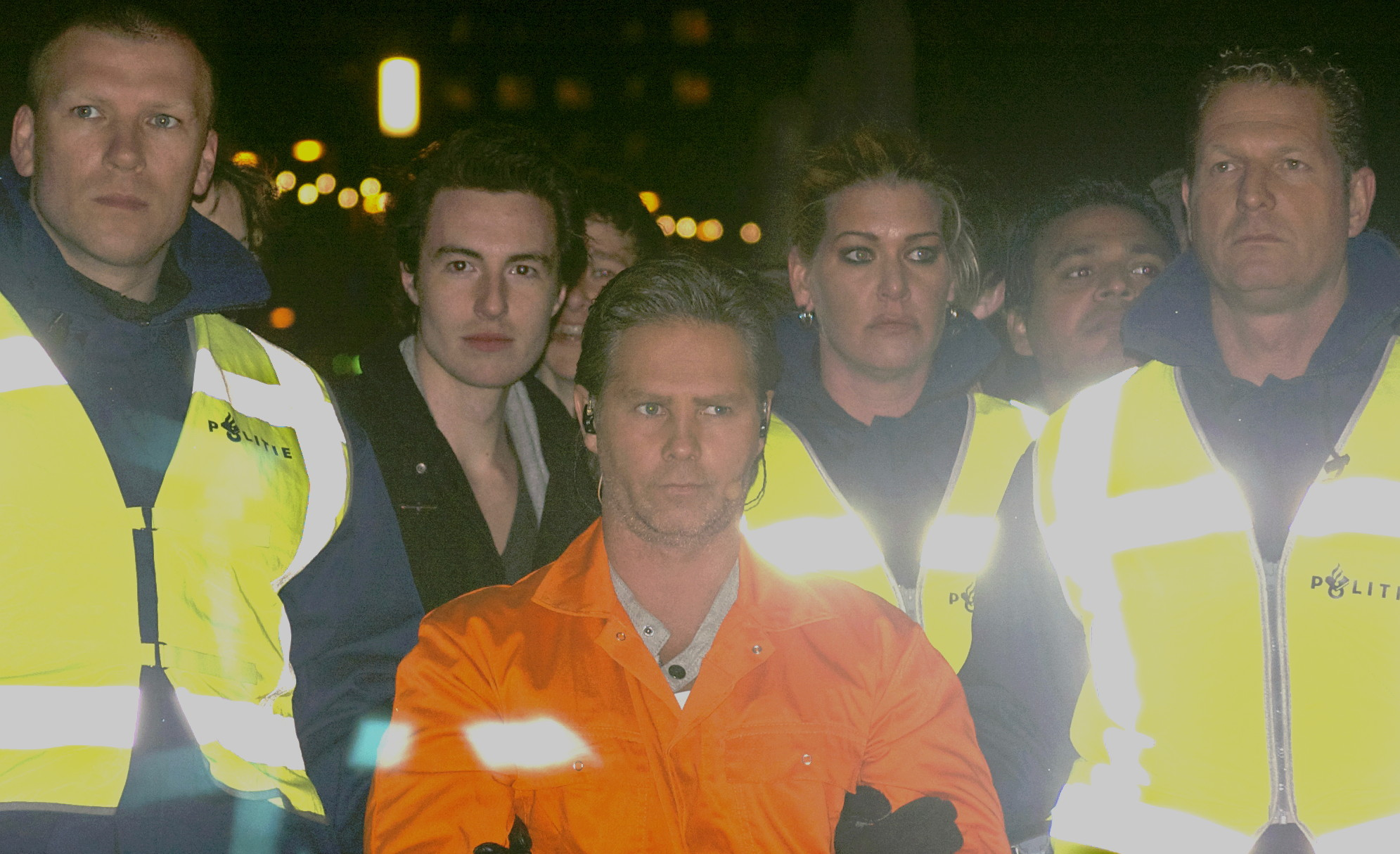
Dutch singer Danny de Munk played Jesus in 2012

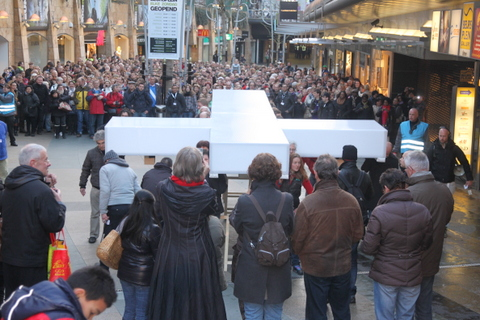
Cross bearers en route — The Passion 2012

The Rotterdam event was staged on 5 April on the Willemsplein. It was broadcast on national television and seen by 1.7 million viewers and nearly 20,000 visitors attended the event.

=== 2013, The Hague ===
The event was staged on 28 March in the city center of The Hague. The procession departed from the graveyard Sint Petrusbanden. The main stage of this edition was formed by the Hofvijver. Around 2.3 million viewers saw The Passion live on television.

=== 2014, Groningen ===
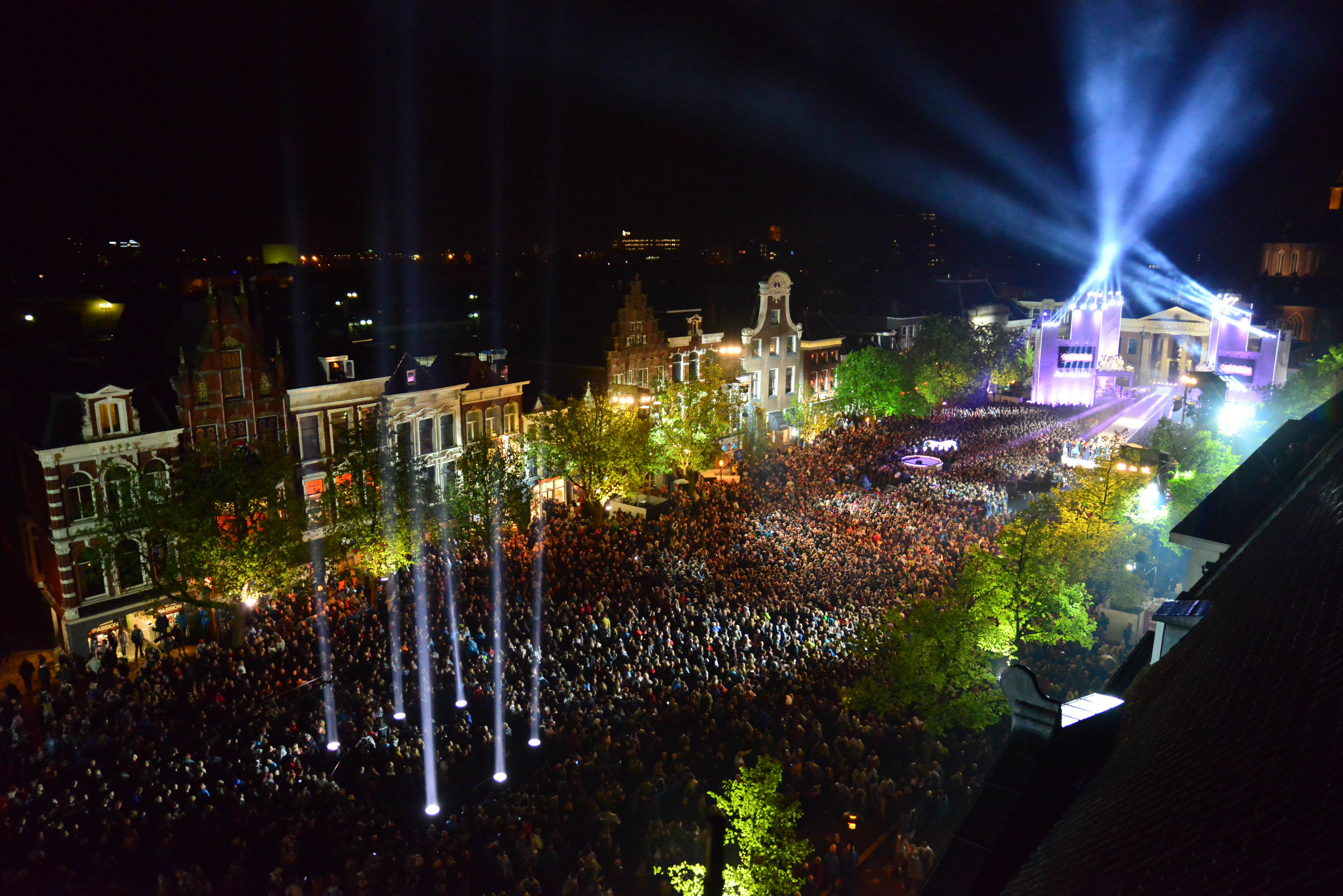
The Passion in the Dutch City of Groningen, 2014

On 17 April, The Passion was staged on the Vismarkt in Groningen. Roughly 20,000 visitors came to see the play and it had around 3.2 million television viewers.

=== 2015, Enschede ===
The Passion was held on 2 April on the Hendrik Jan van Heekplein in Enschede. This year, the event was broadcast on radio as well. A total of 3,574,000 viewers watched live television broadcasting.

=== 2016, Amersfoort ===
On 24 March 2016, The Passion was held on the Eemplein in Amersfoort. 20,000 people attended the event and more than 3 million people watched the event live on their televisions.

=== 2017, Leeuwarden ===
The seventh edition was held on 13 April 2017 at the Wilhelminaplein in Leeuwarden. About 16,000 people were present and more than 3 million people watched the live broadcast.

=== 2018, Amsterdam ===
This version was held on 31 March 2018 in De Bijlmer. 3,1 million people watched the event live on their televisions and another 15,000 to 20,000 people attended it.

=== 2019, Dordrecht ===
The ninth edition of The Passion was held on April 18 of 2019 in Dordrecht. More than 20.000 spectators were there to see Edwin Jonkers, Edsilia Rombley and many more act and sing.

=== 2020, Hilversum (Cancelled) ===
Due to the coronavirus pandemic, The Passion of 2020 was cancelled. It was supposed to be held in Roermond. The organization looked for an alternative in mid-March, such as a performance without an audience. A television broadcast was chosen that mainly looked back on previous editions. Presenter Johnny de Mol told the Easter story live from the Media Park in Hilversum, including fragments of performances from previous years. Anne-Mar Zwart presented the "procession" next to a stationary cross. Viewers could digitally "follow" and send messages and videos. The program was entitled 10 years of The Passion: 'Now give me your fear'.

=== 2021, Roermond ===
The eleventh edition of The Passion was held on a stage at Munsterplein on 1 April 2021 in Roermond. Because of the ongoing coronavirus pandemic, this edition was held without an audience. More than 2.5 million people watched the live broadcast on Thursday evening. 334 thousand people watched the broadcast in the following week.

=== 2022, Doetinchem ===
The twelfth edition of The Passion was held in Doetinchem on 14 April 2022. Once more, this edition was held without an audience. This edition introduced the role of Mary Magdalene.

=== 2023, Harlingen ===
The thirteenth edition of The Passion was held in Harlingen on 6 April 2023. Thousands of spectators attended in person, and nearly 2.5 million viewers watched the broadcast on television. An additional 45,000 people watched the broadcast online.

=== 2024, Zeist ===
The fourteenth edition of The Passion was held in Zeist on 28 March 2024. Almost 2.5 million viewers watched this version of The Passion.

=== 2025, Terneuzen ===
The fifteenth edition of The Passion was held in Terneuzen on 17 April 2025. About 5,000 people attended the event and more than 2 million watched the broadcast online.

=== 2026, Dwingeloo ===
On 2 April 2026 The Passion was held in Dwingeloo.

== Cast ==
=== 2010s ===
Role	2011	2012	2013	2014	2015	2016	2017	2018	2019
Jesus	Syb van der Ploeg	Danny de Munk	René van Kooten	Jan Dulles	Jim de Groot	Martijn Fischer	Dwight Dissels	Tommie Christiaan	Edwin Jonker
Mary	Do	Berget Lewis	Anita Meyer	Simone Kleinsma	Shirma Rouse	Ellen ten Damme	Elske DeWall	Glennis Grace	Edsilia Rombley
Peter	Thomas Berge	Frans Bauer	Jim Bakkum	Stanley Burleson	Jeroen van der Boom	Mark van Eeuwen	Omri Tindal	Brainpower	Paul Sinha
Judas Iscariot	Frank Lammers	Charly Luske	Daniël Boissevain	Jamai Loman	Jeroen van Koningsbrugge	Xander de Buisonjé	Roel van Velzen	Jeangu Macrooy	Lucas Hamming
Pontius Pilate	Wilbert Gieske	Henk Poort	Tom Jansen	Jack van Gelder	Jon van Eerd	Howard Komproe	Johnny Kraaijkamp jr.	Arjan Ederveen	Porgy Franssen
Narrator	Erik Dijkstra	Philip Freriks	Jörgen Raymann	Beau van Erven Dorens	Robert ten Brink	Lenette van Dongen	Remco Veldhuis	Noraly Beyer	Martijn Krabbé
Procession Reporter	Hanna Verboom	Antoinette Hertsenberg	Renate Verbaan	Lieke van Lexmond	Bridget Maasland	Sofie van den Enk	Kefah Allush	Bert van Leeuwen	Klaas van Kruistum

=== 2020s ===
Role	2020	2021	2022	2023	2024	2025	2026
Jesus	—N/a	Freek Bartels	Soy Kroon	Sinan Eroglu	William Spaaij	Dorian Bindels	Milan van Waardenburg
Mary	—N/a	Trijntje Oosterhuis	Noortje Herlaar	Marlijn Weerdenburg	Angela Schijf	Eva Simons	Roxeanne Hazes
Peter	—N/a	Leo Alkemade	Thomas Cammaert	Ferdi Stofmeel	Matteo van der Grijn	Défano Holwijn	Bastiaan Ragas
Judas Iscariot	—N/a	Rob Dekay	Dennis Weening	Buddy Vedder	Keizer	Eddy Zoëy	Boaz Kok
Pontius Pilate	—N/a	Tygo Gernandt	Sabri Saad El Hamus	Dragan Bakema	Victor Löw	Richard Groenendijk	Mike Libanon
Mary Magdalene	—N/a	—N/a	Kim-Lian van der Meij	Bertrie Wierenga	Gaia Aikman	Vajèn van den Bosch	Anouk Maas
Thomas	—N/a	—N/a	Juneoer Mers	—N/a	Robbert Rodenburg	Guido Spek	Thomas van der Vlugt
Narrator	Johnny de Mol	Humberto Tan	Ruud de Wild	Thomas van Luyn	Kluun	Wendy van Dijk	Astrid Kersseboom
Procession Reporter	Anne-Mar Zwart	Anita Witzier	Sosha Duysker	Anita Witzier	Anita Witzier	Anita Witzier	Anita Witzier
