= Misfit 2 =

2019 Dutch film

- Theatrical release poster
- Directed by: Erwin van den Eshof
- Written by: Ernst Gonlag; Michel Bonset; Karen van den Ende; Erwin van den Eshof
- Produced by: Jeroen Koopman; Lisa May Visser
- Starring: Djamilla; Bente Fokkens
- Cinematography: Jorrit Garretsen
- Distributed by: Splendid Film
- Release date: 25 September 2019
- Running time: 81 minutes
- Country: Netherlands
- Language: Dutch
- Box office: $1.5 million

Misfit 2 is a 2019 Dutch family film and is a sequel to the 2017 film Misfit. The film earned $1.5 million upon its initial release, making it the seventh most visited Dutch film of 2017. It won a Golden Film. The sequel Misfit 3: De Finale was released in 2020.
