= Britt Dekker =

Dutch actress and television presenter

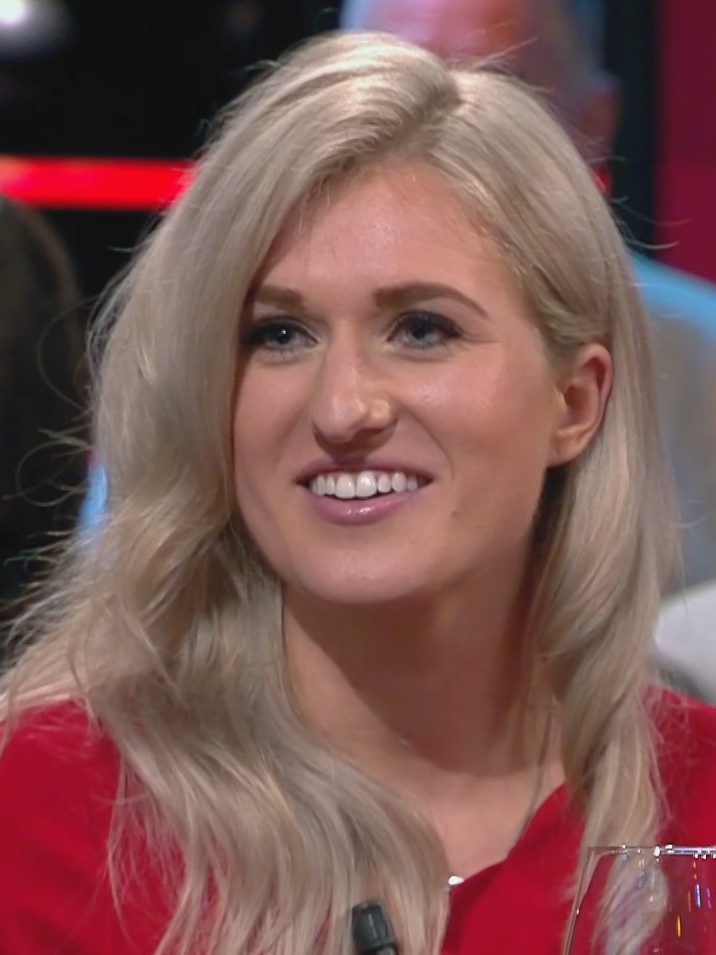
- Dekker in 2018
- Born: 24 February 1992 (age 34); Purmerend, Netherlands
- Occupations: Actress; Television presenter

Britt Dekker (born 24 February 1992) is a Dutch equestrian, actress and television presenter. She has presented several television shows, including Britt's Beestenbende, We Want More and First & Last. Dekker is also known for her role as Megan in the films Whitestar (2019) and Silverstar (2022).

== Career ==
=== Television ===
Dekker appeared in 65 episodes of the dating show Take Me Out, the Dutch version of the Australian show Taken Out, presented by Eddy Zoëy. In 2011, she won the television show Echte meisjes in de jungle, the first season of the Echte meisjes ... television series. In the show, female contestants from several reality television shows went to Suriname to compete in various challenges.

Dekker and Ymke Wieringa both appeared in Take Me Out and Echte meisjes in de jungle and they went on to create several shows together, including De zomer van Britt & Ymke (2011) and Britt en Ymke en het mysterie van... (2012).

In 2012, Dekker appeared in Echte meisjes op zoek naar zichzelf, the second season of the Echte meisjes ... television series. This season took place in Nepal. She appeared in an episode of the television game show De Jongens tegen de Meisjes. Dekker and Wieringa also hosted their own talk show Britt en Ymke stellen vragen in 2012.

Dekker and Wieringa presented the 2013 show Waar rook is... zijn Britt & Ymke in which they fact-check celebrity gossip. They also presented the 2014 television show Britt en Ymke aan de bak in Blanes in which they went to Blanes, Spain. In the same year, Dekker and Jochem van Gelder presented the television show Het Beste Idee van Nederland in which contestants present their inventions to a jury.

Dekker presented the quiz show Britt's Beestenbende, with questions about animals, in 2019 and 2020. In the show, two teams compete against each other and the team captains were Tim Douwsma and Défano Holwijn. The show was nominated for a 2020 Zapp Award in the category Favoriete Jeugdprogramma. It was her debut presenting a television studio show. In 2019, Dekker was one of the team captains in the show Te leuk om waar te zijn presented by Buddy Vedder. In the show, two teams need to decide which short videos are real and which are fake. Wilfred Genee and Britt Dekker were guests in an episode of the 2020 television show Het hek van de dam, a show about shepherding and conversations between the guests.

In 2021, she was one of the team captains in the quiz show Iedereen is van de wereld presented by Jan Versteegh. In the quiz, each team has to answer questions which are based on interviews that were conducted with people around the world. Wendy van Dijk and Britt Dekker presented the second season of the singing talent television show We Want More in 2021. Since 2022, she presents the television show CupCakeCup, a show in which contestants create cupcakes.

In 2023, Dekker appeared in an episode of The Masked Singer. Since 2024, she presents the television show Lachen om Home Video's, the Dutch version of the show America's Funniest Home Videos. Dekker was also a co-host in the television show Ja of Nee? presented by Kalvijn. She was one of the presenters of the 2024 show De Beste Wensen in which the presenters make dreams come true.

Dekker and Ron Boszhard won the Favoriete Zapp duo award at the 2025 Zapp Awards. She was one of the team captains in the 2025 quiz show Hart tegen Hart presented by Harm Edens. Dekker and Klaas van Kruistum presented the 2026 Zapp Awards.

As of September 2026, she is scheduled to appear as guest in the show Vier Linkerhanden, a show presented by Wilfred Genee about conversations with guests while working on a do it yourself project.

=== Film ===
In 2019, Dekker played the role of Megan in the adventure film Whitestar. It was her film debut. She also played Megan in the 2022 adventure film Silverstar. The film won the Golden Film award after having sold 100,000 tickets. In that same year, she also played a role in the film De Club van Sinterklaas en de Race Tegen de Klok. This film also won the Golden Film award.

As of March 2026, she is scheduled to play a lead role in the 2026 film Racing Johnny.

=== Writing ===
In 2023, Dekker published the children's book Een veulen op de manege. Her second book Winteravontuur te paard was published in January 2024. Her third book Veulen vermist! was published in September 2024. Her fourth book Paard op hol! was published in 2025.

=== Equestrianism ===
She finished in 13th place at the 2018 Dutch Dressage Championships held in Ermelo, Netherlands and she finished in 11th place in the competition in 2021. In 2023, Dekker won the gold medal in her event at the Iberian Masters event held in Paris, France. Dekker is also an ambassador for the Koninklijke Nederlandse Hippische Sportfederatie (KNHS), the national organisation for equestrianism.

=== YouTube ===
Dekker is one of the creators of the YouTube channel PaardenpraatTV, a channel about horses. The channel won the Televizier-Ring Jeugd 2026 award in October 2026.

== Personal life ==
Dekker and director Max Apotowski married in September 2024. They met each other during the 2013 television show Waar rook is... zijn Britt & Ymke. Her wedding dress was designed by Lebanese fashion designer Zuhair Murad. Television presenter Jochem van Gelder led the wedding ceremony.

== Selected filmography ==
=== Film ===
- Whitestar (2019)
- Silverstar (2022)
- De Club van Sinterklaas en de Race Tegen de Klok (2022)
- Racing Johnny (2026, upcoming)

=== As presenter ===
- Het Beste Idee van Nederland (2014)
- Britt's Beestenbende (2019 – 2020)
- Voor het blok (2020 – present)
- We Want More (2021)
- First & Last (2021)
- CupCakeCup (2022 – present)
- Lachen om Home Video's (2024 – present)
- Ja of Nee? (2024, co-host)
- De Beste Wensen (2024)

=== As team captain ===
- Iedereen is van de wereld (2021)
- Hart tegen Hart (2025)

=== As contestant ===
- Take Me Out (2009)
- Echte meisjes in de jungle (2011)
- Echte meisjes op zoek naar zichzelf (2012)
- De Jongens tegen de Meisjes (2012)
- Sterren Springen Op Zaterdag (2014)
- Het Jachtseizoen (2021)
- Think Inside the Box (2022)
- Dit was het nieuws (2022)
- The Masked Singer (2023)

=== As herself ===
- Het hek van de dam (2020)
- Vier Linkerhanden (2026, upcoming)

== Discography ==
- F*cking Vet!!! (2011)
- De wereld rond (2012, with Ymke Wieringa)

== Bibliography ==
- Een veulen op de manege (2023, Kosmos Uitgevers)
- Winteravontuur te paard (2024, Kosmos Uitgevers)
- Veulen vermist! (2024, Kosmos Uitgevers)
- Paard op hol! (2025, Kosmos Uitgevers)
