= Renate Verbaan =

Dutch television presenter (born 1979)

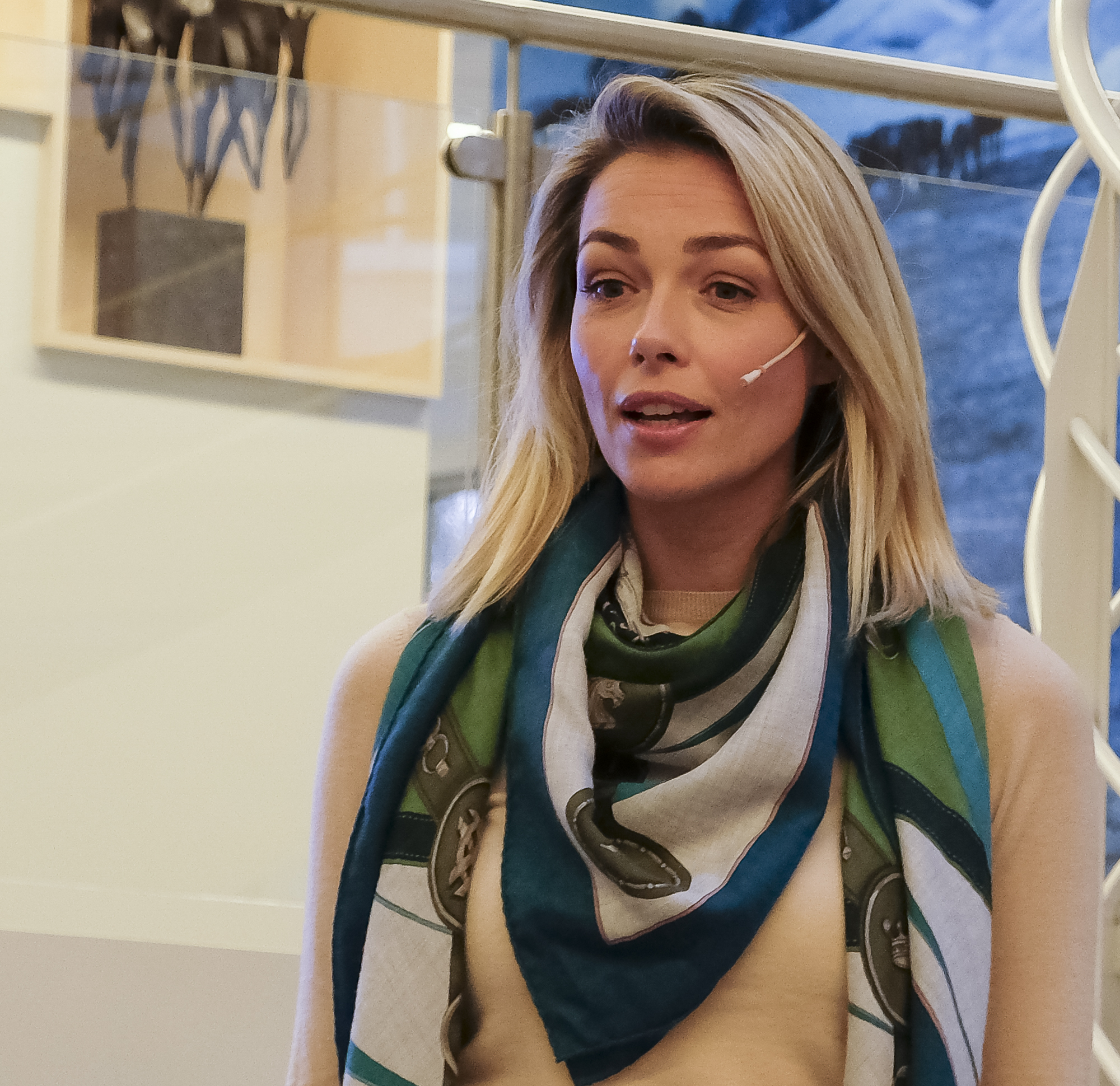
- Born: 27 October 1979 (age 46); Rotterdam, Netherlands

Renate Verbaan (born 27 October 1979) is a Dutch actress and television presenter.

== Career ==
Verbaan was a model before auditioning to be a video jockey for TMF Nederland. As part of a contest she was voted by the audience to be a new host, which she remained from 2004 to 2006. From 2006 until 2009 she presented RTL Travel's Hotlist.

In 2007, she participated in the television show Wie is de Mol?, where she reached the final. She also became ambassador for Feyenoord, the main football club of her hometown Rotterdam. As of 2010 she is also a UNICEF Goodwill Ambassador.

In 2011, she presented Secret Story, the Dutch adaptation of the French reality show with the same name. In that same year, she also participated in an episode of the game show De Jongens tegen de Meisjes.

She was the procession reporter in the 2013 edition of The Passion.

From 2013 till 2019 she presented Shownieuws.

In 2022, Verbaan and Winston Gerschtanowitz appeared as two robots in an episode of The Masked Singer.

== Personal life ==
She married Winston Gerschtanowitz in 2011. They have two sons born in 2008 and 2010.

== Filmography ==
=== Television ===
- TMF Nederlands (2004-2006)
- RTL Travel's Hotlist (2006-2009)
- De TV-Kantine (2010)
- Secret Story (2011)
- Gooische Vrouwen (2011)

=== Film ===
- Boys & Girls (2000)
