= Misfit 3: De Finale =

2020 Dutch film

- Directed by: Erwin van den Eshof
- Written by: Brian De Vore; Karen van den Ende; Erwin van den Eshof
- Produced by: Erik Engelen; Andreas Klein; Thomas Wolff; Lisa May Visser
- Starring: Djamilla; Bente Fokkens
- Cinematography: Jorrit Garretsen
- Edited by: Jeffrey De Vore
- Distributed by: Splendid Film; Netflix
- Release date: December 16, 2020
- Running time: 82 minutes
- Country: Netherlands
- Language: Dutch

Misfit 3: De Finale is a 2020 Dutch family film and is a sequel to the 2017 film Misfit and the 2019 film Misfit 2. Unlike the previous installments, it skipped cinemas and was directly distributed on Netflix.

== Reception ==
Het Parool gave the film a low review and said it was as cliché-riddled as its predecessors. However, Netflix also announced that the movie would get a spin-off television series.
