= Checkpoint (TV program) =

- Genre: Entertainment
- Directed by: Jan Pool
- Presented by: Klaas van Kruistum
- Country of origin: Netherlands
- Original language: Dutch
- No. of series: 22
- No. of episodes: 330 (+14 specials)

Production
- Running time: 25 minutes

Original release
- Network: Zapp (EO)
- Release: 14 March 2009 – 25 December 2021

Checkpoint is a Dutch children's television show broadcast by the Evangelische Omroep on Zapp from 2009 to 2021. It can be described as a jumble between Brainiac, Jackass and Fear Factor for youth. The show is presented by Klaas van Kruistum.

In this show tests are carried out which can be sent in by the viewers. However, most tests are not based upon scientific methods. It is rather a show in which stunts are performed.

The ninth season of Checkpoint aired in September 2014.

== Structure and development ==
Since 2009, when the show aired for the first time, its structure has chanced a couple of times.

During the first two seasons of Checkpoint, every episode consisted of three tests. The second one always was Boys vs Girls. In these tests the differences between boys and girls are scrutinized and it focussed on whether men or women are better in performing a certain task or function. The other two tests changed every episode and these focused on products being pinpointed.

Since the third season, which was broadcast in Spring 2010, the structure changed, the number of items went up from three to about four. Also: recurring items were introduced, of which one featured a contest. Apart from the contest now being moved to the closing credits and just a couple of exceptions this structure has still been maintained.

== Recurring items ==
=== Boys vs girls ===
This section is featured since the start of the show and nearly every episode contains a new edition. In these tests the differences between boys and girls are scrutinized and it focussed on whether men or women are better in performing a certain task or function. In the season finales a compilation of these tests is shown, which also features the final rankings of the past season (since season 3).

=== Other recurring items ===
In season 3 more recurring items are introduced. An overview:

- 1 Minuutje (1 Minute). Tasks which can/cannot be done within one minute.
- De Achtbaan (The Roller Coaster). Tasks which can/cannot be done during a roller coaster ride.
- De Auto Van Je Vader (The Car Of Your Father). What can be done with a car standing still.
- Cartoon Check. Which events from cartoons can/cannot occur in real life.
- Feestdagen (Holidays). Tips to raise the celebrations.
- Film Check (Movie Check). Which events from movies can/cannot occur in real life.
- Gevaar In Huis (Danger At Home). Dangers in and around home are scrutinized.
- De Glijbaan (The Slide). Tasks which can/cannot be done while going off a water slide.
- Handleidingen (Instruction Manuals). Instruction manuals from devices are scrutinized.
- High Speed Camera. Simple things displayed in slow-motion.
- Jong vs Oud (Young vs Old). Tasks which can be done better by either young or old people.
- Kat vs. Hond (Cat vs. Dog). Tasks which can be done better by either cats of dogs.
- De Klapper Van De Week (The Banger Of The Week). A search for the loudest bangs (explosions and stuff).
- De Kracht Van Veel (Strength In Numbers). What can be done when many of a little are merged to a big one.
- Net als in de film (Just Like In The Movies). Shows how different stunts and other events in movies are performed.
- Nederland vs ... (Netherlands vs ...) Traditional tasks performed by youth from a certain country compared to youth from the Netherlands.
- Onbreekbaar? (Unbreakable?) Certain objects classified as unbreakable are tested.
- Ondersteboven (Upside Down). Tasks which can/cannot be done while hanging upside down.
- De Oven (The Oven). Objects placed into an oven to see what happens.
- Poep en Plas (Poo and Pee). Uses for feces.
- Psychotest. Psychological tests.
- Recycle. Reuse of certain objects.
- Schimmelgevaar (Dangers Of Mold). Food placed into a container to test the shelf life.
- Spreekwoorden (Proverbs). Certain proverbs and sayings are tested if they are still correct these days.
- Top Secret. Tests which are ill-suited for parents.
- Vuurwerk (Fireworks). Dangers of firework are shown.
- De Windtunnel (The Wind Tunnel). Tasks which can/cannot be done in strong winds.

==== Recurring items a season ====
| Rubriek | 3 | 4 | 5 | 6 | 7 | 8 |
|---|---|---|---|---|---|---|
| 1 Minuutje | x | x | | | | |
| De Achtbaan | | x | | | | |
| De Auto Van Je Vader | | | | | | x |
| Cartoon Check | | | | | | x |
| Feestdagen | | | x | | | |
| Gevaar in Huis | | | x | | | |
| De Glijbaan | | | x | x | | |
| Handleidingen | | | | | x | x |
| High Speed Camera | | | | | x | |
| Jong vs. Oud | | | | x | | |
| Kat vs. Hond | | x | | | | |
| De Klapper Van De Week | | | | | x | x |
| De Kracht Van Veel | | | | | x | x |
| Net als in de film | | x | x | x | | x |
| Nederland vs ... | | | | | x | |
| Onbreekbaar? | x | | | | | |
| Ondersteboven | x | | | | | |
| De Oven | x | | | | | |
| Poep en Plas | | | | | x | |
| Psychotest | x | x | x | | | |
| Recycle | | | | x | | |
| Schimmelgevaar | | | x | x | | |
| Spreekwoorden | | | | x | | |
| Top Secret | | x | | | | |
| Vuurwerk | | | x | x | | |
| De Windtunnel | x | | | | | |

== Success ==
Checkpoint is very popular and in the period the show runs, the ratings from the broadcastings raised to high values. It became one of the flagship shows of Zapp and also belongs to the best viewed shows on Nederland 3 on Saturday. Checkpoint even got his own events, like the vader/zoon-dag (father/son day), which are successful as well and heavily visited.

The show was also awarded several awards. In 2011 Checkpoint won the Cinekid Kinderkast Publieksprijs (Cinekid Kinderkastaudience award) in the category non-fiction. The next year it was nominated for the prestigious Prix Jeunesse international and eventually archived the Children's Jury Award. The same year they got a nomination for the Gouden Stuiver (Golden Nickle), which was however eventually won by Het Klokhuis. Just a week later they revenged by winning the Cinekid Kinderkast Publieksprijs for the second successive year. In 2013 they were once again nominated for the Gouden Stuiver, but Het Sinterklaasjournaal was the final winner this time. In 2014 Checkpoint won the TV-BEELDEN award for best children's show.

| Year | Award | Status |
|---|---|---|
| 2011 | Cinekid Kinderkast Non-fiction | Won |
| 2012 | Prix Jeunesse International | Won |
| 2012 | Gouden Stuiver | Nominated |
| 2012 | Cinekid Kinderkast Non-fictie | Won |
| 2013 | Gouden Stuiver | Nominated |
| 2014 | The TV-BEELDEN, best children's show. | Won |

== Spin-off ==
Early July 2014 the show gets a spin-off, called Checkpoint top 5. In this show the five best testing moments from a particular theme are shown. Examples are: the five best car crashes, the five dirtiest moments and the five best explosions.
