= Britt's Beestenbende =

Dutch television quiz show

- Presented by: Britt Dekker
- Starring: Tim Douwsma; Défano Holwijn
- Country of origin: Netherlands
- Original language: Dutch
- No. of seasons: 2
- No. of episodes: 20

Original release
- Network: AVROTROS; NPO Zapp (NPO 3)
- Release: 2019 – 2020

Britt's Beestenbende is a Dutch television quiz show with questions about animals presented by Britt Dekker in 2019 and 2020. In the show, two teams compete against each other and the team captains were Tim Douwsma and Défano Holwijn.

The show was nominated for a 2020 Zapp Award in the category Favoriete Jeugdprogramma. It was Dekker's debut presenting a television studio show.

== Seasons ==
=== Season 1 (2019) ===
The first season consisted of ten episodes.

Episode	Date	Team	
Episode	Date	Défano Holwijn	Tim Douwsma
1	31 August 2019	Tess Milne	Mattie Valk
2	7 September 2019	Stijn Fransen	Ryanne van Dorst
3	14 September 2019	Keizer	Teske de Schepper
4	21 September 2019	Frank Dane	Sterre van Woudenberg
5	28 September 2019	Dee van der Zeeuw	Buddy Vedder
6	5 October 2019	Dennis Weening	Rachel Rosier
7	12 October 2019	Barry Paf	Klaas van der Eerden
8	19 October 2019	Tommie Christiaan	Stephanie van Eer
9	26 October 2019	Marije Zuurveld	Patrick Martens
10	2 November 2019	Kees Tol	Pip Pellens

=== Season 2 (2020) ===
The second season consisted of ten episodes.

Episode	Date	Team	
Episode	Date	Défano Holwijn	Tim Douwsma
1	11 January 2020	Fajah Lourens	Rutger Vink
2	18 January 2020	Mascha Feoktistova	Jan Versteegh
3	25 January 2020	Tatum Dagelet	Milan Knol
4	1 February 2020	Klaas van Kruistum	Geraldine Kemper
5	8 February 2020	Thomas van Grinsven	Dionne Slagter
6	15 February 2020	Rick Brandsteder	Sterre Koning
7	22 February 2020	Shelly Sterk	Igmar Felicia
8	29 February 2020	Rijk Hofman	Iris Enthoven
9	7 March 2020	Tim Haars	Nina Warink
10	14 March 2020	Tim Senders	Quinty Misiedjan
