= Klaas van Kruistum =

Dutch television presenter (born 1976)

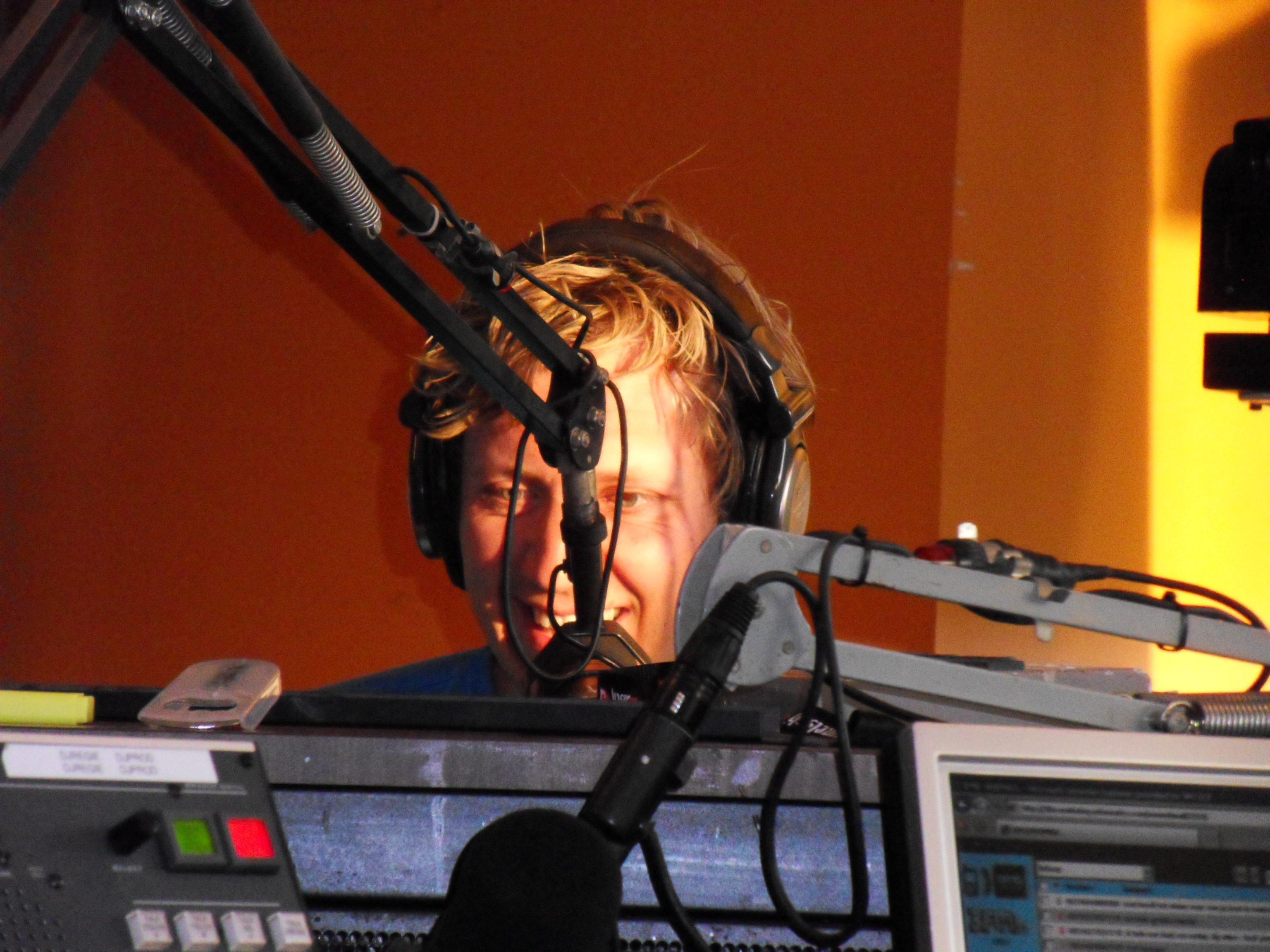
- Van Kruistum in 2009
- Born: 6 October 1976 (age 49)
- Occupation: Television presenter
- Known for: Checkpoint; Zapplive; Wie is de Mol?

Klaas van Kruistum (born 6 October 1976) is a Dutch television presenter. He presented shows for the Evangelische Omroep and since 2014 he presents shows for KRO-NCRV. He is also known for appearing in the reality television series Wie is de Mol?.

== Career ==
=== Television and film ===
Van Kruistum presented the children's show Checkpoint for the Evangelische Omroep (EO). The show won the Gouden Stuiver award for best children's show in 2014. Van Kruistum left EO in August 2014 and he began working for KRO-NCRV. Since 2015, he presents the show Klaas kan alles, a popular science show in which he attempts to complete challenges and difficult jobs.

In 2016, he renewed his contract with KRO-NCRV for two years. He also renewed his contract with KRO-NCRV for two years in 2018 and again in 2020 and 2022.

Van Kruistum participated in the 16th season of the popular television show Wie is de Mol? in 2016. He played the role of the mole. This season of Wie is de Mol? is known for a hint in the second episode which pointed to Klaas as the mole and which made his identity clear to many viewers very early in the season. Tim Hofman answered most questions correctly in the final and he won the prize money of €13,020. Van Kruistum presented the television show Beste vrienden in 2016 and 2017, a show in which two duos of Dutch celebrities travel to a destination abroad to compete in challenges.

Van Kruistum played a role in the 2021 film Berend Botje. It was his film debut.

His show Klaas kan alles was nominated for the Favoriete Zapp-programma award at the 2025 Zapp Awards. As a consequence, Van Kruistum was not able to present the award ceremony (with Britt Dekker) as he did in previous years and Daan Boom replaced him as presenter of the ceremony. Van Kruistum and Britt Dekker presented the 2026 Zapp Awards. He presented the 2026 show 40 dagen van je leven, a show about fasting, together with Anita Witzier.

=== Television appearances ===
Van Kruistum was a contestant in the 2014 quiz show De Nationale 2014 Test. He was a contestant in the Maestro Eén voor Kinderen television special in 2016, a single episode of the show Maestro in which contestants compete to become the best conductor. Van Kruistum appeared in a 2018 episode of the game show De Jongens tegen de Meisjes and in a 2020 episode of the quiz show Britt's Beestenbende. He was a contestant in a 2021 episode of the quiz show 10 voor Taal and a 2024 episode of the quiz show 30 Seconds.

=== Podcast ===
Since December 2025, he hosts the podcast Losse eindjes ('Loose ends') for KRO-NCRV. The podcast is about unfinished stories in people's lives.

=== Other activities ===
Van Kruistum is an ambassador for UNICEF since 2016.

In 2019, he was the procession reporter in that year's edition of The Passion, a Dutch Passion Play held every Maundy Thursday since 2011.

== Selected filmography ==
=== Film ===
- Berend Botje (2021)

=== As presenter ===
- Checkpoint
- Klaas kan alles (2015–present)
- Beste vrienden (2016–2017)
- 40 dagen van je leven (2026)

=== As contestant ===
- Wie is de Mol? (2016)
- Maestro Eén voor Kinderen (2016)
- De Jongens tegen de Meisjes (2018)
- Britt's Beestenbende (2020)
- 10 voor Taal (2021)
- 30 Seconds (2024)
