= Secret Story (Dutch TV series) =

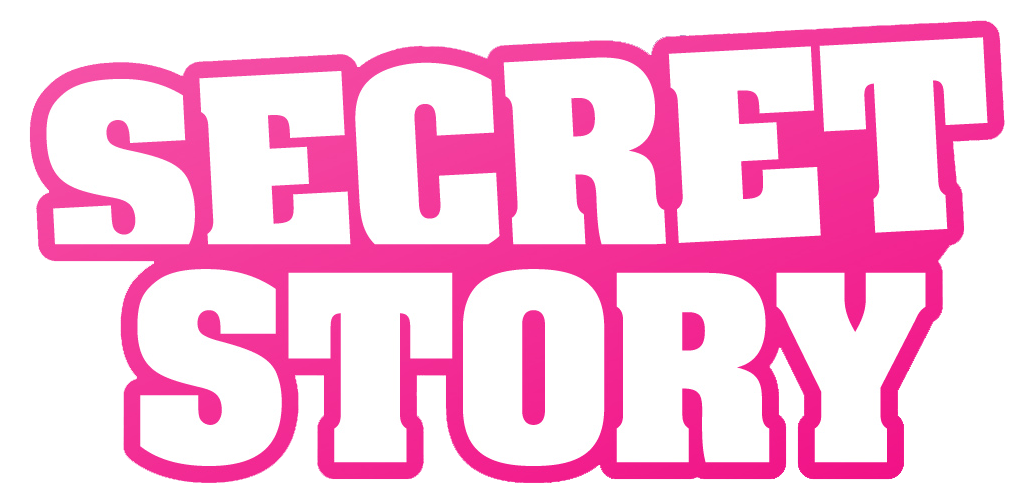
- Presented by: Renate Verbaan; Bart Boonstra
- No. of days: 91
- No. of housemates: 15
- Winner: Sharon Hooijkaas
- Runner-up: Philip Gransjean

Release
- Original network: Net5
- Original release: 13 February – 12 May 2011

Season chronology
- ← Previous; Big Brother 6

Secret Story 2011 is a Dutch reality competition television show based on the French series Secret Story and part of the franchise of the same name.

Like the original French version, the show is not a direct adaptation of the Big Brother franchise's format, which was also created in the Netherlands by producer John de Mol Jr. in 1997, but has a similar concept while including his own game mechanics, and is also produced and owned by Big Brother's production company Endemol Shine Group/Banijay Entertainment. The show started on 13 February 2011 on Net5. The host for the Galas is Renate Verbaan and for the Daily Diary is Bart Boonstra. The house is the same one used in the Portuguese version, although it has been redecorated for this version.

There were 15 housemates. The show lasted three months like the French and Portuguese versions, concluded on 12 May 2011 for a total of 91 days.

== Housemates ==
=== Aafke ===
I am a professional piercer

=== Alexander ===
On Day 7, it was revealed to the public that Alexander is a Knight.

=== Cynthia ===
Cynthia was evicted on Day 14 with 20% of the votes to save. After she was evicted, she confirmed her secret was that she had been homeless.

=== Gerard ===
During the live show on Day 14, Gerard's secret was revealed to the public as he is a millionaire.

=== Guido ===
When Guido and Laura entered the house on Day 1, they were given their secret - they are in a fake relationship.

=== Joanna ===
Joanna's secret was revealed on Day 1 - she is a sleepwalker.

=== Jurien ===
Jurien was the first housemate to be evicted on Day 7, where he revealed his secret: He used steroids once.

=== Karim ===
Karim has been in a Bollywood movie.

=== Laura ===
Laura entered the house on Day 1 and was told her secret was to be in a fake relationship with Guido.

=== Maik ===
Maik entered the house on day 1 and was the third evicted on day 21. He didn't need to leave the house. Instead, he was held in the Secret Chamber for the weekend whereafter he was allowed to return to the house and continue the game. The only sidenote is he can only keep half the money if he is the winner of Secret Story. Maik's secret is: he underwent a breast reduction.

=== Monique ===
Is gifted.

=== Philip ===
I had a romance with an Olympic gold winner Femke Heemskerk

=== Servio ===
I am a bingo-queen. his nickname was miss windy mills

=== Sharon ===
I survived the tsunami

=== Sofia ===
Grew up in an orphanage (her parents were inland skippers)

== Secrets ==
Housemates' secrets...

1. I am a millionaire

2. I am a bingo-queen

3. I am a professional piercer

4 / 5. Our relationship is a lie (for two people)

6. I've played in a Bollywood movie

7. I use steroids

8. I grew up in an orphanage

9. I had a romance with an Olympic gold winner

10. I am a Knight

11. I sleepwalk

12. I had a breast reduction

13. I am gifted

14. I survived the tsunami

15. I've been homeless

== Secrets unveiled to the public ==
Kick-Off Laura & Guido had imposed a new secret. The relationship between Laura and Guido is a lie. Joanna sleepwalking, which she at first told the broadcast room of the truth.

1 Elimination Show Alex told the House of Truth that he is a knight. Jurien ingested steroids, he tells Renata when he is eliminated.

2 Elimination Show Veronica Magazine is the premiere online at 16:00 to announce that Gerard millionaire. Cynthia has been temporarily homeless, she says that after she was eliminated.

3 Elimination Show "The Voice" Karim confronted with the fact that he's played in a Bollywood movie. Maik has had a breast reduction, he says that after he is eliminated.

4 Elimination Show Monique told the House of Truth that she is gifted. Sofia grew up in a boarding school, she says that after she was eliminated.

5 Elimination Show Sharon told the House of Truth that they survived the tsunami of 2004.

== Nominations ==
	Week 1	Week 2	Week 3	Week 4	Week 5	Week 6	Week 7	Week 8	Week 9	Week 10	Week 11	Week 12	Week 13		Nominations received
Sharon	Guido; Jurien	Not; Eligible	Alexander; Karim	Not; Eligible	Philip; Guido	Philip; Alexander	Not; Eligible	Maik; Philip	No; Nominations	3:Gerard; 1:Karim	Not; Eligible	4:Karim; 3:Joanna; 2:Monique; 1:Philip	Winner (Day 91)		13
Philip	Not; Eligible	Cynthia; Laura	Not; Eligible	Laura; Sharon	Not; Eligible	Servio; Karim	Sharon; Aafke	Karim; Gerard	No; Nominations	3:Joanna; 1:Monique	Not; Eligible	4:Joanna; 3:Monique; 2:Karim; 1:Sharon	Runner-Up (Day 91)		15
Karim	Not; Eligible	Cynthia; Sharon	Not; Eligible	Laura; Sofia	Not; Eligible	Servio; Philip	Joanna; Sharon	Philip; Joanna	No; Nominations	3:Gerard; 1:Sharon	Nominated	4:Sharon; 3:Monique; 2:Philip; 1:Joanna	Third Place (Day 91)		10
Joanna	Gerard; Jurien	Not; Eligible	Alexander; Maik	Not; Eligible	Karim; Maik	Aafke; Karim	Not; Eligible	Karim; Gerard	No; Nominations	3:Philip; 1:Sharon	Nominated	4:Philip; 3:Sharon; 2:Karim; 1:Monique	Fourth Place (Day 91)		10
Monique	Gerard; Philip	Not; Eligible	Alexander; Servio	Not; Eligible	Servio; Philip	Servio; Sharon	Not; Eligible	Karim; Gerard	No; Nominations	3:Laura; 1:Philip	Gerard; Joanna; Karim	4:Philip; 3:Sharon; 2:Karim; 1:Joanna	Evicted (Day 84)		1
Gerard	Not; Eligible	Aafke; Cynthia	Not; Eligible	Joanna; Sofia	Not; Eligible	Joanna; Servio	Joanna; Aafke	Joanna; Philip	No; Nominations	3:Karim; 1:Sharon	Nominated	Evicted (Day 77)			10
Laura	Gerard; Philip	Not; Eligible	Maik; Philip	Not; Eligible	Philip; Servio	Servio; Aafke	Not; Eligible	Philip; Karim	No; Nominations	3:Monique; 1:Sharon	Evicted (Day 70)				5
Maik	Not; Eligible	Cynthia; Laura	Not; Eligible	In Secret; Room	Not; Eligible	Joanna; Servio	Sharon; Aafke	Philip; Karim	No; Nominations	Evicted (Day 63)					4
Alexander	Not; Eligible	Aafke; Cynthia	Not; Eligible	Aafke; Sofia	Not; Eligible	Servio; Aafke	Aafke; Sharon	Philip; Joanna	Evicted (Day 56)						8
Aafke	Alexander; Gerard	Not; Eligible	Alexander; Servio	Not; Eligible	Alexander; Guido	Servio; Joanna	Not; Eligible	Evicted (Day 49)							10
Servio	Not; Eligible	Cynthia; Joanna	Not; Eligible	Laura; Sharon	Not; Eligible	Monique; Karim	Evicted (Day 42)								12
Guido	Not; Eligible	Cynthia; Sofia	Not; Eligible	Sharon; Sofia	Not; Eligible	Evicted (Day 35)									3
Sofia	Gerard; Jurien	Not; Eligible	Alexander; Gerard	Not; Eligible	Evicted (Day 28)										5
Cynthia	Gerard; Philip	Not; Eligible	Evicted (Day 14)												7
Jurien	Not; Eligible	Evicted (Day 7)													3
Notes			,	,		,		,							
Against public vote	Gerard; Jurien; Philip	Aafke; Cynthia; Laura	Alexander; Maik; Servio	Laura; Sharon; Sofia	Guido; ~~Philip~~; Servio	Gerard; Servio	Aafke; Joanna; Sharon	Alexander; Karim; Philip	Gerard; Maik; Sharon	Joanna; Laura	Gerard; Joanna; Karim	Karim; Monique; Sharon	Joanna; Karim; Philip; Sharon		
Evicted	Jurien; 30% to save	Cynthia; 20% to save	Maik; 27% to fake evict	Sofia; 22% to save	Guido; 49% to save	Servio; 22% to save	Aafke; 22% to save	Alexander; 21% to save	Maik; 29% to save	Laura; 28% to save	Gerard; 24% to save	Monique; 23% to save	Joanna ?% (out of 4) to win	Karim ?% (out of 3) to win	
Evicted	Jurien; 30% to save	Cynthia; 20% to save	Maik; 27% to fake evict	Sofia; 22% to save	Guido; 49% to save	Servio; 22% to save	Aafke; 22% to save	Alexander; 21% to save	Maik; 29% to save	Laura; 28% to save	Gerard; 24% to save	Monique; 23% to save	Philip; 45% (out of 2) to win		
Saved	Philip; 39% Gerard; 31%	Laura; 50% Aafke; 30%	Alexander; 38% Servio; 34%	Laura; 49% Sharon; 29%	Philip; 42% Servio; 51%	Gerard; 78%	Sharon; 40% Joanna; 38%	Karim; 39% Philip; 37%	Sharon; 36% Gerard; 35%	Joanna; 72%	Joanna; 48% Karim; 26%	Sharon; 51% Karim; 26%	Sharon; 55% to win		

Notes:

- ^1 In round one of nominations, only female housemates could nominate and only male housemates could be nominated.
- ^2 In round two of nominations, only male housemates could nominate and only female housemates could be nominated.
- ^3 In round three of nominations, only female housemates could nominate and only male housemates could be nominated.
- ^4 Maik gets a second change of "De Stem", Maik didn't leave the house but came in the Secret room.
- ^5 During the fourth round of nominations, Maik was in the Secret room and could not nominate.
- ^6 In round four of nominations, only male housemates could nominate and only female housemates could be nominated.
- ^7 In round five of nominations, only female housemates could nominate and only male housemates could be nominated.
- ^8 In round six of nominations, every housemate could nominate.
- ^9 Gerard gets nominated by "De Stem" because he took off the handcuffs in the handcuffs challenge.
- ^10 In round seven of nominations, only male housemates could nominate and only female housemates could be nominated.
- ^11 In round eight of nominations, every housemate could nominate.
- ^12 Alexander gets nominated because Laura failed to complete her challenge.
- ^13 In round nine of nominations there was no nomination because the losing team was automatically nominated.
- ^14 In round ten of nominations, every housemate could nominate to save, not evict. The housemates with the least support from their fellow housemates were nominated.

== Eviction Results ==
- Week 1: Philip (39%), Gerard: (31%) and Jurien: (30%)
- Week 2: Laura (50%), Aafke: (30%) and Cynthia: (20%)
- Week 3: Alexander: (38%), Servio (35%) and Maik: (27%)
- Week 4: Laura: (49%), Sharon: (29%) and Sofia: (22%)
- Week 5: Philip: (42%), Servio: (51%) and Guido: (49%)
- Week 6: Gerard: (78%) and Servio: (22%)
- Week 7: Sharon (40%), Joanna: (38%) and Aafke: (22%)
- Week 8: Karim: (40%), Philip (39%) and Alexander: (21%)
- Week 9: Sharon (36%), Gerard: (35%) and Maik: (29%)
- Week 10: Joanna: (72%) and Laura: (28%)
- Week 11: Joanna: (48%), Karim: (28%) and Gerard: (24%)
- Week 12: Sharon: (51%), Karim: (26%) and Monique: (23%)

== Housemates Individual Account Totals ==
The totals of the housemates individual bank accounts can be increased by passing individual tasks and discovering other housemates secrets. These totals can also be negatively affected by excessive rule breaking and having their (the housemate) secret discovered/revealing their secret.

Housemate	2/17/11	2/24/11	3/3/11	3/10/11	3/17/11	3/24/11	3/31/11	4/4/11	4/14/11	4/21/11	4/28/11	5/5/11	5/12/11
Gerard	€7,500	€4,500	€6,350	€3,850	€2,550	€3,550	€1,300	€1,000
Joanna	€5,000	€5,000	€6,400	€4,900	€2,200	€4,000	€6,388	€12,383
Karim	€5,000	€2,000	€2,400	€1,200	€2,750	€1,350	€2,650	€4,500
Laura	€5,000	€3,750	€3,750	€2,000	€1,650	€1,450	€2,650	€28,225
Maik	€5,000	€4,500	€4,900	€5,900	€6,100	€6,700	€7,133	€31,458
Monique	€5,000	€5,000	€7,900	€12,650	€13,110	€14,010	€17,810	€1,000
Philip	€4,000	€1,000	€5,700	€6,700	€4,000	€3,900	€1,200	€3,635
Sharon	€7,500	€5,000	€6,100	€4,600	€9,050	€10,750	€12,050	€2,500
Alexander	€7,500	€4,500	€6,500	€7,000	€4,800	€1,800	€2,200	€28,225
Aafke	€2,500	€6,000	€6,400	€12,400	€15,450	€14,550	€19,300
Servio	€5,500	€10,500	€8,100	€10,100	€12,800	€13,000
Guido	€2,000	€2,000	€2,000	€1,000	€16,425
Sofia	€10,425	€15,425	€13,325	€16,825
Cynthia	€2,000	€2,000
Jurien	€3,500
