= First & Last =

2020 British television game show

- Presented by: Jason Manford
- Country of origin: United Kingdom
- Original language: English
- No. of seasons: 1
- No. of episodes: 6

Production
- Running time: 45 minutes

Original release
- Release: 4 January – 15 February 2020

First & Last is a 2020 British television game show presented by Jason Manford. In the show, contestants that finish in first or last place (the most extreme values) are eliminated from the game.

The show consists of five rounds and in each round two players are eliminated. Each episode starts with eleven contestants and after five rounds only three contestants remain. In the final, each contestant writes down how much of the £10,000 prize money they wish to win; the contestant with the median amount wins that much prize money.

Britt Dekker and Martien Meiland presented a Dutch version of the show in 2021. The show was broadcast by SBS6. A Thai version of the show was broadcast by Workpoint TV.
