= De Club van Sinterklaas en de Race Tegen de Klok =

2022 Dutch film directed by Martijn Koevoets

- Theatrical release poster
- Directed by: Martijn Koevoets
- Written by: Martijn Koevoets
- Cinematography: Jorrit Garretsen
- Edited by: Ellemieke Middelhoff
- Music by: Co Vergouwen
- Distributed by: Dutch FilmWorks
- Release date: 12 October 2022 (Netherlands)
- Country: Netherlands
- Language: Dutch

De Club van Sinterklaas en de Race Tegen de Klok is a 2022 Dutch film written and directed by Martijn Koevoets. The film won the Golden Film award after having sold 100,000 tickets. It was the sixth best visited Dutch film of 2022 with just over 210,000 visitors.

Wilbert Gieske, Beryl van Praag and Anouk de Pater are some of the cast members of the film. Footballer Nathan Rutjes and presenter Britt Dekker also appear in the film.
