= We Want More =

Dutch singing talent television show

- Presented by: Wendy van Dijk (seasons 1 and 2); Johnny de Mol (season 1); Britt Dekker (season 2)
- Judges: Davina Michelle; André Hazes Jr.; Ali B; Trijntje Oosterhuis; Henk Poort
- Country of origin: Netherlands
- Original language: Dutch
- No. of seasons: 2

Original release
- Network: SBS6
- Release: 12 June 2020

We Want More is a Dutch singing talent television show presented by Wendy van Dijk and Johnny de Mol in 2020. Britt Dekker replaced Johnny de Mol as presenter in season two in 2021. The show was broadcast by SBS6.

Dennis Weening was backstage presenter in season one and Thomas van der Vlugt was backstage presenter in season two. Davina Michelle, André Hazes Jr., Ali B, Trijntje Oosterhuis and Henk Poort served as judge in the show.

Fado singer and guitarist Iris & Tiago won the first season of the show and they won a prize of 100.000 euros. Robin Borneman won the second season of the show.
