= Nathan Rutjes =

Dutch footballer (born 1983)

Personal information
- Date of birth: 1 December 1983 (age 42)
- Place of birth: Rotterdam, Netherlands
- Height: 1.83 m (6 ft 0 in)
- Position: Midfielder

Youth career
- CVV
- Alexandria '66
- Sparta Rotterdam

Senior career*
Years	Team	Apps	(Gls)
2005–2012	Sparta Rotterdam	91	(2)
2012–2014	MVV	54	(2)
2014–2018	Roda JC	46	(1)
2018–2019	Groene Ster	1	(0)
Total		192	(5)
- * Club domestic league appearances and goals

Nathan Rutjes (born 1 December 1983) is a Dutch former professional footballer. He formerly played for Dutch clubs Sparta Rotterdam, MVV and Roda JC.

== Club career ==
A midfielder, Rutjes was born in Rotterdam and made his debut in professional football, being part of the Sparta Rotterdam squad in the 2005–06 season. He is known for sporting a mullet, his optimism inside and outside the pitch, and his sportsmanship. He has been awarded various prizes for being an inspiring and exemplary athlete. He retired in 2019 as part of the amateur club RKSV Groene Ster.

== Television and film ==
In 2020, he appeared in the twentieth season of the popular television show Wie is de Mol?. He appeared in the 2022 film De Club van Sinterklaas en de Race Tegen de Klok. He also appeared in the third season of the television show De Verraders. He was a contestant in the 2025 anniversary season of the television show Wie is de Mol?. He was the mole of this season of the show.
