= Wendy van Dijk =

Dutch actress (born 1971)

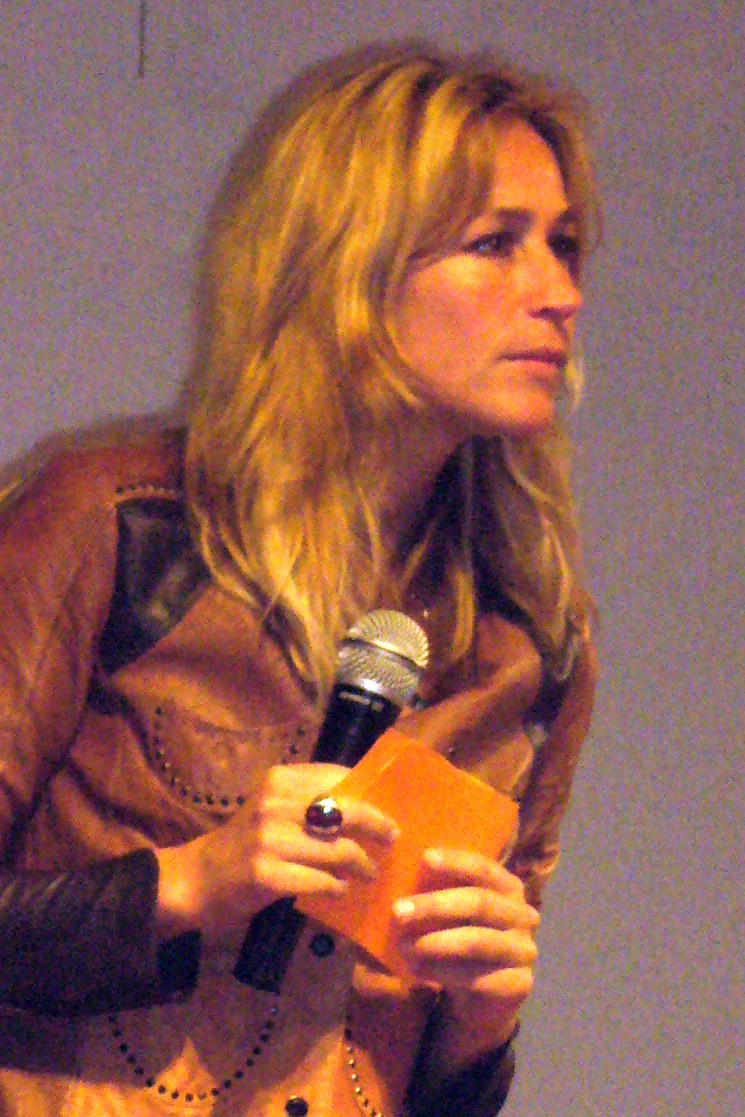
- Van Dijk in 2008
- Born: 12 February 1971 (age 55); Weesp, Netherlands
- Occupations: Actress; comedian; television presenter
- Years active: 1996–present
- Known for: Portrayal of Ushi Hirosaki
- Website: wendyonline.nl

Wendy van Dijk (born 12 February 1971) is a Dutch actress, comedian and television presenter. She is best known for her portrayal of Ushi Hirosaki, a hapless Japanese journalist featured in both a series of Dutch television shows and a theatrical film.

== Television ==
Van Dijk was born in Weesp in 1971 as the daughter of a market trader. Between 1996 en 1998, she presented, together with Renate Scholten and Matthias Scholte the SBS program Over de Rooie. Van Dijk presented the show Hart in Aktie between 2000 and 2006. In 2006, Van Dijk was a contestant on Dancing On Ice. In 2007 and 2008, she hosted the Dutch edition of Idols. The Netherlands edition of X Factor was the replacer of Idols, which Van Dijk has also hosted all five seasons of. Van Dijk co-hosted nine seasons of The Voice of Holland together with Martijn Krabbé, from 2010 to 2019, as well seasons 1–9 of The Voice Kids. From 2011 on, she hosted all three seasons of the Dutch TV show Obese, in which she and professional coaches and doctors help morbid obese people to successfully lose weight in three months. From 2013 to 2019, Van Dijk hosted the game show Wie ben ik? (Who am I?).

In 2018, she moved from RTL4 back to her old network SBS6. At SBS6 she presents the shows Dance Dance Dance, SuperKids, Wie Het Laatst Lacht, Hart in Aktie, We Want More and the Dutch version of Flirty Dancing. In 2021, Van Dijk and Jan Versteegh presented De Dansmarathon, a show in which contestants need to dance for fifty hours to win €100,000. Other Dutch celebrity duos also presented parts of the show. In 2025, she narrated the live event and television program The Passion.

=== Ushi Hirosaki ===
Van Dijk first appeared as Ushi in 1999, in Ushi en Van Dijk, a program that aired on the Dutch television channel SBS6. While appearing as Ushi, the actress puts on makeup, glasses, wears a "buckteeth" dental appliance and conceals her blonde hair under a dark wig. Segments featuring Ushi typically consist of Borat-style pranks on international celebrities while Van Dijk pretends to be a reporter for Good Morning Tokyo, a fictional television show. Among those interviewed by Ushi: Adele, Pamela Anderson, Christian Jessen, Donny Osmond, Geri Halliwell, Jamie Oliver, Jo Frost, Lionel Richie, Gino Vannelli, Inger Nilsson, Shannen Doherty, Billy Crawford, Ronan Keating and La Toya Jackson. The character's catchphrase is: "Solly, my Engrish is not so very bad!"

Ushi has inspired similar characters that have appeared on other television stations across Europe. Van Dijk appeared as Ushi again in Ushi Must Marry, a theatrical film released in the Netherlands on 14 February 2013.

Not only did Van Dijk feature the role of Ushi, she also appeared as Dushi, an Antillian weather forecaster for TeleCuraçao in the television series Ushi & Dushi in 2009. A year later, in 2010, the new television series Ushi & Loesie was aired, featuring Loesie, a stereotypical Amsterdam girl. Between 2011 and 2012, Van Dijk produced the television series Ushi & The Family, in which Ushi features again, as well as the Family Leenders, consisting of grandma Betsie Leenders, mother Gerda Leenders, daughter Bo Leenders and Esmeralda, all living in Tegelen. The concept of all shows stayed the same, since Ushi would interview non-Dutch celebrities, while the other characters did the same with famous Dutchmen.

Ushi's mannerisms and personality are based on common Asian and Japanese stereotypes. Ushi has been the subject of criticism. Bloggers have derided Ushi and describe her as a cruel and racist "yellowface" caricature. A review of Ushi Must Marry in the Dutch newspaper Het Parool drew further attention to the more controversial aspects of the character. "Then there are the racial stereotypes," wrote reviewer Mike Peek. "Sacha Baron Cohen as Borat makes you laugh at the people he approaches. His role is a cover. But in Ushi Must Marry the characters themselves are the main source of humor. Who laughs at a Japanese person unfamiliar with 'splaakgeblek,' especially in the year 2013?" NRC Handelsblad film critic André Waardenburg went even further and called the movie a "new low in Dutch film history." Following its release in theaters, Ushi Must Marry was widely panned by other film critics and it also sparked a discussion about the continued popularity of racial caricatures in Dutch culture.

In 2009 Van Dijk created a character called Lucretia Martina or Dushi; a black woman working in television from the Antilles. For this character Van Dijk, who is white, dressed up in blackface, for which she was called out as racist, and put on a fatsuit. Broadcaster RTL considered using Dushi to promote the island of Curaçao, which was 'greatly discouraged' by then Health and Education minister for Curaçao Omayra Leeflang. In 2019 Van Dijk again faced serious backlash and was again called out for being racist when she posted a picture of Dushi on Instagram for the #10yearschallenge. The post has since been removed.

== Selected filmography ==
FilmTelevision
Year	Title	Role
2001	Ushi Says: Hi!	Ushi Hirosaki
2007	Alles is Liefde	
2004	In Orange	
2013	Ushi Must Marry	Ushi Hirosaki
2012–2018	Moordvrouw	Fenna Kremer
