= Jan Versteegh =

Dutch television presenter (born 1985)

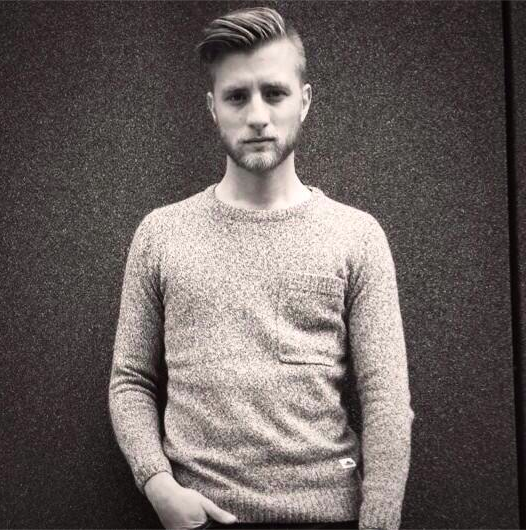
- Versteegh in 2013
- Born: 31 December 1985 (age 40); Rotterdam, Netherlands
- Occupation: Television presenter
- Known for: De Bondgenoten; Wie is de Mol?

Jan Versteegh (born 31 December 1985) is a Dutch television presenter and singer. He is known for presenting several television shows, including Proefkonijnen, Spuiten en Slikken and Lingo. He is also known for presenting the reality game show De Bondgenoten and for appearing in the reality television series Wie is de Mol?. He won the Televizier-Ring Presentator award for best presenter in 2026.

== Career ==
=== PowNed, BNN and BNNVARA (2012–2019) ===
Early in his career, Versteegh worked as a physical education teacher. In 2012, he became a reporter for the show PowNews by PowNed. He joined BNN in early 2014, which later became BNNVARA, the broadcasting association which formed as a merger of BNN and VARA; both organisations kept their separate identities for some time.

Versteegh presented various television programs which include Spuiten en Slikken, a show about sexuality and drugs, and Proefkonijnen, a popular science show in which the presenters try to answer questions from viewers. He presented Proefkonijnen together with Geraldine Kemper. A few years later, he presented the news and entertainment show 6 Inside, the game show Lingo and the game show Echt Waar?!. The show 6 Inside ended after one season.

Versteegh participated as contestant in the reality competition show Expeditie Robinson 2013. He was also a contestant in the singing competition show It Takes 2 (in 2016) and the quiz shows De Slimste Mens (in 2014), Weet Ik Veel (in 2016) and The Big Music Quiz (in 2017). He became the winner of his season of It Takes 2.

He won the Televizier Aanstormend Talent Award at the 2015 Gouden Televizier-Ring Gala. He was also nominated for this award in 2014. In 2015, Versteegh presented the show Jan is de Beste in which he competed against a Dutch celebrity in each episode. It was his first show as solo presenter.

In 2018, Versteegh played the role of the mole in the 18th season of the popular television show Wie is de Mol?. He was correctly identified by Ruben Hein who won the prize money of €17,750. Versteegh played a small role in the 2018 romantic comedy film Gek van Oranje directed by Pim van Hoeve. It was his film debut. He appeared as panel member in the 2018 season of the show Ranking the Stars presented by Paul de Leeuw, a show in which celebrities rank each other. Versteegh also presented the show Rijk! in 2018, a show about ways to earn money. In the show, he explores topics such as trading and gambling and asks multiple people for advice, including former footballer Demy de Zeeuw, co-founder of the brand BALR., coach and radio presenter Michael Pilarczyk and presenter and columnist Sander Schimmelpenninck.

=== Talpa Network (2019–present) ===
Versteegh began working for Talpa in January 2019. He was one of the team captains in the 2019 television game show Mars versus Venus, a quiz show about the differences between men and women. Versteegh was the team captain of the male team and Leonie ter Braak was team captain of the female team. In the same year, he presented the game show De Gordon tegen Dino Show in which two teams compete against each other. Gordon and Jandino Asporaat were the team captains.

He presented the 2020 quiz show BINGO! De 100.000 euro quiz. Martien Meiland also hosted part of the show. Versteegh also presented the show Klein maar Fijn in which contestants compete to create the best miniatures. In 2021, he presented the quiz show Iedereen is van de wereld with Britt Dekker and Leo Alkemade as team captains. In the quiz, each team has to answer questions which are based on interviews that were conducted with people around the world. In the same year, Versteegh and Viktor Brand competed as duo in the game show Code van Coppens: De wraak van de Belgen in which they need to escape from an escape room. Versteegh and Wendy van Dijk presented De Dansmarathon, a show in which contestants need to dance for fifty hours to win 100,000 euros. Other Dutch celebrity duos also presented parts of the show. Versteegh was one of the presenters of the 2021 show Missions Impossible in which people attempt to complete a challenge. Leo Alkemade, Hélène Hendriks and Dennis van der Geest were also presenters of the show.

In 2022, Versteegh appeared in the film Hart op de juiste plek directed by Bob Wilbers. He renewed his contract with Talpa in April 2022 for two years. In the same year, he was a contestant in an episode of the game show Think Inside the Box presented by Richard Groenendijk in which contestants have to guess what is inside a large box. He was also a contestant in the quiz show The Connection presented by Matthijs van Nieuwkerk. He appeared in the quiz alongside two other moles of Wie is de Mol?: Anne-Marie Jung and Jeroen Kijk in de Vegte. Versteegh and Sander Lantinga were contestants in a 2022 episode of the show Het Jachtseizoen. He also appears in the 2022 film De Grote Sinterklaasfilm: Gespuis in de Speelgoedkluis directed by Lucio Messercola.

Since 2023, he presents the reality game show De Bondgenoten in which contestants both collaborate and compete in challenges to win 100,000 euros. The contestants also live together in a villa in Lelystad, Flevoland, Netherlands. Tooske Ragas and Mark Schaaf have also presented the show when Versteegh was unable to do so.

In 2024, it was revealed that Versteegh was the whistleblower who in 2021 told journalist Dennis Schouten about singer Marco Borsato's alleged child molestation of an underage girl. Borsato was eventually charged with child sexual abuse in 2023.

Versteegh renewed his contract with Talpa in January 2024 for two years. He presented the reality television series Muscles & Brains in 2024. In the show, six men and six women compete in challenges that involve strength and intelligence. In 2024, Versteegh also presented the outdoor survival show No Way Back in which the contestants travelled through Norway. He was one of the presenters of the 2024 show De Beste Wensen in which the presenters make dreams come true. Since 2025, he presents No Way Back VIPS, a version of the show No Way Back with celebrities. The 2025 season of No Way Back VIPS was filmed in Romania and the 2026 season was filmed in Albania.

In 2025, he presented the game show Let's play ball in which contestants have to roll a large ball from one location to another. He renewed his contract with Talpa in July 2025. Versteegh and Airen Mylene presented the shows Alle Remmen Los! and Red Bull Stalen Ros in 2025. The show Alle Remmen Los! was filmed at Speedway Emmen in Emmen, Netherlands and contestants compete against each other by driving backwards or by driving with a caravan. In Red Bull Stalen Ros the contestants need to complete a course over water with a decorated bicycle (similar to the television show Te land, ter zee en in de lucht).

In 2026, he presented the show The Bicycle Race in which contestants cycle through India. In the show, six duos compete against each other and contestants include Josje Huisman, Arjan Ederveen and Anniek Pheifer. In May 2026, it was announced that he would present Vijf Dagen Vast, a reality game show in which contestants are tied together for five days. The show was cancelled in June 2026, less than a week before the show's first episode was scheduled to air.

In 2026, he won the Televizier-Ring Presentator award for best presenter. Thomas van Groningen and Tim Hofman were also nominated for the award. The show De Bondgenoten won the Gouden Televizier-Ring award.

== Awards ==
- Televizier Aanstormend Talent Award (2015)
- Televizier-Ring Presentator (2026)

== Personal life ==
Versteegh and his wife married in 2017 and they have two daughters. In 2022, he published the book Doodmoe & dolgelukkig about his experiences of being a father. He is an ambassador for the Ronald McDonald Kinderfonds.

== Selected filmography ==
=== As presenter ===
- Spuiten en Slikken
- Jan is de Beste (2015)
- Proefkonijnen
- Lingo
- Rijk! (2018)
- Echt Waar?!
- De Gordon tegen Dino Show (2019)
- BINGO! De 100.000 euro quiz (2020)
- Klein maar Fijn (2020 – 2023)
- Iedereen is van de wereld (2021)
- Missions Impossible (2021)
- De Dansmarathon (2021)
- De Bondgenoten (2023 – present)
- No Way Back (2024)
- Muscles & Brains (2024)
- De Beste Wensen (2024)
- Let's play ball (2025 – present)
- No Way Back VIPS (2025 – present)
- Alle Remmen Los! (2025)
- Red Bull Stalen Ros (2025)
- The Bicycle Race (2026)
- Premiejagers (2026)

=== As team captain ===
- Mars versus Venus (2019)

=== As contestant ===
- Expeditie Robinson (2013)
- De Slimste Mens (2014)
- Ranking the Stars (2015, 2016, 2018)
- It Takes 2 (2016)
- Weet Ik Veel (2016)
- Ik hou van Holland (2016, 2023)
- The Big Music Quiz (2017)
- Wie is de Mol? (2018)
- Britt's Beestenbende (2020)
- Code van Coppens: De wraak van de Belgen (2021)
- Think Inside the Box (2022)
- The Connection (2022)
- Het Jachtseizoen (2022)
- Make Up Your Mind (2023)
- Alles is Muziek (2023)
- Hart tegen Hart (2025)
- Pokerface (2026)

=== As actor ===
- Gek van Oranje (2018)
- Hart op de juiste plek (2022)
- De Grote Sinterklaasfilm: Gespuis in de Speelgoedkluis (2022)
