= Thomas Berge =

Dutch singer (born 1990)

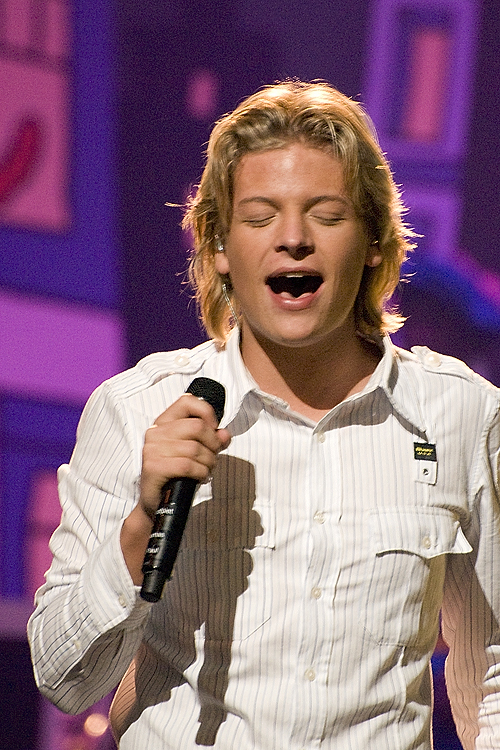
- Berge performing at Het Feest van Sinterklaas

Background information
- Born: Chiel Thomas Ottink; 25 January 1990 (age 36); Haaksbergen, Netherlands
- Origin: Enschede, Netherlands
- Years active: 2003–present
- Website: www.thomasberge.nl

Thomas Berge (born 25 January 1990), pseudonym of Chiel Thomas Ottink, is a Dutch singer.

== Biography ==
Thomas Berge was born in Enschede. He released his first single at the age of twelve. The album, Mijn Luchtballon, sold 800,000 promotional copies and was distributed by Neckermann. His stage name was chosen with the German music market in mind. In 2005 he was awarded the Zilveren Harp, the most prestigious award for promising new talent given in The Netherlands.

Berge together with Russian figure skater Nina Ulanova appeared in the program Stars Dancing on Ice where he lost to Geert Hoes in a skate-off on 10 March 2007, with 39% of the votes. In the same month, he was seen on television station TEN in the musical program 'Just the Two of Us'. The regional television station RTV Oost began a program on 2 June 2007 called "Toppers on Horses". It taught riding to Dutch celebrities. In October 2007 he recorded the single "De Stem van Mijn Hart" with Junior Contest Participant Tess Gaerthé. This is the Dutch version of the song "You are the Music in Me" from High School Musical 2.

He has made a number of television appearances throughout his career. Most notably, he stars in his own reality show, broadcast since 11 January 2008, on Dutch television station Nederland 1.

In 2008 he released his first single to enter the Dutch top 10, Zonder jou. This was followed shortly afterwards by Ieder moment which peaked at number 4 in the Dutch Single Top 100 chart and Kon ik maar even bij je zijn which was Berge' first number one single in The Netherlands.

Together with Roemjana de Haan he took part in the second Eurovision Dance Contest 2008 in Glasgow. They ended last with one point.

In 2009 he participated in the Dutch television program 'The Best Singers of the Netherlands' together with several other well-known Dutch singers. They took turns in singing each other's repertoire. During a vacation in Salou, Spain in the same year he became infected with the "Mexican Flu".

As of April 2022, he is scheduled to appear in the photography game show Het perfecte plaatje.

== Personal life ==
Thomas Berge lives in Alphen aan den Rijn, province Zuid-Holland . In 2010 it was announced in RTL Boulevard that Thomas Berge had checked in at a rehabilitation clinic. He has now addressed this issue. He began a relationship in 2012 with the five years older actress Myrthe Mylius known from the Dutch series 'Nederlandse Hollywood Vrouwen'. In June 2013 they welcomed their first child. The relationship with Mylius ended in July 2016.

His brother Rens is the drummer for English band Temples.

== Trivia ==
- On his left lower arm, Berge has a tattoo of his son's name, born 6 June 2013.
- In December 2011 in Gouda, Berge played the part of the apostle Peter in The Passion.
- In 2013 he broke with his discoverer and manager Johnny Sap after 12 year together.
- In January 2015 he wrote a song called ‘Wie zijn wij’ for the terrorist attacks in Paris.
- In 2015, a load of Thomas Berge's DVDs was found on the A27 highway in Netherlands. All were broken and the incident resulted in a big traffic jam.
- On 15 May 2016 vandals ravaged the front garden of his house in Alphen aan den Rhijn
- In August 2016 in Amersfoort, Berge lost control over his Mercedes Benz and crashed into a tree. Neither of the two occupants was seriously injured. The car was total loss.

== Discography ==
Album	Tracks A	Tracks B
Thomas Berge: Released: 2003; 14 May 2005; Format: CD; Label: T2 Entertainment Studio One	1 Als Jij Alles Kon Overdown (3:23); 2 Vraag Mij Wat Liefde Is (3:53); 3 Mama (2:31); 4 Net Als Jij (3:22); 5 Ik Geloof In Een Wonder (3:38); 6 Dromenland (3:28); 7 Ik Zie De Zee (3:31)	8 Morgen Klinken Bouzoukies (3:24); 9 Begin Elke Dag... (3:27); 10 Kon Ik Maar Onzichtbaar Zijn (2:54); 11 Ik Voel De Vlinders (2:14); 12 Geniet Van Kleine Dingen (3:16); 13 Mijn Luchtballon (4:01); 14 Als Jij Er Morgen Niet Meer Bent (3:24)
Als jij lacht: Released: 2004; 18 February 2005; Format: CD; Label: Studio One T2 Entertainment	1 Als Jij Lacht (3:34); 2 Sprookjesboek (3:16); 3 Por Favor (3:11); 4 Vanavond (2:48); 5 Later Als Ik Grotr Ben (3:24); 6 Zeg Mij Wanneer (3:31); 7 De Hele Wereld (3:15); 8 Als Ik Weer Thuis Kom (3:21	9 Santa Domingo (3:10); 10 Ik Zie Mijn Leven Als Een Melodie (3:48); 11 Waarom (3:14); 12 Zal Jij Later Mijn Geliefde Zijn (3:00); 13 Ik Mis Je Vriendschap (2:52); 14 Zonder Iets Te Zeggen (3:46); 15 Ik Wil Alleen Maar Vrede (4:10)
De mooiste: Released: 21 October 2005; Format: 2×CD; Label: T2 Entertainment Studio One	1 Als Een Mooie Droom (3:44); 2 De Mooiste (2:48); 3 Hasta Manana (3:16); 4 Regenboog (2:51); 5 Het Beloofde Land (3:38); 6 Si Yo Te Quero (3:07); 7 Hoe Zou Het Zijn (3:02)*	8 Voor Één Dag (2:56); 9 Ik Pluk Een Bluem (3:00); 10 Die Zomeravond (2:46); 11 Waarom Heb Je Mij Zo'n Pijn Gedaan (3:28); 12 Kalverliefde (3:19); 13 Kleine Vriend (3:27); 14 Hitmix (3:23)
Kerst met Thomas Berge: Released: 2005; 1 December 2006; Format: CD; Label: Studio One T2 Entertainment	1 Met Kest Neem Ik Jou Mee (3:23); 2 Het Kerstfeest Van Mijn Dromen (3:30); 3 Kon Het Maar Altijd Kerstmis Zijn (3:49); 4 Wonderlijke Kerst (4:13); 5 Ik Wens Jou Een Gelukkig Kerstfeest (3:32); 6 Een Pakje Met Jouw Naam (3:49)	7 Het Is Weer Kerstmis (3:18); 8 Kerst Is De Mooiste Tijd (3:44); 9 Kerstmedley (4:11); 10 Deze Kerst Ben Jij Alleen (3:26); 11 Stille Nacht (2:48); 12 De Ster Van Bethlehem (4:23)
Geloof in je dromen: Released: 10 November 2006; Format: 2×CD; Label: Studio One T2 Entertainment	1 Mijn Leven; 2 Geloof In Je Dromen; 3 Bellen; 4 Alleen Jij; 5 Lieveling; 6 Ik Wil Jou Dicht Bij Mij; 7 Hé Lieve Meid; 8 1000 Sterren	9 Frisse Melodie; 10 Lach Een Keertje Naar Mij; 11 De Sleutel Van Mijn Hart; 12 Heel Even; 13 Zing; 14 Regels Van Het Leven; 15 Jij Leeft In Mij; 16 Jij
Compleet: Released: 16 November 2007; Format: CD; Label: Studio One	1 Een nacht met jou; 2 Leef je dromen; 3 De ware liefde; 4 Compleet; 5 Als ze lacht; 6 Ik hou nog steeds van jou; 7 Jij; 8 Ik denk aan jou	9 Water en vuur; 10 Blijf vannacht; 11 Je bent zoals je bent; 12 Ik wil je nu; 13 Jij hoeft niets te zeggen; 14 Elke dag; 15 Ik leef als jij lacht; 16 De wereld; 17 Als de zon weer opgaat
Live in de HMH: Released: 26 September 2008; Format: 2×CD; Label: T2 Entertainment 99	1 Ouverture; 2 Jij bent mijn leven; 3 Bellen; 4 Een nacht met jou; 5 Jij leeft in mij; 6 Jij bent zoals je bent; 7 Compleet	8 De ware liefde; 9 Heel even; 10 De stem van mijn hart; 11 Als ze lacht; 12 Ik hou nog steeds van jou; 13 Leef je dromen
Kon ik maar even bij je zijn: Released: 30 October 2009; Format: CD; Label: Nrgy Music	1 Ieder Moment; 2 Kon Ik Maar Even Bij Je Zijn; 3 Ik Vertrouw Je Niet Meer; 4 Niets Houdt Me Tegen; 5 Te Laat; 6 Niets Te Veel	7 Hoe Troost Ik Jou; 8 Begrijp Mezelf Niet; 9 Bel Me; 10 Ok; 11 Never Knew; 12 Kon Ik Maar Even Bij Je Zijn (Acoustics)
1221: Released: 2 September 2011; Format: CD; Label: Nrgy Music	1 Niets is onmogelijk; 2 Kijkend naar mezelf; 3 Van jou en mij; 4 Mijn woord; 5 Op zoek naar liefde; 6 Zie jezelf	7 Vandaag; 8 't spijt me; 9 Geloof in jezelf; 10 Verleden tijd; 11 Je bent niet alleen; 12 My Own Way
Berge verzet: Released: 21 February 2014; Format: CD; Label: Cloud 9	1 Alleen Omhoog; 2 Zonder Jou (Voor jou alleen); 3 Morgen; 4 Zonder Haar; 5 Wat Ik Voel Voor Jou; 6 Onverwoestbaar	7 Kijk Om Je Heen; 8 Nooit Te Laat; 9 Licht Uit; 10 Alles Komt Goed; 11 Kleine Vent; 12 Alleen Omhoog (acoustic version)

=== Albums ===
Album title	Release date	Charting in the Dutch Album Top 100			Comments
Album title	Release date	Date of entry	Highest	Weeks	Comments
Thomas Berge	2003	25-10-2003	41	5	
Als jij lacht	2004	26-02-2005	20	22	
De mooiste	2005	29-10-2005	37	4	Compilation Album
Kerst met Thomas Berge	2005	-			
Geloof in je dromen	2006	18-11-2006	32	8	
Compleet	2007	15-03-2008	41	4	
Live in de HMH	2008	04-10-2008	46	4	Live Album
Kon ik maar even bij je zijn	30-10-2009	07-11-2009	10	8	
1221	02-09-2011	10-09-2011	8	6	
Berge verzet	2014	01-03-2014	9	4*	

=== Singles ===
Single title	Release date	Charting in the Dutch Top 40			Comments
Single title	Release date	Date of entry	Highest	Weeks	Comments
Mijn luchtballon	2003	-			Nr. 24 in the Single Top 100
Als jij er morgen niet meer bent	2003	-			Nr. 34 in the Single Top 100
Een glimlach	2004	-			Nr. 36 in the Single Top 100
Als jij lacht	2005	-			Nr. 46 in the Single Top 100
Ik zie mijn leven als een melodie	2005	-			Nr. 26 in the Single Top 100
De mooiste	2005	-			Nr. 45 in the Single Top 100
Als een mooie droom	2005	-			Nr. 54 in the Single Top 100
Jantjes gitaar	2005	-			with Johnny Hoes / Nr. 68 in the Single Top 100
Val aan	2006	-			Nr. 68 in the Single Top 100
Bellen	2006	-			Nr. 68 in the Single Top 100
Jij bent mijn leven	2006	-			Nr. 68 in the Single Top 100
Heel even	2007	-			Nr. 71 in the Single Top 100
De wereld ben jij	2007	14-07-2007	tip5	-	Nr. 35 in the Single Top 100 / Soundtrack Zoop in Zuid-Amerika
De stem van mijn hart	2007	06-10-2007	tip2	-	with Tess / Nr. 45 in the Single Top 100 / Soundtrack High School Musical 2
Niet meer en niet minder	2008	-			Nr. 48 in the Single Top 100
Zonder jou	2008	12-07-2008	tip6	-	Nr. 10 in the Single Top 100
Ieder moment	2009	25-07-2009	tip9	-	Nr. 4 in the Single Top 100
Kon ik maar even bij je zijn	09-10-2009	-			Nr. 1 in the Single Top 100 / Gold
Geen kerstfeest zonder jou	12-2009	-			Nr. 1 in the Single Top 100
Ik vertrouw je niet meer	02-2010	-			Nr. 7 in the Single Top 100
Niets te veel	14-11-2010	-			Nr. 14 in the Single Top 100
Mijn woord	30-04-2011	-			Nr. 8 in the Single Top 100
Niets is onmogelijk	2011	-			Nr. 8 in the Single Top 100
Alleen omhoog	2013	23-11-2013	tip3	-	Nr. 12 in the Single Top 100
Kerstmis vier je samen	2014	13-12-2014	tip25	-	as part of 'Eenmaal Voor Allen' / Nr. 68 in the Single Top 100

=== DVDs ===
DVDs with hit listing in the Nederlands Music Top 30	Date of release	Date of entry	Highest position	Number of weeks	Comments
Thomas Berge in Holland	2004				
Thomas Berge in Oostenrijk	2005				
Thomas Berge in Spanje	2005				
Live in de HMH	2008	04-10-2008	8	8	
