= Sofie van den Enk =

Dutch television presenter (born 1980)

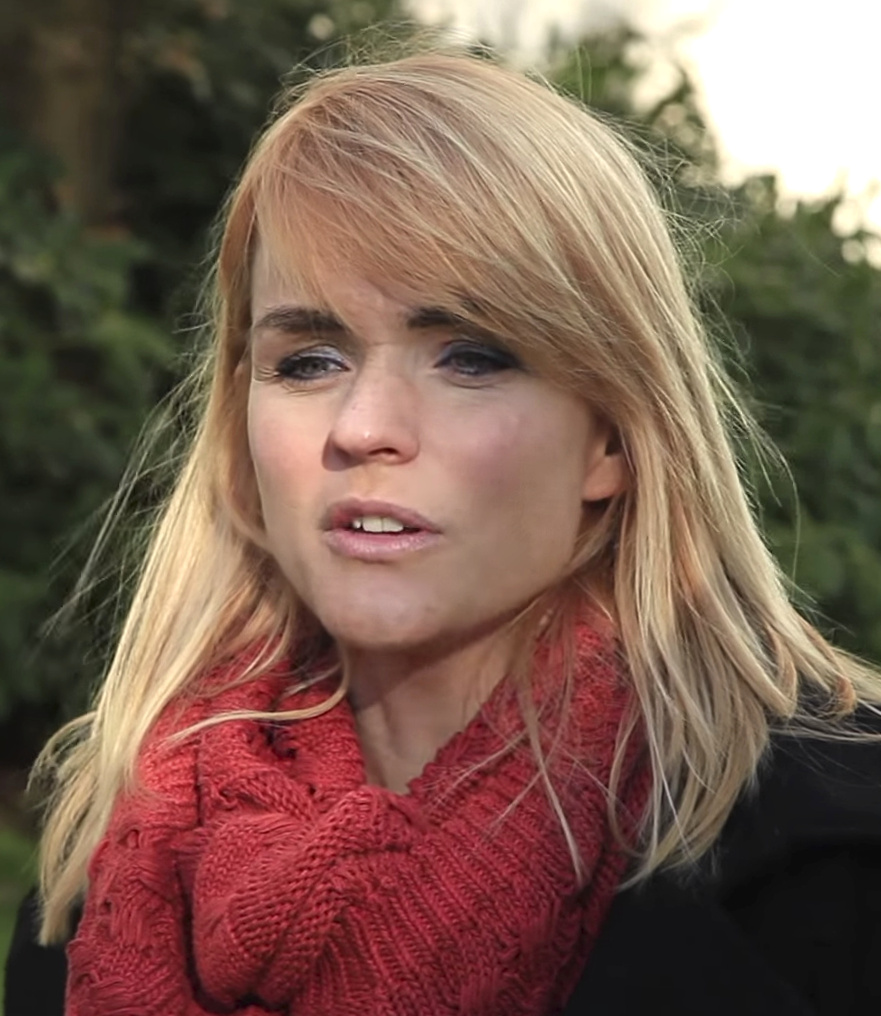
- Van den Enk in 2014
- Born: 23 August 1980 (age 45); Heemskerk, Netherlands
- Education: University of Groningen
- Website: sofievandenenk.nl

Sofie van den Enk (born 23 August 1980 in Heemskerk) is a Dutch television presenter who currently works for the KRO. Sofie graduated in 2006 from the University of Groningen and holds a master's degree in American Studies.

In early 2006, she began working as a reporter for regional television, RTV Utrecht, and later on she presented the daily newsmagazine of that channel called 'U Vandaag' (You Today). In 2007 and 2008 she also presented a program called 'Villa Hooiberg'.

In late 2008, 11 December, she won an award, Philip Bloemendal Award, for young presenters, the first presenter from regional television. Sinds 2009, works as a presenter on the public broadcasting organisation KRO.

She became a mother in 2011.

== TV appearances ==
=== KRO ===
- Ouders hebben geen Seks (2009)
- Geld speelt geen rol (2009)
- Hints (2010)
- Door 1 Deur (2010)
- PS Radio (2010 - )
- De Rekenkamer (2011 - )
- XXL (2011)
- Seinpost Den Haag (2011)

=== RTV Utrecht ===
- U Vandaag (2006–2010)
- Villa Hooiberg (2007 & 2008)
- Goed voor Elkaar (2008–2009)
- Uit met Sofie (2010)

=== VARA ===
- De Wereld Draait Door / Jakhalzen (2008–2009)

=== TV Gelderland ===
- Goed voor Elkaar (2010)
