= Misfit (2017 film) =

2017 Dutch film

- Theatrical release poster
- Directed by: Erwin van den Eshof
- Written by: Ernst Gonlag; Diana Sno; Karen van den Ende; Erwin van den Eshof
- Produced by: Erik Engelen; Andrew Ernster; Tarik Traida; Thomas Wolff
- Starring: Djamila; Bente Fokkens
- Cinematography: Jorrit Garretsen
- Edited by: Jeffrey De Vore
- Distributed by: Splendid Film
- Release date: 28 September 2017
- Running time: 86 minutes
- Country: Netherlands
- Language: Dutch
- Box office: $2.0 million

Misfit is a 2017 Dutch family film. The film earned $2.0 million dollars upon its initial release, making it the fourth most visited Dutch film of 2017. The film produced two sequels, a German remake, a Polish remake, a Latin American remake, and a television spin-off for Netflix.

== Plot ==
A popular American high school student moves to the Netherlands and is quickly cast out by her new peers as a 'misfit'.
