= Tim Douwsma =

Dutch singer (born 1987)

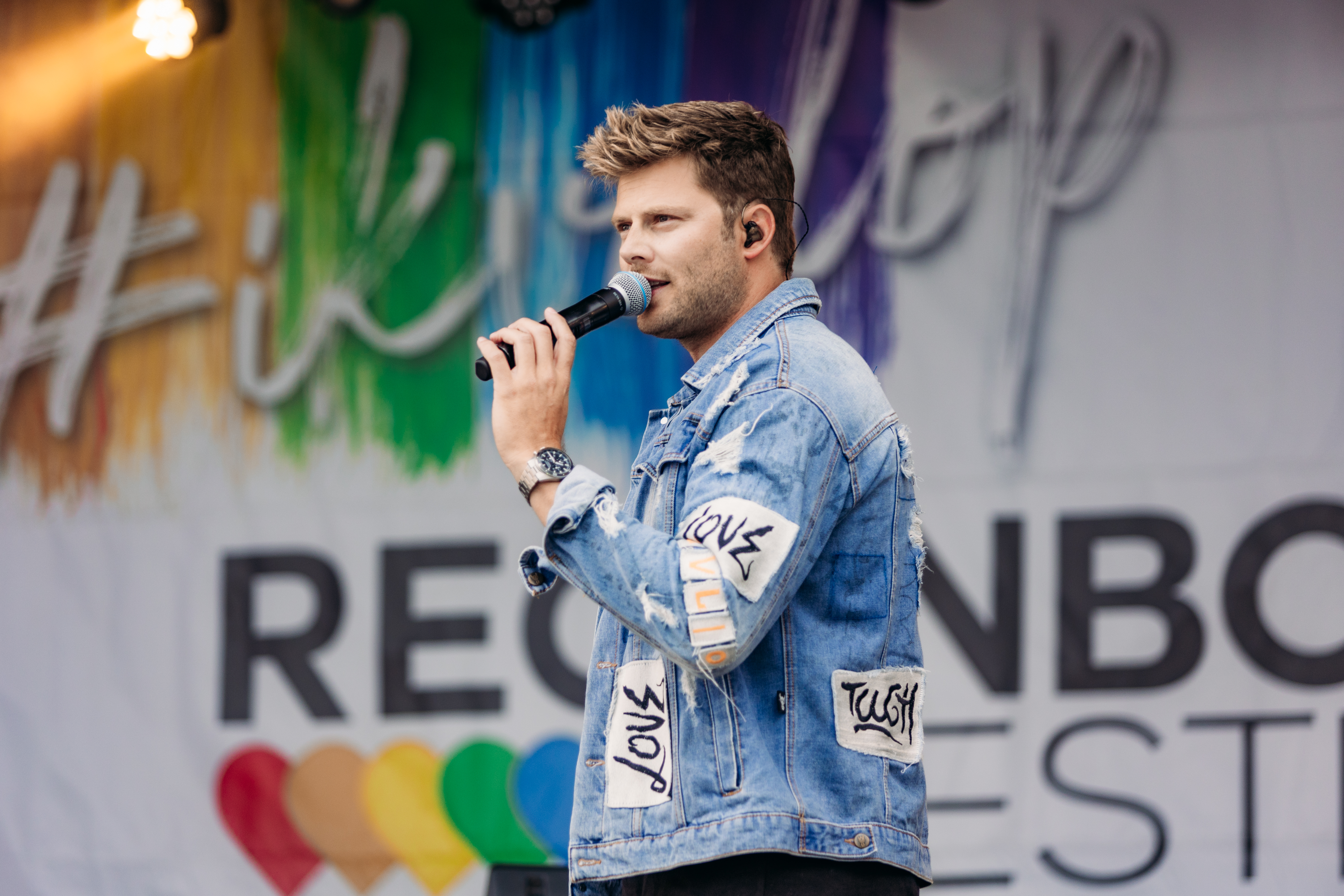
- Douwsma at "Rainbow Festival" in Emmen, 2022

Background information
- Born: 4 November 1987 (age 38); Drachten, Friesland, Netherlands
- Genre: Pop
- Occupation: Singer
- Years active: 2007–present
- Website: www.timdouwsma.com

Tim Douwsma (born 4 November 1987) is a Dutch singer. In 2007, he participated in the talent show So You Wanna Be a Popstar on Dutch television channel SBS6.

== Career ==
Douwsma was born in Drachten, Friesland, Netherlands. After graduation from high school, he studied at the CIOS, a sports training school, but stopped his training to focus more on a singing and acting career, as well as briefly modeling. In 2007, he took part in So You Wanna Be a Popstar finishing fifth overall. At the end of 2007, he recorded his debut single "Wil je bij me blijven slapen op" that reached No. 18 on the Single Top 100.

Signing with Roadstar Agency in February 2008, in April 2009, he released his second single "Ga", written by Joost Griffioen and Ray Klaassen (the Rocketeers). In late 2009, Douwsma landed a small role as Melle in the film De Hel van '63, directed by Steven de Jong.

In early 2010, Douwsma released the single "Je bent de hemel", a Dutch adaptation of the Spanish song "Yo No Sé Mañana" by Nicaraguan singer Luis Enrique. In February 2010, Douwsmae presented Tim op Tilt on Sterren 24 (sterren.nl), a specialty internet channel. He hosted the 2010 Sterren Awards with Monique Smit and Kees Tol. Tim op Tilt continued on Sterren until the closure of the station in September 2012. Douwsma also hosted the Karaoke Kids show on Z@pp.

In January 2011, he took part in Sterren Dansen op het IJs (Dancing Stars on Ice), but was eliminated in first round.

In January 2012, his song "Undercover Lover" was one of the 6 final entries for the Dutch entry in the Eurovision Song Contest. It was eliminated in the first round when competing against a song from Pearl Jozefzoon, a contestant from first season of The Voice of Holland. "Undercover Lover" reached No. 95 on the Dutch Single Top 100.

In December 2012, it was announced that Douwsma would release a joint album with Monique Smit in early 2013 and tour in the Netherlands and Belgium.

Douwsma appeared in series 5 of the Dutch reality television program De beste zangers van Nederland in February 2013.

In May 2014, Douwsma was the spokesperson for the Netherlands in the Eurovision Song Contest, announcing the results of the country's public and jury votes.

He was one of the team captains in the television quiz show Britt's Beestenbende presented by Britt Dekker.

== Discography ==
=== Singles ===
- 2008: "Wil je bij me blijven slapen"
- 2010: "Je bent de hemel"
- 2010: "Allebei"
- 2010: "Winter voor twee"
- 2011: "Eén zomeravond met jou" (with Monique Smit)
- 2012: "Undercover Lover"
- 2014: "Lisa"
- 2019: "Fryslân"

== Filmography ==
- 2007: Onderweg naar morgen (in 9 episodes as voice of Bink Broome)
- 2009: De Hel van '63 (English title The Hell of '63) as Melle
- 2017: Spaak as Luuk Meijer
