= Holland's Got Talent season 3 =

Holland's Got Talent
- Season 3
- Presented by: Robert ten Brink
- Judges: Dan Karaty; Patricia Paay; Gordon Heuckeroth
- Winner: Martin Hurkens
- Runner-up: Elastic Double

Release
- Original network: RTL 4
- Original release: 9 July – 10 September 2010

Season chronology
- Next → Season 4

The third season of the Dutch talent show Holland's Got Talent was broadcast from July 9, 2010, to September 10, 2010, on RTL 4.

This was the first season to be broadcast on RTL 4 (previous seasons were broadcast on SBS6) and therefore it had a different presenter and two new judging panel members. The presenter was Robert ten Brink, who replaced Gerard Joling from the previous years. After it was announced that Holland's Got Talent was going to RTL 4 and that Patricia Paay was staying on the panel as a judge, there was much speculation about who would be the other panelists. Names such as Albert Verlinde, Paay's ex-husband Adam Curry and Jacques d'Ancona were mentioned. Paay immediately made it clear that he did not want to work with d'Ancona, since he allegedly made indecent comments about Paay. It was eventually announced that the two other panellists alongside Paay were Gordon Heuckeroth and Dan Karaty. Karaty, having been a judge on the Dutch version of So You Think You Can Dance seemed a perfect fit for the role.

There was also a rivalry between Holland's Got Talent and the SBS6 talent show Popstars, (on which Patricia Paay had previously been a member of the panel) both being broadcast at the same time. However, the HGT judges and presenter Robert ten Brink made sure not to talk negatively about the rival show when asked about it in the media. Former judging panel member Henkjan Smits did congratulate RTL 4 after having a well received and highly viewed final for the show on September 10.

The first live show was broadcast on August 13, 2010. After much speculation from the media (including De Telegraaf), the show was eventually won by Martin Hurkens. Gordon told him that he could place himself next to Paul Potts and Susan Boyle (famous winners of the British counterpart of the show, Britain's Got Talent).

== Auditions ==
The auditions took place in May and June and were all held in one theatre. During the auditions, 64 acts were deemed live show worthy, however this was exactly double what could actually go through. The judges then deliberated which 32 acts could go through to the live shows. Since the judges couldn't decide on their outcome, seven acts were made to audition a second time, and as a result of this, three more acts made it into the final 32.

== Semi-finals ==
The act with the most votes earns a place in the final. From the two acts that come second and third, the judges will choose one more that will also go to the final. Each judge has their own vote that they can cast on one of the two acts.

=== Semi-finalists ===
Participant	Age(s)	Genre	Act	Semi-Final	Result
Adonis		Acrobatics	Acrogymnastics	2	Semi-finalist
Angelique Vanackere	35	Music	Opera singer	1	Finalist
A-tif en Suggest	24-24	Music	Hip-hop singers/rappers	1	Semi-finalist
Bart Juwett		Entertainment	Ventriloquist	2	Semi-finalist
Bas Olde Bijvank & Harald Wiersema		Music	Singing duo	3	Semi-finalist
Break Kidz	9-14	Dance	Breakdancers	3	Third Place
Christina Noordberger	29	Music	Musical singer	4	Semi-finalist
Crazy Violist	14	Music	Hip-hop violinist	1	Semi-finalist
Delano Vossen Houten	19	Music	Pianist	4	Semi-finalist
Dez		Entertainment	BMX-stunts	4	Semi-finalist
Drumband Heelsum		Music	Drum band	2	Semi-finalist
Elastic Double	23/20	Dance	Poppin and Lockin	2	Runner-up
Elke Rouwmaat	29	Music	Singer	3	Semi-finalist
Farid Rislani		Music	Singer	2	Semi-finalist
Harrie Harrewar		Entertainment	Duck Entertainer	3	Semi-finalist
155 - Eenvijfvijf (Ill Skill Squad)		Entertainment/dance	Comedy dancers	1	Semi-finalist
Jaqueline & Alex Glijn	32/42	Dance	Ballroom in a wheelchair	2	Finalist
Kim	9	Music	Singer	1	Finalist
Leanne Trienekens en Marieke Trienekens-Pellens	8/36	Dance	Riverdance	1	Finalist
Lera Razankova & Erik Feis	10/11	Dance	Ballroom	3	Semi-finalist
Martin Hurkens	57	Music	Opera singer	4	Winner
Megan Roele	14	Music	Singer	2	Semi-finalist
Michaël Betrian	14	Acrobatics	Diabolo	4	Semi-finalist
Miss Flora Gattina		Dance	Pole dancer	4	Finalist
Patricia Mulder	39	Music	Jazz singer	3	Finalist
Rebecca en Lotte	31	Entertainment	Dog Tricks	1	Semi-finalist
Sanne Croese	22	Dance	Belly dancer	3	Semi-finalist
Sim'Ran	23–24	Music	R&B girl group	4	Semi-finalist
Sniggy & Santios	24/26	Music	Beatboxers	2	Semi-finalist
Street4OnE		Dance	Hip-hop dancers	3	Semi-finalist
Team Unleashed		Entertainment	Freerunners	4	Semi-finalist
X Vibe		Dance	Hip-hop dancers	1	Semi-finalist

=== Semi-final summary ===
Buzzed out | Judges' vote | Advanced - Public Vote
Advanced - Judges' Vote | Eliminated - Judges' Vote | Eliminated

==== Semi-final 1 (August 13, 2010) ====
Semi-Finalist	Order	Buzzes and Judges' Vote			Result
Semi-Finalist	Order	Heuckeroth	Paay	Karaty	Result
X Vibe	1				Eliminated
Kim	2				Advanced (Won Judges' Vote)
Crazy Violinist	3				Eliminated
Rebecca and Lotte	4				Eliminated
Leanne and Marieke	5				Advanced (Won Judges' Vote)
A-tif and Suggest	6				Eliminated
155 - One Five Five (Ill Skill Squad)	7				Eliminated
Angelique Vanackere	8				Advanced (Won Public Vote)

- The judges couldn't decide between the second and third place contestants. Paay decided with to choose Kim, and Karaty decided to choose Leanne and Marieke, (however only on the basis that he didn't have to make a decision). Gordon couldn't choose and decided in consultation with Paay and Karaty that both acts would move on.

==== Semi-final 2 (August 20, 2010) ====
Semi-Finalist	Order	Buzzes and Judges' Vote			Result
Semi-Finalist	Order	Heuckeroth	Paay	Karaty	Result
Drum band Heelsum	1				Eliminated
Megan Roele	2				Eliminated (Lost Judges' Vote)
Sniggy & Santios	3				Eliminated
Adonis	4				Eliminated
Farid Rislani	5				Eliminated
Jaqueline & Alex Glijn	6				Advanced (Won Judges' Vote)
Elastic Double	7				Advanced (Won Public Vote)
Bart Juwett	8				Eliminated

==== Semi-final 3 (August 27, 2010) ====
Semi-Finalist	Order	Buzzes and Judges' Vote			Result
Semi-Finalist	Order	Heuckeroth	Paay	Karaty	Result
Street4OnE	1				Eliminated
Elke Rouwmaat	2				Eliminated
Lera Razankova & Erik Feis	3				Eliminated
Patricia Mulder	4				Advanced (Won Judges' Vote)
Harrie Harrewar	5				Eliminated
Sanne Croese	6				Eliminated
Bas Olde Bijvank & Harald Wiersema	7	/			Eliminated (Lost Judges' Vote)
Break Kidz	8				Advanced (Won Public Vote)

==== Semi-final 4 (September 3, 2010) ====
Semi-Finalist	Order	Buzzes and Judges' Vote			Result
Semi-Finalist	Order	Heuckeroth	Paay	Karaty	Result
Michael Betrian	1				Eliminated (Lost Judges' Vote)
Sim'Ran	2				Eliminated
Team Unleashed	3				Eliminated
This	4				Eliminated
Christina Noordberger	5				Eliminated
Delano Foxes Wooden	6				Eliminated
Miss Flora Gattina	7				Advanced (Won Judges' Vote)
Martin Hurkens	8				Advanced (Won Public Vote)

=== Final (September 10, 2010) ===
- Guest performance: Los Angeles: The Voices

Winner | Runner-up

Finalist	Order	Result
Break Kidz	1	3rd
Patricia Mulder	2	8th
Miss Flora Gattina	3	4th
Leanne and Marieke	4	7th
Angelique Vanackere	5	6th
Martin Hurkens	6	1st
Jaqueline & Alex	7	9th
Kim	8	5th
Elastic Double	9	2nd

=== Ratings ===
Show	Date	Viewers	Weekly rank
Auditions 1	July 9	1,007,000	4
Auditions 2	July 16	1,071,000	5
Auditions 3	July 23	1,274,000	2
Auditions 4	July 30	1,424,000	2
Best of Auditions	August 6	1,396,000	2
Semi-final 1	August 13	1,744,000	2
Semi-final 2	August 20	1,424,000	2
Semi-final 3	August 27	1,830,000	2
Semi-final 4	September 3	1,904,000	2
Final	September 10	2,588,000	1
Season Average	2010	1,566,000	2
