= Los Angeles: The Voices =

Netherlands-based singing group

- Origin: Hilversum, Netherlands
- Genres: Pop, Classic
- Years active: 2010–present
- Labels: Sony
- Members: Robbert Besselaar; Richy Brown; Roy van den Akker; Peter William Strykes
- Past members: Remko Harms; Gordon Heuckeroth
- Website: web.archive.org/web/20120823192054/http://www.losangelesmusic.nl/

Los Angeles: The Voices, often shortened to LA: The Voices, is the name of a group of four male singers based in the Netherlands. The original group, founded by Gordon Heuckeroth who left the group in 2013, consisted of Heuckeroth, Remko Harms, Richy Brown, Roy van den Akker, and Peter William Strykes. Robbert Besselaar replaced original member Remko Harms in January 2016. It is a vocal band with classic musicals and trained men who bring a repertoire that is a cross between the British Il Divo and Marco Borsato.

On December 6 the group received an award at the Carré for their eponymous debut album; it was their first gold album, having sold over 25,000 copies since its November 19 debut. On New Year's Day 2011 a recording of the concert aired on RTL 4.

== Background ==
During Uitmarkt 2010, Los Angeles, The Voices was scheduled to perform but because of bad weather, the performance was canceled.

The first single, "Stay Safe with Me," appeared on 10 September 2010, the same night it was heard during their debut performance in the finals of Holland's Got Talent with Gordon in the designation process. From the moment the single was available to download, it reached third place in the Top 200 downloads of iTunes. Nor were they during the week promotion that appeared in Life4You and Coffee and heard on 100% NL. Gordon has indicated that he wants his group to win the contest.

On November 1, 2010 the group's debut album Los Angeles was scheduled to be released. This was moved to November 19 because of the death of Gordon's mother. The first single is "Stay safe with me," a Dutch translation (by Gordon) of an Afrikaans composition by Sean and Niel Schoonbee Buttler, both from South Africa. The album features 13 songs; Gordon wrote the title song and the lyrics of eight other songs. The album also features a Spanish song, "Tu me das Alas," with lyrics by Alma Nieto.

On December 6 Carré group received from the hands of Tineke de Nooij a gold record for selling more than 25,000 albums. The evening concert was broadcast on New Year's Eve 2010. In May 2011 they were guests at the concerts in the Amsterdam Arena for the Toppers.

On March 14, 2013 it was announced that the group's founder, Gordon Heuckeroth—better known by his stage name Gordon, would be stepping out of the group. Gordon was too busy with his own solo career and did not want to stand in the way of the success of the group. His last performance with the band was on March 31, 2013.

== Discography ==
Year	Album details	Peak	Certifications (sales threshold)
Year	Album details	NL	Certifications (sales threshold)
2010	Los Angeles: Release date: 19 November 2010; Label: Sony BMG	1	NL: Platinum
2011	Mijn Laatste Lied Voor Jou: Release date: 5 July 2011; Label: Sony BMG; CD Single; two tracks	1	
2011	Because we Believe: Release date: 4 November 2011; Label: Sony BMG	1	NL: Gold
2011	A Christmas Spectacular: Release date: 20 December 2011; Label: Sony BMG	1	
2013	Geloof, hoop en liefde: Release date: 24 January 2013; Label: Sony BMG	1	
2013	Dit zijn wij: Release date: 30 November 2013; Label: Sony BMG	1	
