= Holland's Got Talent =

Dutch television series

- Genre: Reality; Talent contest
- Created by: Simon Cowell
- Presented by: Jamai Loman; Buddy Vedder
- Judges: Robert Ronday; Patricia Paay; Henkjan Smits; Gordon Heuckeroth; Dan Karaty; Chantal Janzen; Angela Groothuizen; Paul de Leeuw; Ali B Marc-Marie Huijbregts; Edson da Graça; Soundos El Ahmadi
- Original languages: Dutch; English

Original release
- Network: SBS6 (2008–09); RTL 4 (2010–)
- Release: March 28, 2008 – November 7, 2025

Holland's Got Talent (often referred to as HGT) is the Dutch version of the Got Talent series, which was created by Simon Cowell, who also created the series The X Factor. The first season began broadcasting in March 2008 on SBS6.

This television program looks for a new talent of all ages. The auditions of Holland's Got Talent take place on a stage in front of a large audience. The jury currently consists of Chantal Janzen, Marc-Marie Huijbregts, Soundos El Ahmadi and Dan Karaty. The first two seasons of Holland's Got Talent were presented by Gerard Joling. Robert ten Brink presented seasons 3 up to 7 and starting from season eight Johnny de Mol will be presenting the show as Robert ten Brink is too busy with his own programs, and the program was due for a refreshening. Candidates must display their "talent" for the jury and an audience. The jury assesses the performance and if the talent is good enough for the live shows. Eventually the last 40 candidates or acts will compete in the three or four live shows for the finals. To date, there have been fifteen winners: Danielle Bubberman, Tessa Kersten, Martin Hurkens, Aliyah Kolf, DDF Crew, Amira Willighagen, Leon Lissitza, Nick Nicolai, The Fire, Shinshan, Tommy & Rowan, CDK JR, Rick & Aimeé, World of Afro, & Vladyslav en Veronika. Each winner received a different prize.

SBS6 first chose the name Got Talent, but it was nevertheless changed to Holland's Got Talent later. SBS6 announced on March 16, 2010, that the station would not adopt a new season of Holland's Got Talent. The program was officially adopted in 2010 by RTL.

The original lineup of the jury panel consisted of Henkjan Smits, Patricia Paay and Robert Ronday. After the show was taken over by RTL, Smits and Ronday were forced to say goodbye to the show. They were then replaced by Idols and X Factor judge Gordon Heuckeroth and So You Think You Can Dance judge Dan Karaty. Over the years, the jury panel has changed multiple times.

== Seasons ==
Season	Start	Finale	Winner	Runner-up	3rd Place	Presenter	Judges
1	28 March 2008	30 May 2008	Danielle Bubberman	Waylon	Mario Veltman	Gerard Joling	Robert Ronday; Patricia Paay; Henkjan Smits
2	27 March 2009	29 May 2009	Tessa Kersten	Lars de Rijck	Groove Kings	Gerard Joling	Robert Ronday; Patricia Paay; Henkjan Smits
3	9 July 2010	10 September 2010	Martin Hurkens	Elastic Double	Break Kidz	Robert ten Brink	Dan Karaty; Patricia Paay; Gordon Heuckeroth
4	15 July 2011	16 September 2011	Aliyah Kolf	Boy Looijen	Opera Familia	Robert ten Brink	Dan Karaty; Patricia Paay; Gordon Heuckeroth
5	30 March 2012	1 June 2012	DDF Crew	No Escape XXL	The Ruggeds	Robert ten Brink	Dan Karaty; Patricia Paay; Gordon Heuckeroth
6	26 October 2013	28 December 2013	Amira Willighagen	Reality	Opa Piet	Robert ten Brink	Dan Karaty; Chantal Janzen; Gordon Heuckeroth
7	23 August 2014	25 October 2014	Léon Lissitza	Liptease	J'Chanel	Robert ten Brink	Dan Karaty; Chantal Janzen; Gordon Heuckeroth
8	8 April 2016	3 June 2016	Nick Nicolai	Mart Hoogkamer	Lost Dynasty	Johnny de Mol	Dan Karaty; Chantal Janzen; Angela Groothuizen; Gordon Heuckeroth
9	28 April 2017	23 June 2017	The Fire	Black Swords	Daniël	Johnny de Mol	Dan Karaty; Chantal Janzen; Angela Groothuizen; Gordon Heuckeroth
10	5 January 2019	15 March 2019	Shinshan	Pietje Tomassen	Adinda	Humberto Tan	Angela Groothuizen; Dan Karaty; Chantal Janzen; Paul de Leeuw
11	August 29, 2020	October 31, 2020	Tommy & Rowan	Romain Doedens	Amber Karstens	Humberto Tan	Ali B Angela Groothuizen; Chantal Janzen; Paul de Leeuw
12	2 September, 2022	28 October, 2022	CDK JR	Super Skaters	Eline van Dijk	Jamai Loman; Buddy Vedder	Marc-Marie Huijbregts; Chantal Janzen; Dan Karaty; Edson da Graça
13	1 September, 2023	3 November, 2023	Rick & Aimeé	Iron	Matthijs	Jamai Loman; Buddy Vedder	Marc-Marie Huijbregts; Chantal Janzen; Dan Karaty; Edson da Graça
All Stars	30 December, 2023		All 8 candidates 'won' this episode.			Jamai Loman; Buddy Vedder	Marc-Marie Huijbregts; Chantal Janzen; Dan Karaty; Edson da Graça
14	6 September, 2024	8 November, 2024	World of Afro	diamond baritones	jenske	Jamai Loman; Buddy Vedder	Marc-Marie Huijbregts; Chantal Janzen; Dan Karaty; Edson da Graça
15	5 September, 2025	7 November, 2025	Vladyslav en Veronika	Tha Boyz	Tiyana	Jamai Loman; Buddy Vedder	Marc-Marie Huijbregts; Chantal Janzen; Dan Karaty; Soundos El Ahmadi

== Judges and hosts ==
Season	Host	Judges (in order of first appearance)			
1	Gerard Joling	Robert Ronday	Patricia Paay	Henkjan Smits	—N/a
2	Gerard Joling	Robert Ronday	Patricia Paay	Henkjan Smits	—N/a
3	Robert ten Brink	Gordon Heuckeroth	Patricia Paay	Dan Karaty	—N/a
4	Robert ten Brink	Gordon Heuckeroth	Patricia Paay	Dan Karaty	—N/a
5	Robert ten Brink	Gordon Heuckeroth	Patricia Paay	Dan Karaty	—N/a
6	Robert ten Brink	Gordon Heuckeroth	Chantal Janzen	Dan Karaty	—N/a
7	Robert ten Brink	Gordon Heuckeroth	Chantal Janzen	Dan Karaty	—N/a
8	Johnny de Mol	Gordon Heuckeroth	Chantal Janzen	Dan Karaty	Angela Groothuizen
9	Johnny de Mol	Gordon Heuckeroth	Chantal Janzen	Dan Karaty	Angela Groothuizen
10	Humberto Tan	Paul de Leeuw	Chantal Janzen	Dan Karaty	Angela Groothuizen
11	Humberto Tan	Paul de Leeuw	Chantal Janzen	Ali B	Angela Groothuizen
12	Jamai Loman; Buddy Vedder	Marc-Marie Huijbregts	Chantal Janzen	Dan Karaty	Edson da Graça
13	Jamai Loman; Buddy Vedder	Marc-Marie Huijbregts	Chantal Janzen	Dan Karaty	Edson da Graça
All Stars	Jamai Loman; Buddy Vedder	Marc-Marie Huijbregts	Chantal Janzen	Dan Karaty	Edson da Graça
14	Jamai Loman; Buddy Vedder	Marc-Marie Huijbregts	Chantal Janzen	Dan Karaty	Edson da Graça
15	Jamai Loman; Buddy Vedder	Marc-Marie Huijbregts	Chantal Janzen	Dan Karaty	Soundos El Ahmadi
