= Holland's Got Talent season 10 =

Holland's Got Talent
- Season 10
- Winner: Shinshan
- Runner-up: Pietje Thomas

Release
- Original network: RTL 4
- Original release: 5 January – 15 March 2019

Season chronology
- ← Previous; Season 9

Holland's Got Talent 2019 is the tenth season of Holland's Got Talent and is broadcast on RTL 4 between 5 January 2019 to March 2019 presenter for this season is Humberto Tan the judges are Dan Karaty, Chantal Janzen, Angela Groothuizen and Paul de Leeuw replaced Gordon Heuckeroth on the judging panel.

The season was won by 17-year old breakdancer Shinshan.

== Semifinals summary ==
- Winner
- Runner-up
- Third place
- Golden Buzzer
- Judges' Pick

Name of act	Act	Semifinal Week	Result
Shinshan	Dancer	4	Winner
Pietje Thomas	Singer	1	Runner-up
Adinda	Violinist	3	3rd Place
BreakSquad	Dance Group	1	Finalist
Trinxx	Dance Group	2	Finalist
Pheasant Pluckers	Band	2	Finalist
Sanne Pronk	Singer	3	Finalist
Ripley	Opera Singer	4	Finalist
Kayden	Singer	Withdrew	Eliminated
Chimene	Singer	3	Eliminated
Sebastian	Dancer	1	Eliminated
Tough Kiddo's	Dance Group	1	Eliminated
Robin Matrix	Magician	1	Eliminated
Operakoor Almere	Opera Group	1	Eliminated
Serdi & Nicky	Singer And Beatboxer	1	Eliminated
Sara Suvaal	Singer	1	Eliminated
Candymen	Dance Group	1	Eliminated
Fleur	Dancer	2	Eliminated
Lex	Singer	2	Eliminated
Famile Shulha	Ballroom Dance Group	2	Eliminated
Magic Mike	Magician	2	Eliminated
Jaidy	Singer	2	Eliminated
Bart Hoving	Juggler	2	Eliminated
Wildcats	Dance Group	3	Eliminated
Mannes	Singer/Pianist	3	Eliminated
Virgil Nagel	Acrobat	3	Eliminated
Dance2Move	Dance Group	3	Eliminated
Wushu Team	Karate Group	3	Eliminated
Bob & Jair	Dance Duo	3	Eliminated
Pigeon Crew	Dance Group	4	Eliminated
Martijn Joostema	Singer	4	Eliminated
Freddy Burrows	Acrobat	4	Eliminated
Justin & Tosca	Dance Duo	4	Eliminated
Nick	Juggler	4	Eliminated
Sichi Yang	Singer	4	Eliminated
Miki Dark	Magician	4	Eliminated

== Semi-final rounds ==
The semi-finals premiered on 16 February 2019 two acts will make it through to the grand final each week

=== Semi-final 1 (16 February 2019) ===
Order	Artist	Act	Buzzes				Finished
Order	Artist	Act	Angela	Dan	Chantal	Paul	Finished
1	Tough Kiddo's	Dance Group					Eliminated
2	Pietje Thomas	Singer					Advanced
3	Robin Matrix	Magician					Eliminated
4	BreakSquad	Dance Group					Advanced
5	Operakoor Almere	Opera Group					Eliminated
6	Serdi & Nicky	Singer And Beatboxer					Eliminated
7	Sebastian	Dancer					Eliminated
8	Sara Suvaal	Singer					Eliminated
9	Candymen	Dance Group					Eliminated

=== Semi-final 2 (23 February 2019) ===
Order	Artist	Act	Buzzes				Finished
Order	Artist	Act	Angela	Dan	Chantal	Paul	Finished
1	Fleur	Dancer					Eliminated
2	Lex	Singer					Eliminated
3	Trinxx	Dance Group					Advanced
4	Pheasant Pluckers	Band					Advanced
5	Famile Shulha	Ballroom Dance Group					Eliminated
6	Magic Mike	Magician					Eliminated
7	Jaidy	Singer					Eliminated
8	Bart Hoving	Juggler					Eliminated

== Grand Final (15 March 2019) ==
Order	Artist	Act	Result
	Shinshan	Dancer	Winner
	Pietje Thomas	Singer	Runner-up
	Adinda	Violinist	3rd Place
	BreakSquad	Dance Group	Finalist
	Trinxx	Dance Group	Finalist
	Pheasant Pluckers	Band	Finalist
	Sanne Pronk	Singer	Finalist
	Ripley	Opera Singer	Finalist
