= Holland's Got Talent season 8 =

Holland's Got Talent
- Season 8
- Hosted by: Johnny de Mol
- Judges: Dan Karaty; Angela Groothuizen; Chantal Janzen; Gordon Heuckeroth
- Winner: Nick Nicolai
- Runner-up: Mart Hoogkamer

Release
- Original network: RTL 4
- Original release: 8 April – 3 June 2016

Season chronology
- Next → Season 9

The eighth season of the Dutch talent show Holland's Got Talent began on 8 April 2016 and concluded on 3 June 2016.

Season 8 featured many changes from past seasons. There was a new host Johnny de Mol who took over from Robert ten Brink (whom quit after presenting 5 seasons). It marked the first time in the show that there were four judges - Gordon Heuckeroth, Chantal Janzen and Dan Karaty still remained on the panel, however the show saw Angela Groothuizen join as a judge, having previously been a judge on such shows as X Factor, The Voice of Holland and Let's Dance.

It also introduced the concept of the 'golden buzzer' inspired by other shows in the Got Talent franchise. The golden buzzer sends an act straight through to the semi-finals. Each judge can press it only once during the entire season. Heuckeroth used his on dance group 'The Rocking Chairs', Janzen used hers on singer Bob Bullee, Karaty pressed for dance group The Fresh Allstars and Groothuizen pressed the buzzer for singer Nick Nicolai, who would later go on to become the season's overall winner.

== Semifinals ==
The semi-finals premiered on 13 May 2016 to 27 May 2016; there were three semi-finals with nine acts in each. Three acts each week continued to the grand final - usually one with the public vote and the other two chosen by the judges. Semi-final 3 was different as two were sent through by the public and one by the judges' vote. Unlike past seasons, these semifinals were not broadcast live, however the final still was. There was only one buzzer pressed in the semi-finals (that being Karaty buzzing Sixxpaxx). The Rocking Chairs were the only golden buzzer act not to make the finals.

=== Semi-finalists ===
Participant	Act	Semi-Final	Result
Nick Nicolai	Singer	3	Winner
Mart Hoogkamer	Singer	2	Runner-up
Bob Bullee	Singer	1	3rd Place
The Fresh Allstars	Dance Group	1	Finalist
Team Quattrobar	Acrobats	1	Finalist
Unbreakable	Dance Group	2	Finalist
Justin (BBoy Lil Justy)	Break Dancer	2	Finalist
Mizai Kobi	Acrobat	3	Finalist
Karate Girls	Karate Act	3	Finalist
XuanXuan Wang	Pianist	1	Semi-Finalist
The Happiness Crew	Dance Group	1	Semi-Finalist
Paulance	Hand Stand Act	1	Semi-Finalist
Ray	Singer	1	Semi-Finalist
Peter and Ronald	Magicians	1	Semi-Finalist
Helena Nahafahik and Thomas Jacks	Dancers	1	Semi-Finalist
Junior Jazz Unlimited Big Band	Jazz Band	2	Semi-Finalist
Bea Lamelas	Contortionist	2	Semi-Finalist
Christian Farla	Illusionist	2	Semi-Finalist
Ritmisch Gym Wilskracht	Gymnastics	2	Semi-Finalist
Miss Kiki Boops	Drag Queen Singer	2	Semi-Finalist
Friends Crw	Dance Group	2	Semi-Finalist
The Rocking Chairs	Dance Group	3	Semi-Finalist
JP De Kam	Fire Breather Dangerous Act	3	Semi-Finalist
SixxPaxx	Strippers Dance Group	3	Semi-Finalist
Anke Prevoo	Singer And Pianist	3	Semi-Finalist
Alex (Onearmed)	One Arm Drummer	3	Semi-Finalist
Doris	Dancer	3	Semi-Finalist

=== Semi-finals summary ===
Buzzed Out | Won the Public's Vote | Won the Judges' Vote | Eliminated

=== Semi-final 1 (13 May 2016) ===
Semi-Finalist	Order	Buzzes				Result
Semi-Finalist	Order	Heuckeroth	Groothuizen	Janzen	Karaty	Result
The Fresh Allstars	1					Advanced (Won Judges' Vote)
Ray	2					Eliminated
Helena Nahafahik and Thomas Jacks	3					Eliminated
XuanXuan Wang	4					Eliminated
Team Quattrobar	5					Advanced (Won Public Vote)
The Happiness Crew	6					Eliminated
Peter & Ronald	7					Eliminated
Paulance	8					Eliminated
Bob Bullee	9					Advanced (Won Judges' Vote)

=== Semi-final 2 (20 May 2016) ===
Semi-Finalist	Order	Buzzes				Result
Semi-Finalist	Order	Heuckeroth	Groothuizen	Janzen	Karaty	Result
Christian Farla	1					Eliminated
Justin (BBoy Lil Justy)	2					Advanced (Won Judges' Vote)
Ritmisch Gymnastiek	3					Eliminated
Miss Kiki Boops	4					Eliminated
Unbreakable	5					Advanced (Won Public Vote)
Bea Lamelas	6					Eliminated
Friends Crw	7					Eliminated
Junior Jazz	8					Eliminated
Mart Hoogkamer	9					Advanced (Won Judges' Vote)

=== Semi-final 3 (27 May 2016) ===
Semi-Finalist	Order	Buzzes				Result
Semi-Finalist	Order	Heuckeroth	Groothuizen	Janzen	Karaty	Result
Sixxpaxx	1					Eliminated
OneArmed	2					Eliminated
Nick Nicolai	3					Advanced (Won Public Vote)
Mizai Kobi	4					Advanced (Won Public Vote)
Anke Prevoo	5					Eliminated
Doris	6					Eliminated
The Rocking Chairs	7					Eliminated
JP De Kam	8					Eliminated
Karate Girls	9					Advanced (Won Judges' Vote)

== Grand Final (3 June 2016) ==
Order	Artist	Act	Result
1	Justin (BBoy Lil Justy)	Break Dancer	Finalist
2	Nick Nicolai	Singer	Winner
3	Karate Girls	Karate Act	Finalist
4	The Fresh Allstars	Dance Group	Finalist
5	Mizai Kobi	Acrobat	Finalist
6	Bob Bullee	Singer	3rd Place
7	Unbreakable	Dance Group	Finalist
8	Mart Hoogkamer	Singer	Runner-up
9	Team Quattrobar	Acrobats	Finalist
