= Holland's Got Talent season 9 =

Holland's Got Talent
- Season 9
- Hosted by: Johnny de Mol
- Judges: Dan Karaty; Angela Groothuizen; Chantal Janzen; Gordon Heuckeroth
- Winner: The Fire

Release
- Original network: RTL 4
- Original release: 28 April 2017 – June 2017

Season chronology
- ← Previous; Season 8 Next → Season 10

Holland's Got Talent is the Dutch member of the Got Talent television show franchise. The ninth season of Holland's Got Talent began on 28 April 2017.

The competition was won by The Fire, a dance group.
