= Oscar Carré =

Oscar Carré (Halberstadt, December 22, 1845 - Copenhagen, June 29, 1911) was a circus director and entrepreneur. He was the son of Wilhelm Carré and Dutch equestrian Cornelia Adriana de Gast (stage name: Kätchen Carré). Oscar was responsible for the construction of the famous Circustheater Carré on the Amstel River in Amsterdam. The Oscar Carré Trophy is a Dutch circus award named him.

== Life and career ==
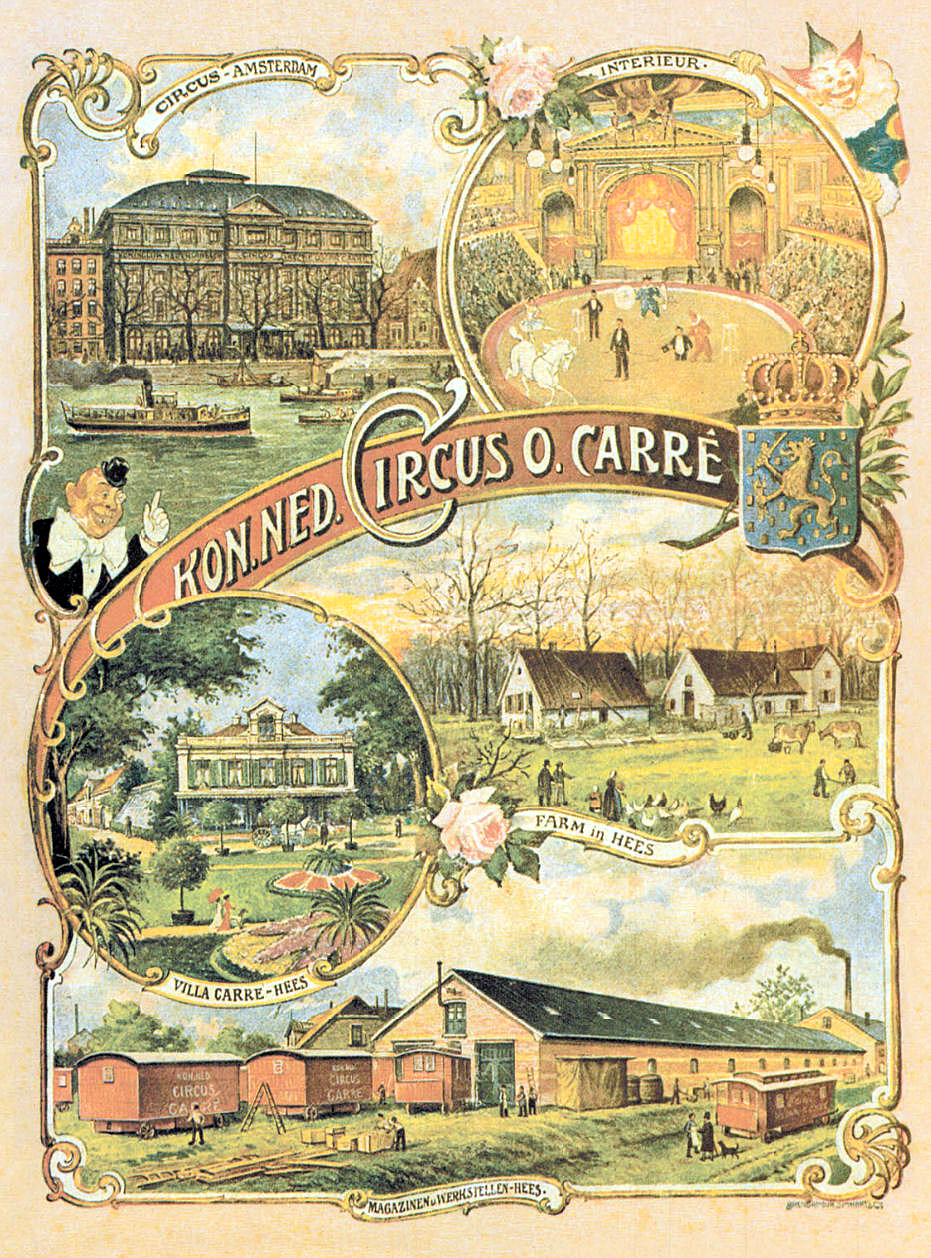
Various parts of the Royal Dutch Circus O.Carré: Villa Carré Hees, Farm in Hees, Warehouse and workmen's quarters in Hees and the Circus Amsterdam with interior built in 1887.

Carré was a member of a German circus family. In 1863, the Carré family came to the Netherlands. Oscar took over the circus business from his father in 1869. He built the circus into a great success and had several permanent circus theaters built, first in Vienna (1873) and in Cologne (1878) and finally in Amsterdam. In addition to German, English and Russian, he also spoke fluent Dutch.

=== Amsterdam ===
Carré initially used a temporeary, wooden circus building, which had to be demolished in 1880 by order of the municipality due to fire hazard. Carré decided to erect a stone circus building, but only after years of official tug-of-war did he receive the required building permit in 1886. Through bonds, he managed to raise the required construction fees of 300,000 guilders; in April 1887, pile driving began and the building was completed eight months later. On December 2, 1887, Oscar opened the Circus Carré theater in Amsterdam. Horse shows were performed in this theater during the annual fair.

Carré also continued to perform abroad, for which he transported his entire circus on his own train. The train collided head-on with another passenger train at Kirchlengern in Germany on May 22, 1891, killing his wife Amalia and injuring two of his children as well as one of his riders so severely that they were unable to perform. (Note: Due to a mistake by the local station master, who had released the single track for both trains at the same time. The man was subsequently sentenced to a year in prison by a German judge. A total of four people were killed in the accident. Many of the circus' belongings, some of them valuable, were also lost.) Only four days later, Oscar was forced to perform with his circus again.

Carré's career is described in the work De bonte droom van het Circus, which was published in 1956 in a very large print run by the Nederlands Zuivelbureau. In it it is recounted that in 1897 in Scheveningen, after the death of his second wife and in the face of bankruptcy (due, among other things, to increasing competition from the variety show), Carré could not tolerate that his cherished Trakehner stallions would end up with strangers, and that he therefore led them to the dunes and shot them. However, the veracity of this story is doubted, as described in the documentary “Circushart,” broadcast by NTR on December 24, 2012 and January 6, 2013. It is reported that Empress Elisabeth of Austria received riding lessons from him when she was in the Netherlands for treatment of her arthritic complaints at the Amstel Hotel located a stone's throw from the theater.

=== Nijmegen ===
The family stayed mostly in Amsterdam from November to April in the residence above the theater, then went on tour throughout Europe. At the turn of the century, Oscar Carré had selected the Hees estate (in Nijmegen) to rest with the entire circus after the touring summer months. In August 1901 he bought the villa Welgelegen, on the corner Voorstadslaan-Dorpsstraat (Schependomlaan) and in the immediate vicinity a farm and land for a riding school.

Next to Café Juliana on Dorpsstraat, Carré had a large riding school built for as many as a hundred horses. Old Nijmegen residents still remember the family riding out over the city's canals on beautiful Sundays with a beautifully harnessed four-horse pack. Circus Carré made relatively short use of the stables.

=== Death and legacy ===
Oscar Carré suffered increasing health problems and died in 1911 at the age of 65. The circus was experiencing hard times, due in part to the rise of cinemas. Ironically, besides being a circus director with a good sense of publicity and a phenomenal horse trainer, Oscar Carré was also a film pioneer, who has some of the oldest Dutch film footage (including the inauguration of Queen Wilhelmina in 1898) to his name. The circus eventually went bankrupt, but Oscar's work was carried on by his descendants, and his grandson and great-granddaughter still perform. The building in Nijmegen (Hees) was reused for other purposes soon after Oscar's death in 1911, including storage shed, brick factory, garage business and car parts store. In 2008, the “stables of Carré” made way for a residential complex. In addition to the Oscar Carré Trophy, an elementary school was named after him in the Amsterdam Pijp district.
