= Lou Bandy =

Dutch singer and conferencier

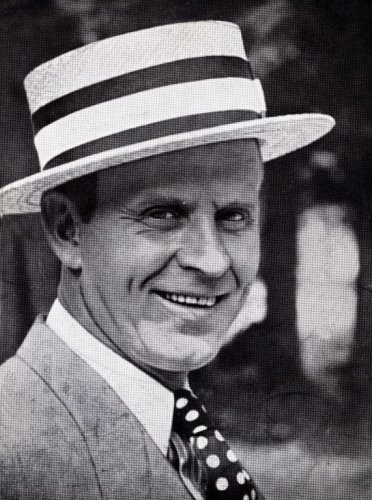
Lou Bandy in 1938

Lodewijk Ferdinand Dieben (19 April 1890, in The Hague – 24 June 1959, in Zandvoort), better known under his pseudonym Lou Bandy, was a Dutch singer and conferencier who was one of the most popular artists in the Netherlands, between both world wars. Among his most famous songs are: Zoek de zon op (Look for the sun), Schep vreugde in het leven (Put joy in life) and Louise zit niet op je nagels te bijten (Louise, don't bite your nails).

== Biography ==
Lodewijk Ferdinand Dieben was raised in a working-class family in The Hague. Dieben worked as a piccolo, house servant, street singer, and a conscriptionist with the Navy before he started a serious career in variety in 1915. At first he performed with his brother Willy Derby under the name The Bandy Brothers (Bandy being an Anglicisation of his last name Dieben with the syllables reversed.) Soon it became apparent that the characters of the brothers were too different to work together; in contrast with Willy, Lou was known as a difficult person.

Lou continued under the name Lou Bandy. In 1921 he married the pianist Eugenie Küch, a German officer's daughter who would have a great impact on his career: she taught him decent social skills, taught him the importance of speaking proper Dutch, and helped him get his first lucrative contracts. With her support, the young man from the Hague found himself within a few years working with the top artists and theater impresarios.

Bandy continued to perform following the German occupation of The Netherlands in World War II. In 1942, he was banned from performing when he mocked the limp of Reichskommissar Arthur Seyss-Inquart during a performance at Royal Theater Carré in Amsterdam.

Bandy was known by the public as a singer of happy lyrics, but to those who knew him better, he had a less upbeat image. He married the much younger Sinia Franke in 1948, and in 1952 married 19-year-old girl Carla van den Hurk. He divorced Carla in 1958 and was getting lonely.

When he was not popular anymore and he became very lonely he killed himself in his Zandvoort apartment close to the sea.
