= Circus Herman Renz =

Dutch circus company

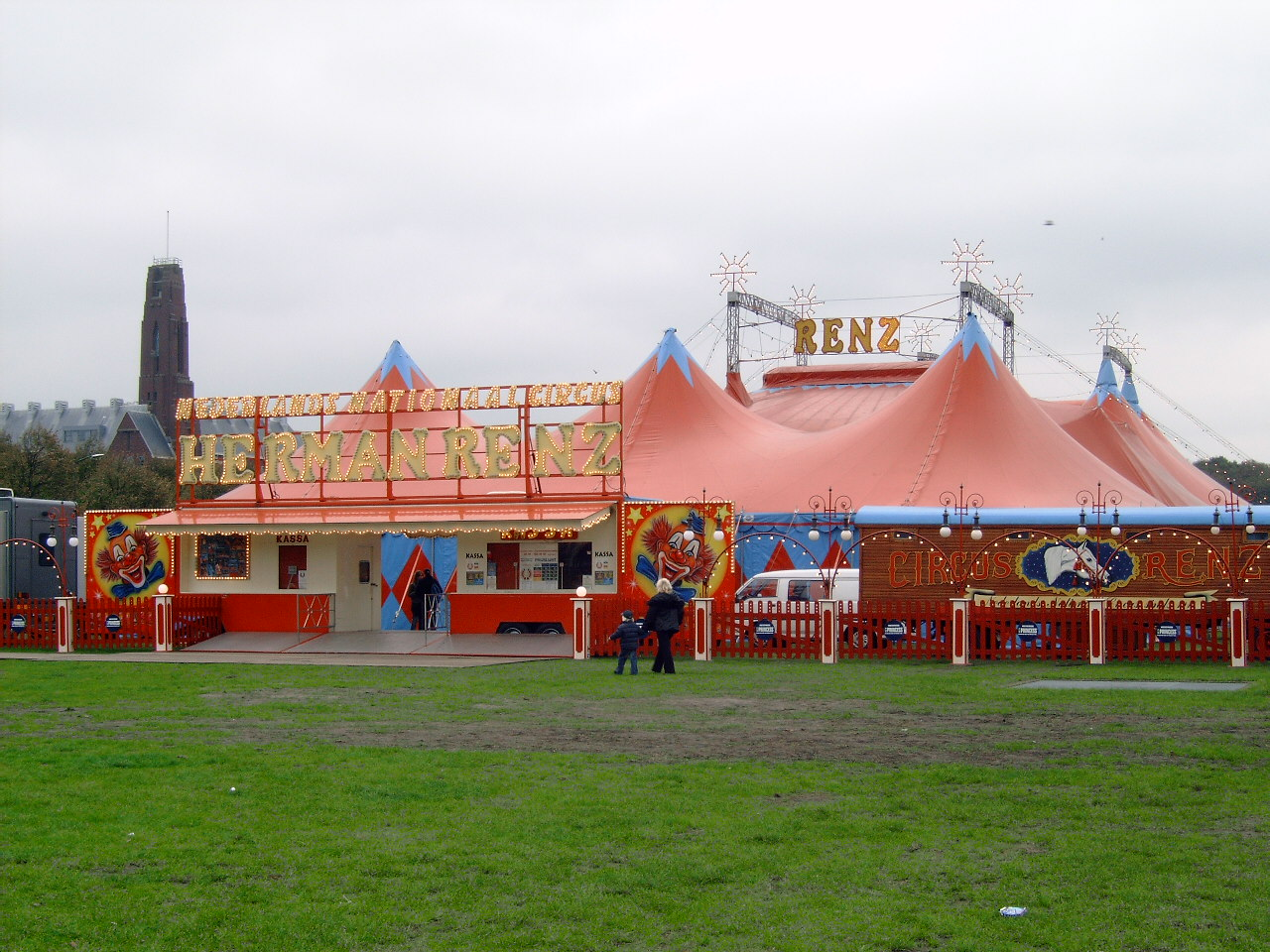
2004 - Circus Herman Renz

Circus Herman Renz is the largest circus in the Netherlands, and has been touring the Netherlands and other countries since 1911.

== History ==
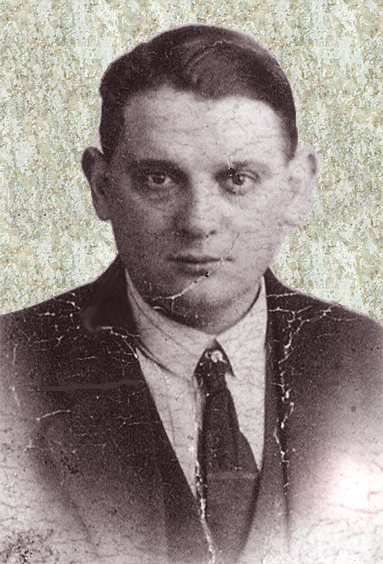
Arnold van der Vegt in 1930

Arnold van der Vegt decided in the winter of 1911 to start his own circus. The first artist he contracted was his friend Tom Mix. In 1923 Arnold changed the name of the circus to "Renz". During World War II it was difficult for the circus to survive, and because of the circumstances it was forced to give shows for Nazi Germany. After the war, the circus returned to normal shows. Arnold van der Vegt died in 1955. (Arnold van der Vegt is not related to Ernst Jakob Renz, Berlin 1842 or Renz International).

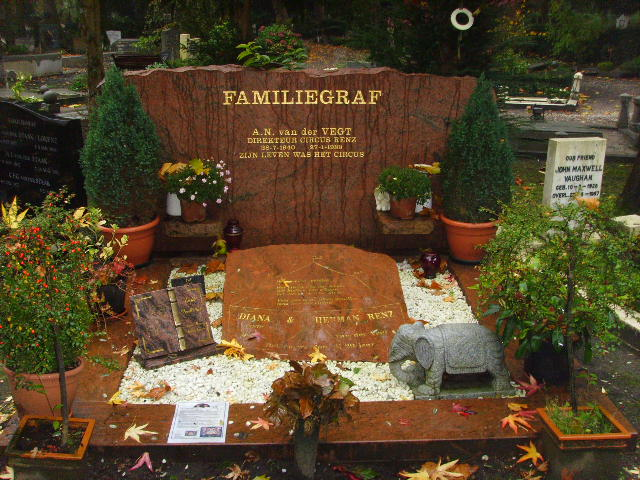
Arnold van der Vecht family memorial

After the death of Arnold van der Vegt, his son Herman Sr. took over management of the circus. In 1970 he transferred the running of the circus to his sons, Paul and Arnold Jr. (also known as Nol). Paul acted as a clown in the shows and Arnold Jr. became the director.

Arnold Jr. and his wife Marina made the circus successful. For many years they traveled around with success. In 1967 their son Herman Jr. was born. As a child, Herman's ambition was to continue his fathers circus business.

The success of circus Renz reached its peak in 1978 when Bassie and Adriaan made several television series with Circus Renz as the backdrop. At the weekends, they appeared in the circus as clowns. During this period the shows were regularly sold out.

== Bassie and Adriaan ==
In 1980 the Dutch TV producer Joop van den Ende established Circus Bassie & Adriaan. The staff of Circus Renz was involved with the entire transport of Circus Bassie & Adriaan. Circus Renz itself traveled throughout the country. At the end of 1983 Joop van den Ende ended his work with the circus, after he did a show with the Dutch singer André Hazes.

At Circus Renz, the Steijvers family started a new act, followed by the new act of the Luycx Sisters in 1983. Herman Jr. fell in love with Diana Luycx and they started a relationship.

Arnold Jr. again worked with Bassie and Adriaan in 1985. The cooperation between them was renewed and the circus Renz grew. But, in 1988, Arnold Jr. became very ill. His last wish was to travel once more with Bassie and Adriaan and a complete new circus tent. The new tent was bought, but in January 1989 Arnold van der Vegt Jr. died of cancer. Because the new tour was already planned, Bassie and Adriaan finished the tour after which, in 1989, the tent was sold.

== The new circus Renz ==
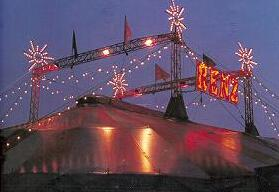
1991 - Circus Herman Renz

In 1990 Herman Jr., and his girlfriend Diana, performed for one season with the French circus Achille Zavatta II. Despite this, Herman wanted to continue the Circus Renz with Diana, and the families of Steijvers and Ronday.

In September 1990 Diana & Herman Renz ended a contract with the Circus Achille Zavatta II. On 13 March 1991 they open with the renewed 'Dutch National Circus Herman Renz'. The first show on the tour was in Eemnes. For the young board of directors it was a big venture, but thanks to a contract with Center Parcs it turned into a large success.

Over a five-year period, the now-married Diana & Herman Renz developed the circus into the largest in the Netherlands and later Benelux. The circus always wintered the show in the Dutch city of Haarlem. In December 1995 Diana & Herman Renz received the Oscar Carré Trophy. The trophy was awarded by the Swiss circus director Frédy Knie of Circus Knie.

The 1996 tour started on 22 February in the Dutch city of Hilversum. A new tent has ordered and there was a new contract with Center Parcs for the show.

== Show on hold ==
On 13 March 1996 the circus had arrived in the Dutch city of Hapert for a show at Centerparc 'Het Vennenbos'. Herman and Diana had not been seen yet that day. Worried manager Robert Ronday looked for them and found them dead, poisoned by carbon monoxide. The shows and the tour were temporarily cancelled. Some days later, the Circus moved to Haarlem, where the funeral took place. The couple were then buried at the 'Zorgvlied' cemetery in Amsterdam.

== New show ==
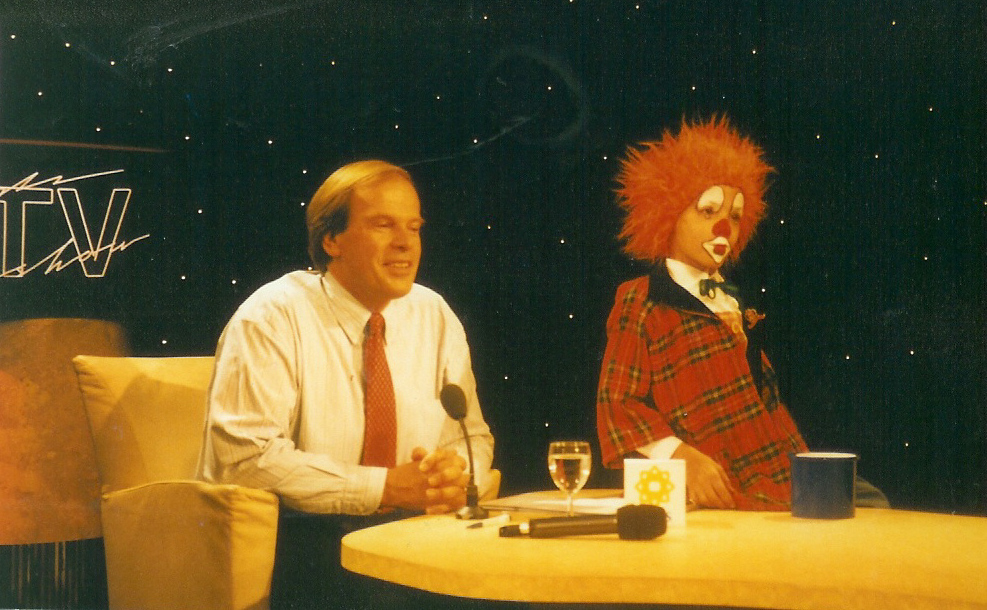
1996 - nine-year-old Ronald Blom at the 'TV-Show of Ivo Niehe'

A week after the burial Herman's mother announced that she wanted to sell the circus for 800,000 Dutch guilders. Many people wanted to save the circus. Nine-year-old Ronald Blom generated a lot of publicity, appearing on television shows such as the 'TV-Show of Ivo Niehe', 'Hart van Nederland' and 'Het Jeugdjournaal' (the news for youth). There was even a story in the local newspaper of Haarlem ('Haarlems Dagblad'). Ronald also collected money (in total 1,012 guilders). Ed Glas also organized actions to save the circus, and together with the interim executive board of the circus, Toin Routers (public relations officer of the circus in 2005) and Hans de Jager, a fan club was set up. Individuals and companies could rent a chair in the Circus as sponsors. Princess Household Appliances, a company located in Breda owned by Aad Ouborg, sponsored the circus until 1998.

Today the circus is owned by the families Steijvers, Ronday and Olivier. The executive board consists of five people.

Circus Herman Renz went bankrupt in October 2015, after the Duursma Group took it over. The Duursma Group restarted Circus Herman Renz with a new series of performances at the Maashorst Fair in Schaijk.

== Awards ==
On 22 December 2002 circus Herman Renz received royal recognition. Mayor Jaap Pop of Haarlem had the honour of presenting the award. Circus Herman Renz was the first Dutch circus to receive this award, which motivated the employees of Circus Herman Renz to preserve the last great Dutch circus.

During December and January, Circus Herman Renz presented its famous 'Wintershow'. During this period, visitors voted for their favorite artists. The winner received the 'Haarlemse Publieksprijs' (The Harlem Audience Award).
