= Hallo Vriendjes =

Hallo Vriendjes En Vriendinnetjes or Hello, Boys And Girls, is the theme song of the worldwide known Dutch clown and acrobat duo Bassie & Adriaan performances and their long running television series.

The 1997 version of the song was a hit on the internet starting September 2014 and for that reason released as single. People from all over the world place themselves in front of a webcam and videotape their singing the theme song with or without the accompanying music.

== Forming ==
A demo version of this song was first heard during radio plays in 1984. From 1985 on every television season and shorty would carry a revised version titled "Hallo Vriendjes" as opening song and a version with altered text (Dag Vriendjes / Bye, Boys) would be heard during the ending credits. The short and mostly used version (23 seconds) would also open and end every performance in theaters and related events, always with the opening version as opening song and always with the ending version as ending song. The standard version is always the short version.

== Different versions ==
=== 1985: 'Het Geheim Van De Schatkaart' ===
For "Het Geheim Van De Schatkaart" (The Secret Of The Treasure Map) the music is the same as with "De Verdwenen Kroon" and company but the text is slightly different. Arrangements by Aad Klaris.

=== 1985: Standard version ===
From now on every performance and related event would open and end with this melancholic version, as well as the shorties produced for Belgian television and the tenth season "Liedjes Uit Grootmoeders Tijd" (Songs From Times Gone, 1995). Arrangements by Aad Klaris.

Also present on most CDs, cassettes and LPs released between 1985 and 1996.

=== 1988: 'De Verdwenen Kroon', 'De Geheimzinnige Opdracht' (1992) and 'De Reis Vol Verrassingen' (1994) ===
The standard long version for the television seasons played on instruments including a flute. Arrangements by Aad Klaris.

=== 1989: 'De Verzonken Stad' ("Greek version") ===
For the series "De Verzonken Stad" (The Sunken City) and one accompanieng CD ("Radiostation No. 2 Vanuit Griekenland" / "Radio Station No.2 From Greece", 1989-print) a Greek styled version was produced. Arrangements by Aad Klaris.

=== 1994: Caribbean version ===
For the CD and Cassette release of the series' soundtrack "De Reis Vol Verrassingen" (The Journey Full Of Surprises) a remix in Caribbean style was produced as opening song. Arrangements by Aad Klaris.

=== 1997: New standard version ===
Every performance from now on would open and end with a remix played on the flute. Arrangements by Bert Smorenburg.

In the series' remastering of 2010/2011 the short (standard) version would also be used for the television seasons.

Also present on all CDs and cassettes released since 1998.

=== 2003: Series remastering ===
For the remastering of the complete series in 2003 one new version was made for (almost) all television seasons, played on instruments including the flute. Arrangements by Bert Smorenburg.

All versions used in the television series were replaced by the new version. Where the short version was used, the new short version would be the replacement.
