= Oscar Carré Trophy =

The Oscar Carré Trophy (Dutch: Oscar Carré Trofee) is a circus award in Netherlands and is named after the Royal Netherland Cirque circus operator Oscar Carré. Most of the time it is based upon the complete oeuvre of the circus.

== Winners of the Oscar Carré Trophy ==
- 1993: Flavio Togni
- 1995: Herman Renz
- 2000: Louis Knie Senior of Circus Knie
- 2004: Martin Hanson

Other winners:

- Gert Siemonet Barum
- Luciën & Arlette Gruss
