= Amira Willighagen =

Dutch soprano (born 2004)

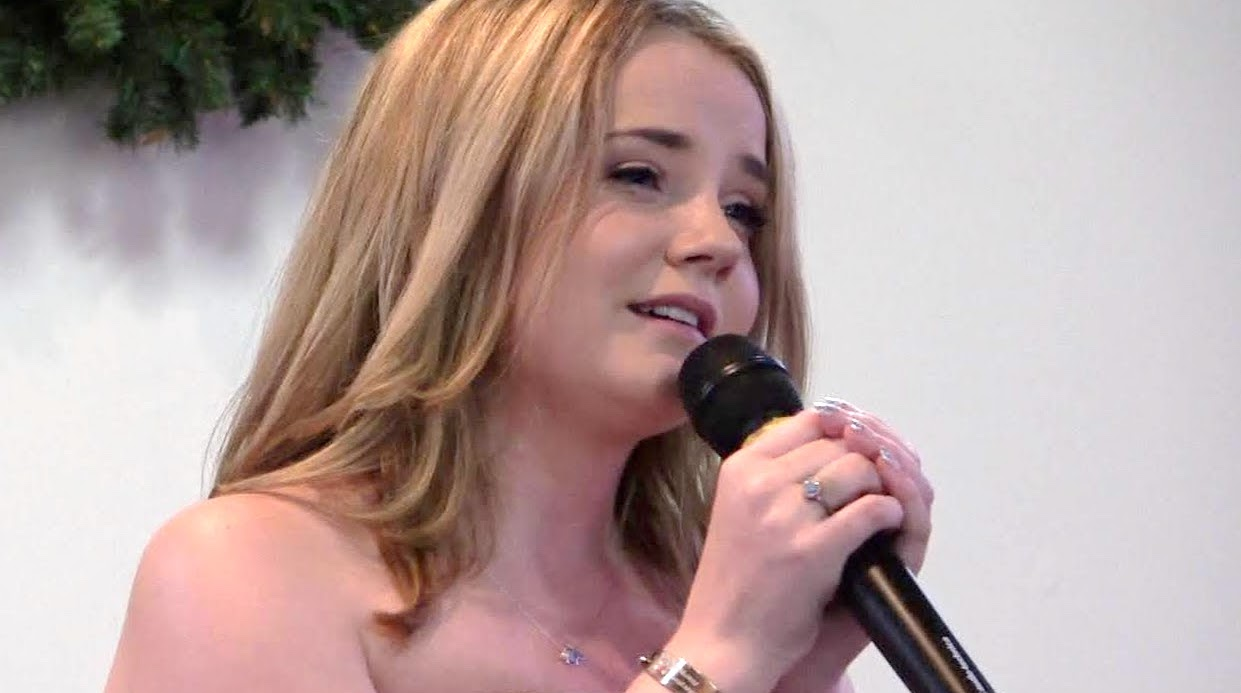
- Willighagen in 2023

Background information
- Born: 27 March 2004 (age 22); Nijmegen, Netherlands
- Genres: Classical crossover
- Occupation: Singer
- Years active: 2013–present
- Website: Amira Willighagen on Facebook www.gelukskinders.org/en/

Amira Willighagen (born 27 March 2004) is a Dutch soprano who won the sixth season of Holland's Got Talent in 2013, at the age of nine. She moved to South Africa in 2018.

== Early life ==
Amira Willighagen was born in Nijmegen to a Dutch father and a South African mother whose mother tongue is Afrikaans. She grew up surrounded by classical music. At the age of seven, during a holiday in the United Kingdom, she heard the aria "Nessun dorma", performed by Luciano Pavarotti. In that period she looked at her brother Fincent playing the violin, their mother Frieda also played the violin and the father Gerrit played the piano. She did not know how to play instruments, so she tried to sing vocally. At the beginning, before taking singing lessons, Willighagen taught herself to sing opera arias, using YouTube tutorials. That's how she discovered her talent and passion for music. Even her mother was surprised when she heard her the first time singing.

Two of her first public appearances took place in 2012, at the "Music makes Friends" festival in Colmschate (accompanied by her family) and as a solo singer in the Emmaus Children's Choir, singing a Dutch version of the song "Nella Fantasia". After two years of practice and performance improvement, she was ready to participate in the show Holland's Got Talent. Indeed, she won the admiration of the jury, the public and millions of people from all over the world who saw her on television and on the Internet.

== Career ==
=== Holland's Got Talent ===
Willighagen auditioned for Holland's Got Talent and so impressed the judging panel with her version of "O Mio Babbino Caro" from Puccini's opera Gianni Schicchi that within seconds the judges were staring in awe and disbelief. Her performance rapidly became a YouTube hit, with over 150 million combined views, as of January 2024. In the semi-finals, she performed Gounod's "Ave Maria". "You're a star who belongs on stage!", said Dan Karaty, one of the judges, after her performance in the semi-finals. In the final she sang "Nessun dorma", from Puccini's opera Turandot. She won the competition with over 50% of the votes of the TV-viewers and audience.

=== 2014–present ===
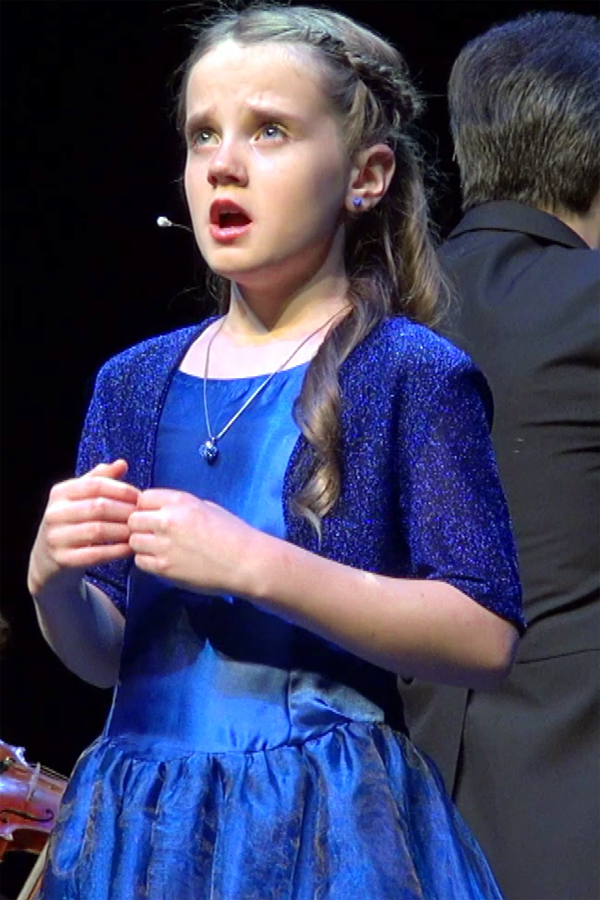
Amira in Lelystad, Netherlands, 19 November 2014 (age 10)

After the success from Holland's Got Talent, during 2014 Willighagen was invited to various TV shows: at South African Internet station Channel24, on 21 March 2014 at Omroep Gelderland (Netherlands), on 11 May 2014 at Life4You – Carlo & Irene on RTL 4 (Netherlands), on 7 June 2014 at Willkommen bei Carmen Nebel (Welcome to Carmen Nebel) on ZDF (Germany), at RTL (German TV channel), performing "I Have a Dream", on 20 August 2014 at Susana Giménez on Telefe (Argentina) and on 21 December 2014 at Du côté de chez Dave on France 3.

In February 2014, Willighagen recorded her debut album, Amira, accompanied by the City of Prague Philharmonic Orchestra. The album contains 10 tracks, including the songs she performed during Holland's Got Talent. Other tracks from this album are "Nella Fantasia", "Song To The Moon", and "Pie Jesu" from Requiem (Lloyd Webber). The album was released in the Netherlands on 28 March 2014, reaching a Gold status only two weeks later. André Rieu invited Willighagen to follow a masterclass in London, after a member of his orchestra saw her in the Holland's Got Talent audition on YouTube. Then, on 11 and 12 July 2014, she appeared with André Rieu and his Johann Strauss Orchestra in Maastricht, during the recording of the album Love in Venice.

Amira's first international performances took place at the Starlight Classics Concerts in Somerset West, South Africa on 28 February and 1 March 2014. On 30 April 2014 she performed in Las Vegas as part of the prize she received when winning Holland's Got Talent. Amira's performances include appearances in the Netherlands, South Africa, Belgium, USA, Germany, Switzerland, United Kingdom, Italy, Spain, France, Poland, Hong Kong, Argentina, Mexico, Malta, Monaco, Iceland, Austria, and Botswana.

On 8 November 2014 Willighagen visited the Pontifical Urbaniana University in Rome to receive the International Giuseppe Sciacca Award 2014. In November 2015, Willighagen released her second album, Merry Christmas. Besides a selection of well-known Christmas carols ("O Holy Night", "Silent Night", "Hark! The Herald Angels Sing"), the album contains various famous arias and hymns ("Panis angelicus", "Ave Maria (Vavilov)"). The albums Amira and Merry Christmas were produced by the record label Sony Masterworks. She held also Christmas concerts on 15 December 2014 at the Royal Albert Hall London, on 19 December 2015 in the Petrus Canisius Church in Nijmegen, The Netherlands (where she sang "See, amid the Winter's Snow", "Panis angelicus", "Sancta Maria" and "Ave Maria" by Gomez), on 21 December 2015, in the St. Jacobs Church, The Hague, on 16 December 2017, in the St. Steven's Church in Nijmegen (where she performed "Dormi, Fili", "Onse Vader", "Jerusalem", "Panis Angelicus", "See, amid the Winter's Snow", "Stille Nacht / Silent Night", and "How Great Thou Art"), on 15 December 2019, in Nijmegen ("Joy to the World" was one of the songs in the program), on 16 December 2019 in Dreumel. On 9 December 2019 Amira performed in the Sint-Jacobskerk, The Hague, which was recorded and later broadcast on 25 December 2019 on Omroep MAX public broadcasting television.

In 2015, Willighagen participated, on 4 April, at the Sanremo Junior Festival in Malta, in September in the show "Superkids – die größten kleinen Talente der Welt" ("Superkids – the biggest little talents in the world"), broadcast by the German TV station Sat.1, where she performed "Ave Maria (Vavilov)" and in December in Madrid. In 2016, she sang at the Vacation Festival (Festival della Vacanza) in Lecce, Italy (on 28 May), at the Conservatory of the North West University, Potchefstroom (on 23 November) and also she performed "Nella Fantasia" in the Afrikaans Is Groot concert (in November). In 2017 she sang, on 20 May, at the Aqua Musica concert in Steenbergen, The Netherlands and on 2 December, in the Max Proms concert held in Utrecht, performing a short version of "O Mio Babbino Caro" and "Your Love" (the theme of the movie "Once Upon a Time in the West"). On 2 and 3 March 2018 she sang again at the RMB Starlight Classics concert.

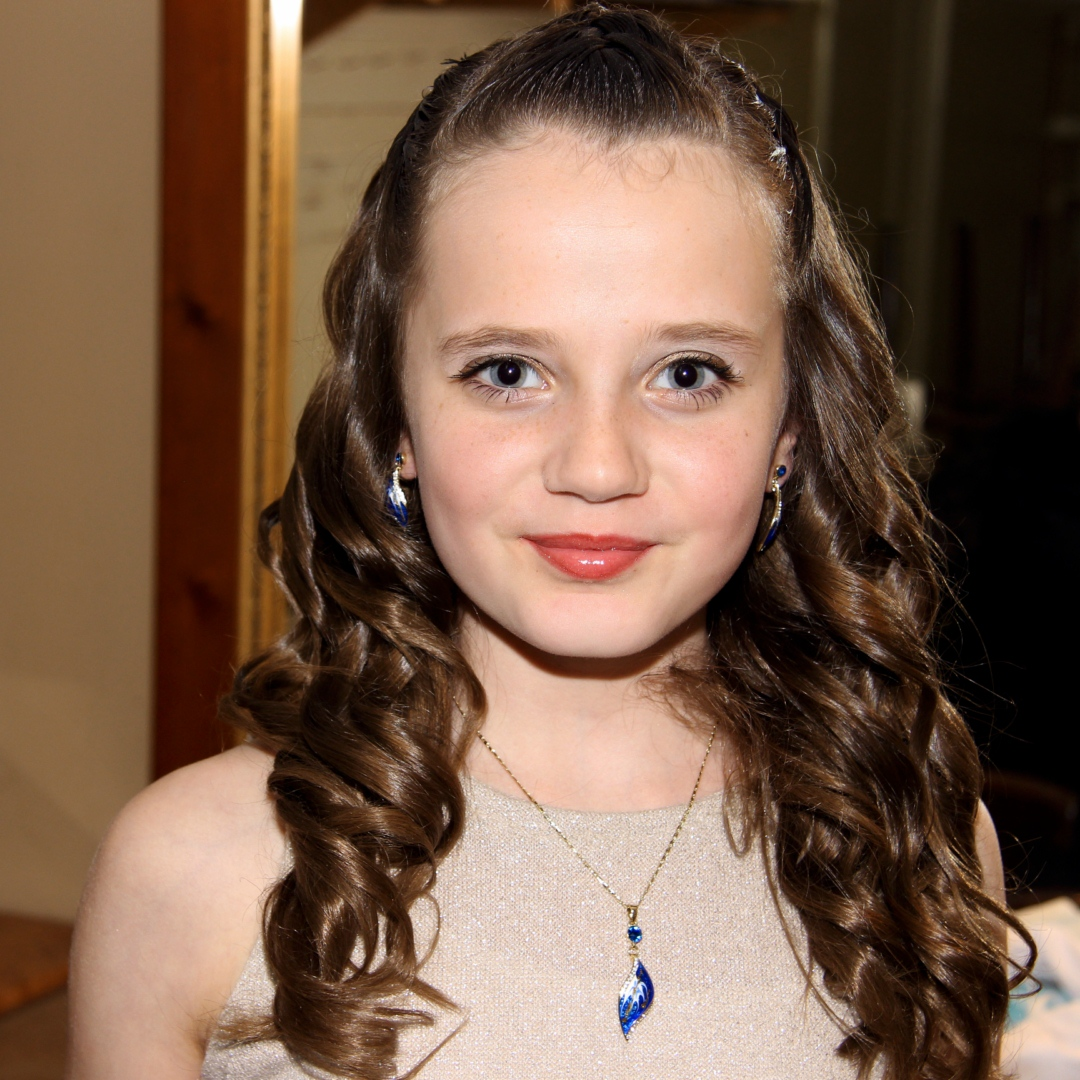
Willighagen, Lecce, Italy, May 2016 (age 12)

At the end of July 2016, Willighagen performed at the Classics Is Groot concert held in Pretoria, South Africa, where she sang "O Mio Babbino Caro", "O sole mio" (in duet with Patrizio Buanne), "Nella Fantasia" ("In My Fantasy"), composed by Ennio Morricone (originally released by Sarah Brightman in 1998) and the well-known song "My Way" (together with the other artists). At Classics Is Groot 2017 she performed "Nessun dorma", "Flower Duet" (with Corlea Botha), "Amazing Grace" and "My Way" (in group). At Classics Is Groot 2018 Willighagen sang "Gabriellas sång" – with lyrics in Swedish (from the soundtrack of the movie As It Is in Heaven), "Hallelujah" (from the album With All My Heart), "Amigos Para Siempre" (in duet with Patrizio Buanne) and "Keeping the Dream Alive" (together with the other singers). In July 2019, at Classics Is Groot, she performed a medley from the musical The Sound of Music: "Prelude / The Sound of Music", "Edelweiss" and "Climb Ev'ry Mountain".

On 2 March 2018 Willighagen's long-anticipated album With All My Heart was released in South Africa, later as audio files worldwide, under the Coleske Artists label. The album marks a change in her singing career from opera to classical crossover. Several tracks were written especially for her (for instance "Drift Away", "In The Stars) "With All My Heart" is recorded by Romanz in 2012. I Will Be With You is a translation of the African version "Jy Vat My Hoër" and "Follow Your Heart" is also translated. Amira also sings duets with Corlea Botha ("Flower Duet"), Patrizio Buanne ("’O sole mio" and "Amigos Para Siempre") and Ruhan du Toit ("Follow Your Heart").

Willighagen collaborated also with other artists: Ben Heijnen (Huizen, Netherlands on 9 December 2016), Gissur Páll Gissurarson (Reykjavík, Iceland, December 2015), Paul Potts and James Bhemgee (Durban, South Africa on 9 August 2014), Fabio Armiliato (Naples, Italy on 9 November 2019).

On 1 January 2018, Amira, her brother, Fincent and mother, Frieda moved to South Africa. During an interview in a Dutch regional newspaper, they stated the Dutch school system didn't offer Willighagen sufficient flexibility for performances. Willighagen's new, South African manager planned to include fewer, longer tours. In an earlier interview, Amira's mother revealed that she and the children's father had parted. "It's for me really nice to be back again here in Nijmegen, where I was born. Yes, old friends from middle school. That's nice, because I miss them of course a little bit when I'm in South Africa.", stated Willighagen in December 2019 in an interview for the TV station Omroep Gelderland, that broadcast also the Christmas concerts from Nijmegen (2017) and Dreumel (2019).

Willighagen's YouTube channel features music videos and concert recordings: "Ave Maria (Vavilov)", from the album Merry Christmas, "In The Stars", from the album With All My Heart, "Cinema Paradiso (Se)", a song from the movie with the same title, in memory of the composer Ennio Morricone, "Amen", "La Califfa", "How Does a Moment Last Forever", "Nearer, My God, to Thee", "When You Wish Upon a Star", "Caruso" and other. Willighagen's most viewed video recording on YouTube is that from André Rieu's concert in Maastricht (July 2014). She also has performances featured on five DVDs and five CDs: Afrikaans Is Groot 2016, Classics Is Groot 2016, Classics Is Groot 2017, Classics Is Groot 2018 and Classics Is Groot 2019, all published by Coleske Artists. The song "Barcelona", performed by Willighagen in duet with Ruhan du Toit, is included on Touch Of Class's album, More Magic.

Among the concerts in 2019 can be mentioned: on 21 March in Sun Arena, Pretoria (with Helmut Lotti), on 16 April at Durbanville High School (with the Tygerberg Children's Choir), on 19 and 20 July at Classics Is Groot, Sun Arena, Pretoria, on 10 August in Kasane, Botswana, near a huge baobab (with Andre Swartz and Jannie Moolman), on 14 September at Louis Trichard Emmanuel Christian School, Zoutpansberg, on 8 October in Bloemfontein (with Jannie Moolman), on 23 October at Nelson Mandela University Auditorium, Port Elizabeth (with Corlea Botha), on 1 December in Turnhout, Belgium (with Marjolein Acke, Anne Keizer and the Cantabile choir, to mark Gelukskinders Foundation's 5th anniversary).

According to her Facebook-account, on 9 November 2019 Amira was awarded "International Mediterranean best female opera star 2019". Accordingly, the award was handed out to Amira during an International Organization for Diplomatic Relations (IODR) gala in the city of Naples where, as is further stated, she also performed a few songs. The Mediterranean Awards are an annual ceremony arranged by the Fondazione Mediterraneo, an Italian organization founded by Naples-based photographer, gallery-owner and architect Michele Capasso, promoting dialogue and peace between nations on various levels.

In mid-July 2020 was released a set of 4 DVDs – Five Years Gelukskinders – including the anniversary concerts in Turnhout (December 2019), images from backstage and rehearsals, and a documentary about the Gelukskinders Foundation (playgrounds openings and the concert given at the Tshupane school, with Siki Jo-An and school choirs). In August 2020 Willighagen held a streaming concert, This is my Dream. In this concert she sang ten songs never recorded or performed by her before, including "Senza Catene" (the Italian version of "Unchained Melody"), "Nelle Tue Mani" ("Now We Are Free", from the movie "Gladiator") and others. She was accompanied on piano by Charl Du Plessis. On 9 October 2020 a live CD – Classics Live – was released, which includes songs performed in the anniversary concerts in Turnhout (Warande and Wending), held in December 2019. The 2020 Christmas concert, entitled African Christmas with Amira and Friends, was available on Optog. In this concert also performed the tenor Lukhanyo Moyake, Mzansi Youth Choir and Charl Du Plessis, on a Steinway piano.

The streaming shows of 2020 were released on 1 August 2021, on DVD and memory stick (HD version). On 11 September 2021 she performed in a virtual concert, which was broadcast on Youtube. This concert also featured other classical/crossover singers. In December 2021 was released a double CD in limited edition, containing the streaming concerts recorded in 2020.

On 20 March 2022 Willighagen held a concert entitled On My Own, with the Phoenix Orchestra, conducted by Richard Cock. This concert includes the songs "Wishing You Were Somehow Here Again" (from the musical "The Phantom of the Opera"), "La Califfa", "My Favorite Things" (from "The Sound of Music"), "Nearer, My God, to Thee". On 14 May 2022 was the online show Diversity is Phenomenal. Amira recorded a music video for the show, the song "How Does a Moment Last Forever", from the movie "Beauty And The Beast". On My Own – Amira's 18th birthday celebration concert – was released in October 2022 on CD. It is Willighagen's second live album, after Classics Live (2020). On 18 December 2022, Amira Willighagen and Anne Keizer (on piano) performed in a concert in Bergeijk, Netherlands.

On 22 July 2023, Willighagen performed at Pop Classics, in Pretoria. She published exclusive content (photos and videos) on her Patreon account. In mid-September 2023 was released on CD the Christmas concert held in December 2022, in Bergeijk. In November 2023, the Christmas concert held in 2022 and the concert On My Own were released on DVD and audio USB stick. A tour in the USA took place in December 2023, including concerts in Jacksonville, Florida, Madison, Georgia, [ Los Angeles and San Diego, California] Christmas concert. . On 4 and 5 October 2023, Amira Willighagen and Charl Du Plessis performed in a concert entitled "Mimi sing Mimi" – a tribute to the South African opera singer Mimi Coertse. This concert was released on CD in mid-June 2024.

A concert entitled "Cadeautjes" ("Gifts") was available online for 24 hours, on 6-7 December 2024. The concert "Two Worlds, One Amira", celebrating Willighagen's 21st birthday and Gelukskinders Foundation 10th anniversary, took place on 5 April 2025 at Fairtree Atterbury Theatre from Pretoria. The recording of this concert was released, in December 2025, on USB stick, in two versions: video and audio.

== Philanthropy ==
According to statements on her website, with half of the revenue she makes by performing and her album sales, Willighagen supports her own charity project, Stichting Gelukskinders (Lucky Children Foundation), to build playgrounds for poor children of South African townships. Also, an important part of the foundation's funds comes from donations. The idea of creating playgrounds came up when she went to South Africa, to visit her grandmother, at the age of seven. She went outside to play, like any child, but the children from there didn't have a proper playground, so they just ran and threw stones. Astonished and disappointed, she said to her mother: "If I ever get any money I'd like to come back here and help these children have something to play." That's exactly what she did: after only three years, on 5 March 2014, she opened the first playground in Ikageng, a township near Potchefstroom, South Africa. To formalize development and maintenance of playgrounds, Willighagen's Gelukskinders Foundation was established on 1 November 2014.

On behalf of her foundation, Willighagen opened the second playground in Ikageng on 1 August 2016. Amira opened the third playground, Amira Park – Sarafina, which was completed on 20 January 2017. Amira opened her fourth playground in South Africa on 20 June 2017. Amira Park #4 was opened in Promosa. On 11 June 2018 Amira opened her 5th playground at Lesego Primary School which included carousel, swings, slide, and a sandbox. In July and August 2019 were opened six new playgrounds at schools near Potchefstroom, their number reaching 13. Other charitable actions worth mentioning are her participation in fundraising, for the victims of the Haiyan typhoon in Philippines (on 18 November 2013), for UNICEF (on 16 July 2014) and to support the victims of the devastating bush fires around Knysna, in extra concert at Classics Is Groot (on 24 June 2017). In August 2020 Willighagen donated 80000 rands (about 5200 US dollars) to the Solidarity Helping Hand. Thus, a lot of children have got gifts, in the form of food and juices.

== Discography ==
=== Albums ===
Title	Year	Peak chart positions		Notes
Title	Year	NL	BEL	Notes
Amira	2014	1	117	Studio album
Merry Christmas	2015	16	200	Studio album
With All My Heart	2018	–	–	Studio album
5 Jaar Gelukskinders	2020	–	–	4 DVD set
Classics Live	2020	–	–	Live album
Streaming Shows of 2020	2021	–	–	2 DVD set / USB stick / 2 CD – limited edition
On My Own	2022	–	–	Live album
Christmas Concert	2023	–	–	Live album
On My Own / Christmas Concert	2023	–	–	2 DVD set / audio USB stick
Mimi sing Mimi	2024	–	–	Live album
Two Worlds, One Amira	2025	–	–	USB stick
