= List of Bassie & Adriaan episodes =

This article contains a list of the Dutch TV series Bassie & Adriaan. The series ran from 1978 to 1996 and had a total of 144 episodes, as well as a series of educational shorties. These shorties consisted out of 36 episodes with a length of 5 minutes each.

== Episodes ==
=== Season 8: Bassie & Adriaan en de geheime opdracht (1992) ===
No.	Title	Directed by	Written by	Original release date
1	"A strange assignment" (Dutch: Een vreemde opdracht)	Aad van Toor	Aad van Toor	1992
2	"The difference between high and low" (Dutch: Het verschil tussen hoog en laag)	Aad van Toor	Aad van Toor	1992
3	"The end of the right track" (Dutch: Het einde van het goede spoor)	Aad van Toor	Aad van Toor	1992
4	"The way of the winegrape" (Dutch: De weg van de wijndruif)	Aad van Toor	Aad van Toor	1992
5	"Sun and rain show the way" (Dutch: Zon en regen wijzen de weg)	Aad van Toor	Aad van Toor	1992
6	"When you're handy" (Dutch: Als je bij de hand bent)	Aad van Toor	Aad van Toor	1992
7	"Where singing is dangerous" (Dutch: Waar zingen gevaarlijk is)	Aad van Toor	Aad van Toor	1992
8	"On 42.295 meters" (Dutch: Op 42.195 meter)	Aad van Toor	Aad van Toor	1992
9	"From the hand of a kids friend" (Dutch: Uit de hand van een kindervriend)	Aad van Toor	Aad van Toor	1992
10	"The most smallest is really big" (Dutch: Het allerkleinste is heel groot)	Aad van Toor	Aad van Toor	1992
11	"Underwater in a dry place" (Dutch: Onder water op een droge plek)	Aad van Toor	Aad van Toor	1992
12	"The mysterious constituent" (Dutch: De geheimzinnige opdrachtgever)	Aad van Toor	Aad van Toor	1992

=== Season 9: Bassie & Adriaan en de reis vol verassingen (1994) ===
No.	Title	Directed by	Written by	Original release date
1	"The 3rd of 26" (Dutch: De 3de van 26)	Aad van Toor	Aad van Toor	1994
2	"A miraculous discovery" (Dutch: Een wonderlijke ontdekking)	Aad van Toor	Aad van Toor	1994
3	"More luck than wisdom" (Dutch: Meer geluk dan wijsheid)	Aad van Toor	Aad van Toor	1994
4	"Bassie for president" (Dutch: Bassie als president)	Aad van Toor	Aad van Toor	1994
5	"The prison island" (Dutch: Het gevangeniseiland)	Aad van Toor	Aad van Toor	1994
6	"A gigantic forest" (Dutch: Een gigantisch bos)	Aad van Toor	Aad van Toor	1994
7	"The mirage" (Dutch: De luchtspiegeling)	Aad van Toor	Aad van Toor	1994
8	"An unexpected bath" (Dutch: Een onverwacht bad)	Aad van Toor	Aad van Toor	1994
9	"The stick-up" (Dutch: De overval)	Aad van Toor	Aad van Toor	1994
10	"The Walk of Fame" (Dutch: Het pad der beroemdheden)	Aad van Toor	Aad van Toor	1994
11	"Bassie as rainmaker" (Dutch: Bassie als regenmaker)	Aad van Toor	Aad van Toor	1994
12	"A big surprise" (Dutch: Een grote verrassing)	Aad van Toor	Aad van Toor	1994
13	"The kids paradise" (Dutch: Het kinderparadijs)	Aad van Toor	Aad van Toor	1994
14	"A bang of a wild west show" (Dutch: Een knal goeie wild west show)	Aad van Toor	Aad van Toor	1994
15	"A suspicious mini-plane" (Dutch: Een verdacht vliegtuigje)	Aad van Toor	Aad van Toor	1994
16	"A border case" (Dutch: Een grensgeval)	Aad van Toor	Aad van Toor	1994

=== Season 10: Bassie & Adriaan met liedjes uit grootmoeders tijd (1995) ===
No.	Title	Directed by	Written by	Original release date
1	"Riding in a wagon" (Dutch: Rijden in een wagentje)	Aad van Toor	Aad van Toor	1995
2	"Who's coming along?" (Dutch: Wie gaat er mee?)	Aad van Toor	Aad van Toor	1995
3	"Ozewiezewo" (Dutch: Ozewiezewo)	Aad van Toor	Aad van Toor	1996

=== Specials ===
==== Shorties (1984, 1986, 1990) ====
No.	Title	Directed by	Written by	Original release date
1	"The alphabet" (Dutch: Het alfabet)	Aad van Toor	Aad van Toor	1990
2	"Movie production" (Dutch: Filmopname)	Aad van Toor	Aad van Toor	1990
3	"Ghosts don't exist" (Dutch: Spoken bestaan niet)	Aad van Toor	Aad van Toor	1990
4	"Four seasons in a year" (Dutch: Vier seizoenen in een jaar)	Aad van Toor	Aad van Toor	1990
5	"A mistake is only human" (Dutch: Een vergissing is menselijk)	Aad van Toor	Aad van Toor	1990
6	"Adriaan all colored up" (Dutch: Adriaan staat er gekleurd op)	Aad van Toor	Aad van Toor	1990
7	"Forgetfull" (Dutch: Vergeetachtig)	Aad van Toor	Aad van Toor	1990
8	"At the post" (Dutch: Bij de post)	Aad van Toor	Aad van Toor	1990
9	"Bassie the math magic" (Dutch: Bassie het rekenwonder)	Aad van Toor	Aad van Toor	1990
10	"The feeling" (Dutch: Het voorgevoel)	Aad van Toor	Aad van Toor	1990

==== TV movies (1987/1992/1994) ====
No.	Title	Directed by	Written by	Original release date
1	"100 X Bassie & Adriaan" (Dutch: 100 X Bassie & Adriaan)	Aad van Toor	Aad van Toor	1987
2	"Letters to the Queen" (Dutch: Brieven aan de Koningin)	Aad van Toor	Aad van Toor	1992
3	"The disappeared TROS star" (Dutch: De verdwenen TROSster)	Aad van Toor	Aad van Toor	1994
