= Circus Bassie & Adriaan =

Dutch circus

Circus Bassie & Adriaan

Circus Bassie & Adriaan was a large Dutch circus that had made different tours through the Netherlands and Belgium. It has been touring in the periods 1980–1982 and 1985–1989.

The directors of the circus were Bassie & Adriaan (Bas van Toor and Aad van Toor), a Dutch artist duo between 1976 and 2003. Bassie is a clown and Adriaan acrobat. Together they made nine large television series for children. Also one of the directors was TV-producer Joop van den Ende. The staff of Circus Herman Renz was involved with the entire transport of Circus Bassie & Adriaan at its start.
