= Bassie & Adriaan =

Dutch circus duo

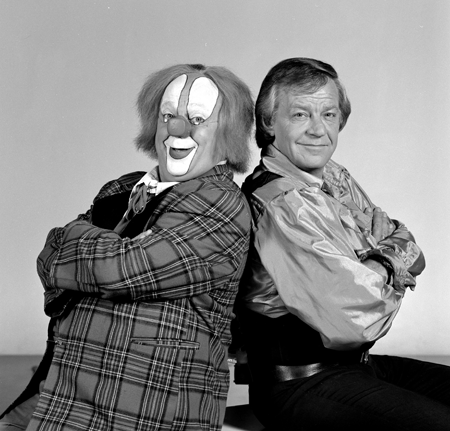
- Created by: Aad van Toor; Bas van Toor; Joop van den Ende
- Starring: Aad van Toor; Bas van Toor; Paul van Gorcum and others
- Country of origin: Netherlands
- No. of episodes: 144

Production
- Running time: 25 minutes (without commercials)

Original release
- Network: Nederland 2 (TROS) (1978-1990); TV 2 (TROS) (1992-1996)
- Release: 1978 – 1996

Bassie & Adriaan is a television program series focusing on the adventures and lives of a circus duo consisting of clown Bassie and acrobat Adriaan, played by real-life circus duo Bas and Aad van Toor.

Written by Aad van Toor and originally produced by Joop van den Ende, the first series became a television hit in the Netherlands in the spring season of 1978. At its peak, the show attracted over three million viewers, which was noted to be "a lot" for a children's program. The show ran for nine series, with the last original episode airing in 1996. Between 1980 and 1982, the Van Toor brothers ran their own independent circus, named Circus Bassie & Adriaan, which later became a subsidiary of Circus Renz.

== Background ==
Bas van Toor (born 1935) left school at an early age to pursue a number of odd-jobs. At age 19 he joined the circus and spent a year on the road. After this, he decided to form an acrobat duo with his brother Aad (born 1942). In 1955, The Melton Brothers/The Crocksons were born.

The seeds for Bassie & Adriaan were sown in 1964 when the brothers did a clown act as part of Rudi Carrell's travelling circus. The brothers wrote a clown act for Pipo de Clown, and incorporated themselves into it as well.

In 1965, they embarked on what was planned to be a two-year stint abroad; they stayed abroad ten years instead. During this period they befriended Siegfried & Roy, incorporated their wives into their act (The Four Crocksons), and staged children's matinees in Dutch, German and English while residing in Spain for nightclub-shows. Their act was so successful that the brothers were invited to make their own television series under the scrutiny of Joop van den Ende.

== History ==
=== 1978–1982: First series and Circus Bassie en Adriaan ===
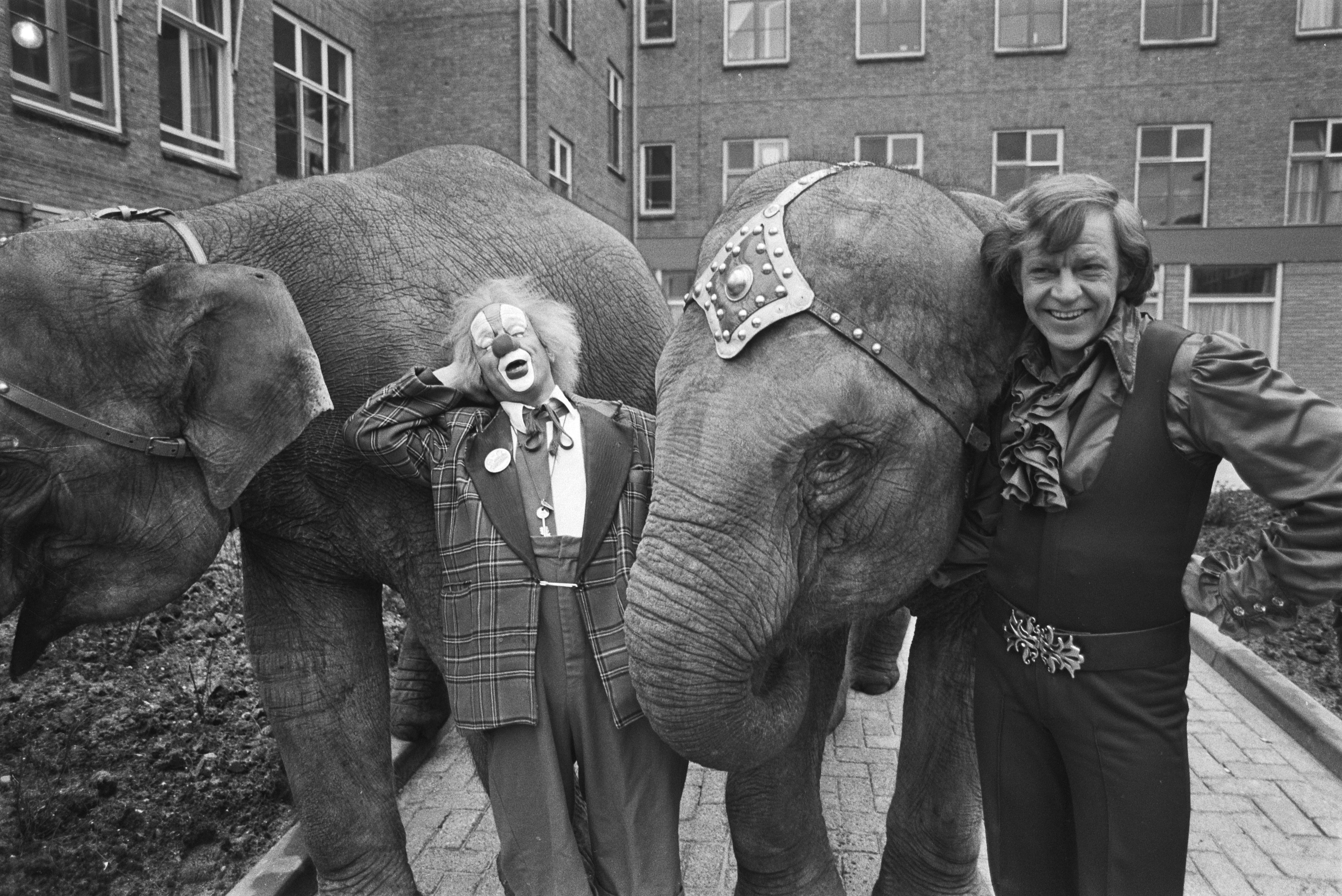
Bassie and Adriaan with their own circus animals.

In January 1978, TROS released the first series of Bassie & Adriaan, titled De avonturen van Bassie en Adriaan (The adventures of Bassie and Adriaan). With its crossover potential, the series became the most watched children's series of the first half of 1978. As a result, the show was soon renewed for a second season, which received just as high viewing figures. Within the space of two years, three series were shot and released.

In 1980, Joop van den Ende founded a circus around the duo and toured with it throughout the country. The circus proved popular in its first year and sold out nearly every single show.

=== 1982–1987: Closure of the circus, split from Joop van den Ende, split from and return to TROS ===
After the release of De huilende professor in 1982, TROS saw the appreciation ratings for the series go down and proposed the Van Toor brothers to put the series on halt for a year to give the older series more time to be rebroadcast. Bas van Toor claimed that TROS did not want the brothers anymore, while the head of entertainment of the broadcaster stated that the brothers were allowed to go to other broadcasters if they pleased.

Meanwhile, the brothers Van Toor also ended their long-term collaboration with producer Joop van den Ende after he left in his position of director at Circus Bassie & Adriaan, which left the brothers taking over the daily management of the business. The brothers were soon overworked and let the circus collapse in favour of their own well-being. On top of that, the costs had outweighed the earnings.

They then started their collaboration with Belgian broadcaster BRT, for which they produced several mini-series. BRT was also interested in commissioning a long series with proper episodes. In 1985, TROS commissioned a new series by the duo, which made their return to the TROS official.

=== 1987–1996: Later series ===
In 1987, the first season of their self-produced series was released: Het geheim van de schatkaart (The secret of the treasure map). It quickly became the most appreciated television program in the Netherlands, with an average of 7.7 out of 10. Its premiere on January 9, 1987 received a 7.6 and amassed an audience share of 11%, outscoring other popular television programs for adults. As a result of the success, the brothers received a contract to produce two more seasons, and went on to produce a total of five seasons.

All of the seasons in the self-produced series feature the Baron as the primary antagonist. In the first three seasons, his accomplices are Vlugge Japie (Quick Japie) and B2.

In the first episode of the fourth season, the three crooks are released from prison. B2 apparently did not hear that they're free and remains in his cell (which the Baron decides is fine). Vlugge Japie, sick of the Baron's obsession with Bassie and Adriaan, decides to abandon him.

The Baron searches for a new hideout, and decides to steal a yacht. On the yacht he makes a phone call, which is a key moment, as it is the first time the Baron reveals his last name. Up until then, he was known only as the Baron. He hires two new criminals: the explosives expert Handige Harry (Handy Harry) and a spy known only by the code name B100. These two are the Baron's sidekicks in the final two seasons of the self-produced series.

=== 1997–2003: Farewell tour and Aad van Toor's illness ===
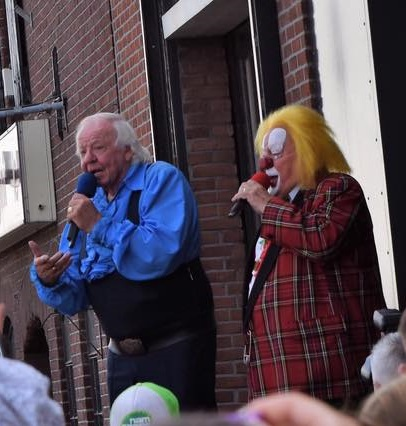
Bassie & Adriaan at the opening of their exhibition on July 8, 2017

In October 2002 Bassie & Adriaan announced their farewell tour. The final show, planned for January 4, 2004, was to include a guest appearance by the three crooks. However, the tour ended prematurely on July 31, 2003, as Aad van Toor was diagnosed with cancer. At the end of the last show, when his relatives brought him flowers, he burst into tears. "You want more?" he asked as usual. "Well so do I, but unfortunately I'm sick. I have to go to hospital".

=== 2003–present: Film appearance and revived success ===
In 2003, the Dutch branch of Nickelodeon bought the rights to show several seasons of Bassie & Adriaan on their channel. These reruns proved a success as it quickly became the channels most watched program at the time, collecting almost half a million viewers per episode. Aad van Toor hosted a special 24-hour marathon of episodes for the channel on New Year's Day 2004.

In September 2014, the show's theme song "Hallo Vriendjes" became a viral internet sensation when Dutch teens and students challenged their international friends to sing along to the lyrics.

In 2015, the Van Toor brothers played Bassie and Adriaan in the film Keet&Koen en de speurtocht naar Bassie & Adriaan.

In 2019, their production company started uploading their episodes on YouTube, after they had registered a channel in 2012. This proved popular, as their old episodes got over 90 million views all together. It led Veronica Superguide to joke that "you do not have to young and handsome to become a YouTube success." The brothers stated that they initially had wanted to sell their series to Netflix, but that Netflix had rejected them because of the series' poor picture quality.

The Van Toor brothers were in a long-term legal battle with actor Paul van Gorcum, who played the Baron in several series. Together with three other actors, they sued the Van Toor brothers over their own right to royalty payments for the series produced with Joop van den Ende. In 2020, the Rotterdam district court ruled that Van Toor brothers had to pay damages of €15,000 in total to four actors including Van Gorcum. This sum was significantly less than the claimed €193,000. The district court ruled that the actors had been underpaid, but that the claimed sum was disproportional to the screentime that the actors had had in series.

== Main characters ==
- Adriaan (Aad van Toor) - an acrobat in a blue (originally purple) 1970s-style satin shirt; his philosophy is: "Wat er ook gebeurt, altijd blijven lachen." ("Whatever happens, always keep smiling"). Adriaan is the wiser half of the duo, often creating solutions to their problems.
- Bassie (Bas van Toor) - ginger-haired red-nosed clown who wears a red tartan-jacket and green trousers. He's fond of cream cakes. His catchphrase is "Ik ben wel dom, maar niet slim." ("I may be dumb, but I'm not smart.") Bassie, being a clown, is often joking around and behaving irresponsibly, but he's very brave when necessary.
- De Baron (Paul van Gorcum)
- B2 (Joop Dikmans, Harry Dikmans)
- B100 (Hans Beijer)
- Handige Harry (Paul van Soest)
- Inspector De Vries (Dick Engelbracht)

== Episodes ==
| Year | Series | Original start date | Original end date | Audience grade |
|---|---|---|---|---|
| 1978 | De avonturen van Bassie en Adriaan | 10 January 1978 | 4 April 1978 | 7,1-7,5 |
Bassie and Adriaan find themselves abandoned by their own circus because they overslept, and with no tour-schedule in sight or any money they're forced to take other jobs but lose each one. A mischievous prankster ("plaaggeest") is responsible in part for their misery. Bassie and Adriaan are saved by a self-proclaimed free spirit called Douwe whom they meet on the work-floor. Adriaan suspects that Douwe is the "plaaggeest", but cannot prove it. Eventually, the "plaaggeest" stops pestering the duo. He sends them a letter saying he regrets his actions since he saw how Bassie and Adriaan make children laugh, and he's decided that making children laugh is a more worthy cause than causing misery. (Note: Aad van Toor later regretted not disclosing who the "plaaggeest" actually was, but many fans regard Douwe to be the culprit.) The series was later retitled to De plaaggeest.
| 1978-1979 | De nieuwe avonturen van Bassie en Adriaan | 9 October 1978 | 21 May 1979 | 7,1-7,5 |
Bassie and Adriaan take a well-earned holiday but find themselves chased by two diamond thieves, referred to only by their code names B1 and B2, who mistake Bassie for the go-between who came to collect the key to the vault of the stolen diamonds. B1 and B2 stage many fruitless efforts to get the key back in Spain, where Bassie and Adriaan are on their holiday. Upon their return at Rotterdam Airport, they finally manage to lure the clown and his pet bird Sweety to their car and drag him inside. When Adriaan manages to release Bassie, they set up a sting operation at Rotterdam's Central Station. The series was later retitled to het geheim van de sleutel
| 1979-1980 | De diamant | 17 November 1979 | 7 June 1980 | 7,1-7,5 |
Bassie and Adriaan have a diamond named after them. The diamond thieves from the previous series escape from prison and steal it, dressed up as Bassie and Adriaan. The actual Bassie and Adriaan are arrested but soon released because their fingerprints do not match those on the crime scene. Because of their damaged reputations, Bassie and Adriaan have to leave the circus. They are given three days to prove their innocence and they eventually do so using a secretly videotaped confession of the actual diamond thieves. Unable to return to their old circus afterwards, they now perform in their own circus, named after them.
| 1982 | De huilende professor | 4 April 1982 | 6 December 1982 | 7,1-7,5 |
Professor Archibald Chagrijn wants to expose the world to a gas that he invented ("griengas", crying gas) which makes people sad and causes them to cry. Bassie proves immune to the effects of the gas as he has had an overdose of laughing gas. The professor is hiding on the Canary Islands, but Bassie and Adriaan manage to track him down. This series also featured the last scenes with Sweety and the first with Robin, a robot born out of Bassie's attempt to fix an alarm clock and a radio by merging them into one.
| 1987 | Het geheim van de schatkaart | 2 January 1987 | 17 April 1987 | 7.7 |
Bassie and Adriaan buy a painting and find a treasure map on the back. Chased by three thieves, the Baron, Vlugge Japie and B2, they go to Lanzarote to find the treasure.
| 1988 | De verdwenen kroon | 5 January 1988 | 23 February 1988 | N/A |
The Baron, Vlugge Japie and B2 escape from prison and steal a crown from a museum. Bassie and Adriaan are instructed to bring the ransom money but they are heading for a trap, leaving themselves accused of pocketing the cash.
| 1989 | De verzonken stad | 6 October 1989 | 1 December 1989 | N/A |
Bassie and Adriaan are taking a holiday in Greece, trying to not involve themselves in any adventures. However, Bassie discovers an ancient stone with mysterious inscriptions that initially partially translate to "wise man", "power" and "whoever possesses this is the world's richest man". The Baron, Vlugge Japie and B2 also find themselves in Greece after escaping from prison. They eventually manage to steal the stone and try to translate the rest of the inscriptions. Eventually, Bassie and Adriaan discover that the criminals are also in Greece and try to catch them, once and for all.
| 1992 | De geheimzinnige opdracht | 7 February 1992 | 25 April 1992 | 7,6 |
A mysterious person sends Bassie and Adriaan all over Europe to collect parcels with riddles and tasks inside them. Meanwhile, The Baron, Vlugge Japie and B2 divert roads upon release from prison. The Baron, in search for new accomplices, recruits explosives expert Handige Harry and an anonymous man in a trench coat who adopts the code name B100. The crooks assume that Bassie and Adriaan are on another treasure hunting trip and are determined to get them. The series was produced as a tribute to the newly established European Community, which was founded in the year that the series was recorded. This series had an educational element about the visited countries. At later instances, the series was renamed De reis door Europa.
| 1994 | De reis vol verrassingen | 7 January 1994 | 13 May 1994 | N/A |
Bassie and Adriaan embark on another parcel hunting trip on Curaçao. However, this time, it's a booby trap set up by the Baron, Harry and B100. Vlugge Japie, now residing on the island, spoils everything by stealing the parcel. Back in the Netherlands, the crooks spot Bassie taking part in a television quiz, winning a trip through the United States. Bassie and Adriaan head off on a road trip, chased by the criminals.
| 1995-1996 | Liedjes uit grootmoeders tijd | 1 September 1995 | 11 August 1996 | N/A |
Bassie and Adriaan explore the Netherlands and sing classic children's songs.

== In other media ==
The characters received their own comic strip series between 1983 and 1985, drawn by Frans Verschoor.
