= Royal Theater Carré =

Theatre in Amsterdam, Netherlands

Coordinates: 52.3624°N 4.9042°E

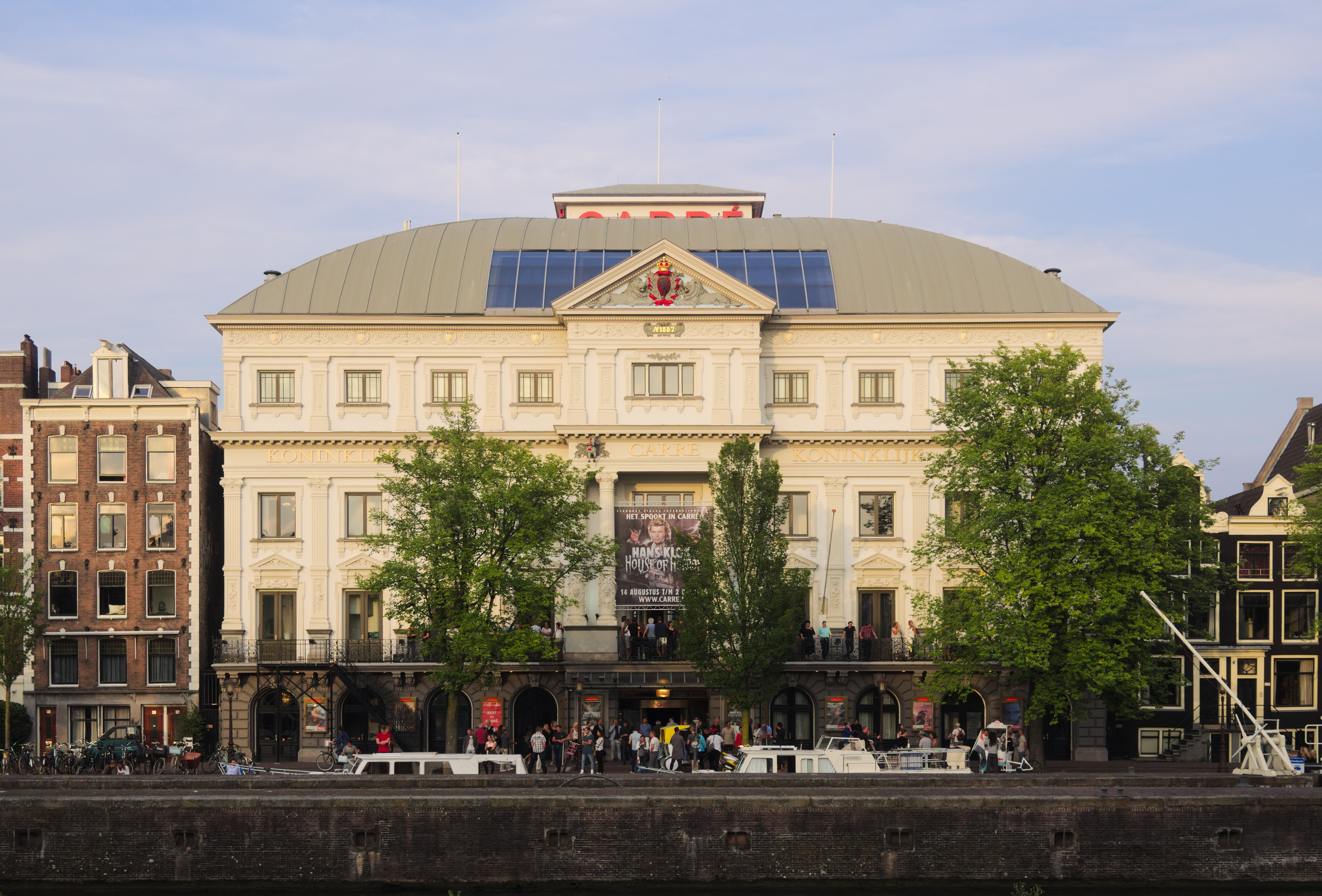
- Interactive map of Royal Theater Carré
- Address: Amstel 115; Amsterdam; Netherlands

Construction
- Opened: 1887; 139 years ago
- Architect: Jan van Rossem

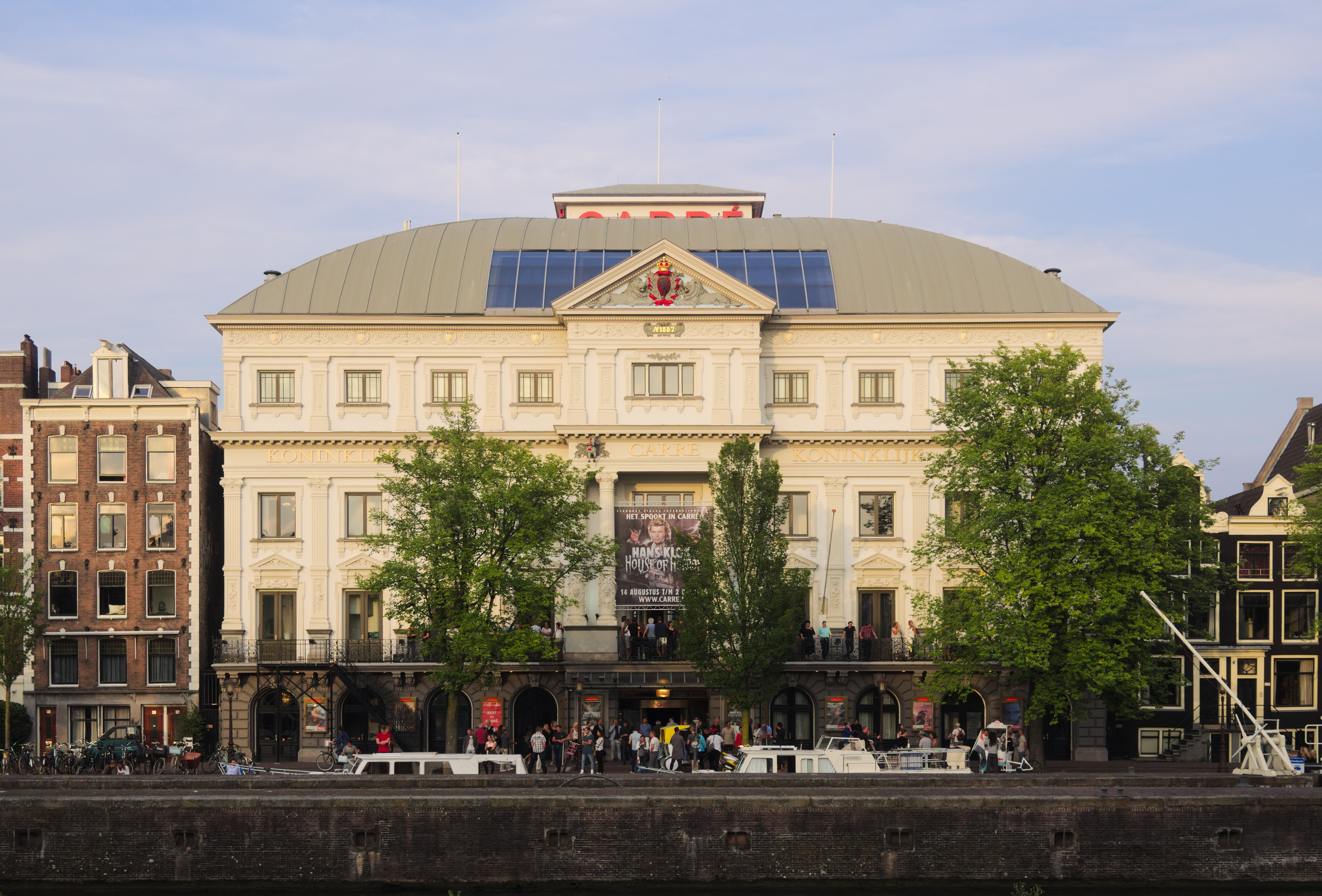
Carré seen from across the Amstel

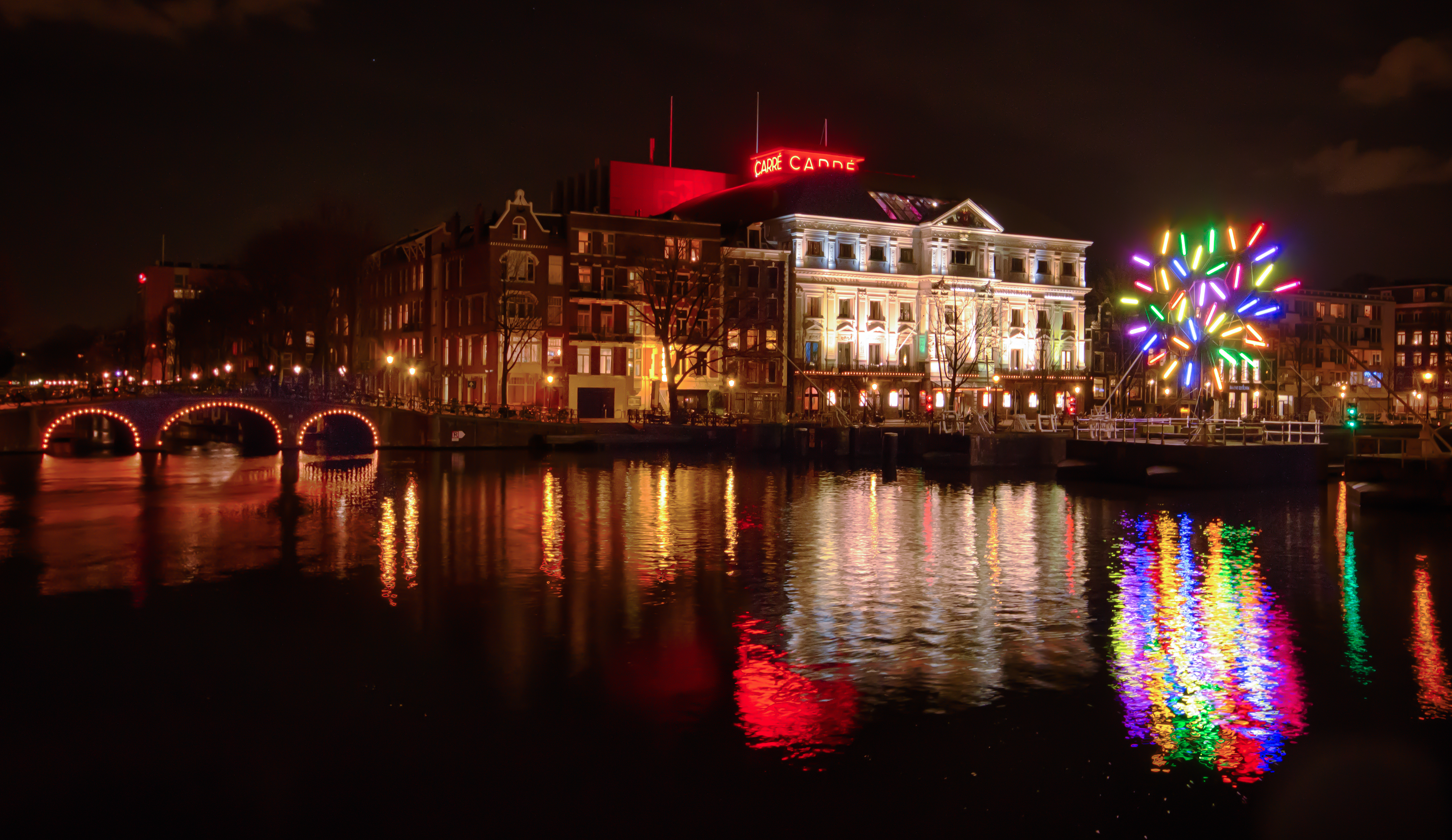
Carré during Light Festival 2013

The Royal Theater Carré (Dutch: Koninklijk Theater Carré) is a Neo-Renaissance theatre in Amsterdam, located near the river Amstel. When the theatre was founded in 1887, it was originally meant as a permanent circus building. Currently, it is mainly used for musicals, cabaret performances and pop concerts. Carré is located next to the Amstel, close to Waterlooplein. Its address is Amstel 115 and has approximately 1,700 seats.

== History ==
Carré is closely connected to the family Carré. This family group gave their first performances by the end of the 18th century and in 1863 they came to the Netherlands for the first time. In 1866 the German circus director Oscar Carré finally got permission to build his first stone theatre, replacing the Rooseboom windmill at the city locks of the river Amstel. On 3 December 1887 this building was officially opened. In the beginning, it was just a wooden building with a stone façade. It was immediately a big success. At first Carré was only used during the winter, the winter circus of Oscar Carré then performed but during the rest of the year this group travelled and the theatre was empty. However, in 1893 the theatre was rented by Dutch theatre producer Frits van Haarlem for his vaudeville shows in the summer, which meant that there were performances during the entire year. The shows became very successful, thus changing the circus building to a theatre for all forms of popular entertainment. Carré turned from a circus into a variété theatre (Dutch version of a music hall).

After the death of Oscar Carré in 1911 the theatre had a bad period. No profits were made even though several directors tried new things. Max Gabriël rebuilt the theatre, but this didn't work so he left only a year later. Boekholt brought a new program and new sorts of amusements, but this didn't work either. A business company that brought back the circus entertainment went bankrupt. In 1920, the venue's name was changed to Theater Carré. Finally (in 1924) two gentlemen named Benjamin and Content were able to make a profit with Carré. After Benjamin and Content, Alex Wunnink became the director. He was successful and brought many new shows, as well as a big profit. So, throughout the early 20th century the building was mainly used for vaudeville and revue shows, occasionally Italian operas and operettas. Dutch stars like Lou Bandy and Louis Davids and international celebrities like Josephine Baker and the clown Grock performed here.

During the Second World War, Carré attracted more custom, because people were searching for distraction. however, owing to the razias (police raids) in 1944, people started to stay away; the doors were closed from 1944 till 1945.

After the Second World War, revues and winter circuses remained popular. In 1956, Carré introduced musical theatre to the Netherlands with Porgy and Bess. The one-man show followed in 1963, when Toon Hermans gave his first solo cabaret show.

After the death of Alex Wunnik, his son Karel Wunnik became the new director. Under Karel Wunnik the theatre had serious problems. In 1968 Carré was bought with the intention to break it down and build a hotel on its place. After protests from artists, the municipality of Amsterdam finally refused permission for demolition. That's when the municipality of Amsterdam got involved. They made a new destination plan, and two years later it got a monumental status to protect the theatre. In 1974 Guus Osters became the new director, but he had difficulties attracting public. He had to take some serious measures but eventually a couple of new (and very successful) shows saved him and Carré.

In 1977, the municipality bought the building. In 1987, at the centenary, the Royal Predicate was granted and the name was changed to Koninklijk Theater Carré. In 2004, the theatre was completely renovated. The historic façade and interior design have been retained.

== The theatre nowadays ==
The Royal Theater Carré nowadays is still being used for show and performances such as musicals, dance, cabaret, stand up comedy, opera, operetta, theatre shows, classical concerts, pop concerts, and poetry. National and international popular artists perform regularly at Carré.

In the lobby, several statues have been placed depicting famous Dutch artists that have performed at Carré, like Toon Hermans, Jos Brink, Youp van 't Hek, Tineke Schouten and André van Duin. On occasion, when famous Dutch performers have died, their bodies are laid in repose in the theatre so that members of the public can pay their respect (e.g., Ramses Shaffy, Jos Brink).

On the top floor of the theatre there is a restaurant named Oscar's, after the famous founder of Carré.

== Artists ==
Some famous artists that have performed at Carré:

- Crowded House
- Kate Bush
- OMD
- Fairouz
- Louis Davids
- The Dubliners
- Sammy Davis Jr.
- The Jacksons
- Henriette Köhler
- Johan Buziau
- Sylvain Poons
- Lou Bandy
- Willy Walden
- Piet Muyselaar
- Toon Hermans
- Herman van Veen
- Van Morrison
- Genesis
- Jochem Myjer
- Paul van Vliet
- Freek de Jonge
- Youp van 't Hek
- Stanley Burleson
- Erik van Muiswinkel
- Pia Douwes
- Ruth Jacott
- Grock
- Josephine Baker
- Harry Belafonte
- Ivo Niehe
- Loreena McKennitt

== Groups ==
Several famous groups that have performed at Carré

- Nap de la Mar
- Meyer Hamel Revue
- Snip & Snap Revue
- Folies Bergères
- Lido de Paris
- Kinderen voor Kinderen
- The Dutch National Ballet

== Shows ==
- My Fair Lady
- Cats
- West Side Story
- Anatevka
- Ballet for Life
