= Gordon Heuckeroth =

Gordon
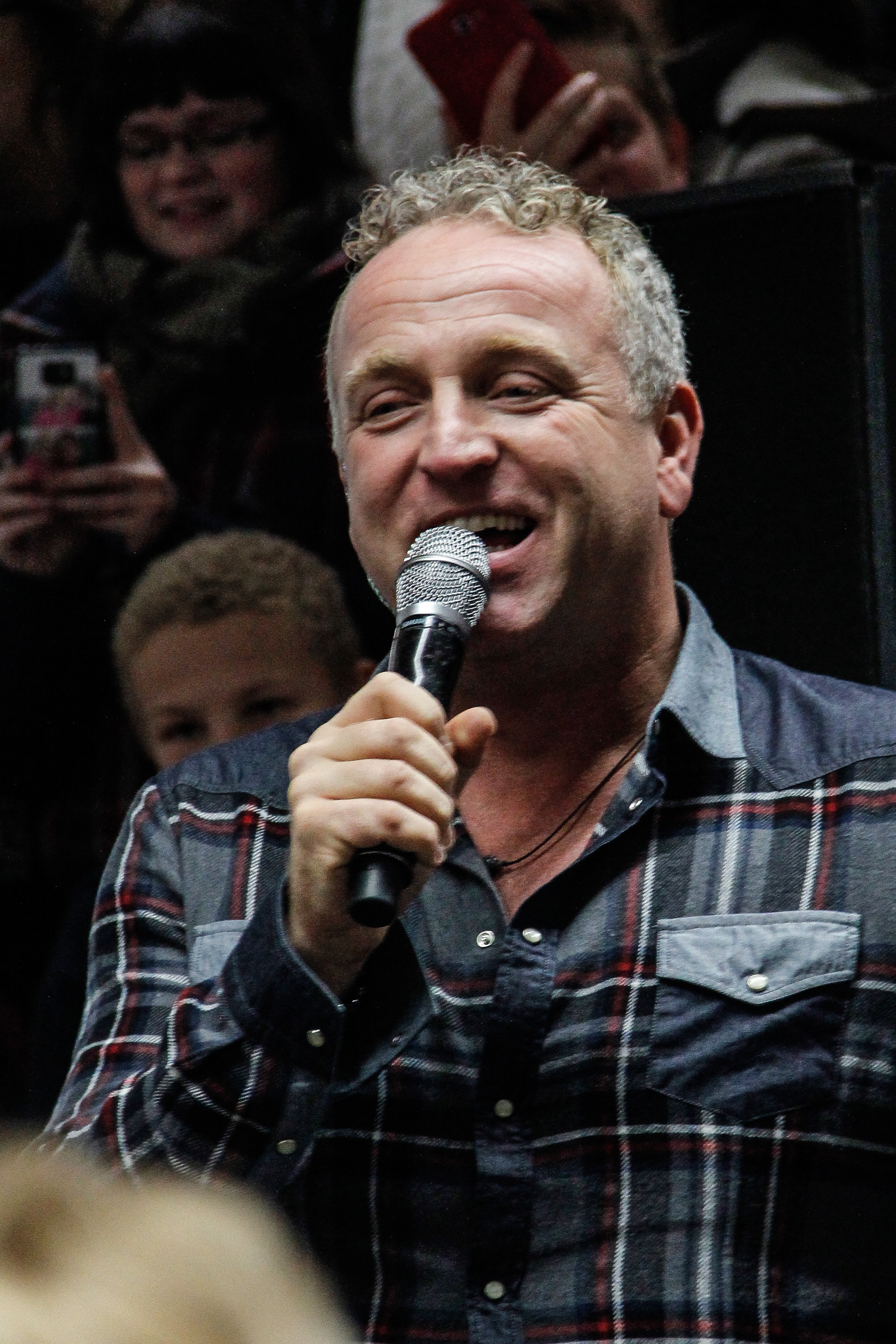
- Heuckeroth in 2013

Background information
- Born: Cornelis Willem Heuckeroth; 6 July 1968 (age 58); Amsterdam, Netherlands
- Genres: Dutch pop; levenslied
- Occupations: Singer; television personality
- Years active: 1986–present
- Labels: CNR, EMI
- Website: www.gordon.nl

Cornelis Willem "Gordon" Heuckeroth (Dutch: [ˈɡɔrdə(n) ˈɦøːkərɔt]; born 6 July 1968), known simply as Gordon, is a Dutch singer and television personality. Internationally, he is best known for his membership of the supergroup the Toppers, which represented the Netherlands in the Eurovision Song Contest 2009 with the song "Shine". He left the group in 2011.

== Career ==
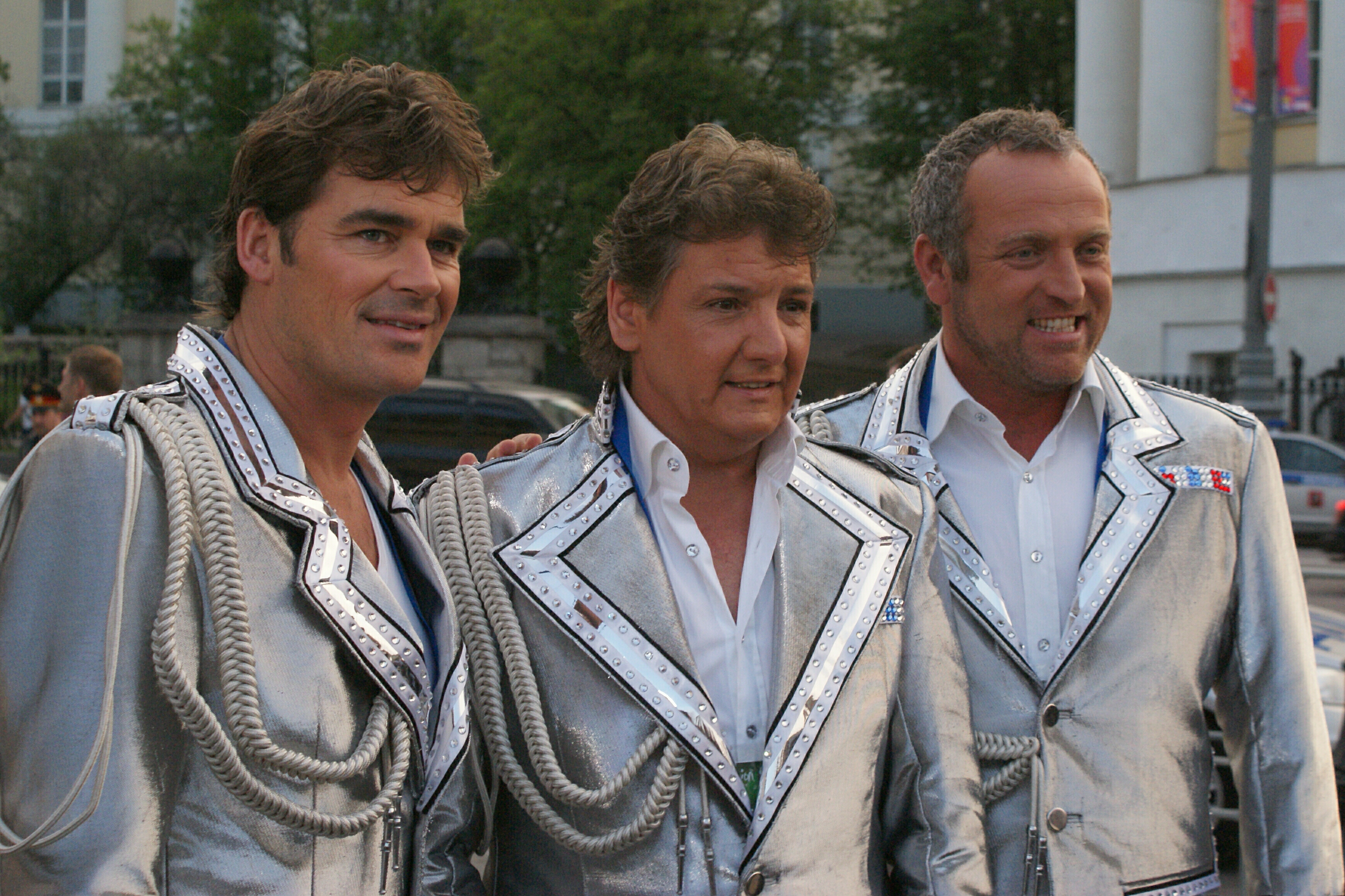
Gordon (right) with the Toppers in 2009

In 1990, Heuckeroth came ninth in the Nationaal Songfestival. In 1991, he had a Dutch number one hit with the single "Kon ik maar even bij je zijn" (If only I could be with you for just a while). In 2003, Heuckeroth again participated in the Nationaal Songfestival, finishing second after Esther Hart.

Heuckeroth joined Dutch singers Gerard Joling and René Froger in a series of concerts under the name the Toppers. The Toppers represented the Netherlands in the Eurovision Song Contest 2009 in Moscow, Russia, but did not qualify for the final, finishing in seventeenth place in the semi-final. In 2009, Heuckeroth left the Toppers, but re-joined the group a few weeks later. He permanently left the group in 2011.

=== Radio and television ===
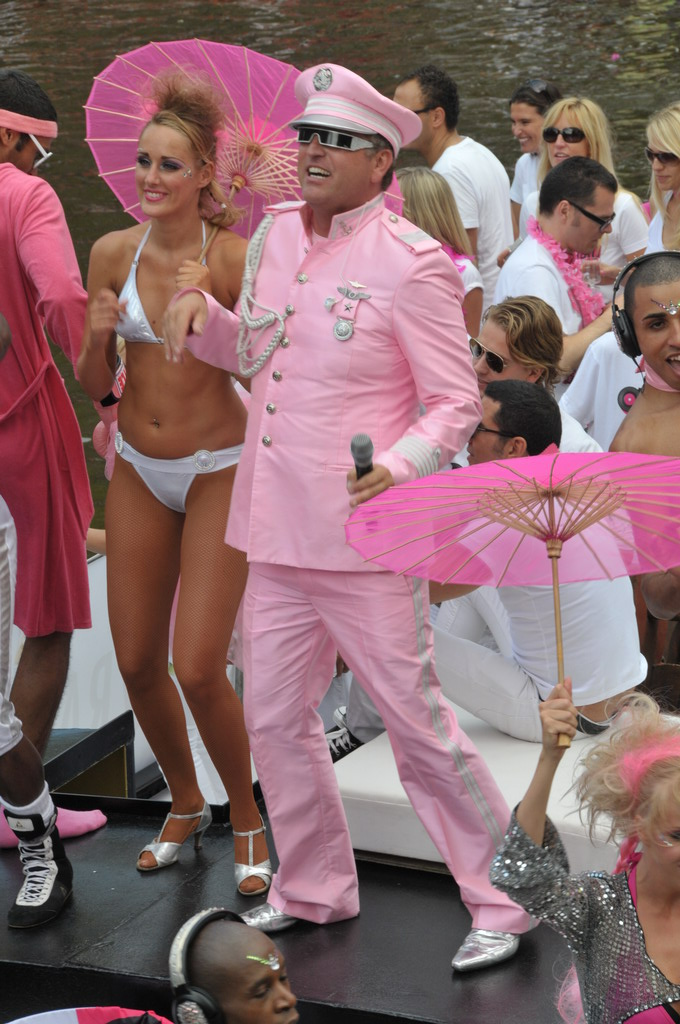
Gordon at the Amsterdam Gay Pride in 2008

From 2007 to 2008, Heuckeroth had his own radio show on Radio 538. On television, he was part of the jury of Idols in 2007, X Factor from 2009 to 2013, Holland's Got Talent from 2010 to 2017, and The Voice Senior in 2018.

In 2013, Heuckeroth received widespread criticism for a viral video in which he is seen making racist jokes about a Chinese Holland's Got Talent contestant.

Since September 2025, Gordon and Froukje de Both present the morning radio show Gordon & Froukje. In November 2025, Jan-Paul Grootentraast became presenter of the show. As of June 2026, the show is scheduled to end in July 2026 and Jan-Willem Roodbeen and Jeroen Kijk in de Vegte are scheduled to succeed Gordon and De Both in September 2026.

=== Other activities ===
In March 2021, Heuckeroth presented a petition to Sander Dekker, caretaker Minister for Legal Protection, calling for an identification requirement for social media accounts. He wanted an end to anonymous threats and homophobia that he and others had received. Dekker called it an interesting proposal that he would take up with European colleagues.

He is the owner of The Burger Room, a Wizard of Oz themed restaurant and bar in Amsterdam.

== Discography ==
- Kon Ik Maar Even Bij Je Zijn (CNR Music, 1992)
- Alles Wat Ik Ben (1993)
- Now Is The Time (CNR Music, 1994)
- Kon Ik Maar Even Bij Je Zijn (2 CD; 1995)
- Je Bent Wie Je Bent Schatje (1995)
- De Tijd Van Mijn Leven (1996)
- Omdat Ik Zo Van Je Hou (CNR Music, 1996)
- Gordon & Re-Play (Dino Music, 2002) featuring Re-Play
- Gordon & (Dino Music, 2003)
- A Song For You (Rodeo Media, 2008)
- Liefde Overwint Alles (Berk Music, 2013)
- Compleet, Volmaakt, Het Einde (Berk Music, 2016) featuring Metropole Orkest
