= 2025 in Dutch television =

This is a list of events that took place in 2025 related to television in the Netherlands.

== Events ==
- 4 January – Soy Kroon wins the sixth season of The Masked Singer.
- 31 January – Journalist and writer Frank Heinen wins the 25th season of De slimste mens. This was the last season of the show presented by Philip Freriks with Maarten van Rossem as jury member.
- 8 March – Roos Moggré wins the 25th season of Wie is de Mol?.
- 21 March – Anouk Wolf wins the first season of the talent show The Headliner.
- 4 April – Jordy de Maar wins Big Brother 2025, the fifth cooperation season of the Dutch and Belgian version of Big Brother.
- 26 April – Humberto Tan wins the fifth season of the drag queen show Make Up Your Mind.
- 17 May – Claude represents the Netherlands in the final of the Eurovision Song Contest 2025.
- 4 July – Christiaan Bauer and Julia Heetman win the fifth season of De Verraders.
- 9 July – Irene Moors wins the fourth season of the photography show Het Perfecte Plaatje op Reis.
- 12 July – Numidia wins the second season of Stars on Stage.
- 18 October – Neurobiologist Brankele Frank wins the 26th season of De slimste mens. This was the first season of the show with Herman van der Zandt as presenter and Paulien Cornelisse as jury member.
- 13 December – Meadow represents the Netherlands at the Junior Eurovision Song Contest 2025 held in Tbilisi, Georgia.
- 20 December – Merel Westrik wins the anniversary season of Wie is de Mol?.
- 21 December – Shai wins the thirteenth season of Heel Holland Bakt.
- 28 December – Camiel Kesbeke wins Expeditie Robinson 2025.

== Debuts ==
- 3 January – Blauw, documentary series about the Dutch police
- 6 January – Grote Gezinnen, Grote Vakanties, television show about big families going on holiday
- 6 January – Nieuws van de Dag, news show presented by Art Rooijakkers and Malou Petter
- 12 January – Een Buitengewoon Gesprek, show in which a Dutch celebrity is interviewed by 32 people with autism
- 13 January – De Cirkel, quiz show presented by Sanne Wallis de Vries
- 19 January – De Gezonken Meesters, television show presented by Dionne Stax in which artists recreate artworks by Dutch artists
- 19 January – Cruise Life, show presented by Chimène van Oosterhout about a cruise aboard the Rotterdam cruise ship of the Holland America Line.
- 24 January – The Headliner, talent show presented by Jim Bakkum and Marieke Elsinga
- 2 February – De Wit en de Brit, show about Brexit presented by Tim de Wit
- 5 February – Het mondkapjesgoud, documentary series about the controversial face mask deal by Sywert van Lienden and others during the COVID-19 pandemic in the Netherlands
- 5 February – Het verhaal van Nederland – Amsterdam, docudrama series about the history of Amsterdam, Netherlands (Het verhaal van Nederland)
- 6 February – The Best of Pop, music show presented by Diederik Ebbinge
- 8 February – Rachel & Elbert passen op, show presented by Rachel Rosier and Elbert Smelt about an animal shelter
- 8 February – 10 jaar MINDF*CK, three-part special presented by Victor Mids about 10 years of the show MINDF*CK
- 16 February – De Opvolging, documentary about Jonnie and Thérèse Boer, owners of the restaurant De Librije in Zwolle, Netherlands
- 16 February – The Summit, survival television show presented by Beau van Erven Dorens
- 20 February – De Schatkamer van André van Duin, television special about the career of comedian André van Duin
- 20 February – Hel of hotel, television show in which six Dutch celebrities stay in a prison
- 23 February – Van Moskou tot Maidan, documentary series about Ukraine and the Russian invasion of Ukraine presented by Jelle Brandt Corstius
- 27 February – Bizarre Erfenissen, show about inheritances presented by Maarten Steendam
- 5 March – Elixer, drama series
- 5 March – Villa Nadia, talk show presented by Nadia Moussaid
- 9 March – Denkend aan Vlaanderen, show about Flanders presented by Janny van der Heijden and André van Duin
- 14 March – Herman van Veen 80!, three-part documentary series presented by Ivo Niehe about stage performer Herman van Veen
- 14 March – Het Holland Huis, music show focused on Dutch music presented by Roxeanne Hazes
- 15 March – De Alleskunner Duo's, version of the show De Alleskunner in which duos compete in challenges
- 15 March – Talent Unplugged, acoustic music talent show presented by Edwin Evers
- 17 March – Chateau Meiland: La Dolce Vita, show about the Meiland family searching for a holiday home in Italy
- 18 March – De Boer Op, show about farmers moving abroad
- 22 March – 45 Jaar Bananasplit, six-part anniversary series presented by Frans Bauer about the television show Bananasplit
- 22 March – De Freek tapes, show about nature documentaries made by biologist Freek Vonk at a young age
- 24 March – Lubach, satirical news show presented by Arjen Lubach
- 27 March – Bloed, Zweet en Tranen, documentary series about singer André Hazes
- 28 March – Only Joling, reality series centered around Gerard Joling
- 30 March – Date on Stage, dating show set on a stage
- 31 March – Van binnen stroomt het, documentary series about children's feelings of insecurity and intimacy
- 31 March – Strijders, competitive show with physical challenges presented by Jeroen van Koningsbrugge
- 4 April – Koers van de Kameraden, show about amateur cyclists
- 7 April – Opgelicht in de Liefde, show about romance scams presented by Ellie Lust
- 13 April – De Klassenavond, show presented by Rob Kamphues
- 17 April – Amsterdam CS 24/7, documentary series about Amsterdam Centraal station
- 21 April – 15 jaar The Passion, special about 15 years of The Passion, a Dutch Passion Play held every Maundy Thursday since 2011
- 24 April – Bureau Onrecht, television series about injustice presented by Dennis van der Geest
- 24 April – Zorgen, six-part documentary series about nursing students
- 29 April – Jelies & Gnodde: Grote Gezinnen Emigreren, television series about two large families moving abroad
- 2 May – De Vuurwerkramp, drama series about the Enschede fireworks disaster on 13 May 2000
- 4 May – De Onbekende Soldaat: Erik Hazelhoff Roelfzema, documentary about Dutch resistance fighter Erik Hazelhoff Roelfzema
- 12 May – Hazes & Hoogkamer: Tot Uw Dienst, show presented by André Hazes and Mart Hoogkamer
- 13 May – De middag van 2000, documentary about the Enschede fireworks disaster on 13 May 2000
- 18 May – Knappe Koppen, show about medical research
- 20 May – Verbouwing van de eeuw, show presented by Anita Witzier about renovating a monumental building
- 24 May – De Kwis met Ballen VIPS, quiz show De Kwis met Ballen with celebrities
- 26 May – Goedenavond Nederland, talk show presented by Sam Hagens and Welmoed Sijtsma
- 2 June – Vier Avonden op Rij, talk show presented by Hila Noorzai
- 5 June – Dubbel Gestraft, six-part documentary by Jessica Villerius about the justice system
- 6 June – Oorlogsalbums, two-part series presented by Philip Freriks about photo albums of unknown soldiers
- 28 June – Herman van Veen viert 600 keer in Carré, show about Herman van Veen's 600th show in Royal Theater Carré
- 29 June – Het waren 2 fantastische dagen, show in which three people spend two days together
- 3 July – Micks Misdaaddossier: The Pink Panthers, crime show presented by crime journalist Mick van Wely
- 12 July – De Volgers, game show presented by Dyantha Brooks
- 19 July – De Allesweter VIPS, quiz show, similar to De Alleskunner
- 20 July – Your Place or Mine, dating show
- 20 July – Addy 75 jaar, documentary about fashion designer Addy van den Krommenacker
- 20 July – Hart tegen Hart, quiz show presented by Harm Edens
- 9 August – Let's play ball, game show presented by Jan Versteegh
- 18 August – In Mallorca: de nacht en de nasleep, two-part documentary series by Jessica Villerius about the murder of Carlo Heuvelman
- 30 August – Briljante Breinen, quiz show presented by Linda de Mol
- 31 August – RTL Tonight, talk show presented by Beau van Erven Dorens, Humberto Tan, Leonie ter Braak and Renze Klamer
- 1 September – Prijzenjacht, game show presented by Rob Janssen
- 4 September – Bij De Jonge Adel: Van de jacht tot het bal, show about young people of nobility
- 16 September – Rutger en de Uitkeringstrekkers, show about people with welfare benefits presented by Rutger Castricum
- 21 September – Joodse Wereld, talk show about the Jewish community
- 1 October – Leven tot het Laatst, show presented by Anita Witzier about people close to the end of their life
- 8 October – Ewout: Gevaarlijke Gevangenissen, show presented by Ewout Genemans about prisons abroad
- 11 October – Alle Remmen Los!, show presented by Airen Mylene and Jan Versteegh
- 11 October – Stars on Stage: Soldaat van Oranje, television special in which contestants of Stars on Stage sing songs of the musical Soldaat van Oranje
- 25 October – Red Bull Stalen Ros, show presented by Airen Mylene and Jan Versteegh
- 30 October – Onvergetelijke Liedjes, music show presented by Simon Keizer
- 31 October – Vuurtorenverhalen, show about lighthouses in the Netherlands presented by Kefah Allush
- 2 November – Het Zwaard van Damocles, competitive reality show presented by Art Rooijakkers
- 10 November – Gelukkig Hebben We De Foto's Nog, show presented by Humberto Tan in which he travels with others to destinations around the world to take photos
- 12 November – In de voetsporen van de jaren 80, show about the 1980s presented by Philip Freriks
- 12 November – Kasteel Gekocht, Wat Nu?, show which looks at couples that have bought a castle in France
- 24 November – De Hanslers: van de Piste naar de Playa, reality series
- 11 December – Badgast, drama series
- 15 December – Jesse's Strijd, documentary presented by Sinan Can about Jesse who died in the Russo-Ukrainian war
- 22 December – Recht Door Zeeman, show presented by Thijs Zeeman
- 22 December – Taboes, series about taboo subjects presented by Robbert Rodenburg
- 27 December – Frans & Mariska, Stellen op de Proef, reality show about Frans Bauer and Mariska Bauer
- 28 December – De Bondgenoten Kerstspecial, television special about the reality series De Bondgenoten
- 29 December – Je weet niet dat je date, dating show with hidden cameras
- 30 December – Eva & Dijkgraaf: Het college van 2025, television special with Eva Jinek and Robbert Dijkgraaf about artificial intelligence

== Deaths ==
- 17 January – Manuëla Kemp, 61, singer and television presenter (Eigen Huis & Tuin).
- 3 February – Ferd Hugas, 87, actor and screenwriter.
- 9 February – Sigrid Koetse, 89, actress.
- 10 February – Ron Brandsteder, 74, comedian, singer, and television presenter.
- 2 March – Dieuwertje Blok, 67, actress, writer and television presenter (Het Sinterklaasjournaal), cancer.
- 7 March – Brûni Heinke, 84, actress (Goede tijden, slechte tijden, Soldier of Orange, Spetters), cancer.
- 23 March – Bram Biesterveld, 86, actor.
- 27 March – Loretta Schrijver, 68, newsreader and television presenter, colon cancer.
- 5 April – Harmen Siezen, 84, newsreader (NOS Journaal) and journalist.
- 3 June – Piet Kamerman, 99, actor (De Stille Kracht, Baantjer).
- 24 July – Chiel Montagne, 80, television presenter and radio DJ.
- 14 August – Ingeborg Elzevier, 89, actress (Kinderen geen bezwaar, The Dress, Grimm).
- 13 September – Gerard Cox, 85, singer and actor (Toen Was Geluk Heel Gewoon, The Debut), esophageal cancer.
- 16 September – Joke Bruijs, 73, actress, singer and cabaret artist (Toen Was Geluk Heel Gewoon).
- 22 September – André Landzaat, 81, actor (General Hospital, Medisch Centrum West). (death announced on this date)
- 23 September – Coby Timp, 95, actress.
- 3 November – Joost Prinsen, 83, television presenter (De Stratemakeropzeeshow, Het Klokhuis), cancer and complications from a stroke.
- 6 November – Viola Holt, 76, television presenter.
- 20 November – Paul van Gorcum, 91, actor (Bassie & Adriaan, Turkish Delight) and voice actor (Efteling).
- 8 December – Hans Otjes, 78, actor and comedian.

== See also ==
- 2025 in the Netherlands
