= 2026 in Dutch television =

This is a list of events taking place in 2026 relating to television in the Netherlands.

== Events ==
- 4 January – Harrie Snijders wins the first season of Het Zwaard van Damocles.
- 9 January – April Darby wins the seventh season of The Masked Singer.
- 1 February – Jamai Loman wins the eighth season of Maestro.
- 21 February – Pascale Kuiper wins the first season of The Winner Takes It All.
- 21 February – Mandy Woelkens wins the first season of Pandora.
- 26 February – Tommy van Lent wins the 2026 season of No Way Back VIPS.
- 2 April – Géza Weisz and Robert van Hemert win the sixth season of De Verraders.
- 10 April – Frank van Leeuwen wins the 27th season of De slimste mens.
- 26 April – Willem Voogd wins the first season of The Box.
- 2 May – Bram Krikke wins the 26th season of Wie is de Mol?.
- 8 May – Ruben Hillen wins season 13 of The Voice of Holland.
- 15 July – Jan Kooijman wins the fifth season of Het Perfecte Plaatje op Reis.
- 24 October – Maria represents the Netherlands at the Junior Eurovision Song Contest 2026 held in Malta.
- 6 November – Mats Akkerman wins the 28th season of De slimste mens.

== Debuts ==
- 1 January – Als IK het zing, singing show presented by Carrie ten Napel
- 2 January – Oh Oh Den Haag, reality show about people from The Hague, Netherlands
- 3 January – Pandora, reality game show presented by Ruben Nicolai
- 3 January – The Winner Takes It All, game show presented by Hélène Hendriks
- 5 January – Meldkamer Utrecht Centraal, show about the NS Veiligheid & Service department of the Dutch railways
- 11 January – Postcode Loterij in de Ring, quiz show presented by Linda de Mol
- 14 January – Fase 8: Femicide, documentary series about femicide
- 18 January – Alpha 00, police drama series
- 19 January – De Hygiënepolitie, show about cleanliness presented by Rob Geus
- 19 January – Klaas aan het Front, show in which Klaas Dijkhoff explores whether the Netherlands is prepared for war
- 19 January – Nog Eén Keer Fit, show presented by Rutger Castricum in which Wesley Sneijder, Wim Kieft and Royston Drenthe train to regain their fitness
- 4 February – De Boogaartjes, real-life soap series about the Bogaart family
- 10 February – Over de A4, show about the A4 motorway
- 21 February – 40 dagen van je leven, show about fasting presented by Anita Witzier and Klaas van Kruistum
- 28 February – Arbeidsvitaminen Quiz, music quiz show presented by Hans Schiffers and Soy Kroon, in celebration of 80 years of the radio show Arbeidsvitaminen
- 8 March – Klinkt als een Sekte, show presented by Israel van Dorsten about people living in isolated communities
- 8 March – The Box, adventure game show presented by Beau van Erven Dorens in which contestants begin the show in a box located somewhere in the Netherlands
- 14 March – Het Diner, psychological reality show presented by Raymond Thiry
- 14 March – I've Got The Music In Me, music show presented by Johnny de Mol
- 23 March – De Instagram Moord, documentary by John van den Heuvel about a livestreamed murder in 2021
- 24 March – Een vergetelijk mooie reis, show about people with dementia presented by Paul de Leeuw
- 30 March – Pokerface, quiz show presented by Johnny de Mol
- 31 March – Keurmeesters, show in which people who are not art experts discuss works of art
- 2 April – Simone en de Roofstaat, show about the Dutch colonial empire presented by Simone Weimans
- 11 April – Op zee gebleven, two-part television series about lost fishing vessels
- 16 April – Survive Your Family, survival game show presented by Art Rooijakkers
- 19 April – The Bicycle Race, show presented by Jan Versteegh in which contestants cycle through India
- 27 April – Koningsdagspecial of The Masked Singer, television special of The Masked Singer for Koningsdag 2026
- 30 April – De Brief, documentary by Tom Egbers about the life and death of Jetty van Thijn during World War II
- 1 May – Dit Is 50 Jaar Veronica, television special about the 50th anniversary of Veronica
- 1 May – Jan-Willem Ruimt Op!, television show presented by Jan-Willem Roodbeen and Jeroen Kijk in de Vegte
- 4 May – The Moneymakers, show in which contestants are tasked with making money
- 9 May – Meesterlijk IJs, show about ice cream presented by Robèrt van Beckhoven and Miljuschka Witzenhausen
- 9 May – The House of Hide and Seek, hide and seek game show presented by Jamai Loman and Buddy Vedder
- 10 May – Die Andere Late Night, show presented by Jörgen Raymann
- 14 May – Dankjewel Lenny, show about singer-songwriter Lenny Kuhr's emigration to Israel
- 18 May – Huizenruilers, show presented by John Williams in which people swap homes
- 18 May – Het Dubbelleven van Marijn Kuipers, documentary about Marijn Kuipers' struggles with bulimia
- 25 May – Daten in het Dorp: op Texel, dating show about people living in Texel presented by Emma Wortelboer
- 25 May – A.S.S. De Anti Survival Show, survival show presented by Gwen van Poorten
- 30 May – Over Leven, documentary about the life and death of journalist and presenter Clairy Polak
- 6 June – Etty, six-part television series based on the life of Dutch Jewish author Etty Hillesum
- 7 June – De WK Kwis, quiz show about the history of the FIFA World Cup presented by Johnny de Mol
- 8 June – Goed Verhaal, show presented by Erik Dijkstra about stories
- 11 June – Het Oranje Café, show about the 2026 FIFA World Cup presented by Sam van Royen
- 12 June – Mischa en de Mannen die het Beter Weten, show in which Mischa Blok interviews Wierd Duk, Maarten van Rossem, Victor Vlam en Maurice de Hond
- 28 June – De Verloskundigen, ten-part television series about midwives
- 29 June – Ongelijke Behandeling, three-part documentary series about inequality in healthcare presented by Gerri Eickhof
- 12 July – INFARCT, documentary about Viggo Waas's cerebral infarction which happened in March 2021
- 20 July – Nederland met vakantie, show about holidays presented by Vivienne van den Assem, Eddy Zoëy and Kees Tol
- 26 July – Los Het Op!, game show presented by Jeroom and Daphne Bunskoek
- 26 July – Mi Dushi: Wat is dan liefde?, show presented by Wilfred Genee in which celebrity couples are interviewed about their relationship
- 23 August – Beestenboel, show about animals presented by André van Duin and Janny van der Heijden
- 1 September – De Meestergids, show presented by Özcan Akyol in which contestants become a museum guide
- 5 September – Maarten & Philip op het spoor door Europa, travel show presented by Philip Freriks and Maarten van Rossem in which they travel through Europe by train
- 5 September – Dit weet jij niet?!, quiz show presented by Art Rooijakkers
- 6 September – Margreet Dolman begrijpt het, show presented by Paul Haenen as his alter ego Margreet Dolman
- 7 September – Buzz, show about entertainment presented by Iris Enthoven and Wiesje Hillen
- 7 September – True Crime Today, show about crime presented by Kirsten Westrik and Nochtli Peralta Alvarez
- 26 September – De Hopi Snelle Show, children's television show hosted by Jandino Asporaat
- 28 September – Thuis aan Tafel, show presented by Hugo Kennis and Caroline Tensen about food and lifestyle
- 10 October – Premiejagers, reality game show presented by Jan Versteegh
- 24 October – Hitster, music television show presented by Chantal Janzen
- 24 October – Nederlands Domste, game show presented by Monica Geuze and Edson da Graça
- 24 October – Oog om Oog, quiz show presented by Dyantha Brooks
- 27 October – Scheveningen: Dag & Nacht, show about Scheveningen
- 29 October – Wat Speelt Er, improvisation comedy show presented by Patrick Lodiers
- 1 November – Vier Linkerhanden, show presented by Wilfred Genee about conversations with guests while working on a do it yourself project
- 4 November – Pro Deo, television series
- 7 November – Sing With Me, singing competition show presented by Jaap Reesema
- 9 November – Pietentijd, show about Sinterklaas
- 13 December – Soulsister – Shirma & Matthijs in het voetspoor van Aretha, show about the life of Aretha Franklin presented by Shirma Rouse and Matthijs van Nieuwkerk
- Unknown – 2 Vreemden onder 1 Dak, show in which two strangers explore whether they can find a home together

== Deaths ==
- 5 January – Elsje de Wijn, 82, actress and singer. (death announced on this date)
- 5 January – Ad van Kempen, 81, actor (1-900, 'n Beetje Verliefd, Winter in Wartime), prostate cancer.
- 12 January – Robert Jensen, 52, television personality (Jensen!), cardiac arrest.
- 13 January – Annemarie Prins, 93, actress (Accused, Memory Lane), director and writer.
- 7 February – Nico de Haan, 78, birdwatcher and television presenter.
- 10 February – Femke Boersma, 90, actress (Het Wonderlijke leven van Willem Parel, Pastorale 1943).
- 21 February – Koos Postema, 93, radio and television presenter.
- 6 March – Jan Lenferink, 80, radio and television presenter.
- 10 March – IJf Blokker, 95, actor (De Fred Haché Show, Zeg 'ns Aaa, Van Oekel's Discohoek), musician, and presenter.
- 25 March – Esther Roord, 61, actress.
- 11 April – Sonja Barend, 86, television presenter.
- 15 May – Bas Westerweel, 62, radio and television presenter (Het Klokhuis).
- 10 June – Wim T. Schippers, 83, comedian (De Fred Haché Show, Van Oekel's Discohoek), actor and visual artist (Torentje van Drienerlo).
- 12 June – Lettie Oosthoek, 88, actress (Flodder, Dossier Verhulst, Flodders in America).
- 14 July – Cees Geel, 61, actor (Simon, Anne Frank: The Whole Story, Too Fat Too Furious), cardiac arrest.
- 6 August – Peter Faber, 82, actor (A Bridge Too Far, Soldier of Orange, Max Havelaar), heart disease.
- 24 August – Tanja Koen, 100, television presenter.
- 30 September – Paulien Cornelisse, 50, writer and television presenter (Tokidoki, jury member in De slimste mens), cancer.
- 17 October – Maarten Spanjer, 73, actor (Spetters, Kameleon 2, All Things Pass) and writer, prostate cancer.
- 27 October – Bram van Erkel, 94, television director.

== See also ==
- 2026 in the Netherlands
