= 2024 in Dutch television =

This is a list of events that took place in 2024 related to television in the Netherlands.

== Events ==
- 26 January – Joes Brauers wins the 23rd season of De slimste mens.
- 9 February – Michel Mulder wins the first season of Stars on Stage.
- 9 March – Fons Hendriks wins the 24th season of Wie is de Mol?.
- 14 April – Glenn van Himst wins Big Brother 2024, the fourth cooperation season of the Dutch and Belgian version of Big Brother.
- 3 May – Tristan Eisank wins the fourth season of De Verraders.
- 11 May – Joost Klein is disqualified and does not represent the Netherlands in the final of the Eurovision Song Contest 2024.
- 5 July – Julia wins the first season of Bestemming X.
- 30 August – Herman van der Zandt wins the 24th season of De slimste mens.
- 17 October – André van Duin receives the Gouden Televizier Oeuvre-Ring award for his entire oeuvre. He is the fifth person to receive this award since 1964.
- 2 November – Niels Oosthoek wins the 2024 Halloween season of De Verraders.
- 16 November – Stay Tuned represent the Netherlands at the Junior Eurovision Song Contest 2024 held in Madrid, Spain.
- 18 December – Antoinette Hertsenberg wins the ninth season of Het Perfecte Plaatje.
- 29 December – Kiran Badloe wins Expeditie Robinson 2024.

== Debuts ==
- 5 January – Stars on Stage, musical theatre performance show presented by Jamai Loman and Buddy Vedder
- 1 February – Project Dans, dance competition show
- 13 February – We Gaan er Allemaal Aan (zelfs Valerio Zeno), documentary series presented by Valerio Zeno about the end of humanity
- 25 February – Welkom bij de Oranjes, children's version of Het Verhaal van Nederland - Oranje Nassau
- 6 March – Tijl in het Voetspoor van Richard Wagner, show about composer Richard Wagner presented by Tijl Beckand
- 10 March – De Oranjezondag, talk show presented by Hélène Hendriks
- 11 March – Bodem, comedy-drama series created by Eva Crutzen
- 11 March – Say Whut?!, quiz presented by Niek Roozen
- 2 April – Corsokoorts in Sint Jansklooster, reality series about preparations for the annual bloemencorso in Sint Jansklooster
- 2 April – Daar Gaan Ze Weer, reality series which takes place abroad
- 3 April – De Piano, Dutch version of the British music competition show The Piano, presented by Chantal Janzen
- 3 April – Zussen, drama series
- 12 April – Liefde voor het Landgoed, reality series which follows owners of castles and estates
- 10 May – Bestemming X, adventure show presented by Nasrdin Dchar
- 16 May – Over de oceaan, sailing television show in which six celebrities sail across the Atlantic Ocean
- 4 June – Het Kinderziekenhuis, reality series about the Wilhelmina Kinderziekenhuis, a children's hospital in Utrecht, Netherlands
- 12 August – Wat een dag, news quiz show presented by Leonie ter Braak
- 26 August – Bar Laat, talk show presented by Sophie Hilbrand and Jeroen Pauw
- 1 September – Dit is Tijs, talk show presented by Tijs van den Brink
- 2 September – Een Eigen Huis, competitive television show with a home as prize
- 2 September – Eva, talk show presented by Eva Jinek
- 2 September – NOS Journaal in Makkelijke Taal, the NOS Journaal in simplified language
- 6 September – Café Kockelmann, talk show presented by Sven Kockelmann
- 6 September – Carrie op Vrijdag, show presented by Carrie ten Napel
- 6 September – Dit ben ik, Gordon, reality series centered around Gordon Heuckeroth
- 6 September – Van Roosmalen op Reportage, television show presented by Marcel van Roosmalen
- 9 September – Million Dollar Desert, television show presented by Dennis van der Geest, similar to Million Dollar Island
- 16 September – Wonen onder de zon voor minder dan een ton, television show presented by Leonie ter Braak
- 26 September – Verloren Jongeren, television series about young adults rebuilding their lives after youth care
- 5 October – Ja of Nee?, game show presented by Kalvijn (Kelvin Boerma)
- 11 October – Dolly for President, series about the life of Dolly Parton presented by Ilse de Lange and Frank Evenblij
- 14 October – Charmes in de Strijd, game show presented by Patty Brard
- 26 October – Ons Kent Ons, game show presented by Erik Van Looy
- 28 October – Muscles & Brains, reality game show presented by Jan Versteegh
- 31 October – Onderaan de Streep, panel show presented by Astrid Joosten
- 10 November – Hein, family television series about a boy named Hein
- 10 November – Postcode Loterij: Schat je Rijk, quiz show presented by Humberto Tan
- 11 November – Onderweg naar Liefde, dating television show
- 12 November – Erasmus MC 24/7, reality series about the Erasmus University Medical Center (Erasmus MC)
- 18 November – De Quizmarathon, quiz game show presented by Rob Kamphues
- 19 November – Op de Barricade, show presented by Fidan Ekiz
- 23 November – 3 Minutes of Fame, singing television show presented by Wendy van Dijk
- 2 December – In het Hart van de Zaak, documentary series about crime cases
- 8 December – Kruispunt: De herrijzenis van de Notre Dame, show about the Notre-Dame de Paris presented by Philip Freriks
- 12 December – De Nationale Kerstboom, Christmas show by EO presented by Anne-Mar Zwart
- 17 December – PowNed of View: Allemaal Naar De Kanker?, documentary about vaping presented by Filemon Wesselink, Sarah Bakker and Mark Baanders
- 23 December – Woeste Grond, drama series
- 25 December – Jan Smit viert Kerst in Rome, Christmas special presented by Jan Smit

== Deaths ==
- 23 May – Rudolf Spoor, 85, television director.
- 15 July – Wieteke van Dort, 81, actress and singer, liver cancer.
- 14 August – Eugènie Herlaar, 84, news presenter (NOS Journaal).
- 14 September – Arie van der Veer, 82, televangelist, chairman of Evangelische Omroep, prostate cancer.
- 21 October – Flory Anstadt, 95, programme creator (Kinderen voor Kinderen) and television director.
- 27 October – Hans Kemna, 84, casting director and actor.
- 18 November – Emile Jansen, 64, actor (Winter in Wartime).

== See also ==
- 2024 in the Netherlands
