= MINDF*CK =

- Genre: Magic; Popular science
- Created by: Victor Mids; Oscar Verpoort
- Directed by: Oscar Verpoort
- Presented by: Victor Mids
- Opening theme: "Let Me Go" (Maverick Sabre)
- Country of origin: Netherlands
- Original language: Dutch
- No. of seasons: 7
- No. of episodes: 46; 11 specials

Production
- Production company: OVP

Original release
- Network: NPO 3 (2015–2016); NPO 1 (2017–present); AVROTROS
- Release: 5 January 2015 – present

MINDF*CK is a Dutch television series about magic and popular science. It is presented by Victor Mids. Mids created the series together with Oscar Verpoort, who directs and produces the series with his company OVP.

The first season aired in January 2015 and seven seasons aired since. Additionally, seven New Year's Eve specials, a three-part anniversary special and a Christmas special have aired.

== Format ==
Each episode, presenter Victor Mids performs magic tricks and illusions for civilians as also for a celebrity. Mids claims to never use actors. Each episode also features Mids explaining a trick to the viewers.

Each episode usually features:

- Victor Mids performing magic tricks and illusions for civilians. He often performs themed tricks at certain locations, such as a trick involving woodwork at a hardware store.
- a celebrity, who is invited to experience an illusion.
- a trick being explained. These tricks often involve misleading camera perspectives.
- an experiment tested out by a test panel (from season 3 onwards). Viewers can often participate in these experiments at home.

== Episodes ==
=== Season 1 (2015) ===
The first season was broadcast weekly on Mondays at 21:25 on NPO 3.

| Episode | Special guest | Air date (2015) |
|---|---|---|
| 1 | Frans van Zoest | 5 January |
| 2 | Kim Feenstra | 12 January |
| 3 | Victor Reinier | 19 January |
| 4 | Susan Smit | 26 January |
| 5 | Gerard Ekdom | 2 February |
| 6 | Ben Saunders | 9 February |
| 7 | Lauren Verster | 16 February |
| 8 | Fedde le Grand | 23 February |

=== Season 2 (2016) ===
The second aired weekly on Mondays at 21:20 on NPO 3.

| Episode | Special guest | Air date (2016) |
|---|---|---|
| 1 | Matthijs van Nieuwkerk | 4 January |
| 2 | Ilse DeLange | 11 January |
| 3 | Frans Bauer | 18 January |
| 4 | Ellen Hoog | 25 January |
| 5 | Julius Jaspers | 1 February |
| 6 | John Williams | 8 February |
| 7 | Abbey Hoes | 15 February |
| 8 | Hardwell | 22 February |

=== Season 3 (2017) ===
The third season aired weekly on Saturdays at 20:25 on NPO 1.

| Episode | Special guest | Air date (2017) |
|---|---|---|
| 1 | Wendy van Dijk | 1 April |
| 2 | Mark Rutte | 8 April |
| 3 | Enzo Knol | 15 April |
| 3 | Churandy Martina | 15 April |
| 4 | Miss Montreal | 22 April |
| 5 | Ilja Gort | 29 April |
| 6 | Armin van Buuren | 6 May |

=== Season 4 (2018) ===
The fourth season also aired weekly on Saturdays at 20:25 on NPO 1.

| Episode | Special guest | Air date (2018) |
|---|---|---|
| 1 | André van Duin | 17 March |
| 2 | Jill Schirnhofer | 24 March |
| 2 | René Mioch | 24 March |
| 3 | Rico Verhoeven | 31 March |
| 4 | Ellie Lust | 7 April |
| 5 | Dominic Seldis | 14 April |
| 6 | Chantal Janzen | 21 April |

=== Season 5 (2019) ===
The fifth season was titled MINDF*CK Caribbean. It was filmed on the ABC islands and Suriname.

| Episode | Special guest | Air date (2019) |
|---|---|---|
| 1 | Barry Hay | 19 October |
| 2 | Humberto Tan | 26 October |
| 3 | Shirma Rouse | 2 November |
| 4 | Fajah Lourens | 9 November |
| 5 | Lee Towers | 16 November |
| 6 | Stephanie van Eer | 23 November |

=== Season 6 (2021) ===
The sixth season aired weekly on Saturdays at 20:30 on NPO 1.

| Episode | Special guest(s) | Air date (2021) |
|---|---|---|
| 1 | André Rieu | 30 October |
| 2 | Nikkie de Jager | 6 November |
| 3 | Najib Amhali | 20 November |
| 4 | Maan & Snelle | 27 November |
| 5 | Han Peekel | 4 December |
| 6 | Sunnery James & Ryan Marciano | 11 December |

=== Season 7 (2024) ===
The seventh season aired weekly on Saturdays at 20:30 on NPO 1.

| Episode | Special guest(s) | Air date (2024) |
|---|---|---|
| 1 | Youp van 't Hek | 16 March |
| 2 | StukTV | 23 March |
| 3 | Davina Michelle | 30 March |
| 4 | Jandino Asporaat | 6 April |
| 5 | Paulien Cornelisse | 13 April |
| 6 | Fred van Leer | 20 April |

=== Holiday specials (2016–2025) ===
Multiple New Year's Eve specials and a Christmas special have aired.

- The first special (which aired on New Year's Eve 2016) consisted of an experiment conducted on a civilian, where he experienced teleportation.
- The 2017 New Year's Eve special featured Broederliefde, Eva Jinek and Lieke Martens.
- The 2018 New Year's Eve special was a registration of Mids' live show (which he performed earlier in 2018 in AFAS Live).
- The 2019 New Year's Eve special featured the best scenes and clips from all previous seasons, as voted for by fans.
- The 2021 New Year's Eve special featured Nicolette van Dam and Bas Smit. It was partially filmed at The Upside Down Amsterdam.
- The 2022 New Year's Eve special featured Janny van der Heijden and Robèrt van Beckhoven.
- The 2023 New Year's Eve special featured Philip Freriks & Maarten van Rossem. It was partially filmed at the studio of De slimste mens (of which Freriks and van Rossem were the host and jury, respectively).
- The 2025 Christmas special featured Robert ten Brink.

| Title or special guest(s) | Air date and time |
|---|---|
| Het Teleportatie Experiment ("The Teleportation Experiment") | 31 December 2016 at 21:20 |
| Broederliefde, Eva Jinek & Lieke Martens | 31 December 2017 at 20:20 |
| MINDF*CK Live | 31 December 2018 at 20:30 |
| The Best Of | 31 December 2019 at 20:30 |
| Nicolette van Dam & Bas Smit | 31 December 2021 at 21:40 |
| Janny van der Heijden & Robèrt van Beckhoven | 31 December 2022 at 21:30 |
| Philip Freriks & Maarten van Rossem | 31 December 2023 at 20:25 |
| Robert ten Brink | 27 December 2025 at 20:30 |

=== Anniversary specials (2025) ===
In celebration of its ten-year anniversary, three special episodes aired where special guests from previous seasons were interviewed and parts of their episodes were shown. The specials aired weekly on Saturdays at 19:00 on NPO 1.

| Episode | Special guests | Air date (2025) |
|---|---|---|
| 1 | Frans van Zoest & Humberto Tan | 8 February |
| 2 | Nikkie de Jager & Armin van Buuren | 15 February |
| 3 | André van Duin & Stephanie van Eer | 22 February |
