= 2024 in television =

2024 in television may refer to

- 2024 in American television for television-related events in the United States.
  - List of 2024 American television debuts for television debut related events in the United States.
- 2024 in Australian television for television-related events in Australia.
- 2024 in British television for television-related events in the United Kingdom.
  - 2024 in Scottish television for television-related events in Scotland.
- 2024 in Canadian television for television-related events in Canada.
- 2024 in Croatian television for television-related events in Croatia.
- 2024 in Dutch television for television-related events in the Netherlands.
- 2024 in Irish television for television-related events in the Republic of Ireland.
- 2024 in Japanese television for television-related events in Japan.
- 2024 in Philippine television for television-related events in the Philippines.
- 2024 in Portuguese television for television-related events in Portugal.
- 2024 in South Korean television for television-related events in South Korea.
- 2024 in Spanish television for television-related events in Spain.
- 2024 in Tamil television for television-related events in the Tamil language.
