= Elmer (rapper) =

Dutch rapper and producer (born 1995)

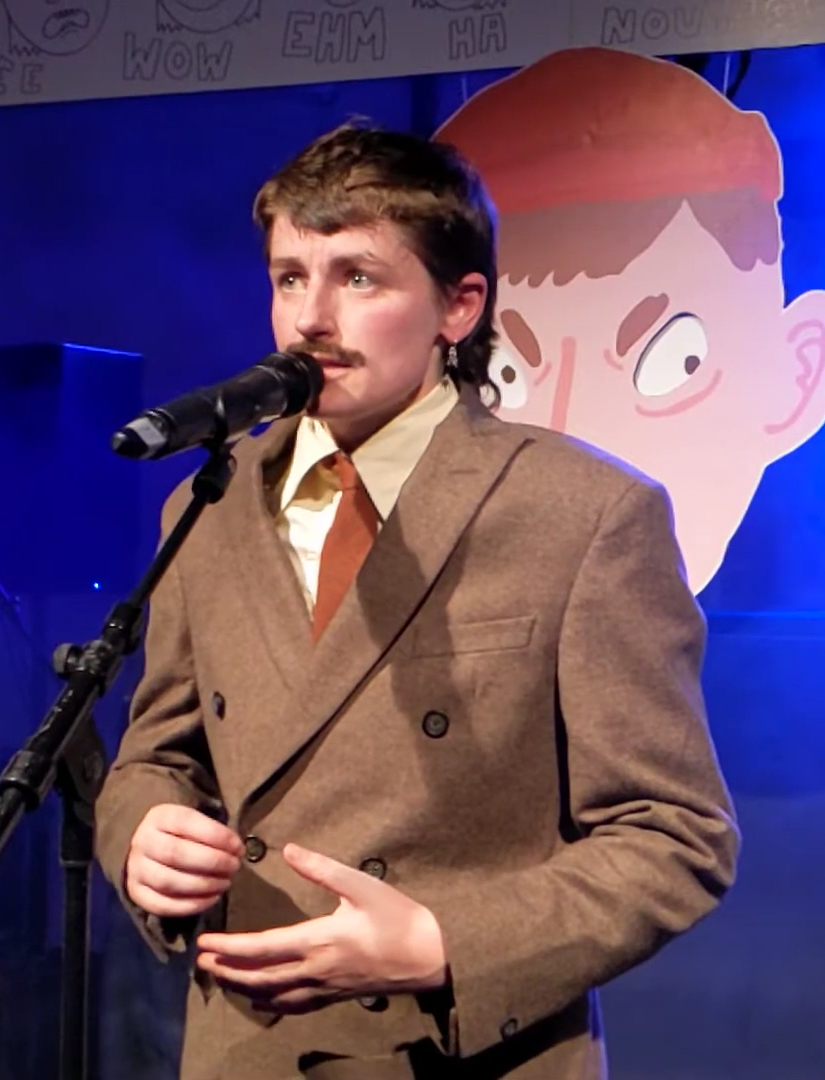
- Elmer performing at De Sering, Amsterdam

Background information
- Born: Merel Pauw; 13 March 1995 (age 31); Amsterdam, Netherlands
- Genres: Hip hop; Nederhop; Hip house
- Years active: 2021–present
- Website: https://www.elmermuziek.nl

Merel Pauw (Amsterdam, 13 March 1995), known professionally as Elmer, is a Dutch rapper, musician, producer, and actor, who performs in Dutch. Pauw launched her musical career in 2021 when she released the single "Je vader" (Your Father). Since then she has performed at large Dutch and Belgian festivals such as Lowlands en Pukkelpop, toured in support of Merol, and participated in the popular Dutch quiz show De Slimste Mens.

== Early life and education ==
Merel Pauw is the daughter of comedian George van Houts and actor Leonoor Pauw. She was born and grew up with her sister in Amsterdam. In 2013, she lost her mother to cancer; the song "Fantastisch" (Fantastic), released in 2023, is dedicated to this. In her teenage years, she decided to legally adopt her mother's last name. In high school, she played the bass guitar in a band.

As a child, Pauw played a small role in the Paul Verhoeven film Black Book. In 2018, she completed her studies at the ArtEZ School of Acting in Arnhem, where she also resided for a while. During these studies, she founded the theatre group and hip hop collective Dieheleding with Steven Ivo en Jip Vuik. As a theatre actor, she also performs in several other groups, with Theater Utrecht, HNTjong, and Theater Oostpool among them.

== Career ==
=== Ekster ===
During the first lockdown as a result of the COVID-19 pandemic, Pauw finished her debut extended play in her home studio using Logic Pro. She was inspired to make the first single, "Je vader" (Your Father), by the Miami bass genre; she calls "a very dirty line that keeps repeating itself" key to the style, with that line in this case being "ik neuk je vader zonder condoom" (I fuck your father without a condom). According to Pauw, the song is not a political statement, and was mostly written as a joke. After the song went moderately viral online in the Netherlands, this first EP, entitled Ekster (Magpie), was released on 24 June 2022. It also contains the singles "Laveloos" (Passed Out) and "Over toeren" (Upset). Musician and visual artist Tessa Rose Jackson (Someone) served as her vocal coach.

In October of that year, Elmer released a double single consisting of "Druk" (Busy or Pressure, also a play on Suppress) and "Suzan & Freek" (a reference to the Dutch musical duo). These two songs were produced by Dieheleding member Steven Ivo, who has been responsible for the production of all her songs since then. Pauw says that although she is very proud of Ekster, which she created alone, she far prefers to make music collaboratively.

=== Nothing ontploffing ===
Starting in late 2022, Elmer toured with her Nothing ontploffing (Nothing Explosion) project. The first single from this EP, "Sorry", was released on 10 February 2023. In the song, Elmer addresses the tendency of women to apologise without good reason and ignore their own needs under societal pressure. The complete EP followed a month later, and also contained the single "Lager" (Lower).

Elmer, along with Babs and Suzooki Swift, supported Merol on her 2023 Dutch club tour. This brought her to several well-known venues, like Muziekgieterij in Maastricht and Luxor Live in Arnhem. In June 2023, she won the Zonneprijs, a prize awarded to promising new artists by Paradiso's indie music platform Indiestad.

=== Elmers ===
In summer 2023, Pauw turned her social media profiles into an art project in which she showcased the three different people she says she embodies at different times. Several videos were published, using a combination of live action filmography and animation. In these she is joined by a puppet, the ‘DJ dog’ Skipper, who has since accompanied her on stage. The music videos for "Ik weiger" (I Refuse) and "Fantastisch" (Fantastic) were also created in this style. The project is in support of the EP Elmers, which will be released later in 2023.

On 18 August 2023, Elmer performed at both Lowlands and Pukkelpop, as a last-minute replacement for Alewya and Siegfried & Joy, respectively. Both shows were praised by the Belgian and Dutch music press.

==== Participation in De Slimste Mens ====
Following the participation of her father, who won the 2016 summer season, Pauw was a candidate in the 2023 summer season of the popular Dutch television quiz De Slimste Mens. In her debut episode, she narrowly lost the final to Volkskrant Magazine editor-in-chief Aimée Kiene and immediately left the game as a result.

Her participation led to a column by television critic and former participant Angela de Jong in the AD newspaper. De Jong criticised Pauw's decision to enter as her alter ego, and specifically pointed to the fake moustache she was wearing. She asked herself what effect seeing someone like Elmer on television would have on young girls. In a radio interview the next day, Pauw accused her of being a TERF and called her comments "disgusting". NRC columnist Frank Huiskamp was also critical of De Jong's comments.

== Personal life ==
Pauw is bisexual and identifies as a woman, but says she is fine with the use of any pronouns to refer to her. She states in interviews with Dutch newspapers de Volkskrant en Het Parool that she may have identified as non-binary if it and similar labels had been more present during her youth. Her Elmer stage persona (wearing a suit and a fake moustache) is an expression of her view of gender as "a performance, a role". She is in a relationship with fellow theatre actor Menzo Kircz.

== Discography ==
=== Albums ===
- MAN, OH MAN (2026) – producer: Keenan Mundane
- Platland (2024) – producer: Steven Ivo

=== EPs ===
- Ekster (2022) – producer: Elmer
- Nothing ontploffing (2023) – producer: Steven Ivo
- Elmers (2023) – producer: Steven Ivo

=== Singles ===
- "Druk" / "Suzan & Freek" (2022) – producer: Steven Ivo
