= De Grote Sinterklaasfilm en de Strijd om Pakjesavond =

2023 Dutch film directed by Lucio Messercola

- Film poster
- Directed by: Lucio Messercola
- Release date: 4 October 2023 (Netherlands)
- Country: Netherlands
- Language: Dutch

De Grote Sinterklaasfilm en de Strijd om Pakjesavond is a 2023 Dutch film directed by Lucio Messercola. The film won the Golden Film award after having sold 100,000 tickets.

Robert ten Brink and Martien Meiland play roles in the film. Eva Jinek, René Froger and Hans Klok also play a role in the film. Principal photography took place in summer 2023 in the Netherlands. The film became the sixth best visited Dutch film of 2023 with just over 220.000 visitors.
