= Lambula vanrossemi =

Scientific classification
- Kingdom: Animalia
- Phylum: Arthropoda
- Class: Insecta
- Order: Lepidoptera
- Superfamily: Noctuoidea
- Family: Erebidae
- Subfamily: Arctiinae
- Genus: Lambula
- Species: L. vanrossemi

Binomial name
- Lambula vanrossemi (De Vos, 2019)

Species of moth

Lambula vanrossemi is a moth of the family Erebidae. It was described by Rob de Vos in 2019.

It is found in the Arfak Mountains, West Papua, Indonesia, where it is endemic. It seems to be a common species. The holotype was a male described from the village of Mokwam. In 2020 the female of the species was also described from a group of moths captured at the same time as the males. The species shows sexual dimorphism, with the wing patterns and colour differing. The forewing length of the female individuals captured varied between 9.3 and 10.8 mm (0.37 and 0.43 in).

The species might be threatened due to its local distribution where logging and other habitat destruction takes place.

According to the species description it was named for Maarten van Rossem. Van Rossem however states that it could also be named for his father, the entomologist Gerard van Rossem, since only the last name is included in the species name.
