= Angela de Jong =

Dutch journalist, television critic and columnist

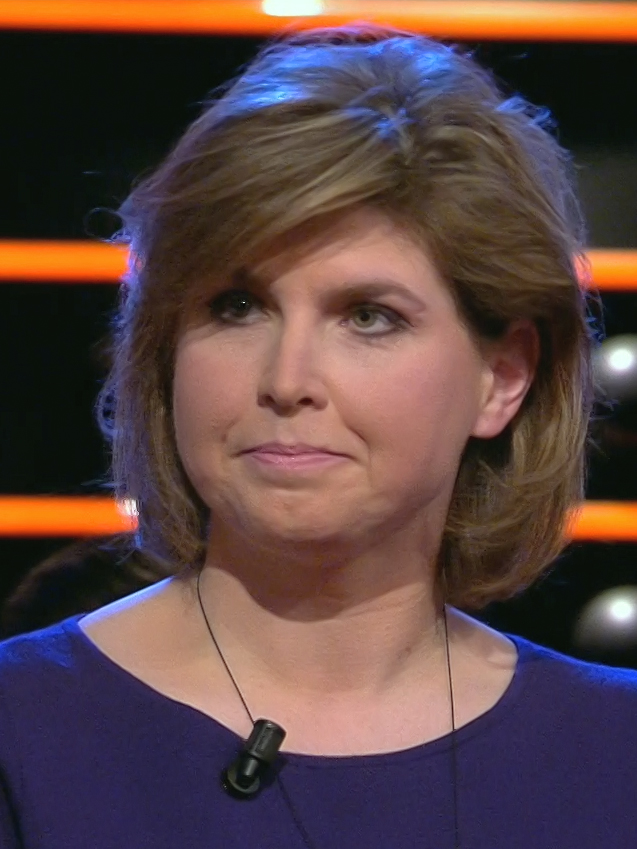
- Angela de Jong in 2018
- Born: 27 February 1976 (age 50); Gouda, Netherlands
- Occupations: Journalist, television critic

Angela de Jong (born 27 February 1976) is a Dutch journalist, television critic and columnist. She is known for her columns for the newspaper Algemeen Dagblad.

== Career ==
De Jong studied Literature, Film and Television Cultures at the Utrecht University, and studied journalism at the Erasmus University Rotterdam. She then went on to be correspondent for a local newspaper, Rotterdams Dagblad. De Jong has worked for her current employer, Algemeen Dagblad (AD), since 2005. In 2010, she started as a television critic, writing columns about current television affairs for that newspaper. She is often invited to talkshows, such as De Wereld Draait Door, Jinek, and RTL Boulevard.

In the summer of 2017, De Jong was a participant in the quiz show De Slimste Mens. She placed first, and went on to win in the final episode, making her the first female winner since the show moved to the channel NPO 2. She appeared in a 2018 episode of the television show Dit was het nieuws. In 2019, she was named 'Most influential woman in media' by feminist monthly magazine, Opzij. In the same year, she also appeared in the DeMedia100, a list of most influential people in Dutch media.

In 2024, she published her columns for AD in a book titled Angela kijkt tv. In the same year, she performed as drag queen Ivana Say Something in the drag queen show Make Up Your Mind. As of June 2025, she is scheduled to write columns for Algemeen Dagblad about a broader range of topics rather than only television, starting in September 2025.

De Jong was a jury member for multiple editions of the Ere Zilveren Nipkowschijf, an award given to people or shows that have made a contribution to Dutch television. She was also a jury member for multiple editions of the Media Oeuvre Award (2022, 2023, 2024 and 2025). De Jong was a jury member for the 2023 Sonja Barend Award.

== Personal life ==
De Jong grew up in Ouderkerk aan den IJssel.
