= Chiel Montagne =

Dutch television presenter and radio DJ (1944–2025)

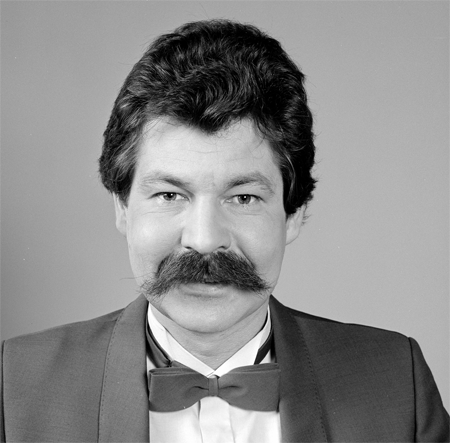
Montagne in 1984

Bert van Rheenen (26 August 1944 – 24 July 2025), better known as Chiel Montagne, was a Dutch television presenter and radio DJ.

== Biography ==
Van Rheenen was born in Uitgeest on 26 August 1944. His career started in 1963 under the pseudonym Chiel Montagne as a disc jockey at the offshore radio station Radio Veronica. In 1971, Montagne started presenting the television program "Op losse groeven" (later "Op Volle Toeren") at the TROS. This was a program entirely dedicated to Dutch music, that ran for almost twenty years. In the beginning, Montagne was also part of the famous TROS DJ team that from Thursday 3 October 1974, took care of the airtime expansion as an A-broadcaster on Hilversum 3 and from 3 October 1974 to 28 November 1985, would grow into the famous TROS Thursday; The best day on 3, the best listened to day on Hilversum 3. In 1972, he tried to score a hit with the song "Marja" which appeared in the Tipparade.

Montagne was also involved in the production and direction of music specials. In 1974, he also founded his own sound studio in Baarn, Dutch Music Center (DMC), where many Dutch artists and international artists have recorded their records. On 15 December 2003, he founded his own broadcaster, the Montagne Omroep Nederland (MON). His goal with this broadcaster was to broadcast more Dutch music. However, the broadcaster did not reach the required number of members and never broadcast. Montagne was one of the co-founders of Holland FM. He had also been involved in sponsorship for Talk Radio for some time.

On 29 April 2010, Montagne was made a Knight of the Order of Orange-Nassau in his hometown of Hilversum.

Montagne died of chronic obstructive pulmonary disease on 24 July 2025, aged 80.
