= Emma Wortelboer =

Dutch television presenter (born 1996)

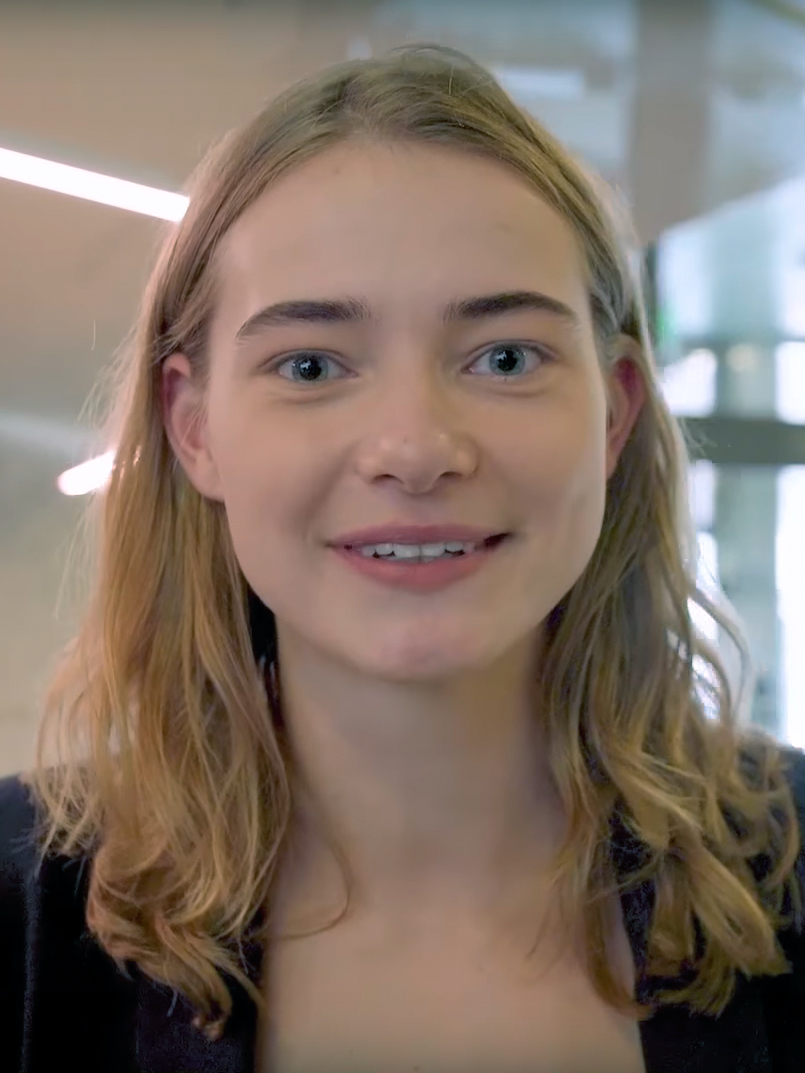
Emma Wortelboer in 2018

Emma Wortelboer (born 26 October 1996 in Deventer) is a Dutch television presenter who has worked for BNNVARA since 2015. She grew up in Manderveen and went to school at Het Erasmus in Almelo. Wortelboer was the Dutch spokesperson for the Eurovision Song Contest 2019. Her expressive reaction to the Dutch victory at the contest went viral.

== Work ==
- Spuiten en Slikken (BNN, 2016-2018)
- 3 op Reis Midweek (BNNVARA, 2017)
- Club Hub (NPO 3, 2017–present)
- Spuiten en Slikken Sekstest 2018 (BNNVARA)
- De Wereld Draait Door (YUNG DWDD) (2018–2020)
- Emma's Peepshow (2018–present)
- Wortelboer en Van Rossem (2023–present)
