= André Landzaat =

Dutch-American actor (1944–2025)

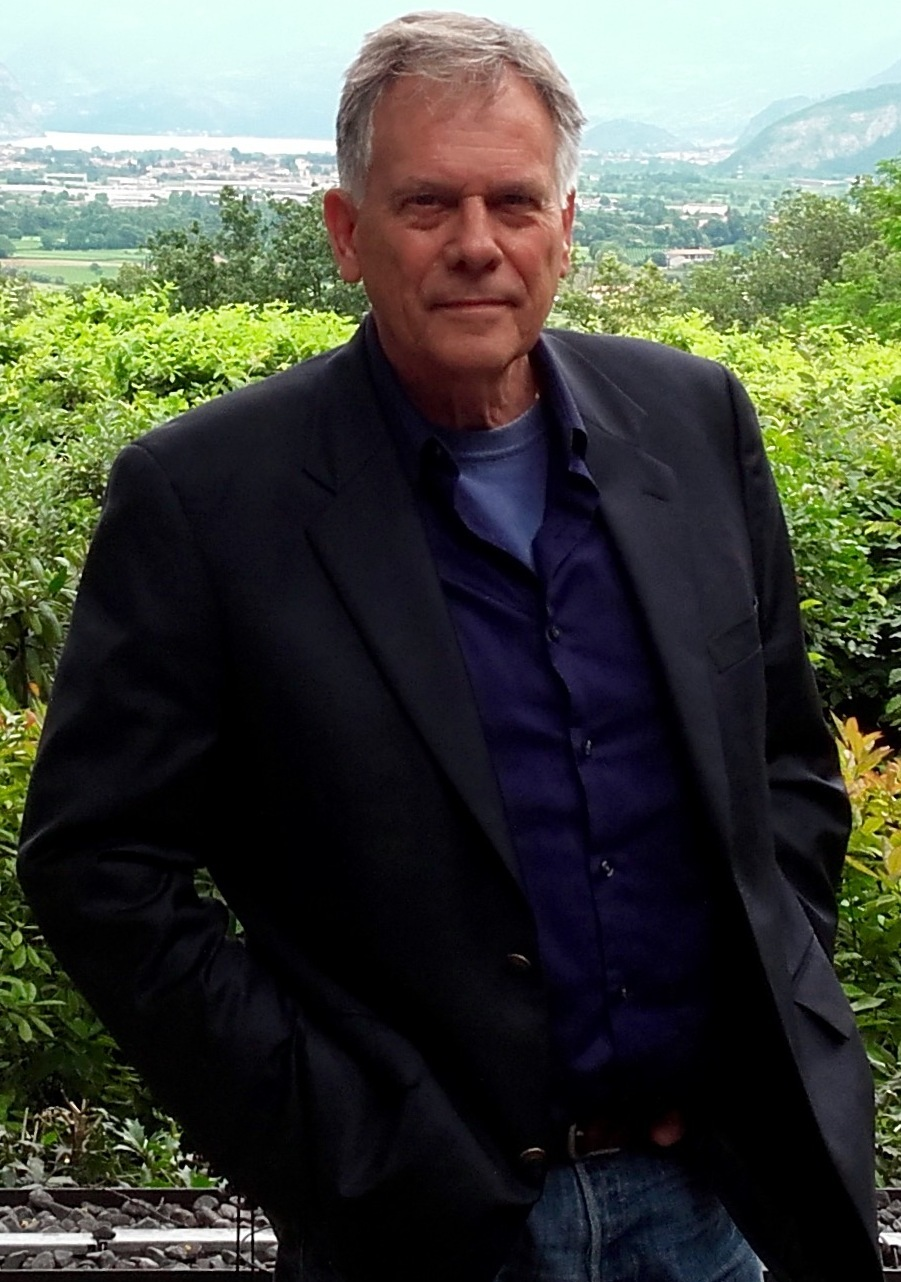
- Landzaat in 2018
- Born: 7 April 1944; The Hague, German-occupied Netherlands
- Died: 21 September 2025 (aged 81)
- Occupation: Actor
- Years active: 1967–2024
- Partner: Ed Lesemann

André Landzaat (7 April 1944 – 21 September 2025) was a Dutch-American film and television actor. He was best known for playing Tony Cassadine in the American soap opera television series General Hospital in 1981.

== Early life and career ==
Landzaat was born in The Hague on 7 April 1944, the son of Frederika Landzaat. At an early age, he emigrated to France, settling in Paris, where he studied acting with Yves Furet. After studying with Furet, he began his screen career in 1967, appearing in the television series When Freedom Came from Heaven, which after his career began, he then emigrated to the United States, settling in New York, where he studied acting with Lee Strasberg.

Landzaat guest-starred in television programs including The Six Million Dollar Man, Family, Laverne & Shirley, All That Glitters and The Yellow Rose. In addition to his guest-appearances, he portrayed Tony Cassadine on General Hospital in 1981, and Rudolf Stikker on Medisch Centrum West from 1989 to 1990.

Landzaat retired from acting in 2024, last appearing in the film Ties.

== Personal life and death ==
Landzaat lived in Malibu, California with his partner Ed Lesemann. Their relationship lasted until Landzaat's death in 2025.

Landzaat died on 21 September 2025, at the age of 81.
