= Philip Freriks =

Dutch television presenter (born 1944)

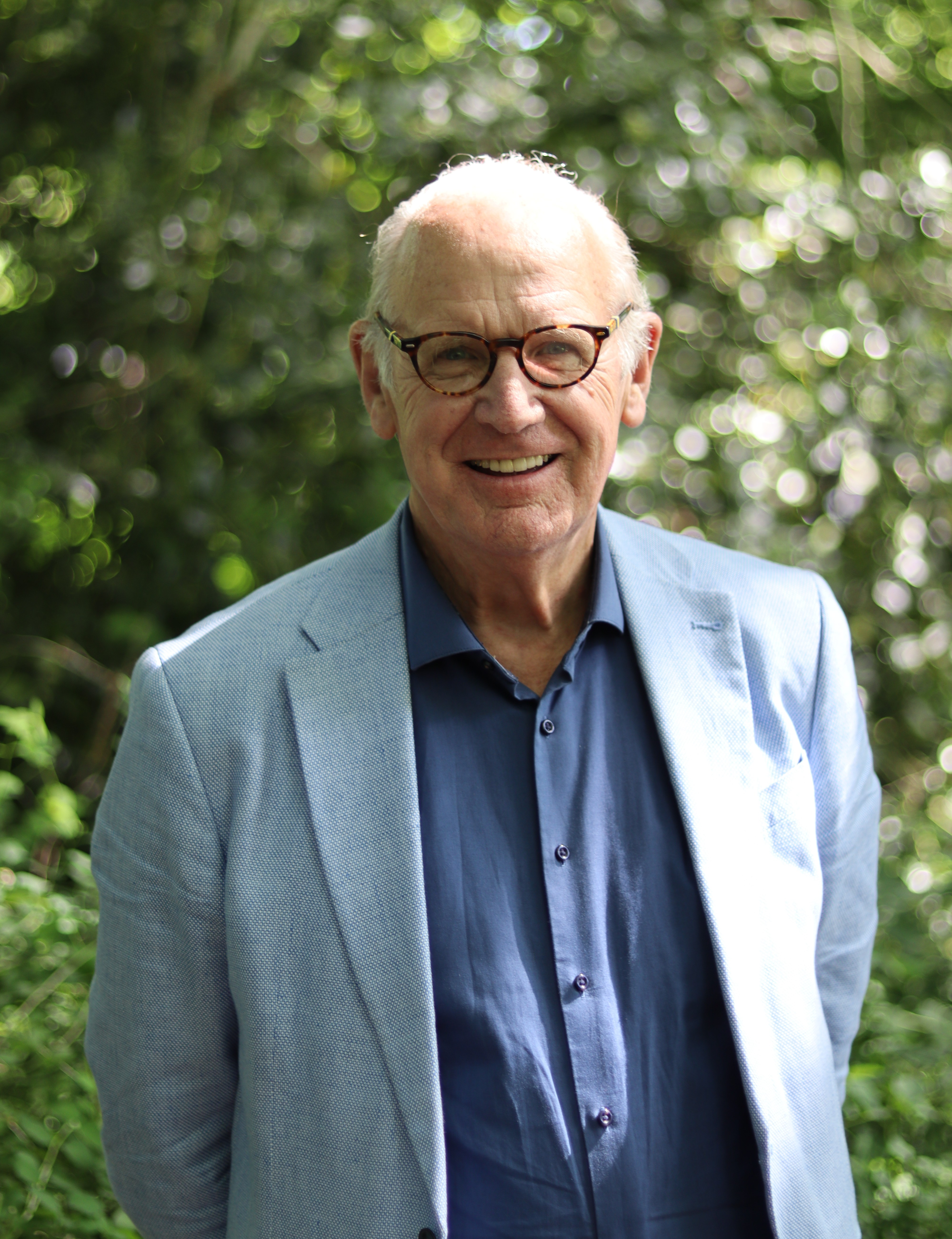
- Freriks in 2025
- Born: Philip Johan Freriks; 27 July 1944 (age 82); Utrecht, Netherlands
- Occupations: Journalist; Television presenter
- Known for: NOS Journaal; De slimste mens; Groot Dictee der Nederlandse Taal

Philip Johan Freriks (born 27 July 1944) is a Dutch journalist, columnist and television presenter. He is known as newsreader of the NOS Journaal from 1996 until 2009. He presented multiple television shows, including the quiz show De slimste mens and the spelling test Groot Dictee der Nederlandse Taal.

== Career ==
At a young age, Freriks worked for the newspaper Nieuw Utrechts Dagblad, the Utrecht edition of Het Parool. He studied at the Hogere Burgerschool (HBS) in Utrecht and he studied political science in Paris, France. Freriks moved to Paris in 1965. Between 1971 and 1993, he worked as correspondent in France for several media outlets, including Het Parool, De Volkskrant and NOS. He also worked as correspondent in the Netherlands for the French newspaper Le Monde.

He is known for presenting the NOS Journaal from 1996 until 2009. Charles Groenhuijsen was planned to be his successor at the NOS Journaal in 2006 but Groenhuijsen was fired after a conflict with NOS. Rob Trip became his successor in January 2010.

Freriks also presented the Groot Dictee der Nederlandse Taal, a televised spelling test for adults, from 1990 until 2016. Since 2018, the event is held via radio. Freriks dictated the text of the 2018 edition and Frits Spits presented the show. Since 2019, retired politician Gerdi Verbeet dictates the text of the Groot Dictee der Nederlandse Taal. Freriks and Mieke van der Weij presented the 2004 quiz show De Grote Bijbelquiz with questions about the Bible.

In 2008, Freriks presented the segment Le Tour de Fifi as part of De Avondetappe, a television show about the Tour de France presented by Mart Smeets. In the same year, Philip Freriks, Eelco Bosch van Rosenthal and Eva Jinek presented the show NOS Amerika Kiest ('NOS America Chooses') from Washington about the United States presidential election. He was the narrator in the 2012 edition of The Passion, a Dutch Passion Play held every Maundy Thursday since 2011. In 2014, Freriks and weather reporter Erwin Kroll presented Lekker Weertje, a six-part series about the weather and the influence it has on society. They presented a second season of the show in 2015. He presented the 2018 television show Een Hollander in Parijs which looks at six 19th-century Dutch painters living and working in Paris.

Freriks presented multiple television series about historic events or time periods. In 2021, he presented the six-part television series In de voetsporen van de wederopbouw which looks at rebuilding the Netherlands from 1945 onwards after World War II. He presented In de voetsporen van D-Day (2019), about the Normandy landings (D-Day), and In de voetsporen van de bevrijding (2020) about the liberation of the Netherlands at the end of World War II. Freriks also presented In de voetsporen van de jaren 60 (2023), about the 1960s, In de voetsporen van de jaren 70 (2024), about the 1970s, and In de voetsporen van de jaren 80 (2025), about the 1980s.

Freriks is known as presenter of the television quiz show De slimste mens. He first presented the show in 2012. In September 2023, he announced that he would stop presenting the quiz show in 2025. In December 2024, he was decorated Officer in the Order of Orange-Nassau on the day of filming his last episode of De slimste mens. He received the award from mayor of Hilversum Gerhard van den Top. The last episode of the show with Philip Freriks as presenter and Maarten van Rossem as jury member aired in January 2025. Herman van der Zandt succeeds him as presenter of the show. Van der Zandt was also a contestant and he won the 24th season of the show. Author and cabaret performer Paulien Cornelisse succeeds Maarten van Rossem as jury member.

Freriks appears in the 2024 film Opa Cor. He provided the Dutch voice for the character Nitwit in the 2025 film A Minecraft Movie directed by Jared Hess. On 4 May 2025, Freriks held the 4 mei-voordracht in the Nieuwe Kerk, Amsterdam as part of the Remembrance of the Dead events and ceremonies. In June 2025, he presented Oorlogsalbums, a two-part television series about photo albums of unknown soldiers. He also presented a second season of Oorlogsalbums in 2026. Freriks and Maarten van Rossem present the 2026 travel television show Maarten & Philip op het spoor door Europa in which they travel through Europe by train.

== Personal life ==
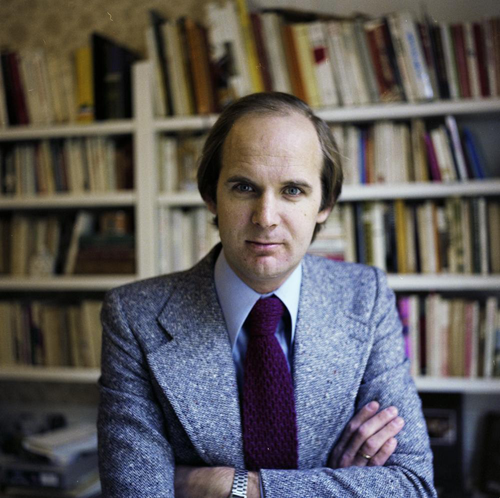
Freriks in 1977.

His brother Jan was killed at a young age on 14 April 1945 during the Battle of Groningen. He published the book Jantje about his brother. Freriks is married and lives with his wife in France. They have a son.

== Selected filmography ==
=== As presenter ===
- Groot Dictee der Nederlandse Taal (1990–2016)
- NOS Journaal (1996–2009)
- De Grote Bijbelquiz (2004)
- De Avondetappe (2008, Le Tour de Fifi)
- De slimste mens (2012–2025)
- Lekker Weertje (2014, 2015)
- Een Hollander in Parijs (2018)
- In de voetsporen van D-Day (2019)
- In de voetsporen van de bevrijding (2020)
- In de voetsporen van de wederopbouw (2021)
- In de voetsporen van de jaren 60 (2023)
- In de voetsporen van de jaren 70 (2024)
- Oorlogsalbums (2025 – 2026)
- In de voetsporen van de jaren 80 (2025)
- Maarten & Philip op het spoor door Europa (2026)

=== As actor ===
- Opa Cor (2024)

=== As voice actor ===
- A Minecraft Movie (2025)

=== As himself ===
- MINDF*CK (2023)
