= Nico de Haan =

Dutch conservationist and writer (1947–2026)

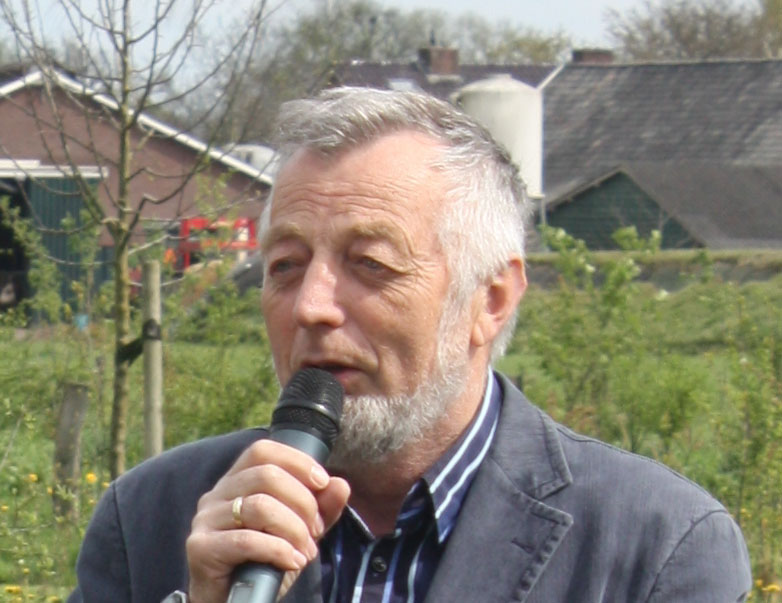
Nico de Haan in 2012

Nico de Haan (22 July 1947 – 7 February 2026) was a Dutch conservationist, writer, and radio and television presenter who was known for popularising birdwatching in the Netherlands. He was known for his work with Vogelbescherming Nederland and his efforts to popularize birdwatching in the Netherlands through the broadcasting programs Vroege Vogels and Baardmannetjes.

== Early life and education ==
De Haan was born on 22 July 1947 in Aarlanderveen in the province of South Holland. He spent much of his childhood in Zalk, a village on the west bank of the river IJssel, where his father served as a minister within the Dutch Reformed tradition.

He completed vocational and higher professional training in land and nature management, attending the Middelbare Landbouwschool in Zwolle and the Bosbouw and Cultuurtechnische School in Arnhem. Prior to establishing his career in the Netherlands, he worked briefly as a miner in Canada.

== Career ==
De Haan began his career in the early 1970s in nature management with Vereniging Natuurmonumenten and later served as manager of the Nieuwkoopse Plassen. In 1974, he joined Vogelbescherming Nederland as a management assistant. During his tenure, which ended in 2004, the organization's membership increased from approximately 8,000 to more than 100,000. After leaving the organization, he remained affiliated as an ambassador.

In 1978, De Haan joined the nature programme Vroege Vogels, presenting instructional segments on bird identification. He later developed the Vroege Vogelzang bird song course, which sold 30,000 copies and received gold certification in 2011. In the 2010s, he co-presented the television series Baardmannetjes with Hans Dorrestijn.

As an author, De Haan published several field guides, including the children's book Vogelontdekgids and the autobiographical work Koekoeksjong in Zalk.

== Death ==
De Haan died on 7 February 2026, at the age of 78.
