= Grand Dictation of the Dutch Language =

Dutch-language televised spelling test

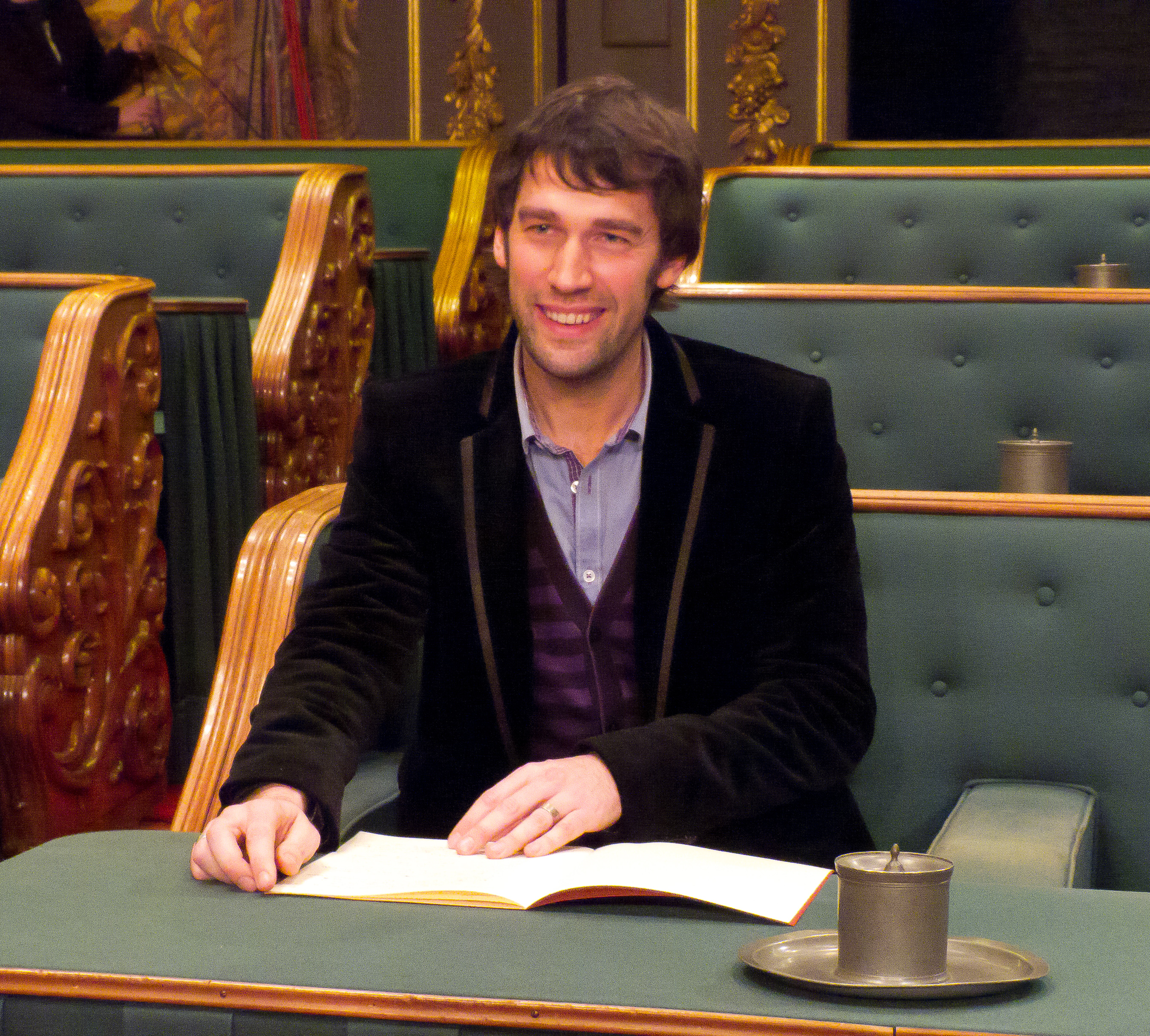
Braeckman during the Grand Dictation in 2011.

The Grand Dictation of the Dutch Language (Dutch: Groot Dictee der Nederlandse Taal) was a televised spelling test for adults organized by the Belgian newspaper De Morgen, the Dutch newspaper de Volkskrant and the Dutch public broadcaster NTR. In May 2017 it was announced no more dictations would be held due to the number of viewers strongly receding.

From its first edition in 1990 through its final one in 2016, the Grand Dictation was held annually in December. Starting 1991, it was televised on Dutch and Dutch-language Belgian television VRT. The Dictation was presented and read by Dutch former anchorman Philip Freriks. Since 2005 Freriks presented jointly with Belgian anchorwoman Martine Tanghe, except in 2011 when Tanghe was recovering from breast cancer.

The dictation took place in the plenary hall of the First Chamber in The Hague. Each year there were about sixty participants: forty from the Netherlands and twenty from Belgium. Half of each group consisted of invited prominent figures and half of members of the public, selected from a qualifying round in De Morgen and de Volkskrant.

From 2004 onwards, the text of the Dictation was written by prominent writers, including Jan Mulder and Remco Campert (2004), Herman Koch (2005), Martin Bril (2006), Jan Wolkers (2007), Kristien Hemmerechts (2008), Gerrit Komrij (2009), Tommy Wieringa (2010), Arnon Grunberg (2011) and Adriaan van Dis (2012).

The spelling rules adhered to were those of what is popularly known as the Green Booklet. For words not mentioned in the Green Booklet, the Van Dale dictionary applied.

Out of the first 23 shows, fourteen were won by Flemish and eleven by Dutch contestants. Once, in 2011, first place was shared between a Dutch and a Belgian contestant. The Belgian newscaster Freek Braeckman is the only invited prominent figure to have won. In 2011 the Walloon journalist Christophe Deborsu was the first French-speaking participant.

The 2015 and 2016 editions used a modified format: participants teamed up in pairs of one prominent and one non-prominent. In 2015 the Dutch team won, in 2016 the Flemish team.
