= Jan Lenferink =

Dutch presenter and columnist (1945–2026)

Jan Lenferink (9 December 1945 – 6 March 2026) was a Dutch radio and television presenter and columnist. He was best known as the presenter of RUR (Rechtstreeks uit Richter), a late-night talk show that began on Veronica in 1983 and later returned on RTL 4, RTL 5 and SBS6.

== Early life and education ==
Lenferink was born in Dalfsen on 9 December 1945. He studied Dutch language and psychology at the Katholieke Universiteit Nijmegen, served for three years as editor-in-chief of the Nijmeegse Universiteitsblad, and later worked for several years as a teacher of Dutch.

== Career ==
In the 1970s, Lenferink worked as a presenter and editor on the radio programme Dit is het begin and later moved to the VPRO. His first television work came as an interviewer on Het Gat van Nederland in the 1973–74 season. His best known programme was RUR, which he developed with Gert-Jan Dröge. The format began in 1982 as a Sunday-afternoon talk show in the Amsterdam nightclub Richter before becoming a national television programme on Veronica in October 1983. The programme became known for Lenferink's striped shirt, glass of milk, and direct, lightly ironic interview style, as well as for conversations about art, culture, science, sex and drugs. After its original run ended in 1992, the format later reappeared on RTL4, RTL5 and SBS6. In 2002, Lenferink briefly returned with a revived RUR and the daily talk show Louter Lenferink.

Beyond RUR, Lenferink presented the Veronica programme Jan achter de schermen van in 1990. He also wrote columns for NRC Handelsblad, Het Parool and Haagse Post.

== Death ==
Lenferink died on 6 March 2026, at the age of 80.
