= Ellie Lust =

Dutch television presenter (born 1966)

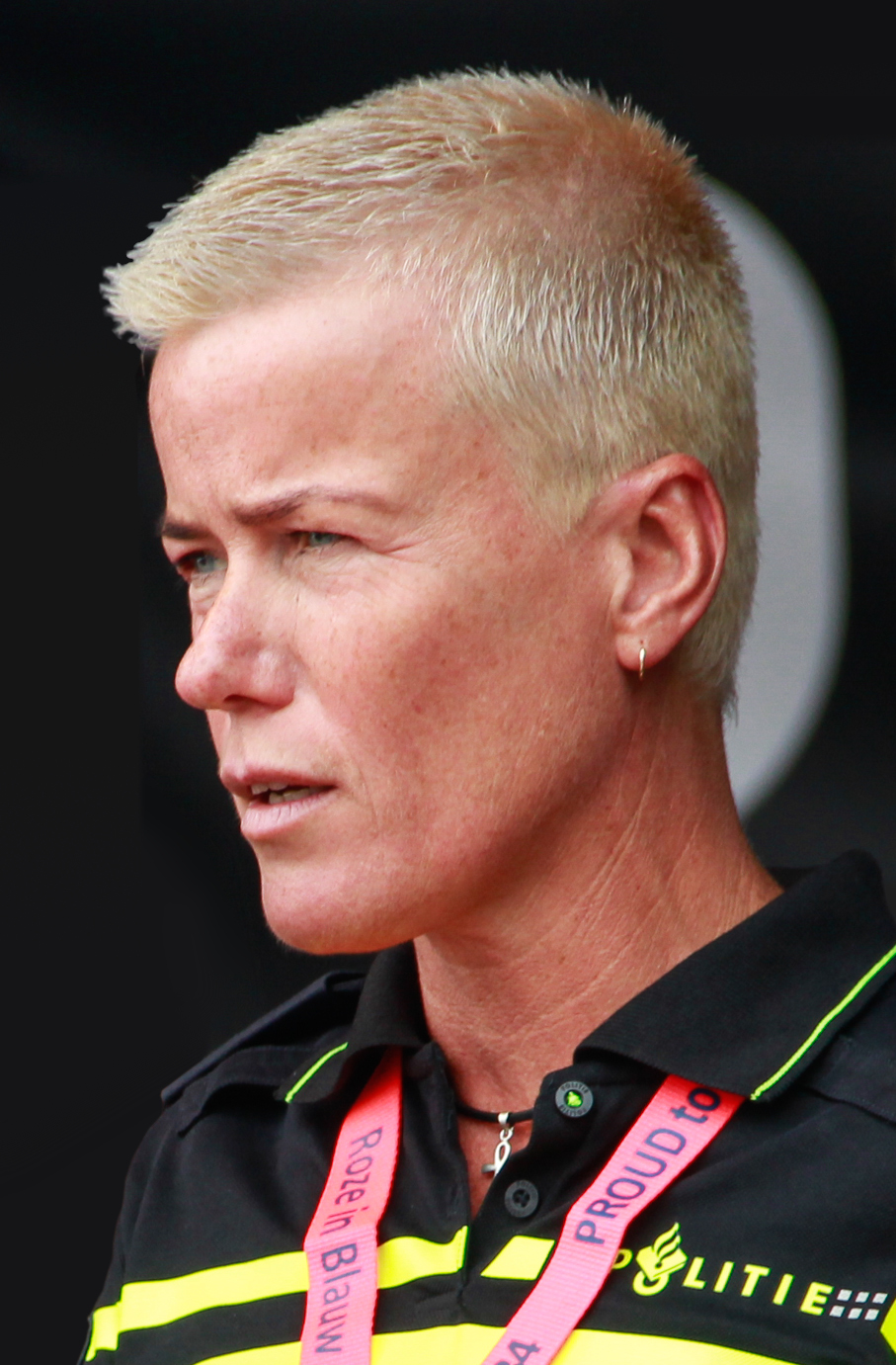
- Ellie Lust in 2015
- Born: 17 September 1966 (age 60); Amsterdam, Netherlands
- Occupations: Television presenter, police officer and police spokesperson

Ellie Lust (born 17 September 1966) is a Dutch television presenter and former police officer and police spokesperson.

== Career ==
Lust presented three seasons of the television show Ellie op Patrouille in which she followed police forces in various countries. She also presented Ellie in de Handel which focused on illegal trade. She also appeared as police officer in the crime television show Opsporing Verzocht. In the summer of 2019, she interviewed guests as co-presenter in several episodes of the talk show Zomer met Art presented by Art Rooijakkers. In 2019, she also made the documentary Ellie aan de Verkeerde Kant, a documentary about hostile behavior against LGBT people and she reported the Pride Amsterdam live on television.

In 2016, Lust participated in the popular television show Wie is de Mol?. Both in later seasons of the show and in several appearances outside this show, she has become known for introducing the word etherdiscipline, which expresses the importance of clear communication when using walkie-talkies (which are regularly used in Wie is de Mol?). It has since also been used to refer to clear communication in general. In 2020, she appeared in a special anniversary edition of the show, called Wie is de Mol? Renaissance, which featured only contestants of previous seasons.

In 2021, Lust presented the television show Opgelicht? Hulp Online met Ellie Lust in which she looked at online fraud. She also appears in the television show 112 Vandaag which looks at interesting calls to the emergency phone number 112.

Lust appears in the film BOEIEN! directed by Bob Wilbers. In 2024, she won the Groot Dictee der Nederlandse Taal in the category Dutch celebrities. In 2025, she presents the television show Opgelicht in de Liefde about romance scams. She also appeared in an episode of the 2025 anniversary season of the television show Wie is de Mol?.

She appeared in several episodes of the late night talk shows Laat op één, Pauw and Jinek.

== Personal life ==
She has a twin sister. She also has a brother.

== Filmography ==
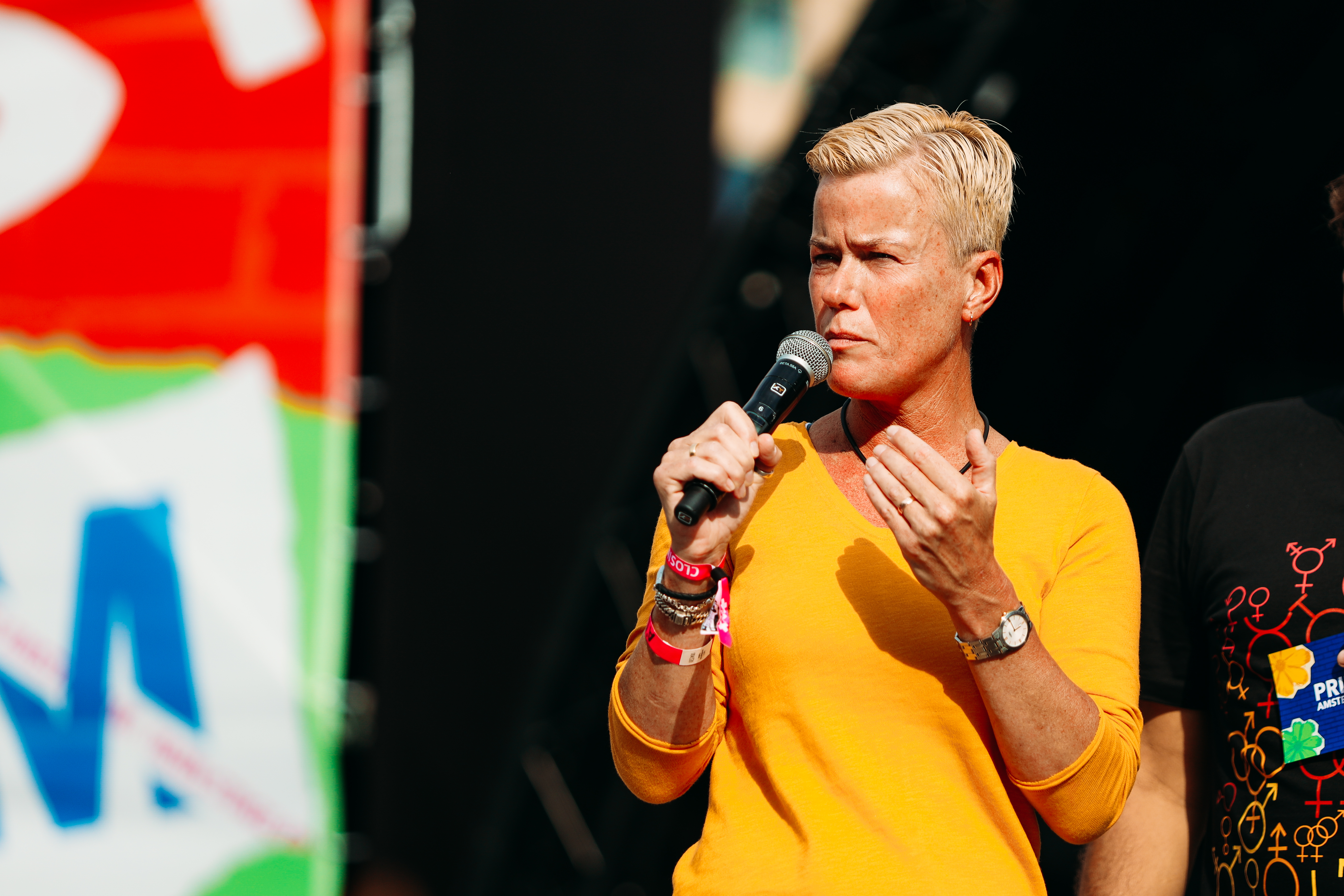
Lust at Pride Amsterdam 2019.

=== As presenter ===
- 2018 – 2020: Ellie op Patrouille
- 2019: Zomer met Art
- 2019: Ellie in de Handel
- 2021: Opgelicht? Hulp Online met Ellie Lust
- 2021: 112 Vandaag (as expert)
- 2025 – present: Opgelicht in de Liefde

=== As actress ===
- 2022: BOEIEN!

=== As contestant ===
- 2016: Wie is de Mol?
- 2020: Wie is de Mol? Renaissance (anniversary season)
- 2021: Het Jachtseizoen

=== As herself ===
- 2018: MINDF*CK
- 2026: Casa di Beau

== Books ==
- Ellie Lust, Mijn jaren bij de politie, Ambo/Anthos B.V., 2019 ISBN 978-90-263-4798-6
