= Emile Jansen =

Dutch actor (1959–2024)

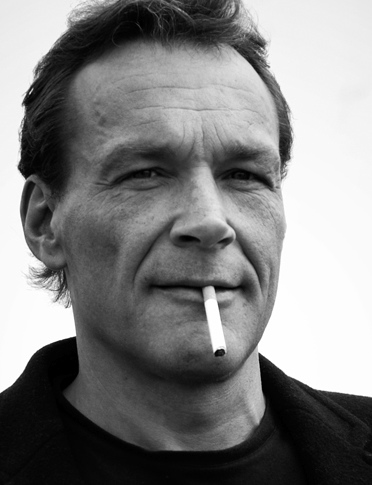
- Jansen in 2008
- Born: 21 November 1959; Apeldoorn, Netherlands
- Died: 18 November 2024 (aged 64)
- Occupation: Actor

Emile Jansen (21 November 1959 – 18 November 2024) was a Dutch stage, television and movie actor.

== Life and career ==
Jansen studied at Gymnasium Apeldoorn and afterwards the drama school in Arnhem. Jansen became most known for playing in the television series like Goede tijden, slechte tijden as detective Huibert Remonder. He also played in several movies including Winter in Wartime.

He won the Entertainment Award at the Canary Wharf London in 2008 for his leading role in the mobile phone comedy series Shop Spank.

Jansen died on 18 November 2024, at the age of 64.
