= Herman van der Zandt =

Dutch journalist and presenter

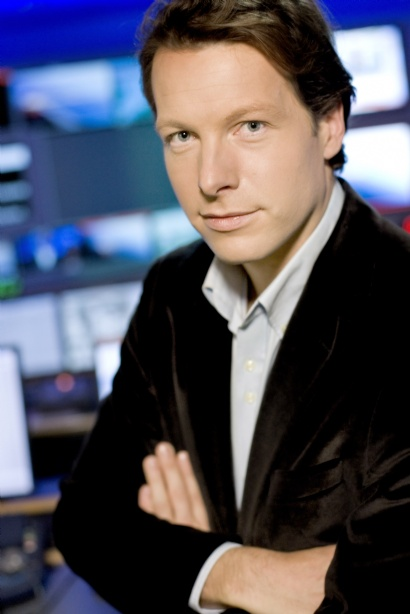
- Van der Zandt in 2007
- Born: 9 August 1974 (age 51); Breda, Netherlands
- Education: History
- Alma mater: Utrecht University
- Occupations: Journalist, Newsreader, Television presenter
- Notable work: NOS

Herman van der Zandt (born 9 August 1974 in Breda) is a Dutch journalist, newsreader, and television presenter.

== Biography ==
Van der Zandt grew up in the Boeimeer neighborhood of Breda. From the age of eleven to thirteen, he created radio programs with his older brother for the Breda hospital radio station Studio Audio, including a youth show called Zwamneus en Co.

He studied history at Utrecht University from 1993 to 1998 and joined NOS News in 2001.

Initially, Van der Zandt became known as a newsreader for NOS Radionieuws. In the summer of 2006, he became a presenter for the NOS Journaal, occasionally filling in on NOS Journaal op 3. From 2008, he became a regular presenter.

In 2010, he occasionally filled in as a presenter for NOS Langs de Lijn. Between 2010 and 2015, he was also a co-presenter and results analyst for live election broadcasts, earning him the nicknames “Touch Herman” and “Herman de Schermman”.

He was the face of the Paralympic Summer and Winter Games coverage for NOS.

During the Giro 555 fundraiser on 18 November 2013 for victims of Typhoon Haiyan, he presented live broadcasts all day on NPO 1—from the first morning news at 6:30 am until the end of the main evening show at 12:30 am.

On 12 December 2012, he won the celebrity division of the Groot Dictee der Nederlandse Taal, making 17 errors in a dictation written by Adriaan van Dis.

Before gaining national fame, Van der Zandt appeared in 1998 as a contestant on the quiz show Met het Mes op Tafel hosted by Joost Prinsen. In early 2015, he temporarily took over hosting duties from Prinsen. Later that year, he became the permanent host.

In late 2015, he transitioned from NOS News to NOS Sport. He presented NOS Studio Sport, Langs de Lijn, and Langs de Lijn En Omstreken. Mart Smeets considered him a suitable successor for De Avondetappe, and Van der Zandt had already done some segments in 2014. During the 2016 Summer Olympics, he co-hosted Rio Live.

He also co-hosts a popular cycling podcast called "Tweewielers".

Leading up to the 2021 Dutch general election, Van der Zandt joined Xander van der Wulp and Marleen de Rooy in the weekly political series Rondje Binnenhof. He continued until autumn 2023 when he left NOS. Gerri Eickhof succeeded him.

In December 2022, he was announced as co-presenter of the Top 2000 à Go-Go, replacing Matthijs van Nieuwkerk after his controversy.

In July 2023, it was announced that he would leave NOS in October after 23 years, to join KRO-NCRV in 2024.

In September 2023, it was announced that he would succeed Philip Freriks in 2025 as host of De slimste mens.

From 2024, he also took over the show Het Gevoel van de Vierdaagse from Fons de Poel.

Because KRO-NCRV did not allow side projects with other broadcasters, he had to stop presenting Met het Mes op Tafel, which was taken over by Sjoerd van Ramshorst.

In the summer 2024 season of De slimste mens, he appeared as a contestant, winning the grand finale against Max Terpstra and Maartje van de Wetering after five daily wins. He returned again in the 25th season (winter 2024/25) but lost in the quarterfinals to Donny Ronny.

== Personal life ==
Van der Zandt has two children from a previous marriage. He is in a relationship with Anna Gimbrère. Together, they have one child.
