= Gerri Eickhof =

Dutch journalist (born 1958)

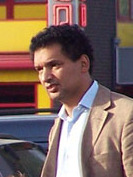
- Eickhof reporting in Amsterdam in 2007
- Born: March 21, 1958 (age 68); Amsterdam, Netherlands
- Education: Anthropology; program maker course
- Occupations: Journalist, writer

Gerri Eickhof (born 21 March 1958 in Amsterdam) is a Dutch former reporter and journalist, who worked for the NOS Journaal for 37 years.

== Early life and education ==
Eickhof had a Dutch mother, and his father was of Surinamese descent. He was raised by his mother and grandparents and grew up in Tuindorp Oostzaan, Amsterdam. He and his mother lived with her parents.

From 1964 to 1970, he attended the Sint Stephanus Bellesini School and then the Waterlant College until 1976. He later studied anthropology at the University of Amsterdam, the University of Bradford, and Utrecht University until 1983.

== Career ==
Eickhof started his journalism career after hearing a radio announcement that Migrantentelevisie Amsterdam was offering a course for aspiring television show creators. After completing the course in 1986, he interned for a year at the current affairs program Kenmerk produced by the IKON. He later applied to the NOS Journaal's foreign desk, where he started in 1988 as an editor and reporter.

He initially worked as a foreign editor and then became a field reporter. Eickhof covered crises in Congo-Brazzaville, Bosnia, Kosovo, Iraq, Rwanda, and Burundi. During the Kosovo War in 1999, he reported from Belgrade, where he stirred controversy by wearing a target symbol on his lapel during a NOS broadcast as a protest against the bombing of a Serbian TV station. He spent most of his career reporting from within the Netherlands and occasionally published weblogs reflecting on his journalistic decisions.

From 29 September 2023 until his retirement, Eickhof replaced journalist and presenter Herman van der Zandt as the main presenter of the YouTube series Rondje Binnenhof.

On 16 March 2025, Eickhof presented his final report for the NOS Journaal and subsequently retired. Since political correspondent Van der Wulp transitioned to the sports desk around the same time, Rondje Binnenhof was discontinued.

Shortly after his retirement, Eickhof made weekly appearances on the television show Even tot hier, where he posed the final question of the episode from his home.

== Personal life ==
Eickhof has spoken about experiencing racism throughout his life. As a child, he was regularly insulted and targeted by a group of children who called him names like "negro" and "Black Pete", and threw pebbles and dirt clumps at him. In adulthood, he encountered overt racism and incidents he attributes to racial bias. He stated that he was stopped by police 42 times in his life without specific reason, which he sees as a manifestation of systemic racism.

== Bibliography ==
Eickhof is also an author. His published works include:

Year	Title	Publisher	ISBN	Description
2009	Met de tram door Amsterdam	Conserve	ISBN 9789054292821	Part of the "Nederlandreeks" series by NOS reporters. Covers 16 tram routes over 213 kilometers in Amsterdam.
2009	Bestemming Bagdad	Conserve	ISBN 9789054292890	Diary entries from his experiences during the Iraq War in 2003.
