= Tanja Koen =

Dutch radio and television announcer and host (1925–2026)

Dorothea Adriana Maria (Tanja) Koen-Ketelaar (9 December 1925 – 24 August 2026) was a Dutch radio and television announcer and television host who worked for the Dutch Christian Radio Association (NCRV). She died on 24 August 2026, at the age of 100.
