= Paulien Cornelisse =

Dutch author and cabaret performer (1976–2026)

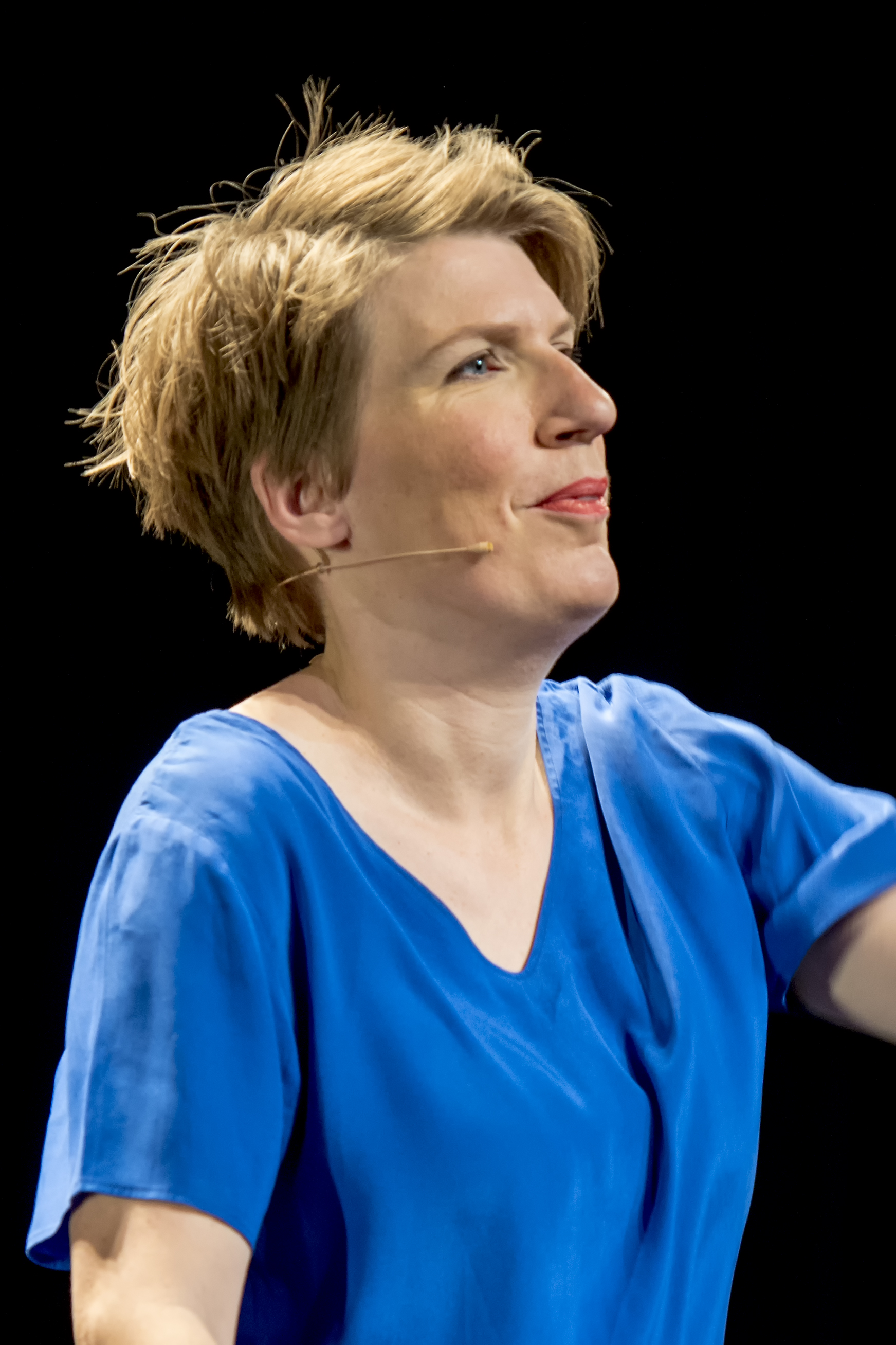
- Cornelisse in 2015
- Born: 24 February 1976; Amsterdam, Netherlands
- Died: 30 September 2026 (aged 50); Amsterdam, Netherlands
- Occupations: Author; Cabaret performer; Television presenter

Paulien Cornelisse (Dutch: [pʌuˈlin kɔrˈneːlɪsə]; 24 February 1976 – 30 September 2026) was a Dutch writer, comedian, podcast creator and television presenter. She received the Platina boek award after selling more than half a million copies of her book Taal is zeg maar echt mijn ding. Cornelisse won the 2013 season of the television show Wie is de Mol?. From 2025 to 2026, she was the jury member in the television quiz show De slimste mens.

== Career ==
Cornelisse was the author of the 2009 book Taal is zeg maar echt mijn ding about interesting or peculiar use of language in daily life. In 2013, she received the Platina boek award after selling more than 500,000 copies of the book. The book was adapted to film. The romantic comedy film Taal is zeg maar echt mijn ding directed by Barbara Bredero premiered in 2018. The film won four awards at the 2018 Glendale International Film Festival in Los Angeles: best film, best female lead role, best director and best film made by a woman.

She won the 2013 season of the television show Wie is de Mol?. She was nominated for the Poelifinario cabaret award in 2014. She was nominated for her third cabaret show Maar ondertussen.

Cornelisse published the book De verwarde cavia in 2016. She published the sequel De verwarde cavia: terug op kantoor in 2024. Cornelisse won the NS Publieksprijs in 2025 for this book. She was also nominated for this award for her books En dan nog iets (2012), De verwarde cavia (2016) and Taal voor de leuk (2019).

In 2018, Cornelisse presented the television show Tokidoki about Japan. She presented the second season of the show in 2020.

She published the Boekenweekessay titled Hèhè - Over wat we zeggen zonder dat we het doorhebben as part of the 2025 Boekenweek. The essay was reprinted during the Boekenweek due to popular demand.

Cornelisse succeeded Maarten van Rossem as jury member in the television quiz show De slimste mens. Herman van der Zandt succeeded Philip Freriks as presenter of the show. In December 2025, Cornelisse was named Taalstaatmeester 2025 in the radio show De Taalstaat.

She was a columnist for the newspaper De Volkskrant.

== Illness and death ==
Cornelisse was diagnosed with cancer in 2021. She was also diagnosed with cancer in 2024. Cornelisse died from cancer on 30 September 2026, at the age of 50.

== Awards ==
- NS Publieksprijs (2025)

== Bibliography ==
- Taal is zeg maar echt mijn ding (2009)
- En dan nog iets (2012)
- De verwarde cavia (2016)
- Taal voor de leuk (2019)
- De verwarde cavia: terug op kantoor (2024)

== Selected filmography ==
=== As presenter ===
- Tokidoki (2018, 2020)

=== As jury member ===
- De slimste mens (2025–2026)

=== As contestant ===
- Wie is de Mol? (2013)

=== As herself ===
- Zomergasten (2010)
- MINDF*CK (2024)
