= Rudolf Spoor =

Dutch television director (1938–2024)

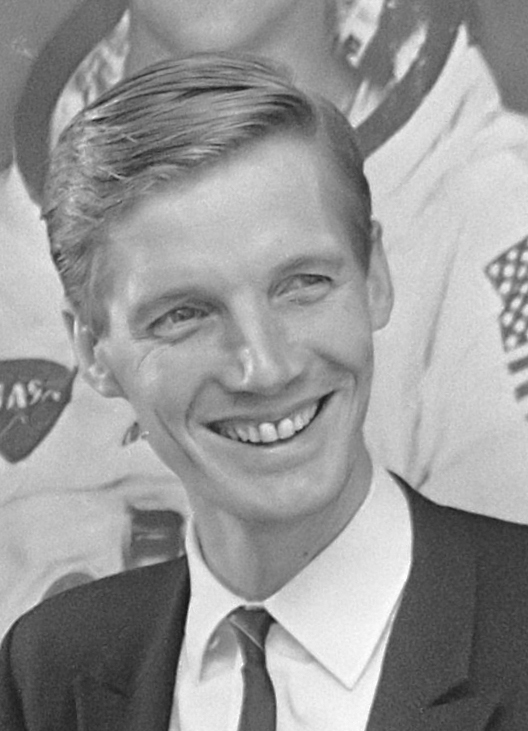
- Spoor in 1969
- Born: Rudolf Michiel Spoor; 16 August 1938; Heemstede, Netherlands
- Died: 23 May 2024 (aged 85)
- Occupation: Television director

Rudolf Michiel Spoor (16 August 1938 – 23 May 2024) was a Dutch television director.

Spoor worked as a television director for the Nederlandse Omroep Stichting (NOS) for over forty years and made many TV programs about historical events. The most famous moments were the moon landing of Apollo 11 in 1969 and the 2002 wedding ceremony of Prince Willem-Alexander and Máxima Zorreguieta Cerruti at the Nieuwe Kerk in Amsterdam including the famous shot of Máxima's 'tear'.

Spoor died on 23 May 2024, at the age of 85. Many people responded to his death, including the Dutch King, the Dutch Queen and the Dutch former Queen.
