= Art Rooijakkers =

Dutch television presenter (born 1974)

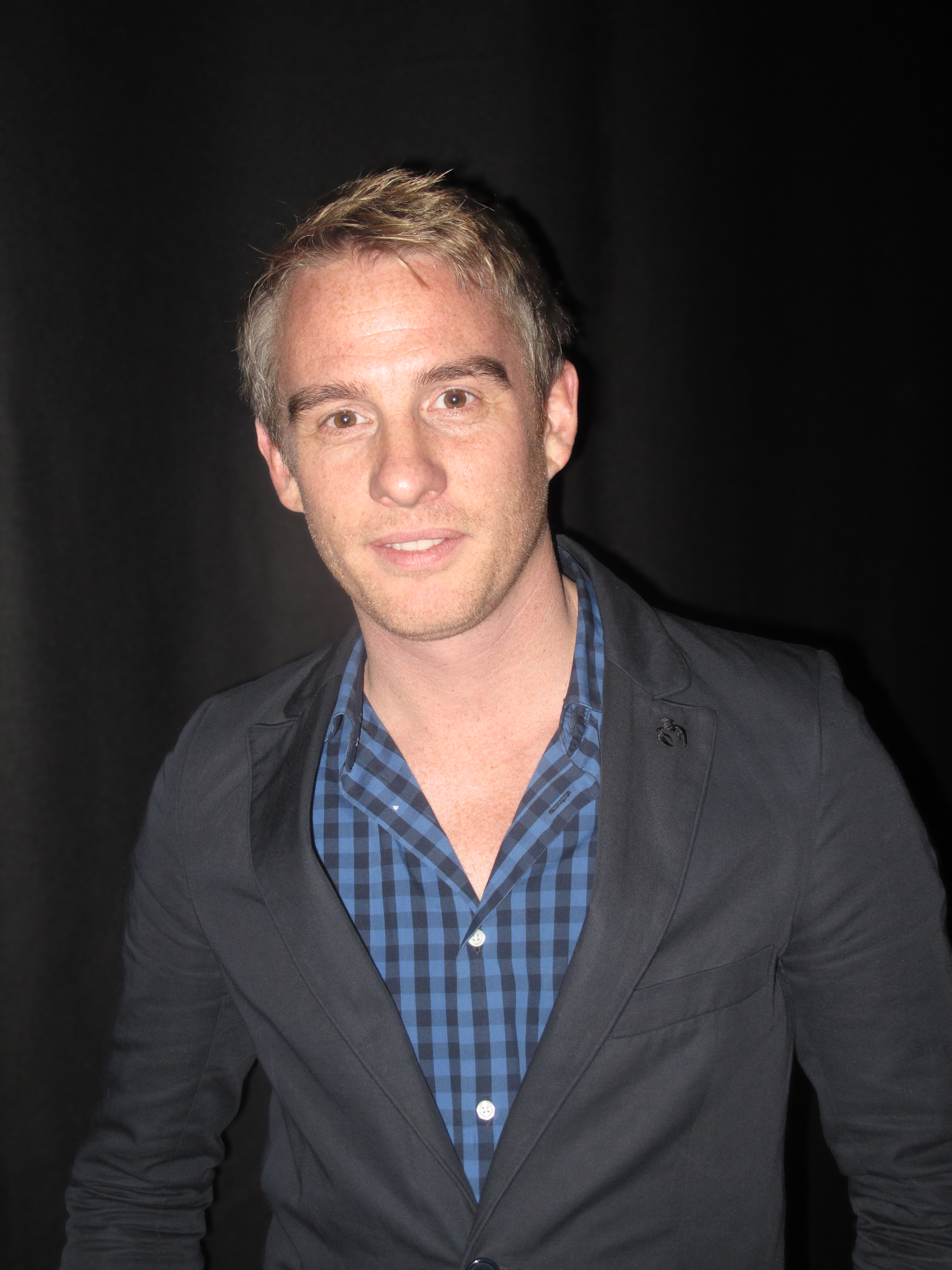
- Art Rooijakkers (2012)
- Born: 29 August 1974 (age 52); Geldrop, Netherlands
- Occupation: Television presenter
- Known for: Wie is de Mol?

Art Rooijakkers (born 29 August 1974) is a Dutch television presenter. He is best known as the presenter of the popular television show Wie is de Mol? from 2012 to 2018. He also presented multiple seasons of the shows Peking Express and Rooijakkers over de vloer.

== Career ==
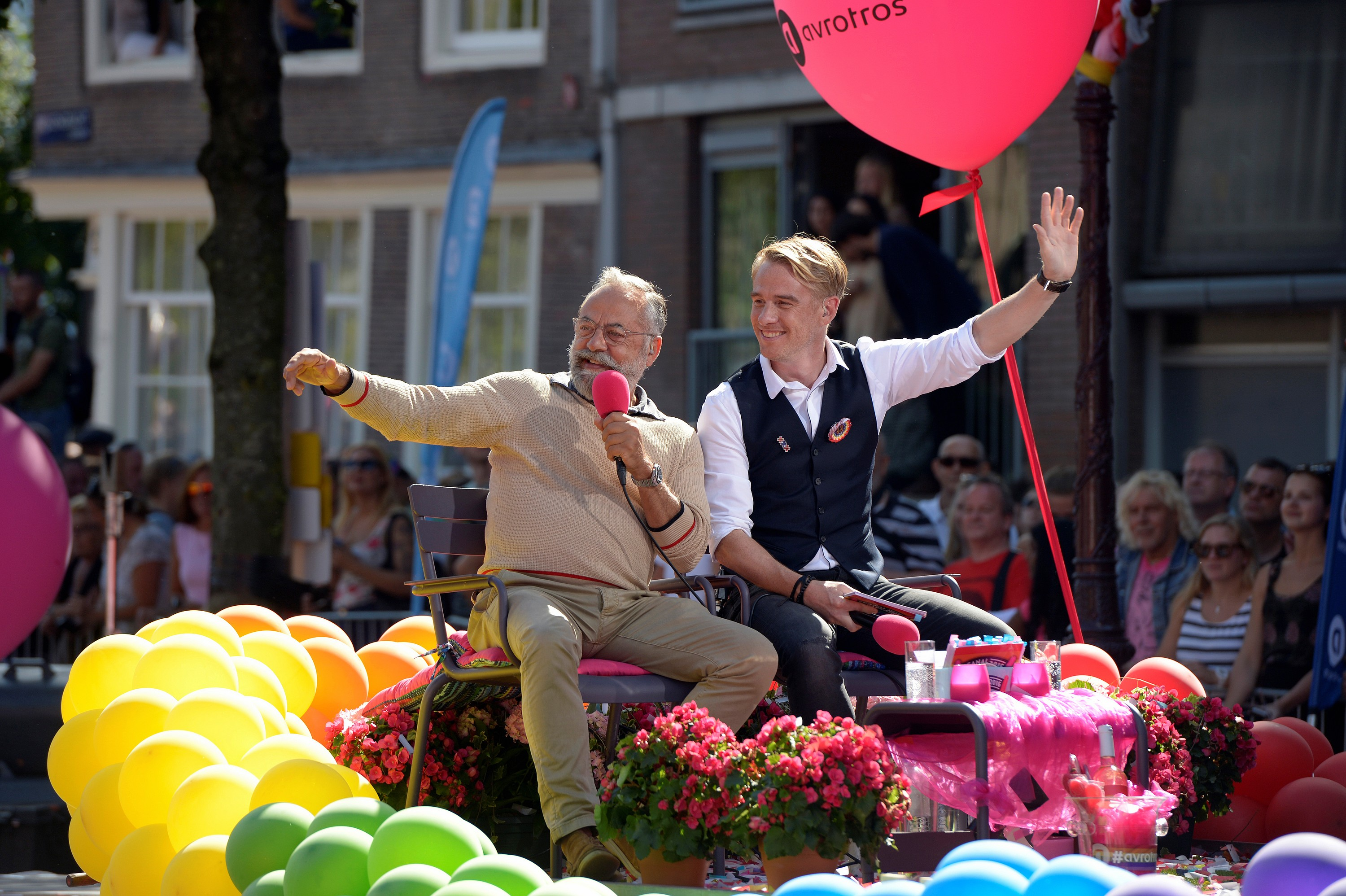
Rooijakkers at EuroPride 2016 in Amsterdam.

In 2011, Rooijakkers participated as candidate in the popular television show Wie is de Mol?. He won the show by identifying the mole (Patrick Stoof) and he went on to present the show himself from 2012 to 2018. He succeeded Pieter Jan Hagens as presenter of the show and Rik van de Westelaken succeeded Rooijakkers in 2019. In 2011, Rooijakkers presented the Dutch version of the game show Fort Boyard, alongside Dutch radio DJ Gerard Ekdom. He also presented the show Mag ik u kussen? in which multiple comedians compete to kiss a celebrity. He presented the second season of the show in 2012.

Rooijakkers appeared as news reader in the 2012 film De club van lelijke kinderen. He also participated as contestant in the game shows Weet Ik Veel (in 2013) and Ik hou van Holland (in 2009 and 2011). In 2014, he won that year's summer edition of the quiz show De slimste mens.

From 2011 till 2014 he presented Cash op Zolder, the Dutch version of the British television show Cash in the Attic. In 2014, he presented Bureau Rooijakkers en Verster together with Lauren Verster, a show about social issues. In 2015, he appeared in an episode of the television show Familie Kruys. In the same year, he was also a guest in the first season of De Jopie Parlevliet Show, a talk show hosted by Richard Groenendijk as his alter ego Jopie Parlevliet.

In 2018, Rooijakkers decided to work for the broadcast organisation RTL Nederland and he presented the game show Praat Nederlands met me later that year. In the show the questions revolve around the Dutch language and how language is used in society. In October 2018, he also co-presented the game show Holland-België together with Jonas Van Geel. The show featured 'team Netherlands' and 'team Belgium' competing against each other with Ruben Nicolai and Louis Talpe featuring as team captains respectively.

In the summer of 2019, Rooijakkers presented the talk show Zomer met Art for ten weeks. The show featured a different co-presenter in each week, including Merel Westrik, Gert Verhulst, Richard Groenendijk and Ellie Lust. In 2019, he also presented the second season of Praat Nederlands met me. Rooijakkers also presented the show Iedereen had het erover in which he talks to people that became part of a well-known and often widely discussed news event. In 2021, he presented Iedereen had het erover: Coronaspecial, an episode of the show in which he talks to people affected by the COVID-19 pandemic in the Netherlands.

In 2020, Rooijakkers appeared in the photography game show Het Perfecte Plaatje in which contestants compete to create the best photo in various challenges. He also presented the television show Rooijakkers over de vloer in which he visits national and international celebrities. The show can be seen as the successor to the show Van der Vorst Ziet Sterren which was presented by Peter van der Vorst for 16 seasons. In 2021, he presented B&B Vol Liefde in which he followed bed and breakfast owners in their search for love.

In December 2021 and January 2022, Rooijakkers presented a season of De Verraders which aired on Videoland. In 2022, Rooijakkers and Geraldine Kemper present the Expeditie Robinson: All Stars season of the television series Expeditie Robinson. He also presented the third season of B&B Vol Liefde. He also presented Expeditie Robinson 2023.

Rooijakkers and Malou Petter presented the show Nieuws van de Dag in 2025. Since February 2025, he was unable to present the show due to problems with his vocal cords. He returned to the show in June 2025. Rooijakkers presented the show until August 2025. He also presented the 2025 reality game show Het Zwaard van Damocles. In the same year, he appeared in an episode of the anniversary season of the television show Wie is de Mol?. In 2026, he presented the survival show Survive Your Family. He is also the presenter of the 2026 quiz show Dit weet jij niet?!.

== Filmography ==
=== As presenter ===
- Peking Express (2006 – 2008)
- Fort Boyard (2011)
- Mag ik u kussen? (2011 – 2012)
- Wie is de Mol? (2012 – 2018)
- Bureau Rooijakkers en Verster (2014)
- De Erfenis van Anne Frank (2015)
- Het beste brein van Nederland (2016, 2017)
- Helden van de Wildernis (2017)
- Holland-België (2018)
- Praat Nederlands met me (2018, 2019)
- Zomer met Art (2019)
- Iedereen had het erover (2019)
- Rooijakkers over de vloer (2020 – 2024)
- B&B Vol Liefde (2021, 2022, 2023)
- De Verraders (Videoland edition, 2021 – 2022)
- Expeditie Robinson: All Stars (2022)
- DNA Singers (2023 – 2024)
- Expeditie Robinson season 25 (2023)
- Nieuws van de Dag (2025)
- Het Zwaard van Damocles (2025)
- Survive Your Family (2026)
- Dit weet jij niet?! (2026)

=== As actor ===
- De club van lelijke kinderen (2012)
- Familie Kruys (2015)

=== As contestant ===
- Ik hou van Holland (2009 and 2011)
- Wie is de Mol? (2011)
- Weet Ik Veel (2013)
- De slimste mens (2014)
- Het Perfecte Plaatje (2020)
- Het Jachtseizoen (2023)

=== As himself ===
- De Jopie Parlevliet Show (2015)
- De Winter Voorbij (2015)
