= Mart Smeets =

Dutch radio and television personality, writer and columnist

Jan Martinus Smeets
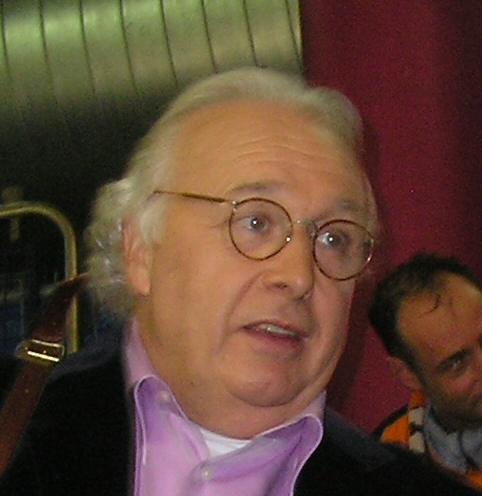
- Mart Smeets in Heerenveen (2007)
- Born: 11 January 1947 (age 79); Arnhem, Netherlands
- Occupations: radio and television host, writer

Jan Martinus "Mart" Smeets (born 11 January 1947, in Arnhem) is a Dutch radio and television personality, writer, and columnist.

== Television ==
Mart Smeets is a long-time sports presenter and commentator with the Dutch public broadcaster NOS. He is best known for his coverage of the Tour de France, but also comments on speedskating, basketball (having played at the national level himself, gaining 6 caps as international player), and most other sports, except football (although he did present a news program around the 2006 FIFA World Cup). The 2012 Tour de France was his last assignment during his NOS tenure; he later announced that he would continue to work for them as a freelancer.

== Radio ==
Together with Leo Blokhuis, Smeets presented a weekly radio show, For the Record, on Radio 2. The show featured two hours of rarely played music. The show started in 1992 and was cancelled in February 2014.

== Writing ==
Mart Smeets writes columns for several newspapers and magazines, including Trouw. He is also the author of more than 25 books.

== Praise and criticism ==
Smeets has received notable criticism from viewers, especially through social media. People watching the 2012 Tour de France shows, for instance, marked off Smeets-cliches on a Smeets Bingo card, and an anti-Smeets Facebook page ("Mart Auf Wiedersehen Smeets") was joined by 40,000 people. Also popular was an online Smeets cliche generator.

== See also ==
- Radio 2
