= De slimste mens =

Dutch television quiz show

- Genre: Quiz
- Based on: De Slimste Mens ter Wereld
- Presented by: Herman van der Zandt (2025–present)
- Judges: Paulien Cornelisse (2025–2026)
- Country of origin: Netherlands
- Original language: Dutch
- No. of seasons: 2 (Tien); 1 (RTL 4); 28 (NPO 1 / NPO 2)

Production
- Running time: 40-45 minutes
- Production company: Mediawan Skyhigh

Original release
- Network: Tien
- Release: 2 January – 2 November 2006
- Network: RTL 4
- Release: 28 September – 19 November 2009
- Network: NPO 1 (2022-present); NPO 2 (2012-2022)
- Release: 23 July 2012 – present

De slimste mens (English: The smartest human), until 2009 known as De slimste, is a Dutch television quiz show. It is based on the Belgian series De Slimste Mens ter Wereld. It airs Monday through Friday at 21:30 on NPO 1.

== Concept ==
In each episode, three contestants play against each other. The contestants vary from more to less known and each season aims to have a diverse group. During filming, the contestants take seats in three chairs. The contestant that won the previous episode takes the right spot, the runner-up from the previous episode takes the middle seat, and a new contestant takes place on the left. The order for the first episode is chosen at random.

Each round gives contestants the opportunity to earn more seconds to their clock. The rounds consist of different types of questions, where, for example, four or five answers must be given, connections must be found, keywords must be provided for a video about events from recent history, or puzzles must be made. By answering questions correctly, seconds can be gained, but these seconds are lost again by taking the time to answer. If a contestant says 'stop' or 'pass' when not all answers are given, the other contestants get a chance to earn the remaining seconds, always starting with the one who currently has the lowest amount of seconds left.

After five rounds, the contestant with the highest amount of seconds left is called 'the smartest of the day', and advances to the next episode by default. The two remaining contestants compete in a finale. The winner of that finale also advances to the next episode, while the losing contestant gets replaced by a new contestant in the next episode.

In the final week of each season, the five best players from the season return to the newcomer's seat on the left, counting the amount of episodes they were in and how many times they won an episode. For example, if one contestant was in 6 episodes with 3 wins, they were better than one with 6 episodes and 2 wins. The best player returns in the last episode, the season finale. In the last episode, the finale is played with the two with the highest scores after the fifth round, not with those in second and third place, as usual. The winner of that finale gets named 'de slimste mens'.

== Gameplay ==
Each episode consists of five rounds, with an additional finale at the end. From the second to the fifth round, when a contestant passes before giving all the answers, the two other contestants always get a chance to complete it, starting with the one who has the least amount of seconds left at the time.

=== 3-6-9 ===
Each contestant gets 60 seconds to start with. In this first round, fifteen questions are asked, starting with the contestant on the newcomer's seat. If they answer correctly, they can answer the next question and so on. When they answer incorrectly, the question gets passed on to the next contestant. The 3rd, 6th, 9th, 12th and 15th question are worth 10 seconds. In this round, the clock is not yet running when answering the questions, but there is a time limit for answering them.

=== Open Deur ('open door') ===
In this round, questions are asked by a celebrity. The contestant currently in third place gets to choose first. Usually, each season has a small group of celebrities, with a few pre-recorded questions that are shown throughout the whole season. They start with a short story, and always end the question with "What do you know of....?". Four answers are to be given, each worth 20 seconds.

=== Puzzel ('puzzle') ===
In this round, a grid of 3x4 is shown to each contestant, starting with the one currently in third place. Three words are to be found, each linked to four of the twelve keywords and each worth 30 seconds. Usually, the combinations make up expressions, compound words, famous names, et cetera.

=== Gallerij ('gallery') ===
Each contestant gets shown eight pictures, all with an overarching theme, again starting with the one currently in third place. Throughout answering, the contestant usually finds out what the connection is between the pictures. Each picture is worth 15 seconds.

=== Het collectieve geheugen ('the collective memory') ===
Each contestant gets shown a video clip, again starting with the one currently in third place. With each clip, five terms are to be found. Just as the previous rounds, the other contestants can fill out the remaining answers, however, that makes a bigger difference than usual. In this round, the first answer that is given is worth 10 seconds, the second is worth 20 seconds and so on, so the one who gives the fifth answer earns 50 seconds. Because of this, the ranking of seconds for each contestant is given after each clip. The one with the highest amount of seconds after this round is named 'de slimste van de dag' ('smartest of the day') and advances to the next episode by default.

=== Finale ===
In the finale (frequently called the 'day finale'), the contestant get asked "what do you know about...?". The question is always first asked to the one who has the least amount of seconds. Each question has five answers. For each correct answer, 20 seconds are removed from the opponent's clock. The goal is to get the opponent's clock to zero seconds. The winner of the finale advances to the next episode, taking the middle seat, while the losing contestant gets replaced by a new contestant in the next episode. In the last episode of the season, the finale is played with the two with the highest scores after the fifth round, not with those in second and third place, as usual. The winner of that finale is named 'de slimste mens' ('the smartest human').

== Hosts and judges ==
Color key:

Host
Judge
Participant

Host/judge	2006	2009	Season																											
Host/judge	2006	2009	1	2	3	4	5	6	7	8	9	10	11	12	13	14	15	16	17	18	19	20	21	22	23	24	25	26	27	28
Linda de Mol																														
Martijn Krabbé																														
Philip Freriks																														
Herman van der Zandt																														
Cees Geel																														
Jan Verheyen																														
Maarten van Rossem																														
Paulien Cornelisse																														

== Seasons ==
=== Tien/RTL 4 seasons ===
Season	Winner	Runner-up	Third place	Judge	Host	Network
Spring 2006	Jeroen Kijk in de Vegte	Hans Beerekamp	Peter van der Vorst	Cees Geel	Linda de Mol	Tien
Fall 2006	Bart Chabot	Marc van der Linden	Dieter Troubleyn	Jan Verheyen	Linda de Mol	Tien
Fall 2009	Anniko van Santen	Jan Heemskerk	Suzanne Bosman	Jan Verheyen	Martijn Krabbé	RTL 4

=== (KRO-)NCRV seasons ===
Season	Premiere	Finale	Winner	Runner-up	Third place	Judge	Host
1	23 July 2012	31 August 2012	Arjen Lubach	Jan Rot (Note: After receiving a cancer diagnosis in 2021, he requested to participate again. He participated again in the 19th season in 2021. He passed away in 2022.)	Mark Huizinga	Maarten van Rossem	Philip Freriks
2	22 July 2013	30 August 2013	Pieter Derks	Charly Luske	Hanna Bervoets	Maarten van Rossem	Philip Freriks
3	16 December 2013	24 January 2014	Owen Schumacher	Jeroen Kijk in de Vegte	Margriet van der Linden	Maarten van Rossem	Philip Freriks
4	14 July 2014	29 August 2014	Art Rooijakkers	Erik Dijkstra	Diederik Jekel	Maarten van Rossem	Philip Freriks
5	15 December 2014	23 January 2015	Tom Roes	Remco Veldhuis	Chris Zegers	Maarten van Rossem	Philip Freriks
6	20 July 2015	28 August 2015	Diederik Smit	Nynke de Jong	Daan Nieber	Maarten van Rossem	Philip Freriks
7	14 December 2015	22 January 2016	Eric Smit	Govert Schilling	Ernst Daniël Smid	Maarten van Rossem	Philip Freriks
8	25 July 2016	2 September 2016	George van Houts	Wytse van der Groot	Joël Broekaert	Maarten van Rossem	Philip Freriks
9	12 December 2016	20 January 2017	Klaas Dijkhoff	Hiske Versprille	Stefano Keizers	Maarten van Rossem	Philip Freriks
10	24 July 2017	1 September 2017	Angela de Jong	Mischa Blok	Thomas Olde Heuvelt	Maarten van Rossem	Philip Freriks
11	18 December 2017	26 January 2018	Sander Schimmelpenninck	Paul Jansen	David Lucieer	Maarten van Rossem	Philip Freriks
12	16 July 2018	31 August 2018	Roelof de Vries	Philip Huff	Anne Fleur Dekker	Maarten van Rossem	Philip Freriks
13	10 December 2018	18 January 2019	Peter Hein van Mulligen	Arjan Postma	Mark Tuitert	Maarten van Rossem	Philip Freriks
14	15 July 2019	30 August 2019	Rob Hadders	Kees van Amstel	Niña Weijers	Maarten van Rossem	Philip Freriks
15	23 December 2019	31 January 2020	Marieke van de Zilver	Khalid Kasem	Marc de Hond	Maarten van Rossem	Philip Freriks
16	13 July 2020	28 August 2020	Astrid Kersseboom	Jeroen Grueter	Francis van Broekhuizen	Maarten van Rossem	Philip Freriks
17	14 December 2020	22 January 2021	Rob Kemps	Andries Tunru	Emma Wortelboer	Maarten van Rossem	Philip Freriks
18	12 July 2021	27 August 2021	Lisa Loeb	Bram Douwes	Joost Oomen	Maarten van Rossem	Philip Freriks
19	13 December 2021	21 January 2022	Jacob Derwig	Frank Heinen	Martin Visser	Maarten van Rossem	Philip Freriks
20	11 July 2022	26 August 2022	Jasper van Kuijk (Note: Van Kuijk performed the finale while in quarantine (due to COVID-19). He was present through a video call.)	Anniko van Santen	Erik van Muiswinkel	Maarten van Rossem	Philip Freriks
21	26 December 2022	10 February 2023	Martin Rombouts	Anniek Pheifer	Mátyás Bittenbinder	Maarten van Rossem	Philip Freriks
22	31 July 2023	8 September 2023	Tom Kleijn	Jörgen Tjon A Fong	Nandi van Beurden	Maarten van Rossem	Philip Freriks
23	18 December 2023	26 January 2024	Joes Brauers	Jan Dirk van der Burg	Tim Hartog	Maarten van Rossem	Philip Freriks
24	22 July 2024	30 August 2024	Herman van der Zandt (Note: After winning the 24th season, he went on to host the show from the 26th season onwards.)	Max Terpstra	Maartje van de Wetering	Maarten van Rossem	Philip Freriks
25 (Note: In celebration of the 25th and final season for host Freriks and judge van Rossem, this season was subtitled 'smartest of the smartest', having previous finalists compete again. The winner, Frank Heinen, was given the exchange trophy indefinitely.)	23 December 2024	31 January 2025	Frank Heinen	Klaas Dijkhoff	Lisa Loeb	Maarten van Rossem	Philip Freriks
26	1 September 2025	18 October 2025 (Note: Broadcasting of the final two episodes was delayed because of the annual Gouden Televizier-Ring Gala taking place on 16 October.)	Brankele Frank	Thomas van Luyn (Note: Van Luyn previously participated in the first season in 2012.)	Rob Jetten	Paulien Cornelisse	Herman van der Zandt
27 (Note: The first two episodes featured singer René Karst as a contestant, who passed away shortly after the episodes were filmed. By request of his family, the episodes aired as planned, with both episodes featuring a tribute by host Herman van der Zandt at the start.)	23 February 2026	10 April 2026	Frank van Leeuwen	Delilah Warcup-van Eyck	Bibi Roos	Paulien Cornelisse	Herman van der Zandt
28 (Note: Jury member Cornelisse passed away on 30 September 2026. Therefore, in the timeslot of episode 8 of the 28th season, NPO 1 aired a recording of her cabaret show Maar ondertussen. Episode 8 aired the next day (featuring a tribute by host Herman van der Zandt), while episode 9 and 10 both aired on 2 October. By her family's request, the remainder of the season aired as planned. The season finale on 6 November also featured a tribute at the start and end of the episode.)	21 September 2026	6 November 2026	Mats Akkerman	Jeroen Gortworst	Claudia de Breij	Paulien Cornelisse	Herman van der Zandt

=== All Stars seasons ===
Three five-episode seasons were made with 'all stars'. Unlike the regular seasons, the All Stars editions have four chairs next to each other instead of three. The 2022 All Stars season was not aired on all weekdays as usual, but weekly on Fridays.

Season	First aired	Last aired	Winner	Runner-up	Third place	
'The smartest vs the rest'	11 December 2017	15 December 2017	Diederik Smit	Nynke de Jong	Erik Dijkstra	Steven Ooms
All Stars 2022	22 July 2022	19 August 2022	Marieke van de Zilver	Peter Hein van Mulligen	Frank Heinen	Owen Schumacher
All Stars 2023	11 September 2023	15 September 2023	Jaike Belfor	Tina Nijkamp	Tex de Wit	Andrea van Pol

== Highest scores ==
Below is a table of the ten highest scores achieved.

Position	Contestant	Date	Score
1	Frank Heinen	24 December 2021 (season 21, episode 10)	663
2	Casper Starreveld	30 October 2026 (season 28, episode 30)	597
3	Delilah Warcup-van Eyck	9 March 2026 (season 27, episode 11)	595
4	Herman van der Zandt	23 July 2024 (season 24, episode 2)	593
5	Roelof de Vries	1 August 2018 (season 12, episode 13)	574
6	Max Terpstra	27 August 2024 (season 24, episode 27)	547
7	Owen Schumacher	19 December 2013 (season 3, episode 4)	542
8	Roelof de Vries	31 July 2018 (season 12, episode 12)	541
9	Thomas van Groningen	12 July 2022 (season 20, episode 2)	538
10	Maaike Schoon	7 April 2026 (season 27, episode 32)	521
