= Eva Jinek =

Dutch-American journalist

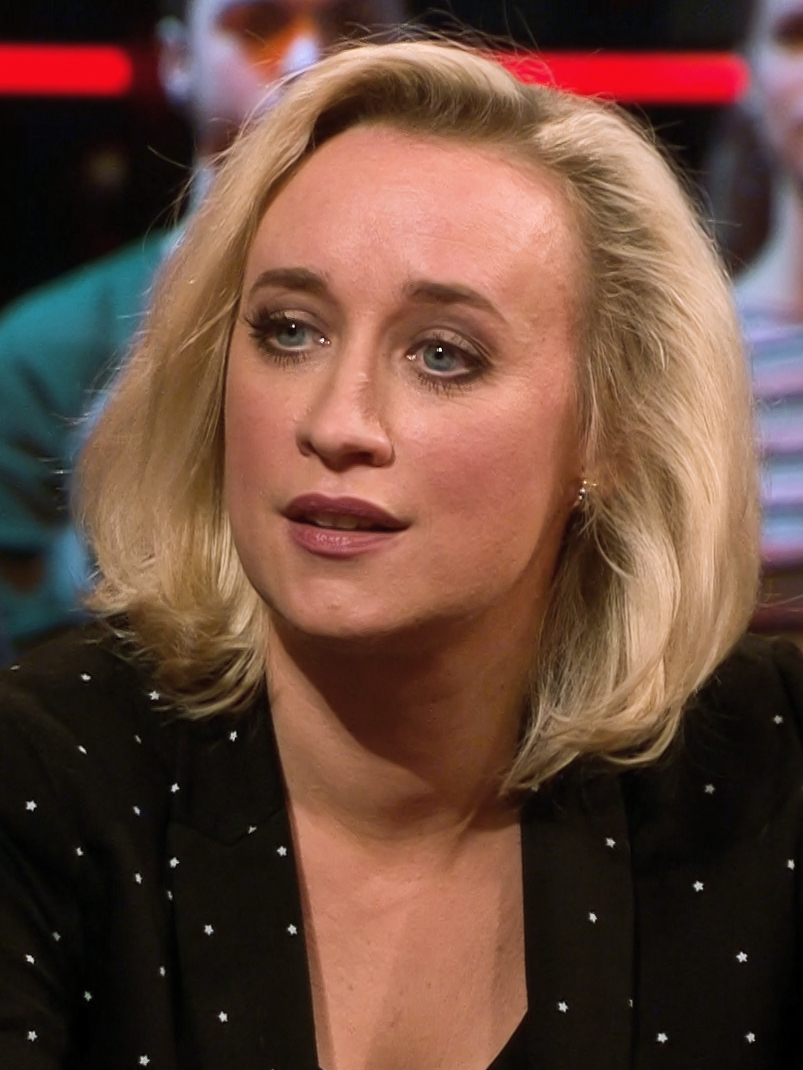
- Jinek in 2018
- Born: 13 July 1978 (age 48); Tulsa, Oklahoma, U.S.
- Education: Leiden University (Master of Arts)
- Occupations: Journalist; Television presenter Radio presenter
- Years active: 2004-present
- Employer(s): NOS; WNL; KRO-NCRV; RTL; AVROTROS
- Organization: RTL
- Television: RTL 4
- Partner(s): Bram Moszkowicz (2010–2012); Freek Vonk (2013–2015); Dexter van der Voorn (2015– )
- Children: Pax
- Awards: Zilveren Televizier-Ster Presentatrice
- Website: https://www.evajinek.nl/

Eva Jinek (born 13 July 1978) is a Dutch-American journalist and television presenter.

== Biography ==
Jinek was born in Tulsa, Oklahoma and grew up in Washington, D.C., where she attended Sheridan School. Her family is of Czech descent. Her family decided to move to the Netherlands when she was eleven. Jinek recounts that "before I went to high school, they decided that they would prefer that my brother and I grow up in Europe. I remember it was six weeks until I spoke my first word in Dutch."

After studying American history at the University of Leiden in 2004, she became foreign editor of the Dutch public news network NOS Journaal, where she covered the United States. In addition, since the end of 2007 she anchored the news show NOS Journaal 3. Since the autumn of 2008, Jinek presented the morning and afternoon news bulletins of the NOS. In May of that year she joined with fellow editor Monique van Hoogstraten, the editor of "Het maakbare nieuws," a collection of eighteen stories with foreign journalists, provided in response to the book "Het zijn net mensen" (They are almost Human) of journalist-writer Joris Luyendijk.

She is well known for her coverage of the USA, since her work as a co-host of the show 'Amerika Kiest' (America Votes) of the NOS on the U.S. presidential elections, seen from the Netherlands on November 4 and 5, 2008. Together with Philip Freriks she reported directly from the Occidental Restaurant near the White House. About the preparation of Amerika Kiest, Jinek told TV guide Mikro Gids: "The last weeks before the broadcast Amerika Kiest totally dominated my life, at the end, even 24 hours a day. I was so nervous. It felt like all eyes were on me. I just thought: Oh my God, let me do well. Really well!"

On January 20, 2009, she was the host of the live broadcast on Nederland 1 of the inauguration of Barack Obama as 44th President of the United States.

On March 2, 2009, she made international news when a video of her adjusting her shirt surfaced on the internet. In the video she mutters and shouts mild curses in both English and Dutch. She then exclaims, "Yeah, Boobies!" at one point, continuing with, "Mother of God. Yeah, if you have it, flaunt it!" and citing her mother who might tell her: "I can see your breasts!" She responded the next day, saying she was not annoyed nor embarrassed by the leaked video.

In early 2010, Jinek was announced as one of the main presenters of the new news show Nieuwsuur (News Hour), alternating with anchor Twan Huys, but her relationship with former criminal defense lawyer Bram Moszkowicz sparked controversy about a conflict of interest, as Moszkowicz often appeared in the news; as a result, Jinek agreed to step down.

She debuted as a radio host on June 4, 2010, for the program Met het Oog op Morgen (A Glance at Tomorrow), She hosted the show every Monday night until 2014. On August 28, 2011 Jinek presented her last 6pm bulletin for the NOS.

In 2015 Jinek got her own late night talk show, Jinek, at 23:00 at the KRO-NCRV. Jinek stayed on as the presenter of her show during her pregnancy in 2018. She took her maternity leave a week earlier than planned. In 2018 she gave birth to a son, Pax.

Since 2020, Jinek has moved from KRO-NCRV to RTL 4. At this commercial tv-station, the talkshowhost alternates with Beau van Erven Dorens with her late night talkshow with the same name.

In July 2023, Jinek announced that she had signed a four-year contract with AVROTROS, where she would start work in early 2024 and develop her own programs. Jinek indicated that she was looking forward to it, but wanted to wait to return to work until she had given birth to her second child. Her new talkshow (titled Eva) premiered on 2 September 2024.

== Filmography ==
- De Grote Sinterklaasfilm en de Strijd om Pakjesavond (2023)

== In popular culture ==
- Mentioned in the song "Eva Jinek" by Joost Klein
