= Maarten van Rossem =

Dutch historian (born 1943)

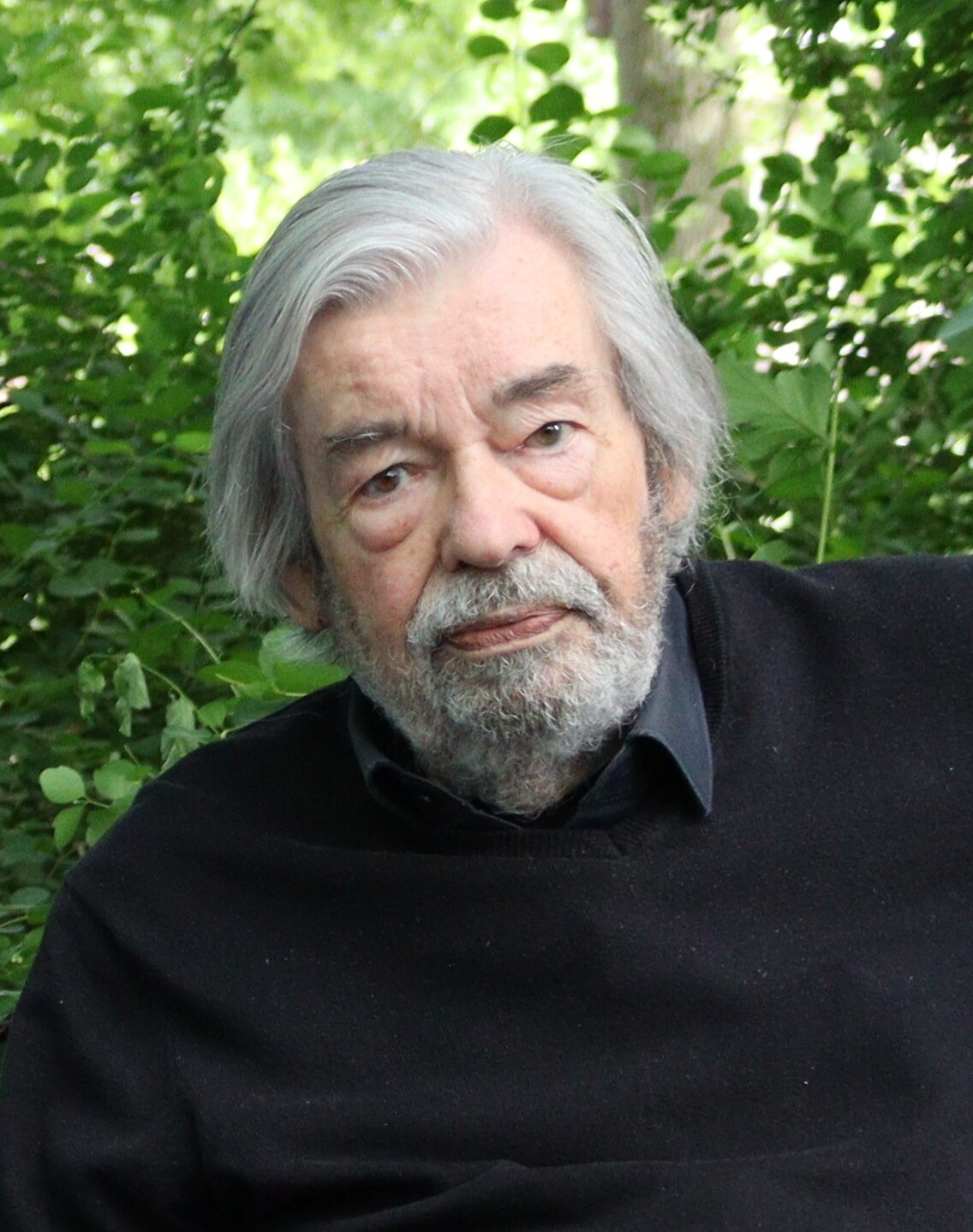
- Van Rossem in 2025
- Born: 24 October 1943 (age 82); Zeist, Netherlands
- Education: Utrecht University, dr., PhD
- Occupations: historian, writer, presenter, commentator
- Years active: 1984–present
- Notable work: De Verenigde Staten in de Twintigste Eeuw (1984)
- Television: Presenter; Van Rossem in Amerika (2009); Maliebaan in Beweging (2010); Van Rossem for President (2012); Van Rossem Vertelt (2012-); Hier zijn de Van Rossems (2015-); Frequent guest Pauw & Witteman, later Pauw; De Wereld Draait Door; De Laatste Show (2009)
- Political party: Labour Party (Complicated relationship, see Politics)
- Awards: Dutch historian of the year 2003, 2010, and 2011 Republican of the year 2016
- Maarten van Rossem's voice
- Website: Maarten Online

Maarten van Rossem (born 24 October 1943) is a Dutch historian, presenter, and social commentator. He is a professor emeritus of modern history at Utrecht University. Van Rossem specializes in the history and politics of the United States. As an expert on America he is a frequent guest on television talk shows. His public career began when he was invited to comment on the 1984 U.S. vice-presidential elections. In addition to his regular TV appearanced he gives frequent public lectures.

== Early life and education ==
Maarten van Rossem was born in 1943 in Zeist and grew up in Wageningen, both in the Netherlands. His fascination with the United States began during his childhood when, seeing his visiting American cousins each had their own photo camera came to the conclusion that that all Americans were wealthy.

He attended grammar school in Wageningen, where he excelled in the sciences. Initially, he enrolled in pharmacy studies at the Utrecht University due to his strong performance in chemistry. However, dissatisfied with the subject, he secretly switched to studying history—a decision met with opposition from his family who feared that he would struggle to find a job.

Despite growing up in a right-wing, fiscally Liberal environment he joined the Labour Party in 1967.

His interest in the United States persisted, prompting him to collect newspaper clippings on Martin Luther King Jr., President Kennedy and the Chicago riots.

Van Rossem completed his studies after eight years, graduating with a master's degree cum laude. His senior thesis, supervised by historian Hermann von der Dunk, focused on the historiography of the Cold War. Through this research he discovered his passion for writing, later reflecting, "You can say that at that point I became a historian."

For his PhD, Van Rossem studied the Partisan Review, again under Von der Dunk's guidance. Allowed to change his research focus twice, he ultimately took 12 years to complete his doctoral thesis.

== Academic career ==
In 1984, he published his bestselling book The United States in the 20th century (Dutch title: De Verenigde Staten in de Twintigste Eeuw). Due to the acclaim and success of the book, he became a regular guest pundit on various Dutch television channels as an export on American presidential elections. Since then he is often asked to speak at events concerning Dutch-American relations.

In 1996, he became a tenured professor occupying the endowed chair of modern history at the Utrecht University. This appointment allowed him to speak on a wider range of subjects. He was forced to retire from this position in 2008 as he reached the age of statutory retirement age in the Netherlands. He derided this action, saying "Yesterday I had a normal working day; today my activities are seen as nothing more than occupational therapy for the elderly, focused on stimulating the brain, in order to prevent its precipitate decline after receiving the first state pension cheque", he said on his first day of retirement. He continues to give public lectures all around the country.

== Television ==
Van Rossem is a regular guest in talkshows and news programs. He has had a history column in several programs. He has presented a number of programs himself, including (historical) documentaries and a quiz.

Van Rossem was a friend of Theo van Gogh. They made a 1997 talkshow together on local Amsterdam network AT5, and he played a role in In the Interest of the State, one of his films.

Between 2012 and 2025, Van Rossem was the sole jury member on the Dutch version of De Slimste Mens quiz. Paulien Cornelisse succeeded him in this role in 2025.

In the summer of 2012 he toured the United States in preparation of a documentary series on the 2012 presidential elections.

Together with his siblings Vincent and Sis he has presented a program on Dutch, Belgian and German cities. Sis died in 2022. In 2019, he made a similar show with Vincent about cities in former East Germany. In 2023, Van Rossem and Vincent presented the show De Broeders Van Rossem. Van Rossem and Philip Freriks present the 2026 travel television show Maarten & Philip op het spoor door Europa in which they travel through Europe by train.

== Politics ==
During the 2012 Dutch general elections he was a lijstduwer for the Labour Party, which earned them 5,929 votes, ranking him the 16th most popular candidate.

Although having disavowed Labour because of its role in the second Rutte cabinet and having voted for D66 in 2017, he was lijstduwer in his home city of Utrecht for the 2022 Dutch municipal elections, claiming that local parties were different than national parties.

== Magazine ==
The first issue of his own magazine, the Maarten!, was published in the summer of 2008. Initially a one time addition to the Historic Newspaper (Dutch: Historisch Nieuwsblad), the glossy magazine has since grown into its own, circulating on a bimonthly basis. Even though the format parodies personality magazines like that of Linda de Mol, its content is serious, running editorials on current events and putting them against a historic background.

== Podcast ==
Since 2020 Van Rossem has his own podcast, presented by Tom Jessen.

== Personal life ==
He is married to Winnie van Rossem-Robijns since 1989, she is former editor of Margriet magazine. The couple has two children.

The moth species Lambula vanrossemi is named after him.
