= Dieuwertje Blok =

Dutch actress, writer and presenter (1957–2025)

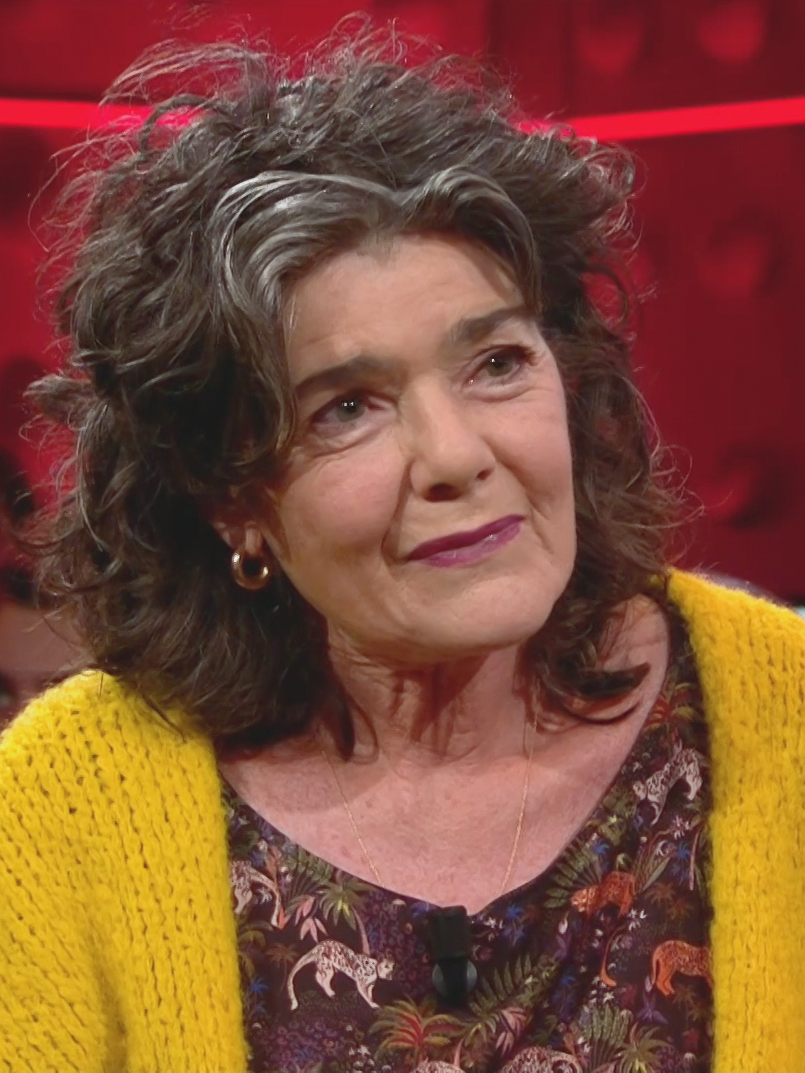
- Blok in 2018
- Born: Dieuwer Sarah Blok; 8 August 1957; Nederhorst den Berg, North Holland, Netherlands
- Died: 2 March 2025 (aged 67)
- Education: Gemeentelijk Gymnasium Hilversum; Frederik van Eedenschool Hilversum
- Occupations: Actress; writer; radio presenter; television presenter
- Years active: 1978–2024
- Known for: Het Sinterklaasjournaal
- Spouses: Paul de Bruin (m. 1992, divorced); Peter de Bie (m. 2000)
- Children: 2
- Relatives: Henri Peter Blok (grandfather); Stella Fontaine (grandmother); Dick Blok (father); Wouter Blok (uncle); Tessel Blok (sister)

Dieuwer Sarah "Dieuwertje" Blok (8 August 1957 – 2 March 2025) was a Dutch actress, writer and radio and television presenter who was best known for presenting Het Sinterklaasjournaal from 2001 to 2023.

== Early life and education ==
Dieuwer Sarah Blok was born on 8 August 1957 in Nederhorst den Berg, North Holland, which is also where she was raised. She was the second of three daughters of the Dutch historian Dick Blok and Hennie Gazan, a Dutch Jew. She was the maternal granddaughter of Dutch Jewish artist and comedian Stella Fontaine and the paternal granddaughter of Dutch Egyptologist Henri Peter Blok. Her younger sister was Tessel Blok, a radio presenter. Her uncle was Wouter Blok, a professor of Dutch literature.

During the Second World War, Blok's mother and her Jewish family went into hiding, with most of her immediate family killed by Nazi German occupiers, except for her parents, grandparents and one cousin. She married Blok's father, a non-Jew, in 1955. Influenced by the war, Blok's parents raised her to believe in political participation and social responsibility, and to fight against prejudice and for political freedom; this would influence Blok's political beliefs in her later life. However, Blok stated in an interview from 2001 that she "wasn't really a good child", describing herself as "catty and vain" with a tendency to become "very angry" and admitting to having had "a lot of fights" with her sisters. Blok's sister Tessel has nonetheless described their childhood as "free and carefree". In her adolescence, Blok also performed at the local amateur theatre in Nederhorst den Berg.

Blok went to school in the Gooi and in Hilversum. She passed the entrance exam for Gemeentelijk Gymnasium Hilversum and studied there for three years from 1969 to 1972. Although her father wanted her to attend a gymnasium, Blok disliked the school and started to fail at her studies there in her second year after she became involved with the local hippie movement, later admitting in interviews to drinking, taking drugs and stealing money. At this time, she wanted to leave the gymnasium and study in England as an au pair. According to Blok's sister Tessel, Blok wanted to stop using drugs and believed that moving abroad was the only way to do so. After her third year at the gymnasium, she dropped out and started studying a MAVO diploma at Frederik van Eedenschool Hilversum from 1972 to 1973, where she felt she fit in better because of the less academic atmosphere of the school. After the completion of her studies, she moved to Knowl Hill, England, where she spent a year as an au pair looking after three boys and studied the Certificate in Advanced English. After a year in England, Blok returned to the Netherlands, settling in Watergraafsmeer, Amsterdam, where she studied a HAVO diploma from 1974 to 1976.

== Career ==
=== Early career and activity (1978–1989) ===
Blok's broadcasting career began in 1980, when she started working as a TV continuity announcer for the Katholieke Radio Omroep (KRO). She had previously been employed as a photo editor for the KRO's broadcasting magazine Studio from 1978 to 1980. While working at the magazine, she was noticed by members of the KRO's broadcasting team, who believed she would make a suitable presenter for the KRO's ourput. She was subsequently employed as a radio and television presenter for the KRO in 1980. During her tenure at the KRO, she presented the television programmes Sport op Maandag and Middageditie and the radio programme Goal, alongside her continuity duties.

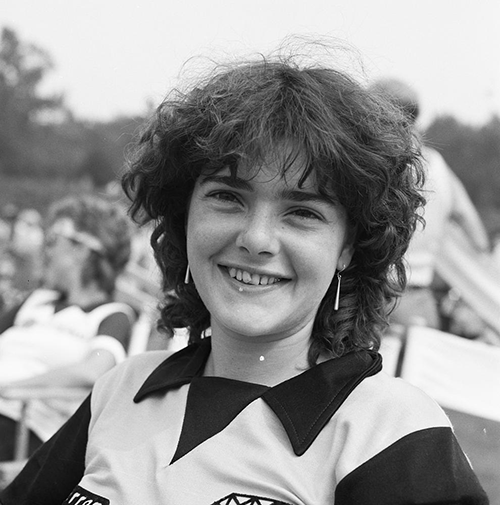
Blok represents the KRO in an episode of AVRO's Sterrenslag from 1981. Her youthful appearance and persona made her popular with Dutch audiences at the start of her career as a television presenter, with Blok becoming a teen idol.

At only 23 years old, Blok's presence was unusual for the Dutch television industry at the time, which was then dominated by older, male presenters. Her youthful appearance and persona quickly made her popular with Dutch audiences; she became a teen idol and reportedly became the first presenter in the country with her own fan club. Blok found this new-found popularity difficult. In an interview from 2009, she recalled one incident where she was threatened on her answering machine by "some creep". Blok explained that she "wasn't prepared for [the fame] and didn't know what to do with that idiocy. I didn't know anymore whether [the attention] was about me or the image people had of me, which made me very insecure". She later said in an interview from 2020 that she "wouldn't want to repeat" her life between the ages of 20 and 30, adding that she had felt uncertain about her identity and self-conscious about her appearance.

In 1983, a song about Blok called Dieuwertje was promoted by the radio DJ and presenter Frits Spits as a hit on his show De Avondspits, though it failed to chart the Dutch Top 40.

In 1985, Blok publicly declared that she was an atheist in an article she wrote for Vrij Nederland. This unintentionally led to her sacking from the KRO, as it did not allow atheists to present its programmes at the time. Following her departure from the KRO, she joined the Omroepvereniging VARA and the Nederlandse Onderwijs Televisie (NOT). At the VARA, she presented Filmnieuws, Nederland museumland and Kunst ligt op straat. In September 1986, she also started co-presenting the VARA television programme Drie vrouwen with Ati Dijckmeester and Marjolijn Uitzinger. However, in November of that year she announced her departure from the programme to focus on other projects, with Astrid Joosten chosen to replace her as presenter.

=== RTL 4 and talk show lawsuit (1989–1992) ===
In June 1989, it was announced that Blok would leave the VARA to present for RTL-Véronique. In the same year, she started co-presenting the weekly children's news programme Schooltv-weekjournaal on Friday mornings for Nederland 3. In July 1989, it was announced that she would co-present the RTL-Véronique programme Middag Magazine with Marc Postelmans. Starting with the channel's first broadcast in October 1989, Blok also co-presented RTL-Véronique's De 5 Uur Show with Postelmans and Viola Holt. In May 1990, it was announced that Blok would no longer co-present De 5 Uur Show, with Catherine Keyl presenting in her place. From June 1990, Blok presented the twice-a-week Prime Time Show for RTL-Véronique, alternating with Holt.

In April 1990, it was announced that Blok would present her own talk show for RTL Véronique, originally planned to be broadcast weekly on Tuesday nights over the summer. In July 1990, it was announced that Blok's talk show would air every Monday evening from September 1990. The first episode of the talk show, also named Dieuwertje Blok, was broadcast on 17 September 1990. The guest of the first episode was the actor Ton van Duinhoven. In October 1990, Block signed a two-year contract with RTL-Véronique to present the talk show. The contract stipulated that Blok be offered to present another programme comparable to her talk show by RTL-Véronique if it went off the air. Blok's talk show was taken off the air by RTL 4 (Note: RTL-Véronique was renamed RTL 4 in late 1990.) in March 1991. At the time, a spokesman from RTL 4 stated that the show was not renewed for the winter season as Blok and RTL 4 could not come to an agreement over the show's formula during the renewal negotiations. In a report from the Leidsch Dagblad from May 1992, it is stated that Blok's talk show was cancelled because of disappointing ratings and because of RTL 4's editor-in-chief Feike Salverda, who had published a critical report into Blok's performance at the organisation without her knowledge. Except for a brief period in 1992, Blok's television career was in hiatus from her departure from RTL 4 in 1991 until 1994.

The cancellation of Blok's talk show led to a legal dispute between Blok and RTL 4. To meet the stipulations agreed in the contract, RTL 4 offered Blok to present two of its shows, the art programme Studio Rembrandt and the film programme Bios. However, Blok refused these offers, arguing that these shows were not comparable in status to a talk show. On 3 October 1991, Blok sued RTL 4 and took them to court, demanding that they either offer her a "suitable television programme" for her to present or pay her the ƒ381,000 salary agreed in the contract until its expiration in October 1992 as compensation. In their defence, RTL 4 argued that Blok was being insincere and only cared about money. On 10 October 1992, Hans Vrakking, the deputy chief prosecutor of Amsterdam, ruled in favour of Blok, ordering RTL 4 to offer her a reasonable programme or pay her the ƒ381,000 in compensation by 6 November 1992. RTL 4 disagreed with the ruling and did not offer Blok a new programme, arguing that it was not possible to do so. The parties returned to court on 5 December 1992, with Blok now demanding another ƒ100,000 from RTL 4 in damages. Blok argued that her long absence from television under the contract would make it more difficult for her to get back on the air by October 1992. RTL 4 argued that Blok was to blame for the failure of her talk show and that this should be taken into consideration when determining the damages paid. It was again ruled that RTL 4 offer her a new programme or give her compensation, with Blok ultimately receiving ƒ150,000 in compensation.

=== AT5 and return to the KRO (1992–2001) ===
In 1992, Blok featured in the film Dag Jan alongside Wim Kouwenhoven, Hans Hoes, Paul Hoes and Joop Visser. In May 1992, Blok started presenting the talk show Station AT5 Live for AT5, a local channel in Amsterdam, after its editor-in-chief Ad 's-Gravesande wanted her to present the show. Blok was sacked from AT5 after presenting only 12 episodes of Station AT5 Live, after 's-Gravesande was replaced by Fons van Westerloo, who did not express interest in having Blok on the channel. Her television career remained in hiatus until September 1994, when the KRO asked her to return to the organisation to present the breakfast show Ontbijt TV, eventually co-presenting with Rocky Tuhuteru. In an interview from 1996, Blok reflected on the changed attitudes of the KRO from the time she was sacked for being an atheist when she last worked there in 1985, stating that "you can now say out loud that you think differently about matters of faith. There is now much more room for dissenting points of view".

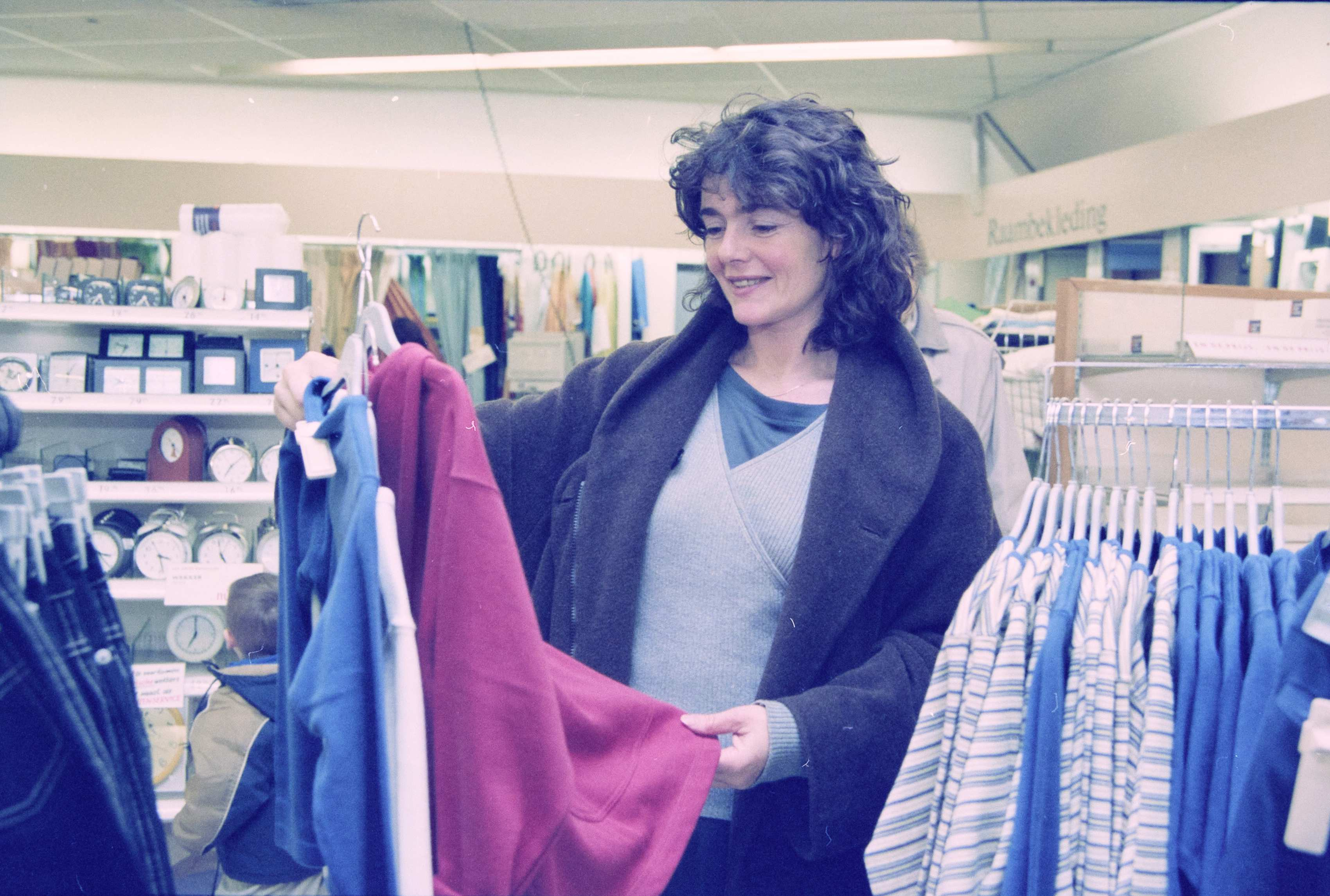
Blok pictured shopping in 1999. From 1994 to 2001, she co-presented Ontbijt TV for the KRO.

In 1996, Blok started presenting the revival of the KRO's monthly programme Er is Meer Tussen Hemel en Aarde, where she discussed faith, spirituality, religion and people's life philosophy with guests from different religious and non-religious backgrounds. Guests who joined Blok on the show included politician Jan Pronk, violinist Emmy Verhey, South African politician Carl Niehaus and professor Herman Pleij, among others. She also started presenting Lekker lezen, an educational programme about books. During this period, she also worked for the broadcasters Humanistische Omroep, Omroep West, Omroep NTR and TROS, the latter for whom she presented the Nieuwsshow with her partner Peter de Bie.

In 1999, Blok featured in the film Based on the Novel, alongside Fedja van Huêt, Rifka Lodeizen, Najib Amhali, Nadja Hüpscher, Femke Lakerveld, Dirk Zeelenberg and Job Gosschalk. In 2001, she featured in the television series Goede daden bij daglicht – Dum Dum Boys. In February 2001, she announced that she would leave Ontbijt TV from July 2001.

=== Het Sinterklaasjournaal (2001–2023) ===
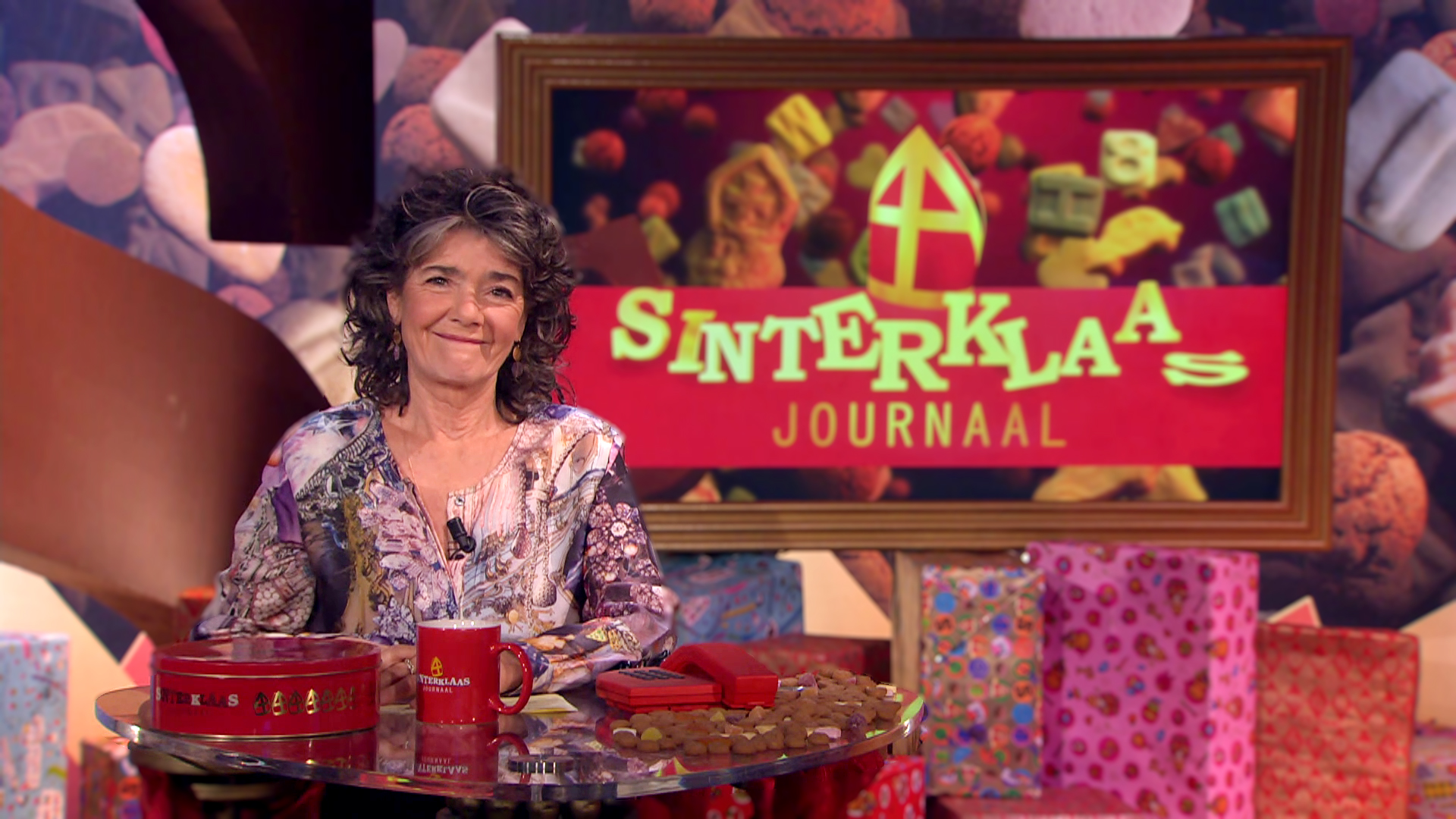
Blok presents an episode of Het Sinterklaasjournal from 2020

Blok was best known for presenting the children's television programme Het Sinterklaasjournaal from its inception in 2001 until 2023. Ajé Boschhuizen, the programme's creator, called Blok in the summer of 2001 to ask her to present the programme. Boschhuizen wanted it to be presented by someone with a sense of irony who was seen as motherly and reliable, and believed that Blok met these criteria. Blok accepted his offer and presented the programme from its first broadcast in November 2001. She came to be associated with the programme, which became popular with Dutch audiences.

== Personal life and death ==
Blok was married to the radio presenter Peter de Bie since 2000. They lived together in Aerdenhout. She had two children, a daughter and a son, from a previous marriage with Paul de Bruin, a photographer from Amsterdam whom she married in 1992. She was an atheist and did not believe in the afterlife or Heaven, stating in an interview from 1996 that "I believe that the only thing that remains after death is that you continue to exist in the memory of people who are still alive". Politically, she was a supporter of the Labour Party (PvdA).

Blok suffered from cancer for which she had undergone a nose amputation. The cancer returned on an undisclosed date within January 2025. She died on the evening of 2 March, at the age of 67.

== Honours ==
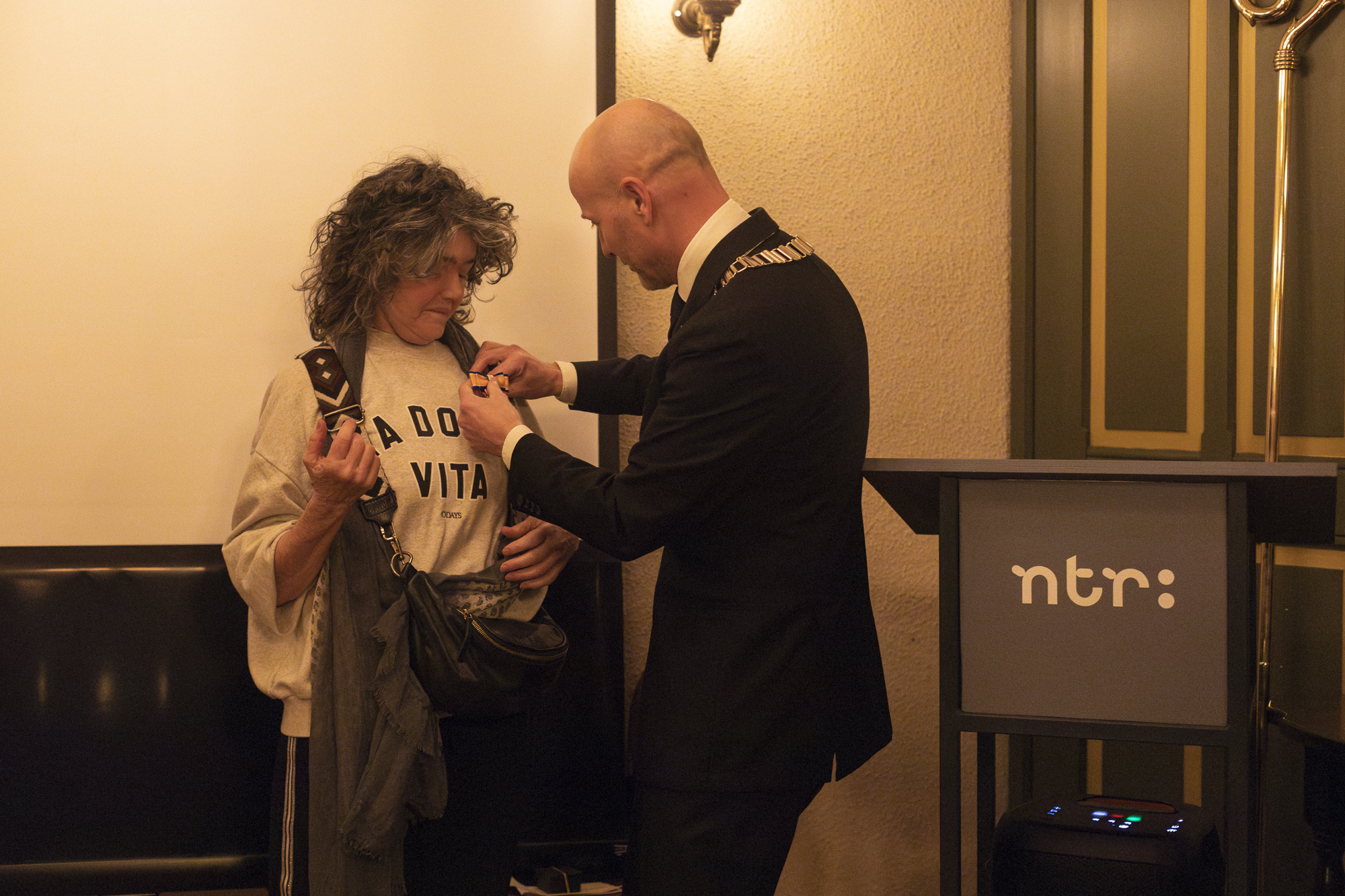
Mark Verheijen presents Blok with the Order of Orange-Nassau in 2024. Blok was awarded the honour for her charity work and work in television.

At the 2013 edition of the Gouden Televizier-Ring Gala, Blok was awarded the Gouden Stuiver award for presenting Het Sinterklaasjournaal, which won that year's nomination for best children's programme. At the 2022 and 2023 editions of the Zapp Awards, Blok was awarded the Favoriete Ster Jeugdprogramma award after she won an audience vote on both occasions.

In December 2024, Blok was made a knight of the Order of Orange-Nassau for her charity work and work in television. She was presented the award by Mark Verheijen, the mayor of Wijdemeren (which includes her birthplace Nederhorst den Berg), at an event attended by her family and her castmates from Het Sinterklaasjournaal.
