= Catherine Keyl =

Dutch television presenter (born 1946)

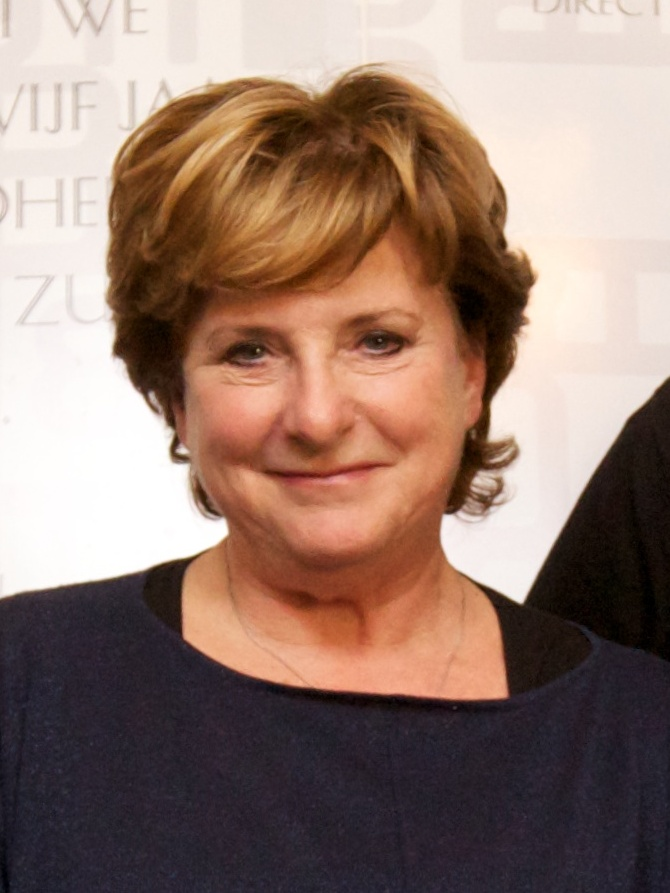
- Keyl in 2010
- Born: Catharina Elisabeth Keyl; 24 October 1946 (age 80); The Hague, Netherlands
- Occupation: Television presenter

Catharina (Catherine) Elisabeth Keyl (Note: Her name is sometimes written as Catherine Keijl.) (born 24 October 1946) is a Dutch television presenter. She is known for presenting her own talk show Catherine. She also presented De 5 Uur Show together with Viola Holt in the early 1990s.

== Career ==
=== Television ===
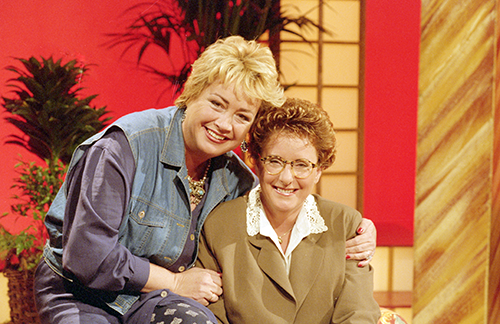
Viola Holt and Catherine Keyl, 1994.

Keyl was a reporter for the news television shows Hier en nu by NCRV and Televizier by AVRO. She also presented the show AVRO Service Salon. In 1990, Keyl became one of the presenters of the television show De 5 Uur Show. She presented the show together with Viola Holt. The first episode of the show aired in 1989 and the show was first presented by Viola Holt, Dieuwertje Blok and Marc Postelmans. Keyl replaced Blok and Postelmans in 1990. Keyl presented the show for five years. After De 5 Uur Show, she presented her own talk show Catherine for several years. The last episode aired on 29 December 2000.

Keyl presented the cooking television show Koken met Sterren with chef Jon Sistermans. She also presented the show Sex: de stand van zaken about sexuality and the sex industry. In 2002, Keyl presented the show Catherine zoekt God in which she talked with Christians about their belief in God. She also presented the 2003 documentary television series Catherine gaat verder in which she looks at various topics.

Keyl and Wilfred Kemp presented the 2012 television show De Andere Finale in which people sing Eurovision Song Contest songs. The show also aired on the same day as the final of the Eurovision Song Contest 2012. The show was held in commemoration of the 125th anniversary of the Leger des Heils, the Dutch arm of The Salvation Army.

In 2005, Keyl began working for broadcaster Omroep MAX. She presented Van nul naar MAX, the first television show by Omroep MAX. She also presented the show MAX en Catherine. She was one of the presenters of the talk show 5op2 which was broadcast in the afternoon by Omroep NTR in 2011 and 2012. Jörgen Raymann, Dieuwertje Blok, Sipke Jan Bousema and Lucille Werner were also presenters of the show. Keyl presented the show on Monday and the other presenters presented the show on the other days of the week. The show ended due to budget cuts.

Keyl was one of the experts in the 2020 television show Dit vindt Nederland presented by Natacha Harlequin. The show drew disappointing viewing figures and the show ended after a few weeks. In 2020, she appeared as guest in the 5 Uur Show, a new version of De 5 Uur Show which Keyl presented for multiple years. The new version of the show was presented by Brecht van Hulten and Caroline Lo Galbo. Roos Schlikker also became a presenter of the show. The show's first episode aired in August 2020 and the show ended in May 2021 due to disappointing viewing figures.

Keyl was nominated for the 2022 Sonja Barend Award for her conversation with Johnny de Mol in an episode of the talk show HLF8.

=== Newspapers ===
Keyl was a columnist for the newspaper De Telegraaf. She became a columnist in 2009. Her last column was published in October 2026.

=== Politics ===
In 2023, she was asked to become the lead candidate of the 50Plus political party for the 2023 Dutch general election but she declined.

=== Television appearances ===
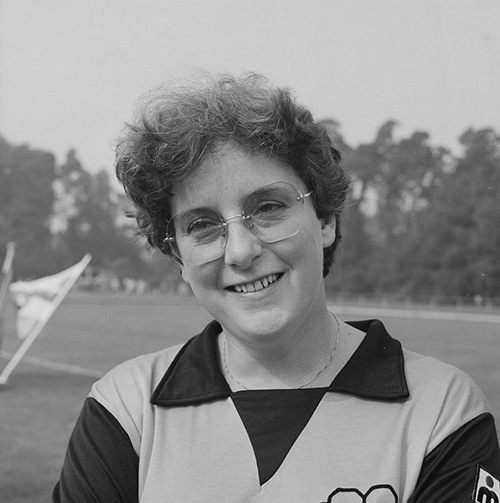
Keyl as contestant in the show AVRO's Sterrenslag in 1981.

Keyl was a contestant in the dance shows Dancing with the Stars and Let's Dance. In 2012, Keyl appeared in an episode of the show Britt en Ymke stellen vragen presented by Britt Dekker and Ymke Wieringa. She was a contestant in the 2012 season of the show Maestro in which contestants compete to become the best conductor.

Keyl was a contestant in the 2013 season of De Grote Bijbelquiz, a quiz show with questions about the Bible. She was also a contestant in 2008 when the show was called De Nationale Bijbeltest. She appeared in the 2013 season of the show Ranking the Stars together with former co-presenter Viola Holt. In 2014, Keyl was a contestant in the quiz show De slimste mens. She was interviewed by Kefah Allush in a 2018 episode of the show De Kist.

She was a contestant in De Spuiten en Slikken Sekstest 2019, a quiz show with questions about sex, and in the 2019 season of the singing competition show The Masked Singer. Keyl was interviewed by Özcan Akyol in a 2020 episode of the television show De Geknipte Gast and by Art Rooijakkers in a 2020 episode of the show Rooijakkers over de vloer. Keyl and Özcan Akyol also appeared as guests in a 2020 episode of the show TV-Toppers presented by Anita Witzier.

Keyl was a contestant in the show Het Nationale Verkeersexamen 2021 in which people retake their driving test. She appeared in an episode of the 2022 game show Think Inside the Box presented by Richard Groenendijk in which contestants have to guess what is inside a large box. Keyl also appeared in an episode of the 2022 show Celebrity Apprentice which aired on Videoland.

In 2025, she was interviewed by Elles de Bruin in an episode of the show TV Monument. In the same year, Keyl took part in the photography television show Het Perfecte Plaatje in which contestants compete to create the best photo in various challenges. She was the first contestant to be eliminated.

Keyl also appears in a 2026 episode of the show Open Casa which airs on Prime Video. She performed as drag queen Bea Babbel Maar in the 2026 season of the drag queen show Make up your Mind.

== Personal life ==
Keyl grew up in the Schilderswijk neighbourhood of The Hague, Netherlands.

In 2006, Keyl was decorated Knight in the Order of Orange-Nassau. She received the award from Peter Rehwinkel, mayor of Naarden at the time, during an episode of the television show MAX en Catherine.

She was married twice. Her father was Jewish and he stayed in the Sachsenhausen concentration camp during World War II. He returned to the Netherlands in October 1945. In 2021, she published the book Oorlogsvader about her childhood and her father.

== Selected filmography ==
=== As presenter ===
- Hier en nu
- Televizier
- AVRO Service Salon
- Véronique Ontbijtshow
- De 5 Uur Show (1990–1995)
- Koken met Sterren
- Sex: de stand van zaken
- Catherine
- Catherine zoekt God (2002)
- Catherine gaat verder (2003)
- MAX en Catherine
- 5op2 (2011–2012)
- De Andere Finale (2012)

=== As expert ===
- Dit vindt Nederland (2020)

=== As contestant ===
- AVRO's Sterrenslag (1981)
- Dancing with the Stars (2005)
- De Nationale Bijbeltest (2008)
- Let's Dance (2009)
- Maestro (2012)
- De Grote Bijbelquiz (2013)
- Ranking the Stars (2013)
- De slimste mens (2014)
- De Spuiten en Slikken Sekstest (2019)
- The Masked Singer (2019)
- Het Nationale Verkeersexamen (2021)
- Think Inside the Box (2022)
- Celebrity Apprentice (2022, Videoland)
- Het Perfecte Plaatje (2025)
- Make up your Mind (2026)
- De Meestergids (2026)

=== As herself ===
- Britt en Ymke stellen vragen (2012)
- De Kist (2018)
- De Geknipte Gast (2020)
- Rooijakkers over de vloer (2020)
- TV-Toppers (2020)
- Adieu God? (2022)
- TV Monument (2025)
- Open Casa (2026, Prime Video)
