= Driehuis (surname) =

Driehuis is a Dutch surname. Notable people with the surname include:

- Frank Driehuis (born 1999), Dutch entrepeneur
- Ingelise Driehuis (born 1967), Dutch tennis player
- Kees Driehuis (1951–2019), Dutch television presenter
- Wim Driehuis (born 1943), Dutch economist
