= The Embarrassment of Riches =

1987 non-fiction book by Simon Schama

- Cover of the first edition
- Author: Simon Schama
- Cover artist: Jan Steen
- Language: English
- Subject: Dutch Golden Age
- Publisher: Alfred A. Knopf
- Publication date: 1987
- Media type: Print (hardcover)
- Pages: 698
- ISBN: 0-394-51075-5

The Embarrassment of Riches: an interpretation of Dutch culture in the Golden Age is a book by historian Simon Schama published in 1987.

== Summary ==
The book covers an overview of the political and socio-cultural aspects of the Dutch Golden Age, Schama depicts themes of Dutch morality and the household economy. He details the Dutch's newfound wealth and conspicuous consumption, while trying to match the restraints of Calvinist philosophy and shame. Schama writes a quasi-anthropological study by utilizing the material culture such as the arts, engravings, illustrated books, delftware and bric-a-brac. He goes on to delve into the culture of smoking, family morality and their excessive penchant with cleaning.

The book details on what gave rise to their sense of community, allegiance and manners. The examination of the Dutch experience as a peculiar people with a manifest destiny saved from the horrors of the flood and the war with the Spanish is much analyzed, seeing their people similar to the reincarnated children of Israel who had entered a new Canaan. To save themselves from the flood, they did this by reclaiming land with dykes and pumping windmills and from this, emerge their communalist ethics.

== Criticism ==
Susan Buck-Morss criticizes Schama for his "selective national history" of the Dutch Republic, "that omits much or all of the colonizing story." "One would have no idea that Dutch hegemony in the slave trade—replacing Spain and Portugal as major players—contributed substantially to the enormous overload of wealth that he describes as becoming so socially and morally problematic during the century of Dutch centrality to the "commerce of the world."

Herman Pleij, a professor of Medieval Dutch literature wrote The Dutch Embarrassment in response.

== Bibliography ==
- Buck-Morss, S. (2000). "Hegel and Haiti". Critical Inquiry. 26 (4): 821–865. doi:10.1086/448993. JSTOR 1344332. S2CID 162278297.
- Pleij, H. (1991). Het Nederlandse Onbehagen (in Dutch). Amsterdam: Prometheus. ISBN 90-5333-068-2.
