= Per Seconde Wijzer =

Dutch television quiz

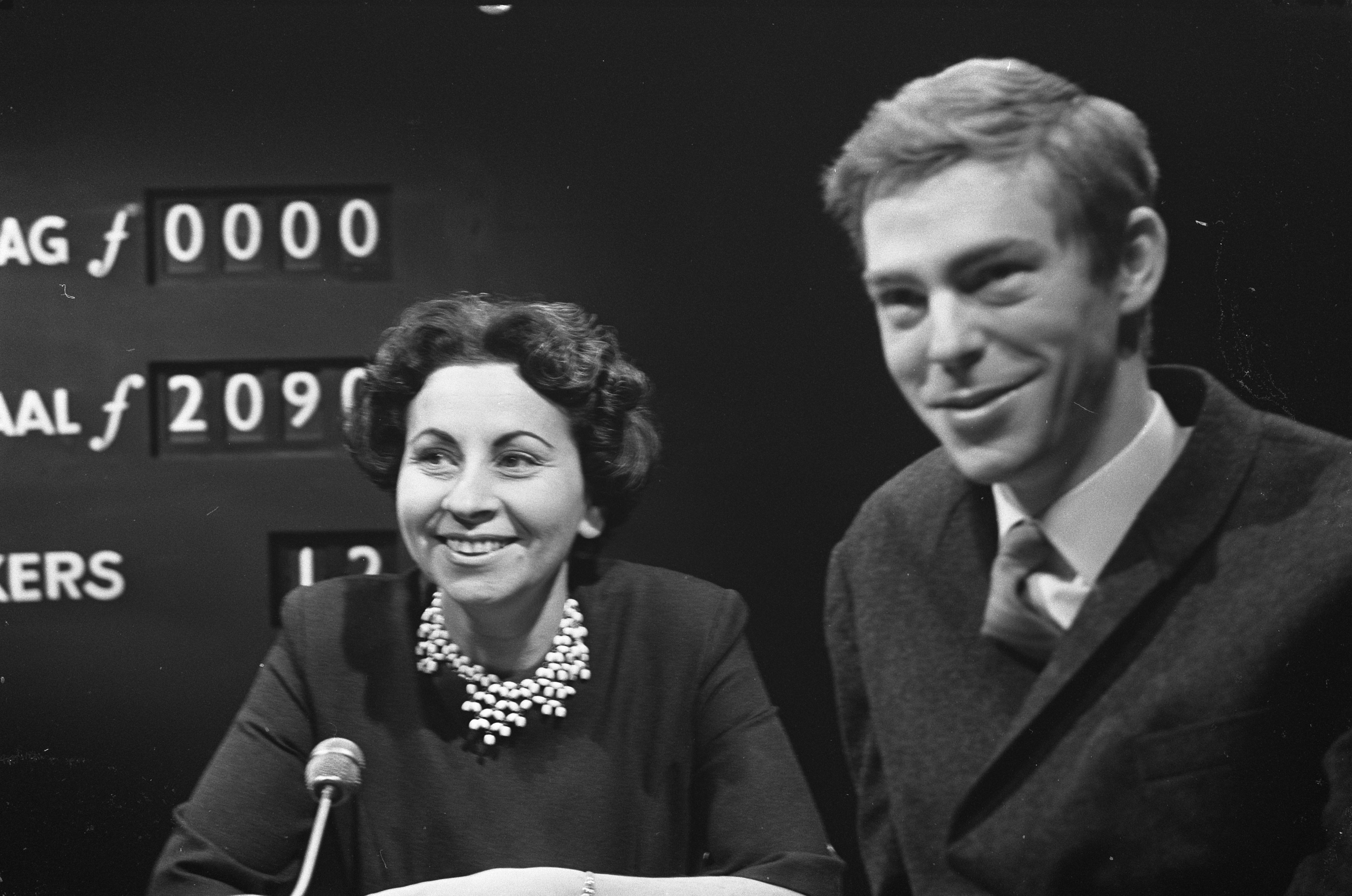
- Host Berend Boudewijn (right) and a contestant in 1968
- Presented by: Berend Boudewijn (1967–1969); Kees Driehuis (1989–2018); Erik Dijkstra (2018–)
- Country of origin: Netherlands
- Original language: Dutch

Original release
- Release: October 7, 1967

Per Seconde Wijzer (Dutch for: Wiser/Smarter by the second) is a Dutch television quiz show. The show first aired on October 7, 1967.

== History ==
Berend Boudewijn presented the show in 1967, 1968 and 1969. The show returned in 1989 and Kees Driehuis was the presenter of the show for 29 years. Driehuis presented the show for the last time on 1 March 2018 and in total he presented 794 episodes of the quiz show. As of 3 September 2018, Erik Dijkstra is the presenter of the show.

In September 2020, a special series of the show was broadcast, called Per Seconde Wijzer: De strijd, which featured only winners of the past season of the show.

== Format ==
The format of the show has seen small changes over the years but has remained largely unchanged at its core. A contestant is faced with four 'questions' or challenges and each question consists of nine possible answers. These answers are presented to the contestant at the beginning of each question and the goal is to match the answers with images or descriptions that are presented afterwards. For example, the contestant may be given the names of famous buildings and the contestant needs to provide a correct answer when images of these buildings are shown, or they may be given a list of devices and must provide the answer when its function is read out by the host.

The contestant is allowed to change previous answers as the question progresses and the contestant is not required to have provided an answer for each part; if a contestant reuses an answer, the part that they had previously given that answer to becomes unanswered, and the contestant must then give a new answer for the previous part or have that item counted as wrong. The contestant is given 200 seconds to complete all the 'questions' or challenges in an episode of the show and it's up to the contestant to say "stop" to stop the clock. After each question the host reviews the answers with the contestant to determine whether the contestant has provided enough correct answers to advance to the next question. Each correct answer adds money to the player's total, as follows:

- Round 1: €20 per part; 5 correct answers required
- Round 2: €25 per part; 6 correct answers required
- Round 3: €30 per part; 7 correct answers required
- Round 4: €35 per part; all 9 correct answers required

The contestant is also given two 'jokers' at the beginning of the game. A contestant can choose to use these before the answers are evaluated to guard against an incorrect answer. Using a joker reduces the player's remaining time by 16 seconds. Deciding to use a joker can be useful in case the contestant is not confident about the provided answers but equally the contestant may end up using one or more jokers unnecessarily.

A player who answers all nine parts of the question correctly is given another joker, but no extra time.

For each question, the player must answer a minimum number of parts correctly (any jokers used count towards the player's correct answers, if any questions were missed); if the player fails to reach the quota, they lose all accumulated money and receive a small commemorative clock. If the player successfully completes all four questions in a round, they have the option to quit with their accumulated winnings or return on the next program to play their next round. A contestant that chooses to play their fourth round is allowed the unused time from the previous rounds in addition to the basic 200 seconds (similar to the "clock format" of the American version of Who Wants to Be a Millionaire). A contestant that completes all four rounds is awarded double their total winnings, for a theoretical maximum of €7,920.
