= Het Sinterklaasjournaal =

Dutch children's television program

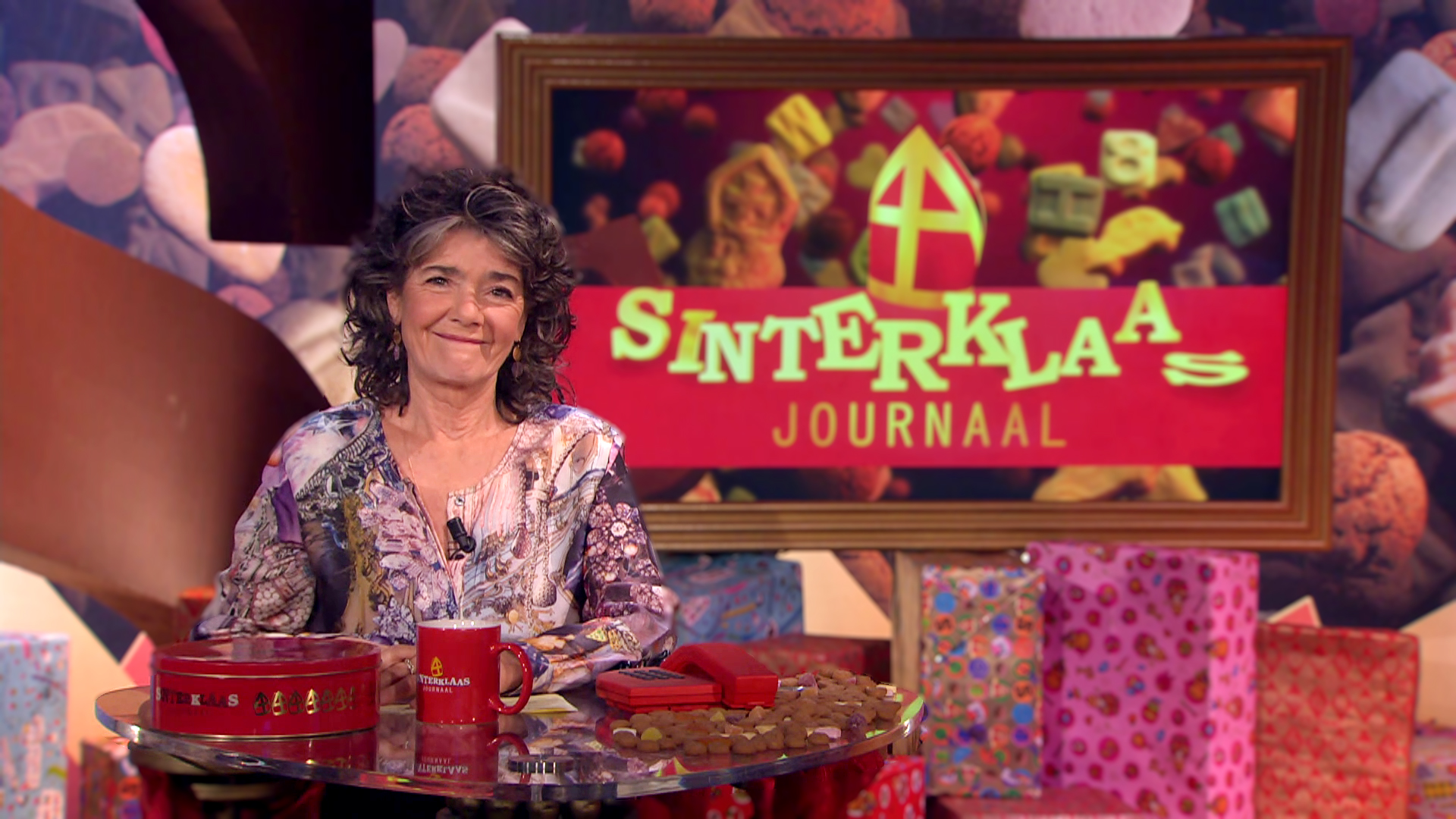
- Presenter Dieuwertje Blok presents Het Sinterklaasjournaal (2020).
- Genre: Children
- Created by: Ajé Boschhuizen
- Written by: Ajé Boschhuizen
- Presented by: Merel Westrik (2024–present); Jeroen Kramer (2005−present); Stephanie van Eer (2025−present); Dieuwertje Blok (2001–2023)
- Starring: Gijs Naber (2026−present); Niels van der Laan (2018−present)
- Voices of: Herman van der Zandt
- Country of origin: Netherlands
- Original language: Dutch
- No. of seasons: 25

Production
- Production companies: NTR (2010–present); NPS (2001–2009); KRO (2001); TROS (2001); Teleac/NOT (2001); VPRO (2001)

Original release
- Network: Z@ppelin
- Release: 14 November 2001 – 4 December 2012
- Network: NPO Zapp
- Release: 11 November 2013 – present

Het Sinterklaasjournaal is a Dutch children's television series that has been broadcast every year since 2001 during the Sinterklaas period. The program is a fictional, children news program, in which the adventures of Sinterklaas and his Petes during their stay in the Netherlands are told. The program has been broadcast on the children's channel NPO Zapp since 2001.

== History ==
=== Origin ===
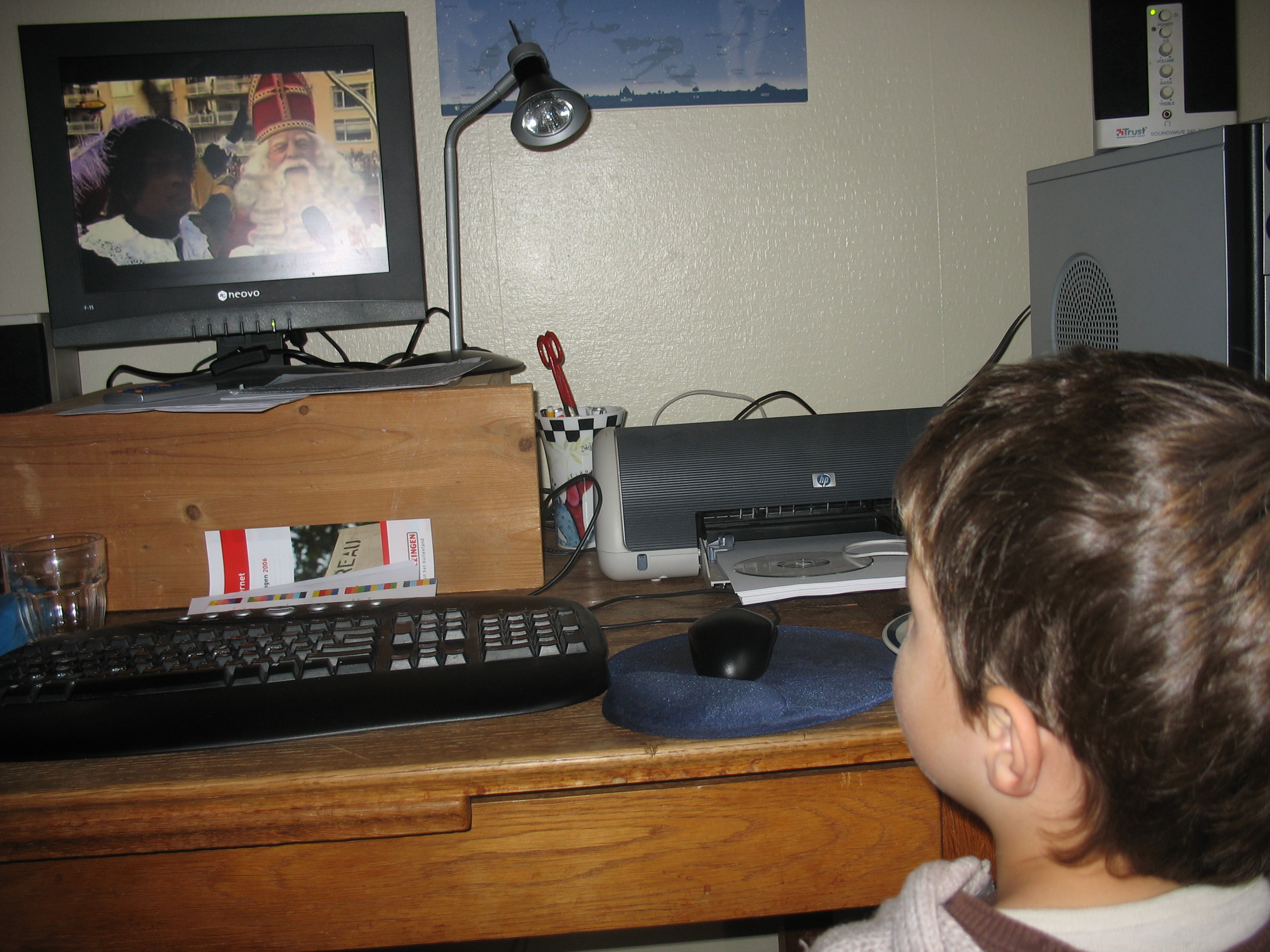
Child watches the national arrival of Sinterklaas, broadcast by Het Sinterklaasjournaal (2006).

In the summer of 2001, Ajé Boschhuizen, who was the editor-in-chief of the Dutch version of Sesame Street, came up with a new children's program for the Sinterklaas period. The format of the program was a fictional news program, in which the adventures of Sinterklaas and his helpers during their stay in the Netherlands are reported every day. Boschhuizen's idea was found to be very interesting and was later approved to produce the program. The public broadcasters KRO, NPS, TROS, Teleac/NOT and VPRO then decided to jointly produce the program.

On November 14, 2001, the first broadcast of Het Sinterklaasjournaal was broadcast. Later, it was decided to have the program return annually. However, the broadcasters KRO, TROS, Teleac/NOT and VPRO dropped out, making the NPS the sole producer of the program. Later, the NPS, together with the broadcasters Teleac and RVU, merged into the broadcaster NTR, which has been producing the program since 2010.

=== Black Pete discussion ===
The program was in dire straits from 2014 to 2019. This was due to the heated debate in the Netherlands about the figure of Black Pete. The program was often the target during the debate, because the program still contained Black Petes. In 2014, the program began the process of gradually changing Black Pete to Chimney Pete, the alternative to Black Pete (in the original Sinterklaas legend as it is told in the Netherlands, Pete's black colour comes from the soot of a chimney he has to climb through to deliver presents). As a result, in addition to Black Petes, Het Sinterklaasjournaal in 2014 also contained differently colored Petes. From 2017 to 2018, the children's program featured both Black Petes and Chimney Petes. Since 2019, Black Pete has completely disappeared from the program and only Chimney Petes are still in it.

The debate hit the program hard. For example, Dutch actor Erik van Muiswinkel, who played the role of Hoofdpiet in the program, decided to leave the program because, according to him, ‘‘the NTR did not want any other kind of Pete’’. Dolores Leeuwin, a woman of colour who played the role of reporter in the program, also left the program. Presenter Dieuwertje Blok, who has been presenting the program since the first season, spoke out against Black Pete in an interview with the Dutch newspaper Trouw. After this, it became unclear whether Dieuwertje Blok would also leave the program. In the end, Blok remained the presenter of Het Sinterklaasjournaal.

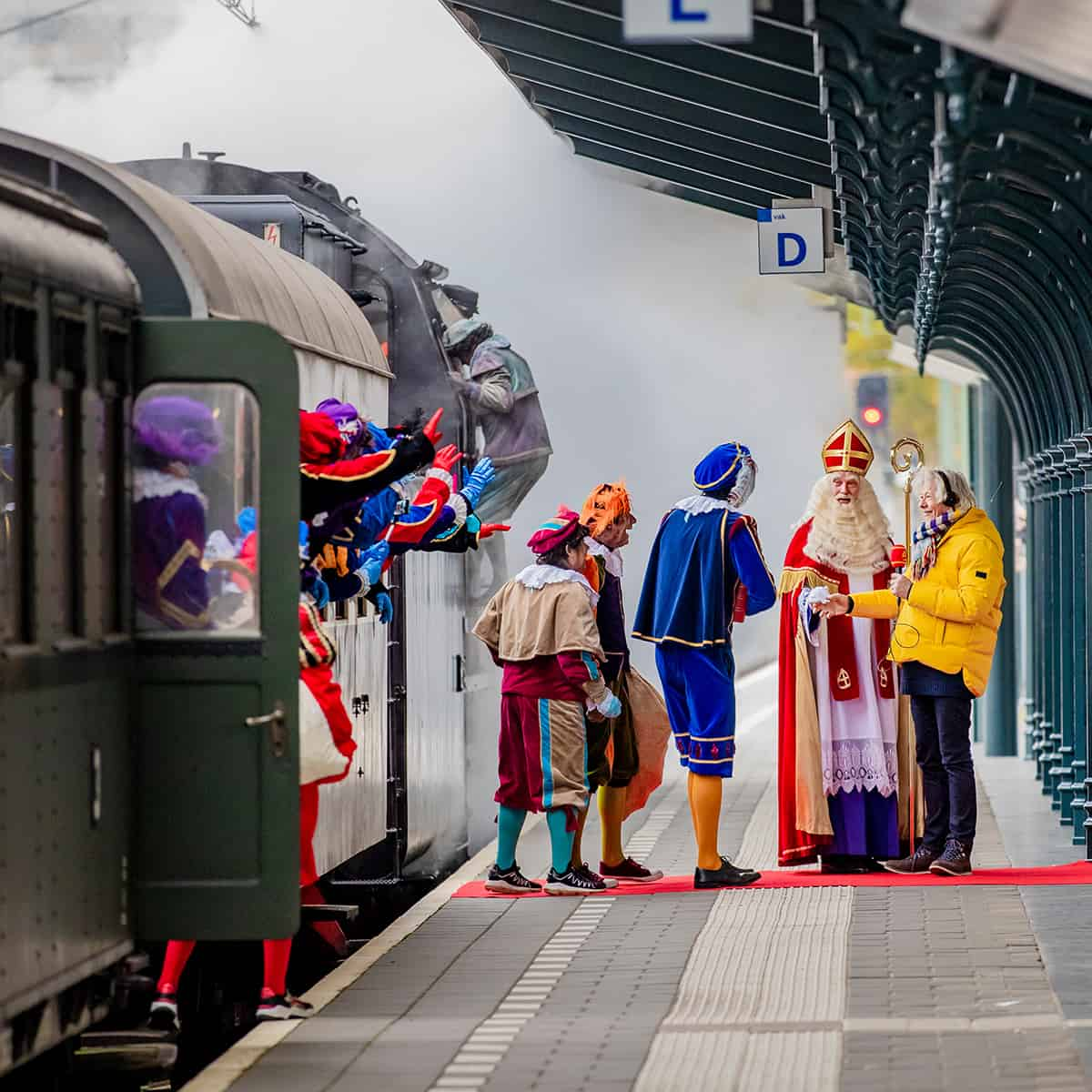
Sinterklaas arrives in Apeldoorn, the Netherlands, without Black Petes (2019).

=== Present ===
In 2020, Het Sinterklaasjournaal has received a lot of positive reviews. During the corona pandemic, national events were not allowed to be organized. The program then managed to creatively continue the national arrival of Sinterklaas by recording the arrival in advance and receiving Sinterklaas in the fictional town of Zwalk.

In later editions, the program received positive reactions because of their references to current affairs. For example, in 2021, the character Luisterpiet was given a 'function elsewhere', referring to the Dutch cabinet formation of 2021. In 2022, the Petes had the Dutch flag upside down, referring to the Dutch farmers' protests. In 2026, Niels van der Laan (playing Hoofdpiet) imitated Donald Trump, suggesting an extension of the 'Pietenhuis' (where the Petes store all the presents) to build a large ballroom, referring to Trump's plan to do the same with the White House.

In 2024, it was announced that presenter Dieuwertje Blok would temporarily disappear from public view because her nose had to be amputated due to skin cancer. As a result, she was unable to present the 24th season of Het Sinterklaasjournaal. In 2024, Merel Westrik would therefore temporarily present the program. Later the cancer returned, and as a result Dieuwertje Blok died March 2, 2025.

The show won the Machiavelliprijs 2025 for its contributions to public communication and its role in building connection in Dutch society. Merel Westrik and Jeroen Kramer received the award at the award ceremony in April 2026.

== Format ==
Television promo of Het Sinterklaasjournaal (2015).

Het Sinterklaasjournaal starts five days before the national arrival of Sinterklaas which is usually mid-November. In the first week, the town of arrival plays a central role in the storyline. In the days that follow, there will be a daily report on what Sinterklaas and his Petes are up to in the Netherlands. A weekly overview is broadcast every Sunday. The last broadcast is the day before 'Pakjesavond', the birthday of Sinterklaas.

Each season of Het Sinterklaasjournaal the storylines are usually full of problems and setbacks for the Petes, Sinterklaas himself or for all Dutch children. For example, sometimes all the children's wish lists have disappeared, Sinterklaas' horse is missing or there is not enough candy for the children. Fortunately, at the end of each season, everything turns out fine and the Sinterklaas celebration can still go ahead.

The program contains the following sections: Each episode covers three main topics. It is often about the big news of the day. Then the short news is covered, and finally the program ends with the 'Pete Weather Report', to tell Sinterklaas' Petes what the weather will be like when they go up on the roofs at night to deliver presents through the chimney.

== Cast ==
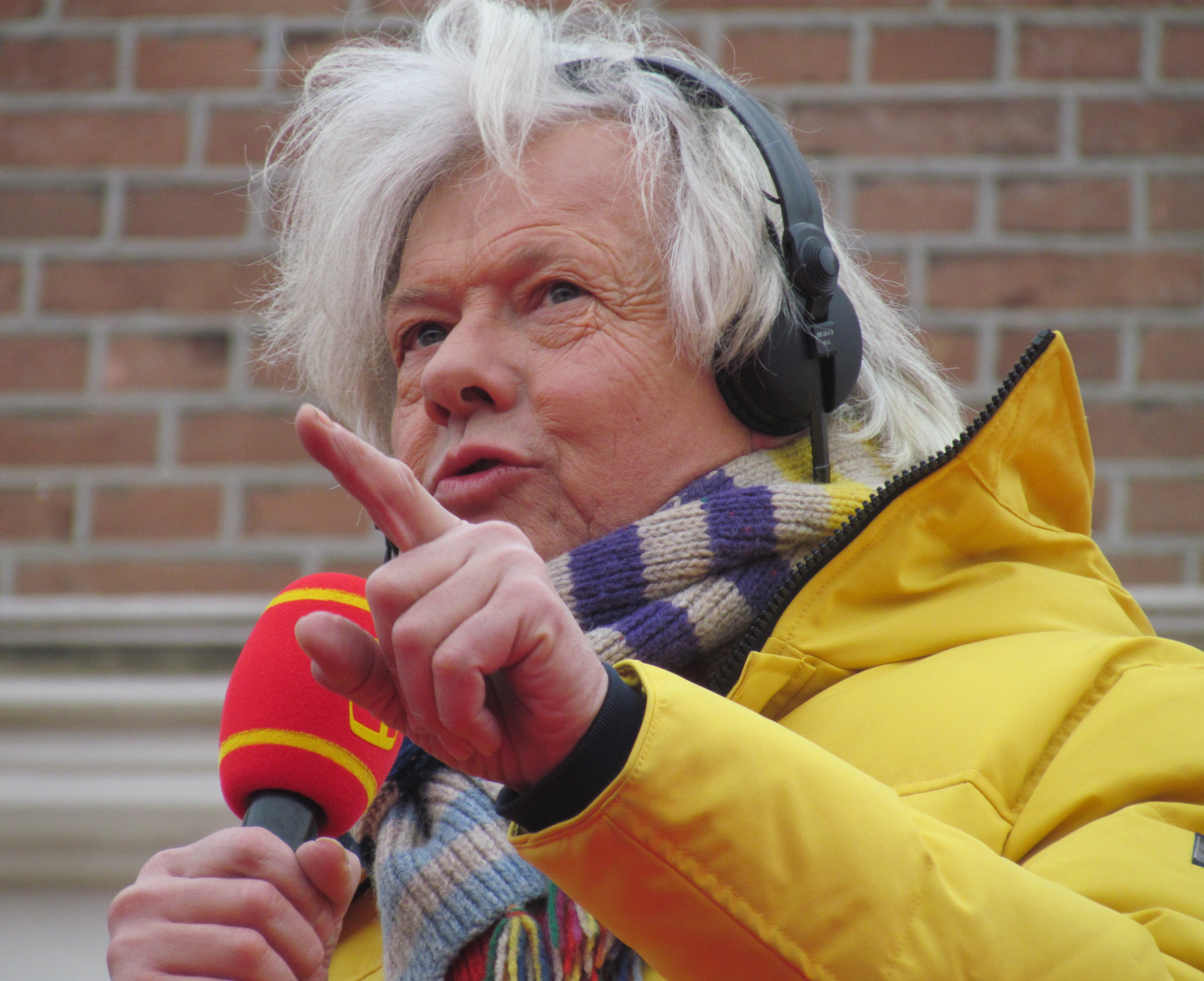
Jeroen Kramer has been a 'reporter' for Het Sinterklaasjournaal since 2005.

Overview of the current cast of Het Sinterklaasjournaal:

Presentation and reporting
Role	Name	Period
Presenter	Merel Westrik	2024–present
Reporter	Jeroen Kramer	2005−present
Reporter	Stephanie van Eer	2025−present
Voice-over	Herman van der Zandt	2022−present
Sinterklaas and his Petes
Role	Actor	Period
Sinterklaas	Gijs Naber	2026–present
Hoofdpiet	Niels van der Laan	2018–present
Wellespiet	Dick van den Toorn	2001–present
Boekpiet (2008−2011: Piet)	Marc Nochem	2008–present
Reservepiet (2008−2011: Piet, 2014: Clowntjespiet, 2016: Pietje Pim)	Pim Muda	2008–present
Pietje Paniek	Jochem Myjer	2009–2010, 2012-2015, 2025–present
Proefpiet (2009−2010 and 2014: Strooipiet, 2016−2017: Vlogpiet)	Leon van der Zanden	2009–2010, 2014, 2016–present
Malle Pietje (2009 and 2011: Piet)	Owen Schumacher	2009, 2011, 2017–present
Vergeetpiet (2017: Hulpsinterklaas)	John Jones	2010–present
Verdwaalpiet (Nieuwe Piet in 2018)	Mingus Dagelet	2018–present
Piet de Smeerpoets	Han Oldigs	2019–present
Slimpiet	Jeske van de Staak	2022, 2024–present
Pietje	Sara Afiba	2024−present
Pieterman	Frank Groothof	2026–present

Former presenter: Dieuwertje Blok (2001−2023)

Former reporters:

- Aart Staartjes (1982−1983, 1985−2001 (Note: Staartjes served as a reporter for the national arrival of Sinterklaas before it became part of each season of Het Sinterklaasjournaal in 2001.))
- Rik Hoogendoorn (2002−2006)
- Lot Lohr (2002)
- Aldith Hunkar (2002)
- Wouke van Scherrenburg (2003)
- Klaas van der Eerden (2003)
- Sipke Jan Bousema (2003)
- Dolores Leeuwin (2004, 2012−2015)
- Martijn Krabbé (2006)
- Lex Uiting (2016)
- Charlie Chan Dagelet (2017)
- Fenna Ramos (2018)
- Rachel Rosier (2019−2024)

Former voice-overs: Kees Driehuis (2001−2017), Reinier van den Hout (2018−2022)

Former actors with main roles:
- Bram van der Vlugt (Sinterklaas, 2001−2010)
- Stefan de Walle (Sinterklaas, 2011−2025)
- Erik van Muiswinkel (2001−2015)
- Harry Piekema (2017)
- Maarten Wansink (2001−2018)
- Michiel Kerbosch (2001−2005)
- Anne Rats (2001–2007, 2009)
- Georgina Verbaan (2001)
- Bob Fosko (2002–2017, 2019)
- Rob Kamphues (2003–2010, 2012)
- Marc-Marie Huijbregts (2003–2010)
- Joep Onderlinden (2008–2017, 2020–2022)
- Peter Lusse (2008–2012)
- Jeroen Spitzenberger (2009, 2017, 2020–2025)
- Kasper van Kooten (2009)
- Friso van Vemde Oudejans (2011–2017)
- Joost Spijkers (2011–2016)
- Thomas van Luyn (2011)
- Valerio Zeno (2012)
- Peter Faber (2014–2015)
- Ronald Snijders (2014)
- Martijn Hillenius (2015–2016)
- Sarah Bannier (2015–2016, 2018–2019)
- Frans van Deursen (2016)
- Abel Nienhuis (2016)
- Frederik Brom (2017, 2019)
- Abbey Hoes (2017)
- Danny Westerweel (2018–2022)
- Desi van Doeveren (2018–2020)
- Minne Koole (2018)
- Rosa da Silva (2021, 2023–2025)
- Jade Olieberg (2021–2022)
- Bas Keijzer (2022)
- Rick Paul van Mulligen (2024)

== Film ==
Het Sinterklaasjournaal: De Meezing Moevie
- Theatrical release poster
- Directed by: Dennis Bots; Rita Horst; Ineke Houtman
- Written by: Ajé Boschhuizen
- Based on: Het Sinterklaasjournaal
- Produced by: Pieter Kuijpers; Sander van Meurs; Elwin Looije
- Cinematography: Erwin Roodhart
- Edited by: Ot Louw
- Music by: Het Paleis van Boem
- Production companies: Pupkin Film; NPS
- Distributed by: Independent Films
- Release dates: 14 October 2009 (Netherlands); 28 October 2009 (Belgium)
- Running time: 65 minutes
- Country: Netherlands
- Language: Dutch
- Box office: $650,731

In 2009, the film Het Sinterklaasjournaal: De Meezing Moevie premiered. The cinema film is based on Het Sinterklaasjournaal. In the film, Sinterklaas and his Petes are on their way to the Netherlands, but get caught in a storm. As a result, they no longer know where the Netherlands is and which way to sail. In the film, the audience is called upon to help Sinterklaas by singing Sinterklaas songs. The lyrics are shown on screen for this purpose. By singing along to the songs, Sinterklaas and the helpers manage to reach the Netherlands.

=== Cast ===
Overview of the cast of Het Sinterklaasjournaal: De Meezing Moevie:

Actor	Role
Bram van der Vlugt	Sinterklaas
Erik van Muiswinkel	Hoofdpiet
Maarten Wansink	Huispiet
Dick van den Toorn	Wellespiet
Rob Kamphues	Rare Piet
Bob Fosko	Pietje Precies
Peter Lusse	Ballonnenpiet
Anne Rats	Paardenpiet Glenn
Dieuwertje Blok	Presenter
Jeroen Kramer	Reporter
Viggo Waas	Chimney sweep
Peter Heerschop	Resident of house with chimney
Dries Roelvink	Construction worker
Dick Lam	Titus Tillema
Ferry de Groot	Willem Grol
Stefan de Walle	Jan Boerefluitjes
Bas Hoeflaak	POD Klaas
Peter van de Witte	POD Piet
François Boulangé	Baker Boulanger
Kees Driehuis	Voiceover

== Commotion ==
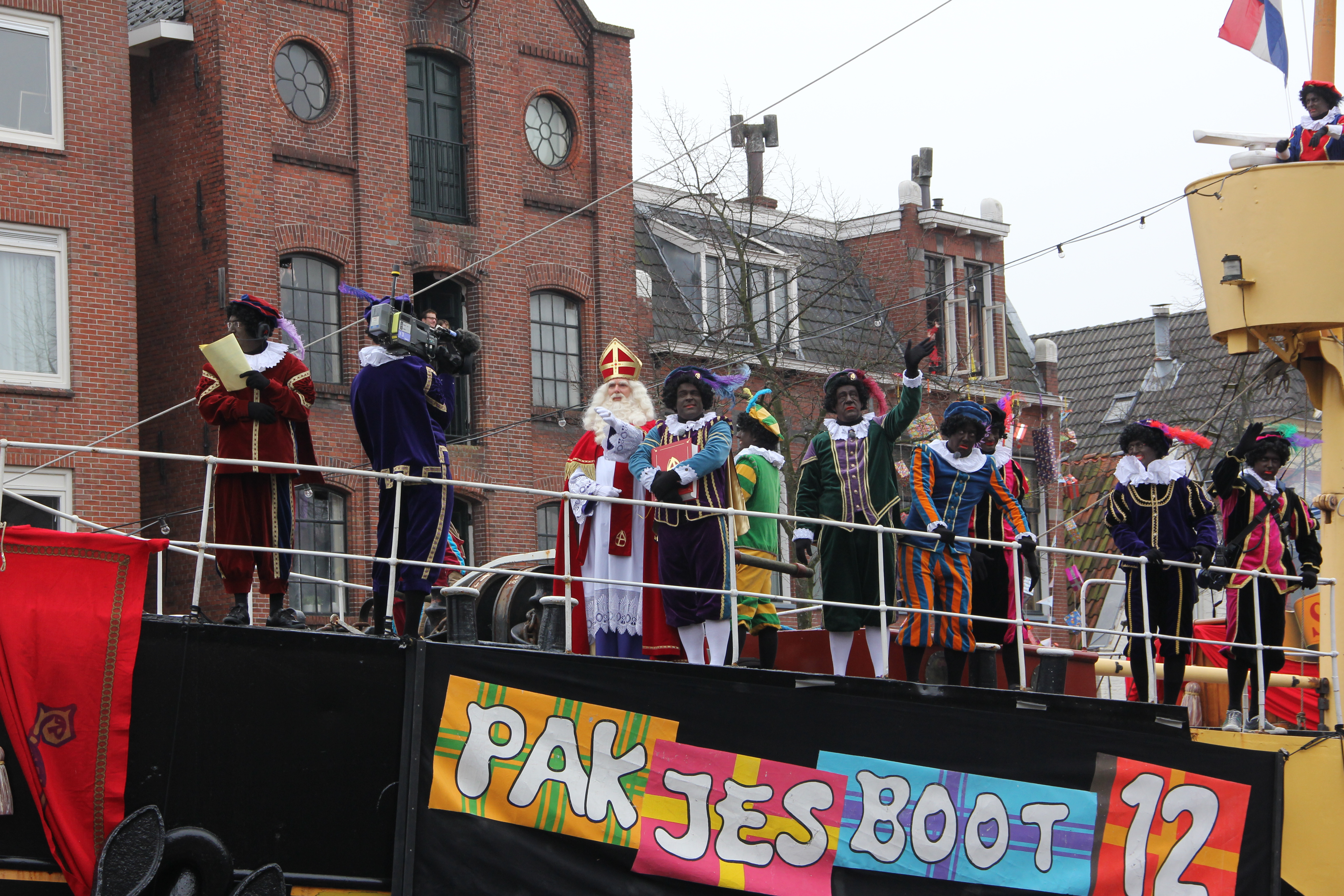
National arrival of Sinterklaas in Groningen (2013).

In 2006, there was a stir about the program, because in addition to Black Petes, the broadcasts also featured other coloured Petes. In the program, the steamboat sailed through a rainbow, which meant that half of the Petes were of a different colour. Many people reacted angrily to the coloured Petes. A year later, only Black Petes were still visible.

In 2015, complaints were received following the first broadcast of Het Sinterklaasjournaal that year. The first episode reported on the city of Meppel, the place where Sinterklaas arrived that year. The report featured the character city historian 'Kort van Memorie' who talked about the Drenthe folk legend 'Witte Wieven'. After the broadcast, many parents complained that the program frightens children. Many reformed Christian schools also decided to stop broadcasting the program, because the schools considered the storyline to be 'witchcraft'.

In the same year, the broadcaster NTR was fined by the Commissariat for the Media, the government agency that supervises media law, because the program advertised its own Sinterklaasjournaal wrapping paper in 2013. In the Netherlands, it is not permitted to advertise on public broadcasting. Broadcaster NTR had to pay the fine of 150,000 euros, because the wrapping paper was regularly seen in the broadcasts.

In 2020, Sinterklaas would arrive in a place called “Kruisigem”, which was interpreted as a corruption of ‘'kruisig hem” (English: crucify him), the cry that, according to the Bible, was shouted at the crucifixion of Jesus Christ. This was found offensive by many Christians, after which broadcaster NTR responded that it was not the intention for people to be hurt by this.

In 2022, parents complained after a broadcast of the program in which Sinterklaas' steamboat had sunk. This led to great shock among the children who watched the episode. The broadcaster then posted a message in which they promised to “trust that Sinterklaas will find a solution to all problems this time too”. This turned out to be a private plane, with which Sinterklaas flew to the Netherlands with the packages and his Petes. At the airport, he was offered a replacement boat with which he could continue the journey to Hellevoetsluis, the place where the arrival was held that year. Later, there was criticism because Sinterklaas came by plane and therefore 'did not travel climate-neutrally'. Broadcaster NTR later responded that ”not a drop of kerosene” was used in Sinterklaas' plane.

== Prizes ==
In 2013, Het Sinterklaasjournaal won the Gouden Stuiver, the award for the best children's program. In 2021, Het Sinterklaasjournaal won the Ere Zilveren Nipkowschijf. In 2022, the program won the Zapp Award for favorite children's program.

== See also ==
- Sinterklaas
- Saint Nicholas (European folklore)
- Zwarte Piet
- Television in the Netherlands
- Culture of the Netherlands
