= Erik Dijkstra =

Dutch journalist (born 1977)

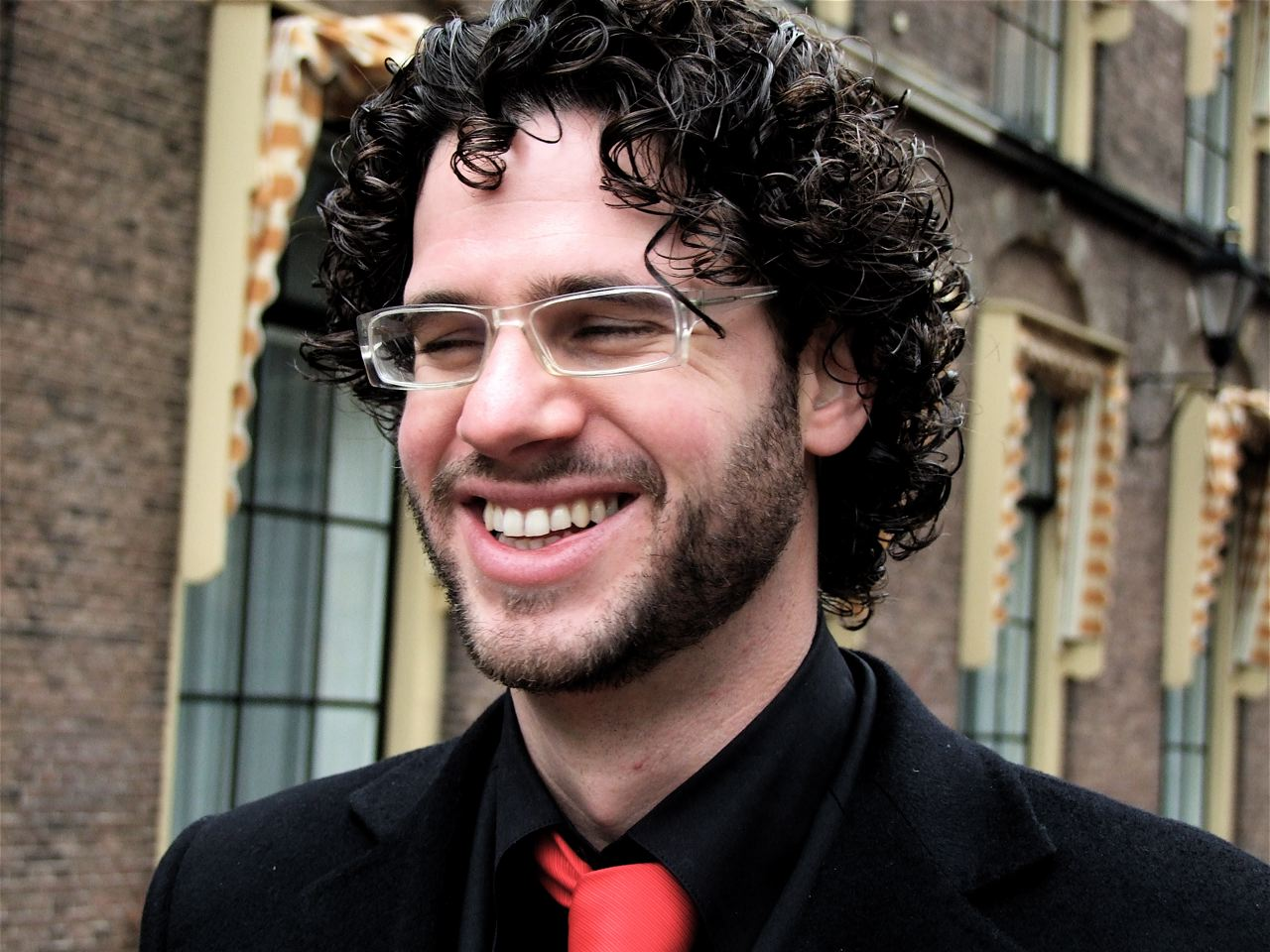
- Erik Dijkstra (2008)
- Born: 9 March 1977 (age 49); Glanerbrug, Netherlands (Note: Some sources report Losser, Netherlands as his birth place.)
- Known for: De Jakhalzen; Per Seconde Wijzer

Erik Dijkstra (born 9 March 1977) is a Dutch journalist and television presenter. He is known as presenter of the quiz show Per Seconde Wijzer and for the segment De Jakhalzen in the talk show De Wereld Draait Door. He was also one of the presenters of the talk show Op1.

== Career ==
Dijkstra worked as cameraman at RTV Noord-Holland.

Dijkstra is known for his role as Jakhals Erik in the recurring segment De Jakhalzen in the early-evening talk show De Wereld Draait Door. In 2011, he was the narrator in the inaugural edition of The Passion, a Dutch Passion Play held on Maundy Thursday. He finished in second place in the 2014 season of the quiz show De slimste mens. In 2018, he succeeded Kees Driehuis as presenter of the quiz show Per Seconde Wijzer. Dijkstra presented the television show Roofkunst in which he looks at stolen artworks that are part of collections of European museums.

In 2020, Dijkstra was one of the presenters of the talk show Op1. He presented the show together with Willemijn Veenhoven. He played a small role in the 2020 film The Marriage Escape directed by Johan Nijenhuis. He was also one of the presenters of Op1 in the summer of 2021. He presented the show together with Natasja Gibbs.

He presented the 2026 television show Goed Verhaal, a show about stories.

== Writing ==
He published the book Hoe sterk is de eenzame schaatser in 2015 about the life of Dutch speed skater Hans van Helden.

In 2021, Dijkstra won the Nico Scheepmaker Beker, an award given for the best sports book of the previous year. He won the award for his book Ali was mijn vriend, a book about the friendship between photographer Guus Dubbelman and boxer Muhammad Ali.

== Personal life ==
Dijkstra studied history at the University of Groningen in Groningen, Netherlands.
