= Omroep Max =

Dutch public broadcaster

- Type: Public broadcasting association
- Branding: Senior-oriented
- Country: Netherlands
- First air date: 3 September 2005
- Founded: 2002; 24 years ago
- Motto: Samen Max (lit. 'Together Max')
- Key people: Jan Slagter
- Official website: Official website

Omroep Max, commonly shortened to Max (stylised in all caps), is a public broadcaster within the Dutch public broadcasting system, aimed at viewers over the age of fifty. It was founded in late 2002 by Jan Slagter and began broadcasting on 3 September 2005 on both radio and television. Since 2021, it has been the largest public broadcaster in the Netherlands by number of members.

== History ==
Jan Slagter founded Omroep Max in 2002, because he felt that radio and television paid too little attention to older audiences. The first radio and TV broadcasts took place on 3 September 2005. Early programmes included Easy Listening on Radio 2 and the TV shows Van Nul naar Max and Super Senioren. The broadcaster later achieved success with programmes such as the talk show Tijd voor Max, previously known as Max & Catherine and Max & Loretta. Other well-known titles include Bed & Breakfast (the Dutch version of Four in a Bed) and Heel Holland Bakt (the Dutch version of The Great British Bake-Off).

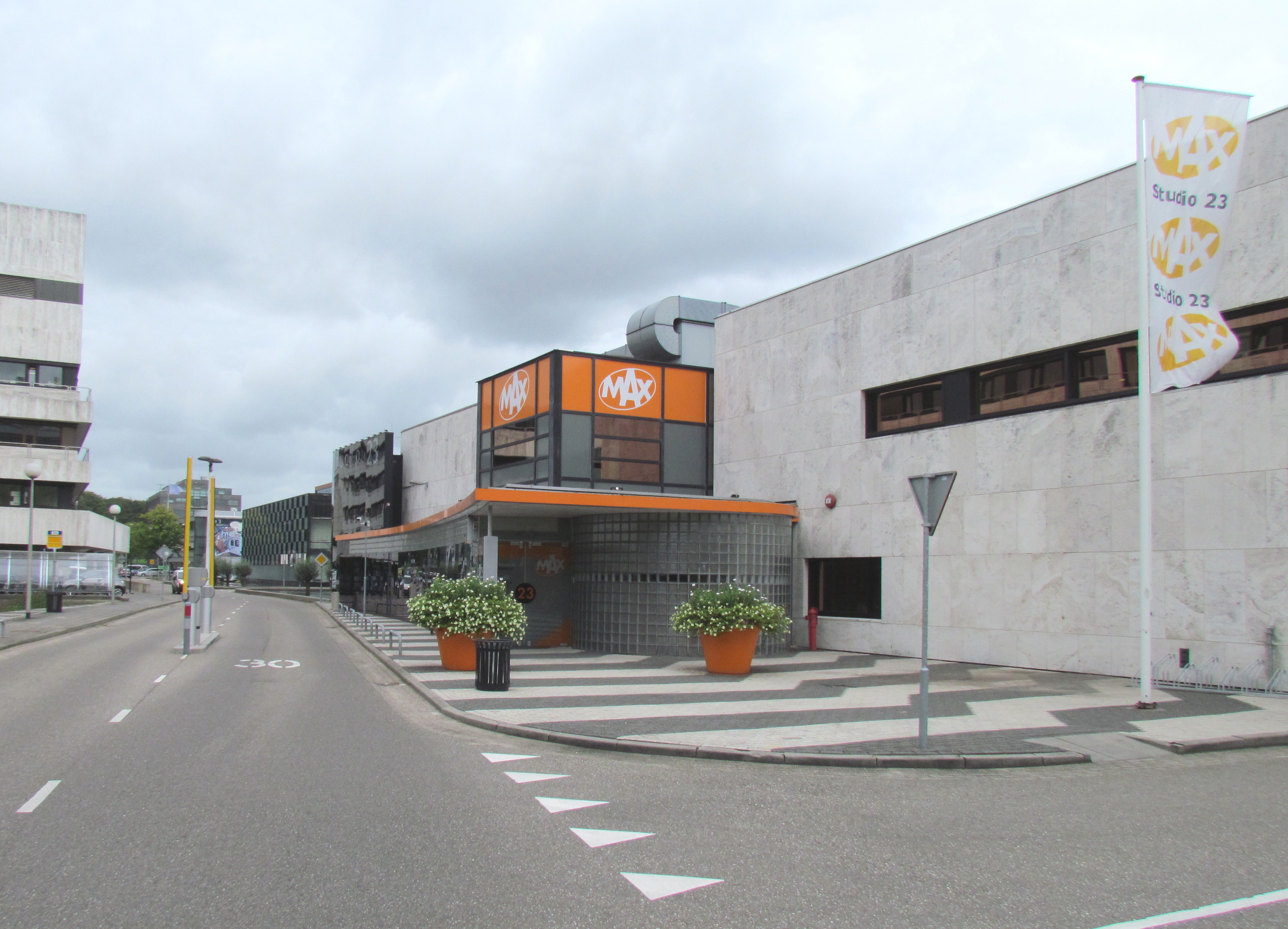
Studio 23 in Hilversum, used by Omroep Max

=== Membership ===
Omroep Max started in February 2004 with 62,000 members. By April 2009, it had surpassed the required 150,000 members and received permanent recognition within the public broadcasting system. Membership continued to grow: 345,685 members in 2014, 406,691 in 2021, and 430,000 in 2023, making it the largest public broadcaster in the Netherlands.

=== Name dispute with HBO Max ===
In 2023, the planned rebranding of HBO Max to "Max" was withdrawn in the Benelux after Omroep Max raised objections. The broadcaster noted that, while it does not oppose the use of "Max" in unrelated sectors, the fact that both organisations operate in the audiovisual domain could lead to confusion. Therefore, Warner Bros. Discovery decided to retain the HBO Max name in the region.

== Presenters ==
(Former) presenters of Omroep Max include:

- Martine Bijl
- André van Duin
- Catherine Keyl
- Joost Prinsen
- Loretta Schrijver
- Dionne Stax
- Herman van der Zandt

== Logo ==
On 15 December 2023, Omroep Max refreshed its logo after almost twenty years.

Logo until 2023

Logo since 2023

== See also ==
- 50Plus
