= Mark Verheijen =

Dutch politician (born 1976)

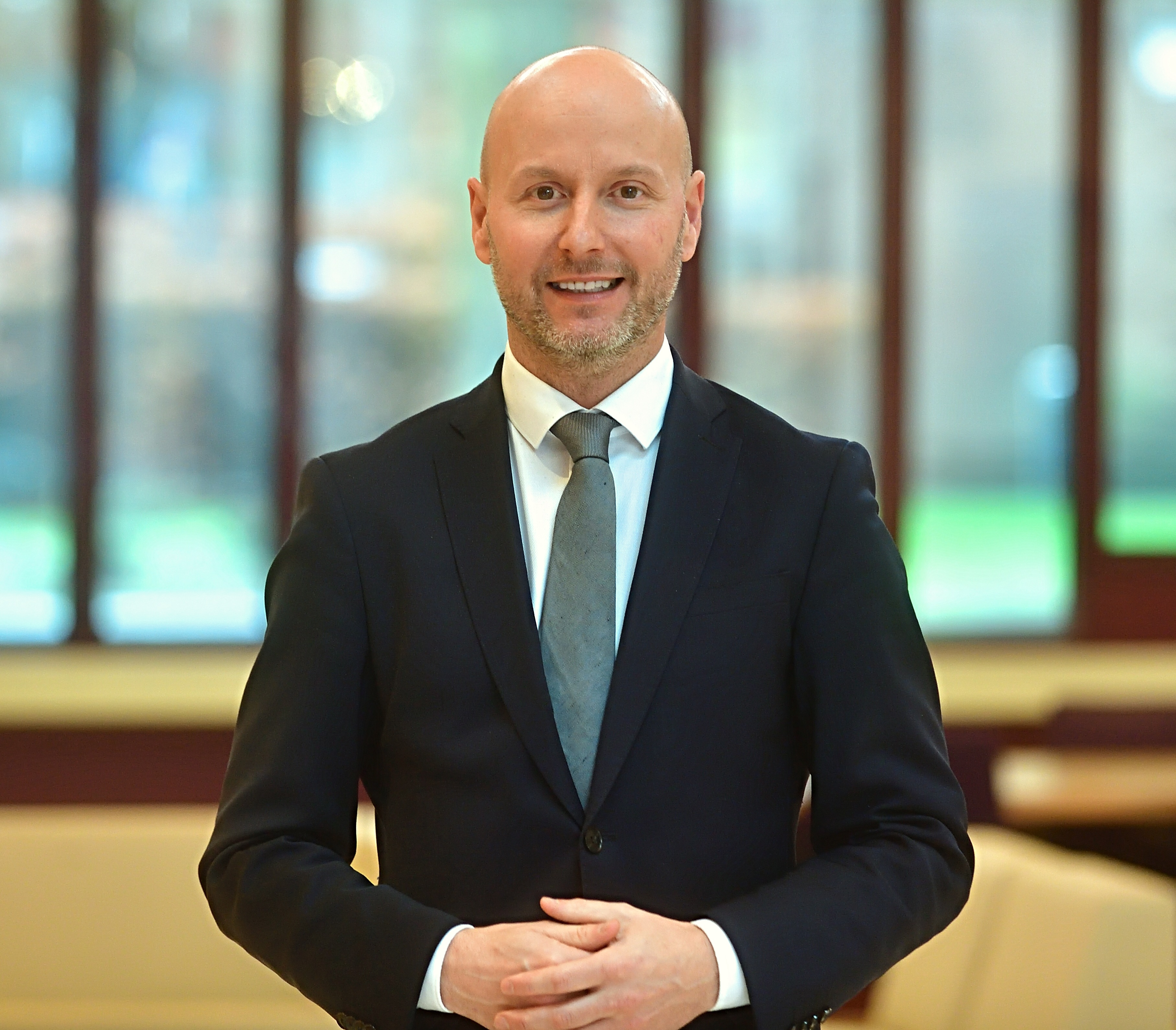
- Verheijen in 2023

Member of the House of Representatives
- In office 20 September 2012 – 27 February 2015
Acting mayoralties 2023‍–‍present
Acting Mayor of Wijdemeren
Incumbent
Assumed office 1 April 2024
Preceded by	Charlie Aptroot (acting)
Acting Mayor of Etten-Leur
In office 1 January 2023 – 25 September 2023
Preceded by	Miranda de Vries
Succeeded by	Marina Starmans

Member of the Provincial Executive of Limburg
- In office 25 May 2011 – September 2012

Member of the Provincial Council of Limburg
- In office 10 March 2010 – May 2011

Alderman in Venlo
- In office January 2006 – 25 May 2011

Member of the Venlo Municipal Council
- In office 1 January 2001 – January 2006; 29 March 2018 – 29 March 2022

Member of the Grubbenvorst Municipal Council
- In office 14 April 1998 – 31 December 2000

Personal details
- Born: Markus Leonardus Verheijen; 14 August 1976 (age 50) Baarlo, Netherlands
- Party: People's Party for Freedom and Democracy
- Education: Radboud University Nijmegen

Marcus Leonardus "Mark" Verheijen (Dutch: [ˈmɑr(ə)k fərˈɦɛiə(n)]; born 14 August 1976) is a Dutch politician of the conservative-liberal People's Party for Freedom and Democracy (VVD). He served in municipal and provincial politics in Limburg, and he was vice chairman of the VVD. He was a member of the House of Representatives from September 2012 until February 2015, when he resigned over an expense scandal.

== Early life and career ==
Verheijen was born on 14 August 1976 in Baarlo. He studied history at Radboud University Nijmegen between 1995 and 2000, and he sat on the board of the Youth Organisation Freedom and Democracy (JOVD), which is independent of the VVD. He became a member of the Grubbenvorst Municipal Council in April 1998, and he joined the Venlo Municipal Council after Grubbenvorst was dissolved as a municipality effective 2001. Verheijen worked simultaneously as a management consultant for Deloitte. He became an alderman in Venlo, responsible for economic affairs and finances, in January 2006, and he served as deputy mayor. He also sat on the Provincial Council of Limburg starting in March 2010. He resigned from his positions in May 2011 to join the province's executive, where he would stay for a year.

Nationally, Verheijen served as vice chairman of the VVD between April 2008 and May 2012, including as acting chairman between August 2010 and May 2012. He was sworn into the House of Representatives on 20 September 2012. He was his party's spokesperson for European affairs, and he was vice chair of the House's economic affairs committee. On 11 February 2025, NRC Handelsblad reported that Verheijen, while a member of the Provincial Executive of Limburg, had improperly declared personal, campaign, and party expenses for 2011 and 2012, in violation of the code of conduct and expense regulations of the province. He admitted some mistakes and said he would reimburse the province. Verheijen suspended his work in the House on 18 February following reports of a criminal complaint against him for bribery. The province ordered an external investigation into the former matter, which concluded checks for expenses were adequate and correctly applied. When a VVD commission concluded Verheijen's actions violated the party's ethical standards, he resigned from the House on 27 February 2015.

He subsequently worked as an independent consultant and as a columnist for Dagblad De Limburger, and he served another term on the Venlo Municipal Council between 2018 and 2022. In July 2020, during the re-election campaign of US president Donald Trump, a book by Verheijen was published called Wij kennen Amerika helemaal niet ('We don't know America at all'). He was acting mayor of Etten-Leur in 2023 and of Wijdemeren starting in 2024.
