= Grubbenvorst =

- Village
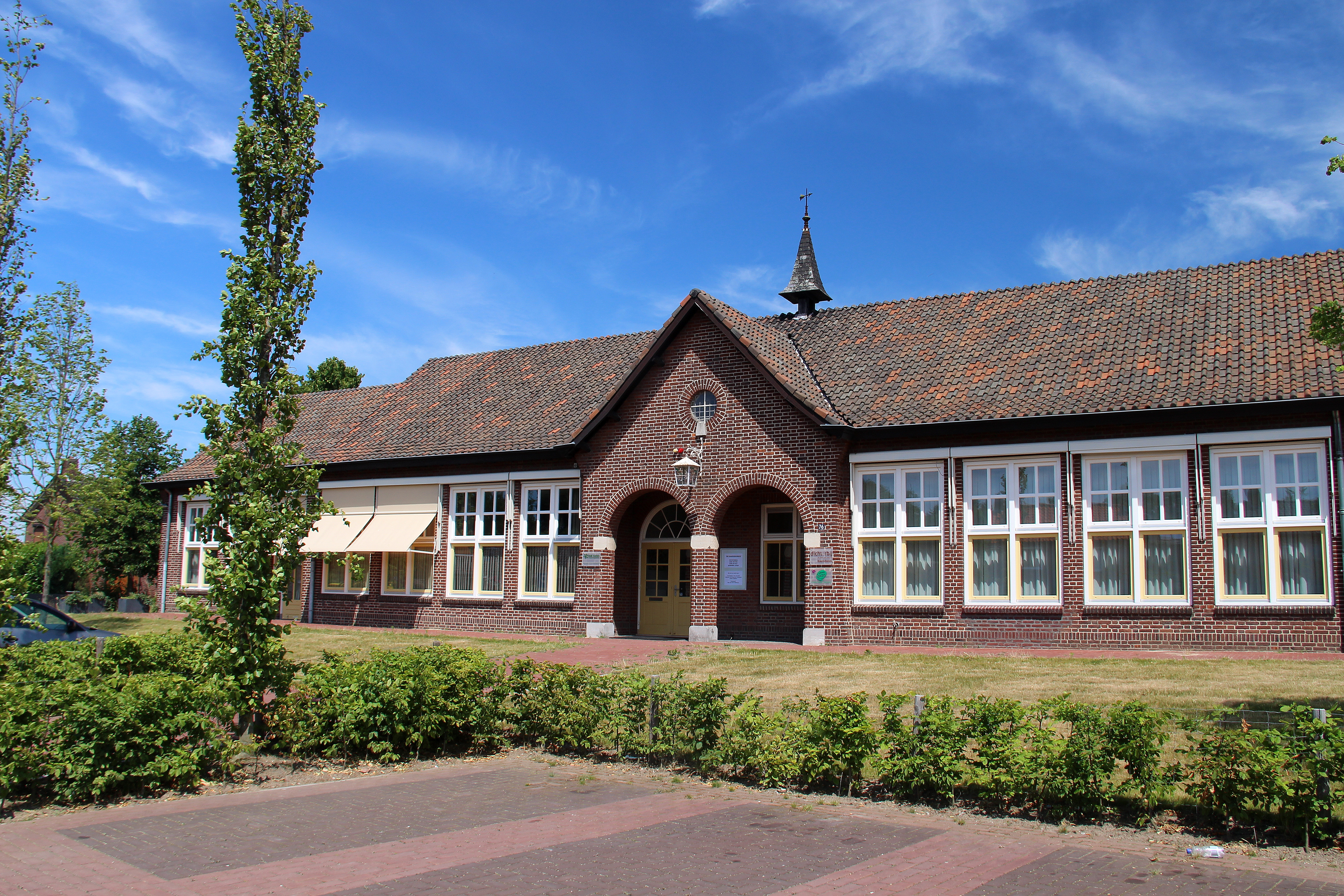
- School in Grubbenvorst

- Location in the Netherlands Location in the province of Limburg in the Netherlands
- Coordinates: 51°25′8″N 6°8′35″E
- Country: Netherlands
- Province: Limburg
- Municipality: Horst aan de Maas

Area
  - Total: 14.11 km^{2} (5.45 sq mi)
- Elevation: 24 m (79 ft)

Population (2021)
  - Total: 4,790
  - Density: 339/km^{2} (879/sq mi)
- Time zone: UTC+1 (CET)
  - Summer (DST): UTC+2 (CEST)
- Postal code: 5971
- Dialing code: 077
- Major roads: N555

Grubbenvorst (Limburgish: Grevors) is a village in the Dutch province of Limburg. It is located in the municipality of Horst aan de Maas, about 6 km northwest of Venlo.

== History ==
The village was first mentioned in 1207 as Vurste, and means "not fenced-off forest near Grubben Castle". Grubben has been added to distinguish from Broekhuizenvorst. Grubbenvorst developed on the Maas in the Early Middle Ages. It used to be part of the Land van Kessel. In 1323, it became part of the Duchy of Guelders. In 1648, it became part of the Spanish Netherlands. In 1713, it belonged to Prussia, and finally in 1815, it became part of the Kingdom of the Netherlands.

The village's Catholic Assumption of Mary Church is a three-aisled church with a wide tower which was constructed in 1951 and 1952, because the medieval church had been blown up in 1944. Grubbenvorst Castle is located on a hill near Grubbenvorst. It was built in 1311, and in the 15th century walls were added. The castle was destroyed in 1585. In 1623, a manor house was built near the ruins. The remains were blown up in 1944 and only two ruinous tower fragments remain.

Grubbenvorst was home to 219 people in 1840. It was a separate municipality until 2001, before being merged with Horst aan de Maas.

== Gallery ==
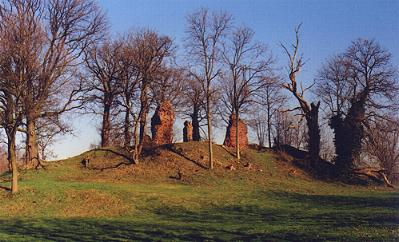
Ruin Het Gebroken Slot (The Broken Castle)

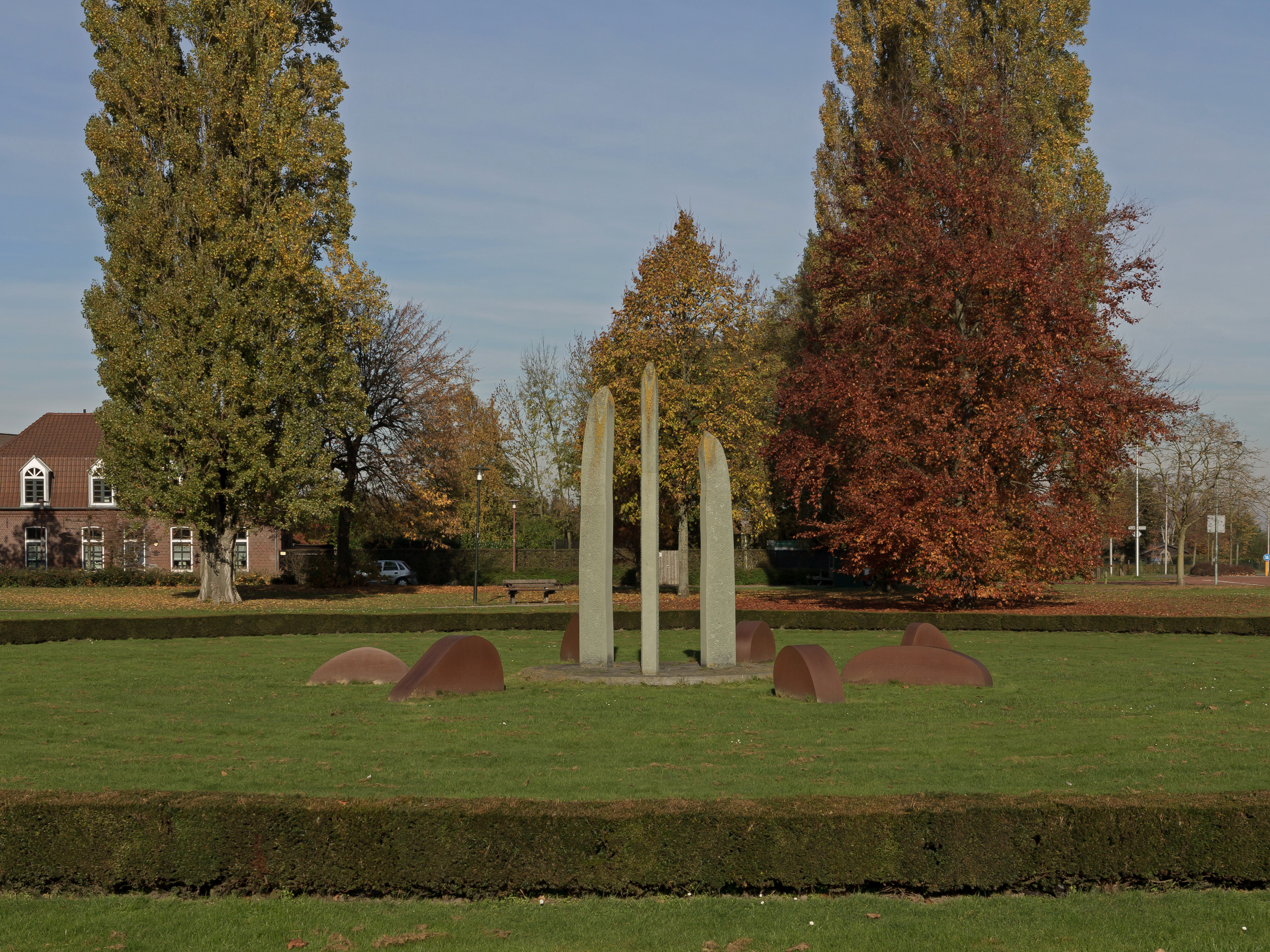
Sculpture near de Kloosterstraat

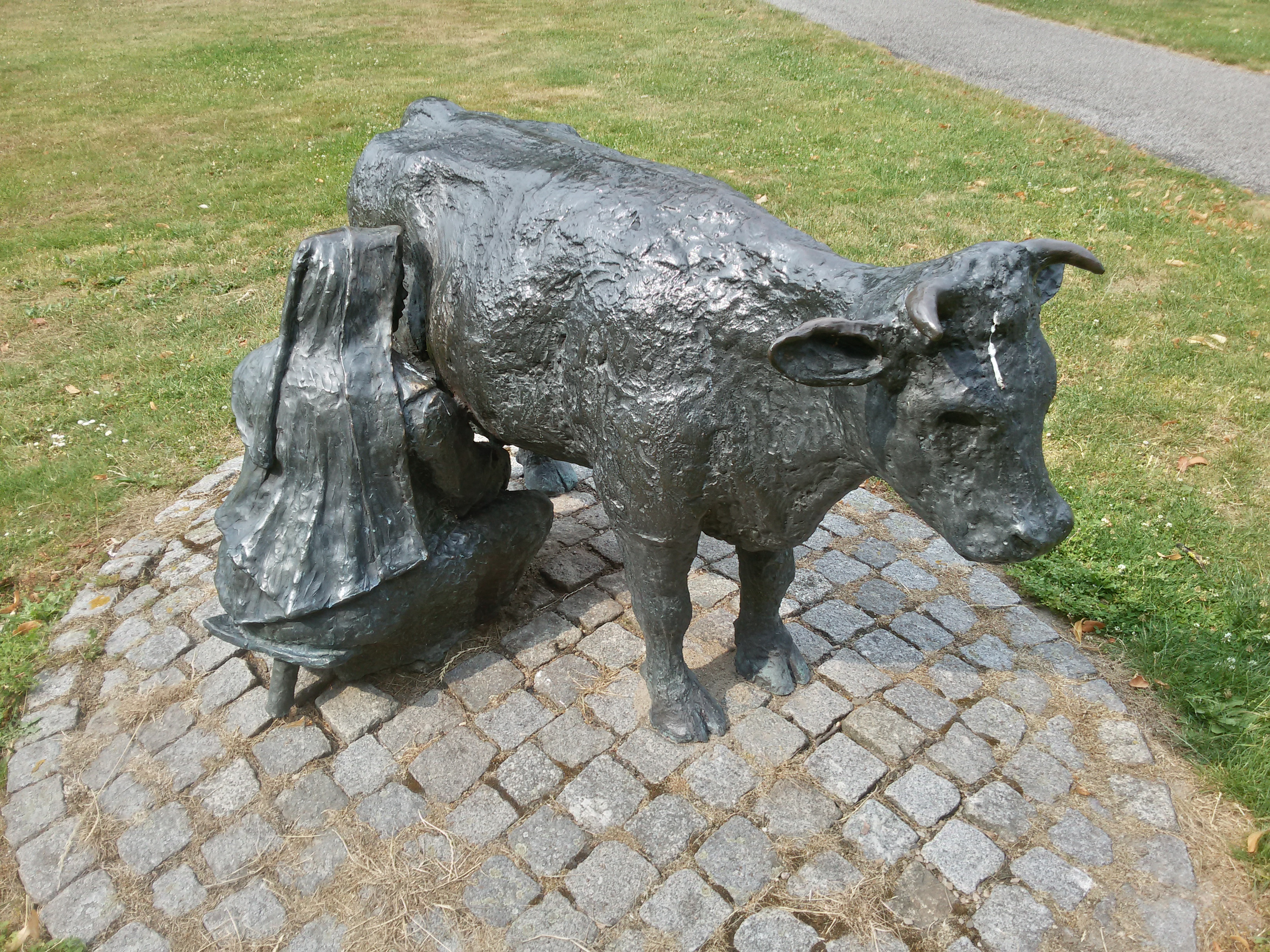
Milking nun statue

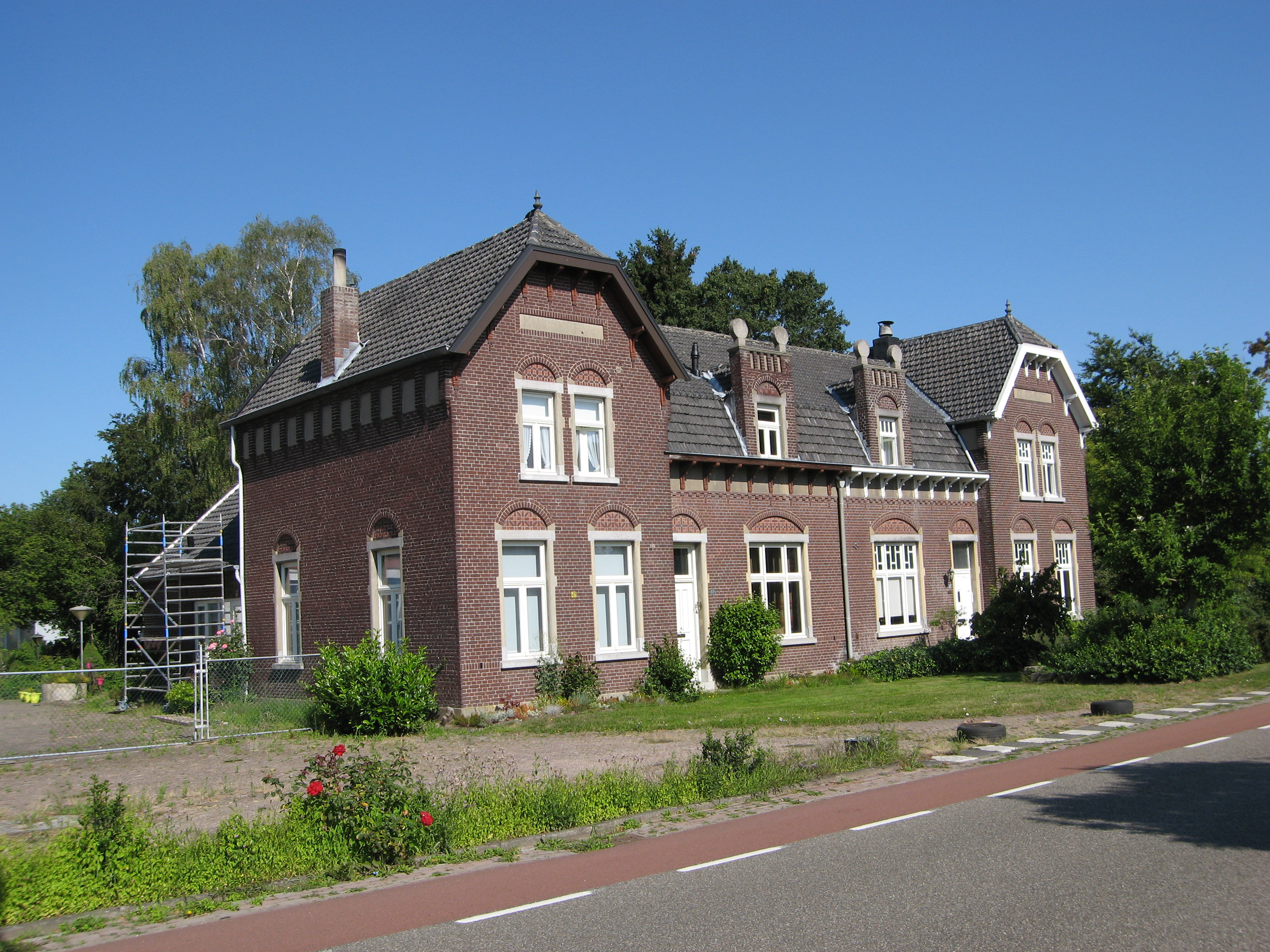
Houses in Grubbenvorst
