= Kees Driehuis =

Dutch television presenter (1951–2019)

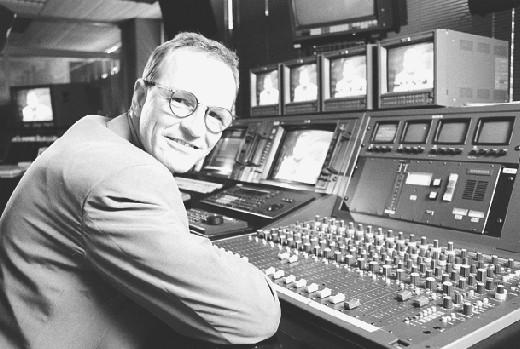
- Born: Cornelis Everardus Gerardus Driehuis; 8 December 1951; Amsterdam, Netherlands
- Died: 29 October 2019 (aged 67); Nederhorst den Berg, Netherlands
- Known for: Per Seconde Wijzer; Zembla; Nova; Buitenhof

Kees Driehuis (8 December 1951 – 29 October 2019) was a Dutch television presenter.

He was best known as the presenter for the television quiz show Per Seconde Wijzer for 29 years. In total, he presented 794 episodes of the quiz show. Driehuis presented the show for the last time on 1 March 2018. Erik Dijkstra succeeded him as presenter of the show.

He also presented the current affairs programme Nova and the Sunday midday political talkshow Buitenhof.

He was the narrator in many episodes of Het Sinterklaasjournaal.

He died on 29 October 2019 of bladder cancer at the age of 67.
