= Gemeentelijk Gymnasium Hilversum =

School in the Netherlands

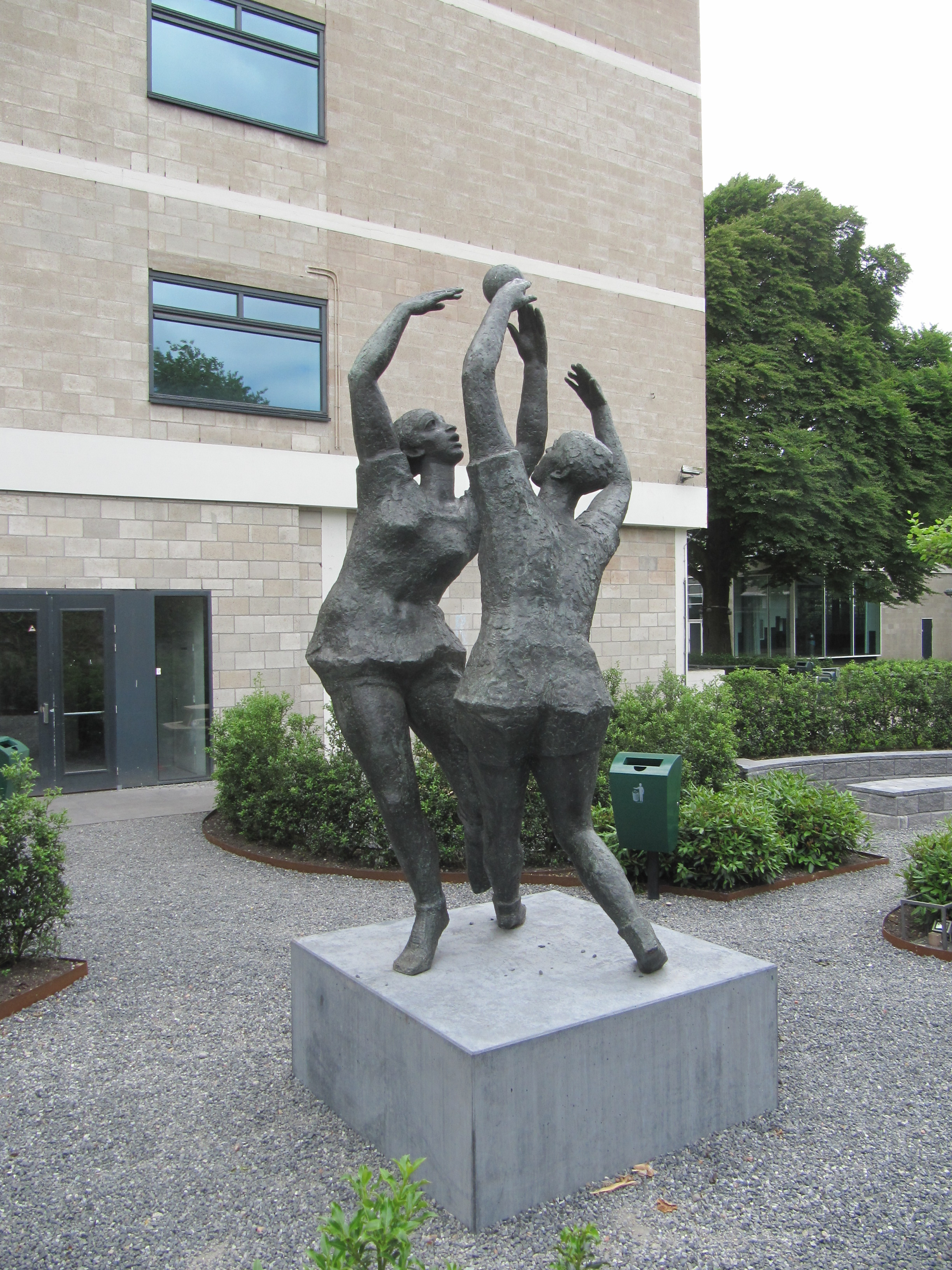

Location
- Hilversum, Netherlands; 52.223°N 5.164°E

Information
- Type: Public Gymnasium
- Motto: Virtus Quaerit Intellectum (Virtue Requires a Well-Informed Mind)
- Established: 1913
- Rector: Ilja Klink
- Website: www.gymnasiumhilversum.nl

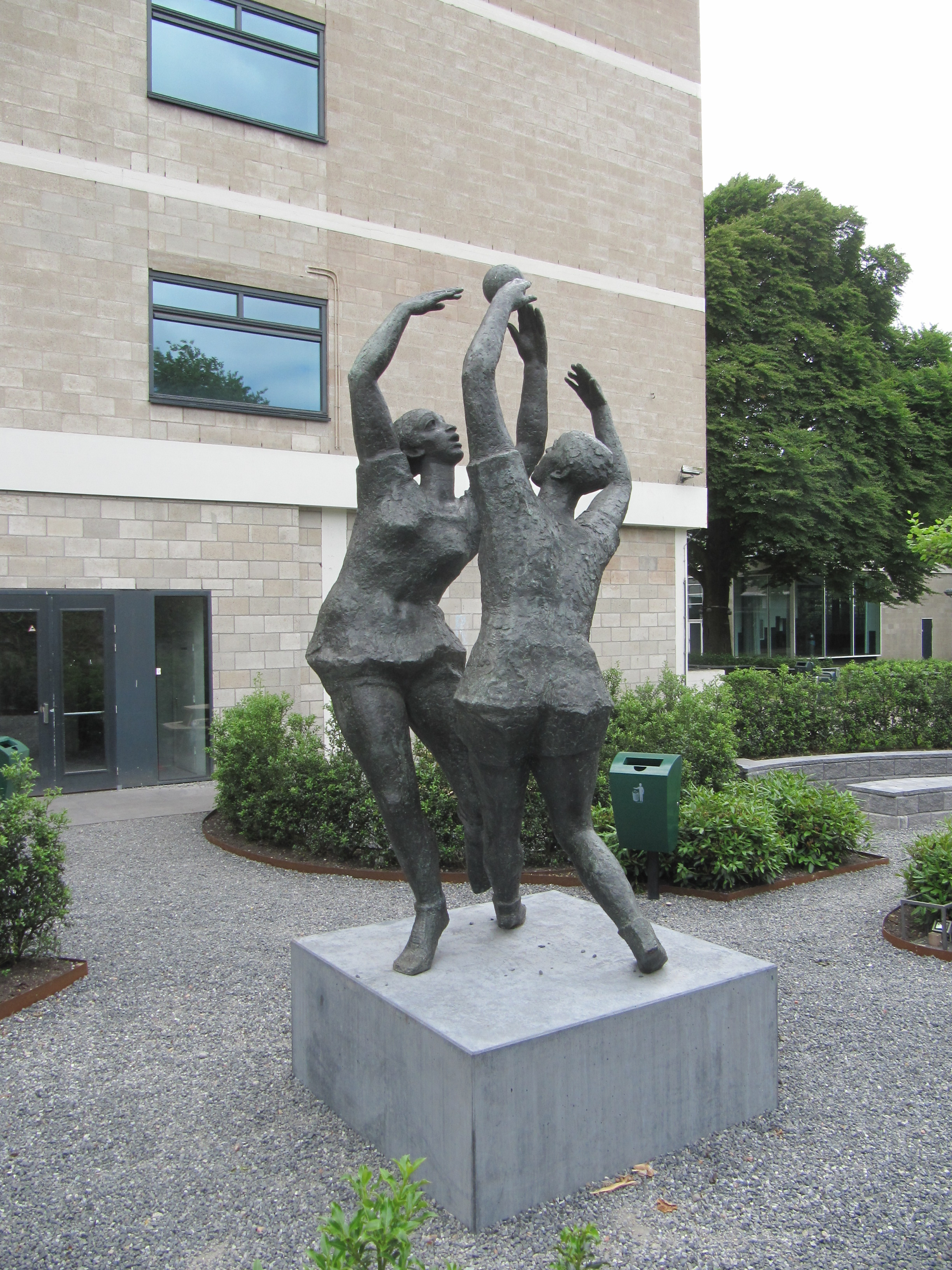
The Gemeentelijk Gymnasium Hilversum with the 1966 sculpture Sport en Spel by Pieter Starreveld

The Gemeentelijk Gymnasium is a secondary school in Hilversum, The Netherlands. It offers a classical curriculum, including studies in Latin and Greek. It was established in 1913.
