= Kefah Allush =

Dutch television presenter and producer

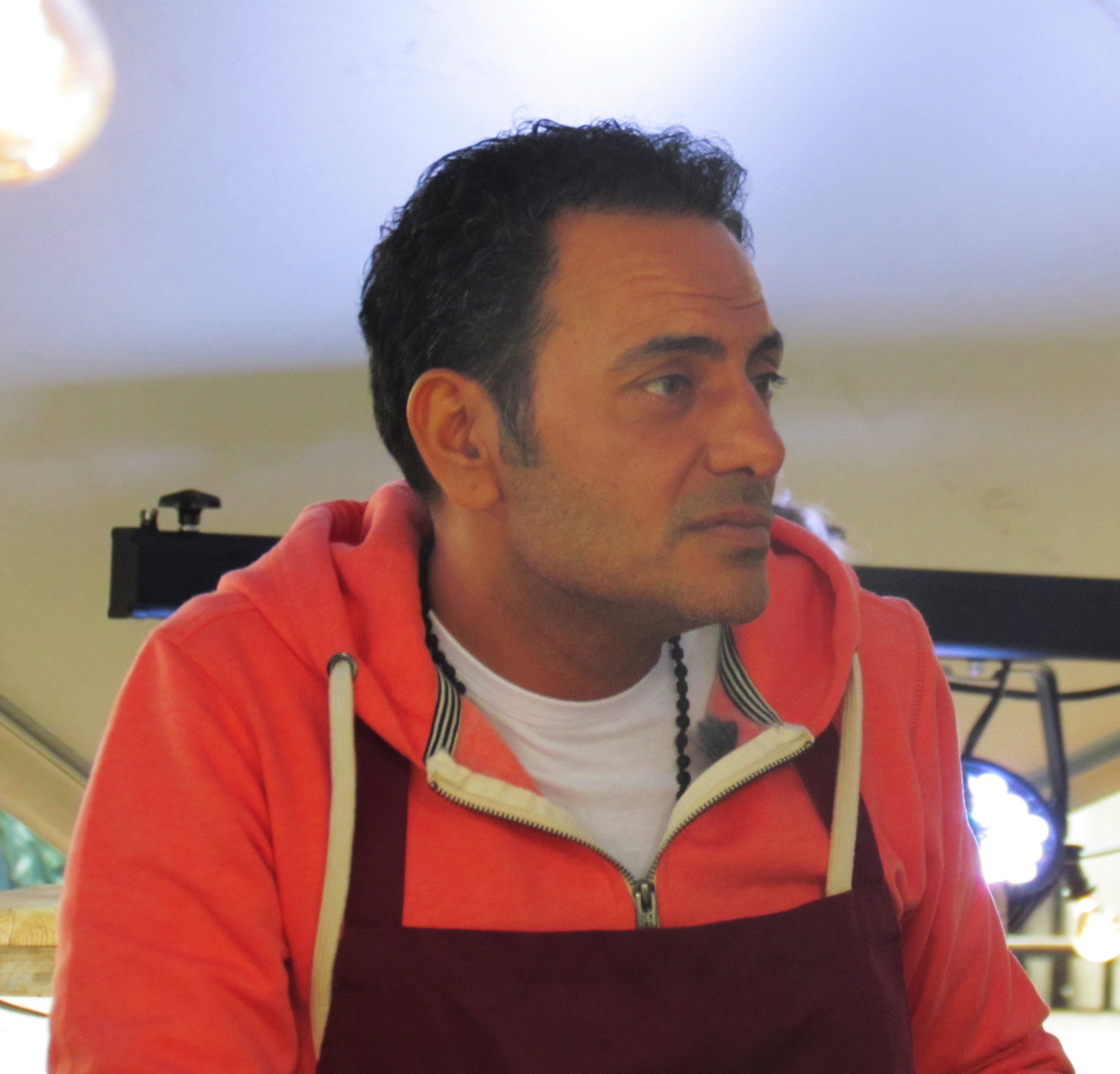
- Kefah Allush (2014)
- Born: 1 December 1969 (age 55)

Kefah Allush (born 1 December 1969) is a Dutch television presenter, producer and author.

== Career ==
As of 2009, he works at the Evangelische Omroep. He has produced various television programs, including The Passion, De Pelgrimscode and Kerstfeest op de Dam. He was also the procession reporter in the 2017 edition of The Passion. He has also presented the television show De Verandering in 2016 and 2017. He is also the presenter of the television show De Kist (Dutch for The Coffin) in which he visits a well-known Dutch person in each episode with a wooden coffin to talk about death.

In 2019, Allush won the Sonja Barend Award for best television interview. He won the award for his interview with retired Royal Netherlands Army general Peter van Uhm in De Kist. In the interview Van Uhm talks about the death of his son who was killed in a roadside bombing during a mission in Afghanistan.

He is the author of the book De munt van Judea. The book was nominated for the Gouden Strop award in 2019.

== Filmography ==
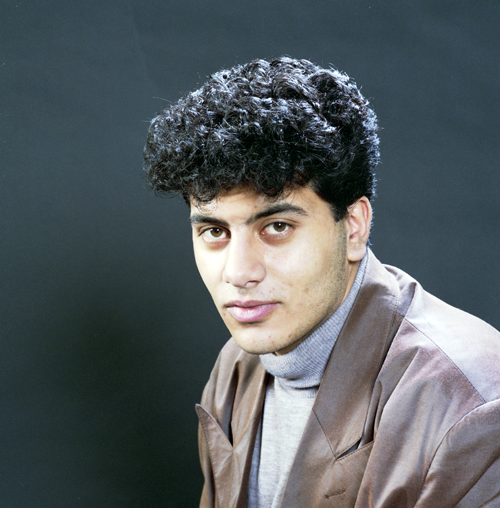
Kefah Allush (1988).

=== As presenter ===
- De Kist (2012 – )
- De Verandering (2016, 2017)
- Van Nablus naar Ninevé (2016)
- Van Ninevé naar Nazareth (2017)
- Van Atlas naar Arabië (2018)
