= De Kist =

Dutch television show

- Presented by: Herman Wegter; Kefah Allush
- Country of origin: Netherlands
- Original language: Dutch

Original release
- Release: 2009

De Kist (Dutch for The Coffin) is a Dutch television show by the Evangelische Omroep in which Kefah Allush visits a well-known Dutch person in each episode with a wooden coffin to talk about death. From 2009 till 2012 the show was presented by Herman Wegter.

In 2019, Allush won the Sonja Barend Award for best television interview. He won the award for his interview with retired Royal Netherlands Army general Peter van Uhm in De Kist. In the interview Van Uhm talks about the death of his son who was killed in a roadside bombing during a mission in Afghanistan.
