= Herman Pleij =

Dutch professor

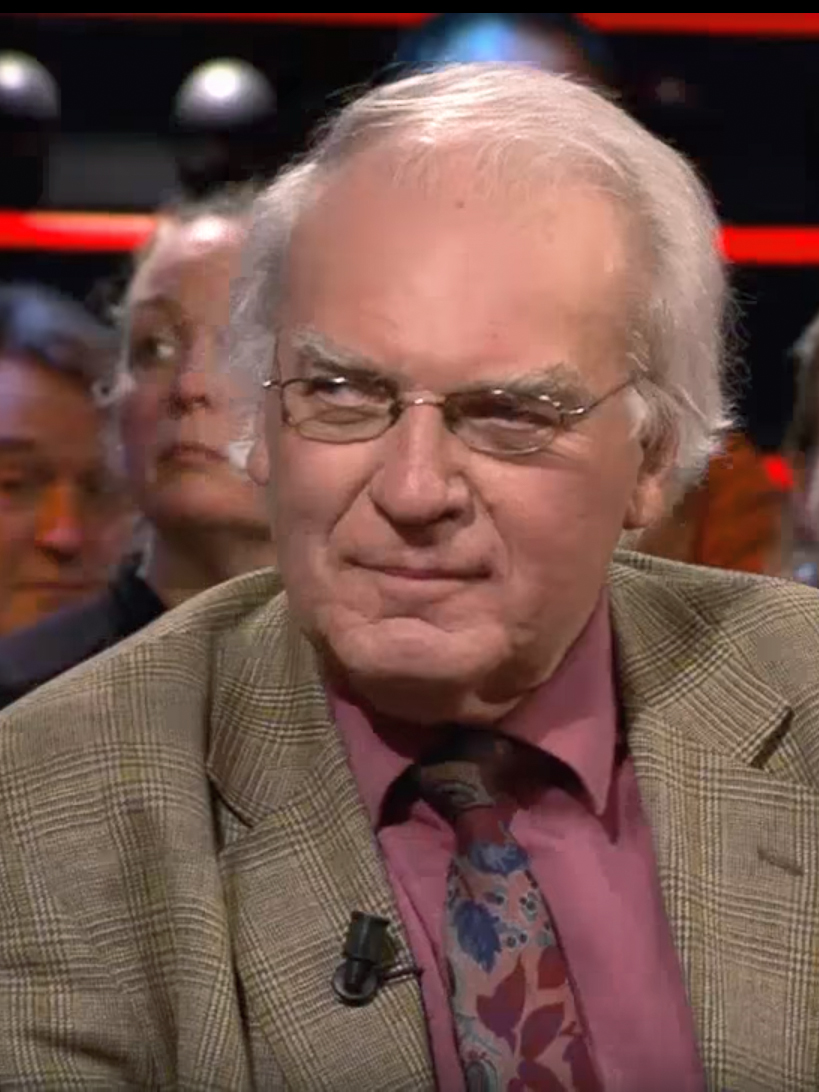
- Herman Pleij (2017)
- Born: February 24, 1943 (age 83); Hilversum, The Netherlands

Academic background
- Education: University of Amsterdam
- Thesis: Het Gilde van de Blauwe Schuit: Literatuur, volksfeest en burgermoraal in de late middeleeuwen (Guild of the Blue Barge : Literature, festival and civic morality in the late Middle Ages) (1979)

Academic work
- Discipline: Dutch Literature
- Sub-discipline: Medieval and Renaissance
- Website: http://cf.hum.uva.nl/nhl/Pagina%20Pleij.htm

Herman Pleij (born 1943) is a professor emeritus of Medieval Dutch literature at the University of Amsterdam. He was appointed professor in 1981 and taught until February 2008.

== Career ==
In 1979 he completed his thesis on De Blauwe Schuit, among other ancient carnival texts. In 1981 he became a professor at the University of Amsterdam. From 1992 to 1994 he was dean of the Faculty of Arts. He retired on February 29, 2008. Since then he has published many works on cultural history, such as the issue of national identity. His interest in the social debate on any available subject is reflected in his frequent participation in talk shows on Dutch television.

== Honors ==
- 2000: Honorary doctorate from the Catholic University of Brussels
- 2008: Knight in the Order of the Netherlands Lion

== Works ==
- Het Gilde van de Blauwe Schuit. Literatuur, volksfeest en burgermoraal in de late middeleeuwen (dissertation, Gemeentelijke Universiteit Amsterdam, 1979)
- Van schelmen en schavuiten. Laatmiddeleeuwse vagebondteksten (compiled by Herman Pleij, 1985)
- De sneeuwpoppen van 1511. Literatuur en stadscultuur tussen middeleeuwen en moderne tijd (1988)
- Op belofte van profijt; stadscultuur en burgermoraal in de Nederlandse letterkunde van de middeleeuwen (ed., 1991)
- Zandgrond (1994) - novel
- Dromen van Cocagne. Middeleeuwse fantasieën over het volmaakte leven (1997)
- Hollands welbehagen (1998)
- Tegen de barbarij; tien stukken over de Nederlandse beschaving (1999)
- Dreaming of Cockaigne: Medieval Fantasies of the Perfect Life. New York: Columbia University Press, 2001.
- Van karmijn, purper en blauw; over kleuren van de Middeleeuwen en daarna (2002)
- De Herontdekking van Nederland: over vaderlandse mentaliteiten en rituelen (2003)
- Colors Demonic and Divine: Shades of Meaning in the Middle Ages and After. Translated by Diane Webb. New York, Columbia University Press, 2004.
- Erasmus en het poldermodel (2005), ISBN 9035127374
- De eeuw van de zotheid; Plaatsen van herinnering, deel I (2007)
- Het gevleugelde woord. Geschiedenis van de Nederlandse literatuur, deel II: van 1400 tot 1560 (2007)
- Anna Bijns, van Antwerpen (2011)
- Moet kunnen. Op zoek naar een Nederlandse identiteit. (2014)
- Botte Hollanders (2015) - anthology of Moet kunnen. Op zoek naar een Nederlandse identiteit
- Geluk!? Van Hemelse Gave tot Hebbeding (2017)
- Zucht naar identiteit (2018)
- Oefeningen in genot. Liefde en lust in de late Middeleeuwen (2020)
- Met een scheef oog. Tijdsbeelden aan de hand van mijzelf (2022)
