= Viola Holt =

Dutch television presenter (1949–2025)

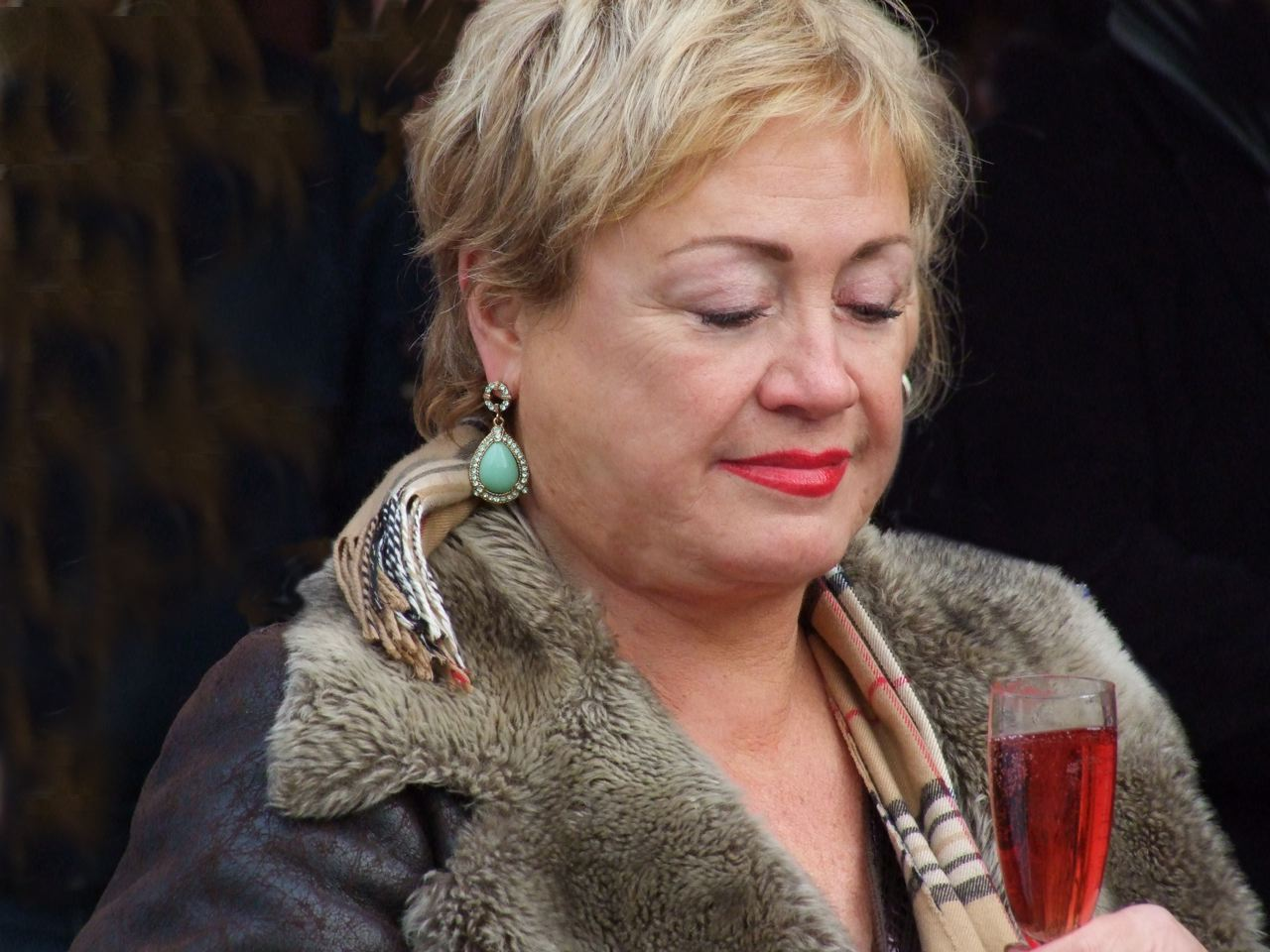
Holt in 2008

Viola Holt (5 August 1949 – 6 November 2025) was a Dutch television presenter. She died on 6 November 2025, at the age of 76.
