= Horst, Limburg =

Horst Hôrs
- Village
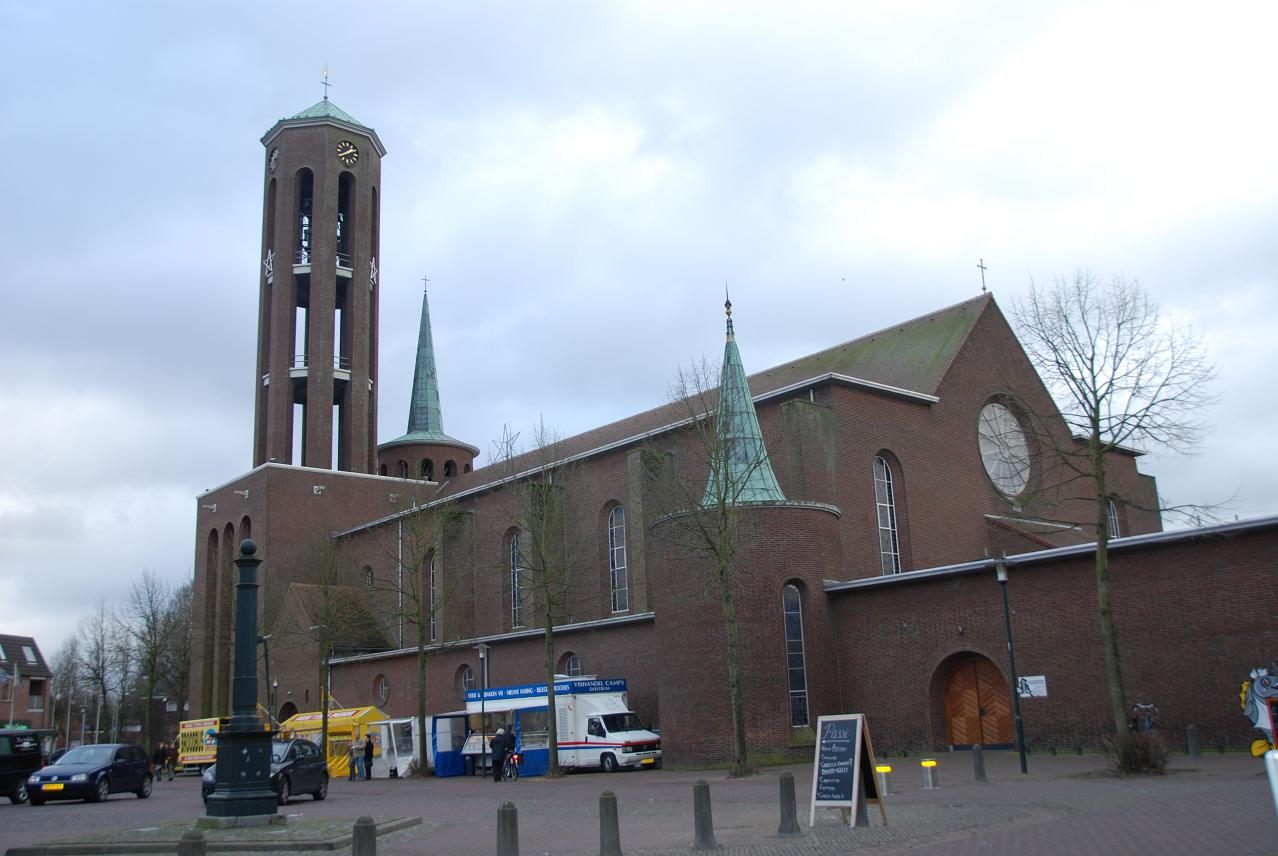

- Flag Coat of arms

- Location in the Netherlands Location in the province of Limburg in the Netherlands
- Coordinates: 51°27′5″N 6°3′13″E
- Country: Netherlands
- Province: Limburg
- Municipality: Horst aan de Maas

Area
  - Total: 18.62 km^{2} (7.19 sq mi)
- Elevation: 24 m (79 ft)

Population (2021)
  - Total: 13,080
  - Density: 702.5/km^{2} (1,819/sq mi)
- Time zone: UTC+1 (CET)
  - Summer (DST): UTC+2 (CEST)
- Postal code: 5961
- Dialing code: 077

Horst (Dutch pronunciation: [ɦɔrst]) is a village in the Dutch province of Limburg. It is located in the municipality of Horst aan de Maas. Although the municipality is named after the village, Horst itself is not called "aan de Maas", because it does not lie directly on the river Meuse (in Dutch called Maas).

Horst is known for its holiday parks. It is a popular destination for people looking for walks and cycling in nature. The village centre has plenty of cafes and restaurants and during summer season markets and other events are held regularly.

== Towns and the number of inhabitants on 1 January 2016 ==
- America, 2.055
- Broekhuizen, 763
- Broekhuizenvorst, 1077
- Eversoort, 256
- Griendtsveen, 541
- Grubbenvorst, 4.799
- Hegelsom, 1.908
- Horst, 12.780
- Kronenberg, 1.152
- Lottum, 1.948
- Meerlo, 1.892
- Melderslo, 2.053
- Meterik, 1.471
- Sevenum, 6.546
- Swolgen, 1.230
- Tienray, 1.208
- Total, 41.679

(Updated from the 2016 Horst aan de Maas official website infographics data)

Horst was a separate municipality until it merged with Broekhuizen and Grubbenvorst to form the new municipality Horst aan de Maas in 2007. Later, the villages of Grubbenvorst, Lottum, Broekhuizen and Broekhuizenvorst were added to the municipality.

== Transportation ==
Railway station: Horst-Sevenum

The village can be reached by buses 60 and 69

Horst is adjacent to the A73 motorway which runs north–south. A few kilometres away the A73 intersects with the A67, which runs east–west.

Germany is about 15 kilometres east of Horst. Weeze Airport is about 40 minutes by car.
