= Sevenum =

Sevenum Zaerum
- Village
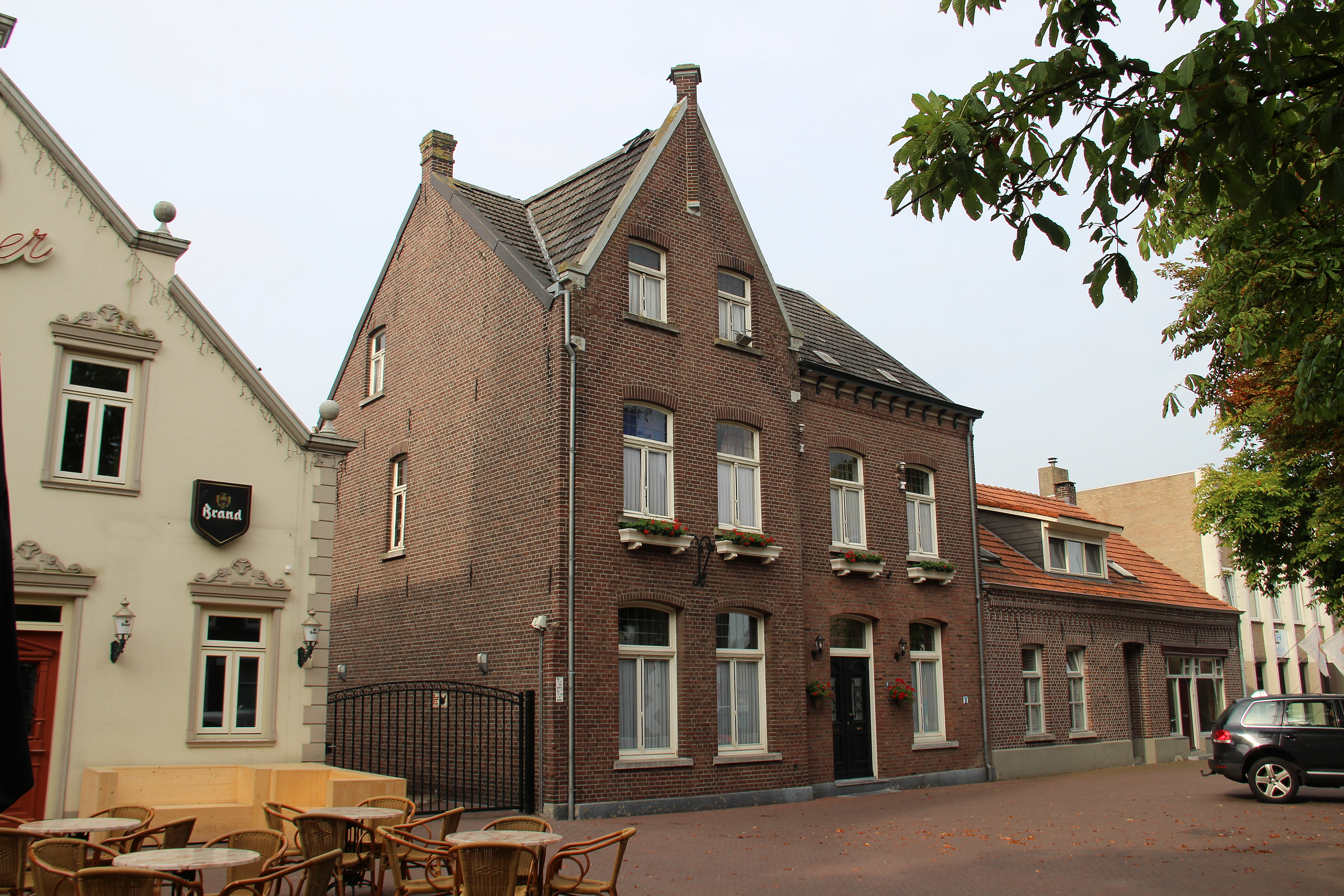
- House in Sevenum

- Flag Coat of arms

- Location in the Netherlands Location in the province of Limburg in the Netherlands
- Coordinates: 51°25′N 6°02′E
- Country: Netherlands
- Province: Limburg
- Municipality: Horst aan de Maas

Area
  - Total: 26.84 km^{2} (10.36 sq mi)
- Elevation: 28 m (92 ft)

Population (2025)
  - Total: 6,945
  - Density: 258.8/km^{2} (670.2/sq mi)
- Time zone: UTC+1 (CET)
  - Summer (DST): UTC+2 (CEST)
- Postal code: 5975
- Dialing code: 077

Sevenum (Dutch: [ˈseːvənʏm]; Limburgish: Zaerum) is a town in the province of Limburg in southeastern Netherlands. Until 2010, it was also the name of the municipality comprising the towns of Sevenum, Kronenberg and Evertsoord. Amusement park Toverland is located in Sevenum.

== Location ==
Sevenum's neighbour towns are (clockwise, starting from East): Blerick, Venlo, Maasbree, Evertsoord, Kronenberg, and Hegelsom. Currently, Sevenum is part of the municipality Horst aan de Maas, and is the second biggest town, after Horst, Limburg.

Sevenum-town and Kronenberg are tangented by highway E34, provincial road N277 (Middenpeelweg), and the railroad track Eindhoven-Venlo; Evertsoord lies on the edge of the Peel, a former peatland.

== Dialect ==
Sevenum's dialect, "Zaerums", is transitional between Limburgish, North-Limburgish (see Low Rhenish), and Brabantian, which all have tentative borders within a larger dialect continuum.

The overview of town names in Limburgish at Streektaal.net lists "Zaerum" (Sevenum) and "De Kroeënenberg" (Kronenberg), but it does not include "De Pieël" (Evertsoord), considering it to be in the North-Limburgish area.

== Gallery ==
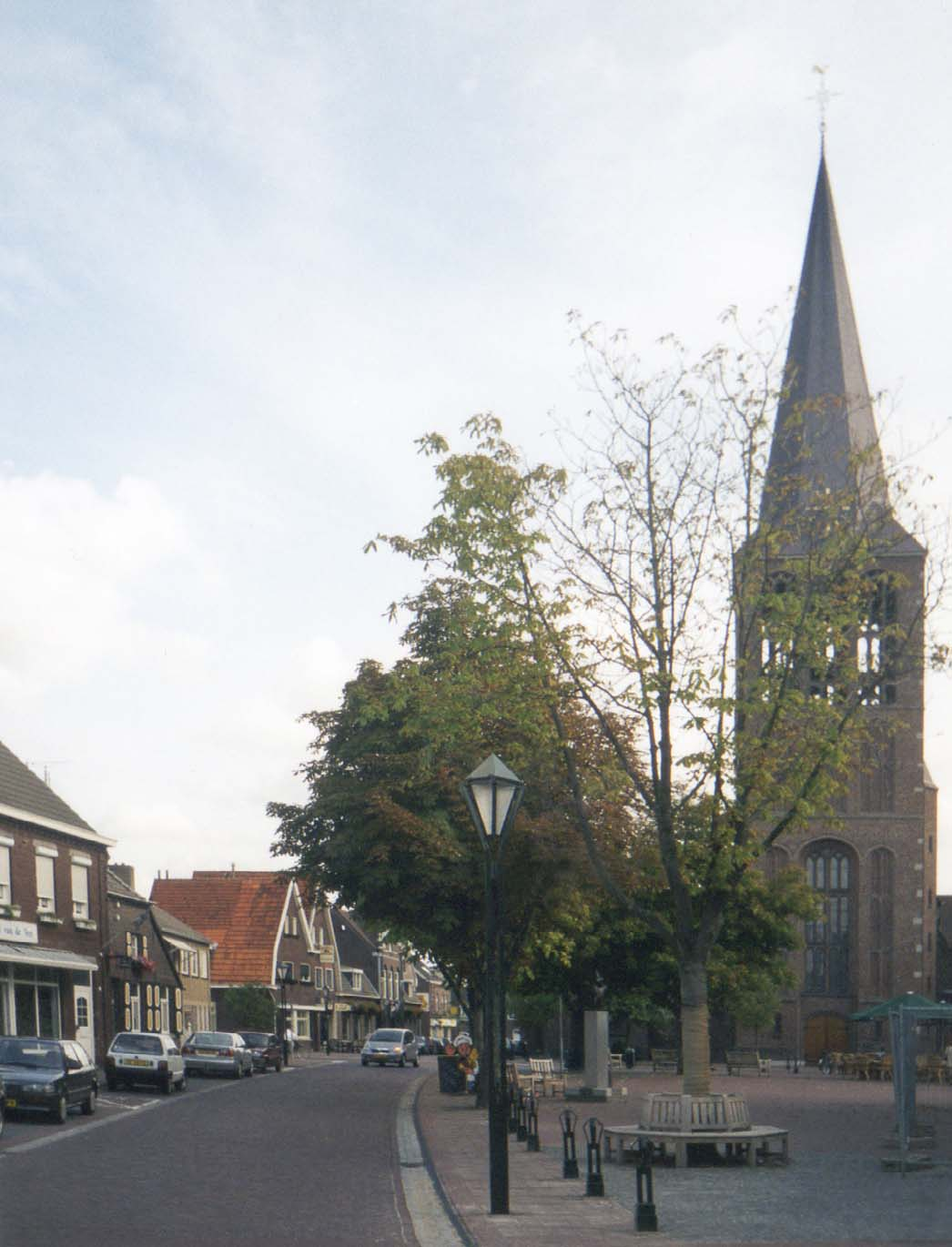
The centre of Sevenum. Hear the church bells ringing.
