= Meerlo-Wanssum =

Meerlo-Wanssum Mieëldere-Wânsem (Limburgish)
- Former municipality
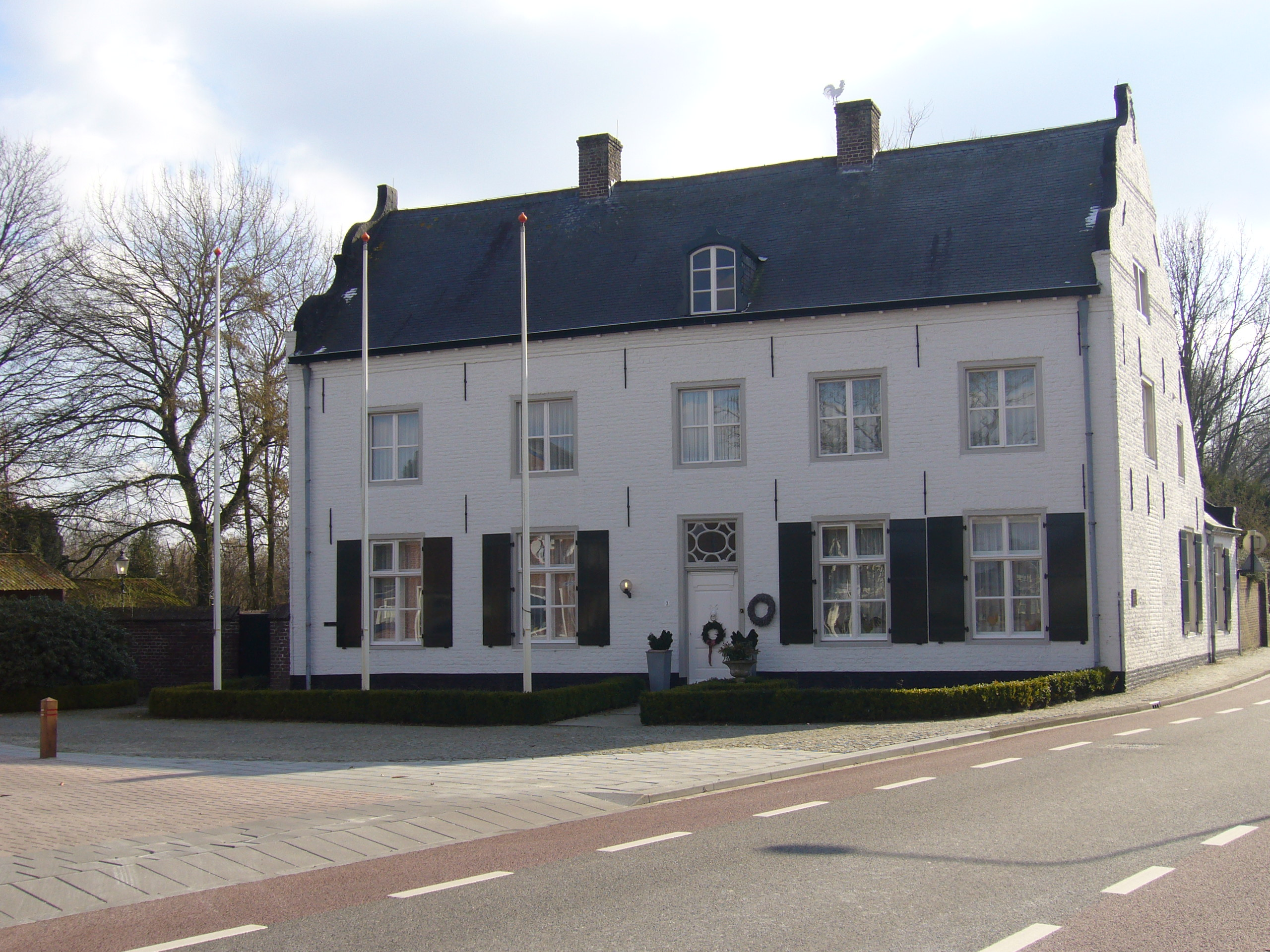
- Huize Meerlo

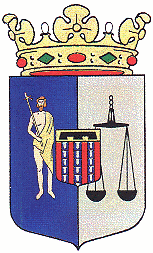
- Flag Coat of arms

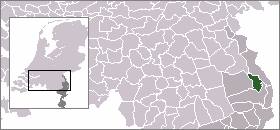
- Coordinates: 51°31′33″N 6°04′54″E
- Country: Netherlands
- Province: Limburg
- Municipality: Horst aan de Maas, Venray

Area (2006)
  - Total: 39.40 km^{2} (15.21 sq mi)
  - Land: 38.44 km^{2} (14.84 sq mi)
  - Water: 0.96 km^{2} (0.37 sq mi)

Population (1 January 2007)
  - Total: 7,663
  - Density: 199/km^{2} (520/sq mi)
- Source: CBS, Statline.
- Time zone: UTC+1 (CET)
  - Summer (DST): UTC+2 (CEST)

Meerlo-Wanssum (Dutch: [ˌmeːrloː ˈʋɑnsʏm]; Limburgish: Mieëldere-Wânsem) was a municipality in Limburg, the Netherlands. The municipality ceased to exist as of January 2010.

== Population centres ==
- Blitterswijck, now part of municipality: Venray
- Geijsteren, now part of municipality: Venray
- Meerlo, now part of municipality: Horst aan de Maas
- Swolgen, now part of municipality: Horst aan de Maas
- Tienray, now part of municipality: Horst aan de Maas
- Wanssum, now part of municipality: Venray
