= Horst aan de Maas =

Horst aan de Maas Haors aan de Maos (Limburgish)
- Municipality
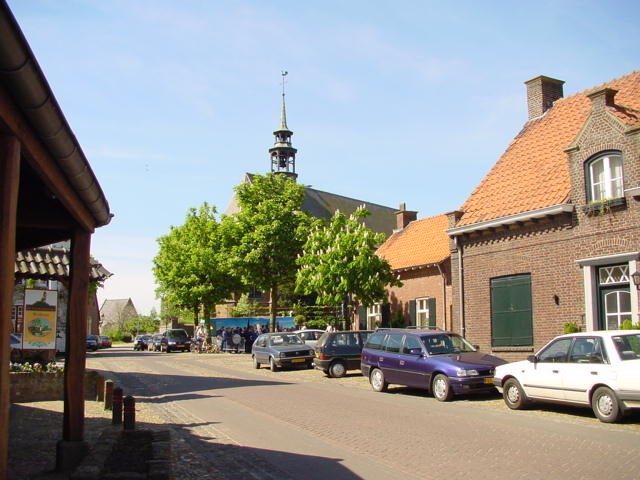
- Broekhuizen town square

- Flag Coat of arms

- Location in Limburg
- Coordinates: 51°27′N 6°3′E
- Country: Netherlands
- Province: Limburg
- Established: 1 January 2001

Government
  - Body: Municipal council
  - Mayor: Ina Leppink-Schuitema (VVD)

Area
  - Total: 191.92 km^{2} (74.10 sq mi)
  - Land: 188.73 km^{2} (72.87 sq mi)
  - Water: 3.19 km^{2} (1.23 sq mi)
- Elevation: 24 m (79 ft)

Population (January 2021)
  - Total: 42,487
  - Density: 225/km^{2} (580/sq mi)
- Time zone: UTC+1 (CET)
  - Summer (DST): UTC+2 (CEST)
- Postcode: 5864–5872, 5960–5977
- Area code: 0478, 077
- Website: www.horstaandemaas.nl

Horst aan de Maas (Dutch: [ˈɦɔrst aːn də ˈmaːs]; Limburgish: Haors aan de Maos [ˈɦɔːʀs aːn də ˈmɔːs]) is a municipality in the southeastern Netherlands, in the province of Limburg. In 2010 the municipalities Sevenum and part of Meerlo-Wanssum joined the municipality.

== Population centres ==
America, Broekhuizen, Broekhuizenvorst, Evertsoort, Griendtsveen, Grubbenvorst, Hegelsom, Horst, Kronenberg, Lottum, Meerlo, Melderslo, Meterik, Sevenum, Swolgen and Tienray.

=== Topography ===
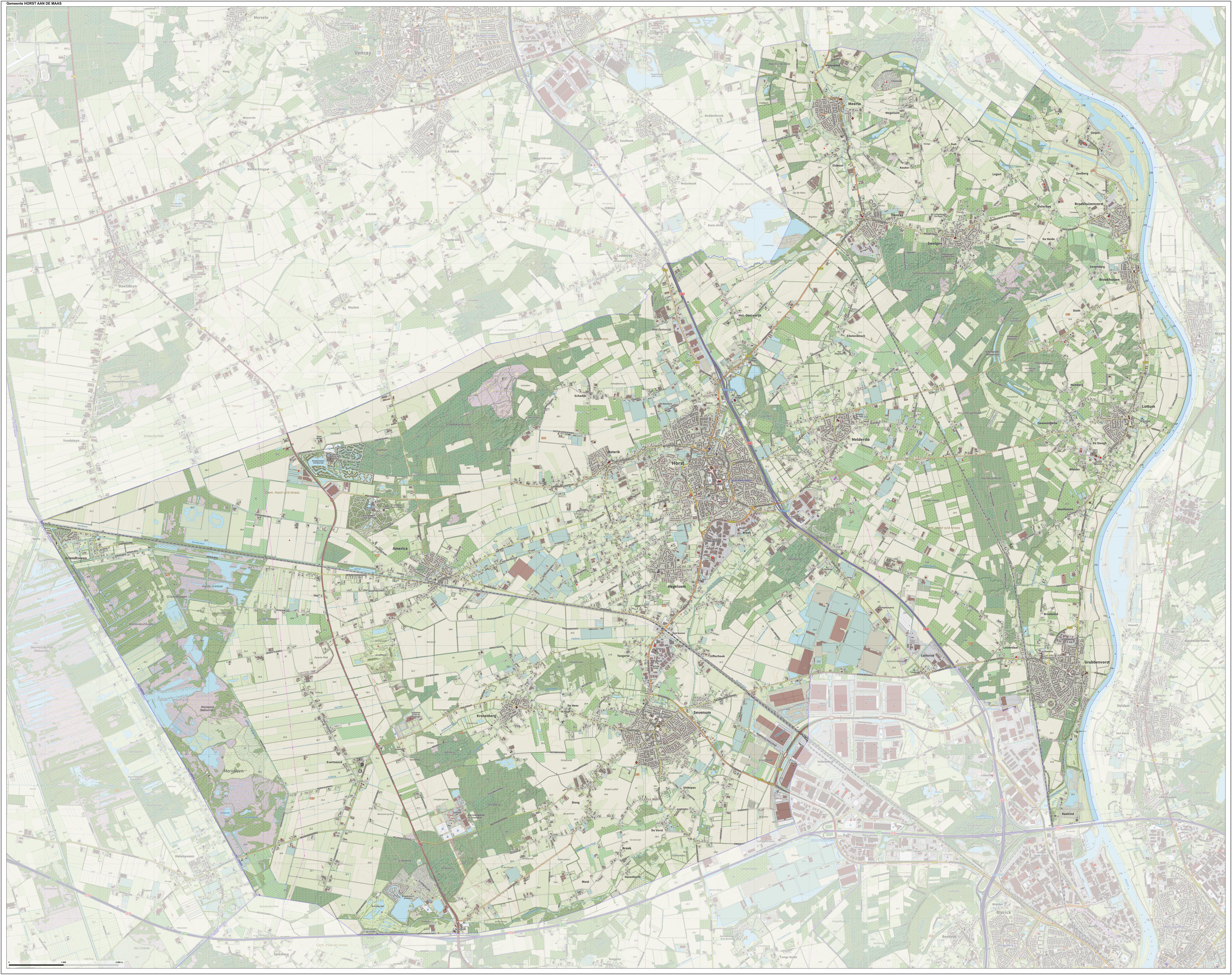

Dutch Topographic map of the municipality of Horst aan de Maas, June 2015.

== Notable people ==
- Frans Schraven (1873 in Lottum – 1937) a Dutch Catholic bishop who served as a missionary in China
- Hub van Doorne (1900 in America – 1979) and his brother Wim, founded DAF
- Servaas Huys (1940 in Grubbenvorst – 2016) a Dutch politician
- Jack Poels (born 1957 in America) singer, guitarist and harmonica player of Rowwen Hèze
- Peter Jenniskens (born 1962 in Horst) a Dutch and American astronomer and senior research scientist
- Twan Huys (born 1964 in Sevenum) a Dutch journalist, TV presenter and author
- Raymond Knops (born 1971 in Hegelsom) a Dutch politician
- Marijn Poels (born 1975 in Meerlo) a Dutch independent filmmaker and documentary maker
- Mark Verheijen (born 1976 in Baarlo) a Dutch politician
- Rowwen Hèze (founded 1985) a Limburgish folk band
- Heideroosjes (active 1989-2012) punk rock band

=== Sport ===
- Paul Verhaegh (born 1983 in Kronenberg) a former Dutch football player with 453 club caps and 3 international caps
- Dirk Marcellis (born 1988 in Horst) a former Dutch football player with 259 club caps
- Dominique Janssen (born 1995 in Horst) Dutch football player for the Netherlands national team
