= Raymond Knops =

Dutch politician (born 1971)

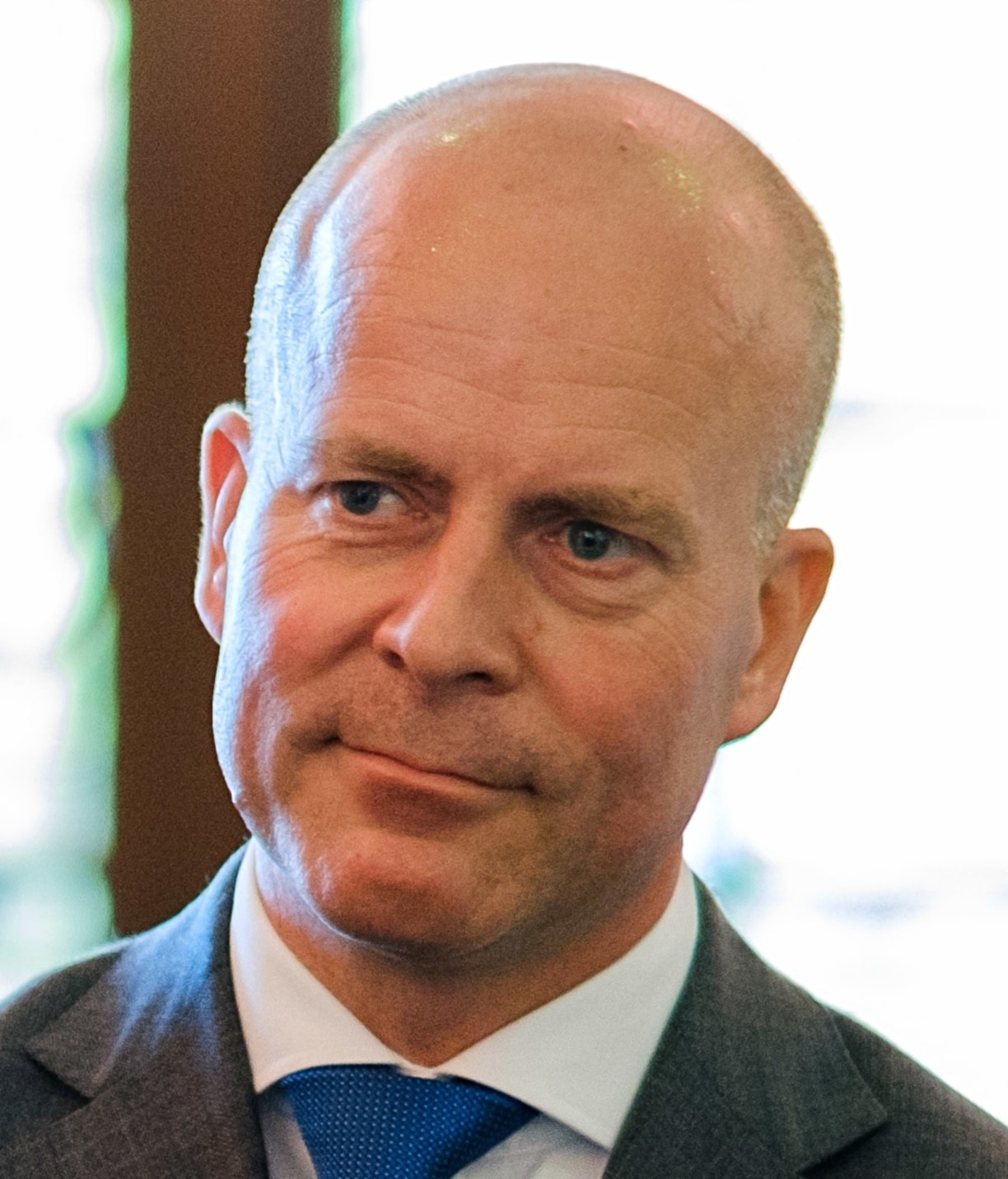
- Knops in 2018

Minister of the Interior and Kingdom Relations
- Acting
- In office 1 November 2019 – 14 April 2020
- Prime Minister: Mark Rutte
- Preceded by: Kajsa Ollongren
- Succeeded by: Kajsa Ollongren

State Secretary for the Interior and Kingdom Relations
- In office 14 April 2020 – 10 January 2022
- Prime Minister: Mark Rutte
- Preceded by: Himself (2019)
- Succeeded by: Alexandra van Huffelen
- In office 26 October 2017 – 1 November 2019
- Prime Minister: Mark Rutte
- Preceded by: Ank Bijleveld (2010)
- Succeeded by: Himself (2020)

Member of the House of Representatives
- In office 31 March 2021 – 2 February 2023
- In office 7 September 2010 – 26 October 2017
- In office 1 March 2007 – 17 June 2010
- In office 11 October 2005 – 30 November 2006

Personal details
- Born: Raymond Willem Knops; 10 November 1971 (age 54) Hegelsom, Netherlands
- Party: Christian Democratic Appeal
- Children: 2 children
- Education: Koninklijke Militaire Academie; Erasmus University Rotterdam (Bachelor of Public Administration, Master of Public Administration)
- Occupation: Politician · Military officer

Military service
- Allegiance: Netherlands
- Branch/service: Royal Netherlands Air Force
- Years of service: 1995–2000 (Active duty); 2000–2005 (Reserve)
- Rank: Colonel
- Unit: No. 322 Squadron RNLAF; 11th Airmobile Brigade; Multi-National Force – Iraq
- Battles/wars: War on terror; War in Afghanistan; Iraq War

Raymond Willem Knops (born 10 November 1971) is a Dutch politician and retired RNLAF officer who served as State Secretary for the Interior and Kingdom Relations under the Third Rutte cabinet from 2017 to 2019 and again from 2020 until 2022. A member of the Christian Democratic Appeal (CDA), he was Minister of the Interior and Kingdom Relations from 2019 to 2020 in an acting capacity. Knops has held a seat in the House of Representatives between 2005 and 2023 with three interruptions due to cabinet formation processes and service in government.

== Early political career ==
As a member of the Christian Democratic Appeal, Raymond Knops he was elected to the municipal council of Horst aan de Maas in 1998. In 1999, he became an alderman in the municipal executive, in which he was in charge of economic and agricultural affairs, spatial planning, traffic, the environment and public housing until 2001, when he became Deputy Mayor and alderman in charge of economic affairs, agribusiness, recreation and tourism and strategic projects. He held the position until 2005, when he entered the House of Representatives following the resignation of Hubert Bruls, who had been appointed to the mayorship of Venlo.

== National career ==
Knops has served as a member of the House of Representatives from 11 October 2005 to 30 November 2006, from 1 March 2007 to 17 June 2010, from 7 September 2010 to 26 October 2017 and again since 31 March 2021. He returned as a parliamentarian in 2007 as the Fourth Balkenende cabinet had been sworn in, as well as in 2010 as the successor of Ab Klink, who had resigned his seat. In the 2021 election, Knops was returned to the House of Representatives as the outgoing State Secretary for the Interior and Kingdom Relations. In the House of Representatives, he focuses his work on matters of political asylum policy and defence.

Knops was appointed State Secretary at the Ministry of the Interior and Kingdom Relations under Minister Kajsa Ollongren in the Third Rutte cabinet on 26 October 2017. From 1 November 2019 until 14 April 2020, he was Acting Minister of the Interior and Kingdom Relations due to Ollongren's extended medical leave of absence. He then returned as a State Secretary and was succeeded on 10 January 2022 by Alexandra van Huffelen as the Fourth Rutte cabinet was installed.

There had been speculation Knops would be Minister of Defence in the Fourth Rutte cabinet after similar speculation in 2017. However, during the 2021–2022 cabinet formation process, the ministry was awarded to Ollongren of the Democrats 66 party. In February 2023, he left the House of Representatives to become a lobbyist for The Netherlands Industries for Defence & Security.

He became "manure scout" in November 2024, assisting agriculture minister Femke Wiersma in mitigating a manure surplus. Knops was tasked with investigating whether more permits could be granted to increase the manure handling capacity.

== Honours and awards ==
- Member 1st Class of the Order of the Cross of Terra Mariana (Estonia, 5 June 2018)

== Electoral history ==
Electoral history of Raymond Knops
| Year | Body | Party | Pos. | Votes | Result | | Ref. |
| Year | Body | Party | Pos. | Votes | Party seats | Individual | Ref. |
|---|---|---|---|---|---|---|---|
| 2021 | House of Representatives | Christian Democratic Appeal | 5 | 8,881 | 15 | Won | |

Political offices
| Preceded by Ank Bijleveld; 2010 | State Secretary for the Interior and Kingdom Relations; 2017–2019; 2020–2022 | Succeeded by Alexandra van Huffelen |
| Preceded by Kajsa Ollongren | Minister of the Interior and Kingdom Relations; 2019–2020 | Succeeded by Kajsa Ollongren |
