= Frans Schraven =

Dutch Catholic Bishop and missionary

Franciscus Hubertus Schraven C.M.
- Vicar Apostolic of Zhengding
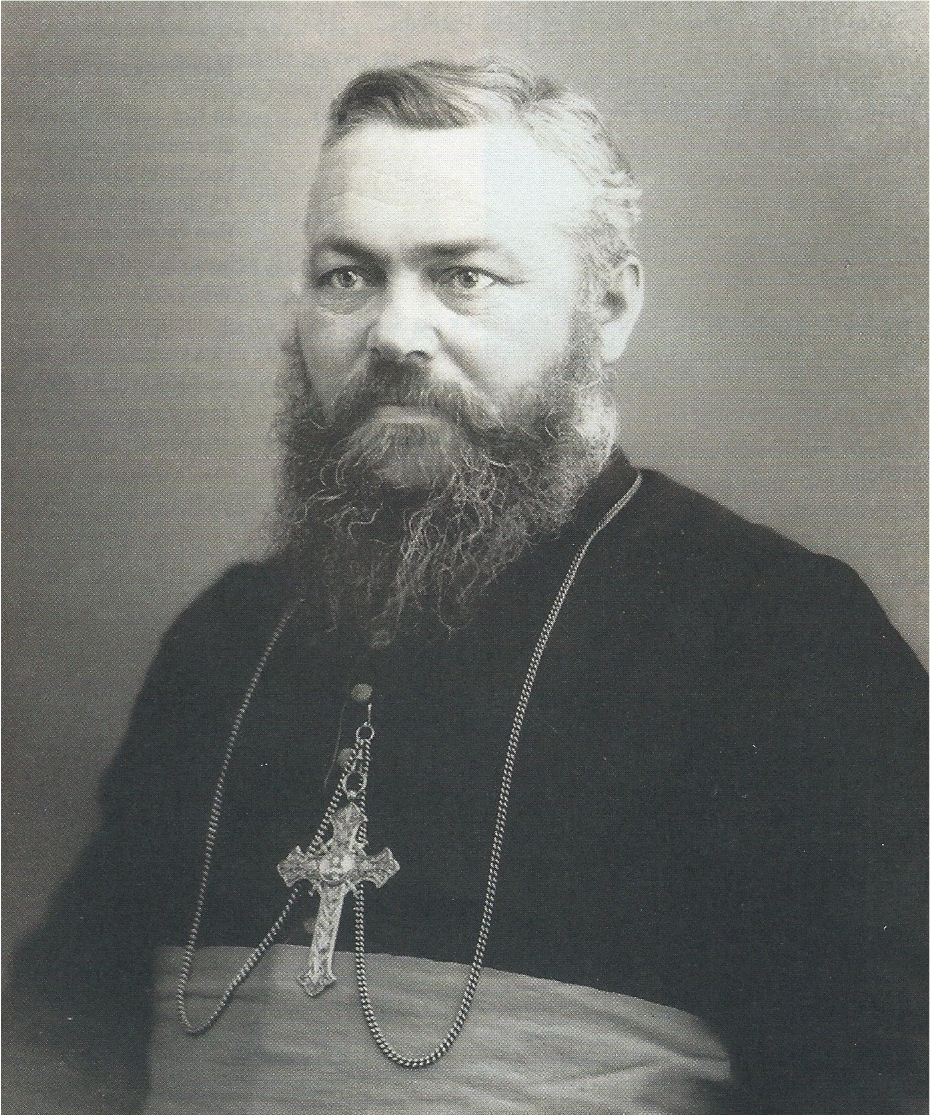
- Native name: Frans Schraven

Orders
- Ordination: 28 May 1899
- Consecration: 10 April 1921

Personal details
- Born: 13 October 1873
- Died: 9 October 1937 (aged 63)
- Denomination: Roman Catholic
- Coat of arms

Frans Schraven (13 October 1873 – 9 October 1937) was a Dutch Catholic Bishop who served as a missionary in China. He died in Zhengding, Hebei, China while attempting to protect the local population during the Sino-Japanese war.

== Early life ==
Schraven was born in Lottum in the province of Limburg. He was educated at the Episcopal College in Roermond and was ordained priest in Paris in May 1899. The same year of his ordination he followed his calling as missionary in China.

On 10 April 1921 he was made Bishop in the city of Zhengding.

== Death ==
The Second Sino-Japanese war broke out in September 1931. As the Imperial Japanese troops progressed through Eastern China, they reached Zhengding as part of the full-scale invasion in 1937. Around 5,000 local residents, including 200 young women, sought refuge with the Catholic priests from the advancing army. It is thought that the young women were at risk of being taken away of comfort women for the soldiers.

Schraven resisted the Japanese troops. When confronted by Japanese soldiers he allegedly responded by saying, "You can kill me if you want but you will never get what you ask for". He and his fellow 8 priests were subsequently kidnapped and burned alive.

=== Alternative account ===
The Japanese historical revisionist organization, Society for the Dissemination of Historical Fact, questions the murder of the priest by Japanese soldiers. They dismiss accusations of the crime as propaganda, citing that there had been no houses for comfort women in the area at the time.

Correspondence between the Japanese and French embassies in Beijing suggests that Japanese officials rejected responsibility at the time, blaming rogue Chinese forces for their deaths.

A memorial was erected for the deaths of the priests without accepting responsibility.

== Legacy ==
In 2013, Frans Wiertz, Bishop of Roermond, initiated proceeding for the beatification of Frans Schraven for his martyrdom. Documents have been passed to the Congregation for the Causes of Saints in Rome in 2014 as part of the process. There have been calls for the canonisation of Schraven as the patron saint of sex abuse victims.

In 2016, the Schraven Path was opened, a 10 km walk way in his home town of Lottum, connecting his birthplace and local chapels.

== See also ==
- Catholic Church in China
