= Melderslo =

- Village
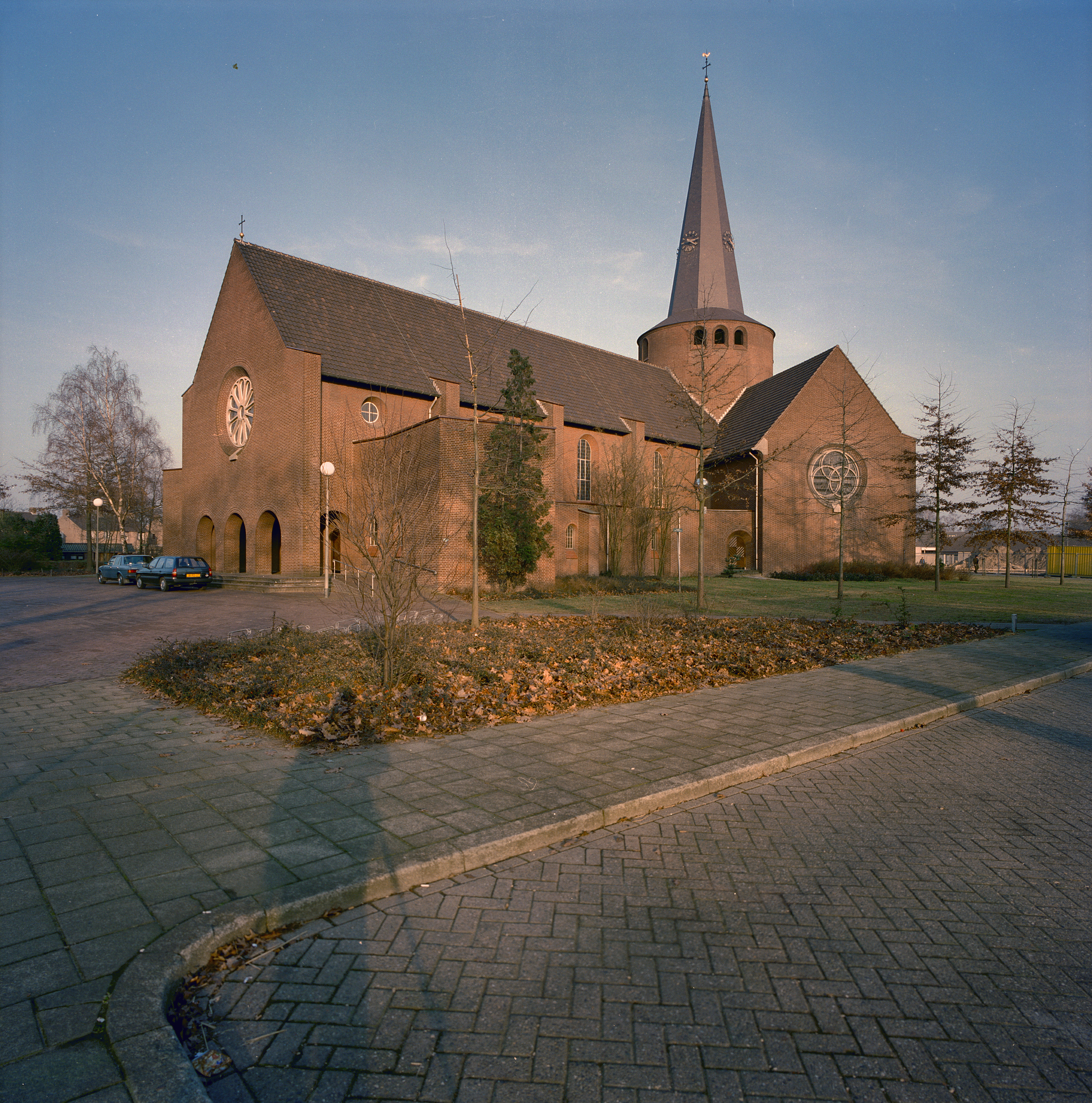
- St Oda Church

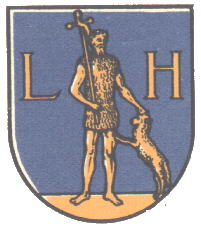
- Coat of arms

- Location in the Netherlands Location in the province of Limburg in the Netherlands
- Coordinates: 51°27′45″N 6°5′8″E
- Country: Netherlands
- Province: Limburg
- Municipality: Horst aan de Maas

Area
  - Total: 8.91 km^{2} (3.44 sq mi)
- Elevation: 23 m (75 ft)

Population (2021)
  - Total: 2,120
  - Density: 238/km^{2} (616/sq mi)
- Time zone: UTC+1 (CET)
  - Summer (DST): UTC+2 (CEST)
- Postal code: 5962
- Dialing code: 077

Melderslo is a village in the Dutch province of Limburg. It is located in the municipality of Horst aan de Maas.

The village was first mentioned in the 15th century Meldersloe, and its name either means "forest of Madalhêr (person)" or "forest belonging to Meerlo".

Melderslo was home to 301 people in 1840. On 26 May 1943, an Avro Lancaster was hit by Flak and crashed near Melderslo, killing five crew members. A monument is located at the crash site. Museum De Locht is a museum for products produced in the region. In 1993, it was extended with the National Asparagus and Champignon.

For more information on this village, visit this website with actual data on "de Melderse": melderse.nl

== Gallery ==
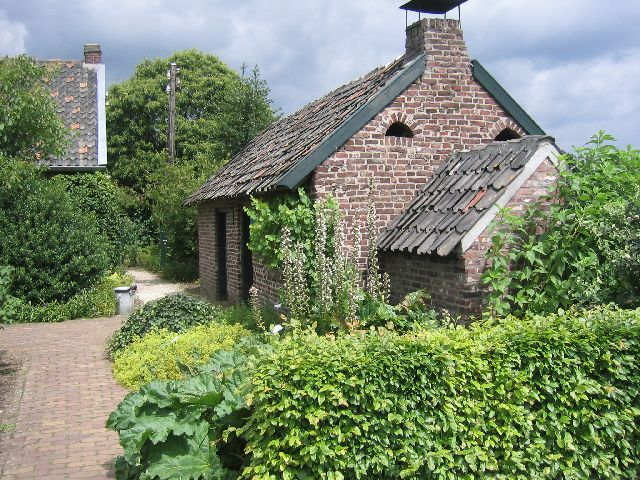
Baker's hut at Museum de Locht

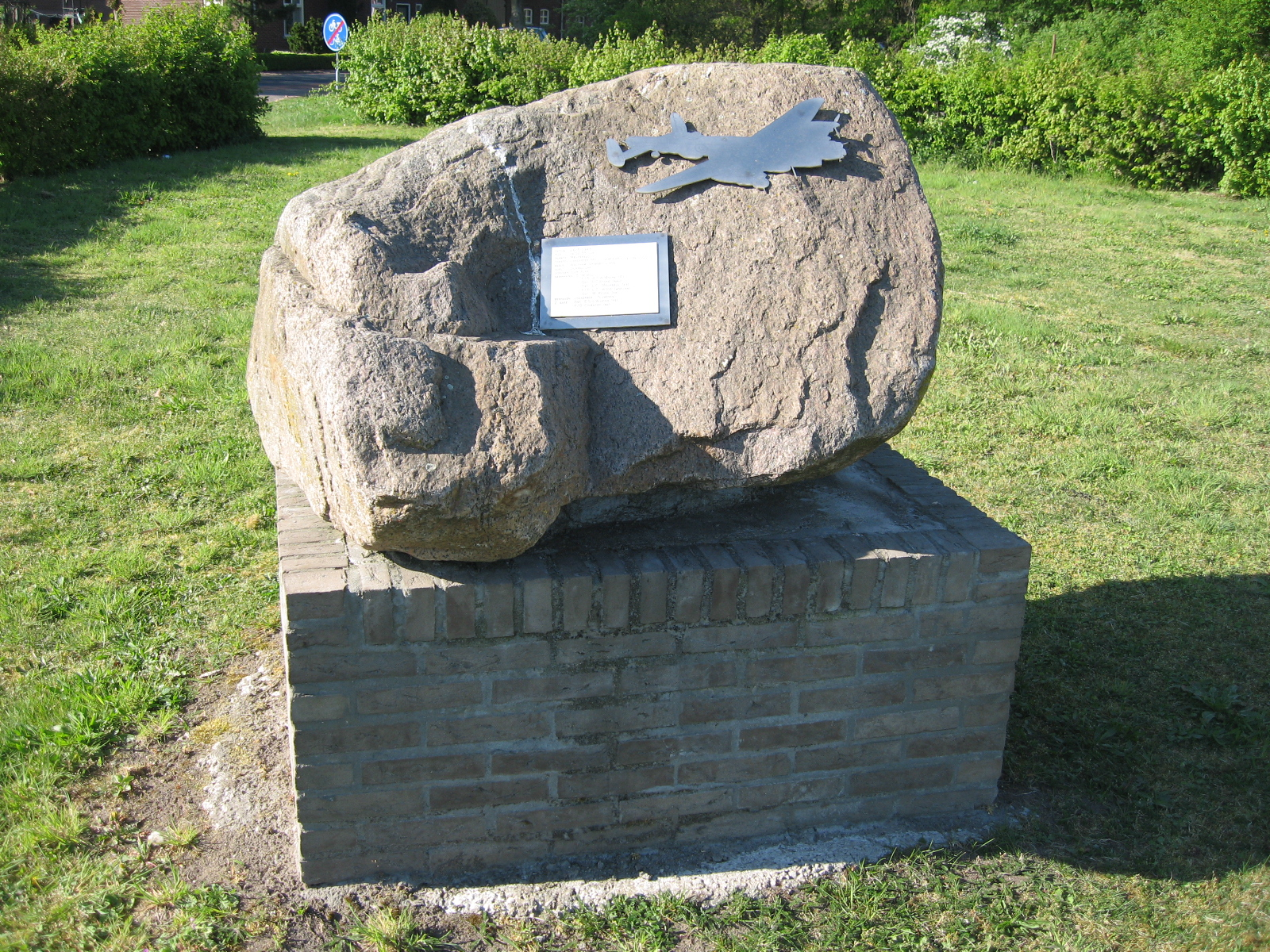
Lancaster crash memorial
