= Meterik =

- Village
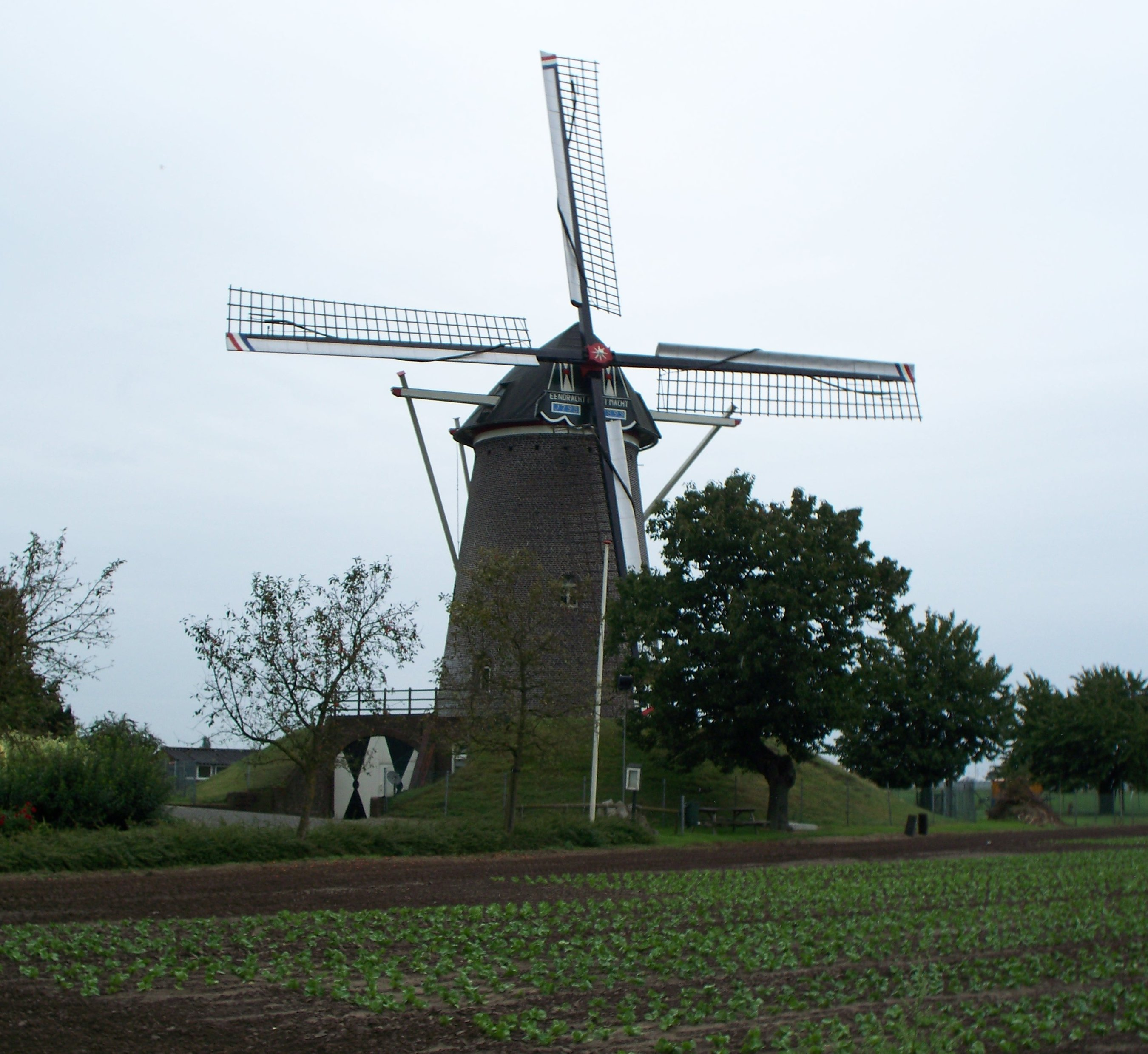
- Windmill "Eendracht maakt macht"

- Location in the Netherlands Location in the province of Limburg in the Netherlands
- Coordinates: 51°27′18.9″N 6°1′29.7″E
- Country: Netherlands
- Province: Limburg
- Municipality: Horst aan de Maas

Area
  - Total: 11.62 km^{2} (4.49 sq mi)
- Elevation: 25 m (82 ft)

Population (2021)
  - Total: 1,660
  - Density: 143/km^{2} (370/sq mi)
- Time zone: UTC+1 (CET)
  - Summer (DST): UTC+2 (CEST)
- Postal code: 5964
- Dialing code: 077

Meterik (Limburgish: De Miëterik) is a village in the Dutch province of Limburg. It is located in the municipality of Horst aan de Maas, bordering rich farmland to the north and a moor called De Peel to the west. Meterik is located along a brook, the Kabroekse Beek, which provides fertile grazing lands.

On 1 January 2019, Meterik had 1,627 inhabitants. Meterik is the ancestral home of astronomer Peter Jenniskens. The village is known as a haven for temporary workers for seasonal work in the agricultural sector. Currently, many of the workers are from Bulgaria and Romania.

== History ==
Stone tools and burial mounds were left on the heathlands that formed in Northern Limburg in the dry period of 2,500-500 BC. The oldest known permanent settlement dates from the Iron Age during the Celtic La Tène culture (450-50 BC), at a time when the climate had become wetter. In 1983, parts of the grating and the cupola of a pottery oven were found along the St. Maartensweg in Schadijk and dated to about 500 BC. Traces of Iron Age pottery from a nearby settlement were found along the Crommentuynstraat. And the outline of a farm from the late Iron Age (about 200 BC) was discovered in Meterik's Field in 2006. It is likely that Meterik's Field was established in this age. If so, the name Meterik may have roots in the Celtic language, for example "mi ater ruc", meaning "my father's rick of hay".

The region was part of the Roman Empire (50 BC - 456 AD), located in the Civitas Tungrorum, with the influx of the Tungri and later Salian Franks Germanic tribes. The celtish "Ka Brook", or "by the brook", became "Kabroekse Beek". A Roman coin was found on Meterik's Field, and it has been suggested that the name Meterik originated when a Roman soldier was given land here, but no Roman buildings have been found.

After 515 AD, the area was part of Frankish Austrasia, the Carolingian Empire and the Holy Roman Empire. A Carolingian settlement was found in the Meterik's Field with the floor plans of 23 large and 21 small buildings and four wells dated to 625-1000 AD.

A feudal system of agriculture developed, with farming areas and moving farms in the service of nobility. In the Middle Ages (after 1100 AD) the area became part of the county, the later Duchy, of Guelders. Initial power centers were along the river Maas. In 1326, the nearby castle Huys Ter Horst was founded at the confluence of Kabroekse Beek and Groote Molenbeek. At one point the northern part of the field near Schadijk was in hands of the Van Mirlaer family (Meerlo, closer to the confluence of the Groote Molenbeek and river Maas), while the southern and eastern parts were in hands of the owners of the Huys Ter Horst castle.

Meterik originated from scattered farms surrounding the open field created by these settlements in the late Middle Ages, as have the communities of Schadijk (Limburgish: De Schaak) to the north, and Middelijk (Limburgish: Middelik) and Veld-Oostenrijk (Limburgish: Osterik) in the east. Here, "ijk" refers to the field, but it is unclear how the name Meterik originated. The oldest written reference to 'Meterick' for the area dates to 1483.

In the Middle Ages, Meterik had its own defensive structure, called a "schans", about 0.5 hectares large and consisting of an earthen wall and a flooded ditch with a draw bridge. In 1622, the area is mentioned as the "schansweide". In 1755, a small house was located there, but taken down in 1793 prior to the oldest known modern topographic map of the area being drawn, the Tranchot und v. Mueffling map of 1802–1804. It was probably located in a hidden, vegetated area near the brook at the Donkstraat where long the "Schans" family lived.

Only with political changes after the French conquest in 1794, the abolishment of the noble "heerlijkheden" in 1798, and the later foundation of the United Kingdom of the Netherlands, did the feudal system of moving farms settle into a number of family-owned farms. The names of the families who built those farms are given in the Tranchot map and are still transmitted to later generations in the form of an informal Limburgish name that many locals use, which refers to the name of a farm or place.

Sod heather and dung was used to fertilize the land, raising the elevation of Meterik's Field by about 1.7 meters over time. Peat from the moor was used as fuel. In the heathlands north and east of the field, increased removal of sod heather created a barren landscape with sand dunes, which were planted by fir trees in the 1850s and 1860s to create the 'Schadijker Bossen'. The invention of artificial fertilizer subsequently led to the agricultural development of the remaining heathlands south of the field, leaving a small remnant called "Rotven".

Meterik became a nucleated village at the end of the 19th century, when local farmers obtained permission to establish a church under the condition that they themselves provided income for the priest. Subsequently, a church was established, a house for the priest, and a windmill was brought to the village to generate income for the priest. A school was already present in 1733 and enlarged in 1911 (now a gymnastics hall), while a farmer's union (LLTB) hall was built in 1919 and monastery "St. Theresia" in 1925.

== Church ==
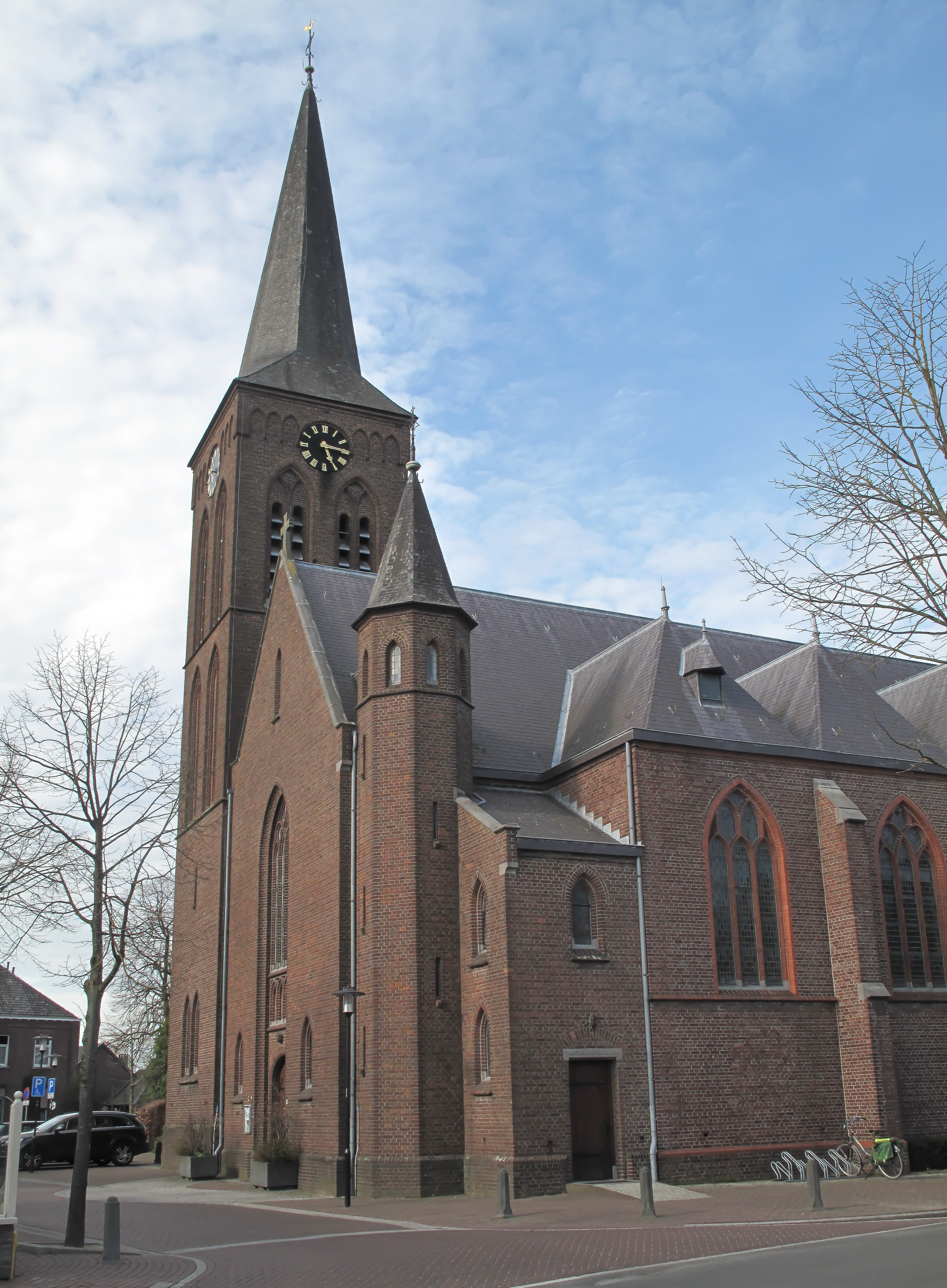
Meterik, The Sint Johannes Evangelistkerk

The Church of Meterik, the Saint John the Evangelist, was built in 1899 designed by the architect Caspar Roermond Franssen. The first priest arrived in 1904. In 1922 his son Joseph Franssen enlarged the design of the Church, as the early chapel had become too small. After having been damaged during World War 2, the current church was built in 1946.

== Parish ==
The Polish, who have settled in large numbers in North Limburg and North Brabant, have their own parish since 2006. It is a so-called categorical parish, which is not bound to a region, but to a group of people. The Polish parish has a Polish priest.
