= Tienray =

Tienray Tiendere Klein Lourdes
- Village
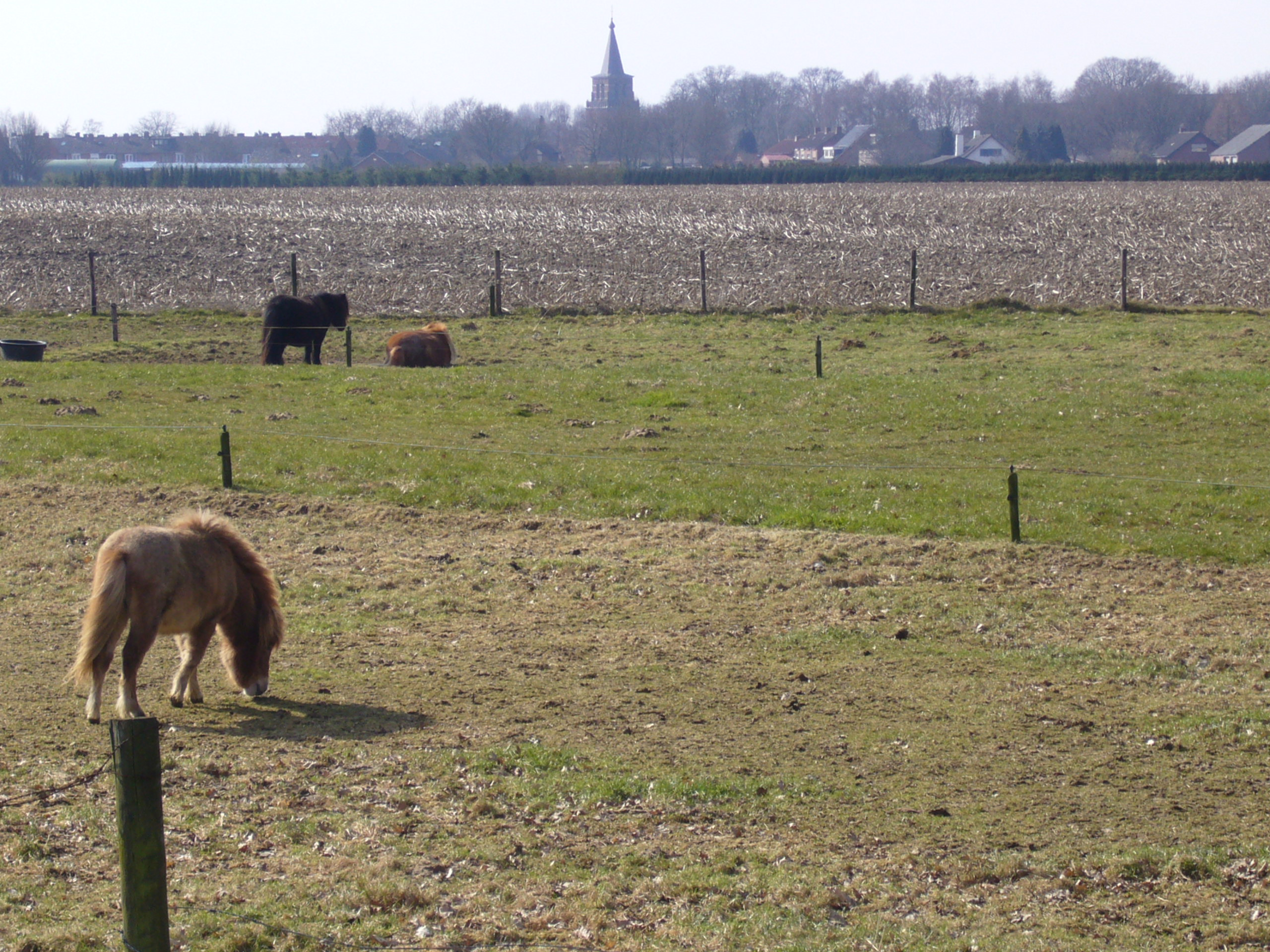
- View on Tienray

- Location in the Netherlands Location in the province of Limburg in the Netherlands
- Coordinates: 51.4939°N 6.0938°E
- Country: Netherlands
- Province: Limburg
- Municipality: Horst aan de Maas

Area
  - Total: 3.35 km^{2} (1.29 sq mi)
- Elevation: 19 m (62 ft)

Population (2021)
  - Total: 1,255
  - Density: 375/km^{2} (970/sq mi)
- Time zone: UTC+1 (CET)
  - Summer (DST): UTC+2 (CEST)
- Postal code: 5865
- Dialing code: 0478

Tienray (Limburgish: Tiendere) is a village in the Dutch province of Limburg. It is a part of the municipality of Horst aan de Maas, and is located about 15 kilometres (9.3 mi) north of Venlo.

Tienray is a site of pilgrimage dedicated to Our Lady of Lourdes since the 15th century. In 1877, Tienray was officially permitted to use the title Klein Lourdes (Little Lourdes) by papal order.

== History ==
The village was first mentioned between 1324 and 1364 as Tedenrade, meaning "forest cultivation of Tedo or Tiedo (person)". Tienray developed in the Middle Ages on newly cultivated land. It used to belong to the Land van Kessel. In 1442, a Lady chapel was built in Tienray which became a site of pilgrimage.

In 1580, the village became part of Spanish Guelders. In 1713, after the War of the Spanish Succession, it became part of Prussia. In 1794, Tienray was conquered by France, and became part of the United Kingdom of the Netherlands in 1815. In 1830, the area chose the side of Belgium during the Belgian Revolution, but was definitely awarded to the Netherlands in 1839.

The Catholic Our Lady Comforter of the Oppressed Church is a cruciform church built between 1949 and 1950 as a replacement of the 1944 church which was destroyed by the Germans. Between 1982 and 1983, a replica of the destroyed Lourdes cave from 1888 was added to the church. The statue of Mary was hidden by the priest in October 1944 and has survived the war.

Tienray was home to 54 people in 1840. In 1883, a joint railway station with Meerlo opened on the Nijmegen to Venlo railway line. The station closed in 1940. The village was severely damaged during World War II. A resistance monument has placed to honour Hanna van de Voort, a maternity nurse who lived in Tienray at the time. Van de Voort found hiding places for 143 Jewish children most of whom survived the war.

== Mary pilgrimage ==
According to legend, a hermit fell ill and discovered the Mary chapel. He recovered and maintained the chapel. The legend is later addition and is not recorded in older sources. The earliest recording of a pilgrimage to Tienray dates from 1440. During the 18th century, 14 processions per year were organised to Tienray. Between 1877 and 1878, the chapel was replaced by a church, and in 1887, a Lourdes cave was added. After the destruction of the church, an emergency church was established in the local hotel.

== Gallery ==
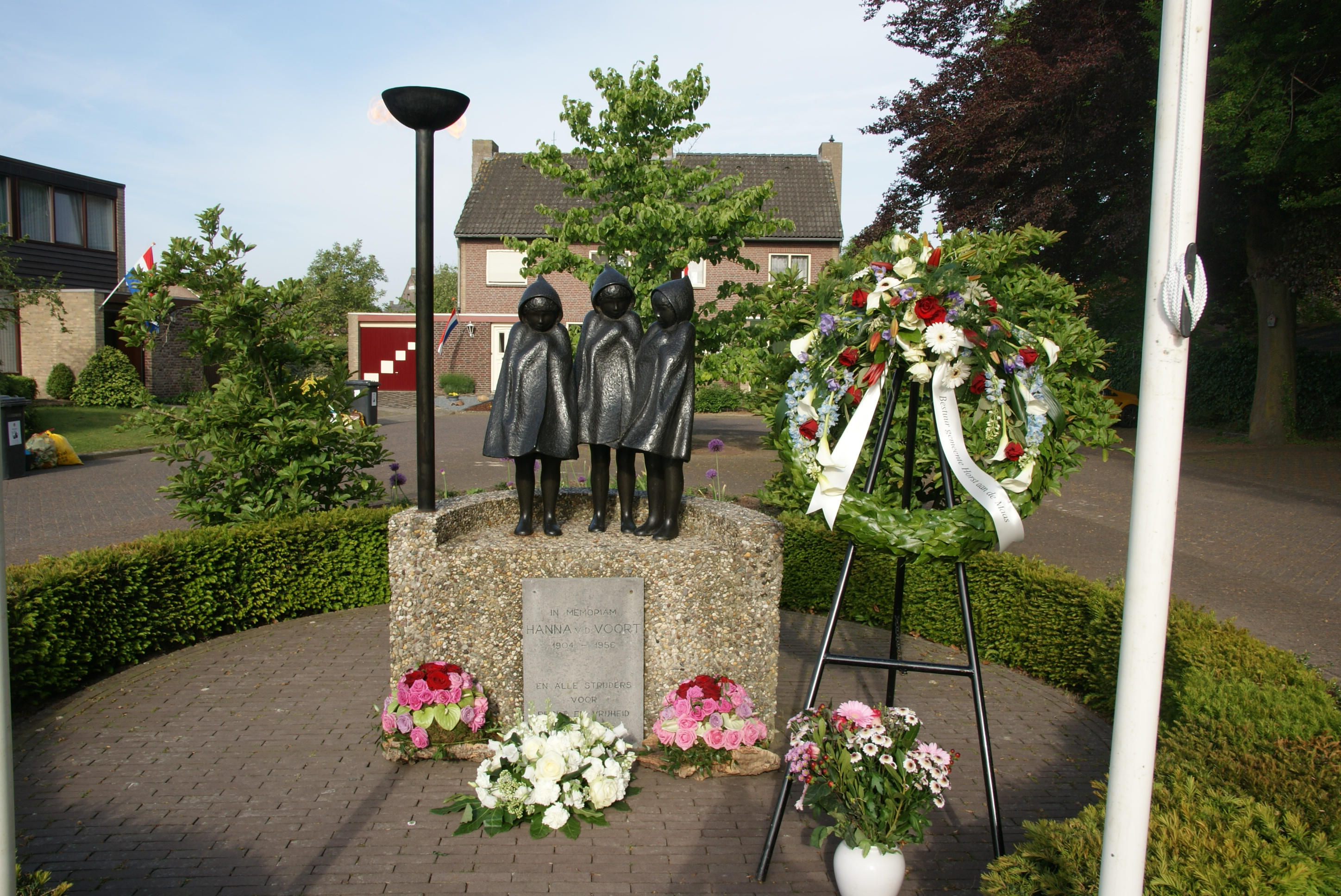
Resistance monument

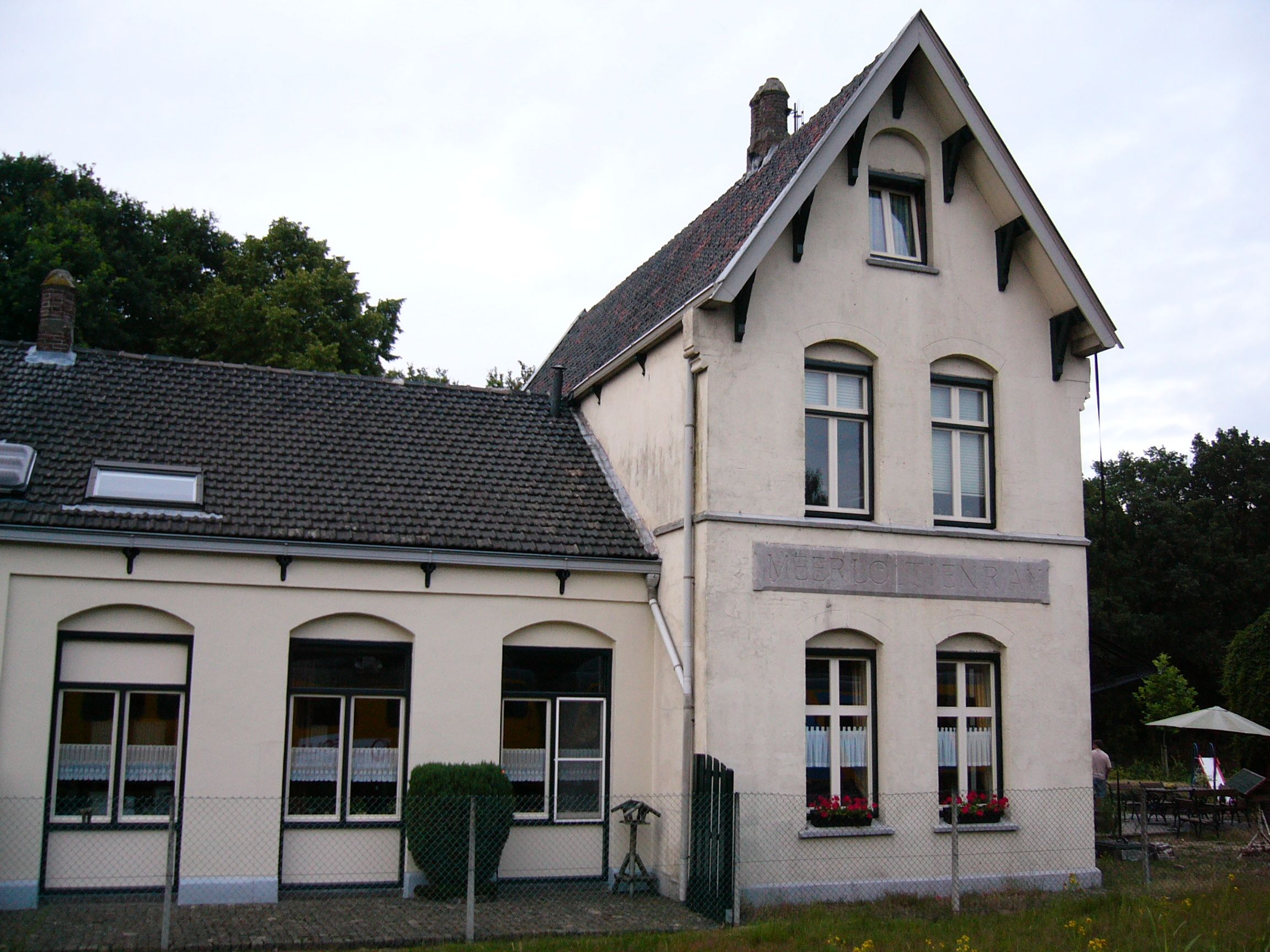
Former railway station Meerlo-Tienray

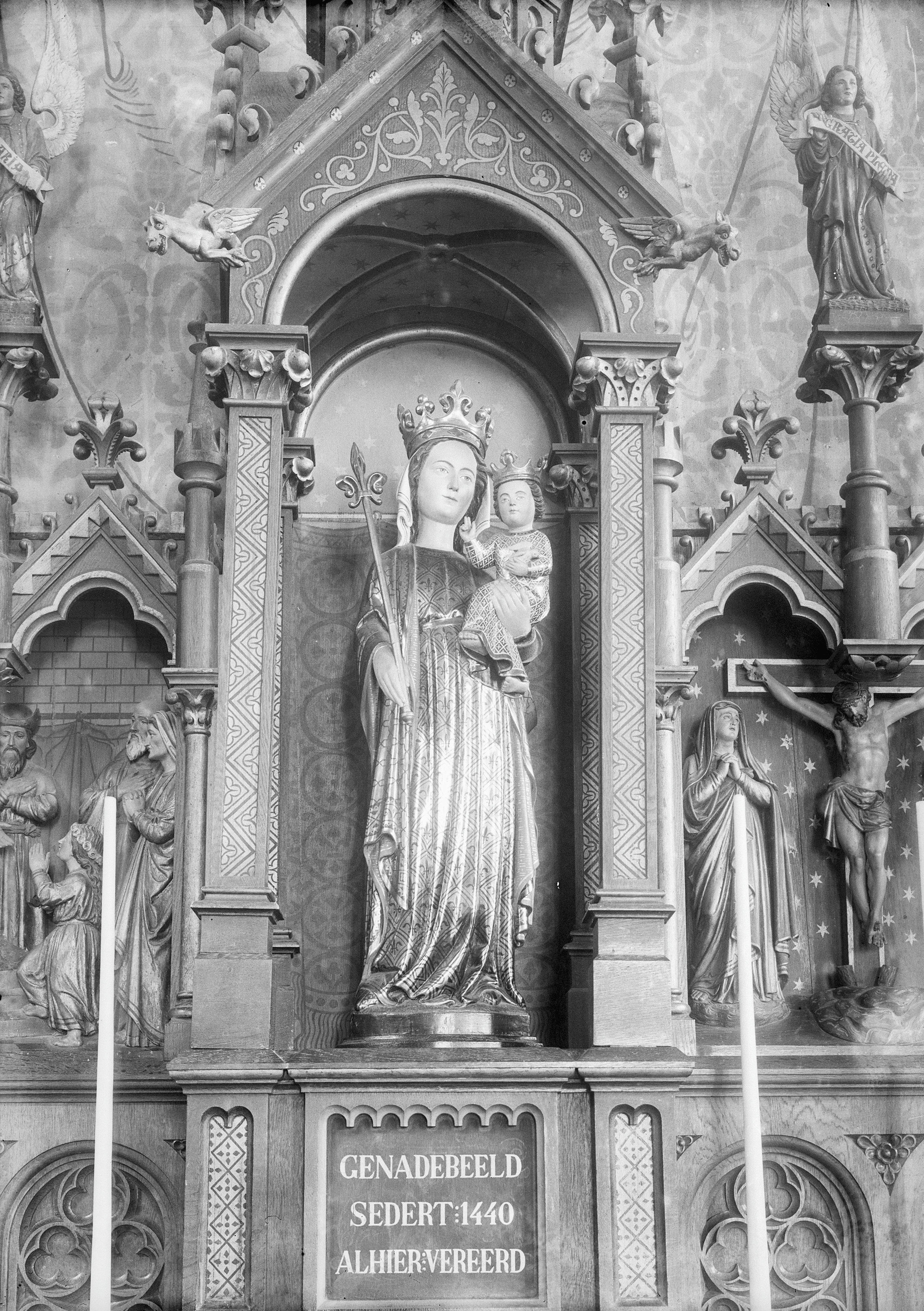
Mary statue (1926)
