= Broekhuizenvorst =

Broekhuizenvorst Vors
- Village
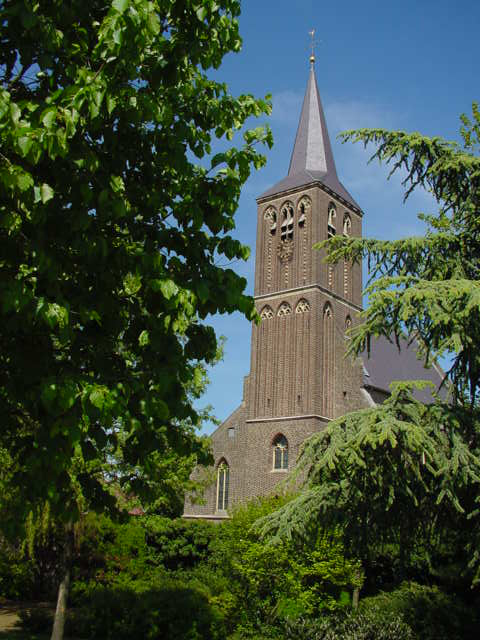
- Holy Name of Jesus Church

- Location in the Netherlands Location in the province of Limburg in the Netherlands
- Coordinates: 51°29′39″N 6°9′32″E
- Country: Netherlands
- Province: Limburg
- Municipality: Horst aan de Maas

Area
  - Total: 0.40 km^{2} (0.15 sq mi)
- Elevation: 17 m (56 ft)

Population (2021)
  - Total: 850
  - Density: 2,100/km^{2} (5,500/sq mi)
- Time zone: UTC+1 (CET)
  - Summer (DST): UTC+2 (CEST)
- Postal code: 5871
- Dialing code: 077

Broekhuizenvorst is a village in the Dutch province of Limburg. It is a part of the municipality of Horst aan de Maas and lies 18 km north of Venlo.

The village was first mentioned in 1294 or 1295 as "apud Vorste", and means "not fenced off forest near Broekhuizen". Broekhuizen was added to distinguish from Grubbenvorst. Broekhuizenvorst developed on the Maas in the Early Middle Ages. It used to be part of the Land van Kessel. In 1323, it became part of the Duchy of Guelders. In 1648, it became part of the Spanish Netherlands. In 1673, it became an independent parish. In 1713, it belonged to Prussia, and finally in 1815, it became part of the Kingdom of the Netherlands.

The Holy Name of Jesus Church is a short double-aisled church. Its existence was already recorded in 1214. In the 13th century, the tower was added. It was enlarged in the 15th century. In 1944, the tower was blown up, and the church was rebuilt between 1948 and 1949.

Broekhuizenvorst was home to 436 people in 1840.
