= Kronenberg, Netherlands =

Kronenberg De Kroeënenberg
- Village
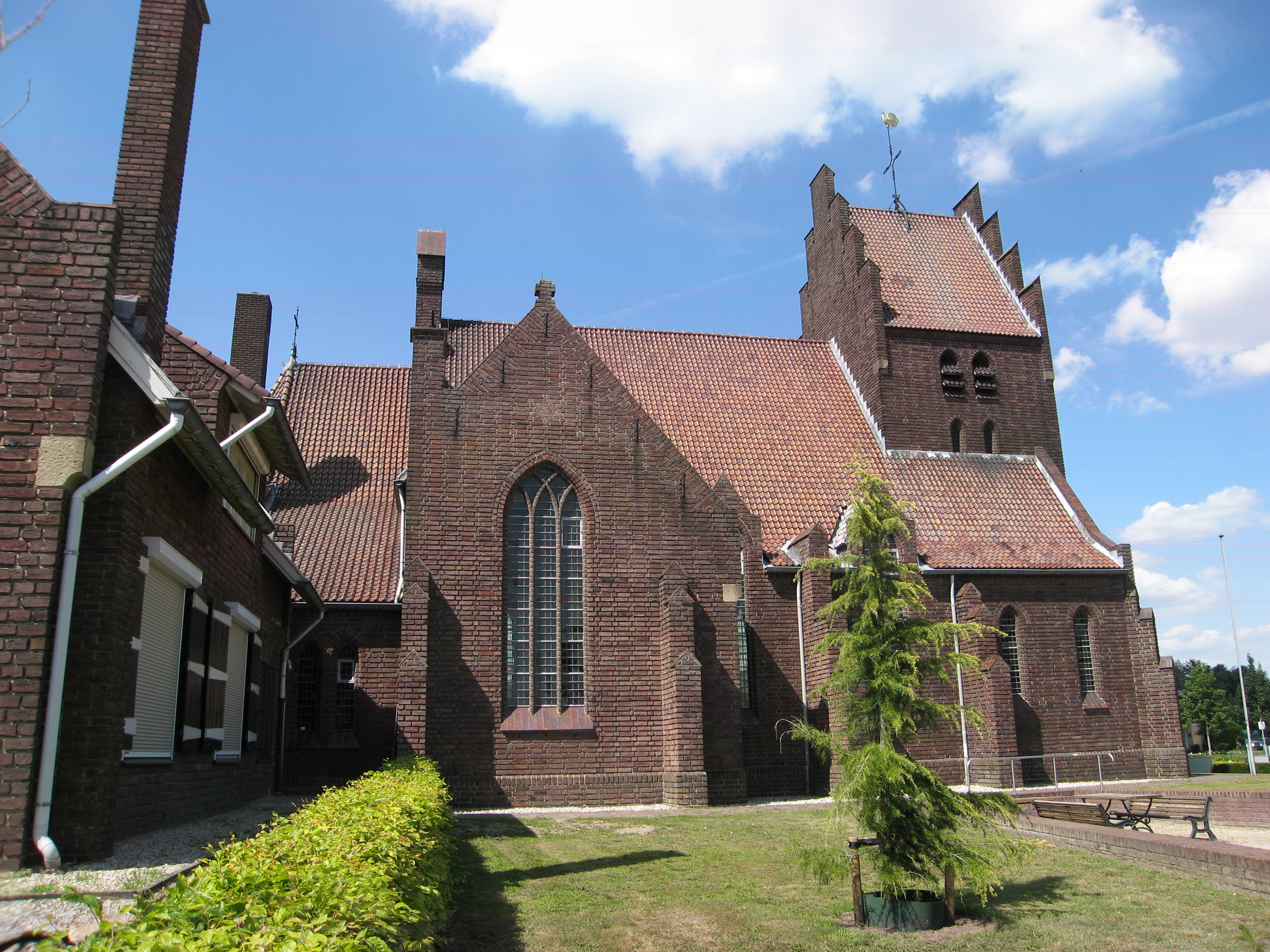
- Church in Kronenberg

- Location in the Netherlands Location in the province of Limburg in the Netherlands
- Coordinates: 51.4141°N 5.9996°E
- Country: Netherlands
- Province: Limburg
- Municipality: Horst aan de Maas

Area
  - Total: 7.86 km^{2} (3.03 sq mi)
- Elevation: 28 m (92 ft)

Population (2025)
  - Total: 1,125
  - Density: 143/km^{2} (371/sq mi)
- Time zone: UTC+1 (CET)
  - Summer (DST): UTC+2 (CEST)
- Postal code: 5976
- Dialing code: 077

Kronenberg (Limburgish: De Kroeënenberg) is a village in southeastern Netherlands. It is located in the municipality of Horst aan de Maas, Limburg, about 13 km northwest of Venlo. It used to be part of the former municipality Sevenum, with Evertsoord.

In 1932, a parish was established in Kronenberg. A large part of the amusement park Toverland is located on Kronenberg's territory, as well as Peelbergen Equestrian Centre.

== Notable people ==
- Paul Verhaegh (born 1983), footballer
