= Hegelsom =

- Village
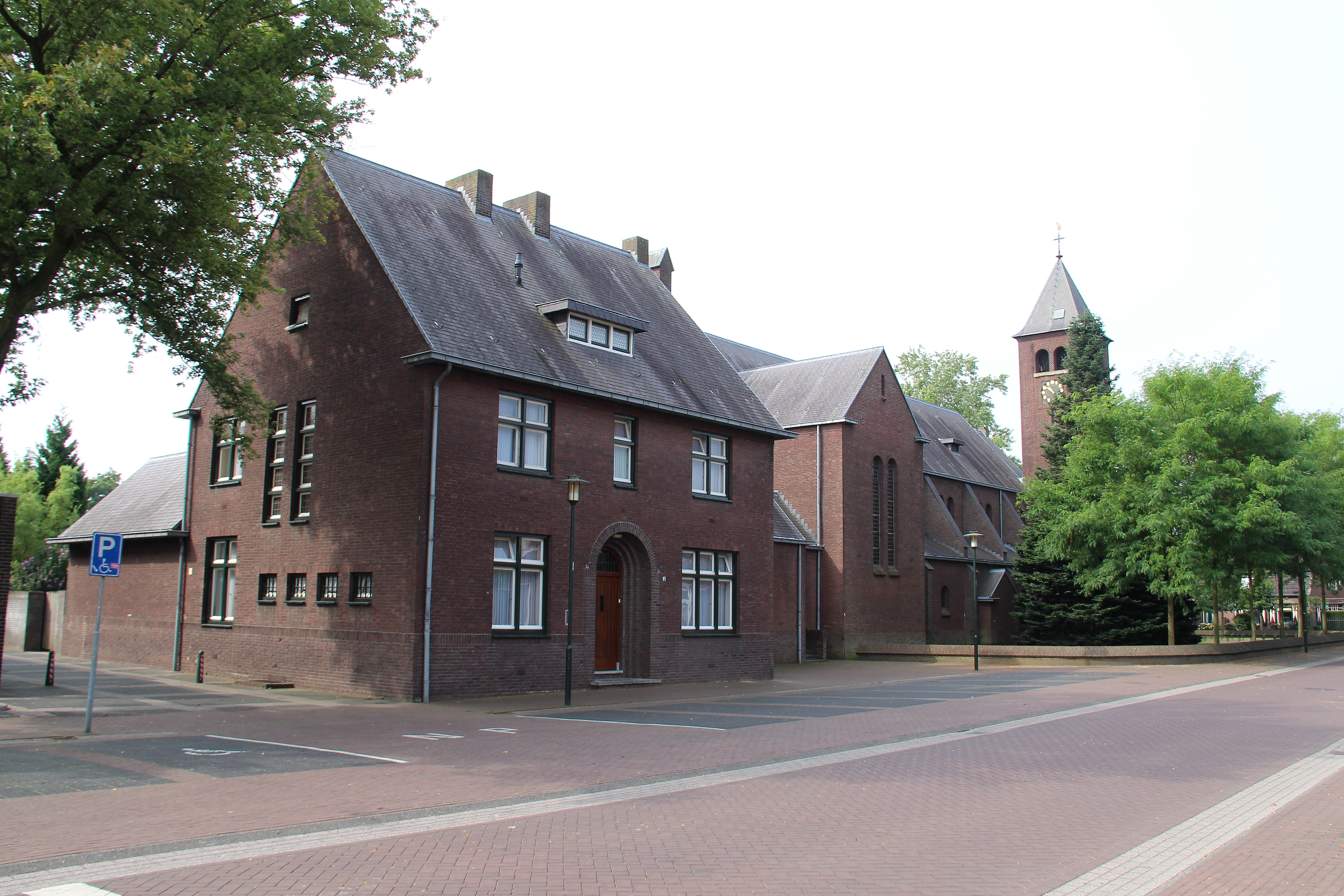
- Street view

- Location in the Netherlands Location in the province of Limburg in the Netherlands
- Coordinates: 51°26′24″N 6°2′15″E
- Country: Netherlands
- Province: Limburg
- Municipality: Horst aan de Maas

Area
  - Total: 6.47 km^{2} (2.50 sq mi)
- Elevation: 26 m (85 ft)

Population (2021)
  - Total: 1,965
  - Density: 304/km^{2} (787/sq mi)
- Time zone: UTC+1 (CET)
  - Summer (DST): UTC+2 (CEST)
- Postal code: 5963
- Dialing code: 077

Hegelsom (Limburgish: Haegelsem) is a village in the Dutch province of Limburg. It is located in the municipality of Horst aan de Maas.

The village was first mentioned in 1424 as Heugelsem, and means "settlement of Hegel (person)". Hegelsom developed in the 19th century as a heath excavation village. Hegelsom was home to 280 people in 1840.

== Notable people ==
- Raymond Knops (b. 1971), politician

== Gallery ==
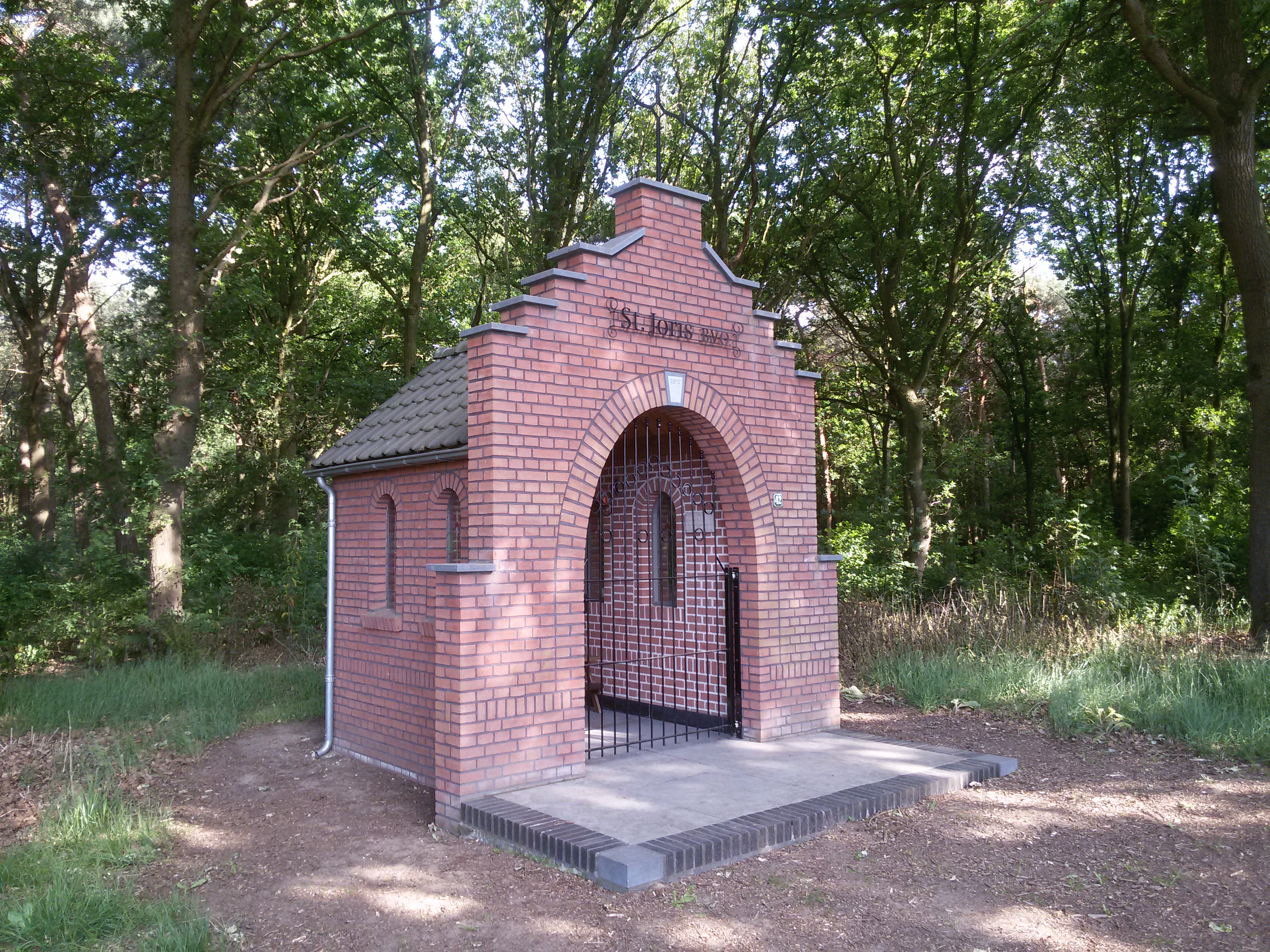
St Joris chapel

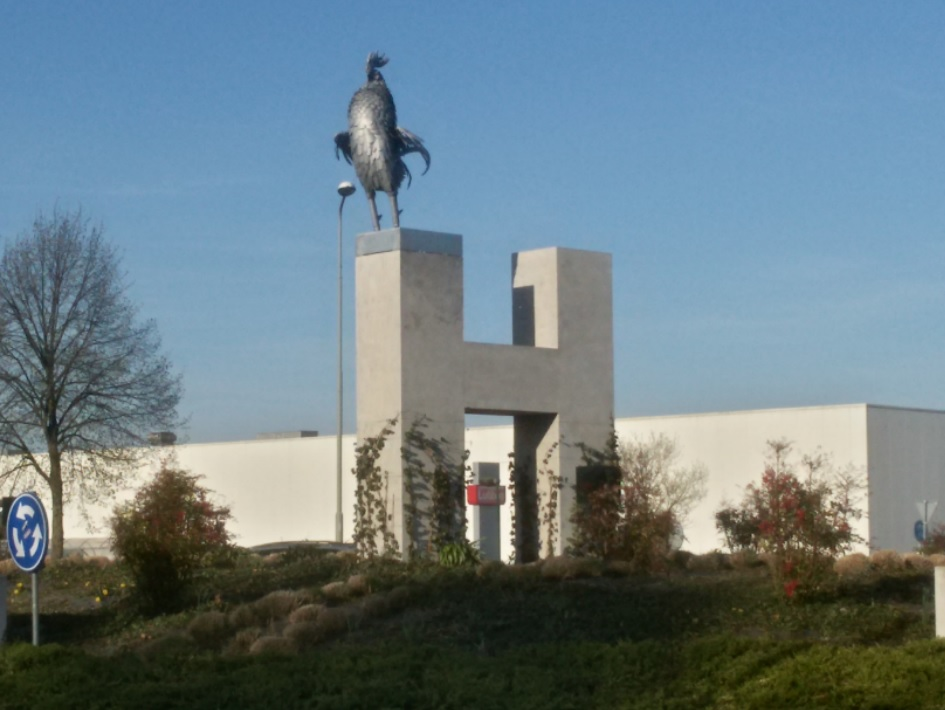
A rooster statue on a roundabout
