= Lottum =

- Village
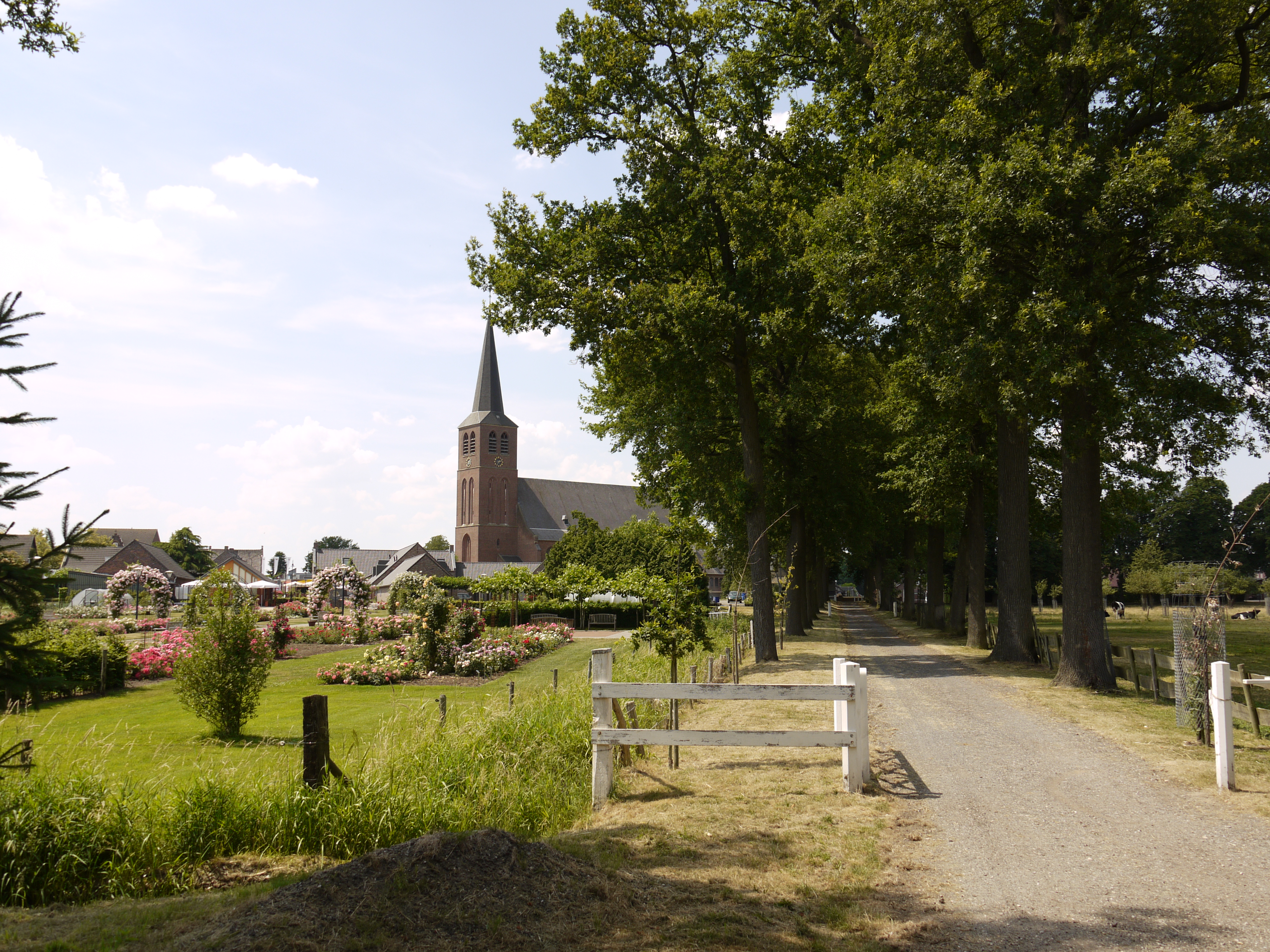
- Driveway of De Borggraaf, a castle in Lottum.

- Location in the Netherlands Location in the province of Limburg in the Netherlands
- Coordinates: 51°27′37″N 6°9′35″E
- Country: Netherlands
- Province: Limburg
- Municipality: Horst aan de Maas

Area
  - Total: 16.45 km^{2} (6.35 sq mi)
- Elevation: 19 m (62 ft)

Population (2021)
  - Total: 1,990
  - Density: 121/km^{2} (313/sq mi)
- Time zone: UTC+1 (CET)
  - Summer (DST): UTC+2 (CEST)
- Postal code: 5973
- Dialing code: 077

Lottum (Dutch pronunciation: [ˈlɔtʏm]) is a village in the Dutch province of Limburg. It is located in the municipality of Horst aan de Maas.

== History ==
The village was first mentioned around 1100 as "de Lutmo". The etymology is unclear. Lottum developed along the Maas in the Middle Ages. Up to 1563, the heerlijkheid was part of the St Quirinus Abbey in Neuss. In 1648, it became part of the Spanish Guelders. In 1815, it became part of the Kingdom of the Netherlands.

The Catholic St Gertrudis Church is a three-aisled, basilica-like church which was built in 1950 and 1951 as a replacement of the 15th century-church which was blown up in 1944. The tower was added in 1958–1959.

De Borggraaf Castle dates from the 16th century and has a double moat. The U-shaped lower court was added in 1736 and the square north tower was the final addition in 1926.

Lottum was home to 241 people in 1840. In 1883, a railway station opened on the Nijmegen to Venlo railway line. It closed in 1938. The building was demolished in 1973.

Lottum has become a rose village. About 70% of all the Dutch roses are grown in Lottum.

== Notable people ==
- Roel van Helden

== Gallery ==
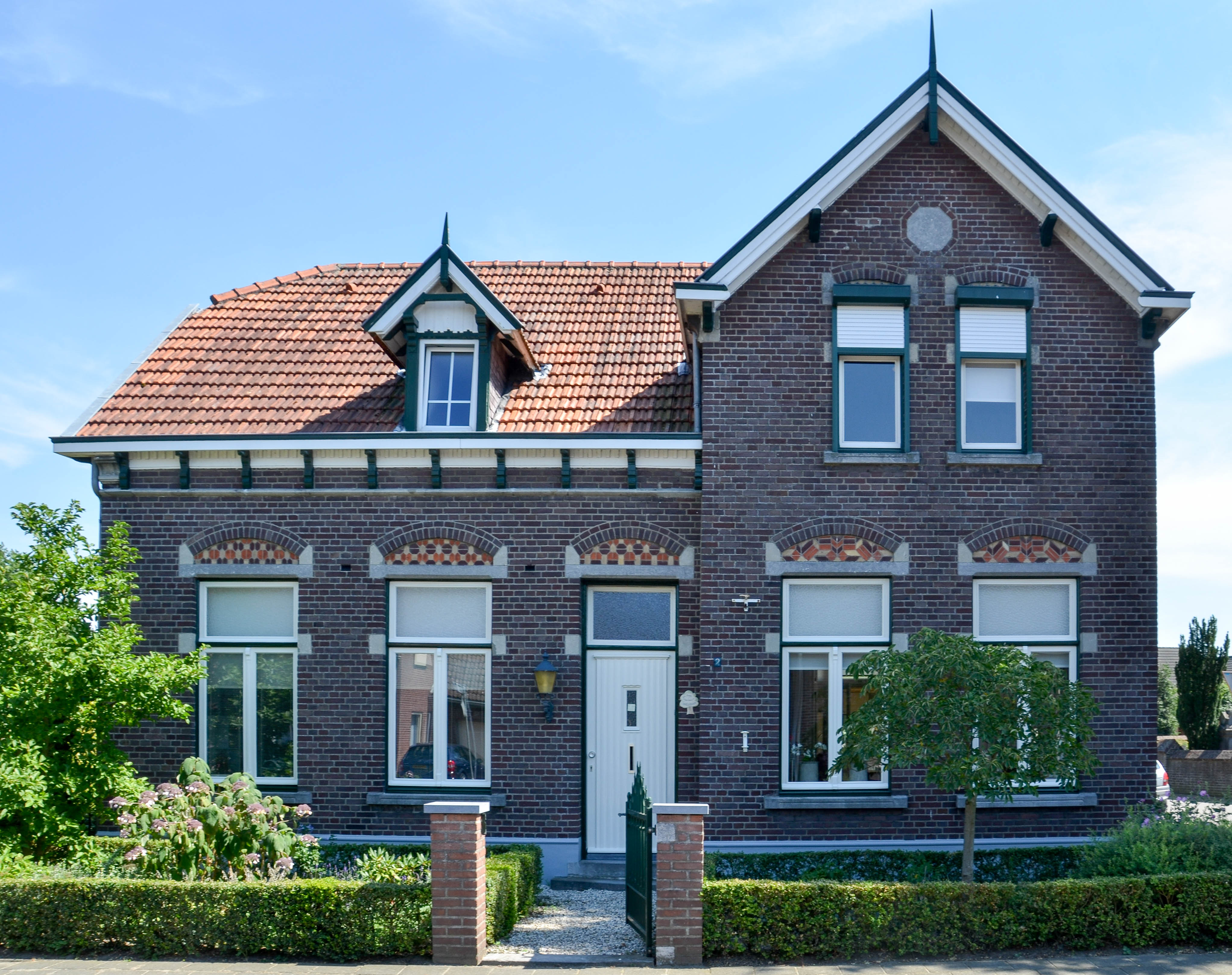
House in Lottum

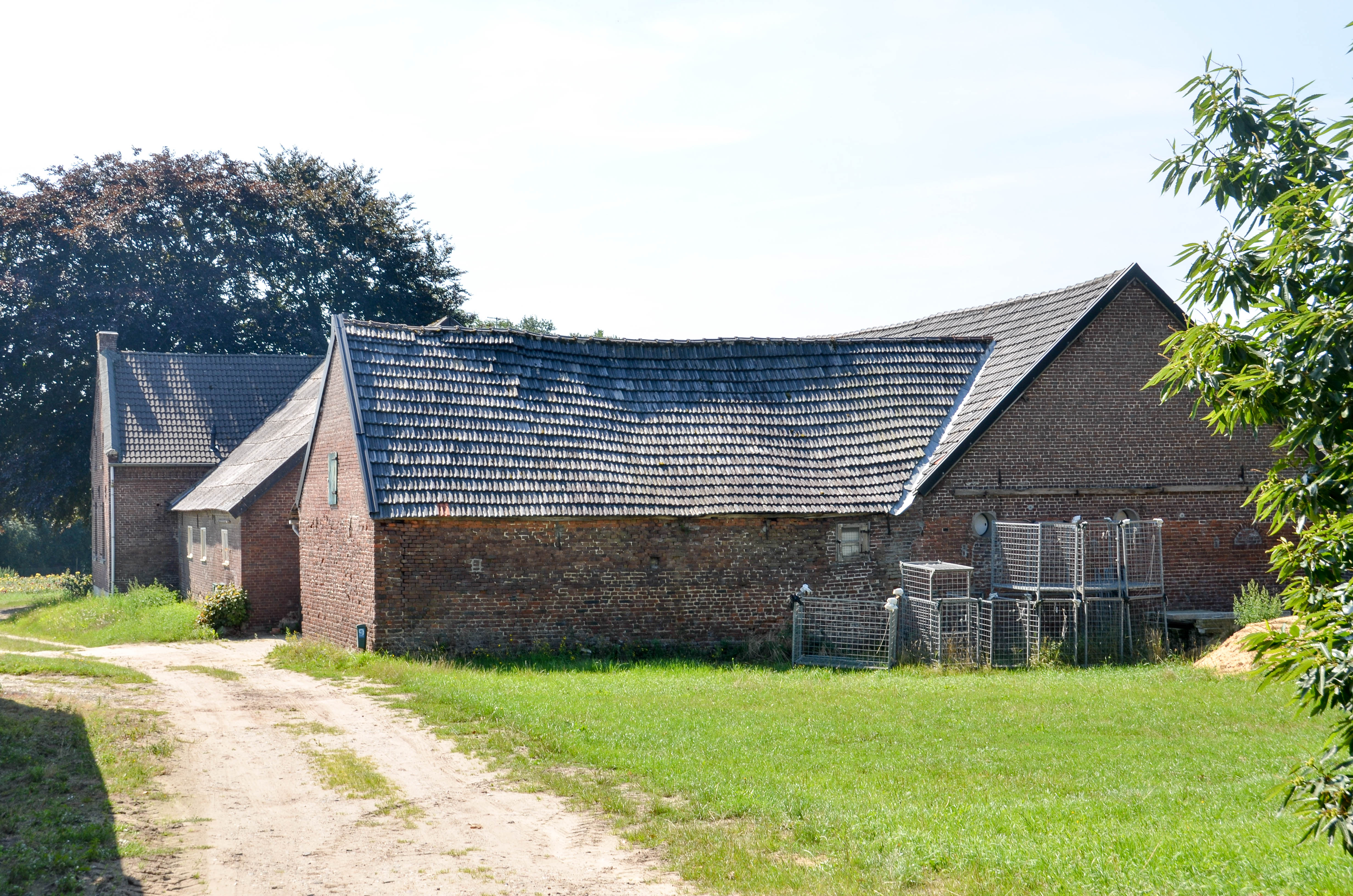
Farm in Lottum

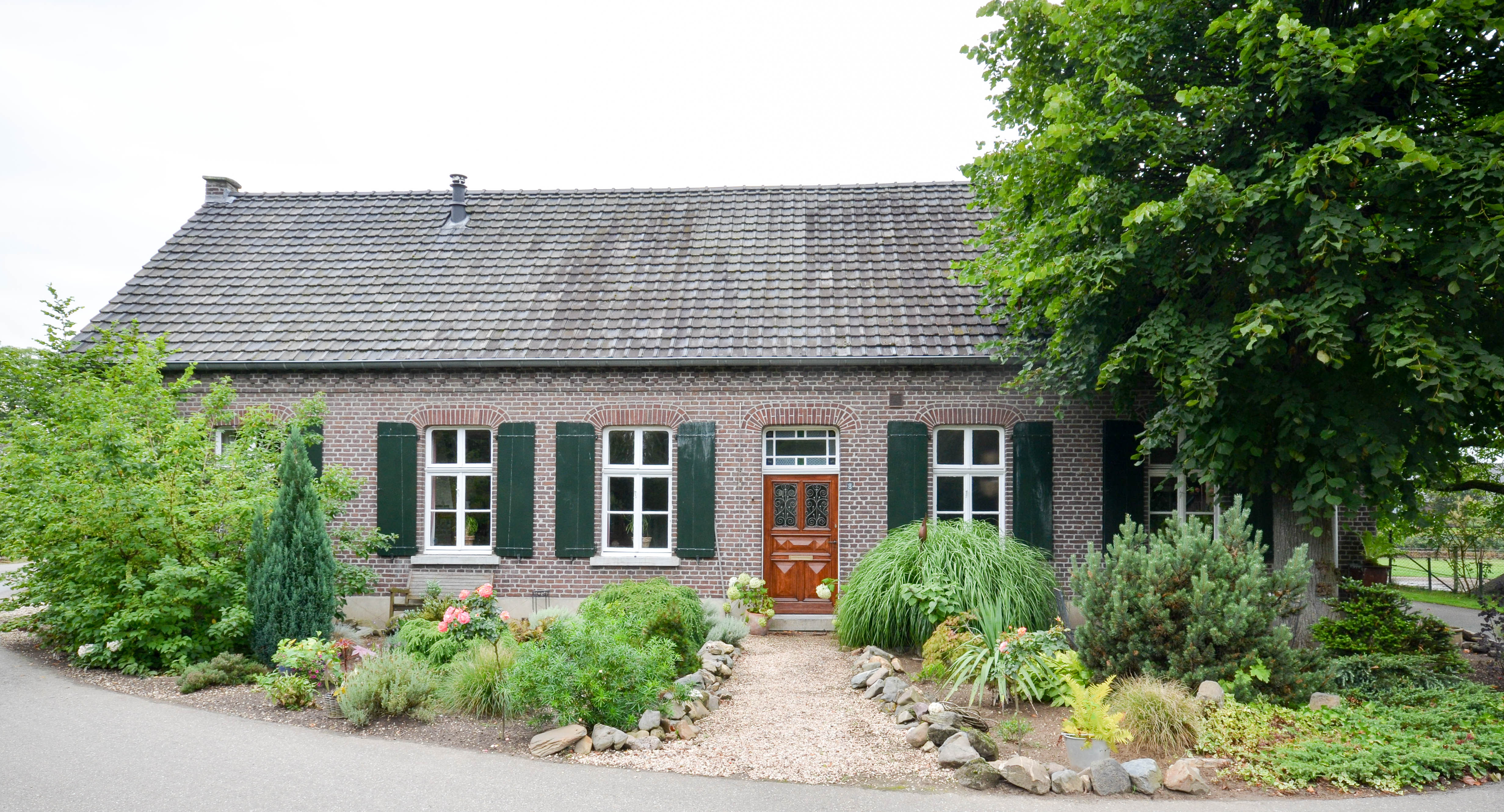
Farm in Lottum

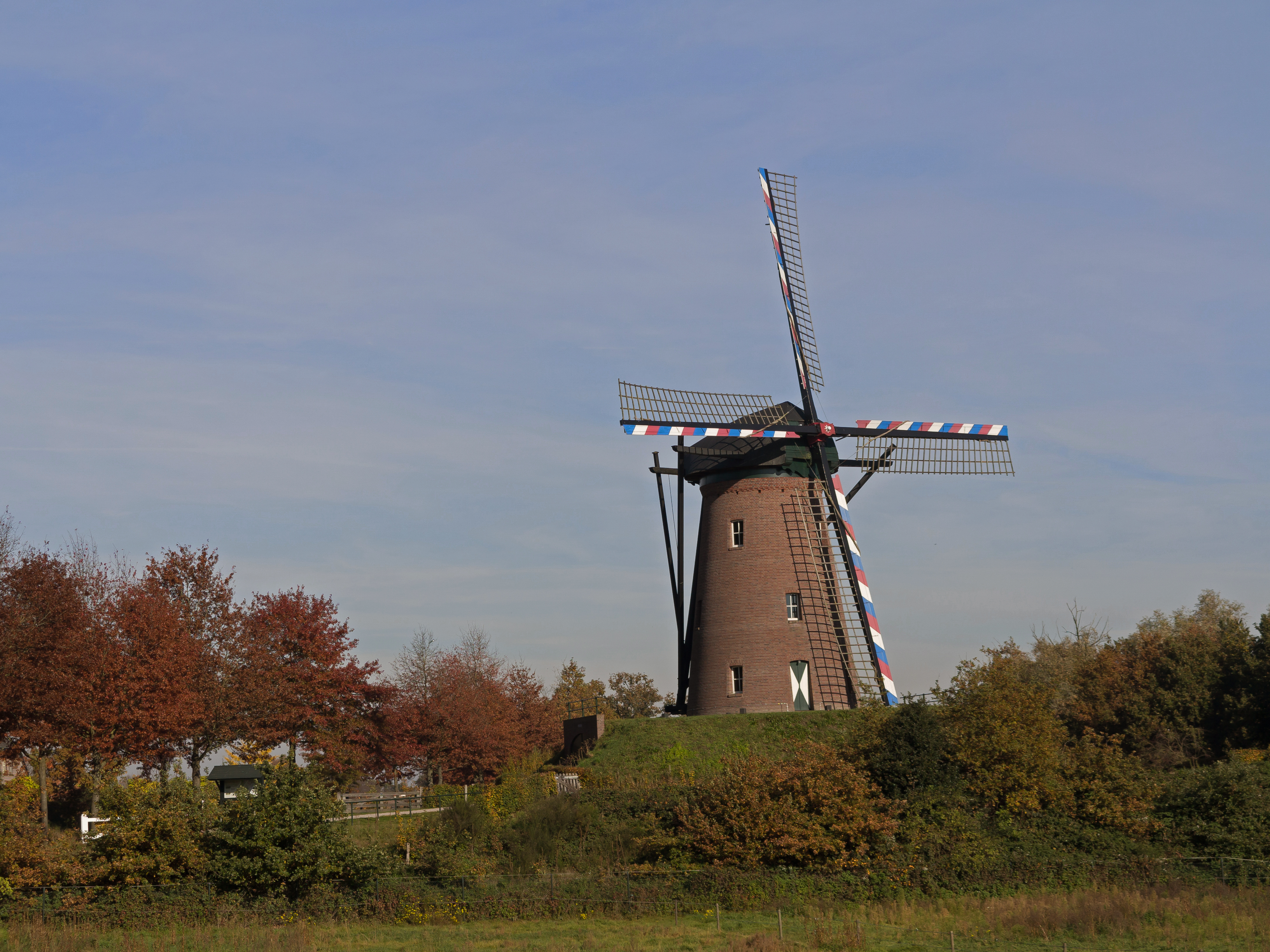
Windmill Houthuizer molen
