= Meerlo =

- Village
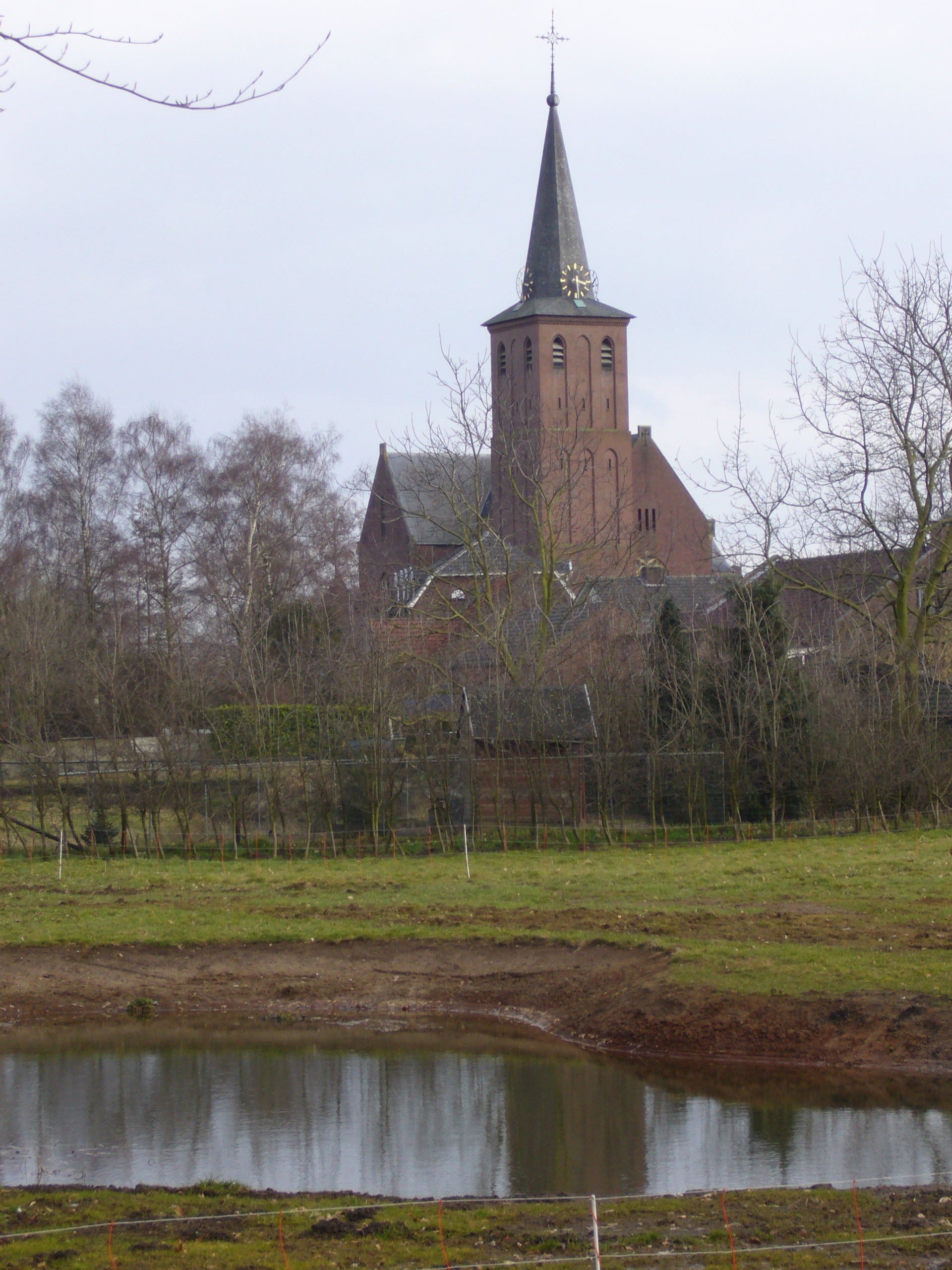
- RK Kerk Sint Johannes de Doper Meerlo

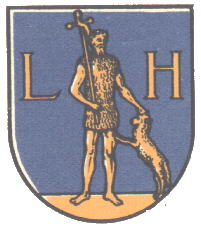
- Coat of arms

- Location in the Netherlands Location in the province of Limburg in the Netherlands
- Coordinates: 51°30′43″N 6°5′8″E
- Country: Netherlands
- Province: Limburg
- Municipality: Horst aan de Maas

Area
  - Total: 7.97 km^{2} (3.08 sq mi)
- Elevation: 16 m (52 ft)

Population (2021)
  - Total: 1,845
  - Density: 231/km^{2} (600/sq mi)
- Time zone: UTC+1 (CET)
  - Summer (DST): UTC+2 (CEST)
- Postal code: 5864
- Dialing code: 0478

Meerlo is a village in the Dutch province of Limburg. It is located in the municipality of Horst aan de Maas.

== History ==
The village was first mentioned in the 1180s as Mirlare. The village name is a combination of "forest pasture" and swamp. Meerlo developed in the Middle Ages along the Grote Molenbeek. In 1485, it became an independent parish. In 1648, it became part of Spanish Guelders. In 1713, it went to Prussia, and finally in 1815, it became part of the Kingdom of the Netherlands.

The Meerlo Castle existed before 1230. It was destroyed in 1580, rebuilt in 1619, and burnt down in 1752. The count of Hatzfeldt ordered rebuilding of the farms on the castle ground which are now known as 't Kasteeltje (little castle).

The Catholic John the Baptist Church is a three-aisled church with the tower at the side. It was built in 1934 and 1935 to replace the church from around 1500. In 1944, the tower was blown up and rebuilt in 1954.

Meerlo was home to 520 people in 1840. It was an independent municipality until 1969. It was the seat of the former municipality Meerlo-Wanssum until 2010 when it was merged into Horst aan de Maas.

== Gallery ==
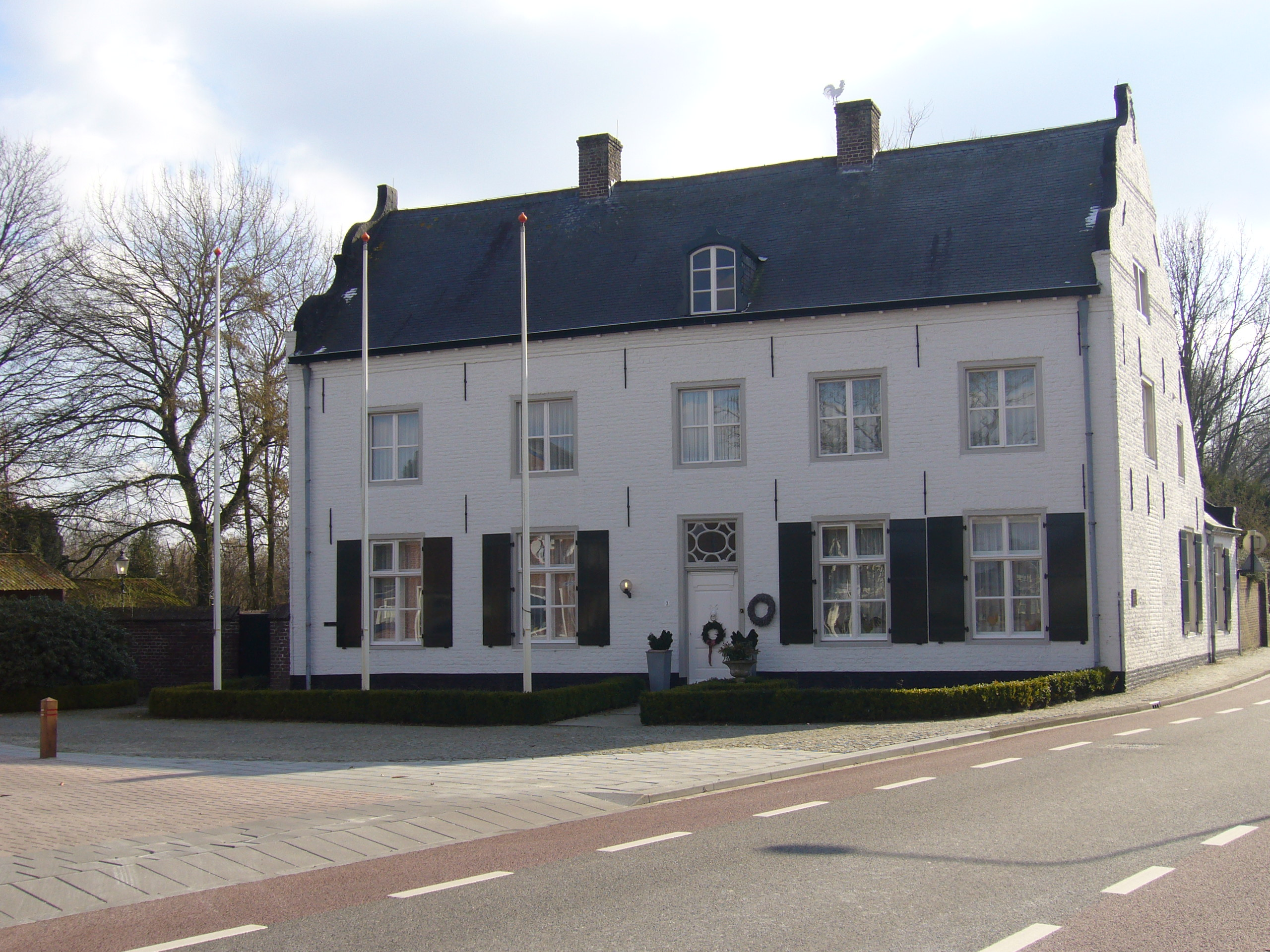
Villa in Meerlo

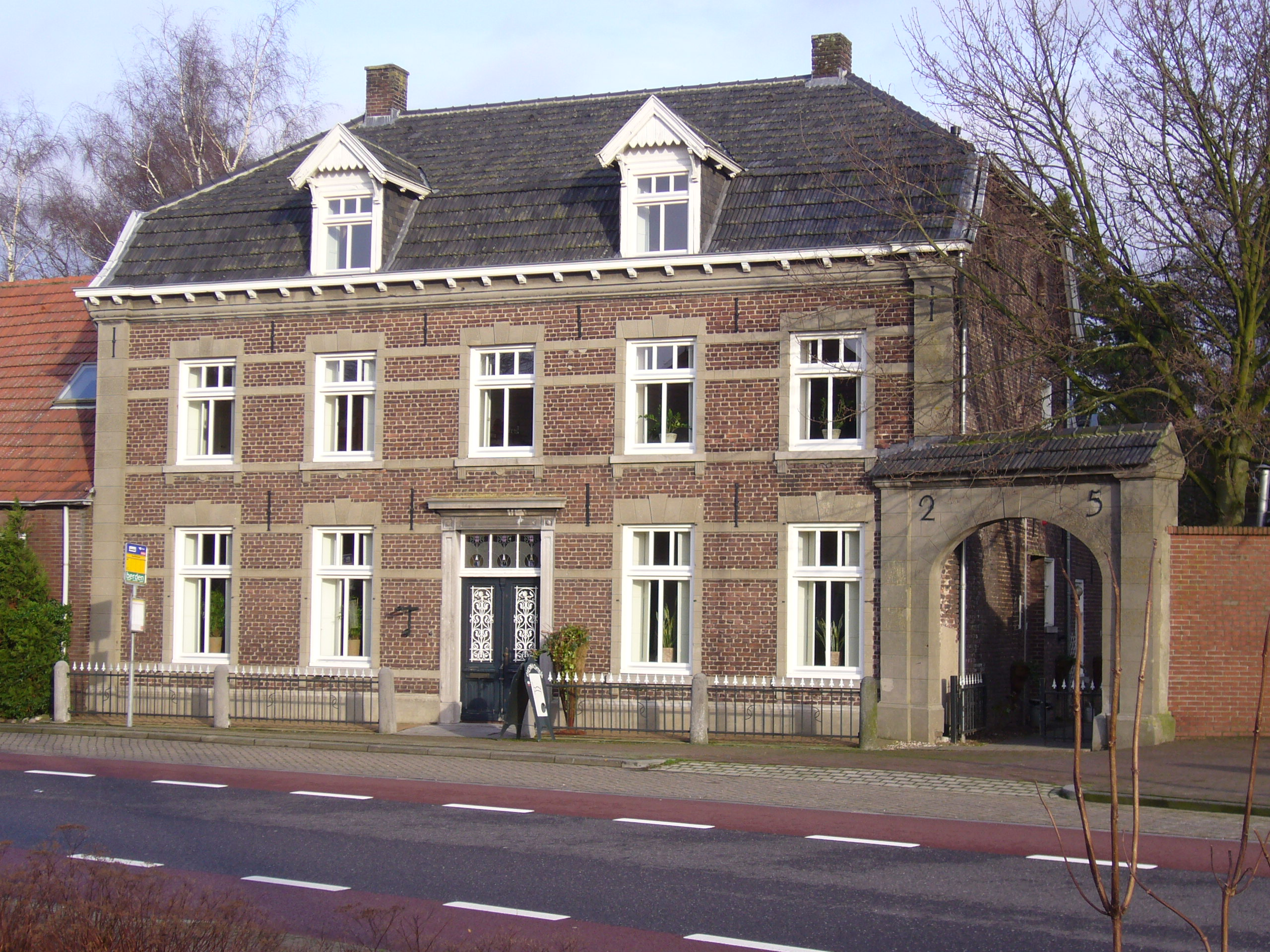
House in Meerlo

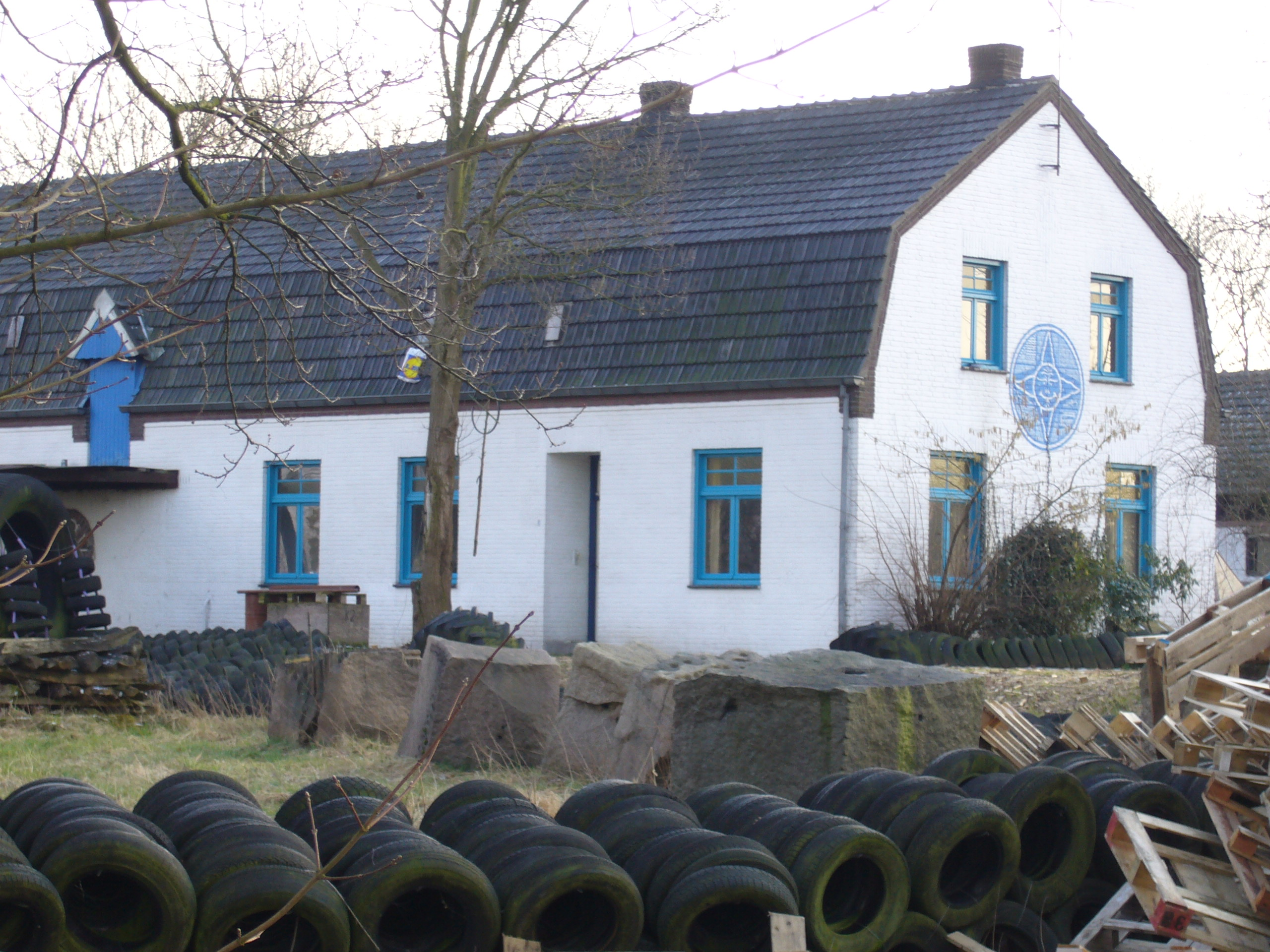
Farm in Meerlo

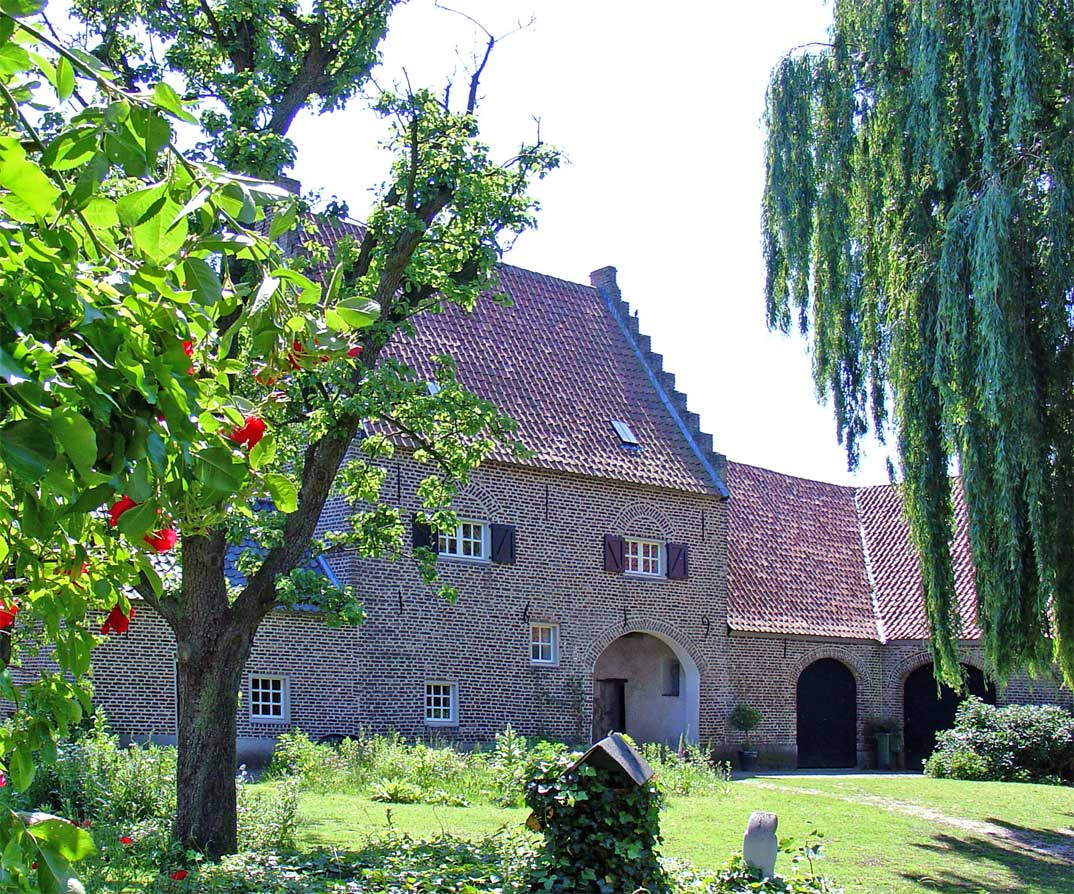
Farm 't Kasteelke
