= Buwalda =

Buwalda is a Dutch surname. Notable people with the surname include:

- John Peter Buwalda (1886–1954), American geologist
- Peter Buwalda (born 1971), Dutch novelist and journalist
- Robin Buwalda (born 1994), Dutch footballer
- Sytse Buwalda (born 1965), Dutch counter-tenor
- William Buwalda (1869–1946), American soldier
