= Zomergasten =

Dutch television show

- Genre: Interview
- Created by: Krijn ter Braak
- Directed by: Edith Ruyg
- Presented by: Janine Abbring (2017-2022, 2024, 2026) (Note: Adriaan van Dis was set to host the 37th season in 2024, but due to health issues, each episode was taken over by a different host.); Griet Op de Beeck (2025); Jelle Brandt Corstius (2010-2011, 2024); Margriet van der Linden (2009, 2024); Joris Luyendijk (2006-2007, 2024); Hanneke Groenteman (1998, 2024); Peter van Ingen (1988-1995, 2024); Theo Maassen (2023); Thomas Erdbrink (2016); Wilfried de Jong (2013-2015); Jan Leyers (2012); Bas Heijne (2008); Paul de Leeuw (2007); Connie Palmen (2005); Joost Zwagerman (2003-2004); Adriaan van Dis (1999-2002); Wim T. Schippers (1997); Freek de Jonge (1996)
- Music by: Bugge Wesseltoft
- Country of origin: Netherlands
- Original language: Dutch
- No. of seasons: 39

Production
- Producer: Jenny Borger
- Production locations: Studio B Bussum (1988-1989); Studio Plantage (1990-2010); Media Park Hilversum (2011-2022); Muziekgebouw aan 't IJ (2023-2024); Schram Studio's (2025)
- Editors: Ralf Verbeek; Peter van Ingen
- Running time: ±3 hours

Original release
- Network: VPRO (NPO 2)

Zomergasten ("Summer guests", an allusion to migratory birds) was a Dutch television programme broadcast each summer by VPRO on NPO 2.

The programme was first aired in 1988. Each episode takes up an entire Sunday evening. It consists of an in-depth studio interview, typically three hours long, with a notable Dutch, Belgian or other Dutch-speaking foreigner, interspersed with cinema or television footage selected by the guest, which is subsequently discussed. Guests include writers, scientists, television personalities, politicians or business people. After the interview is finished, a movie selected by the guest is broadcast on the same channel.

Zomergasten has become one of the signature programmes of Dutch public television. VPRO has organized live public screenings of Zomergasten in arthouse cinemas. In 2017, several venues in Amsterdam organised public screenings of the Zomergasten edition featuring Amsterdam mayor Eberhard van der Laan.

In December 2025, broadcaster VPRO announced that the 39th season in 2026 will be the last, due to cutbacks in the NPO budget. In April 2026, Arjen Lubach announced that Janine Abbring would return as host for the final season. She previously hosted from 2017 until 2022 and one episode in 2024.

== Episodes ==
Season	Airdate	Guest	Host
1 (1988)	3 July	Pierre Janssen	Peter van Ingen
1 (1988)	10 July	Renate Rubinstein	Peter van Ingen
1 (1988)	17 July	Pieter Verhoeff	Peter van Ingen
1 (1988)	24 July	G.B.J. Hiltermann	Peter van Ingen
1 (1988)	31 July	Sienie Strikwerda	Peter van Ingen
2 (1989)	4 June	Loe de Jong	Peter van Ingen
2 (1989)	11 June	Andrée van Es	Peter van Ingen
2 (1989)	18 June	Louis Andriessen	Peter van Ingen
2 (1989)	25 June	Joop van Tijn	Peter van Ingen
3 (1990)	3 June	Henk Hofland	Peter van Ingen
3 (1990)	10 June	Adelheid Roosen	Peter van Ingen
3 (1990)	17 June	Rob Scholte	Peter van Ingen
3 (1990)	24 June	Hugo Claus	Peter van Ingen
4 (1991)	2 June	Armando	Peter van Ingen
4 (1991)	9 June	Jan Wolkers	Peter van Ingen
4 (1991)	16 June	Jacqueline de Gier	Peter van Ingen
4 (1991)	23 June	Willem Breuker	Peter van Ingen
4 (1991)	30 June	Piet Vroon	Peter van Ingen
5 (1992)	31 May	Renée Soutendijk	Peter van Ingen
5 (1992)	7 June	Charlotte Mutsaers	Peter van Ingen
5 (1992)	14 June	Frank van Ree	Peter van Ingen
5 (1992)	21 June	Anil Ramdas	Peter van Ingen
5 (1992)	28 June	Ischa Meijer	Peter van Ingen
6 (1993)	4 July	Ernst van de Wetering	Peter van Ingen
6 (1993)	11 July	Ian Buruma	Peter van Ingen
6 (1993)	18 July	Lieve Joris	Peter van Ingen
6 (1993)	25 July	Jan Mulder	Peter van Ingen
7 (1994)	24 July	Frans Swarttouw	Peter van Ingen
7 (1994)	31 July	Ton Alberts	Peter van Ingen
7 (1994)	7 August	Isabelle van Keulen	Peter van Ingen
7 (1994)	14 August	Inez de Beaufort	Peter van Ingen
7 (1994)	21 August	Rudy Kousbroek	Peter van Ingen
8 (1995)	2 July	Frits Bolkestein	Peter van Ingen
8 (1995)	9 July	Aryan Kaganof	Peter van Ingen
8 (1995)	16 July	Lydia Rood	Peter van Ingen
8 (1995)	23 July	Marcel Kurpershoek	Peter van Ingen
8 (1995)	30 July	Harry Mulisch	Peter van Ingen
9 (1996)	14 July	Connie Palmen	Freek de Jonge
9 (1996)	21 July	Jan Vrijman	Freek de Jonge
9 (1996)	28 July	Thom Hoffman	Freek de Jonge
9 (1996)	4 August	Anton Corbijn	Freek de Jonge
9 (1996)	11 August	Gerardjan Rijnders	Freek de Jonge
10 (1997)	3 August	Candy Dulfer	Wim T. Schippers
10 (1997)	10 August	K. Schippers	Wim T. Schippers
10 (1997)	17 August	Arnon Grunberg	Wim T. Schippers
10 (1997)	24 August	Jaap van Heerden	Wim T. Schippers
10 (1997)	31 August	Hugo Brandt Corstius	Wim T. Schippers
11 (1998)	2 August	Renate Dorrestein	Hanneke Groenteman
11 (1998)	9 August	Arend Jan Dunning	Hanneke Groenteman
11 (1998)	16 August	Willem van Kooten	Hanneke Groenteman
11 (1998)	23 August	Alex van Warmerdam	Hanneke Groenteman
12 (1999)	1 August	Sonja Barend	Adriaan van Dis
12 (1999)	8 August	Tom Lanoye	Adriaan van Dis
12 (1999)	15 August	Tamarah Benima	Adriaan van Dis
12 (1999)	22 August	Kader Abdolah	Adriaan van Dis
13 (2000)	22 July	Kristien Hemmerechts	Adriaan van Dis
13 (2000)	6 August	Geert Mak	Adriaan van Dis
13 (2000)	13 August	Helga Ruebsamen	Adriaan van Dis
13 (2000)	20 August	Henk van Os	Adriaan van Dis
13 (2000)	27 August	Raoul Heertje	Adriaan van Dis
14 (2001)	5 August	Mensje van Keulen	Adriaan van Dis
14 (2001)	12 August	Sylvia Tóth	Adriaan van Dis
14 (2001)	19 August	Frits Barend	Adriaan van Dis
14 (2001)	19 August	Henk van Dorp	Adriaan van Dis
14 (2001)	26 August	Youp van 't Hek	Adriaan van Dis
14 (2001)	2 September	Martin Bril	Adriaan van Dis
15 (2002)	11 August	Mies Bouwman	Adriaan van Dis
15 (2002)	18 August	Cees Fasseur	Adriaan van Dis
15 (2002)	25 August	Anna Enquist	Adriaan van Dis
15 (2002)	1 September	Huub van der Lubbe	Adriaan van Dis
16 (2003)	3 August	Britta Böhler	Joost Zwagerman
16 (2003)	10 August	Paul de Leeuw	Joost Zwagerman
16 (2003)	17 August	Hafid Bouazza	Joost Zwagerman
16 (2003)	24 August	Dries van Agt	Joost Zwagerman
16 (2003)	31 August	Henriëtte Maassen van den Brink	Joost Zwagerman
17 (2004)	25 July	Heleen van Rooyen	Joost Zwagerman
17 (2004)	1 August	Felix Rottenberg	Joost Zwagerman
17 (2004)	8 August	Theo Maassen	Joost Zwagerman
17 (2004)	15 August	Morris Tabaksblat	Joost Zwagerman
17 (2004)	22 August	Tijs Goldschmidt	Joost Zwagerman
17 (2004)	29 August	Ayaan Hirsi Ali	Joost Zwagerman
18 (2005)	24 July	Cees Nooteboom	Connie Palmen
18 (2005)	31 July	Tom Barman	Connie Palmen
18 (2005)	7 August	Robbert Dijkgraaf	Connie Palmen
18 (2005)	14 August	Maria Goos	Connie Palmen
18 (2005)	21 August	Wim Anker	Connie Palmen
18 (2005)	28 August	Katja Schuurman	Connie Palmen
19 (2006)	30 July	Jeltje van Nieuwenhoven	Joris Luyendijk
19 (2006)	6 August	Joep van Lieshout	Joris Luyendijk
19 (2006)	13 August	Leon de Winter	Joris Luyendijk
19 (2006)	20 August	Halina Reijn	Joris Luyendijk
19 (2006)	27 August	Ad Verburgge	Joris Luyendijk
19 (2006)	3 September	Henkjan Smits	Joris Luyendijk
20 (2007)	22 July	Bettine Vriesekoop	Joris Luyendijk
20 (2007)	29 July	Bram Moszkowicz	Joris Luyendijk
20 (2007)	5 August	Hany Abu-Assad	Joris Luyendijk
20 (2007)	12 August	Christine van Broeckhoven	Joris Luyendijk
20 (2007)	19 August	Alexander Rinnooy Kan	Joris Luyendijk
20 (2007)	26 August	Linda de Mol	Joris Luyendijk
21 (2008)	27 July	Ronald Plasterk	Bas Heijne
21 (2008)	3 August	Tom Holkenborg	Bas Heijne
21 (2008)	10 August	Naema Tahir	Bas Heijne
21 (2008)	17 August	Annemarie Prins	Bas Heijne
21 (2008)	24 August	Willem Schinkel	Bas Heijne
21 (2008)	31 August	Joop van den Ende	Bas Heijne
22 (2009)	26 July	Viktor Horsting & Rolf Snoeren	Margriet van der Linden
22 (2009)	2 August	Prem Radhakishun	Margriet van der Linden
22 (2009)	9 August	Trudy Dehue	Margriet van der Linden
22 (2009)	16 August	Carice van Houten	Margriet van der Linden
22 (2009)	23 August	Alexander Pechtold	Margriet van der Linden
22 (2009)	30 August	Jaap van Zweden	Margriet van der Linden
23 (2010)	25 July	Jan Marijnissen	Jelle Brandt Corstius
23 (2010)	1 August	Maarten 't Hart	Jelle Brandt Corstius
23 (2010)	8 August	Paulien Cornelisse	Jelle Brandt Corstius
23 (2010)	15 August	Annet Malherbe	Jelle Brandt Corstius
23 (2010)	22 August	Paul Verhoeven	Jelle Brandt Corstius
23 (2010)	29 August	Erwin Olaf	Jelle Brandt Corstius
24 (2011)	24 July	Marc-Marie Huijbregts	Jelle Brandt Corstius
24 (2011)	31 July	Dick Swaab	Jelle Brandt Corstius
24 (2011)	7 August	Step Vaessen	Jelle Brandt Corstius
24 (2011)	14 August	Lilian Gonçalves-Ho Kang You	Jelle Brandt Corstius
24 (2011)	21 August	Erik van Lieshout	Jelle Brandt Corstius
24 (2011)	28 August	Guy Verhofstadt	Jelle Brandt Corstius
25 (2012)	22 July	Henry Vrienten	Jan Leyers
25 (2012)	29 July	Micha Wertheim	Jan Leyers
25 (2012)	5 August − 1 September	Jolande Withuis	Jan Leyers
25 (2012)	12 August	Lidewij Edelkoort	Jan Leyers
25 (2012)	19 August	Ben Verwaayen	Jan Leyers
25 (2012)	26 August	Adriaan van Dis	Jan Leyers
26 (2013)	28 July	Hans Teeuwen	Wilfried de Jong
26 (2013)	4 August	Nelleke Noordervliet	Wilfried de Jong
26 (2013)	11 August	Beatrice de Graaf	Wilfried de Jong
26 (2013)	18 August	Johan Simons	Wilfried de Jong
26 (2013)	25 August	Wouter Bos	Wilfried de Jong
26 (2013)	1 September	Daan Roosegaarde	Wilfried de Jong
27 (2014)	20 July	Freek de Jonge	Wilfried de Jong
27 (2014)	27 July	Jim Taihuttu	Wilfried de Jong
27 (2014)	3 August	Saskia Noort	Wilfried de Jong
27 (2014)	10 August	Reinbert de Leeuw	Wilfried de Jong
27 (2014)	17 August	Ionica Smeets	Wilfried de Jong
27 (2014)	24 August	David Van Reybrouck	Wilfried de Jong
28 (2015)	26 July	Ahmed Aboutaleb	Wilfried de Jong
28 (2015)	2 August	Peter Buwalda	Wilfried de Jong
28 (2015)	9 August	Simon(e) van Saarloos	Wilfried de Jong
28 (2015)	16 August	Adriaan Geuze	Wilfried de Jong
28 (2015)	23 August	Annejet van der Zijl	Wilfried de Jong
28 (2015)	30 August	Damiaan Denys	Wilfried de Jong
29 (2016)	31 July	Dyab Abou Jahlah	Thomas Erdbrink
29 (2016)	7 August	Arjen Lubach	Thomas Erdbrink
29 (2016)	14 August	Hedy d'Ancona	Thomas Erdbrink
29 (2016)	21 August	Griet Op de Beeck	Thomas Erdbrink
29 (2016)	28 August	Andrea Maier	Thomas Erdbrink
29 (2016)	4 September	Mark Rutte	Thomas Erdbrink
30 (2017)	23 July	Rosanne Hertzberger	Janine Abbring
30 (2017)	30 July	Eberhard van der Laan	Janine Abbring
30 (2017)	6 August	Glenn Helberg	Janine Abbring
30 (2017)	13 August	Wim Opbrouck	Janine Abbring
30 (2017)	20 August	Frans de Waal	Janine Abbring
30 (2017)	27 August	Claudia de Breij	Janine Abbring
31 (2018)	29 July	Romana Vrede	Janine Abbring
31 (2018)	5 August	Louis van Gaal	Janine Abbring
31 (2018)	12 August	Marleen Stikker	Janine Abbring
31 (2018)	19 August	Pieter Waterdrinker	Janine Abbring
31 (2018)	26 August	Eric Wiebes	Janine Abbring
31 (2018)	2 September	Esther Perel	Janine Abbring
32 (2019)	28 July	John van den Heuvel	Janine Abbring
32 (2019)	4 August	Hanna Bervoets	Janine Abbring
32 (2019)	11 August	Nina Jurna	Janine Abbring
32 (2019)	18 August	Maxim Februari	Janine Abbring
32 (2019)	25 August	Wanda de Kanter	Janine Abbring
32 (2019)	1 September	Ivo van Hove	Janine Abbring
33 (2020)	19 July	Glenn de Randamie	Janine Abbring
33 (2020)	26 July	Inez Weski	Janine Abbring
33 (2020)	2 August	Nazmiye Oral	Janine Abbring
33 (2020)	9 August	Jaap Goudsmit	Janine Abbring
33 (2020)	16 August	Carola Schouten	Janine Abbring
33 (2020)	23 August	Ilja Leonard Pfeijffer	Janine Abbring
34 (2021)	18 July	Floris Alkemade	Janine Abbring
34 (2021)	25 July	Roxanne van Iperen	Janine Abbring
34 (2021)	1 August	Robert Vermeiren	Janine Abbring
34 (2021)	8 August	Sevda Alizadeh	Janine Abbring
34 (2021)	15 August	Alfred Birney	Janine Abbring
34 (2021)	22 August	Hans Klok	Janine Abbring
35 (2022)	24 July	Humberto Tan	Janine Abbring
35 (2022)	31 July	Sandra Phlippen	Janine Abbring
35 (2022)	7 August	Derk Sauer	Janine Abbring
35 (2022)	14 August	Lieke Marsman	Janine Abbring
35 (2022)	21 August	Raven van Dorst	Janine Abbring
35 (2022)	28 August	Bessel van der Kolk	Janine Abbring
36 (2023)	23 July	Thomas Hertog	Theo Maassen
36 (2023)	30 July	Hoyte van Hoytema	Theo Maassen
36 (2023)	6 August	Khadija Arib	Theo Maassen
36 (2023)	13 August	Bibi Dumon Tak	Theo Maassen
36 (2023)	20 August	Kamagurka	Theo Maassen
36 (2023)	27 August	Alida Dors	Theo Maassen
37 (2024)	21 July	Eric van der Burg	Peter van Ingen
37 (2024)	28 July	Sana Valiulina	Jelle Brandt Corstius
37 (2024)	4 August	Sakir Khader	Joris Luyendijk
37 (2024)	11 August	Garrie van Pinxteren	Janine Abbring
37 (2024)	18 August	Liesbeth Zegveld	Margriet van der Linden
37 (2024)	25 August	Pierre Bokma	Hanneke Groenteman
38 (2025)	27 July	Özcan Akyol	Griet Op de Beeck
38 (2025)	3 August	Simon Kuper	Griet Op de Beeck
38 (2025)	10 August	Eva Crutzen	Griet Op de Beeck
38 (2025)	17 August	Uğur Ümit Üngör	Griet Op de Beeck
38 (2025)	24 August	Femke Halsema	Griet Op de Beeck
38 (2025)	31 August	Herman Koch	Griet Op de Beeck
39 (2026)	26 July	Peter Pannekoek	Janine Abbring
39 (2026)	2 August	Nasrah Habiballah	Janine Abbring
39 (2026)	9 August	Merel Pauw	Janine Abbring
39 (2026)	16 August	Tommy Wieringa	Janine Abbring
39 (2026)	23 August	Sigrid Kaag	Janine Abbring
39 (2026)	30 August	Jim van Os	Janine Abbring
