= Sander Schimmelpenninck =

Dutch journalist

Sander Schimmelpenninck Count Schimmelpenninck
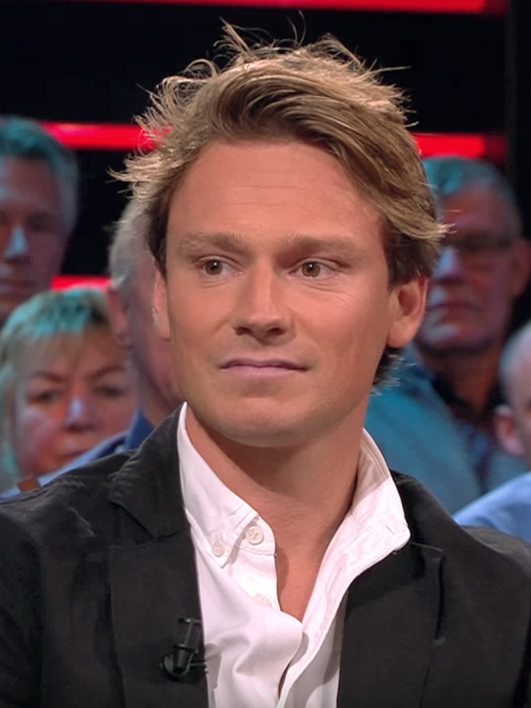
- Schimmelpenninck in 2017
- Born: Sander Cornelis graaf Schimmelpenninck; June 26, 1984 (age 42); Hengelo, The Netherlands
- Education: Leiden University (BA); Erasmus University (LL.B); Bocconi University (LL.M)
- Occupations: Television presenter; columnist; writer
- Years active: 2013–present
- Employers: Quote (2013–2020); WNL (2018–2020); de Volkskrant (2019–present); VPRO (2020–present)
- Partner: Lotta Klemming
- Family: Schimmelpenninck
- Website: Official website

Count Sander Cornelis Schimmelpenninck (born June 26, 1984) is a Dutch nobleman, opinion writer, commentator, and television presenter. From 2016 to September 2020, he was the editor-in-chief of the magazine Quote. Since September 2019, he has been a columnist for the newspaper de Volkskrant. Along with his college friend Jaap Reesema and Titus van Dijk, he co-founded the production company Tonny Media, which produces podcasts including the Zelfspodcast.

== Early life and education ==
Schimmelpenninck was born into the noble branch of the Schimmelpenninck family with being the son of the former steward of Twickel Castle, Count Albert Hieronymus Schimmelpenninck, and radiologist Marie Liesbeth Henriëtte Helène Scheiffers. He grew up in Diepenheim and attended first his secondary education at the Bataafs Lyceum in Hengelo, but then went to the Staring College in Lochem in 1996, where he completed his gymnasium education in 2003. Subsequently, he studied at the same time at Leiden University and Erasmus University Rotterdam, where he respectively obtained a BA in Italian language and culture in 2006 and an LL.B degree in Business Law in 2008. He then went to the Bocconi University in Milan where he received an LL.M in Business Law in 2009.

== Career ==
After finishing his studies Schimmelpenninck worked for three years as a trainee lawyer at the Houthoff Buruma law firm on the Zuidas in Amsterdam. He then started a pizza restaurant called Pink Flamingo in Amsterdam with his college friend Jaap Reesema.

In 2013 Schimmelpenninck started working as an editor at the business magazine Quote. In 2016 he succeeded Mirjam van den Broeke as editor-in-chief. After more than three years, he announced his departure to focus on new projects.

Since 2019 he has been a columnist for the newspaper de Volkskrant.

In 2019 Schimmelpenninck started a podcast called the Zelfspodcast together with Reesema, in which they discuss their daily lives based on different topics per episode. On October 6, 2020, they won the award for best podcast at the Online Radio Awards.

At the end of 2020, along with Reesema and Titus van Dijk he founded the media company Tonny Media that primarily produces podcasts, including Geuze & Gorgels and Marc–Marie & Aaf vinden iets since January 2021.

=== Television ===
==== WNL (2018–2020) ====
The first television program that Schimmelpenninck made was De Opvolgers for WNL in 2018. In that year, he was the winner of the TV quiz De Slimste Mens. From January 9, 2020, until the end of August of that year, he presented the NPO talk show Op1 on Thursday evenings with Welmoed Sijtsma. He was succeeded by Jort Kelder. Before and after that, he was a regular guest on talk shows such as Beau, De Wereld Draait Door, and Jinek.

In addition to his work on Op1, Schimmelpenninck made a season of Dragons' Den on NPO 1 from April 2020, in which aspiring entrepreneurs pitch their own businesses to a group of investors. Jort Kelder was also his successor here.

==== VPRO (2020–present) ====
Together with Thomas Erdbrink, Northern Europe correspondent for The New York Times, Schimmelpenninck made a one-time special in 2020 about the Swedish approach to the Coronavirus pandemic: Zweden doen het anders (Sweden does it differently). In 2021, Schimmelpenninck developed the program Sander en de Kloof (Sander and the Divide), which aired on television in 2022. The program was nominated for a Televizierring award in the 'Impact' category.

== Filmography ==
Year	Title	Channel	Role
2018	De Opvolgers	NPO 2 (WNL)	Host
2020	Op1	NPO 1 (WNL)	Host
2020	Dragons' Den	NPO 1 (WNL)	Host
2020	Zweden Doen Het Anders	NPO 2 (VPRO)	Host
2021	Sander en de kloof	NPO 3 (VPRO)	Host
2022	College Tour	NPO 2 (KRO-NCRV)	Guest

== Bibliography ==
- 2019: Elite gezocht; Prometheus – with Ruben van Zwieten.
- 2023: Sander en de brug: Vijf voorstellen voor een eerlijker Nederland; De Correspondent.
