= Bissy =

Bissy may refer to:

- "de Bissy" family
- Cola acuminata
