= 4FFF N618 =

Electronic book reader

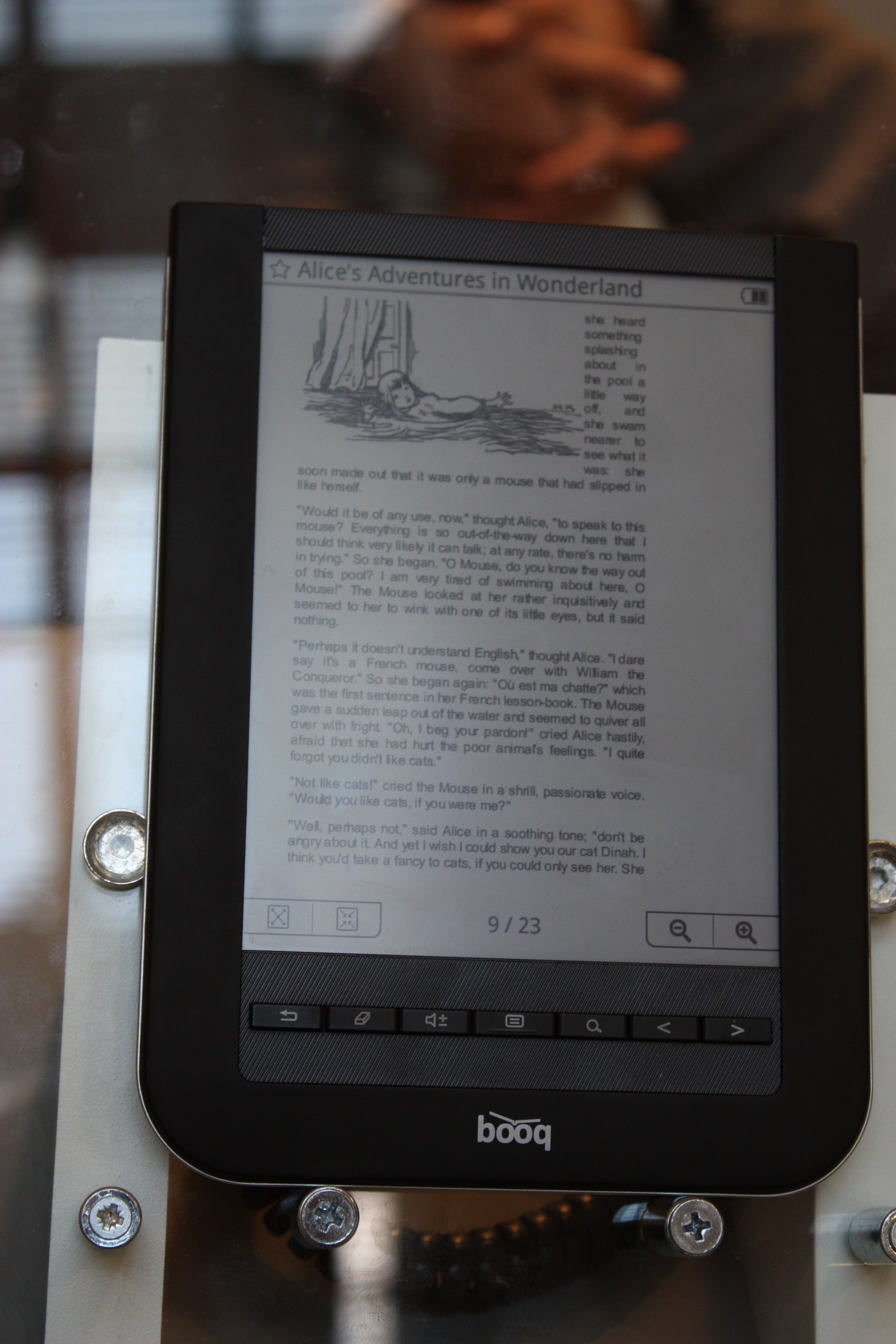
- 4FFF N618 branded as Booq Avant
- Manufacturer: 4FFF
- Type: e-book reader
- Release date: 2010
- Introductory price: € 229 (EU)
- Operating system: Linux 2.6.23
- CPU: Samsung 2416 ARM9 @ 400MHz
- Memory: 128 MB (MDDR), 2GB (NAND); External: microSD/microSDHC
- Display: 6 inch SiPix
- Graphics: 800 × 600, 167 ppi density, 16 levels of grayscale
- Sound: built-in speakers
- Input: 7 keys
- Touchpad: Capacitive
- Connectivity: Wi-Fi b/g, microUSB high speed, audio jack
- Power: 1530 mAh, 3.7 V
- Dimensions: 168 × 123 × 9 mm
- Weight: 240 gram
- Related: Qisda ES900

4FFF N618 is a discontinued electronic-book reader developed by an Indian Company, Condor Technology Associates, and based on a Linux platform. The device is sold under various brand names worldwide.

== Features ==
4FFF N618 provides a 16 levels of grayscale SiPix touchscreen display for viewing digital content. Pages are turned using the buttons on the device. The N618 connects to the internet through an available Wi-Fi connections. Users can read books without a wireless connection: disconnecting the wireless connection can prolong the battery's charge for up to 29 days.

== Specifications ==
The Display is an electronic paper touchscreen from SiPix with 800×600 pixels (4:3) on 6 inch (167 ppi density) and 16 levels of grayscale.

CPU

- Samsung 2416 ARM9 @ 400 MHz

OS

- Linux 2.6.23

Memory

- 128 MB (MDDR)
- 2 GB (NAND)
- External microSD/microSDHC (up to 16 GB)

Connectivity

- Wi-Fi b/g
- microUSB high speed
- audio jack

Miscellaneous

- 1530 mAh, 3.7 V
- 240 gram
- Reading mode
  - 10.000 pages (Wi-Fi off)
  - 3.000 pages (Wi-Fi on)
- Stand by mode: 700 hours

== Formats supported ==
Text

- ePUB
- HTML
- PDF
- RTF
- TXT

Picture

- BMP
- JPEG
- PNG

Audio

- MP3

== Sold as ==
The device is sold worldwide under various brand names.

Asia

- India: eGriver Touch

Europe

- France: OYO (as released in October 2010 by Medion, chapitre.com/Direct Group Bertelsmann), FnacBook (from the french retailer Fnac)
- Germany, Austria, Switzerland: OYO (Medion, Thalia)
- Switzerland: ImCoSys ereader
- Italy: DeVo eVreader
- Netherlands: ProMedia eBook Reader; Icarus Sense E650SR; OYO (Medion, Selexyz)
- Poland: OYO (Medion, Empik)
- Spain: Nvsbl L337 / Booq Avant / Papyre 6.2
- Russia: Mr. Book, One-XT, Айчиталка
- Bulgaria: Prestigio PER5062B
- Turkey: Reeder Reeder2

Across Europe available as:

- Icarus Sense

Middle East

- Israel: E-vrit

North America

- Canada: Pandigital Novel 6" Personal eReader
- United States: Qisda QD060B00 / Pandigital Novel 6" Personal eReader

South America

- Brazil: Positivo Alfa (not supports any audio file)

== Modification ==
Being that the hardware utilizes Linux-based software it can be changed or improved to their heart's content. The firmware is labeled as “QT Software” and varies from vendor to vendor. The upgrade contains multiple image files with the extension of img, along with other system files.

Flashing to upgrade the firmware can be taken advantage of as it does not seem to check if the version that is being installed is older. Due to this, using firmware made by the other vendors on the model each sold in particular is possible.

== Dual-boot ==
The devices seem to contain a native dual-boot capability. When a device specific key combination is pressed during power-on any linux-kernel + ramdisk combination is booted from the sd-card.
