= Newsha Tavakolian =

Iranian photojournalist and documentary photographer

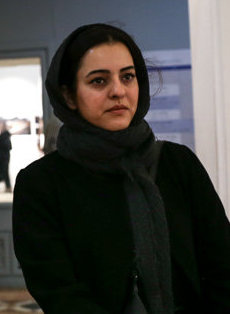
- Tavakolian in 2017
- Born: 1981 (age 44–45); Tehran, Iran
- Occupations: Journalist; Photographer
- Employer(s): Time; The New York Times; Stern; Le Figaro; Magnum Photos
- Spouse: Thomas Erdbrink (m. 2003)

Newsha Tavakolian (Persian: نیوشا توکلیان; born 1981) is an Iranian photojournalist and documentary photographer. She has worked for Time magazine, The New York Times, Le Figaro, and National Geographic. Her work focuses on women's issues and she has been a member of the Rawiya women's photography collective which she co-established in 2011. Tavakolian is a full member of Magnum Photos.

== Career ==
Born and brought up in Tehran, at age 16, Tavakolian took a six-month photography course, after which she began working as a professional photographer in the Iranian press. She started at the women's daily newspaper Zan, and later worked for other nine reformist dailies, all of which have since been banned. She covered the July 1999 student uprising, using her Minolta with a 50mm lens, and her photographs were published in several publications. However she was forced to go on hiatus from her photojournalist work following the "chaos" of Iran’s presidential election in 2009. During this time, she began other projects focusing on art using photography as well as social documentary. Tavakolian’s photographs became more artistic and involved social commentary.

She got her international break in 2001 at age 21, when she met J.P. Pappis, founder of Polaris Images, New York at a photography festival in Perpignan, France. She began covering Iran for Polaris Images, in the same year, and started working as a freelancer for The Times in 2004.

Tavakolian has worked internationally, covering wars, natural disasters and social documentary stories in Iraq, Lebanon, Syria, Saudi Arabia, Pakistan and Yemen. Her work has been published by international magazines and newspapers such as Time magazine, Newsweek, Stern, Le Figaro, Colors, New York Times Magazine, Der Spiegel, Le Monde, NRC Handelsblad and National Geographic.

Common themes in her work are photo stories of women, friends and neighbours in Iran; the evolving role of women in overcoming gender-based restrictions; and contrasting the stereotypes of western media. Her photo projects include Mother of Martyrs (2006), Women in the Axis of Evil (2006), The Day I Became a Woman (2010) and Look (2013).

In 2014, Tavakolian won a 50,000 euro photojournalism prize from French investment banker Edouard Carmignac and his foundation, the Fondation Carmignac. Tavakolian was to create her vision of Iran with a project she called "Blank Pages of an Iranian Photo Album." This project followed the lives of a diverse group of Iranian people who had been teenagers during the revolution. To Tavakolian's dismay, Carmignac wanted to tamper with her work. He insisted that she give the project a cliché title, "The Lost Generation," as well as removing the accompanying text that discussed her experience living in Iran. Tavakolian said, "I am not a delicate flower. I just want to take responsibility for my own work. Defend myself? I can. But if someone else paints me into a corner, how can I defend myself? I have covered a lot of events here, but always with me being responsible for my decisions." Tavakolian has since returned the reward. Her decision stems from her sentiments towards the West, as she actively denies Western influence on her art. This is central to her career as an Iranian artist. She stated, "When we’re stuck on getting the West to understand Iran, our work remains on the surface. I want to tell Iranians' story to Iranians themselves, this is where I can challenge myself and go deeper into the more complicated layers." Her work aims to be devoid of Western influence, as it is not intended for Western audiences. Tavakolian's work continues to be a real, personal representation of Iran. This is the focus of her work.

Tavakolian has had several controversial projects in the Islamic world. Her project "Listen" focuses on women singers who are not allowed to perform solo or produce their own CDs due to Islamic regulations in effect since the 1979 revolution. In addition to creating potential CD covers for female Muslim singers, Tavakolian includes portraits of the female singers, with eyes closed, mouths open, and passion on their faces. These women were so terrified of being photographed, Tavakolian spent almost a year convincing them to participate in the photo shoot. The women in the photographs are all professional singers who have stifled careers. According to the Islamic tenet, women are not allowed to sing to men. To make a living, these women can only sing at all-female parties, sing background vocals, or perform outside Iran. Thus, her work can be considered highly controversial to Muslim societies, in addition to countries that champion Islam.

In June 2016, the Media Development Authority (MDA) of Singapore censored 33 of Tavakolian's photographs planned for her I Know Why the Rebel Sings exhibition, as part of the Singapore International Festival of Arts pre-festival The O.P.E.N. programme, at the last minute. 15 of these photographs, picturing female rebels fighting against ISIS, were presented at the show, limited to those above 16 years old, blacked out. Festival director Ong Keng Sen issued a statement condemning MDA's move and lack of explanation and pointing out that the photographs were already published in the readily accessible Time magazine, both online and off. "And so we are living with a new terror where we don't know, it is out of our control," he said at the exhibition's launch.

In June 2015 Tavakolian became a nominee member of Magnum Photos and in 2019 a full member.

In 2019, the Iranian authorities barred her from working in the country.

== Personal life ==
She lives and works in Tehran and is married to the Dutch journalist Thomas Erdbrink.

== Awards ==
Tavakolian was part of the 2006 Joop Swart Masterclass organized by World Press Photo. In 2007 she was a finalist for the Inge Morath Award.

== Exhibitions ==
Her work has been exhibited at institutions such as the British Museum, the Victoria and Albert Museum, the Los Angeles County Museum of Art, the Museum of Fine Arts, Boston and Somerset House, London (April 2014) where she was one of eight Iranian photographers included in the Burnt Generation exhibition. In 2022, Tavakolian's work was included in the exhibition curated by Charlotte Cotton, "Close Enough: New Perspectives from 12 Women Photographers of Magnum," on view at the International Center of Photography from September 27, 2022-January 9, 2023. The exhibition's title was inspired by Magnum co-founder Robert Capa’s quote “If your pictures aren’t good enough, you’re not close enough,” and features projects from 12 living women Magnum Photos members.
