= Pim Fortuyn Prize =

Dutch annual political award

The Pim Fortuyn Prize (Dutch: Pim Fortuynprijs) has been an annual political award in the Netherlands which has been held since 2015. It is named after the late politician Pim Fortuyn.

According to the organizers, the award is intended for nominees who are "opinion makers, administrators or politicians who fight for free speech, dare to break through taboos and take a position in the social debate." One of its jury members is politician Joost Eerdmans.

Philosopher of law and columnist Afshin Ellian won the first edition on 15 May 2015.

== Recipients ==
- 2015: Afshin Ellian
- 2016: Leon de Winter
- 2017: Ebru Umar
- 2018: Theodor Holman
- 2019: John van den Heuvel and Paul Vugts
- 2020: Jort Kelder
- 2021: Fidan Ekiz
- 2022: Lale Gül
- 2023: Bart De Wever
- 2024: Natascha van Weezel
- 2025: Ronald Plasterk
- 2026: Keyvan Shahbazi
