= John van den Heuvel =

Dutch crime journalist (born 1962)

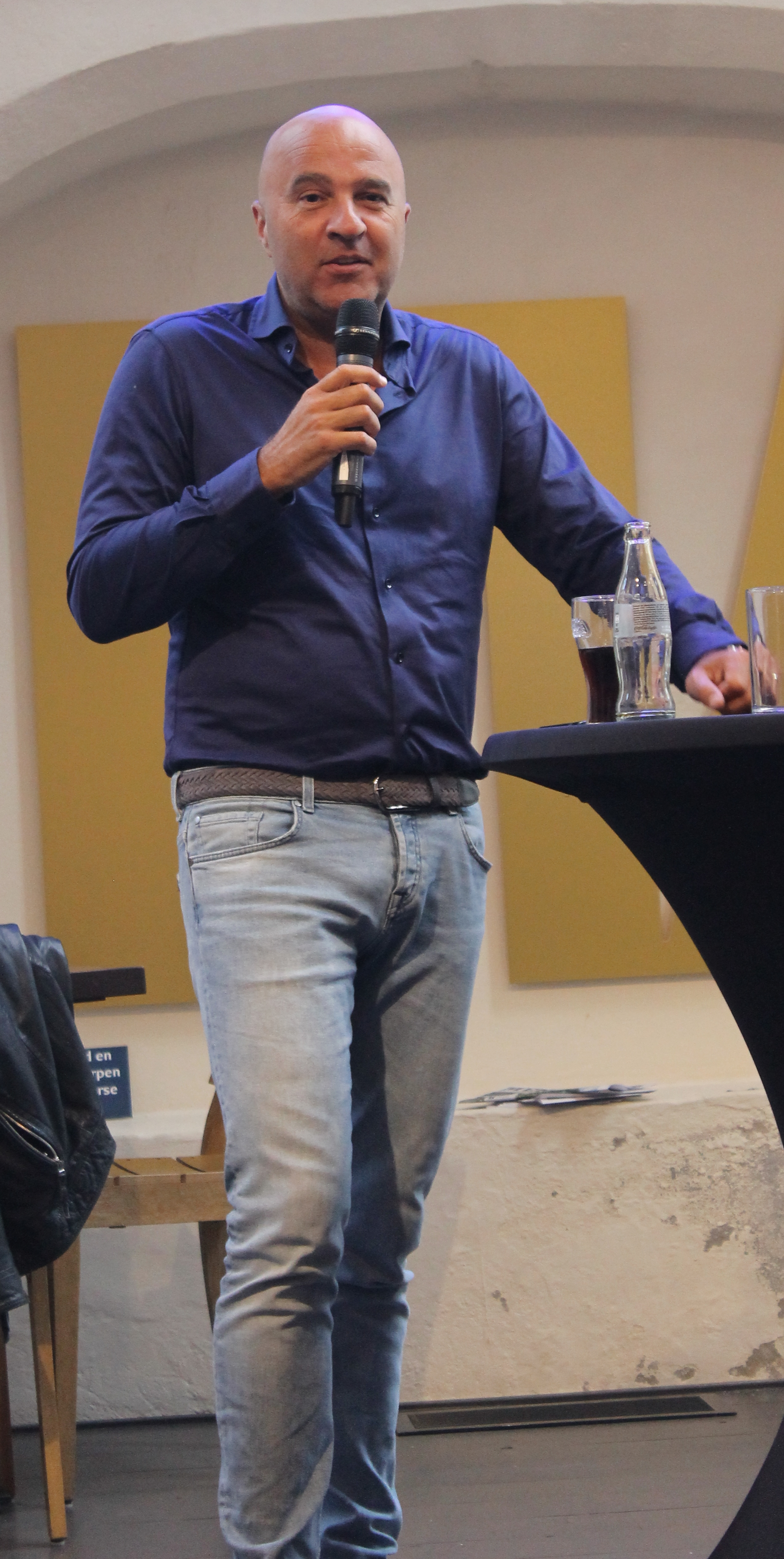
- John van den Heuvel (2016)
- Born: 26 December 1962 (age 63); Amsterdam, Netherlands
- Known for: RTL Boulevard; De Telegraaf

John van den Heuvel (born 26 December 1962) is a Dutch crime journalist, television presenter and former police officer.

== Career ==
Since 1990, he has worked as a crime reporter at the newspaper De Telegraaf.

Van den Heuvel often appears in the television programme RTL Boulevard to discuss crime-related news. He is also known for presenting various crime-related television programs including Bureau Misdaad, Bureau van den Heuvel and Das je goed recht.

As of December 2017, due to concerns for his safety, he receives full-time protection by the Dienst Koninklijke en Diplomatieke Beveiliging, which also protects the Dutch royal family and other threatened individuals. This prevented him from appearing in live broadcasts of RTL Boulevard in 2018. In July 2021, Van den Heuvel also stopped appearing in broadcasts of the show after investigative journalist and crime reporter Peter R. de Vries was shot after leaving the show's studio in Amsterdam, Netherlands. In January 2022, the A2 motorway was partially closed temporarily as a result of a threat to his safety.

In 2019, he appeared in an episode of Zomergasten. In the episode he discussed the impact of living with full-time protection and the possibility of reducing it. For his television show Dossier Van den Heuvel, he traveled to people around the world who have become a victim of crime. Van den Heuvel was one of the crime reporters in the 2021 television show Crime Desk presented by Marieke Elsinga.

In 2023, he won the Italian journalism award Premio Ischia Internazionale.

In 2025, he presented the Videoland documentary Drugs van de Duivel about the drug crystal meth. In 2026, he made the documentary De Instagram Moord about a 2021 murder which took place in 's-Hertogenbosch, Netherlands: 21-year-old Bouchra killed her half-sister Anouk using a knife and she livestreamed it via Instagram.

=== Television appearances ===
Van den Heuvel appeared as a contestant in various game shows including De Jongens tegen de Meisjes (in 2011), Weet Ik Veel (in 2013) and Ik hou van Holland (in 2009 and 2012). In 2011, he also appeared in the television show House Ibiza, a television show by PowNed inspired by the format of Villa Felderhof. In 2019, he made his acting debut in the series Random Shit. In that same year, he appeared as a police officer in the Sinterklaasjournaal. In 2020, Van den Heuvel was the main guest in an episode of Hoge Bomen presented by Jeroen van der Boom. He also appeared in the Dutch version of The Masked Singer. In 2025, he appeared in an episode of the show De reünie presented by Herman van der Zandt.

== Personal life ==
Van den Heuvel was born in Amsterdam, to a Dutch mother and a Moroccan father, and he grew up in Eindhoven.

The assassination of Peter R. de Vries in July 2021 resulted in additional security measures for Van den Heuvel and his family. His wife lost her job as the school where she worked was not willing to accept the increased security measures.

He is a fan of the work of American novelist John Grisham.

== Awards ==
- 2019: Pim Fortuyn Prize
- 2023: Premio Ischia Internazionale

== Filmography ==
=== As presenter ===
- Bureau Misdaad
- Bureau van den Heuvel
- Das je goed recht
- Dossier Van den Heuvel (2019)
- De Jacht op de Mocro Maffia
- Ontvoerd
- Drugs van de Duivel (2025, Videoland)

=== As crime reporter ===
- Crime Desk (2021)

=== As contestant / guest ===
- Ik hou van Holland (2009, 2012)
- De Jongens tegen de Meisjes (2011)
- Weet Ik Veel (2013)
- Het Jachtseizoen (2017)
- Hoge Bomen (2020)
- The Masked Singer (2020)
- Sterren op het Doek (2022)
- Isola di Beau (2022)
- De reünie (2025)

=== As actor ===
- Random Shit (2019)
- Het Sinterklaasjournaal (2019)

=== As voice actor ===
- The Angry Birds Movie 2 (2019, Jerry)
