= Henri de Thiard de Bissy =

French general and writer

- Born: January 7, 1723
- Died: July 26, 1794
- Allegiance: Kingdom of France; Bissy Family
- Branch: Royal French Army
- Service years: 1738–?
- Rank: Brevet Lieutenant General
- Awards: Order of the Holy Spirit

Henri Charles Gabriel de Thiard de Bissy, comte de Thiard (7 January 1723 – 26 July 1794) was a French general and writer. He was the younger brother of Claude de Thiard de Bissy, also a general and a writer. Henri was guillotined on the day Robespierre fell during the French Revolution.

== Biography ==
Coming from the Thiard family, Henri was the son of Claude, 7th count of Bissy (d. July 2, 1723), and Sylvie Angélique Andrault de Langeron and a descendant of the poet Pontus de Tyard. He is the younger brother of the academician Claude de Thiard de Bissy, also a general and man of letters.

First known as the Chevalier de Bissy, Henri began a military career at the age of fifteen, becoming second lieutenant in an infantry regiment. On November 20, 1752, he married Anne Elisabeth Brissart, daughter of tax farmer Jacques Brissart and then took the title of Count of Thiard. Their daughter Marie married Charles de Fitz-James, 4th Duke of Fitz-James on December 26, 1768.

Count Thiard is known for his firmness in Brittany in the period preceding the French Revolution. In 1787, he obtained the command in chief of Brittany after having been Lieutenant-General Governor of Provence. During the election of the deputies to the Estates General, in May 1789, he had to face street fighting in Rennes, and only stopped the bloodshed at the risk of his life. The king's steward, Antoine-François Bertrand de Molleville, and himself were stoned by the crowd and forced to take refuge in the governor's palace. Henri was awarded the blue ribbon of the Order of the Holy Spirit.

Having remained loyal to the king, he was wounded during the storming of the Tuileries by the rioters on August 10, 1792. The Revolutionary Tribunal sent him to the scaffold on July 26, 1794. He successfully cultivated letters and poetry and left works published posthumously in 1799.
