= Lauren Verster =

Dutch television presenter

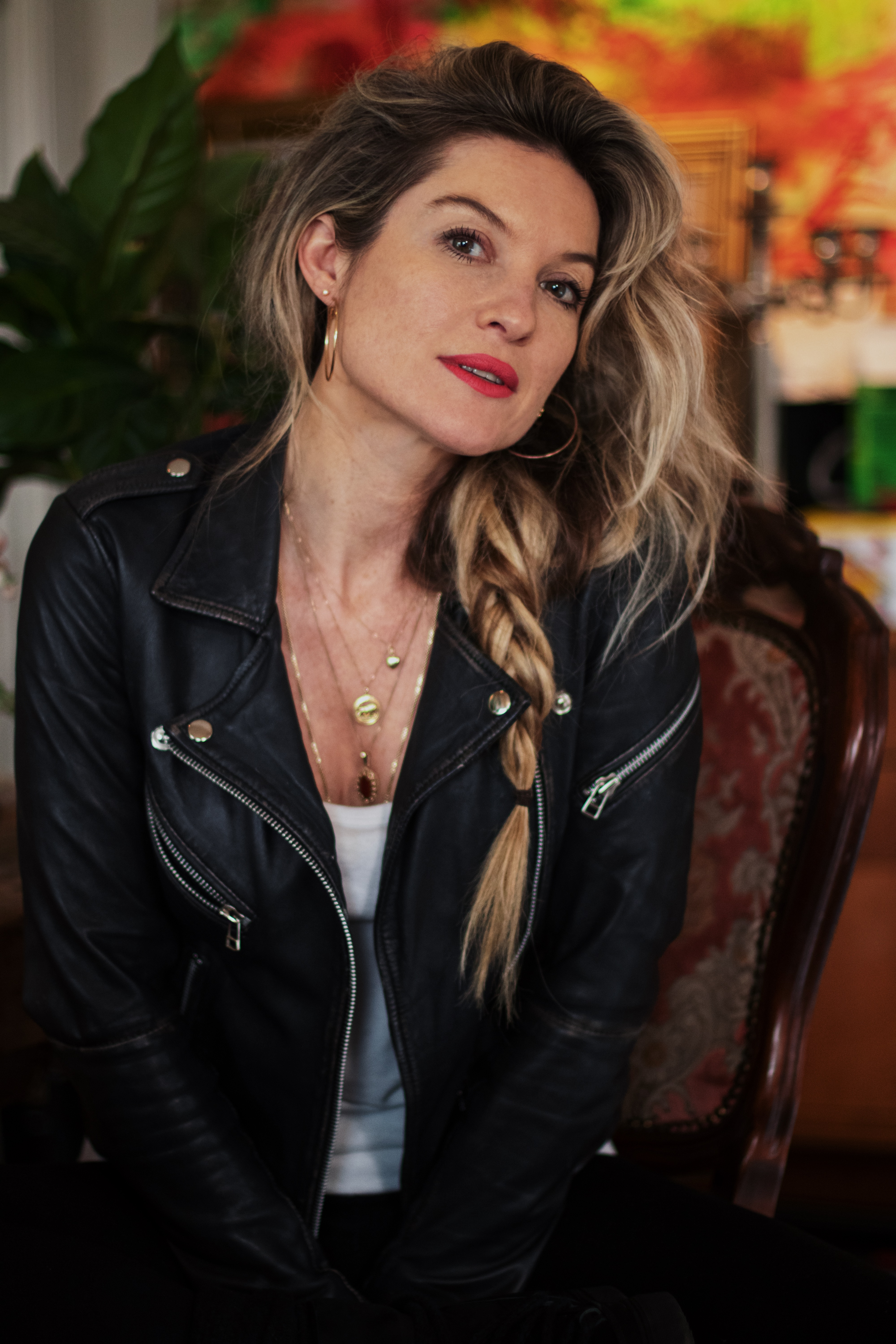
- Born: 27 April 1980 (age 45) 's-Hertogenbosch, Netherlands
- Education: University of Amsterdam (News and Information)
- Occupations: Programme maker; television presenter
- Television: Fort Boyard; Expeditie Poolcirkel; Atlas

Lauren Verster (born 27 April 1980) is a Dutch programme maker and television presenter.

== Early life ==
Verster was born in 's-Hertogenbosch. During high school, she worked at the local radio station Boschtion. In addition to her work as a (news) presenter, she also worked on youth programmes. After enrolling in an atheneum she moved to Amsterdam. While studying News and Information at the University of Amsterdam, she was taught regional broadcasting in North/West television and local broadcasting in Amsterdam, including filming, editing and presenting.

== Career ==
Her work was noticed by Nickelodeon and MTV Networks. She presented programmes such as the Netherlands Kids' Choice Awards in Nickelodeon Alex in the Box and 411 in The Box Comedy. She later worked as a filmmaker and appeared as a presenter of "De Jakhalzen" (The Jackals) in the VARA programme De Wereld Draait Door and 6pack on MTV Netherlands.

Verster presented Eye Opener on Veronica TV in 2008. In 2009; she appeared in Lauren Verslaat (Lauren Downs) at the same broadcaster; in which Verster became a professional photographer for different situations. Verster later presented Undercover Boss in 2010.

On 30 May 2012, it was announced that Verster had moved to Algemene Vereniging Radio Omroep (AVRO). She presented the revived Dutch version of Fort Boyard with Gerard Ekdom (Season 2) and Freek Bartels (Season 3). She also presented Expeditie Poolcirkel (Expedition Arctic Circle) and Atlas.

She published a book in November 2013, in which she interviewed on the theme of heartbreak.

Verster co-presented in De Duitsers (The Germans), a six-part series for TROS, every Wednesday, from 8 January 2014 for NPO 3. Along with Art Rooijakkers, she presented six episodes of the AVROTROS programme Bureau Rooijakkers en Verster (Office Rooijakkers and Verster) in early 2014, where social issues are vetted legally and scientifically.

== Personal life ==
Verster had a relationship with journalist and television producer Jort Kelder from early 2011 until the summer of 2015.

== Bibliography ==
Year	Title
2013	Uit: zuurzoete verhalen over liefdesverdriet (From: Sweet and Sour Stories of Heart Break)
