= Monique de Bissy =

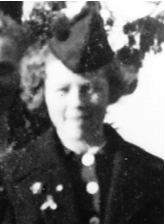
Monique de Bissy after her liberation by U.S. troops in August 1944.

Monique de Bissy (married Schimmelpenninck; 13 March 1923 – 17 November 2009) was a French-Belgian resistance member during World War II.

She was born in Schaerbeek, Belgium and died in Montpellier, France.

== Belgian Resistance ==
Monique de Bissy started the war as a nurse for the Belgian Red Cross and then she enrolled in the Resistance after the Belgian defeat in 1940 (aged 17). She worked for several resistance groups, such as the « Brigade Blanche », and the « Ailes Brisées ». She also worked on the Comet Line. She organized and participated in the escape to Spain of 20 Allies pilots after their aircraft had been shot by the German Army around the Belgian city of Liège. She was arrested in 1944 after denunciation and was taken to the jail of Maastricht in Netherlands where she was tortured.

After four months of detention she was liberated by U.S. troops in August 1944. She never gave any information to the Nazis during her captivity and she managed to keep her resistance partners safe by her silence.

Monique de Bissy enlisted as a nurse in the French army in September 1944.

== Post-war Activities ==
After the war she continued to work as a nurse, first in Belgian Congo, then in Montpellier (south of France) after the independence of the Belgian colony.

She died on 17 November 2009, six months after receiving the Légion d'Honneur from French Senator Jacqueline Gourault in the name of President Nicolas Sarkozy for her contribution to Peace and Freedom during World War II.

== Medals ==
Numerous countries have expressed their gratitude through number of medals:

- Belgium: "Médaille de la Résistance" (Resistance Medal) and "Médaille commémorative de la guerre 1940-1945" (Commemorative Medal of World War II) with Belgian Lion,
- United Kingdom: King's Medal for Courage in the Cause of Freedom,
- USA: Medal of Freedom,
- France: Légion d'Honneur.

== Gallery ==
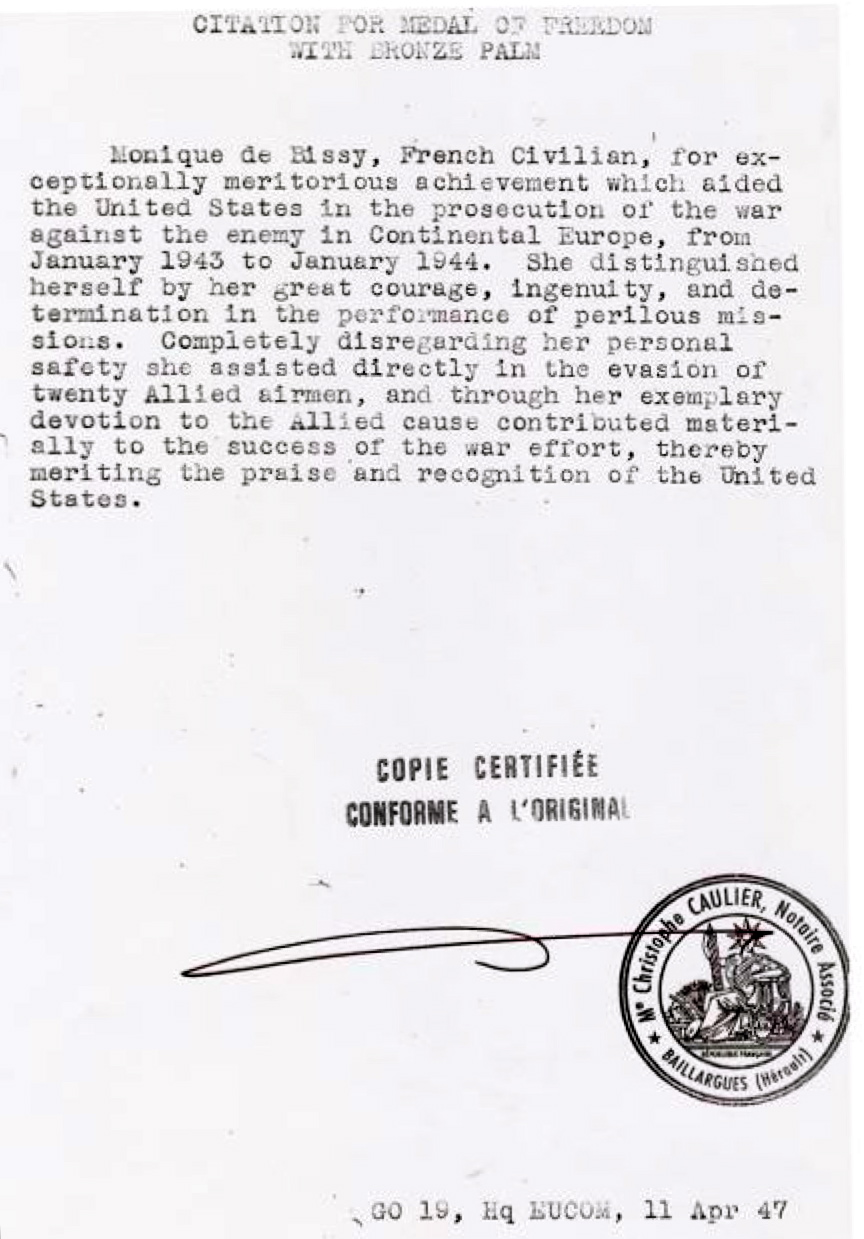
Citation for Medal of Freedom (1947).

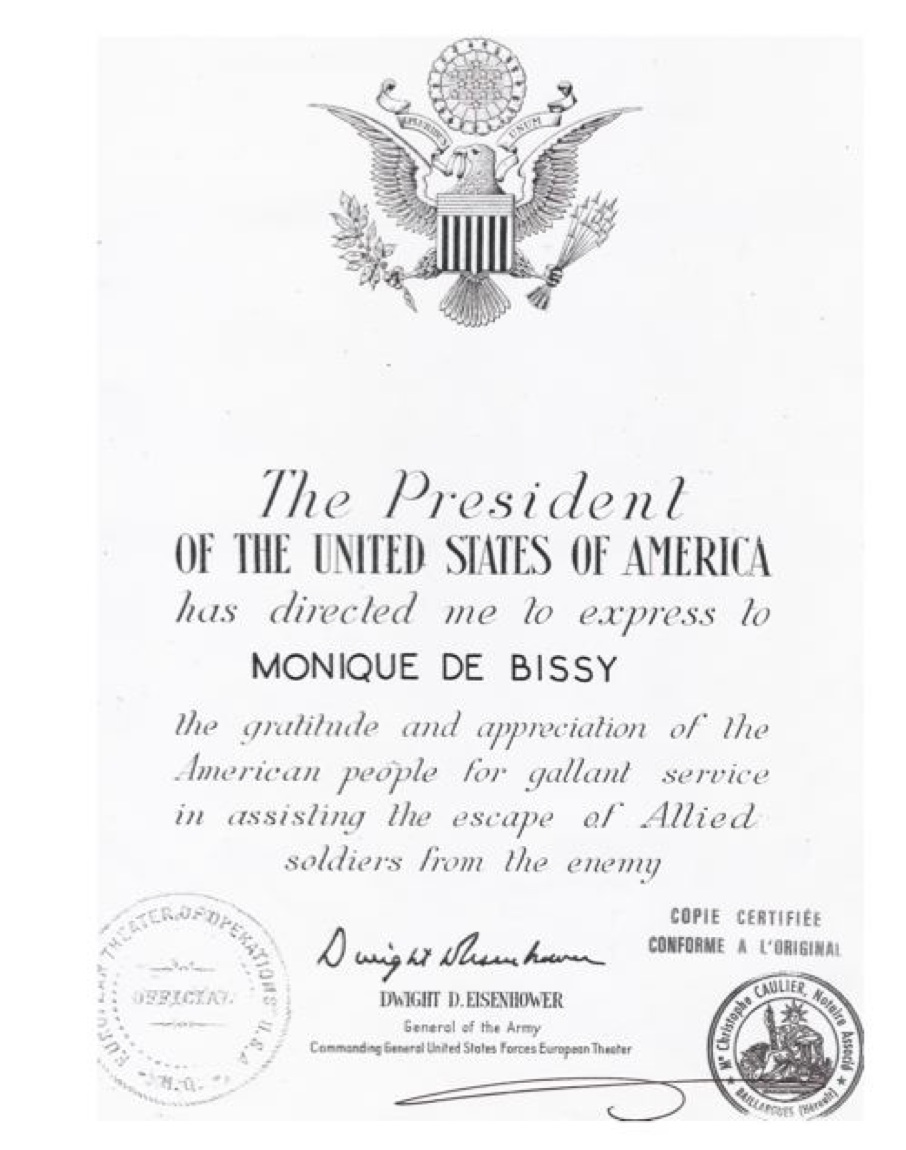
U.S. presidential gratitude expressed by General Dwight D. Eisenhower (1949).

== See also ==
- Bissy (family)
- Schimmelpenninck (family)
- Belgian Resistance during World War II
- French resistance during World War II
- Red Cross
