= Joris Luyendijk =

Dutch journalist

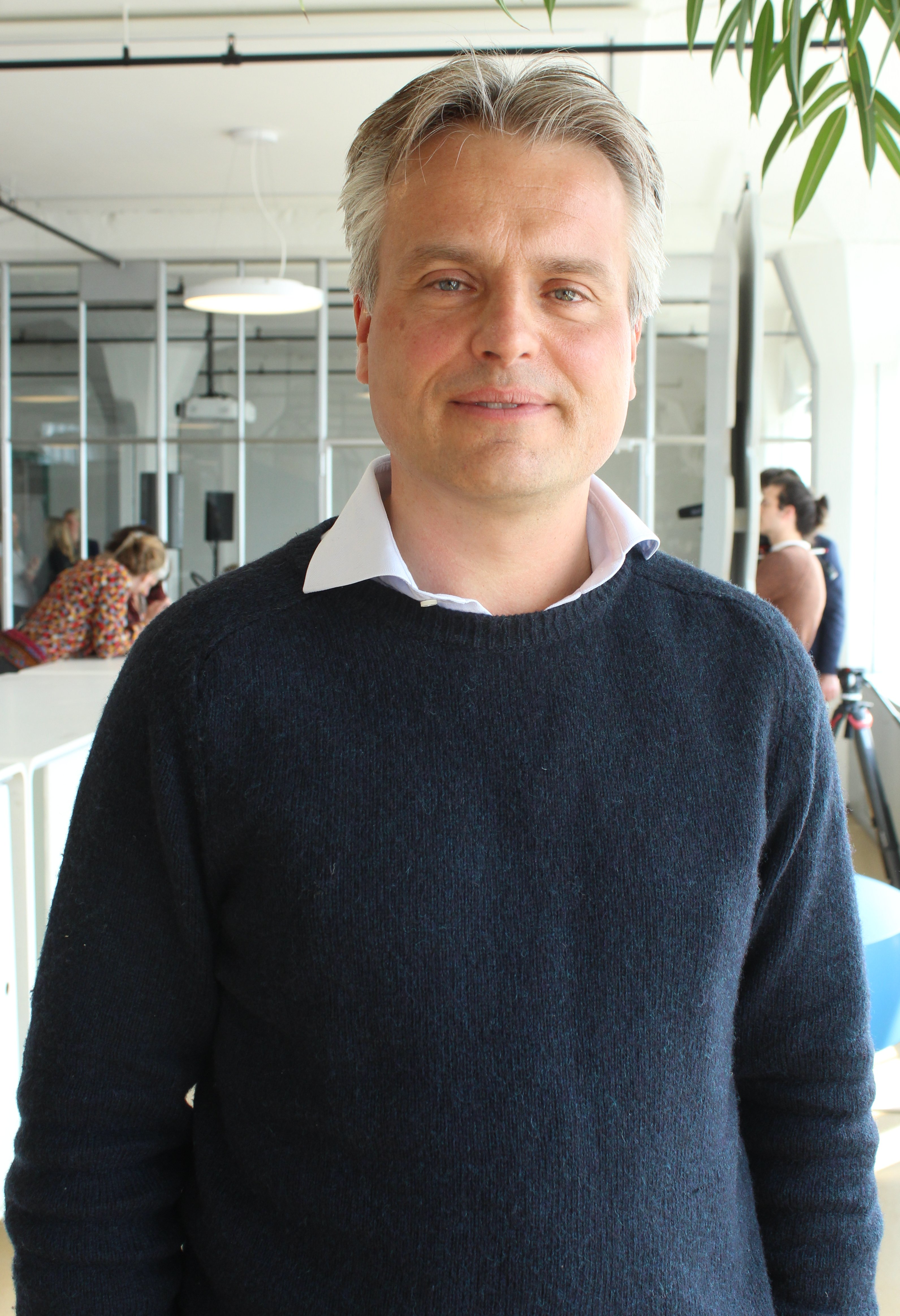
- Joris Luyendijk in 2019
- Born: 30 December 1971 (age 54); Amsterdam, Netherlands
- Education: University of Amsterdam
- Occupations: Author, journalist, talk show host
- Years active: 1998–present
- Joris Luyendijk introducing himself recorded March 2015
- Website: www.jorisluyendijk.nl

Joris Luyendijk (Dutch pronunciation: [ˈjoːrɪs ˈlœyə(n)ˌdɛik]; born 30 December 1971) is a Dutch non-fiction author, anthropologist, news correspondent, and TV interviewer.

== Biography ==
Joris Luyendijk was born on 30 December 1971 in Amsterdam in the Netherlands. He lived in Hilversum from the age of five. Luyendijk studied in Kansas, Amsterdam, and Cairo. He earned his Master's degree equivalent "doctoraal" degree in Cairo. His first book Een goede man slaat soms zijn vrouw (1998, A Good Man Sometimes Beats His Wife) is about the Egyptian society from a Western observer's point of view.

He eventually became a news correspondent for various Netherlands-based media organisations in the Middle East for a number of years. He was based in Egypt, Lebanon, and the Palestinian territories. He also reported on the Second Gulf War in Iraq. His book Het zijn net mensen (2006, They're just like people) is a report of his experiences as a news correspondent in the Middle East, and quickly became a bestseller in the Netherlands. The book has since been translated and published in Denmark, Germany, Hungary, Italy, Australia, the United States, France and Slovenia. The title in English is Fit to Print (Australia), Hello, Everybody! (United Kingdom) or People Like Us (United States).

In People Like Us, Luyendijk tells the story of his five years as a correspondent in the Middle East. He chronicles first-hand experiences of dictatorship, occupation, terror, and war. His stories cast light on a number of major crises, from the Iraq War to the Israeli-Palestinian conflict, along with less-reported issues such as underage orphan trash-collectors in Cairo. The more he witnessed, the less he understood, and he became increasingly aware of the yawning gap between what he saw on the ground and what was later reported in the media.

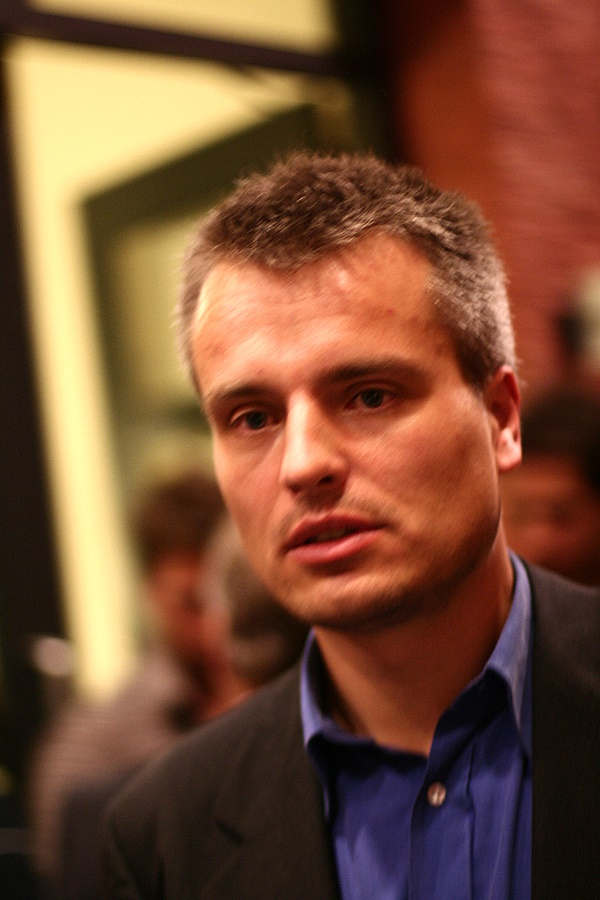
Joris Luyendijk in 2006

From 2006, Joris Luyendijk was living in Amsterdam. In the summer of 2006 and 2007 he carried out interviews for the in-depth interview programme Zomergasten (Summer Guests) on VPRO. From January 2010, he held the Leonardo Chair at the University of Tilburg, and taught the masterclass “Journalism for the 21st Century”. Luyendijk studied Arabic in Amsterdam and Cairo.

In September 2010 Joris Luyendijk was asked to shadow the Dutch Parliament and government in The Hague for a month, resulting in a book on Dutch politics, titled Je hebt het niet van mij, maar... ("You didn't hear it from me, but..."). From 2011 Luyendijk was based in London where he worked for The Guardian. In 2017 he returned to the Netherlands, citing Brexit as the reason. In "The Joris Luyendijk Banking Blog" he provided an anthropological perspective on the financial world. In Dutch-language newspapers NRC Handelsblad and De Standaard Luyendijk commented weekly on his life in the City. His book about the City Swimming with Sharks has appeared in over fifteen countries and was the best-selling book of 2015 in the Netherlands.

== Bibliography ==
- 1998: Een goede man slaat soms zijn vrouw (A Good Man Sometimes Beats His Wife)
- 2001: Een tipje van de sluier. Islam voor beginners (A tip of the veil. Islam for beginners)
- 2006: Het zijn net mensen. Beelden uit het Midden-Oosten (They are just like people. Images from the Middle East), translated into English as People like us: Misrepresenting the Middle East (UK, 2009), Fit to Print: Misrepresenting the Middle East (Australia, 2009), and Hello Everybody!: One Journalist's Search for Truth in the Middle East (USA, 2010)
- 2008: Het maakbare nieuws. Antwoord op Joris Luyendijk (The engineered news. Answer to Joris Luyendijk) (contribution)
- 2010: Je hebt het niet van mij, maar... Een maand aan het binnenhof (You didn't hear it from me, but... A month at the Binnenhof)
- 2015: Dit kan niet waar zijn (This cannot be true), translated into English as Swimming With Sharks
- 2017: Kunnen we praten (Can we talk)
- 2022: De zeven vinkjes (The seven checkmarks). Uitgeverij Pluim. 2022. ISBN 9789493256675.
