= Qisda ES900 =

- Developer: Qisda OEM/ODM AUO Optronics
- Manufacturer: Qisda OEM/ODM
- Type: e-book reader
- Released: 2011
- Operating system: Linux UI Engine QT embedded 4.5.1; OS: Linux 2.6.21
- CPU: Samsung S3C2416 ARM9 @ 400MHz
- Memory: 128 MB (MDDR),
- Storage: Internal: 2GB (NAND); External: microSD/microSDHC
- Display: 9-inch (230 mm) SiPix
- Graphics: 1024 × 768, 150 ppi density, 16 levels of grayscale
- Sound: built-in speakers (0.5W)
- Input: touchscreen, 7 keys
- Touchpad: Capacitive
- Connectivity: Wi-Fi b/g, microUSB high speed, audio jack Optional: 3.5G HSDPA
- Power: 1530 mAh, 3.7 V
- Dimensions: 166.9 × 227.8 × 10.5 mm
- Weight: 487 gram (without Wi-Fi)
- Predecessor: Qisda ES600

Qisda ES900 is a discontinued electronic-book reader developed by Qisda Corporation and based on a Linux platform. The device is sold under various brand names worldwide.

== Features ==
Qisda ES900 provides a 16 levels of grayscale SiPix touchscreen display for viewing digital content. Pages are turned using the buttons on the device or touchscreen. The ES900 connects to the internet through available Wi-Fi connections. Users can read books without a wireless connection. Disconnecting the wireless connection can prolong the battery life.

== Specifications ==
CPU

- Samsung 2416 ARM9 @ 400 MHz

OS

- Linux 2.6.21

Memory

- 128 MB (MDDR)
- 2 GB (NAND)
- External microSD/microSDHC (up to 16 GB)

Connectivity

- Wi-Fi b/g
  Optional: 3.5G HSDPA
- microUSB high speed
- audio jack

Miscellaneous

- 1530 mAh, 3.7 V
- 487 gram (without Wi-Fi)
- Reading mode

- > 10.000 pages (Wi-Fi off)

== Formats supported ==
Text

- ePUB
- HTML
- PDF
- RTF
- TXT

Picture

- BMP
- JPEG
- PNG

Audio

- MP3

== Sold as ==
The device is sold worldwide under various brand names.

Asia

- Taiwan: Asus Eee Reader DR900 / TZ900

Europe

- Asus Eee Reader DR900 / DR950
- bq Avant XL

== Modification ==
Being that the hardware utilizes Linux-based software it can be changed or improved to the owners content. The firmware is labeled as “QT Software” and varies from vendor to vendor. The upgrade contains multiple image files with the .img extension, along with other system files.

Flashing to upgrade the firmware can be taken advantage of as it does not seem to check if the version that is being installed is older. Due to this, using firmware made by the other vendors on the model each sold in particular is possible.

== Dual-boot ==
The devices seem to contain a native dual-boot capability. When a device specific key combination is pressed during power-on any linux-kernel + ramdisk combination is booted from the sd-card.
