= WNL (broadcaster) =

Dutch public broadcaster

Omroep WNL
- Type: Public broadcasting association
- Branding: Liberal-conservative
- Country: Netherlands
- First air date: 6 September 2010
- Founded: 16 February 2009; 17 years ago
- Official website: wnl.tv

WNL (Dutch pronunciation: [ʋeːɛnˈɛl]) is a public broadcaster within the Dutch public broadcasting system. Founded in 2009, it positions itself as a liberal-conservative broadcaster aimed at a centre-right audience. Its first television broadcast took place on 6 September 2010.

== History ==
WNL was founded in 2009 under the name Wakker Nederland ('Conscious Netherlands') at the initiative of newspaper De Telegraaf. After a successful campaign to secure the required minimum of 50,000 members, the broadcaster was permitted to join the public broadcasting system on the condition that it cut all organisational ties with De Telegraaf. This included abandoning its original name, which echoed the newspaper's slogan De krant van wakker Nederland ('The newspaper of conscious Netherlands'). The broadcaster therefore adopted the abbreviation WNL as its official name.

The broadcaster first aired on 6 September 2010. Its television programmes include the daily breakfast show Goedemorgen Nederland ('Good Morning Netherlands'), and the talk shows WNL op Zondag ('WNL on Sunday') and Café Kockelmann. It also broadcasts the Dutch version of Dragons' Den.

Due to limitations to the number of public broadcasters that can get permanent recognition, WNL has formed a cooperative broadcasting organisation (samenwerkingsomroep) with Omroep Max since 2022, enabling them to operate under a joint broadcasting licence. In 2026, the two broadcasters and KRO-NCRV announced plans to form a shared 'broadcasting house' (omroephuis) by 2029, integrating organisational structures while maintaining distinct identities.

== Identity ==
WNL seeks to strengthen the representation of right-wing viewpoints within the Dutch public broadcasting system, which it regarded to be dominated by left-leaning perspectives. The broadcaster has described its identity as liberal-conservative, broadly aligning with the views of the People’s Party for Freedom and Democracy (VVD) and the Christian Democratic Appeal (CDA). Recurring themes in its programming include entrepreneurship, politics, and Dutch identity.

== Presenters ==
(Former) presenters of WNL include:

- Eva Jinek
- Jort Kelder
- Roos Moggré
- Sander Schimmelpenninck
