= Schimmelpenninck family =

Dutch noble family

Schimmelpenninck
- noble family
- Country: Netherlands
- Founded: 15th century
- Titles: count, baron, jonkheer

The Schimmelpenninck family is an aristocratic family belonging to the Dutch and German nobility, whose members played important political and military roles in the history of the Netherlands, Prussia and later in the German Empire.

== History ==
The first recorded members of the family lived in the 15th century Zutphen and belonged to the political elite of that city.

Two branches exist nowadays:

- Schimmelpenninck van der Oye: descendants of the family in Zutphen. They have the title of baron. The earliest known member is Jacob Schimmelpenninck who is mentioned in Zutphen from 1418 onwards.
- Schimmelpenninck: This branch started with the wine merchant Johan Jacobsz Schimmelpenninck († 1574) who was an illegitimate son of a member of the aforementioned Schimmelpenninck van der Oye family. This branch was granted the title of count in the 19th century, based on the fact that one of its scions, Rutger Jan Schimmelpenninck, played an important role in Dutch politics during the 19th century. Other members of this branch are mentioned in Nederland's Patriciaat.

== Prussian line ==
In 1602 one branch of the Schimmelpenninck van der Oye family came to Prussia as a result of religious disputes. They bought extensive land in Archdiocese of Warmia and changed their spelling to German Schimmelpfennig von der Oye. They were awarded with the title of Baron in the Kingdom of Prussia.

== Coat of arms ==
The coat of arms of the family is two crossed, black keys on a silver surface.

Schimmelpenninck van der Oye coat of arms

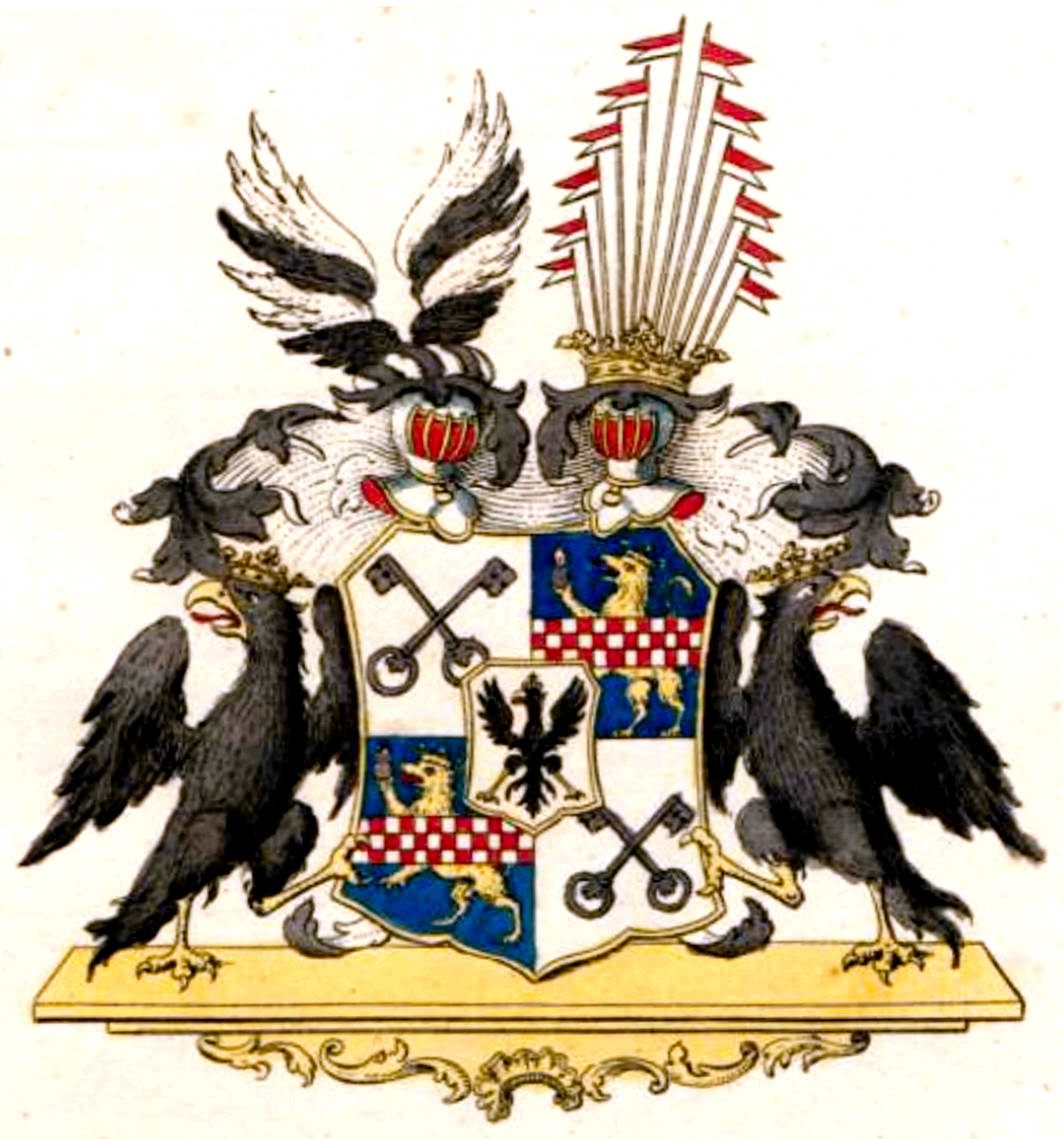
Coat of arms of Barons Schimmelpfennig von der Oye in Prussia

== Notable members ==
- Assueer Jacob Schimmelpenninck van der Oye (1631-1673), son of Jacob, Lord of Voorstonden, and Anna Catharina van Kecken, Lady of Holthuisen. Kept a journal which was published in 1870 by his descendant Alexander Baron Schimmelpenninck van der Oye.
- Gerrit Schimmelpenninck (1794–1863)
- Rutger Jan Schimmelpenninck (1761–1825)
- Willem Anne Schimmelpenninck van der Oye (1800–1872)
- Jan Elias Nicolaas Schimmelpenninck van der Oye (1836–1914)
- Gratia Schimmelpenninck van der Oye (1912–2012)
- Monique Schimmelpenninck, born de Bissy (1923–2009)
- Sander Schimmelpenninck (born 1984)
- Otto Schimmelpennick van der Oije (born 1982)

== Literature ==
- J. B. Rietstap-Wapenboek van den Nederlandschen Adel (deel 2) 1887.
- Nederland's Adelsboek 92 (2006-2007), p. 308-348.
- Nederland's Patriciaat 1 (1910), p. 410-413.
