= Hanneke Groenteman =

Dutch journalist, radio broadcaster and television presenter

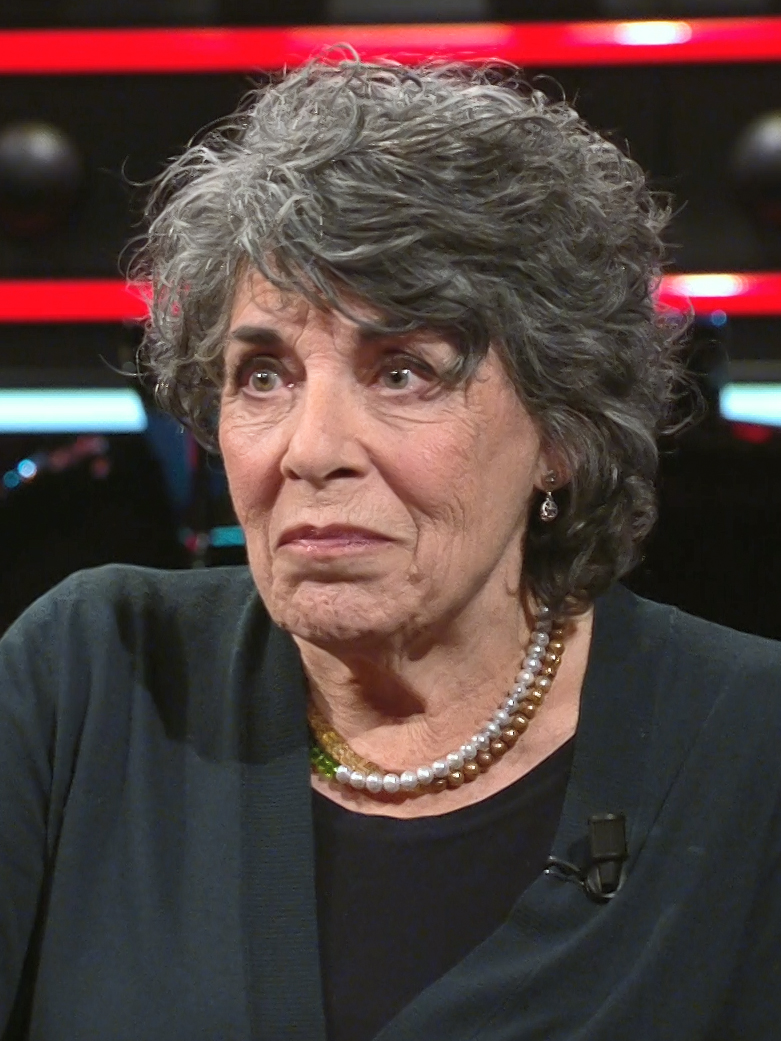
- Groenteman in 2018
- Born: Hanna Groenteman; 20 July 1939 (age 87); Rivierenbuurt, Amsterdam, Netherlands
- Education: Amsterdam
- Occupations: Journalist; Radio reporter Television presenter Author
- Children: Gijs Groenteman
- Parent(s): Michiel Groenteman; Rachel Smit

Hanneke Groenteman is a Dutch journalist, radio broadcaster and television presenter who tends to focus on culture-related topics.

== Early life and education ==
Hanna "Hanneke" Groenteman was born in the Rivierenbuurt quarter, on the south side of Amsterdam. Her parents' home was next to an ice cream parlor. Michiel Groenteman, her father, worked at the Amsterdam stock exchange. Her mother, born Rachel Smit, worked as a stenographer. When she was ten months old the country was invaded. Her early years were in many ways defined by the German occupation. The family was identified as Jewish, and after the order was received to report for deportation they went into hiding. To reduce the risk of discovery, children were separated from their Jewish parents under these circumstances, and Hanneke was accommodated in a succession of secret locations, organised by the Utrecht Children's Committee ("Utrechts Kindercomité"). Her longest wartime placement was also the last: for eighteen months between 1943 and 1945 she lived with the Van Starkenburgs, a loving family of committed Christians, in the village of Rijnsburg, close to the coastal resort of Katwijk. She bonded closely with her "aunt", Cor van Starkenburg, and has remained close to the von Starkenburg family subsequently. After the war she returned to her birth-parents' Amsterdam home, now in the house of an uncle who had died in the war. The mood was troubled. The family had survived, but plenty of relatives and family friends had not. Her father's mother had been murdered at Sobibór. Her mother's parents, however, were now living with the family. The child pined for "Aunt Cor and Uncle Kees" while finding her relationship with her birth-parents difficult ("moeizaam").

She attended the nearby Spinoza Lyceum (school) and then undertook a secretarial training with the Schoevers "business school" before studying French for several years at the university. As a student she was a member of the student movement "Politeia" and of the "Young Socialists" ("Socialistische Jeugd").

== Career ==
=== Journalist ===
Groenteman then took a job with Het Parool, a mass circulation Amsterdam daily newspaper. She worked initially as a type setter and then, between 1962 and 1973, as a journalist. For four years during the mid-1970s she was employed on an innovative education related project by the psychologist Co van Calcar. She started working for the Omroepvereniging VARA in 1975. On 30 April 1980, together with the radical journalist Stan van Houcke, and in collaboration with Amsterdam's independent STAD radio, she reported on the rioting that accompanied the new queen's coronation. Although the riots were instigated as a protest against the housing shortage under the slogan "No homes, no coronation" ("Geen woning, geen kroning"), their scale and the accompanying violence led to suggestions that many of the participants had arrived with a larger agenda, and there was a public backlash against the protestors. It was very clear that both Groenteman and Stan van Houcke - with the backing of VARA radio director Piet van den Ende - sympathised with the squatter movement. There were questions (kamervraag) in parliament. The affair cost the radio station a severe reduction in listenership initially, but in the longer term lost radio audiences were quite soon replaced by a new generation of listeners.

=== Television ===
She subsequently moved across to the VPRO (public television operator): for seven years she presented the arts programme "De Plantage". In 1998 she was also the presenter of the prestigious Zomergasten programme. She was a presenter of B&W during 2004/2005. From 2007 till 2015 she presented Sterren op het Doek for Omroep MAX. In her final programme, without having been warned, she found that she herself was the subject of the programme when Matthijs van Nieuwkerk turned up and took over the presenter's role.

=== Author ===
Her first book, published in October 2003, was "Doorzakken bij Jamin" (loosely "Too much Jamin"), a compilation of 23 stories about her childhood, her infatuation with Audrey Hepburn, her feminism, men, children, her stillborn baby daughter and her struggle with obesity. The book was illustrated by Peter van Straaten. The Jamin (Retail chain) reacted adversely to her title choice, demanding that it be changed. Her second book, "Dikke dame" ("Fat Lady"), concerned a man who was displayed at a fair as a fat lady, and appeared in February 2006. Her third book, "Bestemming bereikt?" (loosely "Objective achieved?"), described her experience as an overweight woman who had lost 45 kg (more than 100 pounds) following a surgical procedure in 2006 to reduce the size of her stomach. The books were subsequently bundled together and republished as a single stout volume.

== Personal ==
Hanneke Groenteman's marriage ended after ten years. Gijs Groenteman, her son, was born in 1974, and is also a journalist. Gijs was 23 before his mother introduced him to his father. A good relationship between the two of them ensued.

Hanneke Groenteman is a grandmother.
