= Quote (magazine) =

Dutch magazine

- Cover of the October 2024 issue
- Editor: Paul van Riessen
- Former editors: Jort Kelder, Sander Schimmelpenninck
- Frequency: Monthly
- Publisher: Luc van Os
- Founder: Maarten van den Biggelaar
- First issue: November 1986
- Company: Hearst Communications
- Country: Netherlands
- Based in: Amsterdam
- Website: www.quotenet.nl
- ISSN: 0920-8275

Quote is a Dutch monthly magazine that focuses on business, money, careers, networks and lives of people at the top.

The business magazine was founded in 1986 by Maarten van den Biggelaar. Co-founders and first chief-editors were Peter van der Klugt and Mark Blaisse. The title refers to a stock quote (the price of shares as quoted on an exchange). The magazine is published by Hearst Communications. The editorial office is based in Amsterdam.

Since 1997, the magazine annually publishes the Quote 500, a list of the 500 wealthiest people in the Netherlands and their relative estimated financial position (similar to the list by American magazine Forbes).

== History ==
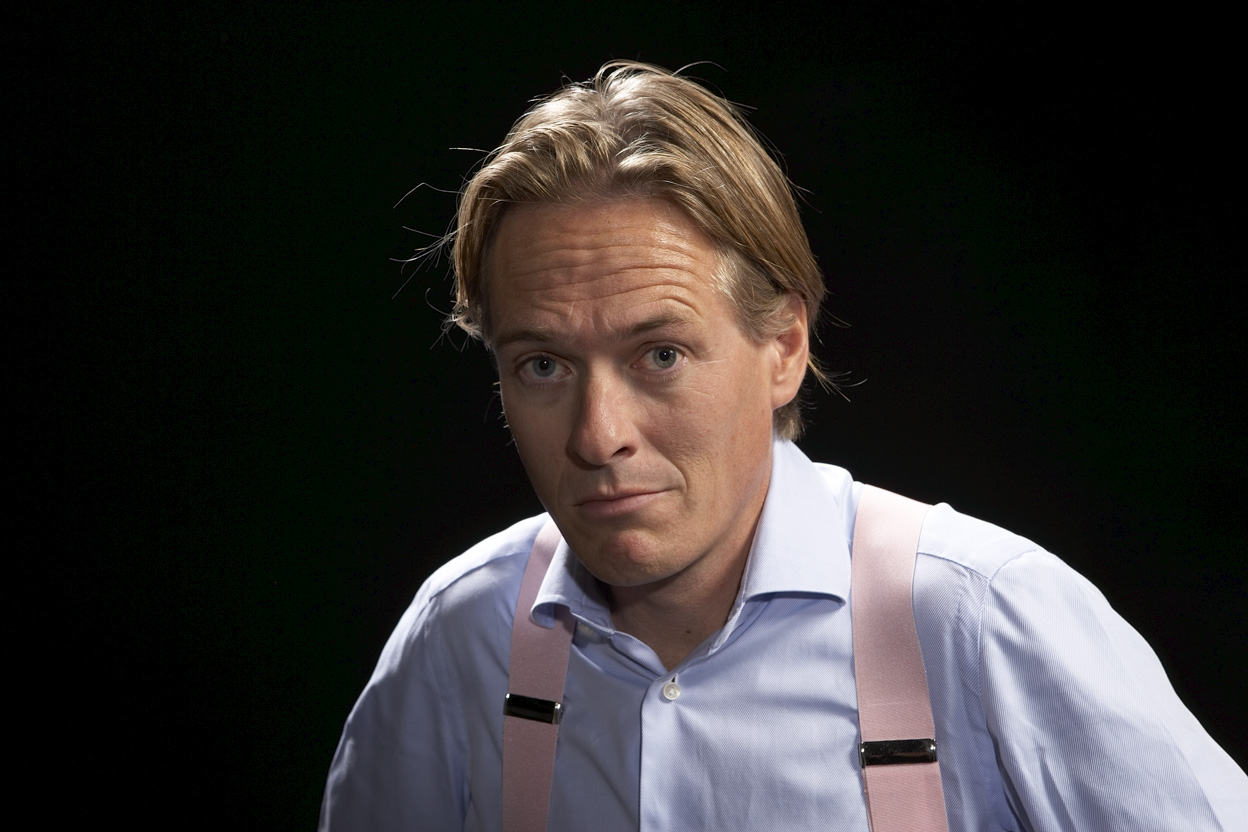
Former chief-editor Jort Kelder.

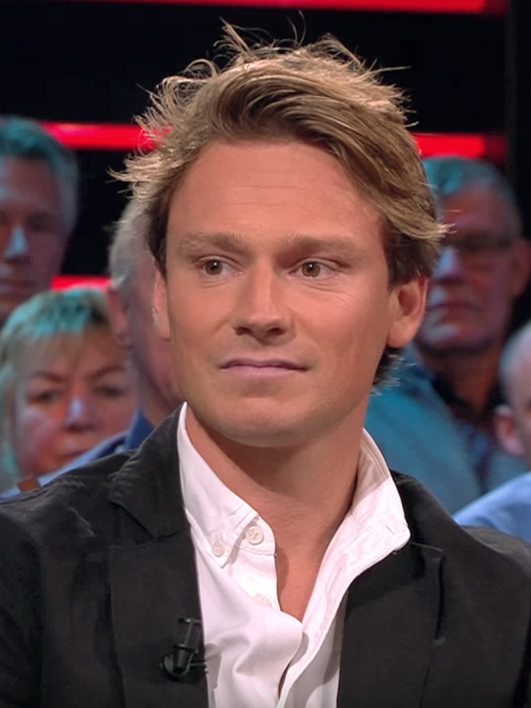
Former chief-editor Sander Schimmelpenninck.

After Van der Klugt and Blaisse, Jort Kelder became the third editor-in-chief of Quote in 1993. Under his leadership, the first Quote 500 list was published in 1997. In 1998 Kelder was elected 'Editor-in-Chief of the Year' by the Nederlands Uitgeversverbond (Dutch Publishers Association) and in December 1999 Quote was awarded 'Magazine of the Year'.

In November 2002, Quote published the first picture of real estate speculator Willem Endstra together with released felon Willem Holleeder, who had served a prison sentence as the convicted kidnapper of beer magnate Alfred Heineken. The two were sitting on a bench outside Endstra's offices in the Amsterdam Oud-Zuid borough. Endstra, who had always denied his links with the underworld, filed for a preliminary injunction demanding that Quote be withdrawn from sale. He said he feared for his safety. Initially, his claim was upheld, but a few days later the injunction was overturned. Endstra was murdered two years later, and Holleeder was reimprisoned after having been convicted on a charge of extortion.

Quote's editorial office was shot at in November 2003; nineteen bullets were fired at the building in the middle of the night. The culprit was never found. A few days earlier, the house of Quote-owner Van den Biggelaar had been shot at as well.

In January 2005, Quote made headlines with the claim that in 1998, Nina Brink, the founder of World Online, a Dutch Internet service provider, had been involved in a premeditated sex scandal and had forced the chairman of the board to resign. Brink announced that she would take legal action, but failed to bring a lawsuit. A declaration that she subsequently filed with the Amsterdam public prosecutor to support her libel claim was declared inadmissible in May due to the lack of solid legal basis.

On 21 July 2006, Maarten van den Biggelaar and the two co-owners sold Quote to Hachette Filipacchi Médias (HFM). As a result, Kelder stepped down as editor-in-chief in April 2007, after more than thirteen years.

He was succeeded by Sjoerd van Stokkum (2007-2011) and then by Mirjam van den Broeke (2011-2016). Former chief-editor Jort Kelder temporarily returned to the business magazine in 2011 as an advisor and also as a columnist. Subsequent editors-in-chief were Sander Schimmelpenninck (2016-2020), Paul van Riessen (2021-2025) and Meindert Schut (2025-).

== Editors-in-chief ==
- Peter van der Klugt (co-founder of Quote)
- Mark Blaisse (co-founder of van Quote)
- Jort Kelder (1993-2007)
- Sjoerd van Stokkum (2007-2011)
- Mirjam van den Broeke (2011-2016)
- Sander Schimmelpenninck (2016-2020)
- Paul van Riessen (2021-2025)
- Meindert Schut (2025-)

== Copies ==
Total paid circulation, as verified by Het Oplage Instituut (HOI), the Dutch institute for media auditing, affiliated with Audit Bureau of Circulations.

- 2000: 36,663
- 2010: 48,181
- 2011: 51,227
- 2012: 51,515
