= Bissy (family) =

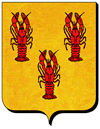
Arms of the Bissy family.

The Bissy family (de) was a French noble family. Members of the family have been poets, generals, bishops, explorers and resistance fighters.

== Coat of arms ==
The coat of arms of the family is three red crayfish on a gold surface.

== Notable members ==
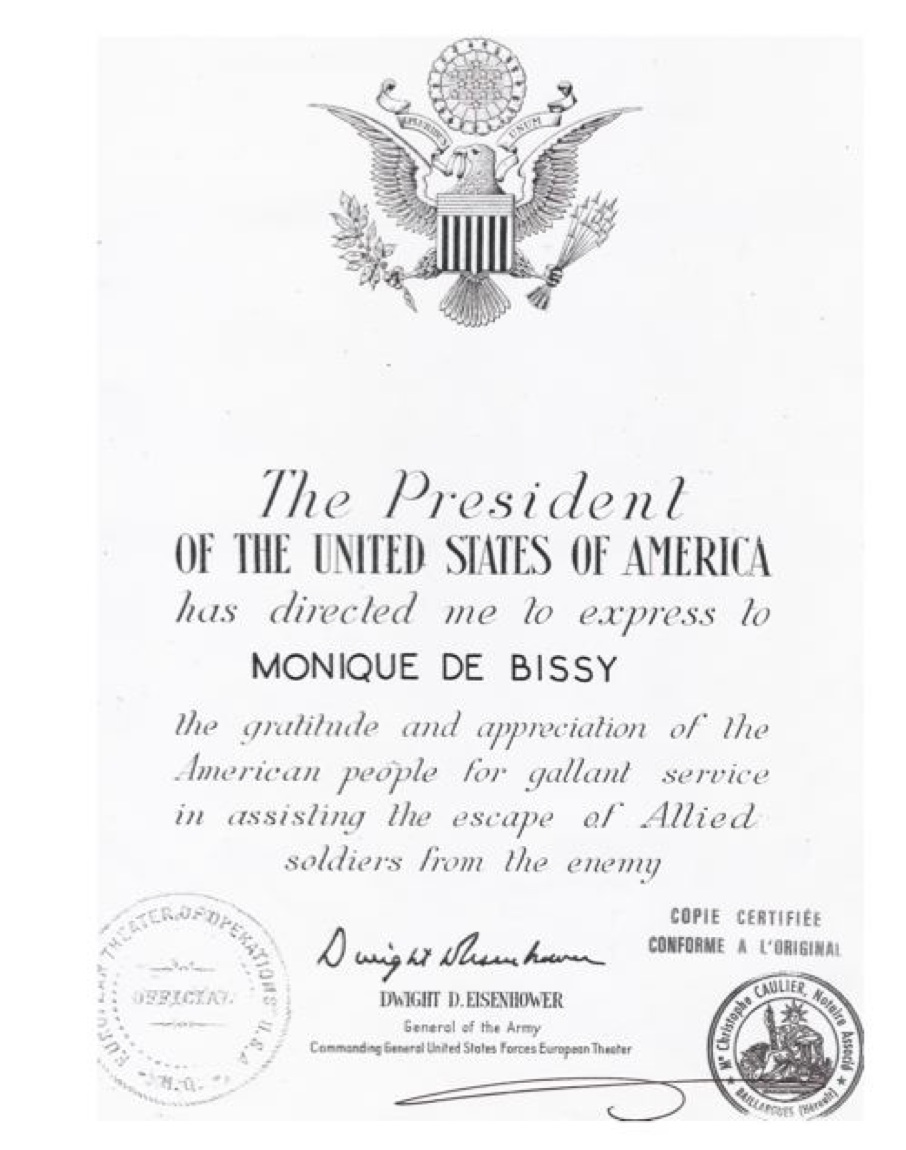

- Pontus de Tyard de Bissy (1521–1605), French poet.
- Héliodore de Thiard de Bissy (1557–1594), Governor of Verdun-sur-le-Doubs.
- Henri-Pons de Thiard de Bissy (1657–1737), Bishop of Toul (1687–1704) and Maux (1704–1737), Cardinal (1715), confident of King Louis XIV of France: he wrote his will and gave him the anointing of the sick before his death.
- Claude de Thiard de Bissy (1721–1810), Head of the French Royal Army during the conquest of Franche-Comté, Governor of Languedoc, member of the Académie française.
- Henri de Thiard de Bissy (1723–1794), Brother of Claude, French general.
- Frédéric de Bissy (1768–1803), French explorer who participated scientific expedition in Southern oceans.
- Monique de Bissy (1923–2009), French resistant during World War II.
