= Peter Buwalda =

Dutch journalist, novelist and editor

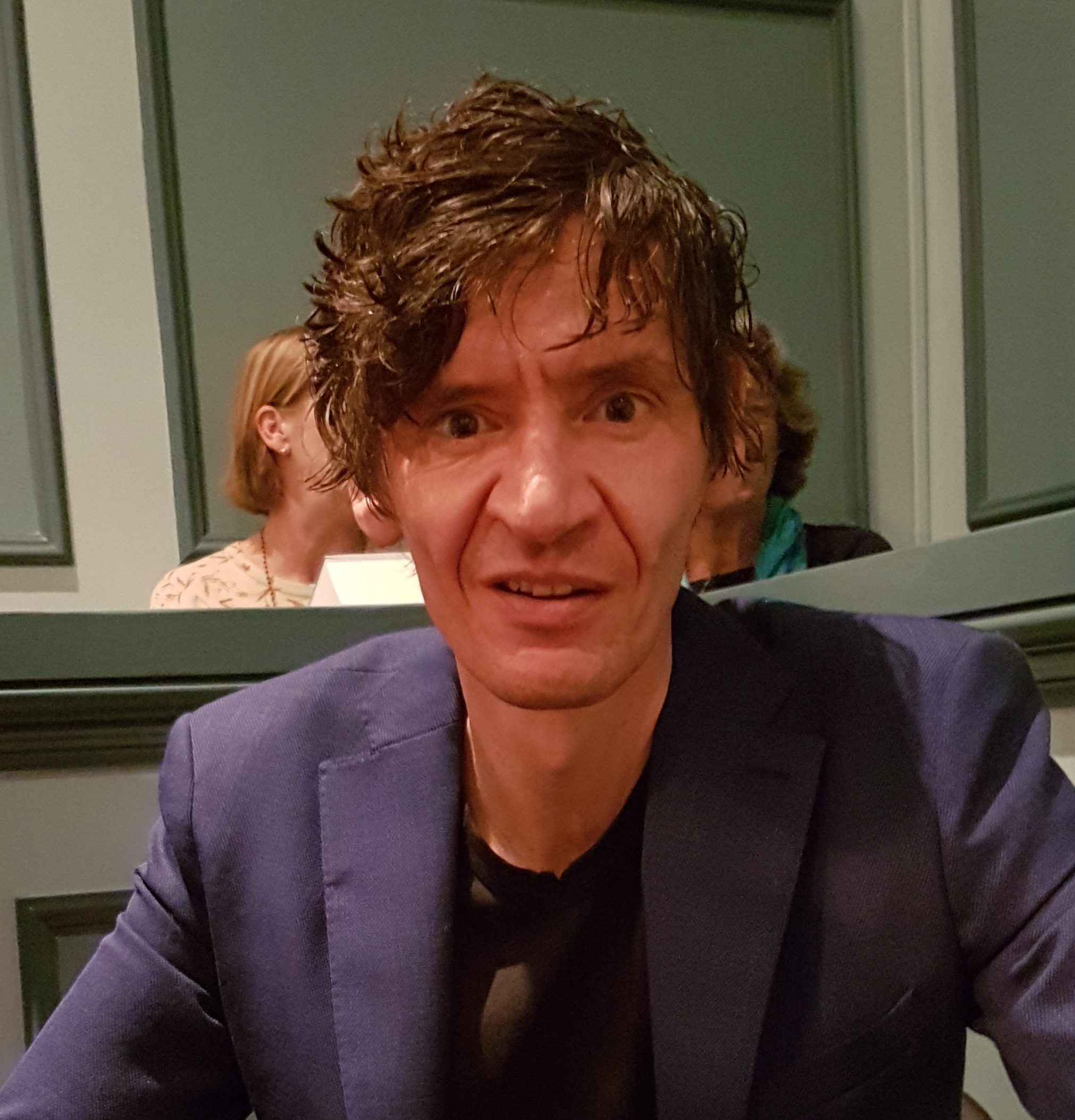
- Buwalda (2019)
- Born: 30 December 1971 (age 54); Brussels, Belgium
- Occupations: Journalist, novelist, editor
- Writing career
- Language: Dutch

Peter Buwalda (Dutch pronunciation: [ˈpeːtər byˈʋɑldaː]; born 30 December 1971) is a Dutch journalist, novelist and editor at various publishing houses.

Buwalda grew up in the village of Blerick and was one of the founders of the Dutch literary magazine Wah-Wah. He wrote essays and stories for multiple magazines, and gained recognition after writing an essay titled "A diversion because of potholes. Bruno Schulz, Franz Kafka, and Leopold von Sacher-Masoch" (original Dutch title: "Een omleiding wegens kuilen. Bruno Schulz, Franz Kafka, en Leopold von Sacher-Masoch"), which appeared in De Gids. Buwalda was editor of Kafka-Katern at the time.

His debut novel Bonita Avenue was published in 2010 by De Bezige Bij, one of the leading publishing houses in the Netherlands, and was subsequently translated into English in 2014 by Jonathan Reeder. The novel was nominated for the Libris Literatuur Prijs 2011, de NS Publieksprijs 2011, de 25th AKO Literatuurprijs, and the Gouden Strop 2011. Buwalda was awarded the Academia Debutantenprijs, the Selexyz Debuutprijs, and the Tzumprijs in 2011, as well as the Anton Wachterprijs in 2012. Critics in the United Kingdom positively received and reviewed the novel.

== Bibliography ==
- Peter Buwalda: Bonita Avenue. Translated by Jonathan Reeder. London, Puskhin Press, 2014. ISBN 978-1-908968-17-3
