= William Buwalda =

William Buwalda (1869–1946) was a United States soldier (private first-class) who gained national attention after being punished with three years' hard labour for shaking hands with anarchist Emma Goldman in the early 1900s after attending a speech by her.

== Early life ==
Buwalda was born in 1869 in the Netherlands and moved to Jamestown Township in Michigan in 1883. He enlisted in the military when he was 23, continuing a family tradition of military service that went back to the Netherlands. Buwalda served five tours of duty and fought in the Spanish–American War. His service was described as “excellent” by the military.

== Buwalda's court martial ==
William Buwalda attended a lecture by the anarchist Emma Goldman at Walton's Pavilion in San Francisco on April 26, 1908. Following the conclusion of the lecture, Buwalda—in uniform—shook her hand and was court-martialed for it in violation of the 62nd Article of War. He was sentenced to three years' hard labour at Alcatraz. However, Buwalda was pardoned by President Theodore Roosevelt after serving only 10 months in prison.

Goldman wrote that General Frederick Funston, who reduced Buwalda's sentence to three years, said that “the first duty of an officer or an enlisted man is unquestioned obedience and loyalty to the government, and it makes no difference whether he approves of that government or not.”

== Buwalda's turn to anarchism ==
Anarchists—including Emma Goldman—contributed greatly to efforts to free Buwalda. Emma Goldman credited the anarchists' efforts for Buwalda's pardon.

While Buwalda was not an anarchist at the time of his arrest and said that he did not hold “anarchistic or disloyal views” during his trial, he eventually came to support anarchist ideas. In 1909, he published a letter in the anarchist journal Mother Earth outlining his reasons for returning his military medals to the United States government.

Buwalda's letter with the returned medals reads:

"Hon. Joseph M. Dickinson,

Secretary of War,

Washington, D.C.

Sir:

After thinking the matter over for some time I have decided to send back this trinket [the medal awarded for faithful service in the Philippines] to your department, having no further use for such baubles, and enable you to give it to some one who will appreciate it more than I do.

It speaks to me of faithful service, of duty well done, of friendships cemented by dangers and hardships and sufferings shared in common in camp and in the field. But, sir, it also speaks to me of bloodshed—possibly some of it unavoidably innocent—in defense of loved ones, of homes; homes in many cases but huts of grass, yet cherished none the less.

It speaks of raids and burnings, of many prisoners taken, and like vile beasts, thrown in the foulest of prisons. And for what? For fighting for their homes and loved ones.

It speaks to me of G.O. 100, with all its attendant horrors and cruelties and sufferings; of a country laid waste with fire and sword; of animals useful to man wantonly killed; of men, women and children hunted like wild beasts, and all of this in the name of Liberty, Humanity, and Civilization.

In short, it speaks to me of War—legalized murder, if you will—upon a weak and defenceless people. We have not even the excuse of self-defence.

Yours sincerely, Wm. Buwalda R. R. No. 3

Hudsonville, Michigan"

Over the next, several years Buwalda contributed to the anarchist movement while living in rural West Michigan. He organized several lectures for Emma Goldman in Grand Rapids and networked with other anarchists across the country.
