= Claude de Thiard de Bissy =

Claude de Thiard de Bissy (13 October 1721, Paris – 26 September 1810, Pierre-de-Bresse) was a French soldier. He served his military career, rising to lieutenant-général des armées du roi in 1762 (the same day as his younger brother Henri, comte de Thiard) and fighting in the conquest of Franche-Comté and becoming governor of Languedoc and Auxonne.

== Biography ==
The son of Claude, 7th count of Bissy (died 2 July 1723) and Sylvie Angélique Andrault de Langeron, he was thus a descendant of the poet Pontus de Tyard. He was elected a member of the Académie Française in 1750 and remained a member for 60 years. He wrote a Histoire d'Ema ou de l'âme (1752).

== Bibliography ==
- Bernard Alis, Les Thiard, guerriers et beaux esprits. Claude et Henri-Charles de Thiard de Bissy, et leur famille, L'Harmattan, Paris, 1997.
- Nouvelle biographie générale. Firmin Didot, 1866.
