= Jort Kelder =

Dutch television presenter (born 1964)

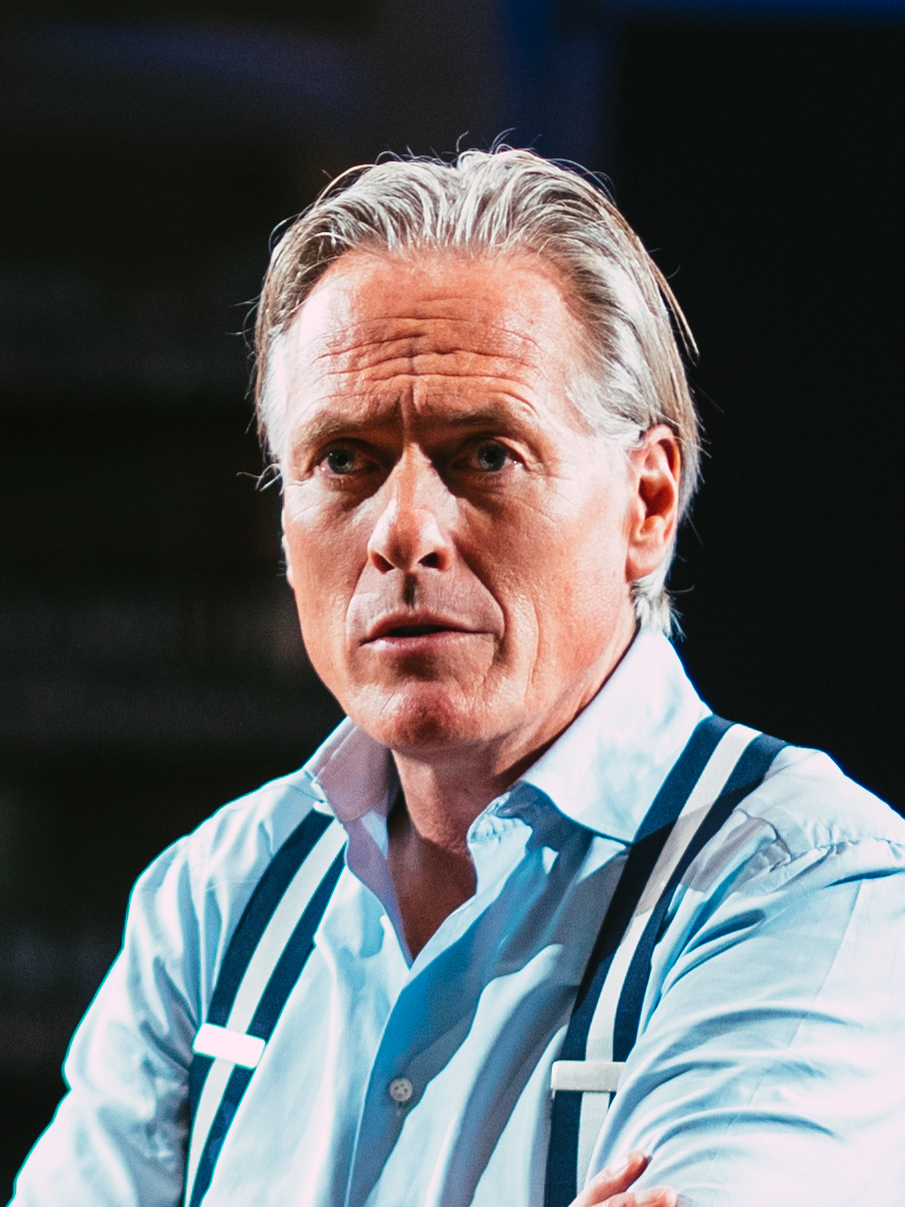
- Kelder in 2021
- Born: 22 September 1964 (age 61); Gouda, Netherlands
- Known for: Journalist, columnist, television host
- Notable work: Quote (1990–2007), Bij ons in de PC (2007–2009), Hoe heurt het eigenlijk? (2011–2016), Op1 (2020–2024)

Jort Kelder (born 22 September 1964) is a Dutch journalist, columnist, television and radio presenter and podcast host.

From 1993 to 2007 he was chief editor of the monthly magazine Quote. He presented, amongst others, the television programs Bij ons in de PC (2007–2009), Hoe heurt het eigenlijk? (2011–2016) and Op1 (2020–2024); and the radio program dr Kelder en Co (from 2018). He also co-authored books such as Man & Pak (1996) and Oud geld (2002).

== Career ==
Kelder studied Dutch law at Utrecht University (1983–1990). On the side he was a press officer on the board of the political liberal youth organization JOVD from 1987 to 1989. He was also executive editor of the JOVD association magazine, the Driemaster, for which he made interviews and photo reports.

After an intership at the business magazine Quote he became an editor at Quote in 1990. In December 1993, he became editor-in-chief of the magazine. In 1998, he was elected 'Editor-in-Chief of the Year' by the Dutch Magazine Media Association (MMA) and in December 1999 Quote was awarded 'Magazine of the Year'.

From 1993 onwards Kelder also wrote articles and columns for news papers NRC Handelsblad and Het Parool. From October 1997 to June 1999 Kelder was co-editor-in-chief of the magazine QPF as well. In April 2007, after the takeover of Quote by Hachette Filipacchi Médias, he decided to step down as editor-in-chief of the magazine. He was succeeded bij Sjoerd van Stokkum.

Jort Kelder co-authored several books, including Man & Pak, with Yvo van Regteren Altena (1996); Oud geld, also with Van Regteren Altena (2002); and Het Euro Evangelie, with Arno Wellens (2014).

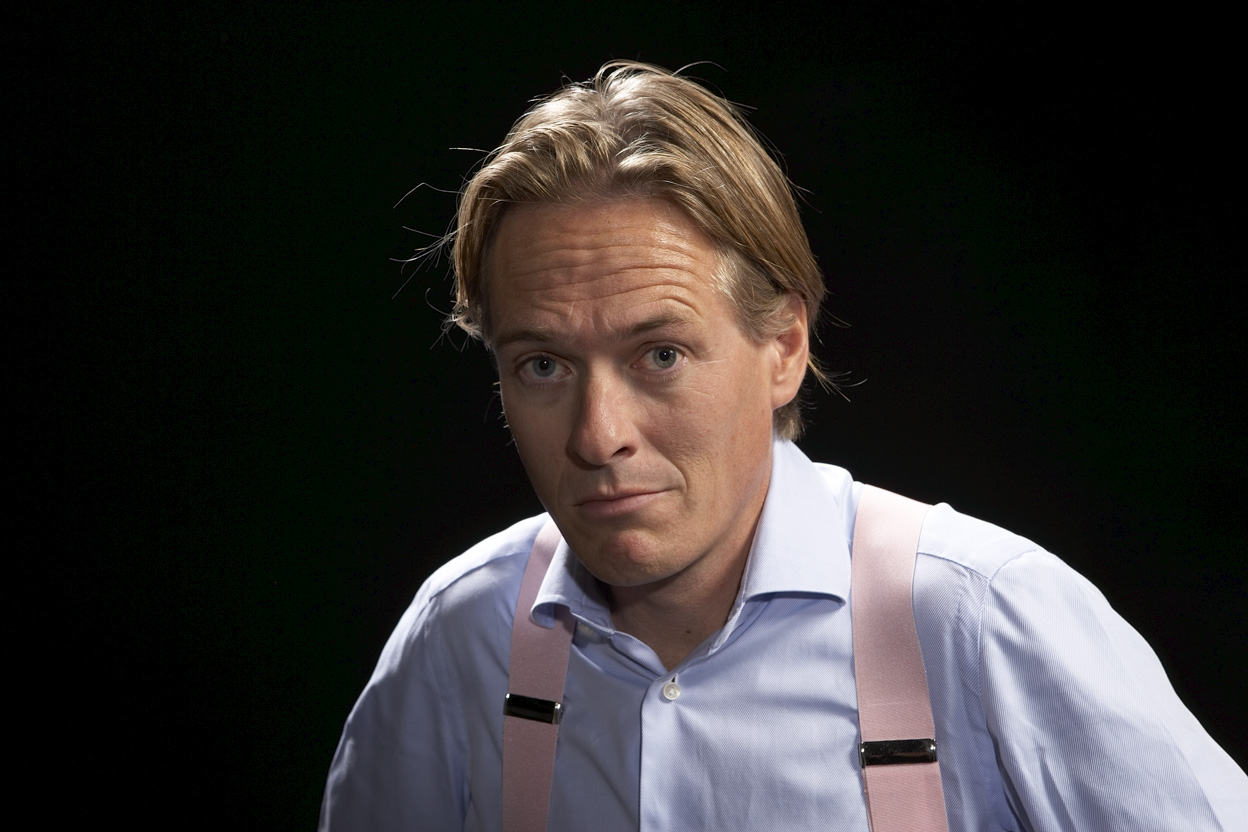

Since 2000, Kelder has presented various television programmes, including Kelder & Co (2000, Net5), Dragons' Den (2007–2008, KRO), Bij ons in de PC (2007–2009, KRO) and Hoe heurt het eigenlijk? (2011–2016, AVRO).

He also presented the talk shows Buitenhof (2018–2019, AVROTROS and VPRO) and Op1, in a duo presentation with Welmoed Sijtsma (2020–2024, WNL).

Since 2018, Jort Kelder is hosting the radio programme dr Kelder en Co on NPO Radio 1 (AVROTROS) on Saturday afternoons. Since that same year, the podcast De Jortcast has been released multiple times a week, with conversations based on this radio programme. From February 2022, he also hosts a biweekly podcast called De Snobcast, together with Yvo van Regteren Altena.

Since April 2023, is a columnist for the financial news paper Het Financieele Dagblad.

== Personal life ==
Kelder was previously in relationships with actress Georgina Verbaan and television presenter Lauren Verster.

In 2024, Jort Kelder won a lawsuit against Google on appeal. The company had done too little against fraudulent bitcoin advertisements in which the faces of famous Dutch people were misused. Google was liable for the damage that Kelder had suffered.

== Awards ==
- 1994: Jonge Haan, for emerging talent, awarded by the Genootschap voor Reclame (Society for Advertising)
- 1998: Editor-in-Chief of the Year, Mercur awarded by the Magazine Media Association (MMA), professional awards for the magazine media industry
- 1999: Magazine of the Year, Mercur for business magazine Quote, of which Jort Kelder was chief editor at the time
- 2020: Pim Fortuyn Prize, for opinion makers fighting for free speech, awarded by Simon Fortuyn and Leonard Ornstein

== Books ==
- 1996 – Jort Kelder and Yvo van Regteren Altena, Man & Pak. Over de noodzaak van kleren op maat, kasjmier sokken en andere uiterlijkheden. Prometheus, 131 pp.
- 1999 – Jort Kelder and Yvo van Regteren Altena, Extravaganza! Basics voor de bezittende klasse. Prometheus, 143 pp.
- 2002 – Yvo van Regteren Altena, Binnert de Beaufort, Jort Kelder, Oud geld. Het verborgen leven van de stille elite. Prometheus, 150 pp.
- 2007 – Jort Kelder and Yvo van Regteren Altena, Pak op zak. Wat mag aan en wat moet uit?. Prometheus, 112 pp.
- 2009 – Harry Veenendaal and Jort Kelder, ZKH. Hoog spel aan het hof van Zijne Koninklijke Hoogheid. De geheime dagboeken van mr. dr. I.G. van Maasdijk. Gopher, 116 pp. (Van Maasdijk was the private secretary of prince Bernhard)
- 2014 – Arno Wellens and Jort Kelder, Het Euro Evangelie. Waarom het misgaat met onze munt. Gopher, 84 pp.

== Television and radio ==
=== Television programmes ===
- 2000, Kelder & Co (lifestyle, Net5)
- 2002, We zijn zo terug (advertising quiz, Net5)
- 2003, Testbeeld (Veronica)
- 2005, NSE (news program, co-presenter, Talpa)
- 2006, Parla, (talk show, KRO)
- 2007–2008, Dragons' Den (KRO)
- 2007–2009, Bij ons in de PC (KRO)
- 2009, Topverkopers (KRO)
- 2009, Belastingen: is betalen voor de dommen? (KRO)
- 2010, Bij ons in de BV (KRO)
- 2011–2016, Hoe heurt het eigenlijk? (AVRO)
- 2012, Het snelle geld (VPRO)
- 2017, Ten Strijde! (AVROTROS)
- 2017–2018, Het Pronkstuk van Nederland (AVROTROS)
- 2018, De Wereld van Morgen (AVROTROS)
- 2018–2019, Buitenhof (talk show, AVROTROS, VPRO)
- 2019, Kelder & Klöpping (AVROTROS)
- 2020, Van oud geld, de dingen, die niet voorbij gaan (AVROTROS)
- 2020–2024, Op1 (talk show, duo-presentation with Welmoed Sijtsma, WNL)

=== Radio program ===
- 2018–..., Dr Kelder en Co (AVROTROS)

=== Podcasts ===
- 2018–..., De Jortcast (AVROTROS)
- 2022–..., De Snobcast, with Yvo van Regteren Altena (Tonny Media)
- 2025–..., Bubbels!, with Hannah Prins (Tuinhuis Media)
