= Thomas Erdbrink =

Dutch journalist (born 1976)

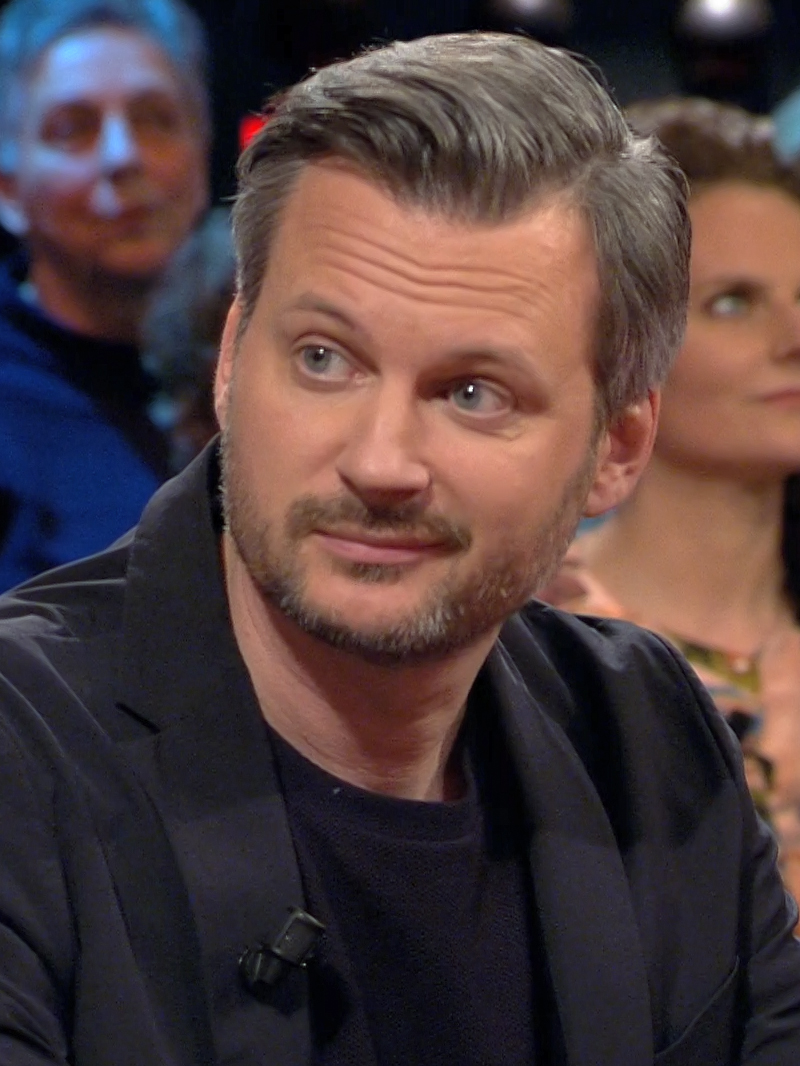
- Thomas Erdbrink (DWDD, 2018)
- Born: January 27, 1976 (age 49); Leiderdorp, Netherlands
- Occupation: Journalist
- Employer: The New York Times
- Spouse: Newsha Tavakolian (m. 2003)

Thomas Erdbrink (Dutch pronunciation: [ˈtoːmɑs ˈɛrtbrɪŋk]; born January 27, 1976) is a Dutch journalist who is the Northern Europe bureau chief for The New York Times, covering Nordic countries and the Netherlands. He was from 2012 until 2019 the Tehran Bureau Chief for The New York Times. Erdbrink was at the time one of the few Western reporters accredited for U.S. media in Iran.

Erdbrink has a B.A. in journalism from HU University of Applied Sciences Utrecht. From 2008 to 2012 he served as The Washington Post bureau chief in Tehran and was succeeded by Jason Rezaian. He is fluent in Dutch, English, Persian and German and regularly appears on European and American media outlets.

Erdbrink's TV documentary series Onze man in Teheran (Our man in Tehran) won the 2015 Zilveren Nipkowschijf.

In June 2019, The New York Times publicized that Iranian authorities had revoked Erdbrink's press credentials in late February 2019 and he has been unable to perform work in the country since then.

== Personal life ==
Erdbrink is married to Iranian photographer and journalist Newsha Tavakolian.
