= De Slegte =

Netherlands-based bookstore chain

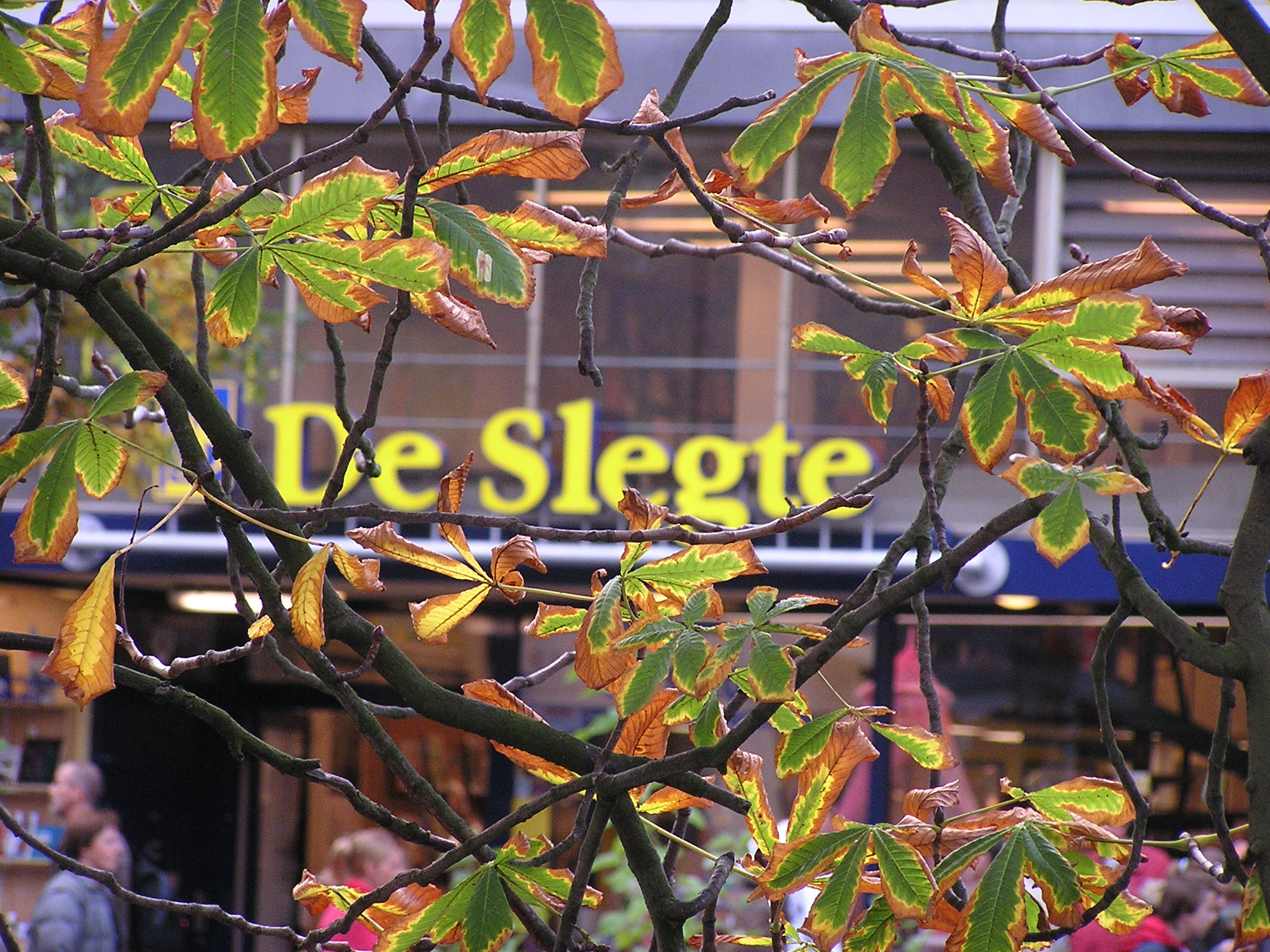
- Industry: Retail (Specialty)
- Founded: Early 20th century
- Founder: Jan de Slegte
- Headquarters: Almere, Netherlands
- Number of locations: 7
- Website: www.deslegte.be www.deslegte.nl

De Slegte is an Almere, Netherlands-based store chain that sells and buys new books (often excessive stock), secondhand books and study books. Between 1 July 2013 and 19 March 2014 De Slegte and another chain of bookstores, Selexyz, combined forces as Polare. After Polare Nederland went bankrupt in 2014, the Belgian branches were bought back by the De Slegte family and changed to their original names. Four branches in Belgium continue to operate, three branches in the Netherlands were added.

== History ==
=== 1908–2013: De Slegte ===
Jan de Slegte started buying and selling books from a wagon in 1908. He was a lamplighter in Rotterdam who started engaging in commerce as a side business. When his profession became obsolete, selling books became his main focus. In 1920 he opened his first bookstore. His son joined and sold books on the street market. Throughout the 20th century, the business expanded and grew into a prominent book chain in the Netherlands and Flanders.

=== 1992–2013: BGN and Selexyz ===
Boekhandels Groep Nederland was one of the larger chains of bookstores in the Netherlands, running 16 branches in Dutch cities, including historic bookstores such as Donner in Rotterdam, one of Europe's largest bookstores; and the Domicanen in Maastricht, located in a 13th-century Dominican church building and cited as an outstanding example of adaptive reuse. Originally, BGN bookstores carried their own name, in combination with the old BGN-logo.

In 2006 every store was rebranded to carry the Selexyz brand name followed by its individual name, for example, Selexyz Scheltema. In April 2012, Selexyz's holding company filed for bankruptcy and sold the chain to Dutch investment company ProCures for €3.5 million. Initially the stores continued as Selexyz.

=== 2013–2014: Polare ===
The Selexyz operations were combined with those of the 26-store second-hand book store chain De Slegte into a new company, owned 60% by ProCures and 40% by the De Slegte family. The combined company's new name, Polare, was introduced in June 2013. Polare was short for Stella Polare, the Northern Star, which was conceived to be a "guiding light" for the book-buying customers.

On January 28, 2014, Polare closed all its Dutch stores after having sailed into rough financial waters; as they -roughly translated- put it themselves, to "reassess their future strategy". On February 7, Polare filed for an extension of payment. Extensive talks with several large banks and the CB, formerly called Centraal Boekhuis, resulted in green light from some of the banks; but the CB (supplying every single Dutch bookstore) already had come into conflict with Polare about overdue payments in late January, and it effectively blocked the salvation-effort of the Polare chain.

=== 2014–: De Slegte is back ===
Some of the Dutch stores restarted under previous names at old or new locations. The Belgian branches of Polare continued as De Slegte.

In 2020 there are 4 De Slegte bookstores in Belgium (Antwerp, Ghent, Leuven, and Mechelen) and 3 stores in the Netherlands (Amsterdam, Leiden, and Rotterdam).

== See also ==
- Books in the Netherlands
