= Expeditie Robinson 2019 =

Season of television series

- Season 20
- Presented by: Kaj Gorgels & Nicolette Kluijver
- No. of days: 33
- No. of castaways: 20
- Winner: Hugo Kennis
- Runner-up: Eva Cleven
- Location: Caramoan, Philippines
- No. of episodes: 16

Release
- Original release: 1 September – 15 December 2019

Season chronology
- ← Previous; 2018 Next → 2020

Expeditie Robinson 2019 is the twentieth season of the Dutch version of the Swedish television series Expedition Robinson. This season is the first season since Expeditie Robinson 2016 to feature celebrities only.

Twenty Dutch celebrities participate to win €25,000 and win the title of Robinson 2019. This is also the first season to be hosted by former contestant Kaj Gorgels who took over co-hosting the series from Dennis Weening. The season premiered on 1 September 2019. Two former winners, Carlos Platier Luna, winner of Expeditie Robinson 2017, and Fatima Moreira de Melo, winner of Expeditie Robinson 2012, returned in the first episode to celebrate the 20th anniversary of Expeditie Robinson.

For the first time ever, the finale had to be postponed. When, on day 32, Hugo and Eva were already out of bullets in the final part of the challenge, Shary-An, who was two stages behind, was eliminated and Hugo and Eva had to do a shoot out to determine the winner. However, because of severe weather conditions, this shoot out had to be postponed to the next day, making this expedition last for 33 days instead of the initiated 32.

== Finishing order ==
Contestant	Original Tribe	Swapped Tribe	Merged Tribe	Main Game	Devil's Island	Finish
Anita Heilker; 58, Singer	South Team			1st voted out Day 3		20th Day 3
Jaap van Deurzen; 66, Reporter	South Team			2nd voted out Day 5		19th Day 5
Berdien Stenberg; 61, Flute Player	Devil's Island			Lost challenge Day 1	Lost challenge Day 7	18th Day 7
Dionne "OnneDi" Slagter; 29, YouTuber	South Team			3rd voted out Day 7		17th Day 7
Rob Geus; 47, TV Presenter	Devil's Island			Lost challenge Day 1	Lost challenge Day 8	16th Day 8
Eva Cleven; Returned to game	Devil's Island			Lost challenge Day 1	Won challenge Day 8	
Roy Donders; 28, TV Personality, Stylist & Singer	North Team	North Team		4th voted out Day 10	Refused offer Day 10	15th Day 10
Frank van der Lende; 30, Radio DJ	South Team	North Team		Left competition Day 13		14th Day 13
Rijk Hofman; 22, YouTuber	Devil's Island	Devil's Island		Lost challenge Day 1	Lost challenge Day 15	13th Day 15
Akwasi Owusu Ansah; Returned to game	South Team	South Team		6th voted out Day 15	Won challenge Day 15	
Kim Kötter; 36, Model	North Team	South Team		5th voted out Day 12	Lost challenge Day 17	12th Day 17
Mariana Verkerk; Returned to game	North Team	South Team		Lost challenge Day 16	Won challenge Day 17	
Kelvin "Kalvijn" Boerma; 23, YouTuber	North Team	South Team	Base Camp	7th voted out Day 18		11th Day 18
Thomas Berge; 29, Singer	North Team	North Team	Base Camp	8th voted out Day 21		10th Day 21
Fien Vermeulen; 27, Radio DJ & News Anchor	South Team	South Team	Base Camp	9th voted out Day 24		9th Day 24
Tim Coronel; 47, Racing Driver	North Team	South Team	Base Camp	10th voted out Day 26		8th Day 26
Yvette Broch; 28, Retired Handball Player & Model	South Team	South Team	Base Camp	11th voted out Day 28		7th Day 28
Akwasi Owusu Ansah; 31, Rapper	South Team	South Team	Base Camp	12th voted out Day 30		6th Day 30
Mariana Verkerk; 59, Model	North Team	South Team	Base Camp	Lost challenge Day 31		5th Day 31
Eva Koreman; 34, Radio DJ	North Team	North Team	Base Camp	Lost challenge Day 31		4th Day 31
Shary-An Nivillac; 27, Singer	North Team	North Team	Base Camp	2nd runner-up		3rd Day 32
Eva Cleven; 32, TV Presenter	Devil's Island	North Team	Base Camp	Runner-up		2nd Day 33
Hugo Kennis; 33, TV Chef	South Team	North Team	Base Camp	Robinson		1st Day 33

== Future appearances ==
Rob Geus returned to compete in Expeditie Robinson 2021. Mariana Verkerk and Hugo Kennis returned to compete in Expeditie Robinson: All Stars.
