= Een goed stel hersens =

Dutch television series

- Presented by: Carlo Boszhard; Nicolette Kluijver
- Country of origin: Netherlands
- Original language: Dutch
- No. of seasons: 2
- No. of episodes: 14

Original release
- Release: 14 September 2017 – 1 November 2018

Een goed stel hersens (Dutch for A good brain) is a Dutch television series broadcast by RTL 4. In the show, two duos compete against each other in several games which focus on cognitive abilities. Carlo Boszhard and Nicolette Kluijver presented the show.

== Seasons ==
=== Season 1 (2017) ===
The first season consisted of six episodes.

Episode	Date	Teams	Celebrities	
1	14 September 2017	Team 1	Ronald Molendijk	Olcay Gulsen
1	14 September 2017	Team 2	Holly Mae Brood	Jamai Loman
2	21 September 2017	Team 1	Martijn Krabbé	Miljuschka Witzenhausen
2	21 September 2017	Team 2	Dirk Zeelenberg	Suus Zeelenberg
3	28 September 2017	Team 1	Monica Geuze	Kaj Gorgels
3	28 September 2017	Team 2	Ferry Doedens	Kimberly Klaver
4	5 October 2017	Team 1	Irene Moors	Rudolph van Veen
4	5 October 2017	Team 2	Fred van Leer	Glennis Grace
5	12 October 2017	Team 1	Dennis Weening	Evi Hanssen
5	12 October 2017	Team 2	Jaap Reesema	Kim Kötter
6	19 October 2017	Team 1	Dave Roelvink	Anna Nooshin
6	19 October 2017	Team 2	JayJay Boske	Bertie Steur

=== Season 2 (2018) ===
The second season consisted of eight episodes.

Episode	Date	Teams	Celebrities	
1	13 September 2018	Team 1	Patty Brard	Guido Spek
1	13 September 2018	Team 2	Gwen van Poorten	Hugo Kennis
2	20 September 2018	Team 1	Rick Brandsteder	Roosje Kuizinga
2	20 September 2018	Team 2	Andy van der Meijde	Melisa Schaufeli
3	27 September 2018	Team 1	Giel de Winter	Annemieke de Winter
3	27 September 2018	Team 2	Linda Hakeboom	Koen Kardashian
4	4 October 2018	Team 1	Roy Donders	Ryan Donders
4	4 October 2018	Team 2	Frans Duijts	Marloes Duijts
5	11 October 2018	Team 1	Samantha Steenwijk	Daisy
5	11 October 2018	Team 2	Airen Mylene	Taeke Taekema
6	18 October 2018	Team 1	Esmée van Kampen	Gürkan Küçüksentürk
6	18 October 2018	Team 2	Christina Curry	Shenta Ignacio
7	25 October 2018	Team 1	Kjeld Nuis	Jill de Robles
7	25 October 2018	Team 2	Charly Luske	Tanja Jess
8	1 November 2018	Team 1	Kees Tol	Monique Smit
8	1 November 2018	Team 2	Rob Geus	Suzanne Geus
