= Expeditie Robinson 2020 (Belgium vs. Netherlands) =

- Season 21 (Netherlands); Season 2 (Belgium)
- Presented by: Bartel Van Riet and Geraldine Kemper
- No. of days: 32
- No. of castaways: 16
- Winner: Thomas Roobrouck
- Runners-up: Koen Loomans; Elroy Lemmens
- Location: Camarines Sur, Philippines
- No. of episodes: 15

Release
- Original network: VIER; Videoland
- Original release: 23 January – 30 April 2020

Season chronology
- ← Previous; 2018 (Belgium); 2019 (Netherlands) Next → 2021 (Netherlands)

Expeditie Robinson 2020 is the twenty-first season of the Dutch version of the Swedish television series Expedition Robinson as well as the second season of the Belgian version of the show. This season is the first time since 2012 where Belgian and Dutch contestants competed side-by-side as well as the first time since 2009 in which they're all anonymous castaways.

The main twist this season is that the tribes are divided by nationality. However, after a challenge on day one, the contestant that finished last from both countries were sent to be members of the other tribe. Another twist this season is Revenge Island. After a contestant is voted out, they compete in a duel with the next eliminated contestant until one renters the game. The loser of the duel is sent home, eliminated from the game.

== Finishing order ==
| Contestant | Original Tribe | Swapped Tribe | Merged Tribe | Main Game | Revenge Island | Finish |
|---|---|---|---|---|---|---|
| Aisha de Groot; 28, Amsterdam, Netherlands | South Team | | | 1st Voted Out; Day 3 | Lost Duel; Day 7 | 16th Day 7 |
| Liesbet Drobé; 45, Aalst, Belgium | North Team | | | 3rd Voted Out; Day 7 | Lost Duel; Day 9 | 15th Day 9 |
| Dennis Spanhaak; 27, Joure, Netherlands | South Team | South Team | | 4th Voted Out; Day 9 | Lost Duel; Day 11 | 14th Day 11 |
| Eva Schouten; 32, Zwaag, Netherlands | South Team | North Team | | 5th Voted Out; Day 11 | Lost Duel; Day 14 | 13th Day 14 |
| Farah Cuyvers; 26, Barcelona, Spain | North Team | None | | 2nd Voted Out; Day 5 | Lost Duel; Day 14 | 12th Day 14 |
| Nelleke Verkaart; Returned to Game | North Team | South Team | | 6th Voted Out; Day 13 | Won Duel; Day 14 | |
| Natassia Van Kerkvoorde; 28, Antwerp, Belgium | South Team | South Team | | Lost Challenge; Day 14 | | 11th Day 14 |
| Niels Mattheus Katanga; 29, Leuven, Belgium | North Team | South Team | Catanhawan | 7th Voted Out; Day 17 | | 10th Day 17 |
| Nelleke Verkaart; 31, Amsterdam, Netherlands | North Team | South Team | Catanhawan | 8th Voted Out; Day 20 | | 9th Day 20 |
| Herman Roelink; 48, Almelo, Netherlands | South Team | North Team | Catanhawan | 9th Voted Out; Day 23 | | 8th Day 23 |
| Ruth Tuyteleers; 32, Lint, Belgium | North Team | South Team | Catanhawan | 10th Voted Out; Day 25 | | 7th Day 25 |
| Kevin Van Goethem; 38, Kontich, Belgium | North Team | North Team | Catanhawan | Left Competition; Day 27 | | 6th Day 27 |
| Anouk van der Horst; 30, Utrecht, Netherlands | South Team | North Team | Catanhawan | 11th Voted Out; Day 30 | | 5th Day 30 |
| Jorik Benoit; 42, Helmond, Netherlands | South Team | North Team | Catanhawan | Lost Challenge; Day 31 | | 4th Day 31 |
| Elroy Lemmens; 32, Mierlo, Netherlands | South Team | North Team | Catanhawan | Runner-Up; Day 32 | | 2nd Day 32 |
| Koen Loomans; 37, Leopoldsburg, Belgium | North Team | South Team | Catanhawan | Runner-Up; Day 32 | | 2nd Day 32 |
| Thomas Roobrouck; 31, Vichte, Belgium | North Team | North Team | Catanhawan | Robinson; Day 32 | | 1st Day 32 |
