= Expeditie Robinson =

- Created by: Charlie Parsons
- Theme music composer: Hans Zimmer
- Countries of origin: Netherlands; Belgium
- Original language: Dutch
- No. of seasons: 28
- No. of episodes: 192

Production
- Producer: Kanakna Productions
- Production locations: Malaysia (2000–02, 2004–05, 2007–2010, 2012–13, 2022-23); Indonesia (2003); Philippines (2006, 2011, 2014–2020); Panama (2006); Croatia (2021); Tanzania (2022)

Original release
- Network: RTL 5
- Release: September 15, 2000 – present
- Network: VT4
- Release: September 15, 2000 – April 30, 2020

Related
- Survivor

Expeditie Robinson is a reality television program in the Netherlands and Flanders (Belgium) that debuted in 2000 and based on a format first shown by Swedish television in 1997. The format, most notable under the title Survivor, has since then also been produced in many other countries. The name of the show alludes to Robinson Crusoe, a story featuring people marooned by shipwreck.

The fifteenth season in 2013 was the first season without contestants from Belgium, due to lack of television ratings in Belgium. However, the Flemish host Evi Hanssen would continue to co-host the show with Dutch host Dennis Weening. In 2014 Evi was replaced by Nicolette Kluijver. As of 2026, it has been announced that contestants from Belgium are returning.

== Format ==
In most seasons, sixteen contestants are put into a survival situation and compete in a variety of physical challenges. Early in each season, two teams compete, but later the teams are merged and the competitions become individual ("samensmelting"). At the end of each show, one contestant is eliminated by the other teams in a secret "Island Council" ballot.

== Seasons ==
List of Expeditie Robinson seasons
Year	Location	Days	Castaways	Original tribes	Winner	Runner(s)-up	Final vote
2000	Malaysia	47	16	Two tribes of eight, divided into "North Team" and "South Team"	Karin Lindenhovius	Eva Willems	5–3
2001	Malaysia	39	16	Two tribes of eight, divided into "North Team" and "South Team"	Richard Mackowiak	Pascale Mertens	7–0
2002	Malaysia	47	16	Two tribes of eight, divided into "North Team" and "South Team"	Derek Blok	Olivier Glorieux	5–4
2003	Indonesia	47	16	Two tribes; the first with seven men and one woman, and the second with seven women and one man	Jutta Borms	Judge Chambliss	4–4 (Note: Ultimately, it was Jutta Borms from Belgium who won the season over Judge Chambliss from the Netherlands with an initial jury vote of 4-4, which was eventually broken by a public jury vote in which the public voted in favor of making Jutta the winner with 66% of the vote.)
2004	Malaysia	39	18	Two tribes of eight, divided into participants' country of origin, België (Belgium) and Nederlands (Netherlands)	Frank de Meulder	Matthias Verscheure	10–2
2005	Malaysia	47	18	Two tribes of eight and a secret tribe of two, divided into age groups; under 30s, over 40s and 30s	Marnix Allegaert	Emma Van Den Bossche; Marleen Moer	16–9–3
2006	Expeditie Robinson: Battle of the Titans; Philippines	30	17	Two tribes of eight (Note: As the winner of this challenge Ilona van der Laan, along with Veronique De Pryker, who Ilona picked as the person she got along with the least, picked their tribes from the fifteen other contestants. The last person not picked, Björn Lemeirel, was eliminated from the game.)	Ryan van Esch	Jennifer Smit	4–2
2006	Pearl Islands, Panama	48	16	Two tribes of eight, including two returning participants, divided into men from Belgium and women from Netherlands	Olga Urashova (changed the name later in Belarus for Alexandra Pavlova)	Lenny Janssen	—N/a (Note: When it came time to vote for a winner, the public, instead of a jury decided the winner. In the end, it was Olga Urashova who returned from Losers island in the final three, who won the season over Lenny Janssen with a public vote of 52% to Lenny's 48%.)
2007	Malaysia	46	100 (Note: The initial major twist this season was that for the first time in the history of any Survivor franchise worldwide one hundred contestants would take part in a single season.)	Two tribes of 27, divided into "North Team" and "South Team" (Note: The twist, however, didn't last very long as in episode 2 twenty five of the contestants voluntarily left the game, in episode 3 twenty one contestants were eliminated as they were not picked to be on either the North team or the South team.)	Vinncent Arrendell	Willem Hogeveen	4–3
2008	Malaysia	47	16	Two tribes of eight	Yin Oei Sian	Hans Meenhorst	3–3 (Note: At the live finale, 81 contestants from previous seasons had to choose their winner, due to the equal voting by the eliminated contestants.)
2009	Malaysia	47	21	Two tribes of eight women and a secret tribe with five men who needed to race through the jungle (in a certain time) to join te game	Marcel Vandezande	Rita Berger; Marina Harvent	5–2–0
2010	Malaysia	28	17	Two tribes of eight celebrities and a celebrity coming from "Geheim Kamp"	Regina Romeijn	Tatiana Silva	4–2
2011	Philippines	32	16	Two tribes of eight celebrities	Tanja Dexters	Niko Van Driessche; Sascha Visser	N/A (Note: Instead of a jury vote, a final challenge was held to determine the winner.)
2012	Malaysia	32	16	Two tribes of eight celebrities	Fatima Moreira de Melo	Fajah Lourens; Christophe De Meulder; Peggy Vrijens	N/A
2013	Malaysia	32	16	Two tribes of seven celebrities and an isolated tribe of two celebrities containing the oldest male and oldest female contestant	Edith Bosch	Anna-Alicia Sklias; Geraldine Kemper	N/A
2014	Caramoan, Philippines	32	18	Three tribes of six celebrities	Kay Nambiar	Ferry Doedens; Krystl Pullens	N/A
2015	Caramoan, Philippines	32	17	One tribe of seventeen celebrities, with one player outed to another island with uneven number of players. The rest of the players divided themselves into two teams each episode.	Amara Onwuka	Anna Speller; Oscar Aerts	N/A
2016	Caramoan, Philippines	32	16	Two tribes of eight celebrities divided into "North Team" and "South Team" and lived on the same island	Bertie Steur	Thomas Dekker; Diorno "Dio" Braaf	N/A
2017	Caramoan, Philippines	32	19	Two tribes of seven celebrities and a tribe consisting of four Dutch players and a celebrity	Carlos Platier Luna	Kaj Gorgels; Soundos El Ahmadi	N/A
2018	Caramoan, Philippines	32	21	Two tribes of seven celebrities and a tribe of seven Dutch players	Jan Bronninkreef	Gregory Sedoc; Dominique Hazeleger	N/A
2019	Caramoan, Philippines	33	20	Two tribes of eight celebrities and an isolated tribe of four celebrities	Hugo Kennis	Shary-An Nivillac; Eva Cleven	N/A
2020	Expeditie Robinson: Belgium vs. Netherlands; Caramoan, Philippines	32	16	Two tribes divided by country of origin. Two contestants swapped tribes after losing initial challenge.	Thomas Roobrouck	Elroy Lemmens; Koen Loomans	N/A
2021	Dugi Otok, Croatia	34	26	Two tribes of eight new celebrities, two isolated new celebrities and one tribe of eight returning celebrities.	Robbert Rodenburg	Anouk Maas; Britte Lagcher; Dominique "Do" van Hulst	N/A
2022	Expeditie Robinson: All Stars; Zanzibar, Tanzania	19	16	Two tribes of seven former (semi)finalists, plus two former (semi)finalists who were eliminated before the tribe formation.	Niels Gomperts	Dominique Hazeleger; Ferry Doedens	N/A
2022	Langkawi, Malaysia	35	21	Three tribes of seven celebrities	Dennis Wilt	Ferry Weertman; London Loy	N/A
2023	Langkawi, Malaysia	35	20	Two tribes of ten. One contestant from each tribe eliminated by two tribemates at the end of the first day.	Willem Voogd	Guido Spek; Ilse Paulis	N/A
2024	Johor, Malaysia	35	20	Two tribes of ten. One contestant from each tribe eliminated by two tribemates at the end of the second day.	Kiran Badloe	Marijn Kuipers; Timor Steffens	N/A
2025	Johor, Malaysia	34	20	Four tribes of five. Each tribe picked by one of four winners of the reward challenge.	Camiel Kesbeke	Amijé Roos van der Laan; Lies Zhara	N/A
2026	Johor, Malaysia	34	19	TBA			N/A
