= Expeditie Robinson: All Stars =

- Season 23
- Presented by: Geraldine Kemper; Art Rooijakkers
- No. of days: 19
- No. of castaways: 16
- Winner: Niels Gomperts
- Runners-up: Dominique Hazeleger; Ferry Doedens
- Location: Zanzibar, Tanzania
- No. of episodes: 11

Release
- Original network: RTL 4 Videoland
- Original release: 24 February – 5 May 2022

Season chronology
- ← Previous; 2021 Next → 2022

Expeditie Robinson: All Stars is the twenty-third season of the Dutch reality television series Expeditie Robinson. The season was filmed in Zanzibar, Tanzania and consists of 16 former contestants who've reached the semi-finals of their respective seasons return to compete for another shot of winning the title of Robinson and a prize of €25,000. The season was initially supposed to premiere on 10 March 2022 on Videoland but due to the controversies surrounding The Voice of Holland, the premiere date was pushed up and premiered on 24 February 2022 and now aired on RTL 4. Videoland however, will still air new episodes a week ahead of when it is broadcast on RTL 4.

== Contestants ==
Contestant	Original Tribe	Swapped Tribe	Merged Tribe	Finish
Kay Nambiar; 38, Singer & TV Presenter; 2014	None (Note: Kay and Gregory lost the challenge to join the game. As a result, they did not join a tribe.)			Lost challenge Day 1
Gregory Sedoc; 40, Former Hurdler; 2018	None			Lost challenge Day 1
Krystl Pullens; 38, Singer; 2014	North Team			1st voted out Day 3
Diorno "Dio" Braaf; 33, Rapper; 2016	South Team			2nd voted out Day 5
Hugo Kennis; 35, TV Chef; 2019	South Team	South Team		3rd voted out Day 7
Jan Bronninkreef; 56, Holten; 2018	North Team	North Team		4th voted out Day 9
Bertie Steur; 47, Renesse; 2016	North Team	North Team		Lost challenge Day 11
Carlos Platier Luna; 27, Zwolle; 2017	North Team	South Team	Pungume	5th voted out Day 12
Thomas Dekker; 37, Former Cyclist; 2016	North Team	North Team	Pungume	6th voted out Day 14
Rita Berger; 44, Breda; 2009	North Team	South Team	Pungume	7th voted out Day 15
Edith Bosch; 41, Former Judoka; 2013	North Team	South Team	Pungume	8th voted out Day 17
Mariana Verkerk; 61, Model; 2019	South Team	North Team	Pungume	Lost challenge Day 18
Sebastiaan Labrie; 50, Actor & TV Presenter; 2010	South Team	South Team	Pungume	Lost challenge Day 18
Dominique Hazeleger; 25, Horst; 2018	South Team	South Team	Pungume	Runner-Up; Day 19
Ferry Doedens; 31, Actor; 2014	South Team	North Team	Pungume	Runner-Up; Day 19
Niels Gomperts; 30, Actor; 2017	South Team	North Team	Pungume	Ultimate Robinson; Day 19

== Challenges ==
Episode	Air date (Note: Air dates corresponds to when aired on RTL 4. Episodes air a week earlier on Videoland.)	Challenges		Eliminated	Vote	Finish
Episode	Air date	Reward	Immunity	Eliminated	Vote	Finish
Episode 1	24 February 2022 (RTL 4 & Videoland)	South Team	None (Note: No Immunity Challenge was held in Episode 1.)	Kay	None	Lost challenge Day 1
Episode 1	24 February 2022 (RTL 4 & Videoland)	South Team	None	Gregory	None	Lost challenge Day 1
Episode 2	3 March 2022 (RTL 4); 24 February 2022 (Videoland)	None	South Team	Krystl	5–2	1st voted out Day 3
Episode 3	10 March 2022 (RTL 4); 3 March 2022 (Videoland)	None	North Team	Dio	6–1	2nd voted out Day 5
Episode 4	17 March 2022 (RTL 4); 10 March 2022 (Videoland)	None	North Team	Hugo	3–3	3rd voted out Day 7
Episode 5	24 March 2022 (RTL 4); 17 March 2022 (Videoland)	None	South Team	Jan	4–2	4th voted out Day 9
Episode 6	31 March 2022 (RTL 4); 24 March 2022 (Videoland)	Niels, [Sebastiaan, Rita]		Bertie	None	Lost challenge Day 11
Episode 6	31 March 2022 (RTL 4); 24 March 2022 (Videoland)	Niels, [Sebastiaan, Rita]		Carlos	16–12–3	5th voted out Day 12
Episode 7	7 April 2022 (RTL 4); 31 March 2022 (Videoland)	Niels, [Dominique, Thomas]		Thomas	5–2–1	6th voted out Day 14
Episode 8	14 April 2022 (RTL 4); 7 April 2022 (Videoland)	Niels, [Ferry, Mariana]		Rita	4–3	7th voted out Day 15
Episode 9	21 April 2022 (RTL 4); 14 April 2022 (Videoland)	Dominique, [Sebastiaan, Edith]		Edith	8–2	8th voted out Day 17
Episode 10	28 April 2022 (RTL 4); 21 April 2022 (Videoland)	Niels		None	None	None
Episode 10	28 April 2022 (RTL 4); 21 April 2022 (Videoland)	Ferry		Mariana	None	Lost challenge Day 18
Episode 10	28 April 2022 (RTL 4); 21 April 2022 (Videoland)	Ferry		Sebastiaan	None	Lost challenge Day 18
Episode 11	5 May 2022 (RTL 4); 28 April 2022 (Videoland)	None		Dominique	None	Runner-Up
Episode 11	5 May 2022 (RTL 4); 28 April 2022 (Videoland)	None		Ferry	None	Runner-Up
Episode 11	5 May 2022 (RTL 4); 28 April 2022 (Videoland)	None		Niels	None	Ultimate Robinson

== Voting history ==
#	No Tribes		Original Tribes		Swapped Tribes				Merged Tribe								
Episode	1		2	3	4		5	6		7	8	9	10		11		
Day	1		3	5	7		9	11	12	14	15	17	18		19		
Voted out	Kay	Gregory	Krystl	Dio	Tie	Hugo	Jan	Bertie	Carlos	Thomas	Rita	Edith	Sebastiaan	Mariana	Ferry	Dominique	Niels
Votes	Challenge		5–2	6–1	3–3	Challenge	4–2	Challenge	16–12–3	5–2–1	4–3	8–2	Challenge		Challenge		
Voter	Votes																
Niels	Won			Dio			Jan	Won				Edith (6x)	Won		Ultimate Robinson		
Dominique	Safe			Dio	Carlos			Safe	Carlos (3x)	Edith	Rita				Runner-Up		
Ferry	Safe			Dio			Jan	Safe	Carlos (4x)	Thomas	Rita		Won		Runner-Up		
Mariana	Safe			Dio			Jan	Safe	Carlos (3x)	Thomas	Rita	Edith	Lost				
Sebastiaan	Safe			Dio	Carlos			Safe	Carlos (3x)	Thomas (2x)	Rita	Edith	Lost				
Edith	Safe		Krystl		Hugo			Safe	Dominique (6x)			Ferry					
Rita	Safe		Krystl		Hugo			Safe	Sebastiaan (3x)	Thomas	Mariana (2x)						
Thomas	Safe		Rita				Jan	Safe	Carlos (3x)	Edith							
Carlos	Safe		Krystl		Hugo	Won		Safe	Dominique (6x)								
Bertie	Won		Krystl				Thomas	Lost									
Jan	Safe		Krystl				Thomas										
Hugo	Safe			Dio	Carlos	Lost											
Dio	Safe			Ferry													
Krystl	Safe		Rita														
Gregory	Lost																
Kay	Lost																
Black Vote										Ferry	Mariana	Ferry					
