= Expeditie Robinson 2014 =

- Season 16
- No. of episodes: 16

Release
- Original network: RTL 5
- Original release: September 4 – December 18, 2014

Season chronology
- ← Previous; 2013 Next → 2015

Expeditie Robinson 2014 is the sixteenth season of the RTL 5 reality television series Expeditie Robinson first aired on September 4, 2014. It's the first season hosted by Nicolette Kluijver and the third season hosted by Dennis Weening.

== Survivors ==
Contestants	Episodes															Finish	Total votes
Contestants	01	02	03	04	05	06	07	08	09	10	11	12	13	14	15	Finish	Total votes
Kay Nambiar; 31, singer/model																Winner	2
Ferry Doedens; 24, actor and erotic model																Runner-Up	3
Krystl Pullens; 31, singer																Runner-Up	2
Freddy Tratlehner; 31, rapper																Removed; 4th	3
Lobke Berkhout; 33, sailor																Voted Out 8th 5th	22
Rick Brandsteder; 30, host																Voted Out 7th 6th	8
Dominik Włodzimierz; 24, rapper																Voted Out 6th 7th	11
Sabrina Starke; 34, singer																Quit voluntarily 8th	6
Manuel Broekman; 27, actor																Voted Out 5th 9th	10
Remy Bonjasky; 38, boxer																Voted Out 4th 10th	6
Anouk Maas; 28, actor																Eliminated; 11th	0
Loek Peters; 40, actor																Quit voluntarily 12th	3
Nadia Poeschmann; 33, host																Eliminated; 13th	8
Leo Alkemade; 33, actor																Quit voluntarily 14th	6
Lone van Roosendaal; 45, actor																Voted Out 3rd 15th	4
Juliette van Ardenne; 30, actor																Voted Out 2nd 16th	5
Ancilla Tilia; 29, host																Voted Out 1st 17th	10
Coosje Smid; 24, singer																Removed; 18th	0

Kamp Blauw
Kamp Geel
Kamp Rood
Hel
Basis Kamp
Winnaarseiland

== Future appearances ==
Loek Peters and Anouk Maas returned to compete in Expeditie Robinson 2021. Krystl Pullens, Ferry Doedens and Kay Nambiar returned to compete in Expeditie Robinson: All Stars.
