= Harry Piekema =

Dutch actor and voice actor

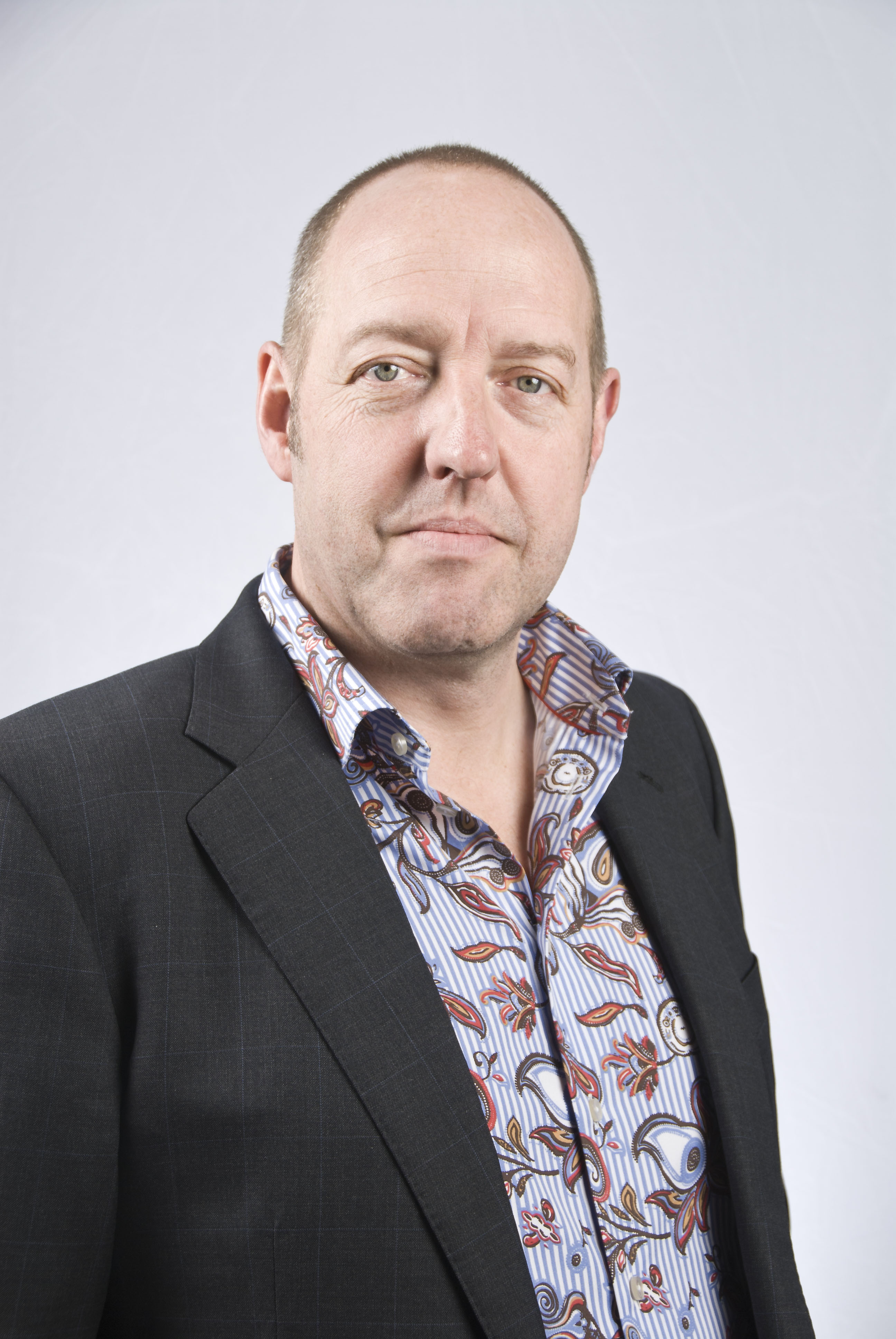
- Born: Harry Piekema; 23 May 1959 (age 66); The Hague, Netherlands
- Occupations: Actor; voice actor; director; clown
- Years active: 1981–present

Harry Piekema (born 23 May 1959 in The Hague) is a Dutch actor, director and voice actor. His most famous role was as Van Dalen in the commercials of Dutch supermarket chain Albert Heijn. He played this role from 2004 until 2015.

== Career ==
=== 2004 - 2015: Van Dalen and other roles ===
Piekema played the Supermarket manager Van Dalen between 2004 and 2015. This role was well received and earned him an oeuvre award during the Gouden Loeki awards, the biggest award for commercials in the Netherlands. His final commercial in januari 2015 also received the Gouden Loeki of 2015.

In 2013, Piekema provided his voice as the main narrator of De Nieuwe Wildernis.

=== 2015 - Present: Later career ===
In 2016, Piekema would get roles in Fataal and the television series Caps Club. In 2017, Piekema debuted as Hoofdpiet in Sinterklaasjournaal. In 2019, Piekema reached the quarter-finals in It Takes 2.

In 2020, Piekema temporarily took over the presentation of Lachen om Home Video's. Since 2021, Piekema has returned to playing in commercials, taking the role of Handige Harry in the commerciels of phone provider 50+ Mobiel. In 2022, Piekema participated in season 22 of the Dutch survival show Expeditie Robinson.
