= Verkerk =

Verkerk is a Dutch toponymic surname. The name is a contraction of van der Kerk, meaning "from (near) the church". Notable people with the surname include:

- Kees Verkerk (born 1942), Dutch speed skater
- Marhinde Verkerk (born 1985), Dutch judoka
- Mariana Verkerk (born 1960), Dutch model, agent, and television personality
- Martin Verkerk (born 1978), Dutch tennis player
- Rob Verkerk (born 1960), Commander of the Royal Netherlands Navy 2014–2017
