= Expeditie Robinson 2022 =

- Season 24
- Presented by: Nicolette Kluijver; Rick Brandsteder
- No. of days: 35
- No. of castaways: 21
- Winner: Dennis Wilt
- Runners-up: Ferry Weertman; London Loy
- Location: Langkawi, Malaysia
- No. of episodes: 17

Release
- Original network: RTL 4
- Original release: 29 August – 19 December 2022

Season chronology
- ← Previous; All Stars Next → 2023

Expeditie Robinson 2022 is the twenty-fourth season of the Dutch reality television series Expeditie Robinson. The season is filmed in Malaysia where 21 Dutch celebrities compete in tribes against each other for food, shelter and immunity and to avoid being voted off. Nicolette Kluijver returns to host alongside new co-host Rick Brandsteder. The season premiered on 29 August 2022 on RTL 4.

== Contestants ==
List of Expeditie Robinson 2022 contestants
Contestant	Original Tribe	Swapped Tribe	Merged Tribe	Main Game	Losers' Island	Finish
Marion Pauw; 48, Author	Purple Team			1st voted out Day 4		21st Day 4
Susan Radder; 23, Actress	Green Team			2nd voted out Day 7		20th Day 7
Kirsten Westrik; 37, TV Presenter	Green Team			3rd voted out Day 10		19th Day 10
Laura Vlasblom; 53, Singer	Orange Team	Orange Team		4th voted out Day 12		18th Day 12
Liza Sips; 31, Actress & Model	Orange Team	Orange Team		5th voted out Day 14		17th Day 14
Juultje Tieleman; 22, YouTuber	Purple Team	Purple Team		Quit; Day 16		16th Day 16
Rose Bertram; 27, Model & Businesswoman	Purple Team	Green Team		6th voted out Day 16		15th Day 16
Devrim Aslan; 26, Quizzer	Orange Team	Purple Team		7th voted out Day 19		14th Day 19
Iliass Ojja; 34, Actor	Purple Team	Purple Team		Quit; Day 20		13th Day 20
Chatilla van Grinsven; 31, Former Basketball Player	Green Team	Orange Team	Chawi	8th voted out Day 23	Lost duel Day 25	12th Day 25
Mike Weerts; 40, Actor	Orange Team	Green Team		Lost Duel; Day 21	Quit; Day 25	11th Day 25
Niels Oosthoek; 31, YouTuber	Purple Team	Purple Team	Chawi	10th voted out Day 27	Refused offer Day 27	10th Day 27
Thijs Boermans; 25, Actor	Purple Team	Green Team	Chawi	11th voted out Day 29	Lost duel Day 31	9th Day 31
Vincent Vianen; 38, Dancer	Green Team	Orange Team	Chawi	9th voted out Day 25	Lost duel Day 33	8th Day 33
Harry Piekema; 63, Actor	Green Team	Orange Team	Chawi	13th voted out Day 33	Lost duel Day 33	7th Day 33
Dzifa Kusenuh; Returned to game	Purple Team	Green Team	Chawi	12th voted out Day 31	Returnee; Day 33	
Dzifa Kusenuh; 27, Actress	Purple Team	Green Team	Chawi	Lost challenge Day 34		6th Day 34
April Darby; 31, Singer	Orange Team	Purple Team	Chawi	Lost challenge Day 34		5th Day 34
Niek Roozen; 24, Actor	Green Team	Green Team	Chawi	Lost challenge Day 34		4th Day 34
Ferry Weertman; 30, Former Competitive Swimmer	Orange Team	Purple Team	Chawi	Runner-Up; Day 35		2nd Day 35
London Loy; 47, TV Chef	Green Team	Green Team	Chawi	Runner-Up; Day 35		2nd Day 35
Dennis Wilt; 52, Meteorologist	Orange Team	Orange Team	Chawi	Robinson; Day 35		1st Day 35

== Season summary ==
Expeditie Robinson 2023 summary
Episode		Challenge winner(s)				Voted out		
No.	Air date	Reward			Immunity	Team	Player	Day
1	August 29, 2022	London (Green Team)	Iliass (Purple Team)	Liza (Orange Team)	None	None (Note: Tribal Council occurred in the next episode.)		
1	August 29, 2022	Green Team			None	None		
2	September 5, 2022	Orange Team				Purple Team	Marion	Day 4
2	September 5, 2022				Green Team	Purple Team	Marion	Day 4
3	September 12, 2022	Purple Team				Green Team	Susan	Day 7
3	September 12, 2022				Ora2nge Team	Green Team	Susan	Day 7
4	September 19, 2022	Purple Team				Green Team	Kirsten	Day 10
4	September 19, 2022				Orange Team	Green Team	Kirsten	Day 10
5	September 26, 2022	Green Team				Orange Team	Laura	Day 12
5	September 26, 2022				Purple Team	Orange Team	Laura	Day 12
6	October 3, 2022	Green Team				Orange Team	Liza	Day 14
6	October 3, 2022				Purple Team	Orange Team	Liza	Day 14
7	October 10, 2022	Purple Team				Purple Team	Juultje (Note: Quit on Day 16.)	Day 16
7	October 10, 2022				Orange Team	Green Team	Rose	Day 16
8	October 17, 2022	Orange Team				Purple Team	Devrim	Day 19
8	October 17, 2022				Green Team	Purple Team	Devrim	Day 19
9	October 24, 2022	Orange Team				Purple Team	Iliass	Day 20
9	October 24, 2022				Ferry	None	Mike	Day 21
10	October 31, 2022	April [Vincent, Dzifa]				Chawi	Chatilla	Day 23
11	November 7, 2022	Niels [Thijs, London]				Chawi	Vincent	Day 25
12	November 14, 2022	Dennis [Harry, Ferry]				Chawi	Niels	Day 27
13	November 21, 2022	April [Niek, Ferry]				Chawi	Thijs	Day 29
14	November 28, 2022	Ferry [Dennis, London]				Chawi	Dzifa (Note: Returned on Day 33.)	Day 31
15	December 5, 2022	Ferry [April]				Chawi	Harry	Day 33
16	December 12, 2022	Ferry				Chawi	Dzifa	Day 34
16	December 12, 2022	London				Chawi	April	Day 34
16	December 12, 2022				Dennis	Chawi	Niek	Day 34
17	December 19, 2022	Dennis				Chawi	Ferry	Day 35
17	December 19, 2022	Dennis				Chawi	London	Day 35

== Voting history ==
	Original team			Switched team							No team	Merged team												
Episode	2	3	4	5	6		7		8	9		10	11		12	13	14	15	16			17		
Day	4	7	10	12	14		16		19	20	21	23	25		27	29	31	33	34			35		
Team	Purple	Green	Green	Orange	Orange		Purple	Green	Purple	Purple	None	Chawi	Chawi		Chawi	Chawi	Chawi	Chawi	Chawi			Chawi		
Voted out	Marion	Susan	Kirsten	Laura	Liza		Juultje	Rose	Devrim	Iliass	Mike	Chatilla	Vincent		Niels	Thijs	Dzifa	Harry	Dzifa	April	Niek	London	Ferry	Dennis
Votes	6–1	4–2–1	5–1	5–1	4–2		Quit	4–2	3–2	Quit	Challenge	7–4–1	7–4–1–1		6–3–1	6–2–1	6–2	4–2–1	Challenge	Challenge	Challenge	Challenge		
Voter	Vote										Challenge	Vote							Challenge					
Dennis				Laura	Liza							Niek	Niek		London	Thijs	Dzifa	Niek	Safe	Safe	Won	Won		
Ferry									Devrim		Won	Chatilla	Vincent		Niels	Thijs	Dzifa	Harry	Won	Immune		Lost		
London		Susan	Kirsten					Rose			Safe	Chatilla	Niek		Niels	Thijs	Dzifa	Harry	Safe	Won	Immune	Lost		
Niek		Kirsten	Kirsten					Rose			Safe	Chatilla	Vincent	Vincent	Niels	Thijs	Dzifa	Harry	Safe	Safe	Lost			
April									Devrim		Safe	Chatilla	Thijs		Niels	Thijs	Dzifa	Harry	Safe	Lost				
Dzifa	Marion							Mike			Safe	Chatilla	Vincent	Vincent	Niels	Ferry	Niek		Lost					
Harry		Susan	Kirsten	Laura	Liza							Niek	Niek		London	Thijs	Dzifa	London						
Thijs	Marion							Rose			Safe	Chatilla	Vincent		Niels	Ferry								
Niels	Marion								Devrim		Safe	Chatilla	Vincent		Niek									
Vincent		Susan	Kirsten	Laura	Liza							Niek	Niek											
Chatilla		Susan	Kirsten	Laura	Liza							Niek												
Mike								Rose			Lost													
Iliass	Marion								Ferry															
Devrim									Ferry															
Rose	Marion							Mike																
Juultje	Marion																							
Liza				Laura	Harry	Harry																		
Laura				Harry																				
Kirsten		Harry	Harry																					
Susan		Harry																						
Marion	Rose																							
Black vote												Harry	Harry		London	Harry	Niek	London						
