= Expeditie Robinson 2021 =

- Season 22
- Presented by: Kaj Gorgels & Nicolette Kluijver
- No. of days: 34
- No. of castaways: 26
- Winner: Robbert Rodenburg
- Runners-up: Britte Lagcher; Anouk Maas; Dominique "Do" van Hulst
- Location: Dugi Otok, Croatia
- No. of episodes: 33

Release
- Original network: RTL 4
- Original release: 29 August – 19 December 2021

Season chronology
- ← Previous; 2020 Next → All Stars

Expeditie Robinson 2021 is the twenty-second season of the Dutch reality television series Expeditie Robinson. Due to the COVID-19 pandemic, the season changed filming locations and filmed in Dugi Otok, Croatia. As with the previous seasons since 2010 (with the exception of the previous season), famous Dutch celebrities will be competing in teams to survive against each other and elimination. The main twist this season is 8 former contestants return to compete for a spot to join the 18 new contestants for a chance at redemption and to win the game. This season is the first season to air two times a week with the premiere occurring 29 August 2021 on RTL 4.

== Contestants ==
Starting on 9 August 2021, contestants were announced via different ways, on different moments, via different challenges, with a total of 18 being announced before the season started airing. Then, at the end of episode 1, it was revealed that eight more contestants would be participating in a separate expedition. These 8 were returning players, who then were revealed all together via the Expeditie Robinson instagram page right after episode 1 finished airing. For the first time every, two separate expeditions were being played, also after the merge. This caused that 19 out of 26 players made the merge. Eventually the final 7 were reunited into one tribe on day 31.

List of Expeditie Robinson 2021 contestants
| Contestant | Original Tribe | Post 2nd Chance | Swapped Tribe | Merged Tribe (with Vela Luka) | Merged Tribe (post Vela Luka) | Voted Out | Afvallerseiland | Finish |
|---|---|---|---|---|---|---|---|---|
| Dennis Schouten; 25, Reporter & YouTuber | North Team | | | | | Left competition Day 2 | | 26th Day 2 |
| John de Bever; Returned to the game | None | | | | | Lost challenge Day 1 | Won challenge Day 3 | |
| Sieneke Baum-Peeters; Returned to the game | South Team | | | | | 1st voted out Day 4 | | |
| Stefano Keizers; Returned to the game | North Team | North Team | | | | 3rd voted out Day 6 | | |
| Eva van de Wijdeven; 36, Actress | None | None | | | | Lost challenge Day 1 | Lost challenge Day 8 | 25th Day 8 |
| Sterrin Smalbrugge; Returned to the game | North Team | North Team | | | | 5th voted out Day 8 | | |
| Stefano Keizers; 33, Comedian | North Team | 2nd Chance Island | | | | 6th voted out Day 8 | Lost challenge Day 9 | 24th Day 9 |
| Sieneke Baum-Peeters; 29, Singer | South Team | 2nd Chance Island | 2nd Chance Island | | | 8th voted out Day 10 | Lost challenge Day 12 | 23rd Day 12 |
| Jasper Demollin; 30, Presenter, YouTuber & Actor | South Team | South Team | North Team | | | 9th voted out Day 12 | Lost challenge Day 13 | 22nd Day 13 |
| Saar Koningsberger; 34, VJ & TV Presenter; 2010 | 2nd Chance Island | 2nd Chance Island | 2nd Chance Island | | | 12th voted out Day 14 | Lost challenge Day 16 | 21st Day 16 |
| John de Bever; 56, Singer & Former Footballer | None | 2nd Chance Island | None | | | 2nd voted out Day 4 | Lost challenge Day 17 | 20th Day 17 |
| Rob Geus; Returned to the game | 2nd Chance Island | 2nd Chance Island | None | | | 4th voted out Day 6 | Returnee; Day 17 | |
| Jasmine Sendar; Returned to the game | South Team | South Team | South Team | | | 7th voted out Day 10 | Returnee; Day 17 | |
| Anouk Maas; Returned to the game | 2nd Chance Island | 2nd Chance Island | 2nd Chance Island | | | 10th voted out Day 12 | Returnee; Day 17 | |
| Annemiek Koekoek; Returned to the game | North Team | North Team | North Team | | | 11th voted out Day 14 | Returnee; Day 17 | |
| Yuki Kempees; Returned to the game | North Team | North Team | South Team | | | 13th voted out Day 16 | Returnee; Day 17 | |
| Sterrin Smalbrugge; Returned to the game | North Team | 2nd Chance Island | 2nd Chance Island | | | 14th voted out Day 16 | Returnee; Day 17 | |
| Loiza Lamers; 26, Model & Businesswoman; 2018 | 2nd Chance Island | 2nd Chance Island | 2nd Chance Island | Trata | | Medically evacuated Day 18 | | 19th Day 18 |
| Dyantha Brooks; 32, Presenter | South Team | South Team | South Team | Vela Luka | | 15th voted out Day 19 | | 18th Day 19 |
| Défano Holwijn; 28, YouTuber & Rapper | South Team | South Team | North Team | Trata | | Left competition Day 21 | | 17th Day 21 |
| Loek Peters; 46, Actor; 2014 | 2nd Chance Island | 2nd Chance Island | 2nd Chance Island | Trata | | 16th voted out Day 22 | | 16th Day 22 |
| Sylvana IJsselmuiden; 26, Presenter, YouTuber & Fashion Model | North Team | North Team | North Team | Vela Luka | | 17th voted out Day 22 | | 15th Day 22 |
| Wietze de Jager; 32, Radio DJ; 2015 | 2nd Chance Island | 2nd Chance Island | 2nd Chance Island | Trata | | Left competition Day 23 | | 14th Day 23 |
| Jan van Halst; 52, Former Footballer | South Team | South Team | North Team | Trata | | 18th voted out Day 24 | | 13th Day 24 |
| Rob Geus; 49, TV Presenter; 2019 | 2nd Chance Island | 2nd Chance Island | None | Vela Luka | | 19th voted out Day 24 | | 12th Day 24 |
| René van Meurs; 35, Comedian | North Team | North Team | South Team | Trata | | 20th voted out Day 26 | | 11th Day 26 |
| Sterrin Smalbrugge; 28, Ecologist & Herpetologist | North Team | 2nd Chance Island | 2nd Chance Island | Vela Luka | | 21st voted out Day 26 | | 10th Day 26 |
| Jasmine Sendar; 43, Actress & Singer | South Team | South Team | South Team | Trata | | 22nd voted out Day 29 | | 9th Day 29 |
| Annemiek Koekoek; 27, Farmer & Reality TV Star | North Team | North Team | North Team | Vela Luka | | 23rd voted out Day 29 | | 8th Day 29 |
| Sandra Ysbrandy; 52, TV Chef | North Team | North Team | North Team | Vela Luka | Trata | 24th voted out Day 31 | | 7th Day 31 |
| Yuki Kempees; 34, DJ | North Team | North Team | South Team | Trata | Trata | Lost challenge Day 33 | | 6th Day 33 |
| JayJay Boske; 35, Presenter & Former Rugby Player; 2016 | 2nd Chance Island | 2nd Chance Island | 2nd Chance Island | Vela Luka | Trata | Lost challenge Day 33 | | 5th Day 33 |
| Dominique "Do" van Hulst; 39, Singer; 2011 | 2nd Chance Island | 2nd Chance Island | 2nd Chance Island | Vela Luka | Trata | 3rd Runner-Up; Day 34 | | 4th Day 34 |
| Anouk Maas; 34, Actress; 2014 | 2nd Chance Island | 2nd Chance Island | 2nd Chance Island | Trata | Trata | Runner-Up; Day 34 | | 2nd / 3rd Day 34 |
| Britte Lagcher; 31, Actress | South Team | South Team | South Team | Trata | Trata | Runner-Up; Day 34 | | 2nd / 3rd Day 34 |
| Robbert Rodenburg; 23, YouTuber & Actor | South Team | South Team | South Team | Vela Luka | Trata | Robinson; Day 34 | | 1st Day 34 |

== Season summary ==
| Episode | Air date | Challenges | | Eliminated | Vote | Finish |
| Episode | Air date | Reward | Immunity | Eliminated | Vote | Finish |
|---|---|---|---|---|---|---|
| Episode 1 | 29 August 2021 | René & Sylvana | | Eva | None | Lost challenge Day 1 |
| Episode 1 | 29 August 2021 | Britte & Jasper | | John | None | Lost challenge Day 1 |
| Episode 2 | 2 September 2021 | Saar | Do | None | (Note: At the end of the episode, no one from 2nd Chance Island was voted off.) | |
| Episode 3 | 5 September 2021 | None | North Team | Dennis | None | Left competition Day 2 |
| Episode 3 | 5 September 2021 | None | North Team | Sieneke | 7–1 | 1st voted out Day 4 |
| Episode 4 | 9 September 2021 | None | JayJay | John | 8–2 | 2nd voted out Day 4 |
| Episode 5 | 12 September 2021 | None | South Team | Stefano | 6–1 | 3rd voted out Day 6 |
| Episode 6 | 16 September 2021 | None | Saar | Rob | 8–1 | 4th voted out Day 6 |
| Episode 7 | 19 September 2021 | South Team | | Sterrin | 4–2 | 5th voted out Day 8 |
| Episode 8 | 23 September 2021 | None | JayJay | Stefano | 8–1 | 6th voted out Day 8 |
| Episode 9 | 26 September 2021 | None | North Team | Jasmine | 4–2 | 7th voted out Day 10 |
| Episode 10 | 30 September 2021 | None | JayJay, Loek, Sterrin, Wietze | Sieneke | 4–1 | 8th voted out Day 10 |
| Episode 11 | 3 October 2021 | South Team | | Jasper | 4–2 | 9th voted out Day 12 |
| Episode 12 | 7 October 2021 | JayJay | JayJay, Loek, Sterrin, Wietze | Anouk | 3–1 | 10th voted out Day 12 |
| Episode 13 | 10 October 2021 | None | South Team | Annemiek | 4–1 | 11th voted out Day 14 |
| Episode 14 | 14 October 2021 | None | Loek | Saar | 4–3–1 | 12th voted out Day 14 |
| Episode 15 | 17 October 2021 | None | North Team | Yuki | 4–0 | 13th voted out Day 16 |
| Episode 16 | 21 October 2021 | None | Wietze | Sterrin | 5–1 | 14th voted out Day 16 |
| Episode 17 | 24 October 2021 | Yuki | Jan | None | | |
| Episode 18 | 28 October 2021 | None | Yuki | None | | |
| Episode 19 | 31 October 2021 | None | Britte | Loiza | None | Medically evacuated Day 18 |
| Episode 20 | 4 November 2021 | None | Do | Dyantha | 7–1–1 | 15th voted out Day 19 |
| Episode 21 | 7 November 2021 | None | Jasmine | Défano | None | Left competition Day 21 |
| Episode 21 | 7 November 2021 | None | Jasmine | Loek | 4–2 | 16th voted out Day 22 |
| Episode 22 | 11 November 2021 | Sandra | | Sylvana | 9–5 | 17th voted out Day 22 |
| Episode 23 | 14 November 2021 | None | Yuki | Wietze | None | Left competition Day 23 |
| Episode 23 | 14 November 2021 | None | Yuki | Jan | 5–2–2–1 | 18th voted out Day 24 |
| Episode 24 | 18 November 2021 | Annemiek | | Rob | 4–3 | 19th voted out Day 24 |
| Episode 25 | 21 November 2021 | Jasmine | | René | 6–1 | 20th voted out Day 26 |
| Episode 26 | 25 November 2021 | None | JayJay | Sterrin | 3–2 | 21st voted out Day 26 |
| Episode 27 | 28 November 2021 | None | Anouk | Jasmine | 4–3 | 22nd voted out Day 29 |
| Episode 28 | 2 December 2021 | Do | | Annemiek | 2–1 | 23rd voted out Day 29 |
| Episode 29 | 5 December 2021 | None | Anouk | None | | |
| Episode 30 | 9 December 2021 | None | JayJay | Sandra | 3–0 | 24th voted out Day 31 |
| Episode 31 | 12 December 2021 | None | Britte | None | | |
| Episode 31 | 12 December 2021 | None | Robbert | None | | |
| Episode 32 | 16 December 2021 | None | Do | Yuki | None | Lost challenge Day 33 |
| Episode 32 | 16 December 2021 | Anouk | | JayJay | None | Lost challenge Day 33 |
| Episode 33 | 19 December 2021 | | | Do | None | Fourth Place |
| Episode 33 | 19 December 2021 | | | Anouk | None | Runner-Up |
| Episode 33 | 19 December 2021 | | | Britte | None | Runner-Up |
| Episode 33 | 19 December 2021 | | | Robbert | None | Robinson |

== Voting history ==
=== Days 1–17 ===
| # | Original Tribe | | | | Post 2nd Chance | | | | | Swapped Tribe | | | | | | | | | |
|---|---|---|---|---|---|---|---|---|---|---|---|---|---|---|---|---|---|---|---|
| Episode | 1 | | 3 | | 4 | 5 | 6 | 7 | 8 | 9 | 10 | 11 | 12 | 13 | 14 | 15 | 16 | 17 | 18 |
| Day | 1 | | 2 | 4 | | 6 | | 8 | | 10 | | 12 | | 14 | | 16 | | 17 | |
| Voted out | Eva | John | Dennis | Sieneke | John | Stefano | Rob | Sterrin | Stefano | Jasmine | Sieneke | Jasper | Anouk | Annemiek | Saar | Yuki | Sterrin | None | None |
| Votes | None | None | None | 7–1 | 8–2 | 6–1 | 8–1 | 4–2 | 8–1 | 4–2 | 4–1 | 4–2 | 3–1 | 4–1 | 4–3–1 | 4–0 | 5–1 | None | None |
| Voter | Vote | | | | | | | | | | | | | | | | | | |
| Robbert | | | | Sieneke | | | | | | Jasmine | | | | | | Yuki | | Lost | |
| Anouk | 2nd Chance Island | | | | John | | Rob | | Stefano | | Sieneke | | Do | | | | | | |
| Britte | | | | Sieneke | | | | | | Jasmine | | | | | | Yuki | | | |
| Do | 2nd Chance Island | | | | John | | Rob | | Stefano | | Sieneke | | Anouk | | Sterrin | | Sterrin | | Lost |
| JayJay | 2nd Chance Island | | | | John | | Rob | | Stefano | | Immune | | Immune | | Saar | | Sterrin | | Lost |
| Yuki | | | | | | Stefano | | Sterrin | | Jasmine | | | | | | ~~René~~ | | | Won |
| Sandra | | | | | | Stefano | | Sterrin | | | | Jasper | | Annemiek | | | | Lost | |
| Annemiek | | | | | | Stefano | | Sylvana | | | | Sylvana | | Sylvana | | | | | Lost |
| Jasmine | | | | Sieneke | | | | | | Yuki | | | | | | | | | |
| Sterrin | | | | | | Stefano | | Sylvana | | | Immune | | Immune | | Saar | | Do | | Lost |
| René | | | | | | Stefano | | Sterrin | | Yuki | | | | | | Yuki | | | |
| Rob | 2nd Chance Island | | | | John | | Sieneke | | | | | | | | | | | | Lost |
| Jan | | | | Sieneke | | | | | | | | Jasper | | Annemiek | | | | Won | |
| Wietze | 2nd Chance Island | | | | John | | Rob | | Stefano | | Immune | | Immune | | Saar | | Sterrin | | |
| Sylvana | | | | | | Stefano | | Sterrin | | | | Jasper | | Annemiek | | | | Lost | |
| Loek | 2nd Chance Island | | | | John | | Rob | | Stefano | | Immune | | Immune | | Saar | | Sterrin | | |
| Défano | | | | Sieneke | | | | | | | | Jasper | | Annemiek | | | | | |
| Dyantha | | | | Sieneke | | | | | | Jasmine | | | | | | Yuki | | Lost | |
| Loiza | 2nd Chance Island | | | | John | | Rob | | Stefano | | Sieneke | | Anouk | | Sterrin | | Sterrin | | |
| Saar | 2nd Chance Island | | | | John | | Rob | | Stefano | | Sieneke | | Anouk | | Sterrin | | | | |
| Jasper | | | | Sieneke | | | | | | | | Sylvana | | | | | | | |
| Sieneke | | | | Jasper | | | Rob | | Stefano | | Do | | | | | | | | |
| Stefano | | | | | | René | | | Sieneke | | | | | | | | | | |
| John | | | | | Rob | | | | | | | | | | | | | | |
| Dennis | | | | | | | | | | | | | | | | | | | |
| Eva | | | | | | | | | | | | | | | | | | | |
| Black Vote | | | | | Rob | | | | | | | | | | Do | | | | |

=== Days 18–34 ===
| # | Merged Tribe | | | | | | | | | | | | Post Vela Luka | | | | | | | |
|---|---|---|---|---|---|---|---|---|---|---|---|---|---|---|---|---|---|---|---|---|
| Episode | 19 | 20 | 21 | | 22 | 23 | | 24 | 25 | 26 | 27 | 28 | 30 | 31 | 32 | | 33 | | | |
| Day | 18 | 19 | 21 | 22 | | 23 | 24 | | 26 | | 29 | | 31 | 32 | 33 | | 34 | | | |
| Voted out | Loiza | Dyantha | Défano | Loek | Sylvana | Wietze | Jan | Rob | René | Sterrin | Jasmine | Annemiek | Sandra | None | Yuki | JayJay | Do | Britte | Anouk | Robbert |
| Votes | None | 7–1–1 | None | 4–2 | 9–5 | None | 5–2–2–1 | 4–3 | 6–1 | 3–2 | 4–3 | 2–1 | 3–0 | None | None | None | None | None | None | None |
| Voter | Vote | | | | | | | | | | | | | | | | | | | |
| Robbert | | Dyantha | | | Sylvana | | | Rob | | Sterrin | | Annemiek | Sandra | Won | | | Robinson | | | |
| Anouk | | | | Loek | | | Jan (2x) | | René (2x) | | | | | | Won | | Runner-Up | | | |
| Britte | | | | Loek | | | Jan | | René | | Jasmine (3x) | | | Won | | | Runner-Up | | | |
| Do | | | | | Sylvana | | | Rob | | Sterrin | | | | | Won | | Fourth Place | | | |
| JayJay | | Dyantha | | | Sylvana | | | Rob | | | | Annemiek | | | Lost | | | | | |
| Yuki | | | | Loek | | | | | René (3x) | | Jasmine | | Sandra (2x) | | Lost | | | | | |
| Sandra | | Dyantha | | | | | | | | | | | ~~Yuki (5x)~~ | | | | | | | |
| Annemiek | | Dyantha | | | Sylvana (2x) | | | | | Sterrin | | JayJay | | | | | | | | |
| Jasmine | | | | | | | Anouk (2x) | | | | Britte (3x) | | | | | | | | | |
| Sterrin | | Dyantha | | | Sylvana (2x) | | | Rob | | Annemiek (2x) | | | | | | | | | | |
| René | | | | Loek | | | Jan (2x) | | Anouk | | | | | | | | | | | |
| Rob | | Dyantha | | | Sylvana (2x) | | | Robbert (3x) | | | | | | | | | | | | |
| Jan | | | | | | | Jasmine (2x) | | | | | | | | | | | | | |
| Wietze | | | | René | | | | | | | | | | | | | | | | |
| Sylvana | | Dyantha | | | Annemiek (5x) | | | | | | | | | | | | | | | |
| Loek | | | | René | | | | | | | | | | | | | | | | |
| Défano | | | | | | | | | | | | | | | | | | | | |
| Dyantha | | Robbert | | | | | | | | | | | | | | | | | | |
| Loiza | | | | | | | | | | | | | | | | | | | | |
| Black Vote | | Rob | | | | | Britte | | | | | | | | | | | | | |
