= Expeditie Robinson 2026 =

- Season 28
- Presented by: Nicolette Kluijver; Edson da Graça; Camille Vanuxem
- No. of days: 34
- No. of castaways: 19
- Location: Malaysia

Release
- Original network: RTL 4 VTM
- Original release: 1 November 2026 – present

Season chronology
- ← Previous; 2025

Expeditie Robinson 2026 is the twenty-eighth season of the Dutch and Belgian reality television series Expeditie Robinson. This season sees the return of players from Belgium. The season has 19 celebrities from the Netherlands and Belgium compete for 34 days to live and survive on abandoned islands in tribes competing in challenges and immunity to avoid tribal council. The season sees Camille Vanuxem as a reporter alongside returning hosts Edson da Graça and Nicolette Kluijver. The season premieres on RTL 4 in the Netherlands and on streaming platform VTM GO+ in Belgium on 1 November 2026. Episodes air one week later on television in Belgium on VTM.

== Contestants ==
List of Expeditie Robinson 2026 contestants
| Contestant | Original Tribe | Post-entry | Merged Tribe | Main Game | Revenge Island | Finish |
|---|---|---|---|---|---|---|
| Maxime Meiland; 30, Reality star from The Netherlands | North Team | | | 1st voted out Day 4 | Refused offer Day 4 | 19th Day 4 |
| Wout Bru; Returns to the game | None | | | Not picked Day 2 | Won challenge Day 5 | |
| Eliyha Altena; 24, Actor from The Netherlands | South Team | South Team | | 2nd voted out Day 6 | Left competition Day 7 | 18th Day 7 |
| Omar Souidi; 41, Lawyer from Belgium | North Team | North Team | | 3rd voted out Day 8 | Current inhabitant | |
| Boaz Kok; 35, Singer from The Netherlands | North Team | North Team | | | | |
| Cath Luyten; 49, Author and presenter from Belgium | North Team | North Team | | | | |
| Denice Dest; 47, Hostess from The Netherlands | North Team | North Team | | | | |
| Denise Anna Venghaus; 31, Influencer from The Netherlands | South Team | South Team | | | | |
| Dorien Nuyts; 32, Fry shop operator from Belgium | North Team | North Team | | | | |
| Elodie Gabias; 29, Influencer from Belgium | South Team | South Team | | | | |
| Joost Swinkels; 29, Radio host from The Netherlands | South Team | South Team | | | | |
| Luka van den Keybus; 29, Gymnast from Belgium | South Team | South Team | | | | |
| Pauline Slangen; 24, Singer from Belgium | North Team | North Team | | | | |
| Pieter van der Sman; 59, Actor from The Netherlands | North Team | North Team | | | | |
| Saartje Vandendriessche; 51, Presenter from Belgium | South Team | South Team | | | | |
| Seppe "Red Sebastian" Herreman; 27, Singer from Belgium | North Team | North Team | | | | |
| Shelley Vol; 30, Singer from The Netherlands | South Team | South Team | | | | |
| Sjinkie Knegt; 37, Short-track speed skater from The Netherlands | South Team | South Team | | | | |
| Sophie Bouquet; 24, Actress from The Netherlands | South Team | South Team | | | | |
| Wout Bru; 57, Chef from Belgium | None | North Team | | | | |

== Season summary ==
| Episodes | | Challenges | | Eliminated | Vote | Finish |
| No. | Air date | Reward | Immunity | Eliminated | Vote | Finish |
|---|---|---|---|---|---|---|
| 1 | 1 November, 2026 | Pauline | | Wout | None | Not picked Day 2 |
| 1 | 1 November, 2026 | Luka & Sophie | | Wout | None | Not picked Day 2 |
| 1 | 1 November, 2026 | Red Team (Note: This reward challenge determined which camp would settle on the better South beach and which camp would settle on the worse North beach. The Red Team won, becoming South Camp.) | | Wout | None | Not picked Day 2 |
| 2 | 8 November 2026 | South Team | | Maxime | 5–1–1–1 | 1st voted out Day 4 |
| 2 | 8 November 2026 | Denice | | Maxime | 5–1–1–1 | 1st voted out Day 4 |
| 3 | 15 November 2026 | North Team | | Eliyha | 6–2 | 2nd voted out Day 6 |
| 3 | 15 November 2026 | Elodie | | Eliyha | 6–2 | 2nd voted out Day 6 |
| 4 | 22 November 2026 | South Team | | Omar | 4–3–1 | 3rd voted out Day 8 |
| 4 | 22 November 2026 | Dorien | | Omar | 4–3–1 | 3rd voted out Day 8 |

== Voting history ==
| | Original tribes | | Post-entry | |
| Episode | 1 | 2 | 3 | 4 |
|---|---|---|---|---|
| Day | 2 | 4 | 6 | 8 |
| Eliminated | Wout | Maxime | Eliyha | Omar |
| Votes | Not picked | 5–1–1–1 | 6–2 | 4–3–1 |
| Voter | Vote | | | |
| Boaz | Safe | Maxime | | Seppe |
| Cath | Safe | None (Note: The winning team is allowed to select two contestants from the losing team to compete against each other in a duel. The winner of the duel earns an additional vote, which they can either use during an upcoming elimination or save for a later stage of the competition. The loser of the duel loses their right to vote at the next elimination. Cath lost her duel to Denice, therefore losing her right to vote.) | | Omar |
| Denice | Safe | Maxime | | Omar |
| Denise Anna | Safe | | Eliyha | |
| Dorien | Safe | Maxime | | Omar |
| Elodie | Safe | | Eliyha | |
| Joost | Safe | | Eliyha | |
| Luka | Won | | Elodie | |
| Pauline | Won | Maxime | | Denice |
| Pieter | Safe | Maxime | | Omar |
| Saartje | Safe | | Eliyha | |
| Seppe | Safe | Omar | | None (Note: The winning team is allowed to select two contestants from the losing team to compete against each other in a duel. The winner of the duel earns an additional vote, which they can either use during an upcoming elimination or save for a later stage of the competition. The loser of the duel loses their right to vote at the next elimination. Seppe lost his duel to Dorien, therefore losing his right to vote.) |
| Shelley | Lost | | None (Note: The winning team is allowed to select two contestants from the losing team to compete against each other in a duel. The winner of the duel earns an additional vote, which they can either use during an upcoming elimination or save for a later stage of the competition. The loser of the duel loses their right to vote at the next elimination. Shelley lost her duel to Elodie, therefore losing her right to vote.) | |
| Sjinkie | Safe | | Eliyha | |
| Sophie | Won | | Eliyha | |
| Wout | Lost | | | Denice |
| Omar | Safe | Dorien | | Denice |
| Eliyha | Safe | | Elodie | |
| Maxime | Safe | Pieter | | |
