= Expeditie Robinson 2025 =

- Season 27
- Presented by: Nicolette Kluijver; Edson da Graça
- No. of days: 34
- No. of castaways: 20
- Winner: Camiel Kesbeke
- Runners-up: Amijé Roos van der Laan; Lies Zhara
- Location: Langkawi, Malaysia
- No. of episodes: 18

Release
- Original network: RTL 4
- Original release: 31 August – 28 December 2025

Season chronology
- ← Previous; 2024 Next → 2026

Expeditie Robinson 2025 is the twenty-seventh season of the Dutch reality television series Expeditie Robinson. The season once again has 20 celebrities from the Netherlands compete for 35 days to live and survive on abandoned islands in tribes competing in challenges and immunity to avoid tribal council. The season sees Edson da Graça as a new co-presenter alongside returning host Nicolette Kluijver. The season premieres on RTL 4 on 31 August 2025.

== Contestants ==
List of Expeditie Robinson 2025 contestants
Contestant	Original Tribe	Original Camp	Swapped Camp	Merged Tribe	Main Game	Losers' Island	Finish
Yesim Candan; 50, Journalist	Yellow Tribe	North Camp			Lost challenge Day 2		20th Day 2
Roos Dickmann; 29, Actress	Yellow Tribe	North Camp			1st voted out Day 3		19th Day 3
Demi de Boer; 29, Influencer	Yellow Tribe	North Camp			2nd voted out Day 5		18th Day 5
Stefania Liberakakis; 22, Singer	Blue Tribe	North Camp			3rd voted out Day 7		17th Day 7
Florentien van der Meulen; 53, Radio Host	Purple Tribe	South Camp			4th voted out Day 9		16th Day 9
Twan Kuyper; 29, Actor	Blue Tribe	North Camp	South Camp		6th voted out Day 13	Lost challenge Day 15	15th Day 15
Roelof Hemmen; 62, TV & Radio Presenter	Blue Tribe	North Camp	South Camp		8th voted out Day 17	Lost challenge Day 18	14th Day 18
Nordin Besling; Returned to the game	Yellow Tribe	North Camp	North Camp		5th voted out Day 11	Returnee; Day 18	
Linda Wagenmakers; Returned to the game	Purple Tribe	South Camp	South Camp		7th voted out Day 15	Returnee; Day 18	
Koen Pieter van Dijk; 33, TV Presenter	Orange Tribe	South Camp	South Camp		Lost challenge Day 18		12th Day 18
Robin Martens; 33, Actress	Purple Tribe	South Camp	South Camp		Lost challenge Day 18		12th Day 18
Vincent Croiset; 53, Actor	Blue Tribe	North Camp	North Camp	Berusong	Left competition Day 21		11th Day 21
Marieke Westenenk; 39, Actress	Orange Tribe	South Camp	North Camp	Berusong	Left competition Day 22		10th Day 22
Linda Wagenmakers; 49, Singer	Purple Tribe	South Camp	South Camp	Berusong	9th voted out Day 25		9th Day 25
Kevin Hassing; 40, Actor	Purple Tribe	South Camp	South Camp	Berusong	10th voted out Day 27		8th Day 27
Churandy Martina; 40, Former Sprinter	Blue Tribe	North Camp	North Camp	Berusong	11th voted out Day 29		7th Day 29
Tobias Camman; 36, TV Presenter	Orange Tribe	South Camp	North Camp	Berusong	12th voted out Day 31		6th Day 31
Nordin Besling; 26, Radio DJ	Yellow Tribe	North Camp	North Camp	Berusong	Lost challenge Day 33		5th Day 33
Mátyás Bittenbinder; 33, Biologist	Orange Tribe	South Camp	North Camp	Berusong	Lost challenge Day 33		4th Day 33
Amijé Roos van der Laan; 29, Influencer	Purple Tribe	South Camp	South Camp	Berusong	Runner-up		2nd Day 34
Lies Zhara; 24, Influencer	Yellow Tribe	North Camp	North Camp	Berusong	Runner-up		2nd Day 34
Camiel Kesbeke; 27, Reality TV Personality	Orange Tribe	South Camp	South Camp	Berusong	Robinson		1st Day 34

== Challenges ==
Episode	Air date	Losers' Island (ep. 8 and 10) Winners' Island (ep. 11 onwards)		Challenges			Eliminated	Vote	Finish
Episode	Air date	Winner	Loser	Reward		Immunity	Eliminated	Vote	Finish
Episode 1	31 August 2025			Twan	Green Camp (Note: This reward challenge determined which camp would settle on the better South Camp and which camp would settle on the worse North Camp. The Green Camp won, becoming South Camp.)				
Episode 1	31 August 2025			Tobias	Green Camp				
Episode 1	31 August 2025			Florentien	Green Camp				
Episode 1	31 August 2025			Lies	Green Camp				
Episode 2	7 September 2025			South Camp			Yesim	None	Lost challenge Day 2
Episode 2	7 September 2025					Blue Tribe	Roos	3–2	1st voted out Day 3
Episode 3	14 September 2025			South Camp			Demi	2–2; challenge	2nd voted out Day 5
Episode 3	14 September 2025					Blue Tribe	Demi	2–2; challenge	2nd voted out Day 5
Episode 4	21 September 2025			South Camp			Stefania	3–3; challenge	3rd voted out Day 7
Episode 4	21 September 2025					Yellow Tribe	Stefania	3–3; challenge	3rd voted out Day 7
Episode 5	28 September 2025			North Camp			Florentien	5–1	4th voted out Day 9
Episode 5	28 September 2025					Orange Tribe	Florentien	5–1	4th voted out Day 9
Episode 6	5 October 2025			South Camp			Nordin	5–2–1–1	5th voted out Day 11
Episode 7	12 October 2025			North Camp			Twan	6–4–1	6th voted out Day 13
Episode 8	19 October 2025	Nordin	Twan	North Camp			Linda	4–3	7th voted out Day 15
Episode 9	26 October 2025			North Camp			Roelof	5–1	8th voted out Day 17
Episode 10	2 November 2025	Linda	Roelof	Lies			Koen Pieter	None	Lost challenge Day 18
Episode 10	2 November 2025	Linda	Roelof	Lies			Robin	None	Lost challenge Day 18
Episode 11	9 November 2025	Amijé	Lies	Amijé [Nordin, Mátyás]			Vincent	None	Left competition Day 21
Episode 12	16 November 2025	Churandy	Amijé	Churandy [Tobias, Nordin]			Marieke	None	Left competition Day 22
Episode 13	23 November 2025	Churandy	Lies	Lies [Kevin, Camiel]			Linda	8–4–2	9th voted out Day 25
Episode 14	30 November 2025	Lies	Churandy	Lies [Kevin, Amijé]			Kevin	5–4–3–2	10th voted out Day 27
Episode 15	7 December 2025	Camiel	Lies	Camiel [Tobias]			Churandy	7–5–3	11th voted out Day 29
Episode 16	14 December 2025			Lies [Amijé]			Tobias	9–1	12th voted out Day 31
Episode 17	21 December 2025			Amijé			None		
Episode 17	21 December 2025			Camiel			None		
Episode 18	28 December 2025			Lies			Nordin	None	Lost challenge Day 33
Episode 18	28 December 2025			Lies			Mátyás	None	Lost challenge Day 33
Episode 18	28 December 2025						Amijé	None	Runner-up
Episode 18	28 December 2025						Lies	None	Runner-up
Episode 18	28 December 2025						Camiel	None	Robinson

== Voting history ==
#	Original Camps							Swapped Camps						Merged Tribe														
Episode	2		3		4		5	6	7	8	9	10		11		12		13	14	15	16	17		18				
Day	2	3	5		7		9	11	13	15	17	18		21		22	23	25	27	29	31	32	33			34		
Voted out	Yesim	Roos	Tie	Demi	Tie	Stefania	Florentien	Nordin	Twan	Linda	Roelof	Robin	Koen Pieter	Vincent	~~Nordin~~	Marieke	~~Linda~~	Linda	Kevin	Churandy	Tobias	None	None	Nordin	Mátyás	Lies	Amijé	Camiel
Votes	Challenge	3–2 (Note: After South Camp won immunity, the Blue and Yellow tribes had to duel for which tribe had to go to tribal. Yellow lost, granting immunity to the Blue Tribe. However, the Blue Tribe could cast one vote during tribal council, done by Tribe Leader Twan.)	2–2 (Note: After South Camp won immunity, the Blue and Yellow tribes had to duel for which tribe had to go to tribal. Yellow lost, granting immunity to the Blue Tribe. However, the Blue Tribe could cast one vote during tribal council, done by Tribe Leader Twan.)	Challenge	3–3 (Note: After South Camp won immunity, the Blue and Yellow tribes had to duel for which tribe had to go to tribal. Blue lost, granting immunity to the Yellow Tribe. However, the Yellow Tribe could cast one vote during tribal council, done by Tribe Leader Lies.)	Challenge	5–1 (Note: After North Camp won immunity, the Orange and Purple tribes had to duel for which tribe had to go to tribal. Purple lost, granting immunity to the Orange Tribe. However, the Orange Tribe could cast one vote during tribal council, done by Tribe Leader Tobias.)	5–2–1–1	6–4–1	4–3	5–1	Challenge		Quit	6–3–2–1–1	Quit	5–2–2–1–1	8–4–2	5–4–3–2	7–5–3	9–1	Challenge	Challenge	Challenge		Challenge		
Voter	Vote																											
Camiel							Immune		Linda	Linda	Roelof	Safe			?		Linda	Linda	Tobias	?	Tobias (3x)	Safe	Won			Robinson		
Amijé							Florentien		Twan	Linda	Roelof	Safe			Churandy		Linda	Linda	Tobias	?	Tobias	Won				Runner-up		
Lies		Nordin	Demi	Won	Stefania			Tobias				Won			Kevin		Linda	Linda	Tobias	?	Tobias	Safe	Safe	Won		Runner-up		
Mátyás							Immune	Nordin				Safe			Churandy		Linda	Linda	Tobias	?	Tobias	Safe	Safe	Lost				
Nordin		Roos	Lies		Immune			Vincent				Safe			Linda		Tobias	Linda	Kevin (3x)	Tobias	Tobias	Safe	Safe	Lost				
Tobias							Florentien	Nordin				Safe			?		Lies	Amijé (2x)	Amijé (2x)	Churandy (2x)	Mátyás							
Churandy		Immune	Immune		Roelof			Vincent				Safe			Linda		Linda	Linda	Kevin (2x)	Tobias								
Kevin							Florentien		Linda	Linda	Roelof	Safe			?		Nordin	Nordin	Nordin (2x)									
Linda							Florentien		Twan	Roelof		Safe			?		Kevin	Nordin (3x)										
Marieke							Immune	Nordin (2x)				Safe			?													
Vincent	Won	Immune	Immune		Stefania			Nordin				Safe																
Koen Pieter							Immune		Twan (2x)	Roelof	Roelof	Lost																
Robin							Florentien		Twan	Roelof	Roelof	Lost																
Roelof		Immune	Immune		Stefania	Won			Twan	Linda	Kevin																	
Twan		Roos	Demi		Roelof				Linda (2x)																			
Florentien							Kevin																					
Stefania		Immune	Immune		Roelof	Lost																						
Demi		Roos	Lies	Lost																								
Roos		Nordin																										
Yesim	Lost																											
Black Vote								Mátyás	Camiel						~~Vincent~~		Nordin	Linda (2x)	Nordin	Churandy								
Black Vote								Mátyás	Camiel						~~Vincent~~		Lies	Linda (2x)	Nordin	Churandy								
