= Geraldine Kemper =

Dutch television presenter and presenter (born 1990)

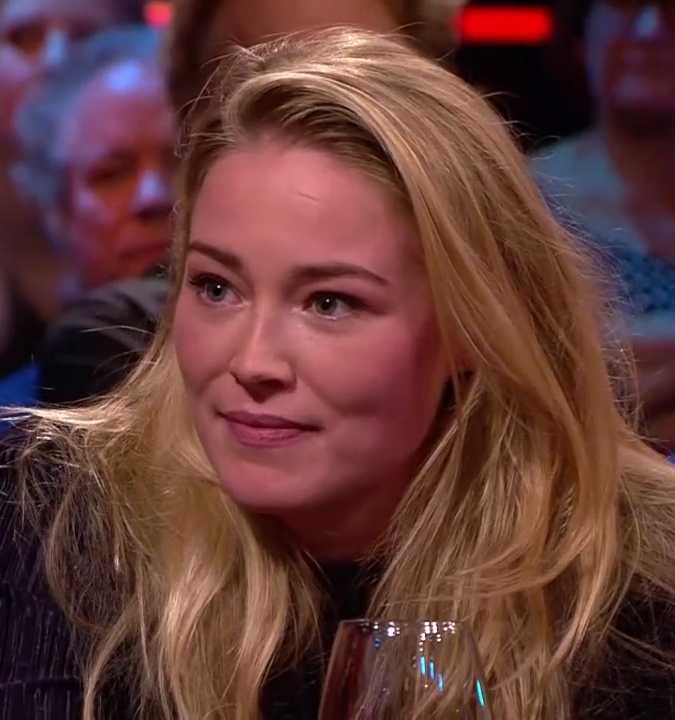
- Kemper in 2017
- Born: Geraldine Jane Kemper; 26 January 1990 (age 36); Volendam, Netherlands
- Years active: 2009–
- Presenting career
- Show: Big Brother
- Previous shows: Sterretje Gezocht; Try Before You Die; Spuiten en Slikken; 3 op Reis

Geraldine Jane Kemper (born 26 January 1990) is a Dutch television presenter originally from BNN. She won her job as a presenter with this public broadcaster through the television programme Sterretje Gezocht. In 2015 and 2016 Kemper was nominated for the Zilveren Televizier-Ster Vrouw. In 2019 it has been announced Kemper will transfer to RTL.

== Biography ==
Kemper was born and grew up in Volendam and lives in Amsterdam. She studied sports management and had a part-time job with her uncle and aunt behind the counter of a fish shop in Almere.

She is an athlete at AV Edam. That was also Kemper's reason for following her hbo studies in sports and marketing management.

=== BNN ===
==== Sterretje Gezocht ====
When Geraldine saw the call for the BNN programme Sterretje Gezocht, she immediately registered. Her dream was therefore to become a VJ at TMF or a presenter at BNN.

A total of about eight thousand women registered. In the end Kemper managed to become the new star of BNN after eight weeks. She defeated Fleur in the final with 60% of the jury points and 60% of the votes of the audience. That meant that she got a role in the soap opera Onderweg naar Morgen and became a presenter of Try Before You Die. In addition, Valerio Zeno announced during the final that the winner would immediately start the day after the finale as the presenter of Spuiten en Slikken Zomertour; Geraldine replaced Zarayda Groenhart for one episode.

==== Try Before you Die ====
In 2009 she made her appearance in season 5 of Try Before You Die, in the company of Steyn de Leeuwe, Valerio Zeno, Filemon Wesselink, Nicolette Kluijver, Dennis Storm, Zarayda Groenhart and Sander Lantinga. In the challenge she tackled challenges like: "participating in the tough guy challenge", "French kissing with an elderly man", "taking pictures in Volendam clothing" and "making the biggest crop circle".

In 2011 she presented Try Before You Die 2.

==== Spuiten en Slikken ====
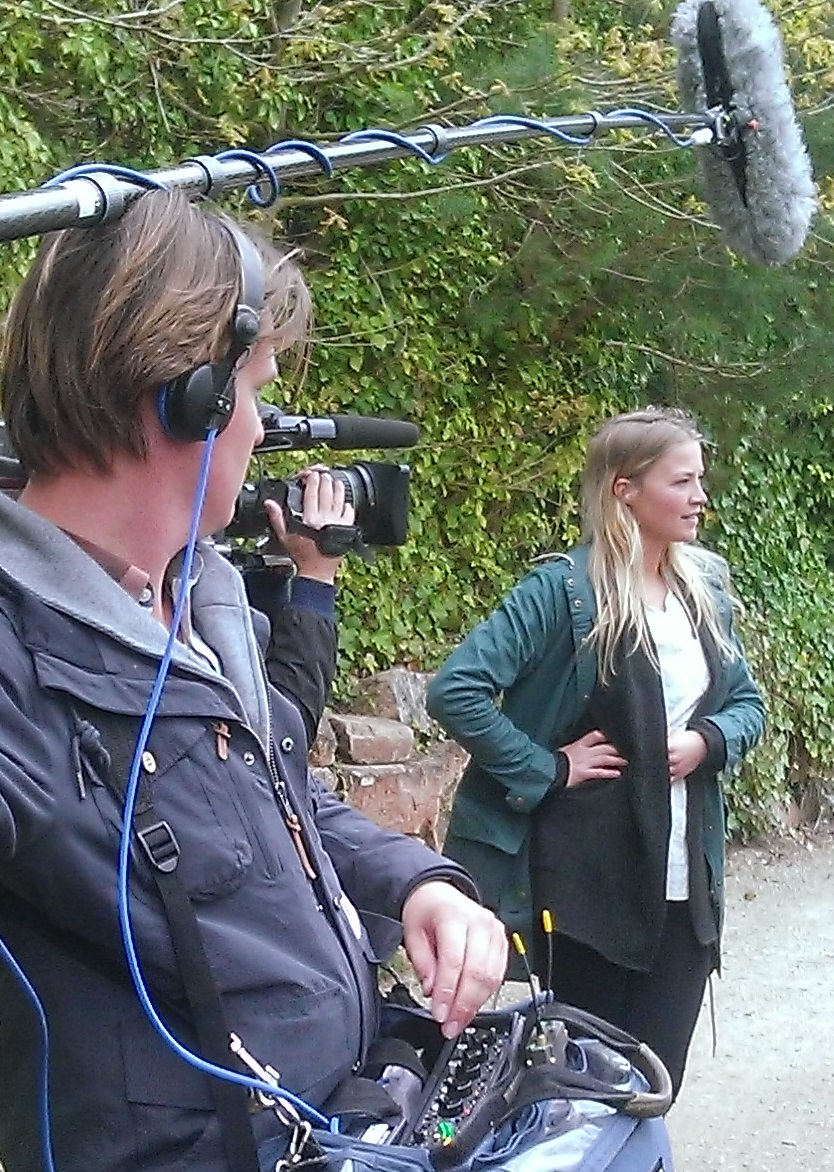
Geraldine Kemper during shooting for Spuiten en Slikken (April 2014).

At the last moment Kemper was allowed to make one episode of Spuiten en Slikken Zomertour as reporter. By the departure of Filemon Wesselink from Spuiten en Slikken, Nicolette Kluijver and Zarayda Groenhart were given Filemon's place and a place was released. Kemper, who therefore already replaced one episode for Groenhart, belonged from season 9 to the regular squad of Spuiten en Slikken. In Spuiten en Slikken she does the experiments, called Gerries Eerste Keer. From 2014 she also takes on the general presentation, together with Tim Hofman.

==== 3 op Reis ====
Since 2012 she also presents 3 op Reis. She attracted the Caribbean and a road trip through Europe. She also presented 3 op Reis Summertime.

==== 101 TV ====
Kemper has also been presenting Trick Mania on 101 TV since 2009. On the internet platform of BNN 101 she presented Repo and Lekker Langzaam.

==== Jan vs Geraldine ====
From 2015, Kemper was seen with Jan Versteegh in the programme Jan vs Geraldine, an expansion on the BNN series "Versus".

=== RTL ===
In 2019, it was announced that Kemper would be moving to RTL, where she is going to be a presenter for Expeditie Robinson Videoland and The Voice of Holland

In 2022, Kemper and Art Rooijakkers present the Expeditie Robinson: All Stars season of the television series Expeditie Robinson. In the same year, she was also a contestant in the television show Het Perfecte Plaatje.

She succeeded Kees Tol as presenter of the show vtwonen: Weer verliefd op je huis in November 2026.

=== Other television appearances ===
Kemper participated in Expeditie Robinson 2013, in which she played the final together with former judoka Edith Bosch and dancer Anna-Alicia Sklias. Bosch finished first. In the week before Christmas she was one of the sleeping guests in the Glass House of 3FM Serious Request.

In 2026, she was a guest in an episode of the television show Dit was het nieuws.

== Filmography ==
=== Television ===
- Acting
  - Onderweg naar Morgen – BNN – 2010 – as Monique (season 17)
- Presenting
  - Spuiten en Slikken Zomertour – BNN – 2009 – 1 episode
  - Spuiten en Slikken – BNN – 2009–16 – did Experiments (Gerries First Time)
  - Try Before You Die – BNN – 2009–10
  - Trick Mania – 101 TV – 2009
  - Lekker Langzaam – 101 TV – 2010
  - 101 Repo – 101 TV – 2010
  - Try Before You Die 2 – BNN – 2011
  - Nu we er toch zijn op vakantie – BNN – 2011
  - 3 op Reis Summertime – BNN – 2012
  - 3 op Reis – BNN/BNNVARA – 2012–present
  - The Next MC – 101 TV – 2013
  - De Nationale 2013 test – BNN – 2013
  - De Social Club – BNN – 2014
  - Ruben vs Geraldine – BNN – 2014
  - 3 op Reis Backpack – BNN – 2015
  - Jan vs Geraldine – BNN – 2016
  - Proefkonijnen – BNN – 2016–present
  - Misbruikt – BNNVARA – 2017
  - Verkracht of niet? – BNNVARA – 2017
  - De Nationale 2017 Test – BNNVARA – 2017
  - De Nationale Reistest 2018 – BNNVARA – 2018
  - Big Brother – RTL – 2021–2025
  - Five Days Inside – RTL – 2021–2024
- Candidate
  - Sterretje Gezocht – BNN – 2009
  - Expeditie Robinson – RTL – 2013
  - Chantal blijft slapen – RTL – 2016
  - Quickest Quiz – BNN – 2017
  - Britt's Beestenbende – 2020
  - Wie is de Mol? – 2026
- As herself
  - Dit was het nieuws – 2026

== Trivia ==
- Kemper is the niece of singer Maribelle.
- She posed for FHM in 2009.
