= De Worsten van Babel =

Dutch TV chef trio

De Worsten van Babel ("The Sausages of Babel") are a Dutch trio (chef Hugo Kennis and actor brothers Jasper & Marius Gottlieb) who present a series of television programmes involving travel and food for 24Kitchen, as well an in-person show. They have also written cookbooks together. Their first collaboration featured a sausage with three courses and an espresso coffee as a filling.

== Members ==
=== Hugo Kennis ===
Hugo Kennis
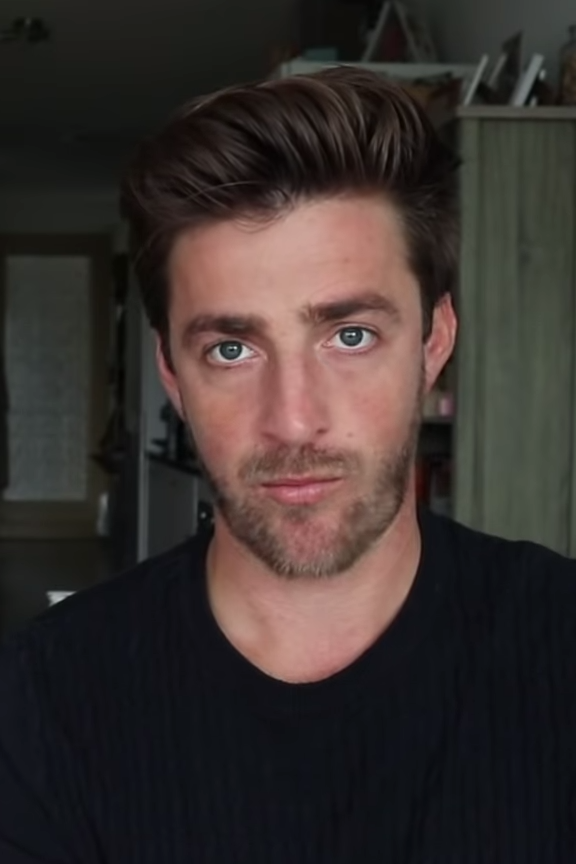
- Hugo Kennis in 2019
- Born: 17 April 1986; Eindhoven
- Known for: Eigen Huis & Tuin:Lekker Leuven

Hugo Kennis, from North Brabant, trained as a chef and catering manager at De Rooi Pannen in Eindhoven and Tilburg. He also studied Musical Theatre at the Fontys School of Fine and Performing Arts.

On the culinary channel 24Kitchen he presented the children's cooking program Smaakpupillen. He was also one of the chefs in the 24Kitchen shows, Food Truck Challenge, Grenzeloos Koken and De Eenvoudige Maaltijd. In 2010, he was understudy in the musical theatre production Je Anne ("I, Anne") by Mark Vijn. In 2011, he played a role in the SpangaS live stage show. In 2017, Kennis was briefly seen in Goede tijden, slechte tijden soap opera as the Italian chef Antonio. In 2018, Kennis participated in the Een goed stel hersens game show.

In 2019, Kennis won the twentieth season of the RTL show Expeditie Robinson. In the spring of 2022, Kennis was seen after three years in the special season Expeditie Robinson: All Stars, in which former (semi)finalists compete with each other to become the ultimate Robinson. This time he was eliminated in the fourth episode and finished in twelfth place.

In 2018 he became the permanent chef in the RTL 4 afternoon program 5 Uur Live. After that he became the permanent chef in the daily RTL program Eigen Huis & Tuin:Lekker Leven.

In 2022, Kennis took part in the Halloween season of De Verraders, first as a faithful and later as a traitor on Videoland. That same year, Kennis was seen in the Waku Waku quiz show, and worked with Thomas Cammaert in the Christmas special of LEGO Masters. He was also a judge in a national Oliebollen-making competitions for SBS6.

In 2023, Kennis won the first season of RTL 4's Race Across the World with DJ Eva Cleven. In the same year, Kennis also participated in the Make Up Your Mind celebrity drag queen competition on RTL 4. In 2024, he participated in the television program Voor het blok together with Cleven. That same year, Kennis also participated in the television program Say Whut!? In addition, he participated in The Connection quiz show in 2024 on NPO 1.

In July 2021, Kennis split from his fiance, dancer Sander Vos, after a relationship lasting more than six years.

In a 2020 interview Kennis discussed the trio making "dishes in an extreme form" and that their first dish was "one sausage that was filled with a three-course dinner. So a starter, a main course, a dessert and even an espresso to finish" and that their name De Worsten ("The Sausages") derives from that dish.

=== Jasper Gottlieb ===
Jasper Gottlieb
- Born: 29 May 1989 (age 37)
- Years active: 1997-present
- Known for: SpangaS
- Notable work: Character

Jasper Gottlieb is a Dutch actor, presenter and podcaster. He is best known for his role in the SpangaS soap opera and as a (football) presenter and podcast maker. He studied at the Utrecht School of the Arts and the Gerrit Rietveld Academie.

He presents Weekendcrashers on NPO 3. He also presents Studio Jaxie, a talk show on AT5 about AFC Ajax. He is one of the two hosts of Studio Socrates, a podcast about "everything that makes football beautiful". In Studio Socrates, Gottlieb discusses an aspect of football with Daan Sutorius every week. The podcast is named after the Brazilian footballer Sócrates.

Gottlieb is a curator at the Lisser Art Museum (LAM). In 2023 he acquired the De Druif restaurant in Amsterdam with Xander Waller.

==== Filmography ====
- Character (1997), as Jacob (age 6)
- Amazones (2004), as Moes
- Allerzielen (2005), as Dylan
- SpangaS (2007-2011), as Flip van Hamel
- SpangaS op Survival (2009), as Flip van Hamel
- Happy End (2009), als Moshe
- Verliefd op Ibiza (2013), as Dylan
- Wat maak je menu? presenter, with Marius, NTR (2020)

=== Marius Gottlieb ===
Marius Gottlieb
- Born: 29 May 1989 (age 37)
- Years active: 1997-present
- Known for: SpangaS
- Notable work: Character; Radeloos

Marius Gottlieb is a Dutch actor. He is best known for his role in the Dutch youth drama series SpangaS.

In 2008, he starred in Radeloos, based on the book by Carry Slee. The Gottlieb brothers also played together in Character. After SpangaS, Gottlieb obtained a graphic design diploma at the Royal Academy of Art, in The Hague.

==== Filmography ====
- Character (1997), as Jacob (age 6)
- Moonlight (2002), as New Boy
- Erik of het klein insectenboek (2004), as Papilio
- Nieuwe Ouders (2005), as "Tweeling"
- Bruno en Violet (2005), as Pestkop
- Don (2006), as Miloš
- SpangaS (2007-2011), as Tobias van Hamel
- Keyzer & De Boer Advocaten (2008), as Rick Heesters jr. (Episode, Offside)
- Radeloos (2008), as Paco
- Doorbraak (2008), as Tommy Groothart
- SpangaS op Survival (2009), as Tobias van Hamel
- Vroeger was het anders, NTR (2012)
- Verliefd op Ibiza (2013), as Boyd
- StukTV (2015)
- Wat maak je menu? presenter, with Jasper, NTR (2020)

== Television ==
=== De Worsten van Babel op de Camping ===
This is a 10-episode series from 2017, involving the trio staying at campsites across The Netherlands, and cooking meals based on ingredients available (including through foraging on the site itself).

=== De Worsten van Babel On Tour ===
This 10-episode series from 2017, involved the boys travelling by camper-van across Europe from The Netherlands to Spain.
