= Valentijn de Hingh =

Dutch model (born 1990)

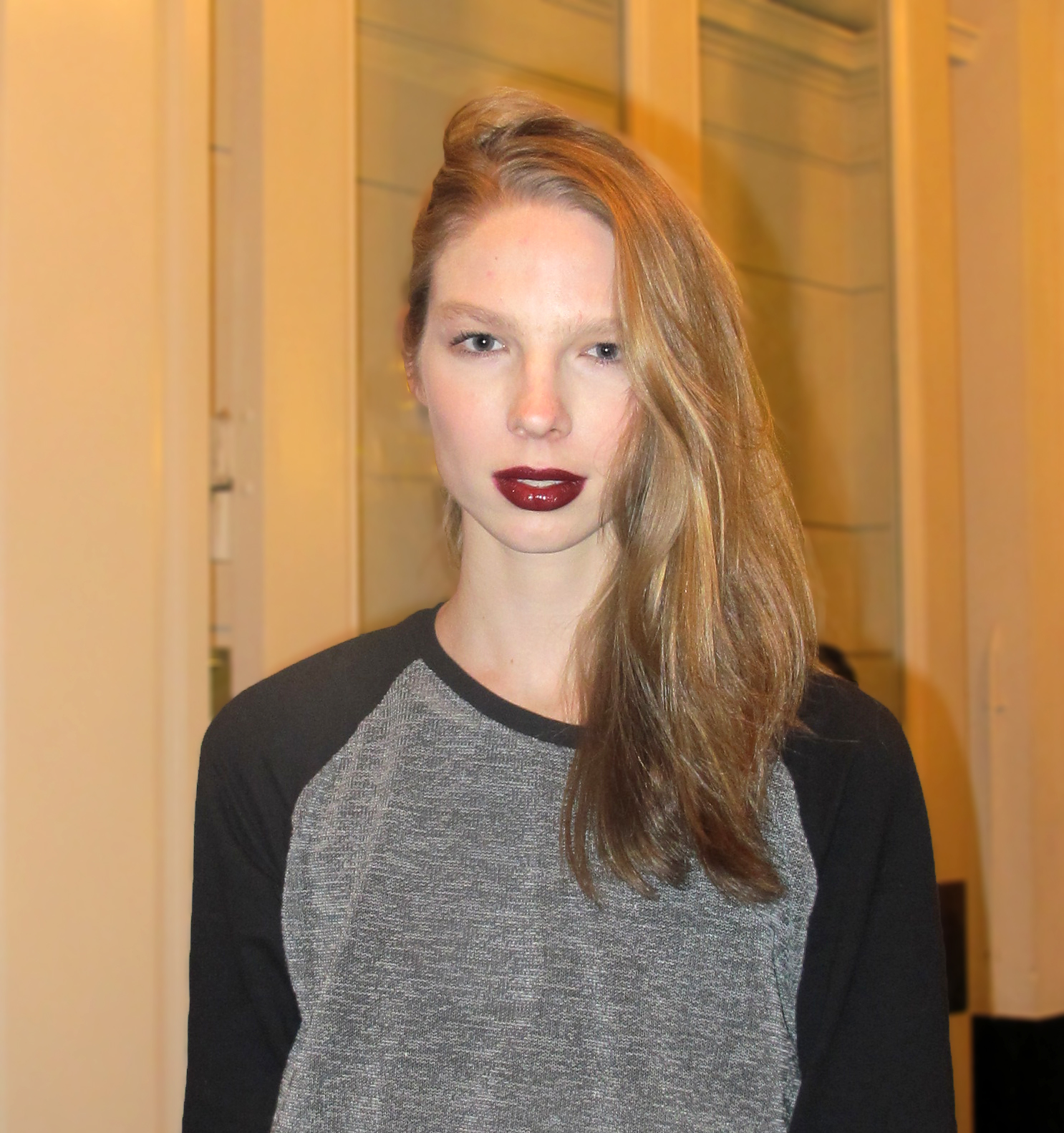
Valentijn de Hingh

Valentijn de Hingh (born 5 May 1990 in Amsterdam, Netherlands) is a transgender Dutch model. From the age of 8 until the age of 17 de Hingh was filmed for the Dutch television program "Valentijn" and had gender affirmation surgery shortly after the conclusion of that project. She was a contestant on Expeditie Robinson 2013 that year's installment and the eighth edition of the Dutch version of the American reality television program Survivor.

De Hingh became a runway model in 2008 and has since walked it for Comme des Garçons and Maison Martin Margiela and other fashion houses. She has been the photographed by Patrick Demarchelier. De Hingh is the first transgender person ever to have been represented by IMG Models, which has since added at least one other transgender model to its roster. In 2012, de Hingh won the Elle Personal Style Award.
