= Rob Geus =

Dutch television cook and TV personality (born 1971)

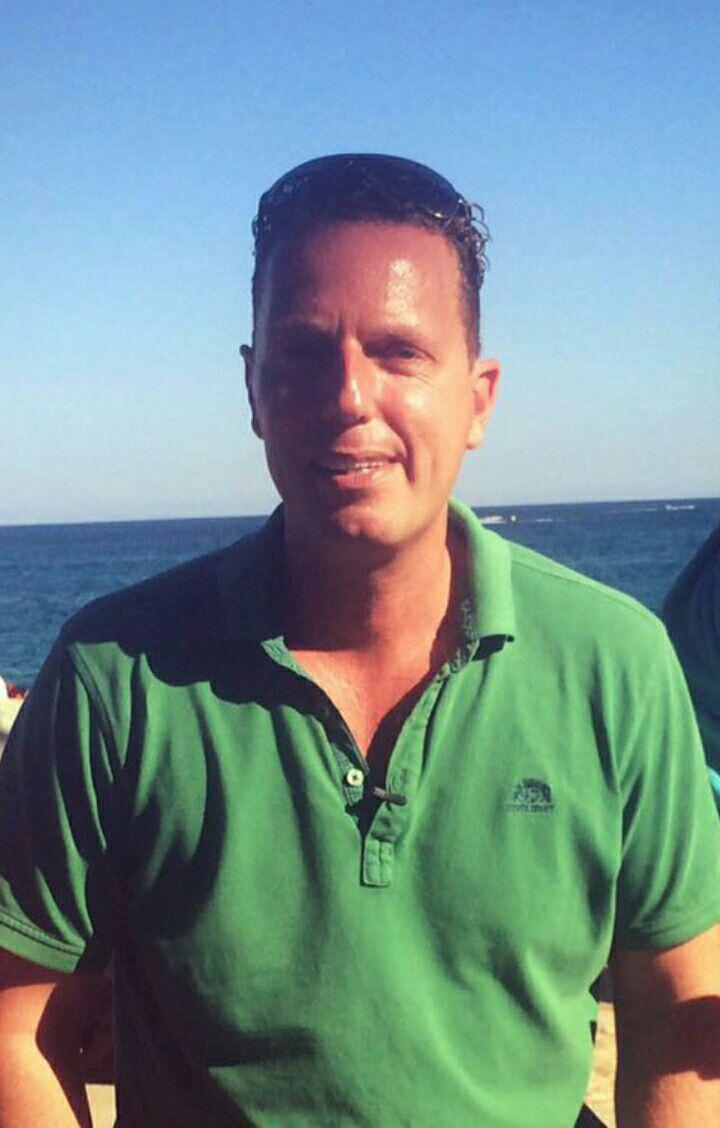
- Born: 15 July 1971 (age 55); Rotterdam, Netherlands
- Occupations: Cook, presenter
- Years active: 2002-present
- Career
- Show: De Smaakpolitie, Red mijn vakantie!
- Country: Netherlands
- Website: www.robgeus.nl

Rob Geus (born 15 July 1971 in Rotterdam) is a Dutch cook and TV presenter.

== Career ==
Geus started the TV show De Smaakpolitie on SBS6 in 2002 with Maureen Du Toit. In this show, Geus visits restaurants and student residences to check their kitchens for hygiene and safety. When Geus is convinced that the restaurant meets the hygiene and safety standards, he awards said restaurant with a Smaakpolitie OK-sticker. If the hygiene is sub par, Geus hands over a T-shirt with his catchphrase "Hier word ik niet vrolijk van" [This does not make me happy], a one liner Geus used since the first season. In 2006, Geus recorded a single with this title, in cooperation with Gebroeders Ko. The programme De Smaakpolitie attracted an average of almost a million viewers per episode in 2007.

In 2008, Geus appeared in TV commercials promoting Stichting Promotie Kalfsvlees, an organisation promoting the use of veal. The commercials were pulled off the air after complaints from viewers, animal rights groups, and the Dutch government, which accused the organisation of painting an overly optimistic view on the welfare of calves used for veal production. In 2015, the TV show Rambam criticized Geus for his so called "quality mark" which according to Rambam is a commercial logo and not a recognised quality mark.

Besides De Smaakpolitie, Geus presented the TV show Red mijn Vakantie! with Alberto Stegeman. In this show Geus and Stegeman tried to solve issues of Dutch people on their holiday destinations. He was also a contender on the shows Ranking the Stars (BNN/RTL 5, Sterren Dansen Op Het IJs and Stelletje Pottenbakkers! (both SBS6)

Geus opened his own pancake restaurant on 4 September 2010, but sold it after two years. In October 2017, he opened a new restaurant in Barendrecht.

After 18 years, Geus' contract with SBS6 was not renewed, after which he started working for RTV Rijnmond, a Dutch regional broadcasting company. In 2019, Geus was one of the contestants in the 20th season of the Dutch reality show Expeditie Robinson (RTL 4), he finished in 16th place. In the same year, he participated in The Roast of Ali B on Comedy Central. Geus returned in the 21st season of Expeditie Robinson in 2021 as one of eight former contenders. This time, he finished in 12th place. He also participated in the TV show De Alleskunner VIPS and finished in 19th place.

In 2026, he presents De Hygiënepolitie, a show about cleanliness.

== Personal life ==
Geus lives in Barendrecht with his wife Suzanne, and has a daughter and a son. Besides his TV work, Geus released XG2, which is his own brand of cleaning products. He also plays football in a "star team" for Foundation KiKa (a Dutch charity foundation for the research of childhood cancer) and the Make-A-Wish Foundation.

== Filmography ==
Television
Year	Production	Channel	Number of episodes	Start
2002 - 2017	De Smaakpolitie	SBS6	134	27 February 2002
2007	Sterren Dansen Op Het IJs	SBS6	1	11 January 2007
2008, 2019, 2021	Ranking the Stars	BNN / RTL 5	36	7 November 2008, 4 September 2019, 27 October 2021
2008 - 2016	Red Mijn Vakantie!	SBS6	68	31 August 2008
2013	Drekwerk	SBS6	8	30 March 2013
2016	Smerige zaken	SBS6	4	22 May 2016
2018	Stelletje Pottenbakkers!	SBS6	5	4 March 2018
2019	Expeditie Robinson 2019	RTL4	16	1 September 2019
2019	Comedy Central Roast	Comedy Central	4	17 December 2019
2021	De Alleskunner VIPS	SBS6	28	20 August 2021
2021	Expeditie Robinson 2021	RTL 4	33	29 August 2021

== Publications ==
- Kook OK, 2005, Kosmos Uitgevers, ISBN 9789021584911
- Hier word ik vrolijk van, 2011, Trichis Publishing, ISBN 9789490608224
- De echte Geus, 2021, Uitgeverij De Leeuw B.V, ISBN 9789090353104
