= Expeditie Robinson 2013 =

- Season 15
- No. of episodes: 16

Release
- Original network: RTL 5
- Original release: August 29 – December 12, 2013

Season chronology
- ← Previous; 2012 Next → 2014

Expeditie Robinson 2013 is the fifteenth season of the RTL 5 reality television series Expeditie Robinson first aired on August 29, 2013. It's the eighth season hosted by Evi Hanssen and the second season hosted by Dennis Weening.

This is the first season without contestants from Belgium, due to lack of television ratings in Belgium.

== Survivors ==
Contestants	Episodes															Finish	Total votes
Contestants	01	02	03	04	05	06	07	08	09	10	11	12	13	14	15	Finish	Total votes
Edith Bosch; 33, former judoka																Winner	6
Anna-Alicia Sklias; 26, dancer and MTV VJ																Runner-Up	15
Geraldine Kemper; 23, TV host																Runner-Up	6
Kees Boot; 43, actor																Eliminated; 4th	2
Zimra Geurts; 22, playmate, model and reporter																Voted Out 6th 5th	15
Hans Ubbink; 51, fashion designer																Voted Out 5th 6th	10
Paulien Huizinga; 42, TV host and former Miss Nederland																Voted Out 4th 7th	16
Géza Weisz; 26, actor and DJ																Voted Out 3rd 8th	6
Jan Versteegh; 27, reporter																Voted Out 2nd 9th	8
Sef; 29, rapper																Voted Out 1st 10th	18
Sanne Vogel; 29, actor, writer and theatre director																Eliminated; 11th	1
Valentijn de Hingh; 23, model																Eliminated; 12th	6
Robert Kranenborg; 62, chef																Eliminated; 13th	5
Veronica van Hoogdalem; 23, TV host																Quit voluntarily 14th	5
Everon Jackson Hooi; 31, actor																Eliminated; 15th	7
Negativ; 30, rapper																Quit voluntarily 16th	0

Kamp Noord
Kamp Zuid
Mensirip
Winnaarseiland
Duivelseiland

== Future appearances ==
Edith Bosch returned to compete in Expeditie Robinson: All Stars.
