= Expeditie Robinson 2018 =

- Season 19
- Presented by: Dennis Weening & Nicolette Kluijver
- No. of days: 32
- No. of castaways: 21
- Winner: Jan Bronninkreef
- Runners-up: Dominique Hazeleger & Gregory Sedoc
- Location: Caramoan, Philippines
- No. of episodes: 16

Release
- Original release: 6 September – 20 December 2018

Season chronology
- ← Previous; 2017 Next → 2019

Expeditie Robinson 2018 is the nineteenth season of the Dutch version of the Swedish television series Expedition Robinson. This season, seven non-celebrities compete against two teams of seven celebrities to win €25,000 and win the title of Robinson 2018. The season premiered on 6 September 2018.

== Finishing order ==
Contestant	Original Tribe	Absorbed Tribe	Merged Tribe	Voted Out	Devil's Island	Finish
Toine van Peperstraten; 50, Presenter	North Team			1st Voted Out; Day 3		21st Day 3
Famke Louise; 19, Singer/YouTuber	North Team			2nd Voted Out; Day 5		20th Day 5
Aisha "I Am Aisha" Echteld; 40, Hip-Hop Artist	South Team			Left Competition; Day 8		19th Day 8
Joost "Josylvio" Dowib; 26, Rapper	South Team			3rd Voted Out; Day 8		18th Day 8
Donny Roelvink; 20, Model	South Team	North Team		4th Voted Out; Day 10		17th Day 10
Tony Junior; 28, DJ	North Team	North Team		Left Competition; Day 10		16th Day 10
Nienke Plas; Returned to Game	South Team	Devil's Island		Not Picked; Day 9	Won Challenge; Day 12	
Gwenda Nielen; 39, Amersfoort	Unknowns Team	Unknowns Team		5th Voted Out; Day 13		15th Day 13
Corry Konings; 66, Singer	South Team	Devil's Island		Not Picked; Day 9	Lost Challenge; Day 15	14th Day 15
Sandra Spreij; 51, Zwolle	Unknowns Team	Unknowns Team		6th Voted Out; Day 15		13th Day 15
Johnny Kraaijkamp Jr. 64, Actor	North Team	Devil's Island		Not Picked; Day 9	Lost Challenge; Day 16	12th Day 16
Nienke Plas; Returned to Game	South Team	North Team		Lost Challenge; Day 16	Won Challenge; Day 16	
Özgür "Ozzy" Aksan; 29, Zutphen	Unknowns Team	Unknowns Team	Inayun Ayunan	7th Voted Out; Day 18		11th Day 18
Jody Bernal; 36, Singer	South Team	North Team	Inayun Ayunan	Left Competition; Day 20		10th Day 20
Stijn Fransen; 28, Actor	North Team	North Team	Inayun Ayunan	8th Voted Out; Day 23		9th Day 23
Nienke Plas; 32, Comedian/YouTuber	South Team	North Team	Inayun Ayunan	9th Voted Out; Day 25		8th Day 25
Robin Bakker; 26, Spijkenisse	Unknowns Team	Unknowns Team	Inayun Ayunan	10th Voted Out; Day 27		7th Day 27
Loiza Lamers; 23, Model, Businesswoman	North Team	North Team	Inayun Ayunan	11th Voted Out; Day 30		6th Day 30
Laurie Scheerder; 24, Utrecht	Unknowns Team	Unknowns Team	Inayun Ayunan	Lost Challenge; Day 31		5th Day 31
Steven Brunswijk; 34, Comedian	South Team	North Team	Inayun Ayunan	Lost Challenge; Day 31		4th Day 31
Dominique Hazeleger; 21, Horst	Unknowns Team	Unknowns Team	Inayun Ayunan	Runner-Up; Day 32		2nd / 3rd Day 32
Gregory Sedoc; 36, Former hurdler	North Team	North Team	Inayun Ayunan	Runner-Up; Day 32		2nd / 3rd Day 32
Jan Bronninkreef; 53, Holten	Unknowns Team	Unknowns Team	Inayun Ayunan	Robinson; Day 32		1st Day 32

== Future appearances ==
Loiza Lamers returned to compete in Expeditie Robinson 2021. Dominique Hazeleger, Gregory Sedoc, and Jan Bronninkreef returned to compete in Expeditie Robinson: All Stars.
