= Sterren Dansen Op Het IJs =

Sterren Dansen Op Het IJs is a Dutch spin-off of British show Dancing on Ice. The first four seasons were hosted by singer(s) Gerard Joling and Nance Coolen. Tess Milne replaced the latter for the fifth season.

== Jury ==
- Peter Moormann
- Jayne Hamelink
- Wil Visser
- Marc Forno
- Katarina Witt (Only in the first show and final season 1)

== Season 1 ==
=== Contestants ===
- Hein Vergeer (Former World Champion speed skating) Winner
- Jody Bernal (Singer) 2nd
- Maud Mulder (Runner-up Idols Netherlands Season 2) 3rd
- Annamarie Thomas (Former speed skater) 4th
- Ellemieke Vermolen (Presenter) 5th
- Laura Vlasblom (Singer) 6th
- Mari van de Ven (Stylist) 7th
- Klaas Wilting (Former policeman) 8th
- Marga Scheide (Member of girl group Luv') 9th
- Leontien van Moorsel (Former Olympic and World-Champion cyclist) 10th
- Joao Varela (Former Dutch parliament member) 11th

== Season 2 ==
=== Contestants ===
- Sita Vermeulen (Singer) Winner
- Geert Hoes (Actor) 2nd
- Thomas Berge (Singer) 3rd
- Jasmine Sendar (Actress) 4th
- Petra Kagchelland (Actress) 5th
- Corry Konings (Singer) 6th
- Arend Langeberg (Presenter) 7th
- Jeroen Blijlevens (Former professional cyclist) 8th
- Gallyon van Wessem (Presenter) 9th
- Dries Roelvink (Singer) 10th
- Bas Westerweel (Presenter) 11th
- Elle van Rijn (Actress) 12th
- Kristina Bozilovic (Presenter) 13th

== Wildcard Show ==
=== Contestants ===
- Petra Kagchelland (Actress) Wildcard Winner
- Patty Brard (TV presenter / Member of girl group Luv')
- Rob Geus (Presenter)
- Lola Brood (Daughter of Herman Brood)
- Mike Staring (Presenter)
