= Berdien Stenberg =

Dutch flautist and politician (born 1957)

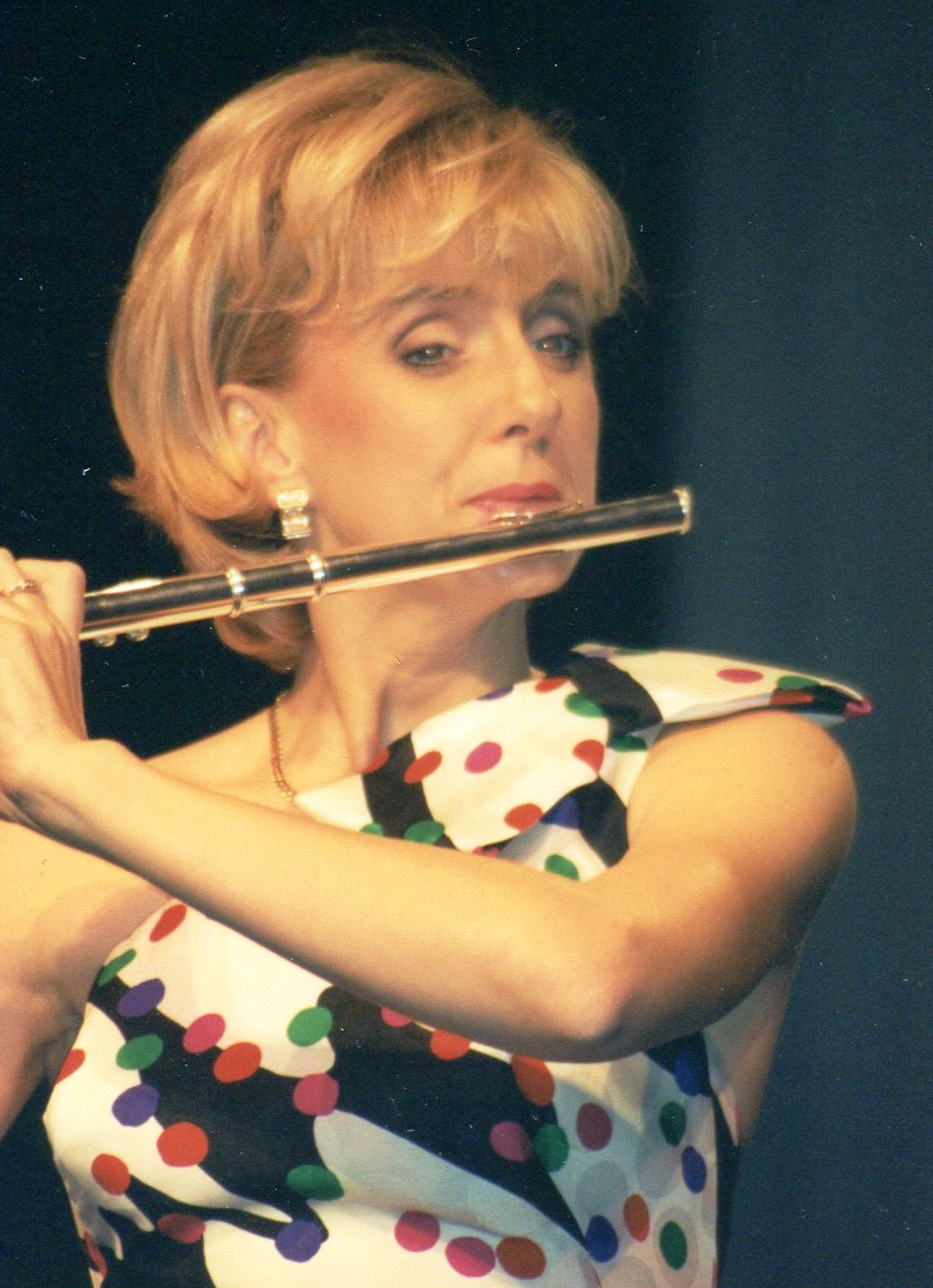
- Stenberg during a concert in Leuven

Background information
- Born: Berdien Steunenberg; 30 July 1957 (age 69); Almelo, Netherlands
- Genres: Classical; light classical
- Occupations: Politician; musician
- Instrument: Western concert flute
- Years active: 1983–present
- Website: berdienstenberg.com

Member of the municipal council of Almere
- In office 1998–2010

Wethouder of the municipality of Almere
- In office 2010–2012

Personal details
- Party: CDA

Berdien Steunenberg, known professionally as Berdien Stenberg (born 30 July 1957) is a Dutch flautist who was active in the 1980s and 90s. Her recordings were successful internationally, leading her to obtain more than 25 gold and platinum records and sell several millions of records. She later became active in municipal politics.

== Biography ==
=== Musical career ===
After high school, Stenberg followed classical flute training at the Royal Conservatory of The Hague. Her first single from 1983, "Rondo Russo" (the shortened last movement from the Concerto in E minor by Saverio Mercadante), became number one on the Dutch charts and was successful in other European countries. In the following years, Berdien Stenberg released a number of singles and albums, such as "Ode to Amadeus" and "The Brandenburgs" with Jaap van Zweden, Flute Fiesta with orchestra leader James Last and Amour pour Amour with Richard Clayderman.

The successor to "Rondo Russo", "Vivace" reached number 28 on the Dutch Top 40 and number 27 on the National Hit Parade. Other singles did not get further than the Tip Parade. In total, Stenberg has sold several million CDs and was partly responsible for making classical music accessible to the general public. Stenberg has performed all over the world, not only throughout Europe, but also in Japan, China, Indonesia and the United States. Shortening her surname Steunenberg to the more international-sounding Stenberg was an idea of Paul van Vliet.

Stenberg still performs: together with cellist Roeland Duijne and pianist Rie Tanaka she forms the trio Classical Company.

=== Political career ===
In 1998, Steunenberg joined the municipal council of her hometown Almere on behalf of the Christian Democratic Appeal (CDA). She was a lijstduwer in the 2002 elections, but was re-elected on the basis of preferential votes. She later also became deputy party leader. From 19 May 2010 to 29 March 2012 she was a wethouder (alderwoman) on behalf of CDA and ChristenUnie with a portfolio of urban management, enforcement and supervision, environment, recreation and culture. On 29 March 2012 she resigned after the full municipal council passed a motion of no confidence due to inadequate performance.

=== Other ===
Outside of politics, she has campaigned for the rights of musicians and actors by first founding the interest group VIE and later, in collaboration with Huub Stapel, the rights organizations IRDA and IRB. These organizations exploited the rights of actors and musicians.

In 2013 Stenberg was diagnosed with breast cancer and in 2014 she wrote a book about it: Hallo allemaal, mijn moeder die is kaal ('Hello everyone, my mother is bald').

In 2019, Stenberg was one of the participants of the twentieth season of the RTL 4 television programme Expeditie Robinson, she finished third and finished in 18th place.

== Discography ==
=== Albums ===
- Rondo Russo (Philips/Phonogram, 1983)
- Berdinerie (Philips, 1984)
- Christmas (Dino, 1986)
- Flute Fiesta (Polydor, 1988) — with James Last
- Amour pour amour (Dino, 1989) — with Richard Clayderman
- Melodies d'amour (Dino, 1992)

=== Singles ===
- "Allegro (From Trumpet Concert In E Flat)" (Polydor, 1983)
- "Rondo Russo" (Philips, 1983)
- "The Moldau" (Philips, 1983)
- "Fairy Minuet" (Canyon, 1984)
- "Vivace" (Philips, 1984)
- "Fire Dance" (Philips, 1985)
- "Carmen" (Polydor, 1987)
- "Ayacucho" (Polydor, 1988) — with James Last
- "Flower" (Dino, 1999)
