= Expeditie Robinson 2017 =

- Season 18
- No. of days: 32
- No. of castaways: 19
- Winner: Carlos Platier Luna
- Runners-up: Kaj Gorgels; Soundos El Ahmadi
- Location: Caramoan, Philippines

Release
- Original release: 7 September – 21 December 2017

Season chronology
- ← Previous; 2016 Next → 2018

Expeditie Robinson 2017 was the eighteenth season of the popular Dutch version of Swedish reality television series Expedition Robinson.

For the first time since 2009, four undiscovered Dutch citizens competed alongside fifteen celebrities. The four started on the Island of the Unknowns and took part in duels to enter the game. Also, after the teams are divided, the person who reached the end last would not be put on a tribe and be sent to the Island of the Unknowns. Also, for the first time in the series' history, a father and daughter (Richard and Joëlle Witschge) competed alongside each other in the season.

The competition was won by Carlos Platier Luna.

== Finishing order ==
Contestant	Original Tribe	Swapped Tribe	Merged Tribe	Voted Out	Island of the Unknowns	Finish
Jorik "Lil' Kleine" Scholten; 22, Rapper	South Team			1st Voted Out; Day 3		19th Day 3
Eddy "Brace" Macdonald; 30, Singer	South Team			Medically evacuated Day 5		18th Day 5
Nicole Buch-van Houten; 50, Television Producer/Presenter	North Team			2nd Voted Out; Day 7		17th Day 7
Henk Poort; 61, Opera Singer/Actor	North Team	South Team		3rd Voted Out; Day 9		16th Day 9
Joëlle Witschge; 25, Model; Richard's daughter	North Team	South Team		4th Voted Out; Day 12		15th Day 12
Richard Witschge; 47, Former Footballer; Joëlle's father	North Team	North Team		5th Voted Out; Day 15		14th Day 15
Carolina Dijkhuizen; 36, Singer	Unknowns	Unknowns		Lost Challenge; Day 1	Lost Duel; Day 16	13th Day 16
Soundos El Ahmadi; Returned to Game	South Team	Unknowns		Not Picked; Day 8	Won Duel; Day 16	
Marlé Janssen; 54, Houten	Unknowns	Unknowns			Lost Duel; Day 17	12th Day 17
Marieke Elsinga; 31, Television Presenter	South Team	North Team	Catanawan	6th Voted Out; Day 18		11th Day 18
Anouk Hoogendijk; 31, Footballer	North Team	North Team	Catanawan	7th Voted Out; Day 21		10th Day 21
Imke Wieffer; 25, Enschede	Unknowns	South Team	Catanawan	8th Voted Out; Day 23	Won Duel; Day 9	9th Day 23
Danny Froger; 29, Singer	South Team	South Team	Catanawan	9th Voted Out; Day 26		8th Day 26
Herold Dat; 45, Asten	Unknowns	North Team	Catanawan	10th Voted Out; Day 28	Won Duel; Day 15	7th Day 28
Roeland Fernhout; 45, Actor	North Team	North Team	Catanawan	11th Voted Out; Day 30		6th Day 30
Niels Gomperts; 26, Actor	North Team	North Team	Catanawan	Lost Challenge; Day 31		5th Day 31
Shelly Sterk; 26, Television Presenter	South Team	South Team	Catanawan	Lost Challenge; Day 31		4th Day 31
Soundos El Ahmadi; 35, Actress/Comedian	South Team	Unknowns	Catanawan	2nd Runner-up; Day 32		3rd Day 32
Kaj Gorgels; 26, YouTube Vlogger	South Team	South Team	Catanawan	Runner-up; Day 32		2nd Day 32
Carlos Platier Luna; 23, Oldenzaal	Unknowns	South Team	Catanawan	Robinson; Day 32	Won Duel; Day 12	1st Day 32

== Future appearances ==
Niels Gomperts and Carlos Platier Luna returned to compete in Expeditie Robinson: All Stars.
