= Expeditie Robinson 2010 =

- Season 12
- Presented by: Evi Hanssen; Eddy Zoëy
- No. of days: 28
- No. of castaways: 16
- Winner: Regina Romeijn
- Runner-up: Tatiana Silva
- Location: Malaysia
- No. of episodes: 14

Release
- Original network: 2BE; RTL 5
- Original release: September 2 – December 2, 2010

Season chronology
- ← Previous; 2009 Next → 2011

Expeditie Robinson 2010 was the twelfth season of the RTL 5 and 2BE reality television series Expeditie Robinson first aired on September 2, 2010. It was the second season hosted by Evi Hanssen and Eddy Zoëy.

This season included celebrities only.

== Survivors ==
Contestants	Episodes														Finish	Total votes	Final council
Contestants	01	02	03	04	05	06	07	08	09	10	11	12	13	14	Finish	Total votes	Final council
Regina Romeijn; 33, TV host from the Netherlands															Winner	3	4 votes
Tatiana Silva; 25, Miss Belgium in 2005															Runner-up	15	2 votes
Saar Koningsberger; 23, VJ for TMF from the Netherlands															Lost Semi Final; 3rd	5	Regina
Sebastiaan Labrie; 39, actor and TV host from the Netherlands															Lost Semi Final; 4th	3	Regina
Zsofi Horvath; 30, Miss Belgian Beauty in 2003															Eliminated; 5th	3	Tatiana
Antony Arandia; 24, actor from Belgium															Eliminated; 6th	6	Tatiana
Martine Prenen; 46, TV host from Belgium															Eliminated; 7th	13	Regina
Sugar Jackson; 29, welterweight boxer from Belgium															Eliminated; 8th	10	Regina
Iwein Segers; 30, comedian from Belgium															Eliminated; 9th	4	
John van Lottum; 34, former tennis player from the Netherlands															Voluntarily; 10th	1	
Dennis Weening; 33, TV host from the Netherlands															Voluntarily; 11th	0	
Nienke Römer; 34, actress from the Netherlands															5th Voted Out; 12th	4	
Maxim Hartman; 46, TV host from the Netherlands															4th Voted Out; 13th	6	
Sergio Quisquater; 45, singer from Belgium															3rd Voted Out; 14th	5	
Kim Feenstra; 23, fashion model from the Netherlands															2nd Voted Out; 15th	4	
Frans Frederiks; 29, rapper from the Netherlands															1st Voted Out; 16th	5	
Stephanie Clerckx; 26, fashion model from Belgium															Voluntarily; 17th	0	

Kamp Noord
Kamp Zuid
Geheim Kamp
Langun
Gaya

== Future appearances ==
Saar Koningsberger returned to compete in Expeditie Robinson 2021. Sebastiaan Labrie returned to compete in Expeditie Robinson: All Stars.
