= Expeditie Robinson 2012 =

- Season 14
- No. of episodes: 16

Release
- Original network: 2BE; RTL 5
- Original release: August 30 – December 13, 2012

Season chronology
- ← Previous; 2011 Next → 2013

Expeditie Robinson 2012 was the fourteenth season of the RTL 5 and 2BE reality television series Expeditie Robinson first aired on August 30, 2012. It was the seventh season hosted by Evi Hanssen and the first season hosted by Dennis Weening, contestant of Expeditie Robinson 2010.

== Survivors ==
Contestants	Episodes																Finish	Total votes
Contestants	01	02	03	04	05	06	07	08	09	10	11	12	13	14	15	16	Finish	Total votes
Fatima Moreira de Melo; 34, Olympic field hockey player from the Netherlands																	Robinson	0
Peggy Vrijens; 35, actress from the Netherlands																	Runner-Up	8
Fajah Lourens; 31, actress from the Netherlands																	Runner-Up	12
Christophe De Meulder; 24, professional poker player from Belgium																	Runner-Up	1
Gene Thomas; 39, singer from Belgium																	Voted Out 5th 5th	5^{1}
Joke Van de Velde; 32, Miss Belgium 2000																	Voted Out 4th 6th	4
Min Hee Bervoets; 26, dance choreographer from Belgium																	Voted Out 3rd 7th	8
Ruud Feltkamp; 22, actor from the Netherlands																	Voted Out 2nd 8th	11
Paul Turner; 26, singer from the Netherlands																	Quit voluntarily 9th	1^{2}
Matthias De Meulder; 24, professional poker player from Belgium																	Voted Out 1st 10th	4
Tess Milne; 24, TV host from the Netherlands																	Eliminated; 11th	9^{3}
Lodewijk Hoekstra; 35, TV hoster from the Netherlands																	Eliminated; 12th	4
Zoë Van Gastel; 34, fashion model from Belgium																	Eliminated; 13th	11^{4}
Aagje Vanwalleghem; 24, Olympic gymnast from Belgium																	Quit voluntarily 14th	0
Olivier Bisback; 38, stuntman from Belgium																	Eliminated; 15th	2
Willie Wartaal; 30, rapper from the Netherlands																	Eliminated; 16th	4

Kamp Noord
Kamp Zuid
Mangrove
Samensmelting (Kador)
Winnaarseiland

- ^1 Originally, Gene received one vote at the ninth council and four votes at the fourteenth council, but undid two votes by two immunity coins.
- ^2 Originally, Paul had two black votes at the ninth council, but undid one vote by one immunity coin.
- ^3 Originally, Tess received four votes at the third council, but undid two votes by two immunity coin.
- ^4 Originally, Zoë received four votes at the first council, but undid one vote by one immunity coin.
