= Expeditie Robinson 2016 =

- Season 17
- No. of castaways: 16
- Winner: Bertie Steur
- Runners-up: Diorno "Dio" Braaf; Thomas Dekker
- Location: Caramoan, Philippines

Release
- Original release: September 8 – December 22, 2016

Season chronology
- ← Previous; 2015 Next → 2017

Expeditie Robinson 2016 is the seventeenth season of the Dutch version of the Swedish television series Expeditie Robinson. This season premiered on September 8, 2016. The main twist season is that both tribes are staying on the same island.

== Finishing order ==
Contestant	Original tribes	Mixed tribes	Merged tribe	Finish	Dropouts Island
Elle van Rijn; 49, Actress	North Team			2nd Voted Out; Day 5	Quit; Day 11
Kraantje Pappie; 30, Rapper	North Team	North Team		Quit; Day 12	
Bartho Braat; 65, Actor	North Team	South Team		4th Voted Out; Day 10	Lost Duel; Day 15
Chloe Leenheer; 27, Actress	South Team	North Team		Lost Challenge; Day 16	
Lex Uiting; 30, Television Presenter	North Team	South Team		3rd Voted Out; Day 7	Lost Duel; Day 16
Dave Roelvink; 22, DJ	South Team	South Team	Base Camp	6th Voted Out; Day 18	Refused Duel; Day 18
Gaby Blaaser; 30, Actress	South Team	South Team	Base Camp	Quit; Day 18	
Jalou Langeree; 26, Kite Surfer	South Team	North Team	Base Camp	7th Voted Out; Day 21	Lost Duel; Day 22
Koos van Plateringen; 42, Television Presenter	South Team	North Team	Base Camp	8th Voted Out; Day 26	Refused Duel; Day 26
JayJay Boske; 30, Former Rugby Player	South Team	North Team		5th Voted Out; Day 12	Lost Duel; Day 29
Jessie Jazz Vuijk; 21, Model	North Team	North Team	Base Camp	10th Voted Out; Day 30	Lost Duel; Day 30
Bertie Steur; Returned to game	North Team			1st Voted Out; Day 2	Won Challenge; Day 31
Thomas Dekker; Returned to game	North Team	South Team	Base Camp	9th Voted Out; Day 28	Won Challenge; Day 31
Suzanne Klemann; 53, Singer	South Team	North Team	Base Camp	Lost Challenge; Day 31	
Anna Nooshin; 29, Fashion Blogger	North Team	South Team	Base Camp	Lost Challenge; Day 31	
Thomas Dekker; 32, Former Cyclist	North Team	South Team	Base Camp	2nd Runner-Up; Day 32	
Diorno "Dio" Braaf; 28, Rapper	South Team	South Team	Base Camp	Runner-Up; Day 32	
Bertie Steur; 42, Farmer	North Team		Base Camp	Robinson; Day 32	

== Future appearances ==
JayJay Boske returned to compete in Expeditie Robinson 2021. Thomas Dekker, Diorno "Dio" Braaf and Bertie Steur later returned to compete in Expeditie Robinson: All Stars.
