= Expeditie Robinson 2009 =

- Season 11
- Presented by: Evi Hanssen; Eddy Zoëy
- No. of days: 47
- No. of castaways: 21
- Winner: Marcel Vandezande
- Runner-up: Rita Berger
- No. of episodes: 14

Release
- Original network: RTL 5; 2BE
- Original release: September 3 – December 3, 2009

Season chronology
- ← Previous; 2008 Next → 2010

Expeditie Robinson 2009 is the eleventh season of the RTL 5 and 2BE reality television series Expeditie Robinson scheduled to be first aired on September 3, 2009. It's the first season hosted by Evi Hanssen and Eddy Zoëy, since Ernst-Paul Hasselbach's death in October 2008.

This season started off with only female contestants. While, the male contestants had to survive the jungle before entering the expedition.

== Survivors ==
Contestants	Episodes														Finish	Total votes	Final council
Contestants	01	02	03	04	05	06	07	08	09	10	11	12	13	14	Finish	Total votes	Final council
Marcel Johan Vandezande; 53, Santa Lucía de Tirajana, Spain															Winner; 1st	5	5 votes
Rita Berger; 32, Breda, Netherlands															Runner-up; 2nd	15	2 votes
Marina Harvent; 46, Hoboken, Belgium															Runner-up; 3rd	2	0 votes
Jeroen Schuurman; 39, Zwolle, Netherlands															Lost Semi Final; 4th	16	Marcel
Dennis Hogendoorn; 35, Rotterdam, Netherlands															Lost Semi Final; 5th	4	Marcel
Esmeralda Izeboud; 38, Bergen op Zoom, Netherlands															Eliminated; 6th	4	Rita
Kurt Vroman; 44, Marke, Belgium															Eliminated; 7th	12	Marcel
Marjolein Cornet; 26, Amsterdam, Netherlands															Eliminated; 8th	16	Marcel
Igor Vermeulen; 38, Utrecht, Netherlands															Eliminated; 9th	6	Marcel
Simone Katrisiotis; 40, Wageningen, Netherlands															Eliminated; 10th	7	Rita
Yolanda Koelhof; 29, Rotterdam, Netherlands															Eliminated; 11th	3	
Jill Stevens; 20, Astene, Belgium															Eliminated; 12th	0	
Eva Gollner; 26, Herentals, Belgium															Eliminated; 13th	1	
Sabine Rogghé; 35, Keerbergen, Belgium															4th Voted Out; 14th	9	
Esther Moret; 29, Krimpen aan den IJssel, Netherlands															3rd Voted Out; 15th	7	
Carolien Van De Steen; 27, Waasmunster, Belgium															2nd Voted Out; 16th	7	
Carine Hassalt; 40, Brussels, Belgium															Voluntarily; 17th	3	
Birgit Aarsman; 20, Zwanenburg, Netherlands															Voluntarily; 18th	1	
Doreen Bratescu; 22, Antwerp, Belgium															Removed; 19th	2	
Lianne Langkamp; 25, Nijmegen, Netherlands															1st Voted Out; 20th	5	
Bea Uvin; 31, Brussels, Belgium															1st Eliminated; 21st	2	

Kamp Noord
Kamp Zuid
Junglemissie
Samensmelting

== Future appearances ==
Rita Berger returned to compete in Expeditie Robinson: All Stars.
