= Mariana Verkerk =

Dutch-American model

Mariana Verkerk is a Dutch–American model, runway coach, television personality, businesswoman and commercial producer. She has walked the runway for various designers, such as Michael Kors, Nicole Miller and Thierry Mugler. Since 2005, Verkerk has served as a judge and runway coach on the TV shows Scandinavia's Next Top Model, Norway's Next Top Model (cycle 7), Benelux' Next Top Model, and Holland's Next Top Model.

== Early life and discovery ==
Mariana Verkerk was born in 1960 and raised in Schiedam, a city outside of Rotterdam, The Netherlands. She started working for an American shipping company at the age of 16. Verkerk started modeling at age 21 after being convinced to go to New York City by a fashion journalist.

As soon as she arrived in New York City, she met with numerous agencies. All of them rejected her, claiming that she was too old – she was 21 at the time. Verkerk returned to the Netherlands, and then traveled back to New York a few months later. Her career took off after a young fashion designer asked her to walk the runway for him.

== Career ==
=== Modeling ===
After signing with Elite Model Management, Verkerk worked with supermodels such as Naomi Campbell, Kate Moss, and Tyra Banks.

As a model, Verkerk travelled all over the world to walk fashion shows for Michael Kors, Nicole Miller, Thierry Mugler, Carolina Herrera, Bill Blass, Victoria's Secret, Bogner, Maidenform, Escada, Gloria Vanderbilt, Paloma Picasso, Halston, Zang Toi, Akris, and Anne Cole.

Verkerk has appeared on the cover and inside pages of Elle, Vogue, Harper's Bazaar, Paper, and Forbes.

=== Coaching ===
In 1983, Elite Model Management started Elite Model Look, an annual event to discover new female fashion models. In 1990, Verkerk was asked to prepare the new fashion talents for the runway.

Verkerk became a runway coach for Model Search America (now Mogull Talent), which at the time was one of the largest scouting companies in the US. During the course of ten years, she attended conventions and gave motivational speeches across the country.

=== Television ===
In 2005, Verkerk became the Posing Coach and a jury member for Scandinavia's Next Top Model, and later for Norway's Next Top Model, Benelux Next Top Model, and Holland's Next Top Model. During that time, she also appeared in other Dutch programs such as Atlas and Jouw vrouw/Mijn vrouw VIPS.

=== Expeditie Robinson a.k.a. Dutch Survivor ===
Verkerk joined the show for the 20th anniversary, which took place in the Philippines in 2019. In 2022, Verkerk competed in the All-Star edition of Expeditie Robinson which aired in the spring of 2022. Verkerk was a semi-finalist in both seasons.

== The Model Convention ==
After Verkerk's role as a judge and coach in Holland's Next Top Model, she became known as "Queen of the Catwalk" in the Netherlands and received hundreds of messages a day from boys and girls who wanted to become a model. This led to the founding of the Model Convention. The convention takes place annually at the Huishoudbeurs in Amsterdam and convenes agencies such as Women, Wilhelmina, Ford Models USA, Donna Models Tokyo, Storm London, to scout undiscovered aspiring models.

== Producing ==
Since 2009, Verkerk produces and choreographs fashion shows all over the world. Her contributions across the globe include China Fashion Week, New York Fashion Week, Los Angeles Fashion Week and Amsterdam Fashion Week. Verkerk has also produced commercials for brands like McDonald's, FBTO, Rabobank, and Marie Stella Maris. Furthermore, Verkerk was responsible for the U.S. production of American singer-songwriter Matt Simons' music video for the song "Catch & Release".
