= Ferry Doedens =

Dutch actor

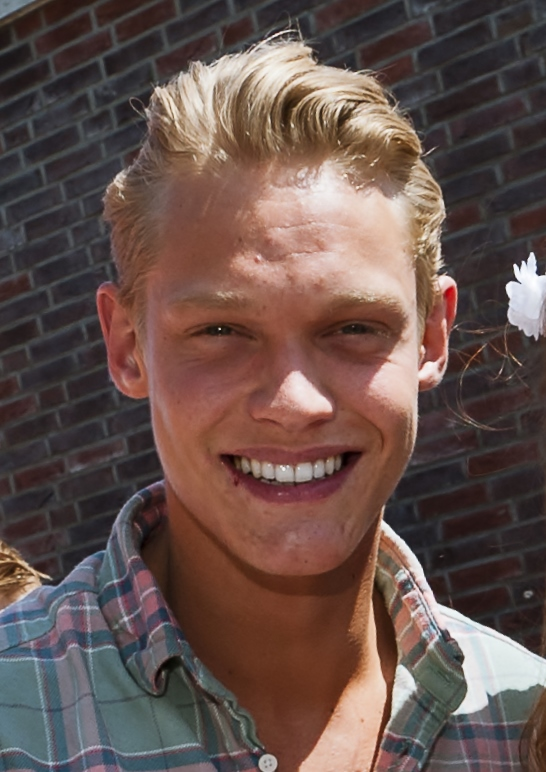
- Doedens in 2012
- Born: 17 June 1990 (age 35); Drachten, Friesland, Netherlands
- Occupations: actor; model; singer; presenter
- Years active: 2007-present
- Height: 1.9 m (6 ft 3 in)
- Website: http://www.ferry-doedens.com

Ferry Doedens (born 17 June 1990) is a Dutch actor, model, singer and presenter. He became known to the general public in the Netherlands from the role of Lucas Sanders in the soap operas Goede tijden, slechte tijden and Nieuwe Tijden. He has also ventured in singing, taking part in Idols IV. In 2026, a documentary titled Ferry Lost followed him through his problem with drug abuse and gambling addiction.

== Biography ==
In February 2026, the documentary Ferry Lost appeared on the streaming platform Prime Video, in which Doedens was followed two years while he struggles with drug problems and gambling addiction.

== Private life ==
Doedens has had two relationships which were made known to the public. He dated Nuno for six years but the two broke up at the beginning of 2019. According to him, the two decided to break up in good terms and remained good friends after. Following Nuno, Doedens dated Brazilian Raphael. However, the two broke up due to huge differences during the COVID-19 pandemic. During the Pride-related Open Kaart podcast, titled Open Kast with YouTuber Robbert Rodenburg, Doedens revealed how their relationship was toxic, as the two would often argue and yell at each other even on the street and then spend a lot of time having excessive sex with each other.
