= Nicolette Kluijver =

Dutch television presenter and model

Nicolette Staudt-Kluijver
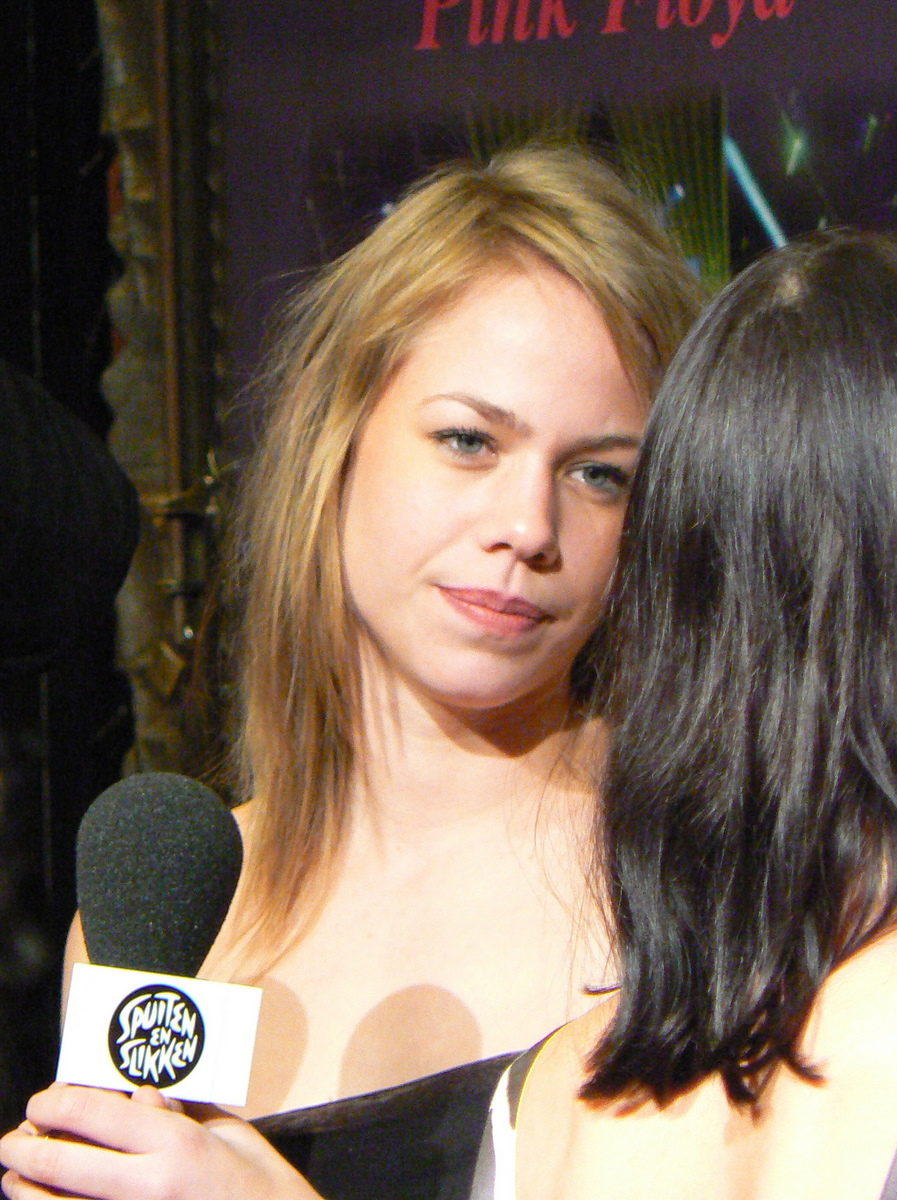
- Kluijver in 2008
- Born: 29 September 1984 (age 40); Hilversum, Netherlands
- Occupation(s): television presenter, model

Nicolette Rianne Staudt-Kluijver (born 29 September 1984) is a Dutch television presenter and former model. As of 2014 she works for RTL 5 (presenting the nude dating show, Adam Zkt. Eva), after spending many years at BNN.

When she was 17, she was discovered by a modelling agency and she worked for Diesel (brand), Tommy Hilfiger and G-Star After three years, she auditioned for 6pack, a Dutch television program, which she hosted two years.

In 2006, she joined the Dutch broadcasting company BNN, co-presenting the program Spuiten en Slikken in which Dutch celebrities are interviewed about drug use and sexual practices. She is one of the eight presenters of Try Before You Die.

== Programs ==
As presenter

- SBS / MTV: 6pack Season 4 and 5
- BNN: Try Before You Die Season 3,4 and 5 (Since 2007)
- BNN: Spuiten and Slikken Season 3,4,5,6,7,8 and 9 (Since 2006)
- BNN: Spuiten and Slikken Travel
- BNN: Spuiten and Slikken Summertour (2008 en 2009)
- BNN: Main Host: Spuiten and Slikken (Since Nov. 2009)
- RTL 4: Een goed stel hersens

As candidate/guest

- Ranking the Stars (Nederland) 2008
- JENSEN! 2007 en 2008
- Wie is... de Mol? 2008
- Waar is de Mol? 2009 - with host Johnny de Mol to Indonesia. (Season 3, ep.3)
