= 2023 in the Netherlands =

- Decades: 2000s; 2010s; 2020s
- See also: Other events of 2023; History of the Netherlands

Events from the year 2023 in the Netherlands.

== Incumbents ==
- Monarch: Willem-Alexander
- Prime Minister: Mark Rutte
- Speaker of the House of Representatives: Vera Bergkamp (until 14 December); Martin Bosma (starting 14 December)
- President of the Senate: Jan Anthonie Bruijn

== Events ==
- 15 March –
  - 2023 Dutch provincial elections
  - 2023 Dutch water board elections
  - 2023 Dutch electoral college elections
  - 2023 Dutch island council elections
- 4 April – 2023 Voorschoten train crash: One person is killed and 50 others are injured, nineteen of them hospitalized, when a train derails in Voorschoten, South Holland.
- 30 May – 2023 Dutch Senate election
- 1 July - The Future Pensions Act comes into law.
- 7 July – Dutch cabinet collapses because of disagreement over migration law.
- 10 July – Prime Minister Mark Rutte announces his retirement from politics following the collapse of his cabinet.
- 16 August – The Netherlands' statistics office reports the country has entered a recession after the economy declined by 0.3% in the second quarter with exports and household spending falling despite rising interest rates intended to lower inflation.
- 28 September:
  - 2023 Rotterdam shootings: Three people are killed in shootings and arson attacks at a teaching hospital and a nearby private home in Rotterdam.
  - A bluetongue disease outbreak in the Netherlands has spread to 319 sheep and cattle farming companies.
- 3 October – Former army officer Pierre-Claver Karangwa is arrested in the Netherlands for his role in the genocide in Mugina, Rwanda, where, in April 1994, thousands of people were killed.
- 15 October – Protesters in Amsterdam call on the EU to take a stand against Israel's bombardment of Gaza, condemning European leaders for their silence on the violence Israel is committing in Gaza.
- 18 October – Dutch serial killer Joran van der Sloot confesses in a U.S. federal court that he killed Natalee Holloway.
- 23 October – A new species of prehistoric millipedes named Lauravolsella willemeni is discovered in the Netherlands, of a new genus named Lauravolsella.
- 22 November – 2023 Dutch general election

== Deaths ==
- 1 January - Bob Jongen, 95, footballer
- 4 January - Manfred Krikke, 90, cycling team manager
- 8 January - Sietse Bosgra, 87, political activist
- 9 January - Simone Kramer, 83, author
- 12 January - Toos Grol-Overling, 91, politician
- 14 January - Lieuwe Westra, 40, cyclist
- 15 January - Jan Krol, 60, actor
- 15 January - Piet van Heusden, 93, cyclist
- 15 January - Fons Panis, 90, mayor
- 17 January - Cornelius Rogge, 90, artist
- 19 January - Rudy Englebert, 72, bassist
- 20 January - Arno van der Heyden, 61, comedian and actor
- 22 January - Lenie de Nijs, 83, swimmer
- 23 January - Peter Maas, 69, mayor
- 1 February - Hans Sleven, 86, footballer
- 4 February - Geert-Jan Laan, 79, journalist
- 6 February - Ger Thijs, 74, actor and director
- 9 February - Marijke Merckens, 83, actress
- 7 March - Harry de Winter, 73, television producer and presenter, mesothelioma.
- 4 May - Joop van den Berg, 81, politician, MP (1988–1994).
- 12 June - Meindert Fennema, 77, political scientist.
- 13 June - Stef Tijs, 86, mathematician and game theorist.
- 18 June - Jellie Brouwer, 59, journalist and radio presenter, cancer.
- 23 June - Willem Nijholt, 88, actor (Ciske de Rat, Havinck, Under the Palms) and singer.
- 29 June - Jan Stekelenburg, 81, television presenter.
- 30 June - Ruud Bos, 87, composer, pianist and orchestra leader.
- 1 July - Dilano van 't Hoff, 18, racing driver, race collision.
- 2 July - Theo Pahlplatz, 76, footballer (Twente, national team).
- 4 July - Jan Sierhuis, 94, painter.
- 5 July - Rob Agerbeek, 85, pianist.
- 10 July - Marga Minco, 103, journalist and writer.
- 15 July - Leonard Retel Helmrich, 63, cinematographer, film director and screenwriter (Eye of the Day, Shape of the Moon, Position Among the Stars).
- 20 July - Theo Smit, 72, racing cyclist.
- 27 July - Margriet Heymans, 90, writer and illustrator.
- 3 August - Bram Moolenaar, 61–62, computer programmer (Vim).
- 9 August - Harrij Notenboom, 96, politician, MP (1963–1979) and MEP (1971–1984).
- 12 August - Henk Tiesinga, 73–74, politician, senator (2009–2011).
- 13 August - Theo Meijer, 76, politician, MP (1996–2003).
- 19 August - Tineke Beishuizen, 84, author, lyricist and columnist.
- 22 August - Mathilde van den Brink, 82, politician, MEP (1989–1994).
- 22 August - Chrisje Comvalius, 75, actress (In Oranje, Off Screen, Achtste Groepers Huilen Niet).
- 25 August - Rob Fruithof, 71, actor and television presenter.
- 31 August - Jan Jongbloed, 82, footballer (DWS, Amsterdam, national team).
- 31 August - Clairy Polak, 67, journalist and radio and television presenter.
- 16 September - Wimie Wilhelm, 62, actress (Baantjer).
- 17 September - Louis Gooren, 79, endocrinologist.
- 20 September - Erwin Olaf, 64, photographer, complications from a lung transplant and emphysema.
- 24 September - Reiky de Valk, 23, actor (Skam NL, Hunter Street).
- 25 September - Anneke Uittenbosch, 93, harpsichordist.
- 26 September - Klaas Hofstra, 79, actor (De Schippers van de Kameleon).
- 6 October - Ronnie Boomgaard, 78, footballer (Ajax, HFC Haarlem, Blauw Wit).
- 7 October - Tjerk Westerterp, 92, politician, four-time MP, minister of transport and water management (1973–1977), and MEP (1967–1971).
- 16 October - Toon Greebe, 35, darts player.
- 17 October - Kalle Oranen, 77, footballer (Sportclub Enschede, Twente, SC Heracles).
- 4 November - Hans Melchers, 85, businessman.
- 6 November - Berend-Jan van Voorst tot Voorst, 79, politician, Queen's commissioner of Limburg (1993–2005), state secretary for defence (1989–1993) and foreign affairs (1988–1989).
- 7 November - Roel Luynenburg, 78, rower, Olympic bronze medalist (1972). (death announced on this date)
- 8 November - Frank Houben, 84, politician, Queen's commissioner of North Brabant (1987–2003).
- 9 November - Fred van Dorp, 85, Olympic water polo player (1960, 1964, 1968).
- 14 November - Karel van de Graaf, 72, journalist and television presenter.
- 17 November - Ellen Jens, 83, television producer (De Fred Haché Show, We zijn weer thuis) and director.
- 18 November - Ruud Geels, 75, footballer (Ajax, Feyenoord, national team).
- 18 November - Rob Kerkhoven, 86, Olympic swimming coach (1968). (death announced on this date)
- 19 November - Wim van der Leegte, 76, businessman (VDL Groep) and billionaire.
- 20 November - Jan Westdorp, 89, racing cyclist.
- 23 November - Harald Hasselbach, 56, football player (Calgary Stampeders, Denver Broncos), Super Bowl champion (1997, 1998), mucinous adenocarcinoma.
- 23 November - Helmert Woudenberg, 78, actor (Max Havelaar, In for Treatment, Amsterdamned), stage director and playwright.
- 1 December - Burny Bos, 79, film producer (Miss Minoes, Mijn Franse tante Gazeuse), scenarist and children's book writer, mesothelomia.
- 3 December - Peter d'Hamecourt, 77, journalist (NOS Journaal, VRT).
- 6 December - Cilly Dartell, 66, television presenter (Hart van Nederland) and actress.
- 13 December - Paul Litjens, 76, Olympic field hockey player (1972, 1976).
- 13 December - Dick Tommel, 81, politician, MP (1981–1994).
- 14 December - Ernst Jansen Steur, 78, neurologist, pneumonia. (death announced on this date)
- 16 December - Bert Peletier, 86, mathematician.
- 16 December - Mathieu Segers, 47, historian, colorectal cancer.
- 17 December - Linda van Dyck, 75, actress (10:32, A Gangstergirl, De grens).
- 20 December - Harrie Smeets, 63, Roman Catholic prelate, bishop of Roermond (2018–2023), brain tumour.
- 28 December - Beno Hofman, 69, historian and television presenter, pancreatic cancer.
