= 2023 in Dutch television =

This is a list of events that took place in 2023 related to television in the Netherlands.

== Events ==
- 11 March – Journalist Daniël Verlaan wins the 23rd season of Wie is de Mol?.
- 1 April – Bart Vandenbroeck wins Big Brother 2023, the third cooperation season of the Dutch and Belgian version of Big Brother.
- 5 May – Chahid Charrak, Billy Dans and Noor Omrani win the third season of De Verraders.
- 7 May – Jeroen van der Boom wins the third season of the drag queen show Make Up Your Mind.
- 9 May – Mia Nicolai and Dion Cooper represent the Netherlands in the semi-final of the Eurovision Song Contest 2023. They did not advance to represent the Netherlands in the final.
- 8 September – Journalist Tom Kleijn wins the 22nd season of De slimste mens.
- 26 November – Sep and Jasmijn represent the Netherlands at the Junior Eurovision Song Contest 2023 held in Nice, France.
- 17 December – Willem Voogd wins Expeditie Robinson 2023.
- 31 December – Simone Kleinsma wins the fifth season of The Masked Singer.

== Debuts ==
- 12 January – DNA Singers, game show presented by Art Rooijakkers in which relatives of multiple Dutch singers sing a song and two teams have to guess who the person is related to
- 19 March – Arcadia, Belgian-Dutch science fiction television series
- 8 April – Alles is Muziek, game show presented by Marieke Elsinga
- 12 April – Dag & nacht, medical drama television series
- 26 April – Ruud & Olcay in voor- en tegenspoed, reality series with Ruud de Wild and Olcay Gulsen
- 12 May – Het Onbekende, adventure show presented by Renze Klamer
- 18 May – Bij Ons Op De Boerderij, reality television series
- 23 May – De Moeite Waard?!, show presented by Tijl Beckand which follows people attempting to flip a house
- 26 May – Anoniem, crime television series directed by Diederik van Rooijen
- 27 May – Zing!, singing talent show
- 5 June – Marcel & Gijs, talk show hosted by Gijs Groenteman and Marcel van Roosmalen
- 24 June – De Kwis met Ballen, quiz show presented by Johnny de Mol
- 2 July – Ik ga op reis en neem mee, travel dating show
- 2 July – De Prins met het Witte Haar, dating show for elderly people presented by Dennis van der Geest
- 3 July – Lettrix, game show presented by Patrick Martens and Dyantha Brooks
- 8 July – The Talent Scouts, singing talent competition, considered to be the successor to The Voice of Holland.
- 14 July – Bergafwaarts, competition game show presented by Jay-Jay Boske and Moïse Trustfull
- 27 July – Blablabla met Schaap, show about Dutch language dialects presented by Elise Schaap
- 7 August – Waar Gaat Het Over?, quiz show presented by Tijl Beckand
- 9 August – Lucas en Arthur Jussen op Wereldtournee, three-part documentary series presented by Ivo Niehe about piano duo Lucas and Arthur Jussen
- 26 August – De bouw maakt het, television show about construction presented by Daan Nieber
- 28 August – Date Smakelijk, dating show presented by Georgina Verbaan and Patrick Martens
- 28 August – In de TBS, five-part documentary series presented by Hans Faber
- 29 August – Samen Uit, Samen Thuis?, travel dating show
- 30 August – De Broeders Van Rossem, show presented by Maarten van Rossem and his brother Vincent van Rossem
- 30 August – Jelka Op Eigen Houtje, show presented by Jelka van Houten
- 30 August – De Beul van Twente, three-part crime series about crimes committed by the "Beul van Twente" Rudolf K.
- 1 September – Het Jaar van..., show in which celebrities look back on a particular year
- 2 September – 12 Straten Groen, show presented by Anita Witzier
- 2 September – Langs de IJssel, television show presented by Huub Stapel about life along the IJssel river
- 3 September – You Never Walk Alone, walking television show presented by Jamie Trenité
- 11 September – Volendam, een dorp in de Eredivisie, six-part documentary series about FC Volendam and Jan Smit
- 14 September – Restaurant van de toekomst, food television show presented by Sosha Duysker and Anna Gimbrère
- 14 September – Stagiairs, show which follows people doing an internship in Curaçao
- 14 September – The Big Bang, game show presented by Staf and Mathias Coppens
- 23 September – Hotel Hollandia, show presented by Paul de Leeuw
- 23 September – Sketch Studio, children's drawing competition presented by Soy Kroon
- 14 October – Eén Grote Familie, drama television series
- 19 October – Waar is mijn erfenis?, show about inheritance presented by Dennis van der Geest
- 22 October – De Bondgenoten, reality television series
- 28 October – Bouwer Power, children's show about construction presented by Soy Kroon
- 30 October – Leven Zonder Letters, show about functional illiteracy presented by Frans Bauer
- 6 November – Kopen Of Slopen, television show presented by Caroline Tensen about buying a new home or renovating one's current home
- 12 December – That's My Jam, music game show presented by Quinty Misiedjan
- 16 December – Moordfeest, murder detective game show hosted by Hans Kesting

== Ending this year ==
End date	Show	Channel	First aired	Status	Source
7 April	HLF8	SBS6	2021	Ended	
13 May	Alles is Muziek	RTL 4	2023	Cancelled	
31 May	Ruud & Olcay in voor- en tegenspoed	NPO 1	2023	Ended	
10 August	Blablabla met Schaap	RTL 4	2023	Ended	

== Deaths ==
- 15 January – Jan Krol, actor
- 23 January – Ghislaine Pierie, actress, film director, and stage director (Baantjer, Moordvrouw, SpangaS)
- 9 February – Marijke Merckens, actress
- 7 March – Harry de Winter, television producer and presenter
- 21 March – Fred Florusse, actor
- 27 March – Wim de Bie, comedian (Van Kooten en De Bie)
- 29 June – Jan Stekelenburg, television presenter (Studio Sport)
- 22 August – Chrisje Comvalius, actress (Goede tijden, slechte tijden)
- 31 August – Clairy Polak, journalist and radio and television presenter.
- 16 September - Wimie Wilhelm, 62, actress (Baantjer).
- 24 September - Reiky de Valk, 23, actor (Skam NL, Hunter Street).
- 26 September - Klaas Hofstra, 79, actor (De Schippers van de Kameleon).
- 14 November - Karel van de Graaf, 72, journalist and television presenter.
- 17 November - Ellen Jens, 83, television producer (De Fred Haché Show, We zijn weer thuis) and director.
- 1 December - Burny Bos, 79, film producer (Miss Minoes, Mijn Franse tante Gazeuse), scenarist and children's book writer, mesothelomia.
- 6 December - Cilly Dartell, 66, television presenter (Hart van Nederland) and actress.
- 17 December - Linda van Dyck, 75, actress (10:32, A Gangstergirl, De grens).

== See also ==
- 2023 in the Netherlands
