= Rosana Lanzelotte =

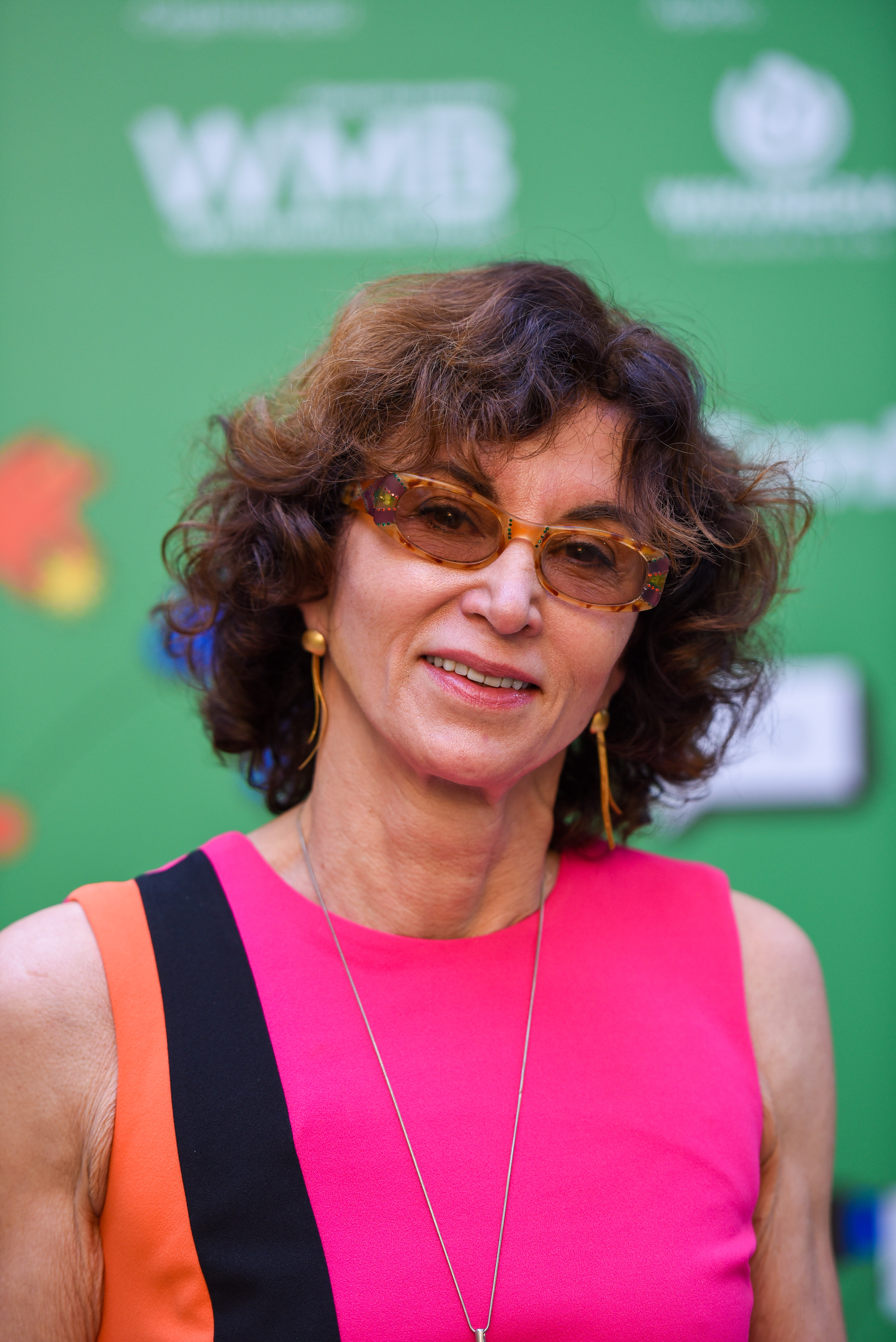
- Rosana Lanzelotte in July 2022, during WikiCon Brazil.

Background information
- Born: Rosana de Saldanha da Gama Lanzelotte; June 23, 1961 (age 65); Rio de Janeiro, Brazil
- Genre: Chamber music
- Occupations: Harpsichordist, teacher and researcher
- Instrument: Harpsichord
- Label: Biscoito Fino · Paulus Editora · Eldorado · Vozes
- Website: lanzelotte.com

Rosana de Saldanha da Gama Lanzelotte (born June 23, 1961) is a Brazilian harpsichordist and researcher. She is considered one of the leading harpsichordists in the country, having been awarded the "Golden Dolphin" by the Rio de Janeiro State Council of Culture in recognition of her efforts to promote culture. She received the Chevalier of the Order of Arts and Letters from the French government. In addition to having a degree in piano from the Federal University of Rio de Janeiro (UFRJ) and a postgraduate degree from the Royal Conservatory of The Hague, in the Netherlands, under the guidance of Jacques Ogg. Rosana also has a degree in electrical engineering and a master's and doctorate in computer science, both degrees from the Pontifical Catholic University of Rio de Janeiro (PUC-Rio).

== Biography ==
Rosana Lanzelotte began her piano studies at the age of five, graduating in this instrument from the Federal University of Rio de Janeiro (UFRJ). It was while studying piano at the School of Music of the Federal University of Rio de Janeiro (EMUFRJ) that she had her first contact with the harpsichord. Later, she studied with Jacques Ogg at the Royal Conservatory of The Hague, Netherlands, specializing in harpsichord and baroque music.

She began her career in 1974 with the Rio de Janeiro musical group Quadro Cervantes, which she played with until 1990. In Europe, she performed at the Wigmore Hall and the Academy of St Martin in the Fields in London, at the Palazzo Barberini in Rome and at the exclusive Gulbenkian Foundation in Lisbon.

Known as a musician and researcher/computer science teacher, she recorded six harpsichord CDs, aiming to spread the instrument in Brazil, including performing works that had not yet been released on the continent, including compositions by Johann Sebastian Bach, Joseph Haydn, and the works of the Portuguese composer Pedro António Avondano, who had been forgotten even in his own country, but the harpsichordist discovered a collection of his sonatas in the libraries of Lisbon.

Since Rosana Lanzelotte continued the revivalist impulse of the harpsichord in Brazil (initiated in the 1960s by Roberto de Regina), some contemporary composers began to write directly for the harpsichord, which resulted in the selection of modern works recorded on her album O Cravo Brasileiro.

== Projects ==
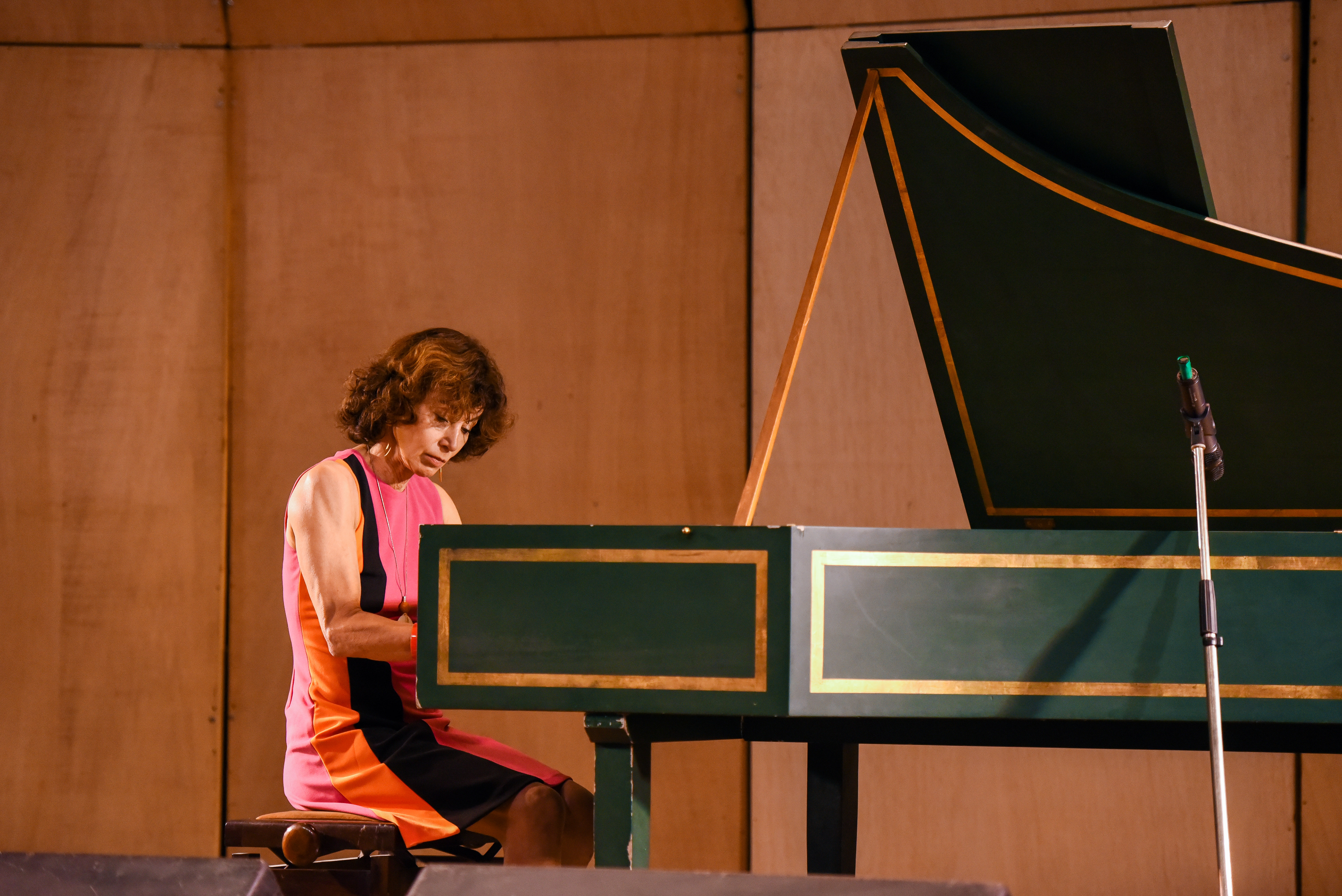
Lanzelotte playing the harpsichord during WikiCon Brazil 2022

=== Música nas Igrejas ===
Since 1993, Lanzelotte has directed the series Música nas Igrejas ("Music in Churches"), with the support of the Archdiocese of São Sebastião do Rio de Janeiro and the City Hall, together with Monsignor Félix Ferrà, OSB, presenting concerts in which national and international artists perform in the parishes of Rio de Janeiro, including those located in the poorest neighborhoods, whose musicalization has begun in places where the population would normally not have access to good classical music.

The project has already been presented in thirty neighborhoods in Rio de Janeiro. Since 2001, it has incorporated educational concerts for children in the suburbs and the West Zone.

=== Musica Brasilis ===
In 2009, Lanzelotte also coordinated the BNDES Circuit Musica Brasilis: de Bach às Bachianas, presenting, alongside Antonio Meneses and David Chew, 28 concerts in churches in Rio, São Paulo, Recife, Tiradentes and Ouro Preto.

==== Musica Brasilis website ====
Lanzelotte is the creator of the Musica Brasilis website, which provides sheet music, audio and video of musical pieces by Brazilian composers, from the colonial period to the contemporary era, as well as interactive resources that aim to stimulate research among the works made available.

The portal is part of the Musica Brasilis Project, which is sponsored by the National Bank for Economic and Social Development (BNDES) and brings together more than 6,000 works, including the entire production of Ernesto Nazareth.

== Discography ==
- Rosana Lanzelotte (1989)
- J.S. Bach (1995)
- O Cravo Brasileiro (1998)
- Haydn: Le Sette Ultime Parole del Nostro Redentore in Croce (2002)
- Cavaleiro Neukomm Criador da Música de Câmara no Brasil (2008)
