= Jan Krol =

Jan Krol may refer to:

- Jan Król (1950), Polish economist and politician
- Jan Krol (1962–2023), Dutch actor
- Jan Krol (1962–2023), Dutch politician
