= Position Among the Stars =

Position among the Stars
- Directed by: Leonard Retel Helmrich
- Written by: Hetty Naaijkens-Retel Helmrich; Leonard Retel Helmrich
- Produced by: Scarabeefilms
- Cinematography: Leonard Retel Helmrich
- Edited by: Jasper Naaijkens
- Distributed by: Cinema Delicatessen
- Release date: 17 November 2010
- Running time: 109 minutes
- Country: Netherlands
- Language: Indonesian

Position Among the Stars (Dutch: Stand van de Sterren) is a 2010 documentary film directed by Leonard Retel Helmrich. It was released on 17 November 2010 as the opening film of the IDFA (International Documentary Festival Amsterdam). The documentary is the continuation of Eye of the Day and Shape of the Moon and follows again the Sjamsuddin family, consisting of three generations, living in the slums of Jakarta, Indonesia.

== Writers ==
- Leonard Retel Helmrich
- Hetty Naaijkens-Retel Helmrich

== Plot ==
The film follows a family in transition as they adjust to bewildering gaps in education, outlook, religion and even class among three generations jammed into cramped quarters in Jakarta. At the head of the family the shiftless Bakti gambles incessantly with his Siamese fighting fish while his frustrated wife, Sri, runs a small food stall, and his orphaned niece, Tari, cares more about obtaining blue contact lenses than preparing for her high school graduation.

Tari emerges as the family's star as the tumult of democracy and corruption grip the country. Tari has the possibility that she may be the first in her family to experience higher education. She passes her final examination. With a mortgage on the home, they finance her university study. Her uncle Bakti quarrels with his wife. He uses holy water for his fighting fish, and she takes revenge by cooking them. Dwi (Baktis brother) is upset after their mother Rumijah has taught her little grandson Bagus a Christian prayer since the boy is raised by Dwi as a Muslim. There is a near fire as the family converts from cooking with oil to cheaper gas. Bakti drags the poor grandmother Rumijah back from life in her ancestral village to take charge of the youngster and expose Tari to traditional values in the run-up to her graduation and application to college.

== Background ==
Director Leonard Retel Helmrich observed the fortunes of the Sjamsuddin family living in a Jakarta slum for twelve years. The result is a trilogy, covering the effects of the changing economy, politics and religion in Indonesia on family dynamics. Every part stands for its own tense: the past, the present and the future of the country. Yet, each film stands on its own and can be watched individually.

While the tumultuous changes that have rocked Indonesian society swirl around the family, more than anything Leonard Retel Helmrich has intimately captured a family in transition as they adjust to bewildering gaps in education, outlook, religion and even class among three generations jammed into cramped quarters. Retel Helmrich filmed in a remarkably intimate cinema verité style that he calls Single Shot Cinema, which emphasizes camera movement and long takes.

== Awards ==
- VPRO IDFA Award for Best Feature-Length Documentary - International Documentary Film Festival Amsterdam
- IDFA Award for Best Dutch Documentary - International Documentary Film Festival Amsterdam
- Big Stamp for Best Documentary in the International Competition - ZagrebDox
- Special Jury Prize for Best Documentary - World Cinema - Sundance Film Festival
