= Namibia–Netherlands relations =

- Namibia: Netherlands

Namibia–Netherlands relations are the bilateral relations between Namibia and the Netherlands. Diplomatic ties between the two nations were established on April 23, 1990.

== History ==
In 1793, the Dutch East India Company took over Walvis Bay.

In 1911, the Netherlands established their first diplomatic presence in Swakopmund.

Dutch political activist, Sietse Bosgra, supported Namibian independence, specifically, SWAPO.

On June 19, 2023, both Dutch Prime Minister, Mark Rutte, and Danish Prime Minister, Mette Frederiksen, paid a working visit to Windhoek. Both the University of Namibia and Radboud University Nijmegen signed an agreement to set up a telescope for Namibian space exploration. All three nations discussed green energy solutions during this visit.

== Trade ==
In 2024, the Netherlands exported $94.8M worth of goods to Namibia, $44.8M of which being refined petroleum. In the same year, Namibia exported $220M worth of goods to the Netherlands, $82M of which being refined copper.

== High-level visits ==
=== High level visits from the Netherlands to Namibia ===
- Mark Rutte (June 19, 2023)

== Diplomatic missions ==
- Namibia is accredited to the Netherlands through its embassy in Brussels.
- The Netherlands is accredited to Namibia through its embassy in Pretoria. The Netherlands does have an honorary consulate in Windhoek.

== See also ==
- Foreign relations of Namibia
- Foreign relations of the Netherlands
