= Expeditie Robinson 2024 =

- Season 26
- Presented by: Nicolette Kluijver; Art Rooijakkers
- No. of days: 35
- No. of castaways: 20
- Winner: Kiran Badloe
- Runners-up: Marijn Kuipers; Timor Steffens
- Location: Johor, Malaysia

Release
- Original network: RTL 4
- Original release: 1 September – 29 December 2024

Season chronology
- ← Previous; 2023 Next → 2025

Expeditie Robinson 2024 is the twenty-sixth season of the Dutch reality television series Expeditie Robinson. The season moves to Johor, Malaysia where 20 Dutch celebrities compete against each other for food, rewards, immunity and to avoid tribal council. The season is hosted yet again by Nicolette Kluijver and Art Rooijakkers where the season premieres on RTL 4 on 1 September 2024. The season concluded on 29 December 2024 where Kiran Badloe won in the final challenge against Marijn Kuipers and Timor Steffens to win the grand prize and be crowned Robinson.

== Contestants ==
List of Expeditie Robinson 2024 contestants
Contestant	Original Tribe	Swapped Tribe	Merged Tribe	Main Game	Titans' Island (Note: Until day 12.) Revenge Island (Note: Day 12 onwards.)	Finish
Kimmylien Nguyen; 44, The Real Housewives of Amsterdam Star	South Team			3rd voted out Day 4	Left competition Day 5	20th Day 5
Justine Marcella; 53, Journalist	North Team			5th voted out Day 8	Left competition Day 12	19th Day 12
Kiran Badloe; Returned to the game	South Team			1st voted out Day 2	Returnee; Day 12	
Thomas van der Vlugt; Returned to the game	North Team			2nd voted out Day 2	Returnee; Day 12	
Sergio Hasselbaink; 41, Actor	North Team	North Team		7th voted out Day 13	Left competition Day 14	18th Day 14
Rikkie Kollé; 23, Model	South Team	None		4th voted out Day 6	Lost challenge Day 15	17th Day 15
Julie Josephine Reinders; 28, Fashion Entrepreneur	South Team	North Team		8th voted out Day 15	Refused offer Day 15	16th Day 15
Farja Favardin; 32, TV Host	South Team	South Team		Lost challenge Day 18	Lost challenge Day 18	15th Day 18
Thomas van der Vlugt; 32, YouTuber	North Team	North Team		Lost challenge Day 18	Lost challenge Day 18	14th Day 18
Hamza Othman; Returned to the game	South Team	None		6th voted out Day 10	Won challenge Day 18	
Ymre Stiekema; Returned to the game	South Team	North Team		9th voted out Day 17	Won challenge Day 18	
Ymre Stiekema; 32, Model	South Team	North Team	Sabira	Left competition Day 20		13th Day 20
Ellemieke Vermolen; 47, Actress	North Team	South Team	Sabira	Left competition Day 21		12th Day 21
Billy Dans; 33, Rapper	South Team	South Team	Sabira	10th voted out Day 21		11th Day 21
Joy van Swieten; 27, B&B Vol Liefde Contestant	North Team	North Team	Sabira	11th voted out Day 23		10th Day 23
Vincent Visser; 23, Actor	South Team	South Team	Sabira	12th voted out Day 25		9th Day 25
Jamie Kames; 30, TV Personality	North Team	South Team	Sabira	13th voted out Day 27		8th Day 27
Ramon Brugman; 48, TV Chef	North Team	North Team	Sabira	14th voted out Day 30		7th Day 30
Hamza Othman; 25, Actor	South Team	None	Sabira	15th voted out Day 32		6th Day 32
Ouassima Tajmout; 35, Radio DJ	North Team	South Team	Sabira	Lost challenge Day 34		4th Day 34
Nouchka Fontijn; 36, Former Boxer	North Team	North Team	Sabira	Lost challenge Day 34		4th Day 34
Timor Steffens; 36, Dancer	North Team	North Team	Sabira	2nd Runner-up; Day 35		3rd Day 35
Marijn Kuipers; 24, Influencer	South Team	South Team	Sabira	Runner-up; Day 35		2nd Day 35
Kiran Badloe; 29, Windsurfer	South Team	South Team	Sabira	Robinson; Day 35		1st Day 35

== Challenges ==
Episode	Air date	Titan's Island (ep. 2-5) Revenge Island (ep. 5-9)		Challenges		Eliminated	Vote	Finish
Episode	Air date	Winner(s)	Loser(s)	Reward	Immunity	Eliminated	Vote	Finish
Episode 1	1 September 2024			Timor; Marijn (Note: The challenge was won as a couple. The winners were given an immunity coin each as a reward, and they picked the teams.)	None			
Episode 1	1 September 2024			South Team	None			
Episode 2	8 September 2024			None		Kiran	Consensus by North Tribe	1st voted out Day 2
Episode 2	8 September 2024			None		Thomas	Consensus by South Tribe	2nd voted out Day 2
Episode 2	8 September 2024	Thomas	Kiran	North Team		Kimmylien	8–1	3rd voted out Day 4
Episode 3	15 September 2024	Kiran	Thomas	North Team		Rikkie	7–1	4th voted out Day 6
Episode 4	22 September 2024	Thomas	Kiran	South Team		Justine	5–3–1	5th voted out Day 8
Episode 5	29 September 2024	Kiran	Thomas	North Team		Hamza	3–3–1	6th voted out Day 10
Episode 6	6 October 2024			South Team		Sergio	6–2	7th voted out Day 13
Episode 7	13 October 2024	Hamza	Rikkie	South Team (Note: North Team originally won the challenge. However, Kiran earned an Hourglass Advantage, allowing South Team to change the course of time, meaning they could play it after losing a challenge, changing it to them winning it. South Tribe played the Hourglass Advantage, and therefore North Tribe's victory was annulled.)		Julie	5–1–1	8th voted out Day 15
Episode 8	20 October 2024			South Team		Ymre	5–1	9th voted out Day 17
Episode 9	27 October 2024	Hamza	Farja	Timor	None	Thomas	None	Lost challenge Day 18
Episode 9	27 October 2024	Ymre	Thomas	Timor	None	Farja	None	Lost challenge Day 18
Episode 10	3 November 2024			Vincent [Ramon, Billy]		Ymre	None	Left competition Day 20
Episode 11	10 November 2024			Timor [Ouassima, Joy]		Ellemieke	None	Left competition Day 21
Episode 11	10 November 2024			Timor [Ouassima, Joy]		Billy	9–3–2	10th voted out Day 21
Episode 12	17 November 2024			Kiran [Nouchka, Marijn]		Joy	8–3–1–1	11th voted out Day 23
Episode 13	24 November 2024			Kiran [Jamie, Ouassima]		Vincent	10–9–2	12th voted out Day 25
Episode 14	1 December 2024			Nouchka [Kiran, Hamza]		Jamie	8–3–1–1	13th voted out Day 27
Episode 15	8 December 2024			Kiran [Hamza]		Ramon	4–2–1	14th voted out Day 30
Episode 16	15 December 2024			Kiran		Hamza	6–1–0	15th voted out Day 32
Episode 17	22 December 2024			Kiran		None		
Episode 17	22 December 2024			Timor		None		
Episode 18	29 December 2024			Marijn		Ouassima	None	Lost challenge Day 34
Episode 18	29 December 2024			Marijn		Nouchka	None	Lost challenge Day 34
Episode 18	29 December 2024					Timor	None	2nd Runner-up
Episode 18	29 December 2024					Marijn	None	Runner-up
Episode 18	29 December 2024					Kiran	None	Robinson

== Voting history ==
#	Original Tribes							Swapped Tribes			No Tribes		Merged Tribe															
Episode	2			3	4	5		6	7	8	9		10		11		12	13	14	15	16	17		18				
Day	2		4	6	8	10		13	15	17	18		20		21		23	25	27	30	32	33	34			35		
Tribe	North	South	South	South	North	South		North	North	North	None		Sabira															
Voted out	Kiran (Note: Voted out by Team North to go to Titans' Island)	Thomas (Note: Voted out by Team South to go to Titans' Island)	Kimmylien	Rikkie	Justine	Tie	Hamza	Sergio	Julie	Ymre	Thomas	Farja	Ymre	~~Jamie~~	Ellemieke	Billy	Joy	Vincent	Jamie	Ramon	Hamza	None		Ouassima	Nouchka	Timor	Marijn	Kiran
Votes	Consensus	Consensus	8-1	7-1	5-3-1	3-3-1	Challenge	6-2	5-1-1	5-1	Challenge		None	4-3-3-2	None	9-3-2	8-3-1-1	10-9-2	8-3-1-1	4-2-1	6-1-0 (Note: Before tribal council, Marijn handed her immunity coin to Ouassima. Ouassima played this coin, cancelling six votes against her.)	Challenge				Challenge		
Voter	Votes																											
Kiran			Titans' Island								Safe			Jamie		Billy	Joy	Ouassima	Jamie (2x)	(Letter) (Note: At tribal council, each player was offered a letter from home in exchange of their right to vote. Marijn and Kiran accepted the offer; therefore losing their right to vote.)	~~Ouassima (4x)~~	Won				Robinson		
Marijn			Kimmylien	Rikkie		Billy					Safe			Jamie		Billy	Joy	Vincent	Jamie (2x)	(Letter) (Note: At tribal council, each player was offered a letter from home in exchange of their right to vote. Marijn and Kiran accepted the offer; therefore losing their right to vote.)	Hamza	Safe	Safe	Won		Runner-up		
Timor					Justine			Sergio	Julie	Ymre	Won			Ellemieke					Marijn	Marijn	Marijn	Safe	Won			2nd Runner-up		
Nouchka					Joy			Ymre	Julie	Ymre	Safe			Ellemieke		Billy	Joy	Vincent			Hamza (4x)	Safe	Safe	Lost				
Ouassima					Justine						Safe			Billy		Billy	?	Vincent	Jamie (2x)	Ramon (2x)	Hamza	Safe	Safe	Lost				
Hamza			Kimmylien	Rikkie		Farja	Lost							Jamie		Billy	Nouchka	Vincent	Jamie (2x)	Ramon	~~Ouassima~~							
Ramon					Justine			Sergio	Julie	Ymre	Safe			Ellemieke		Billy	?	Marijn (2x)	Marijn (2x)	Hamza (2x)								
Jamie					Sergio						Safe			Billy		Billy	?	Marijn	Kiran									
Vincent			Kimmylien	Rikkie		Farja					Safe					Jamie	?	Marijn										
Joy					Justine			Sergio	Julie	Ymre	Safe			Billy		Billy	Nouchka (2x)											
Billy			Kimmylien	Rikkie		Farja					Safe			Joy		Ramon (3x)												
Ellemieke					Sergio						Safe			Jamie														
Ymre			Kimmylien	Rikkie		Hamza		Sergio	Nouchka	Nouchka																		
Farja			Kimmylien	Rikkie		Hamza	Won				Lost																	
Thomas			Titans' Island					Sergio	Julie	Ymre	Lost																	
Julie			Kimmylien	Rikkie		Hamza		Sergio	Thomas																			
Sergio					Justine			Ymre																				
Justine					Sergio																							
Rikkie			Kimmylien	Hamza																								
Kimmylien			Marijn																									
Black Vote														Joy		Jamie		Ouassima	Ramon	Ramon	~~Ouassima~~							
Black Vote														Joy		Billy		Ouassima	Ramon	Ramon	~~Ouassima~~							
