= Het Phoenix Mysterie =

- Directed by: Leonard Retel Helmrich
- Written by: Leonard Retel Helmrich
- Release date: October 19, 1990
- Running time: 93 minutes
- Country: Netherlands
- Language: Dutch

Het Phoenix Mysterie is a 1990 Dutch drama film directed by Leonard Retel Helmrich.

== Cast ==
- Luc Boyer ... Architect Alhamy Albakry
- Liz Snoyink ... Wethouder Natasja Merckelbach
- Manouk van der Meulen ... Malou
- Rutger Weemhoff ... Johan Cooyman
- Jake Kruyer ... Frank Smulders
- Martijn Oversteegen ... Remon Dominicus
- Berry van Oudheusden ... Twan van Berkel
- Koos Elfering ... Sloper Mari
- Hans Krosse ... Wethouder
- Jan Naaijkens ... Directeur architectenbureau
- Bram Wiersma ... Poppenspeler
- Roel den Ouden ... Hotelbediende
- Huub Mensen ... Stationschef
- Lieveke Roelofs ... Toiletjuffrouw
