= Rooijakkers =

Rooijakkers is a Dutch surname. Notable people with this surname include:

- Art Rooijakkers (born 1976), Dutch television presenter
- Pauliena Rooijakkers (born 1993), Dutch cyclist
- Piet Rooijakkers (born 1980), Dutch cyclist
- Gertjan Rooijakkers (born 1964), Dutch film producer
