= Honneponnetje =

- Theatrical release poster
- Directed by: Ruud van Hemert
- Written by: Ruud van Hemert
- Edited by: Willem Hoogenboom
- Music by: Ruud van Hemert
- Distributed by: Cannon Films
- Release date: 30 June 1988
- Running time: 95 minutes
- Country: Netherlands
- Language: Dutch

Honneponnetje is a 1988 Dutch film directed by Ruud van Hemert.

== Plot ==
A teenage nun escapes the convent to discover the real world outside. Her parents however believe that she's kidnapped.

== Cast ==
- Nada van Nie as Honneponnetje
- Marc Hazewinkel as Harry
- Hans Man in 't Veld as Evert, vader van Honneponnetje
- Marijke Merckens as Gerda, moeder van Honneponnetje
- Coen Flink as Desiderius
- Herbert Flack as Apollo Romansky
