= Jacques Ogg =

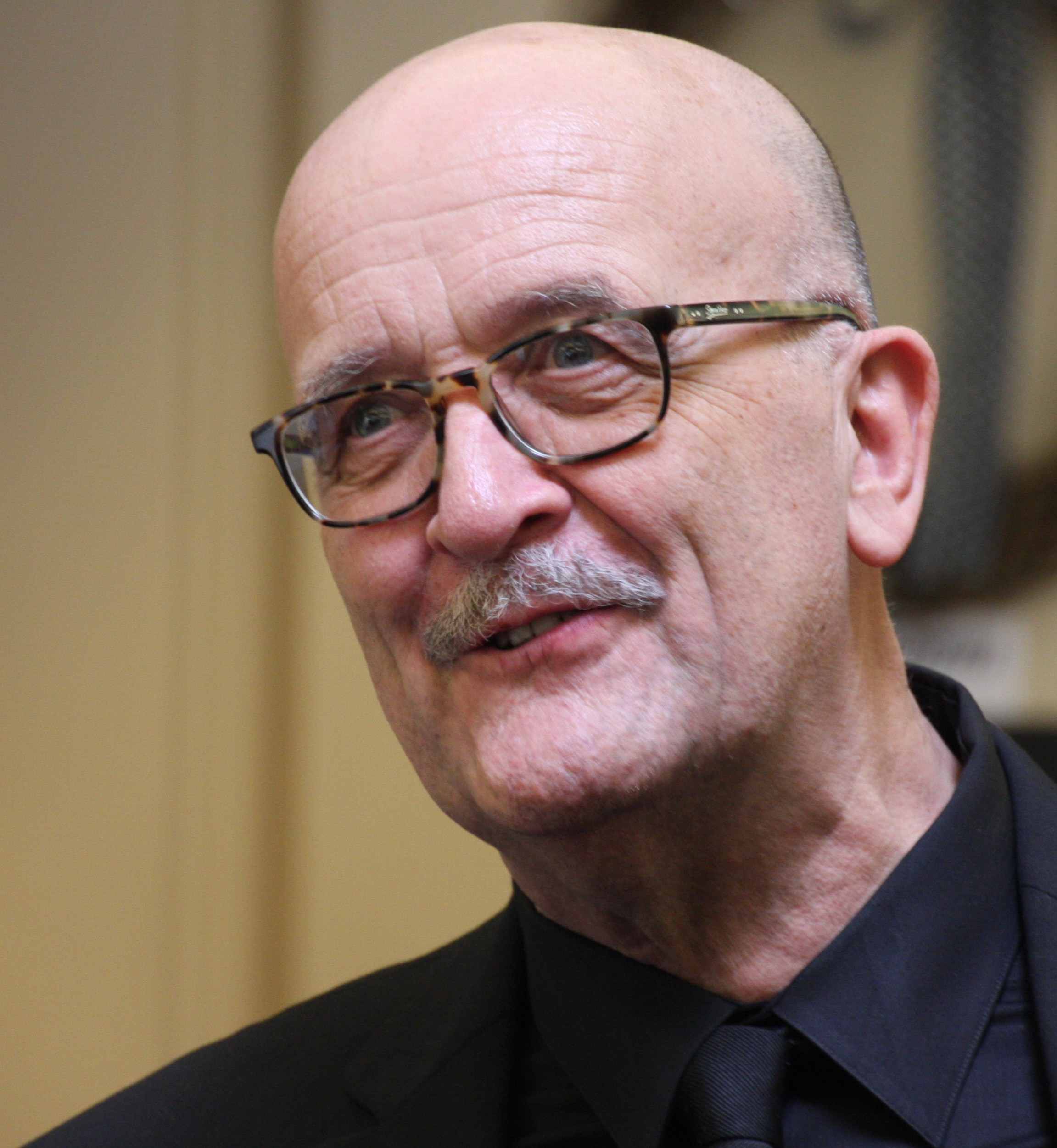

Background information
- Born: 28 August 1948 (age 77); Maastricht, Netherlands
- Occupation: Conductor
- Instrument: Keyboard

Jacques Ogg (born 28 August 1948 in Maastricht) is an international Dutch keyboardist on the harpsichord and fortepiano, and a conductor. He specializes in Classical and Baroque music on period instruments.

Jacques Ogg studied harpsichord in Maastricht with Anneke Uittenbosch and organ with Kamiel D'Hooghe. From 1970 to 1974, he continued his harpsichord studies with Gustav Leonhardt at the Amsterdam Conservatory from which he graduated and received a [soloist diploma] in harpsichord. Jacques Ogg is currently known for his conducting activities and for playing harpsichord and fortepiano, including both solo concerts and concerts with ensembles and orchestras

2000-2024, he served as the artistic director of the Lyra Baroque Orchestra in St Paul, Minnesota. Jacques Ogg has given masterclasses worldwide in countries including Brazil, Canada, Spain, Portugal, Argentina, Poland, South Korea and the United States. Ogg has made many recordings over the years. One of his most well known recordings is Bach's Goldberg Variations.

He is emeritus professor at the Royal Conservatory of The Hague, Netherlands
