= Toos Grol-Overling =

Dutch politician (1931–2023)

Member of the Senate of the Netherlands
- In office 26 January 1982 – 8 June 1999

Personal details
- Born: Anna Catherina Grol-Overling; 20 March 1931 Doetinchem, Netherlands
- Died: 12 January 2023 (aged 91) Deventer, Netherlands
- Party: KVP; CDA
- Occupation: Teacher

Anna Catherina "Toos" Grol-Overling (20 March 1931 – 12 January 2023) was a Dutch teacher and politician. A member of the Christian Democratic Appeal, she served in the Senate from 1982 to 1999.

Grol-Overling died in Deventer on 12 January 2023, at the age of 91.
