= Fred Florusse =

Dutch actor (1938–2023)

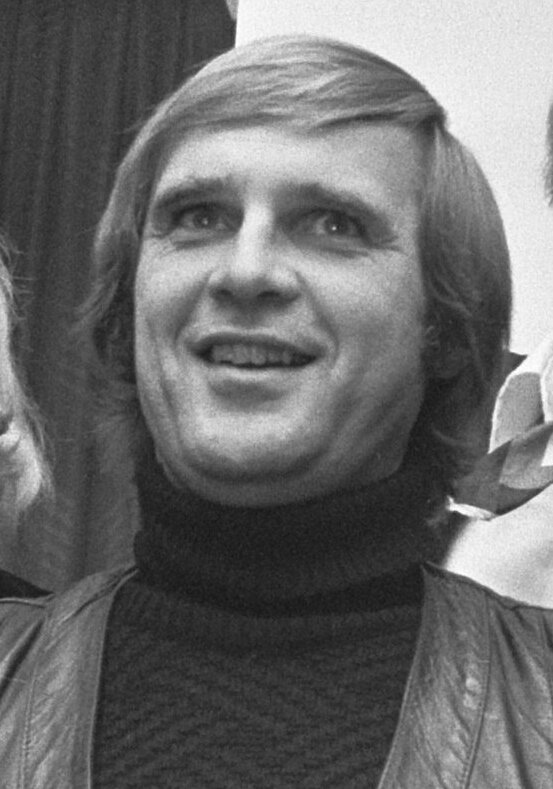
- Florusse in 1974
- Born: Willem Fredrik Florusse; 6 February 1938; Vlissingen, Netherlands
- Died: 21 March 2023 (aged 85); Amsterdam, Netherlands
- Occupation: Actor

Willem Fredrik "Fred" Florusse (6 February 1938 – 21 March 2023) was a Dutch actor, comedian, stage director and TV and radio presenter, whose career spanned over five decades.

== Life and career ==
Born in Vlissingen into a working-class family, Florusse studied economics and accountancy and worked in an administration office, while acting in small amateur dramatics as a hobby. He had his breakout in the late 1960s, as a member and co-founder of the popular comedy group Don Quishocking, with whom he won several prizes, including the Zilveren Harp. The group disbanded in 1987, and Florusse started a solo career as an actor and stage director, directing Karin Bloemen, Paul de Leeuw, Joke Bruijs, Simone Kleinsma and Hans Dorrestijn, among others.

Florusse was also active as a television and radio presenter, hosting several VARA programs. In his later years he taught acting in the Academy of Theatre and Dance of the Amsterdam University of the Arts.

Florusse died of cancer on 21 March 2023, at the age of 85.
