= Harrij Notenboom =

Dutch politician (1926–2023)

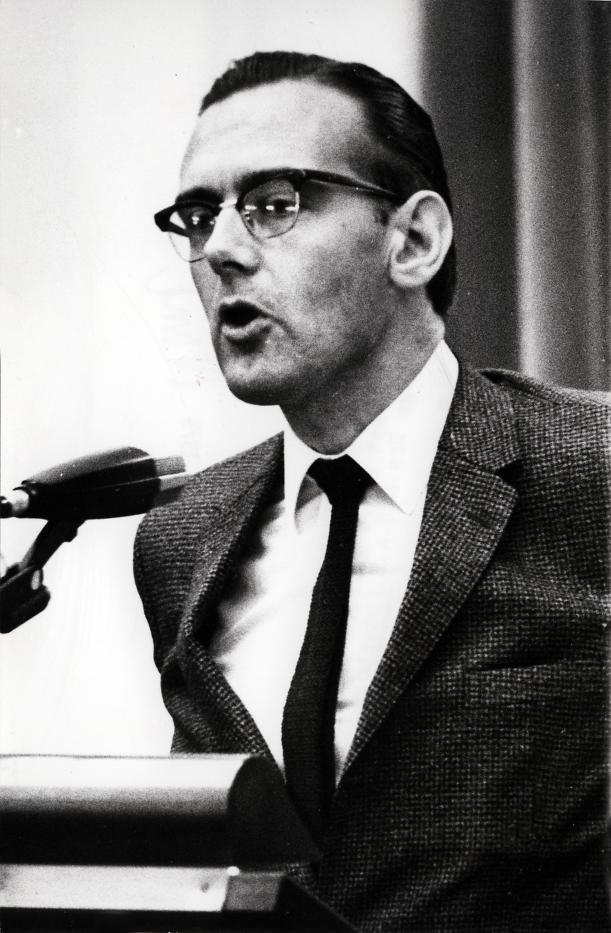
- Notenboom in 1968

Member of the House of Representatives
- In office 5 June 1963 – 17 July 1979

Member of the European Parliament
- In office 22 September 1971 – 24 July 1984

Personal details
- Born: 31 August 1926 Roosendaal, Netherlands
- Died: 9 August 2023 (aged 96) Venlo, Netherlands
- Party: Catholic People's Party; Christian Democratic Appeal

Henricus Antonius Cornelis Marie "Harrij" Notenboom (31 August 1926 – 9 August 2023) was a Dutch politician. He served as member of the House of Representatives from 1963 to 1979 and in the European Parliament from 1971 to 1984. Notenboom was a member of the Catholic People's Party and later the Christian Democratic Appeal when the former had merged into it in 1980.

As financial specialist of the Catholic People's Party he was influential in the Night of Schmelzer, which led to the fall of the Cals cabinet. Notenboom criticized the budget as proposed by Cals.

== Career ==
Notenboom was born in Roosendaal on 31 August 1926. He was adjunct secretary of the Nederlandse Rooms-Katholieke Middenstandsbond from September 1952 to January 1956. He subsequently served as director of the Katholieke Limburgse Middenstandsbond until 1969.

In 1988 he obtained his title of doctor in economic sciences with a thesis on budget law of the European Parliament.

Notenboom was bijzonder hoogleraar (professor not paid by University funds) of problematics of small and medium-sized enterprises between 1991 and 1994 at Eindhoven University of Technology.

Notenboom died on 9 August 2023, at the age of 96.
