= Simone Kramer =

Dutch writer (1939–2023)

- Born: Cornelia Simone Kramer; 9 July 1939; Bodegraven, Netherlands
- Died: 9 January 2023 (aged 83) 's-Graveland, Netherlands
- Occupations: Children's writer, translator

Cornelia Simone Kramer-Kramer (9 July 1939 – 9 January 2023) was a Dutch children's writer and translator.

== Biography ==
Kramer was born in Bodegraven, Netherlands, in 1939, as the youngest in a family of eight children. Her father was a primary school principal in Bodegraven. After primary school, she attended the gymnasium and went afterwards to music school. During her studies, Kramer worked part-time as a doctor's assistant and saleswoman in a department store.

In 1966, she started working for the VARA, at first in the music department and later in the film department. She translated many films including The BFG of Roald Dahl. In 1984, Kramer started working as a children's book author for children from the age of ten years. In addition, Kramer wrote picture books and books for younger children. Her books were published by Uitgeverij Ploegsma. Kramer included Greek mythology in her stories. Her best known book was Een steen door de ruit (1987), which received a tip from the Nederlandse Kinderjury and won the prize of the Children and Youth Jury Limburg.

Kramer died in 's-Graveland, Netherlands, on 9 January 2023, at the age of 83.
