= Peter d'Hamecourt =

Dutch journalist (1946–2023)

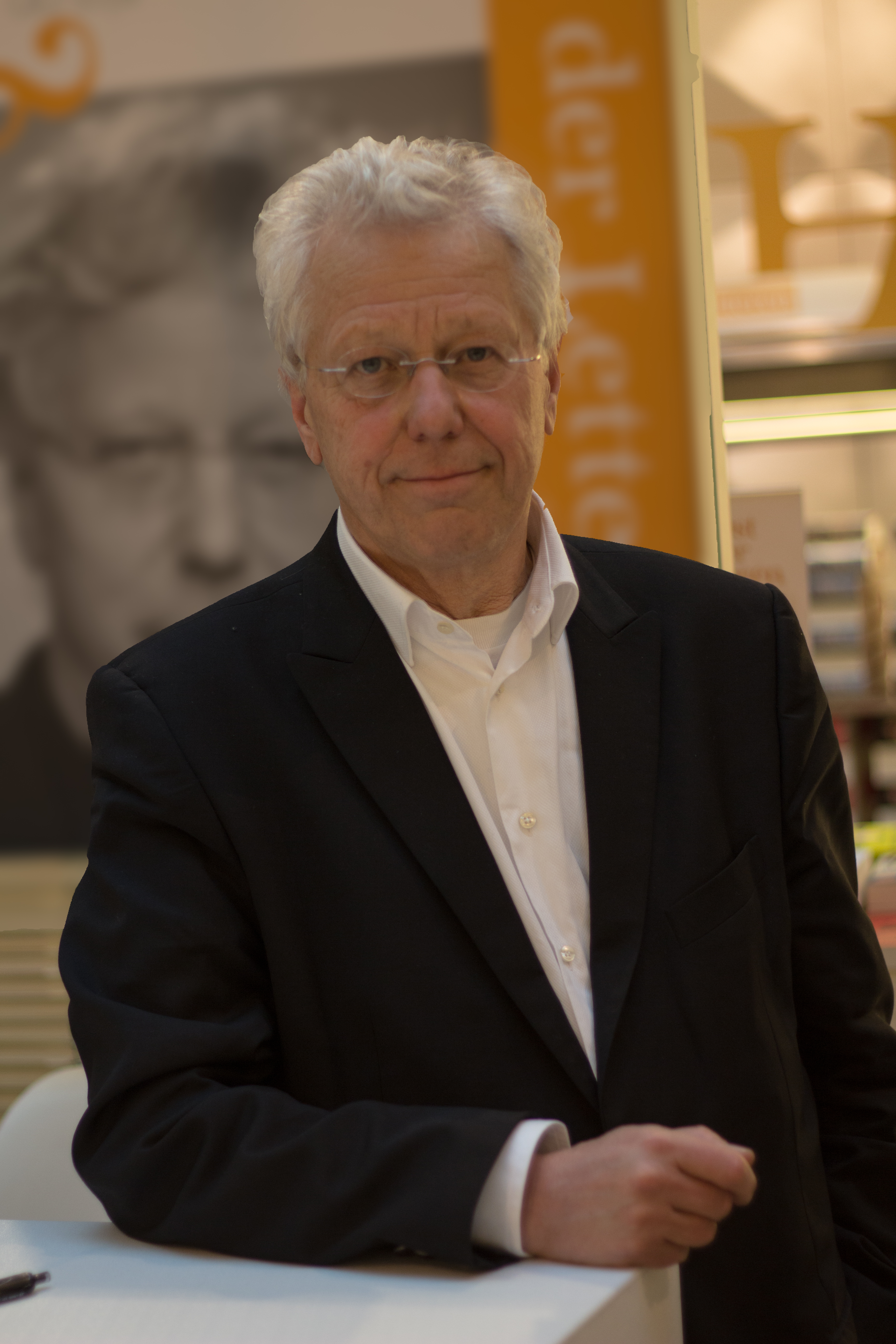
- d'Hamecourt in 2015
- Born: 1946; Vlaardingen, the Netherlands
- Died: 3 December 2023 (aged 77); Lot-et-Garonne, France
- Occupations: Journalist, correspondent, writer
- Years active: 1966–2008 (as journalist and correspondent)

Peter d'Hamecourt (1946 – 3 December 2023) was a Dutch journalist, correspondent and writer. He spent most of his career in Moscow, Russia, where he worked from 1988 until his retirement in 2008.

During his time in Russia he made over 3,000 contributions for the NOS News and for many Dutch citizens became the face of Russia. He worked for a long time for newspaper Algemeen Dagblad and made television and radio contributions for Dutch Nova and EenVandaag and Flemish broadcaster VRT. He also wrote several books on Russia.

== Early life and career ==
d'Hamecourt was born in Vlaardingen in 1946. His father was a Catholic window-dresser, while his mother was an atheistic manual work teacher. He had an elder sister, Ada. In his youth he played football for RK Willen is Kunnen, where the chaplain encouraged his team to kick the shins of Protestant opponents, Zwaluwen. During his education nuns encouraged him to stop writing left-handed. He attended the Meer Uitgebreid Lager Onderwijs in Vlaardingen between 1958 and 1962. In 1966 he started working for the Nieuwe Vlaardingsche Courant. During this period he was known to have a broad interest. He later became a pop-journalist for Haagsche Courant and following this he held the same position at Dutch newspaper Algemeen Dagblad. At the latter he switched fields from music to foreign affairs and in the 1980s worked as correspondent in the Middle East and South America. During this time he reported on the 1982 Lebanon War and the Falklands War.

== Time in Russia and afterwards ==
In 1988 he became correspondent for Algemeen Dagblad in the Russian capital Moscow. Upon his arrival he was both shocked and reassured. He found the country being less a police state than expected and encountered a parallel world with a black market from which the state was absent. In the informal economy payments were made with golden, silver and wooden rubles. He found everyone evading the law and negotiating. D'Hamecourt was also asked by taxi drivers to be paid with 24 cans of Heineken beer rather than rubles. He appreciated the "anarchistic mess" and immediately thought he would feel at home. In 1991 he also became journalist for the NOS Journaal. At one point he also became a reporter for the Flemish VRT working for both television and radio. D'Hamecourt also worked for television programs Nova and EenVandaag. To become less reliant on Algemeen Dagblad he founded the private Holland Bureau for his journalistic work, which at one point employed at least nine people. In 1999 he became a freelancer for Algemeen Dagblad, NOS and VRT. In 2001 and 2003 his name circulated as possible chief editor of Algemeen Dagblad, but it did not came to fruition.

At the start of his time in Russia d'Hamecourt was part of the close-knit community of around 300 correspondents, which discussed their troubles to get by and deal with the black market economy. Under President Boris Yeltsin's first term in office he experienced a high degree of freedom, being able to travel without restrictions to Chechnia. In Yeltsin's second term this deteriorated. He also found the system to become more bureaucratic. D'Hamecourt managed to evade legal trouble regarding his dacha by getting close with a local general and paying him off.

While in Russia, he covered several large scale events, such as the dissolution of the Soviet Union, the First Chechen War and Chechen–Russian conflict, the Kursk submarine disaster in 2000, the 2002 Moscow theater hostage crisis and the Beslan school siege in 2004. He also reported on the countries of the former Soviet Union and other countries, such as when an earthquake occurred in Afghanistan, stating that he was called by the minister of foreign affairs of the Northern Alliance to report on the matter. In 2008 he took up early retirement. During his career he covered over 3000 stories on television for NOS Journaal. For the NOS he was succeeded by Kysia Hekster. After his retirement he at times commented on Russian affairs in talk shows. d'Hamecourt also worked as a public speaker and tour guide. In 2014 he warned against assuming that Russian leader Vladimir Putin was a "cool, calculating dictator", but rather assessed him to be typified by "typical Russian recklessness".

During his career he wrote more than 10 books on Russia. He also wrote books on Napoleon and Fyodor Dostoevsky. He also produced a podcast on the Russian invasion of Ukraine.

=== Views on Russia ===
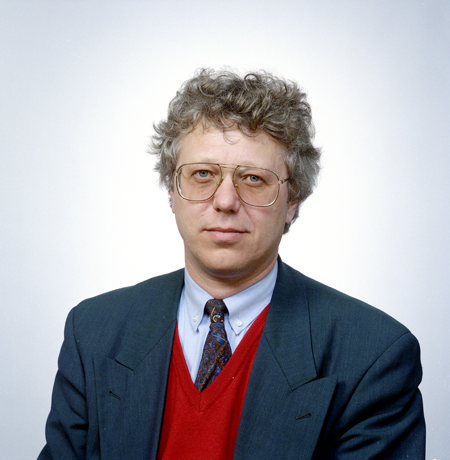
d'Hamecourt in 1992

D'Hamecourt found the Russians to be helpful people, who, lacking a functional government, were focused on finding means to get by. He found Russia lacking in a democracy, illustrating this by stating that local civil organizations were not present, such as bird clubs, with permits for those clubs being stalled by the government. d'Hamecourt was critical of the Russian government. During his twenty years in Russia d'Hamecourt felt that the corruption and repression increased. Dutch journalist Derk Sauer mockingly stated that d'Hamecourt predicted the fall of the Russian government every month. In 2011 d'Hamecourt stated that the only present ideology in the country was "cynical, powerhungry, indifference".

== Style and impact ==
D'Hamecourt characterized himself to be a product of the 1960s and a hothead, throwing tantrums and demanding a position from his at the Algemeen Dagblad. He did not like authority and in the 1990s fell out with Algemeen Dagblad editor-in-chief Peter van Dijk, of whom d'Hamecourt thought he had irrealistic expectations of being a correspondent. D'Hamecourt felt that as journalist it was not his job to find the ultimate truth, contrasting himself with fellow journalist Joris Luyendijk.

Contrary to the regular methods of Dutch media, d'Hamecourt was not in favour of correspondents having to switch countries every couple of years to avoid becoming overly involved. d'Hamecourt felt that how longer he lived in a country the better he knew it. d'Hamecourt preferred to be continuously making reports. Late in his career he stated he preferred to write rather than make television reports.

For many Dutch citizens d'Hamecourt became "the face of Russia". Chief editor of NOS News, Giselle van Cann, stated that d'Hamecourt was the first to make professional television reports from his working area and that he made sure that NOS News always had the latest news from the former Soviet-Union and Afghanistan. Fellow journalist Geert Groot Koerkamp stated that d'Hamecourt had an eye for news, noticing when a story could become big while other international news agencies were still unaware.

== Personal life ==
D'Hamecourt was married to Russian Zoja Rjoetina, together they lived in the village of Ignatjevskoje, 130 km southeast of Moscow. They had been together since 1990. After his retirement in 2008 he first remained in Russia and later moved to France. In June 2011 d'Hamecourt was made a Knight in the Order of Orange-Nassau by the mayor of Bergen, North Holland, Hetty Hafkamp. At one point he had a tumour from his large intestine removed, he also suffered a transient ischemic attack. On 4 March 2018 he suffered a cerebral infarction, which left him partially paralized and a wheelchair user. He became reliant on his wife during this period, which put stress on the relationship. During his recovery he made notes which with the help of close friend Trix Broekman were developed into the book Een leven op zijn kop. Neuropsychologist Erik Scherder stated that he had never read such an impressive account.

He died of a heart attack on 3 December 2023 at his home in Lot-et-Garonne, France, at the age of 77. His elder sister Ada had predeceased him by four months.

== Works ==
- Moskou is een gekkenhuis, 2006.
- Petersburg – Paradijs in het Moeras
- Leven als God in Rusland
- Russen zien ze vliegen, 2007.
- Vladimir Poetin – het koningsdrama, 2012.
- Rusland in oorlog – 1
- Rusland in oorlog – 2
- Toen Napoleon Maly verliet
- In het spoor van de Russische ziel – Dostojevski tussen Rusland en Europa
- Een leven op zijn kop, May 2021
