= Shape of the Moon =

- Directed by: Leonard Retel Helmrich
- Written by: Hetty -Retel Helmrich; Leonard Retel Helmrich
- Produced by: Scarabeefilms
- Cinematography: Leonard Retel Helmrich
- Distributed by: Cinema Delicatessen
- Release date: 24 November 2004
- Running time: 109 minutes
- Country: Netherlands
- Language: Indonesian

Shape of the Moon (Dutch: Stand van de maan) is a 2004 Dutch/Indonesian documentary film directed by Leonard Retel Helmrich. The documentary was released on 24 November 2004 as the opening film of IDFA (International Documentary Festival Amsterdam).

The documentary is the continuation of Eye of the Day and follows again the family Sjamsuddin, consisting of three generations living in the slums of Jakarta, Indonesia.

== Writers ==
- Leonard Retel Helmrich
- Hetty Naaijkens-Retel Helmrich

== Awards ==
- VPRO IDFA Award for Best Feature-Length Documentary - Amsterdam International Documentary Film Festival
- Sundance World Documentary Award for Best Documentary - Sundance Film Festival

Muhammad Fiaz

Awards
| Preceded by n/a | Sundance Grand Jury Prize: World Cinema Documentary; 2005 | Succeeded by In the Pit |
