= Mathieu Segers =

Dutch historian (1976–2023)

- Born: 27 January 1976; Maastricht, Netherlands
- Died: 16 December 2023 (aged 47)

Academic background
- Education: Radboud University
- Thesis: Tussen verzoening en verval. De nationale standpuntbepaling van de Bondsrepubliek Duitsland gedurende de beraadslagingen en de onderhandelingen over de verdragen van Rome (2006)
- Doctoral advisor: R.H. Lieshout

Academic work
- Discipline: Contemporary history
- Sub-discipline: European history and History of the European Union
- Institutions: Utrecht University; Maastricht University
- Main interests: European integration, European Union
- Notable works: Reis naar het continent: Nederland en de Europese integratie, 1950 tot heden (2013)
- Website: www.maastrichtuniversity.nl/mll-segers

Mathieu Laurent Leon Segers (27 January 1976 − 16 December 2023) was a Dutch historian and professor of contemporary European history and European integration at Maastricht University. He was a much sought-after Europe expert on Dutch radio and television.

== Career ==
Segers studied political science at Radboud University and obtained his PhD there in 2006 with his thesis about the French-German cooperation in the 1950s. His thesis was translated in German and he was Fulbright-Schuman fellow at Harvard University in 2010. Three years later, he was senior research fellow at Oxford University. From 2008 to 2016 he was an associate professor at Utrecht University and joined in 2016 Maastricht University as dean of University College Maastricht. Segers was also appointed professor of contemporary European history and European integration at Maastricht University.

Segers was awarded de Prinsjesboekenprijs in 2013 for his book Reis naar het continent. Nederland en de Europese integratie, 1950 tot heden. In the last year of his life, Segers published his magnum opus The Origins of European Integration and was co-editor in chief of The Cambridge History of the European Union.

From 1 January 2023, Segers also held a position at the Dutch Scientific Council for Government Policy. He was also a columnist for Het Financieele Dagblad and was podcast host of Café Europa.

== Illness and death ==
Segers was diagnosed with colorectal cancer in 2020 and died of this disease on 16 December 2023, at the age of 47. His book Europa en het idee van de toekomst was published posthumously in December 2024.

== Legacy ==
As a tribute to Segers' work, an annual lecture was organised after his death, the "Mathieu Segers Lecture". The very first lecture was delivered on 10 February 2025 in Nieuwspoort, The Hague by former European Commissioner Frans Timmermans. Part of the Europa Archives in Maastricht, particularly that relating to the Maastricht Treaty, is named after him.

== Selected bibliography ==
- 2006: Tussen verzoening en verval. De nationale standpuntbepaling van de Bondsrepubliek Duitsland gedurende de beraadslagingen en de onderhandelingen over de verdragen van Rome. PhF Radboud University Nijmegen (online tekst on repository.ubn.ru.nl)
- 2006: 'Zwischen Pax Americana und Pakt Atomica. Das deutsch-amerikanische Verhältnis während der EURATOM-Verhandlungen (1955-1957)', in: Vierteljahrshefte für Zeitgeschichte, jrg. 54–3, pp. 433–458 (co-author)
- 2008: 'The Relance Européenne and the Nuclear Dimension of Franco-German Rapprochement', in: C. Germond & H. Türk (eds.) A History of Franco-German Relations in Europe, pp. 177–189
- 2008: De Europese dagboeken van Max Kohnstamm, August 1953 - September 1957
- 2009: The Netherlands, the United States, Germany, and European Integration in the 1950s and 1960s (co-author)
- 2011: Diep Spel. De Europese dagboeken van Max Kohnstamm, September 1957 - February 1963
- 2013: Reis naar het continent. Nederland en de Europese integratie, 1950 tot heden
- 2014: Waagstuk Europa. Nederland en de grote Europese vraagstukken van vandaag
- 2016: Europa en de terugkeer van de geschiedenis
- 2016: Re:Thinking Europe: Thoughts on Europe: Past, Present and Future (co-author: Yoeri Albrecht)
- 2018: An Independent Mind: Europe and the Arts (co-author)
- 2023: The Cambridge History of the European Union (two volumes, co-author: Steven Van Hecke)
- 2023: The Origins of European Integration
- 2024: Europa en het idee uit de toekomst
