= Leonard Retel Helmrich =

Dutch cinematographer and film director (1959–2023)

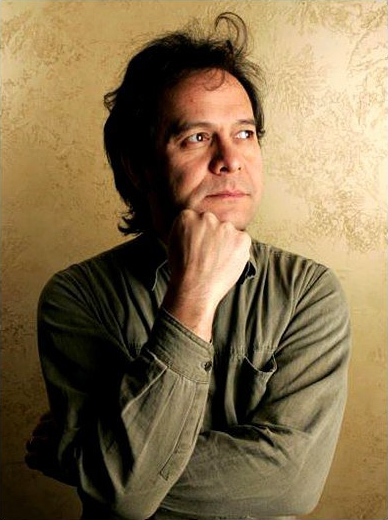
- Born: Leonard Retel Helmrich; 16 August 1959; Tilburg, Netherlands
- Died: 15 July 2023 (aged 63)
- Occupations: Director, writer, documentary maker, director of photography
- Years active: 1986–2023
- Awards: Amsterdam 2004 Sundance 2005 for Shape of the Moon; Amsterdam 2010 Best Documentary for Position Among the Stars; Sundance 2011 for Position among the Stars
- Website: www.scarabeefilms.com

Leonard Retel Helmrich (16 August 1959 – 15 July 2023) was a Dutch cinematographer and film director. Born in Tilburg, he moved to Amsterdam in 1982. He was a two-time International Documentary winner at the International Documentary Film Festival Amsterdam (IDFA). On June 5, 2018, he was awarded with the title Knight in the Order of the Netherlands Lion by the Dutch King Willem-Alexander. Helmrich was known for his work with the "single shot cinema" filming method.

== Biography ==
After Indonesian independence, the Helmrich family was repatriated to the Netherlands as part of the Indo diaspora. His father, Jean Retel Helmrich, was born to a wealthy totok family in Semarang, Dutch East Indies, and fought against the Japanese invaders during World War II, in which he was interred as a prisoner of war for three years. After the war, he married a Javanese woman. "It was forbidden," Mr. Helmrich's sister and producer, Hetty Naaijkens-Retel Helmrich, explained. "They had to get permission from the Queen, from the Indonesian government, the Dutch government, the Muslim church, and the Catholic Church. It was Romeo and Juliet." Growing up, the filmmaker "had a lot of problems because of his dyslexia," she said. "The teachers were always complaining that he was living in his own world, but already when he was a little boy he made very good drawings." The family's belief in him extended to financing Eye of the Day.

Leonard Retel Helmrich graduated from the Dutch Film and Television Academy in 1986 and in 1990 he made his first feature film, The Phoenix Mystery. His first documentary, Moving Objects (1991), was awarded the Special Jury Prize for the Best Artist-Profile at the International Golden Gate Film Festival of San Francisco. Helmrich developed his cinematic style based on a principle he developed and calls "Single Shot Cinema". After finishing Moving Objects, he decided to travel to Indonesia where his parents were born, with the idea to show people around the world what was happening in this country. In 1995, he made a film about Suharto and his wife in their Jakarta palace. He then went to Solo in central Java to film a demonstration against the Suharto regime. During his activities he was arrested by the police and accused of being a Western spy. With the help of the Dutch Embassy and his brother Anton, who happened to be in Indonesia, he was released after a few days. However, he was expelled from the country with the status persona non grata meaning he would no longer be allowed to visit Indonesia even though he was able to return 2 years later.

Leonard Retel Helmrich traveled to Kansas City, Missouri, to work with the Institute of Art in developing the principles of single shot cinema. In 1997, his brother succeeded in convincing the Indonesian government to change his persona non grata status, and Leonard Retel Helmrich was allowed to return to finish his work. Unfortunately a lot of material had been destroyed or was unusable. He decided to change his strategy. Many journalists were reporting the fall of Suharto and Helmrich wanted to focus on the micro-aspects of the changes by following an Indonesian family in one of Jakarta's slums. The rapid changes in politics and religion during that period, including Islamization, increases in poverty, social injustice, globalization, criminality, and corruption affected every Indonesian in their daily life. Thus he came up with the idea to film a trip about the struggle for survival of a family in those trying days in Indonesia. In 2001 he finished Eye of the Day (Stand van de Zon) and in 2004 he made Shape of the Moon (Stand van de Maan), which became a worldwide success.

Afterwards, Helmrich's films screened and won acclaim at film festivals worldwide, garnering major awards for both his drama and documentary work. His awards included the inaugural World Cinema Jury Prize Documentary at Sundance 2005 and the prestigious Joris Ivens Award at IDFA Amsterdam 2004 for his Indonesian feature documentary Shape of the Moon. In 2010, he won for the second time the Grand VPRO/IDFA Award for feature documentary for Position Among the Stars (Stand van de Sterren) together with the IDFA Award for the best Dutch documentary. It was the first time in the IDFA history that a director won this award for the second time. In January 2011 he won again at Sundance where he received the World Cinema Documentary Special Jury Prize for Position Among the Stars.

Helmrich served on the jury of many film festivals, including festivals in Shanghai, Warsaw, Seoul, Sibiu (Romania) and Amsterdam. He had major retrospectives of his work at Visions du Réel in Nyon, Switzerland, Rencontres Internationales du Documentaire in Montreal and ASTRA in Sibiu, Romania. He also lectured and screened his films at numerous educational institutions including the Flaherty Seminar Program in New York and at Harvard University where he was awarded a Fellowship at the Radcliffe Institute for Advanced Studies. Helmrich shot as well as directed all his films and was best known for a philosophy and approach he called 'single shot cinema', which involved long takes with a hand-held but smooth camera moving close to the subject. Above all, in his films, it is the framing and movement of the camera that captures and leads the emotions of the audience. He taught numerous workshops on single shot cinema techniques for film festivals, television broadcasters, independent filmmakers, film schools, and universities in Europe, Asia, North America, Australia and in Africa. During his Harvard fellowship, he was editing his latest film Position Among the Stars, the third film of his trilogy on contemporary Indonesia. He was later writing a book about "Single Shot Cinema".

In 2017, Helmrich had a heart attack in Lebanon. He went without oxygen for 9 minutes, but later recovered.

Helmrich died on 15 July 2023, at the age of 63.

== Single shot cinema ==
Single shot cinema is a way of filming that enables one to shoot a scene in one single take using just one camera moving fluidly around the subject recording all the camera angles that express one's personal feeling and perception of that moment. The camera moves steadily and fluidly while constantly changing angles. As Leonard Retel Helmrich described:

“I try to keep the camera moving at all times. Very slow or very fast but always moving, even if it is less noticeable e.g. when a person is speaking. Just like the surface of water, which is never completely motionless.”

The idea is to use fast and slow, high and low, close and far camera movements in a single shot within a scene. In this way, the camera movement itself becomes the primary cinematic expression.

To maintain shot stability, Leonard created a device called the Comodo Orbit for mounting the camera. By facilitating free movement within a space, this technique permits filming from diverse and sometimes unconventional angles, enabling close-up shots of both people and animals. This technique is exemplified in Shape of the Moon (2004).

"In Shape of the Moon (2004) a barefoot man crosses a railroad trestle a thousand feet above an Indonesian valley, stepping briskly along a beam barely wider than his feet. We see him from behind. We see him from above. Most alarming, we see him from the side, by means of a camera that seems mounted in midair. It's breathtaking, what the subject is doing. But a man with a camera is doing it too." John Anderson, The New York Times.

Helmrich was inspired by the French film critic André Bazin whose ideas helped create the Nouvelle Vague films of Jean-Luc Godard and François Truffaut. According to Bazin, a moving camera is the essence of filmmaking: "It should not cut up reality, but rather it should show reality in its temporal continuity." Single shot cinema in documentary means catching real life moments while they are happening in one continuous shot with a camera that is moving around the subject. As a result, shots are not edited from one still moment to the next, but rather from one camera movement to the next. In practice, this means that the camera movement must have a dramatic purpose. In accordance with this technique, all footage shot should be usable for editing. In order to accomplish this, the filmmaker should always keep the center of attention within the camera frame. Bazin goes on to say that the camera must be equally prepared to move as to remain still. He describes camera movement in Italian neorealism as having a human quality, as a projection of the hand and the eye, almost like a living part of the operator flowing directly from his awareness.

"His camera glides through spaces in a way that just seems impossible... Sometimes you stop looking at the movie and look at the shot. But I think it's delightful." Robb Moss, film lecturer at Harvard.

== Filmography ==
- 1986 De Drenkeling (The Drowning Man, Dutch Film- en Television Academy)
- 1988 Dag mijn klas, ik mis jullie allemaal (Documentary for NOS television)
- 1990 The Phoenix Mystery (feature fiction film with Luc Boyer, Liz Snoyink en Manouk van der Meulen)
- 1991 Moving Objects (documentary about performing art) produced by Scarabeefilms
- 1994 Jemand auf der Treppe (single shot cinema report about Orkater during the performance) produced by Scarabeefilms
- 1995 Art Non-Blok (Contemporary Art of the non-aligned countries AN-television Indonesia)
- 1996 Closed Circuit (Art Performance of the Kansas City Art Institute)
- 1999 Als een vloedlijn (documentary about Feike Boschma, performing artist) produced by Scarabeefilms
- 2000 The body of Indonesia's conscience (documentary for Indonesian conference)
- 2001 De Stand van de Zon (Eye of the Day) produced by Scarabeefilms
- 2003 Vlucht uit de Hemel (Flight from Heaven, documentary for VPRO television) produced by Scarabeefilms
- 2004 Stand van de Maan (Shape of the Moon) produced by Scarabeefilms
- 2006 Aladi (documentary for Surinam television i.c.w. Pim de la Parra)
- 2006 Promised Paradise (documentary for VPRO television) produced by Scarabeefilms
- 2006 In My Fathers Country (Australian documentary by Tom Murray in which Retel Helmrich was the Director of Photography)
- 2007 Beautiful Crazy (Taiwanese fiction film by Chi Yuen Lee in which Retel Helmrich was the Director of Photography)
- 2009 Contract Pensions: Djangan Loepah (documentary from Hetty Naaijkens-Retel Helmrich in which Leonard Retel Helmrich was the Director of Photography) produced by Scarabeefilms
- 2009 The Burning Season (Australian documentary by Cathy Henkel in which Retel Helmrich was the Director of Photography)
- 2009 Nuclear Underground in New Mexico USA (documentary by Peter Galison and Rob Moss in which Leonard Retel Helmrich was the Director of Photography)
- 2010 Stand van de Sterren (Position Among the Stars) produced by Scarabeefilms
- 2013 Raw Herring(documentary about Dutch traditional fisherman) Produced by In-Soo Productions
- 2017 The Long Season (documentary about Syrian refugees in Libanon) produced by Pieter van Huystee Productions

== Awards ==
- 1990: Special jury award Best Artist-Profile of the International Golden Gate film festival of San Francisco 1992 for Moving Objects
- 1994: Nomination New Media Award Top Television München for Jemand auf der Treppe
- 2001: Eye of the Day (Stand van de Zon)
  - Audience Award Visions du Réel Nyon 2002
  - Award Prix SRG SSR Idée Suisse 2002
  - Grand Prix of the Jury Maremma Doc Festival Pal Mares 2002
  - Audience Award 7th International Film Festival Split 2002
  - Gouden Beeld (Golden Image) for best TV-documentary 2003
- 2003: Nomination Gouden Kalf (Golden Calf) for best documentary 2004 for Flight from Heaven
- 2004: Shape of the Moon (Stand van de Maan)
  - Opening film IDFA, Amsterdam 2004
  - Grand Joris Ivens Award IDFA, Amsterdam 2004
  - World Cinema Jury Prize Documentary Sundance Film festival 2005, USA
  - Best Cinematography Award International Documentary Film festival Chicago 2005, USA
  - Opening film International Film Festival Bermuda 2005
  - Grand Jury Award Full Frame USA
  - Crystal Film Award the Netherlands
  - Asja.biz Prize – Best Documentary 2005 Cinemambiente Environmental Film Festival Turin, Italy
  - Audience Award Rencontres Documentary Film festival Montréal 2005, Canada'
- 2006: Grand Golden Dhow Best Documentary award at the Zanzibar International Film festival 2006 for Promised Paradise
- 2010: Position Among the Stars (Stand van de Sterren)
  - Opening film IDFA, Amsterdam 2010
  - Grand VPRO/IDFA Award, Amsterdam 2010
  - Award Best Dutch Documentary, Amsterdam 2010
  - World Cinema Documentary Special Jury Prize Sundance Film festival 2011
  - Grand Big Stamp Award ZagrebDocs Croatia 2011
  - Best Cinematography Award at the A.F.I World Peace Initiative Cannes Film Festival 2016 for Tagor's Natir Puja by Karl Bardosh
- 2017: Best Dutch Documentary at IDFA for The Long Season
- 2018: Royal Award from the King Willem-Alexander of the Netherlands. From June 5, 2018, Leonard Retel Helmrich is a Knight in the Order of the Netherlands Lion.
