= Expeditie Robinson 2023 =

- Season 25
- Presented by: Nicolette Kluijver; Art Rooijakkers
- No. of days: 35
- No. of castaways: 20
- Winner: Willem Voogd
- Runners-up: Guido Spek; Ilse Paulis
- Location: Langkawi, Malaysia

Release
- Original network: RTL 4
- Original release: 2 September – 17 December 2023

Season chronology
- ← Previous; 2022 Next → 2024

Expeditie Robinson 2023 is the twenty-fifth season of the Dutch reality television series Expeditie Robinson. This season returns to Langkawi, Malaysia where 20 Dutch celebrities compete in tribes to win challenges and avoid elimination to try and win the title of Robinson 2023. The season is presented by Nicolette Kluijver and for the first time since All Stars, Art Rooijakkers. The season premiered on 2 September 2023 on RTL 4.

== Contestants ==
List of Expeditie Robinson 2023 contestants
Contestant	Tribe				Main game (Note: Elimination order is based on when the contestant was voted out at Tribal Council.)		Redemption Island	
Contestant	Original	Post-entry	Swapped	Merged	Finish	Day	Finish	Day
Eva Simons; Returned to game	North Team				1st voted out	Day 1	1st returnee	Day 5
Iris van Lunenburg; 38, TV presenter	South Team				2nd voted out	Day 1	Lost duel 1	Day 8
Hassan Slaby; 36, Actor	South Team				Quit	Day 2		
Mark Baanders; Returned to game	South Team				3rd voted out	Day 4	2nd returnee	Day 18
Irene van de Laar; 54, TV presenter	North Team	North Team			4th voted out	Day 6	Lost duel 5	Day 16
Frits Wester; 61, Journalist	North Team	North Team			5th voted out	Day 8	Lost duel 2	Day 10
Roosmarijn Wind; 27, Actress	North Team	North Team			6th voted out	Day 10	Lost duel 3	Day 12
Chelsey Weimar; 26, Model	North Team	North Team	North Team		7th voted out	Day 12	Lost duel 4	Day 14
Eva Simons; 39, Singer	North Team	South Team	North Team		8th voted out	Day 14	Lost duel 6	Day 18
Armand Rosbak; 28, Actor	North Team	North Team	South Team		Medically evacuated	Day 17		
Jaimie Vaes; Returned to game	South Team	South Team	North Team		9th voted out	Day 17	3rd returnee	Day 18
Roberta Pagnier; 44, TV chef	South Team	South Team	South Team		Eliminated	Day 18		
Jaimie Vaes; 33, TV personality	South Team	South Team	North Team	Chawi	Quit	Day 20		
Maxim Froger; 27, Singer	South Team	South Team	North Team	Chawi	10th voted out	Day 25		
Krista Arriëns; 34, TV presenter	South Team	South Team	North Team	Chawi	11th voted out	Day 27		
Iris Enthoven; 29, YouTuber	North Team	North Team	South Team	Chawi	12th voted out	Day 28		
Radmilo Soda; 51, Personal trainer	North Team	North Team	North Team	Chawi	Quit	Day 28		
Floris Göbel; 25, TV presenter	North Team	North Team	North Team	Chawi	13th voted out	Day 32		
Jochen Otten; 49, Comedian	South Team	South Team	South Team	Chawi	Eliminated	Day 34		
Mark Baanders; 25, Journalist	South Team	None		Chawi	Eliminated	Day 34		
Ilse Paulis; 29, Oarswoman	South Team	South Team	South Team	Chawi	2nd runner-up	Day 35		
Guido Spek; 33, Actor	North Team	North Team	South Team	Chawi	Runner-up	Day 35		
Willem Voogd; 34, Actor	South Team	South Team	South Team	Chawi	Robinson	Day 35		

== Season summary ==
Expeditie Robinson 2023 summary
Episode		Redemption Island		Challenge winner(s)		Voted out		
No.	Air date	Winner	Eliminated	Reward	Immunity	Tribe	Player	Day
1	September 2, 2023	None		South Team	None	North Team	Eva	Day 1
1	September 2, 2023	None		South Team	None	South Team	Iris v. L.	Day 1
2	September 3, 2023	None		None	North Team	South Team	Slaby (Note: Quit on Day 2.)	Day 2
2	September 3, 2023	None		None	North Team	South Team	Mark	Day 4
3	September 10, 2023	Eva (Note: After Slaby quit due to injury, there was a spare spot in the South Team. Iris v. L. and Eva played a duel which determined who would take that spot. Eva won.)	Iris v. L.	None	South Team	North Team	Irene	Day 6
4	September 17, 2023	Irene	Iris v. L.	South Team		North Team	Frits	Day 8
5	September 24, 2023	Mark	Frits	South Team		North Team	Roosmarijn	Day 10
6	October 1, 2023	Mark	Roosmarijn	South Team		North Team	Chelsey	Day 12
7	October 8, 2023	Mark	Chelsey	South Team		North Team	Eva	Day 14
8	October 15, 2023	Eva	Irene	South Team		South Team	Armand (Note: Evacuated on Day 17.)	Day 17
8	October 15, 2023	Eva	Irene	South Team		North Team	Jaimie	Day 17
9	October 22, 2023	Mark	Eva	Willem	None	None	Roberta	Day 18
9	October 22, 2023	Mark	Jaimie	Willem	None	None	Roberta	Day 18
9	October 22, 2023	Jaimie	Eva	Willem	None	None	Roberta	Day 18
10	October 29, 2023			Ilse [Iris E., Krista]		Chawi	Jaimie (Note: Quit on Day 20.)	Day 20
10	October 29, 2023			Ilse [Iris E., Krista]		Chawi	None (Note: No elimination due to previous quit.)	
11	November 5, 2023			Jochen [Guido, Maxim]		Chawi	Maxim	Day 25
12	November 12, 2023			Jochen [Floris, Radmilo]		Chawi	Krista	Day 27
13	November 19, 2023			Mark [Iris E., Willem]		Chawi	Iris E.	Day 28
13	November 19, 2023			Mark [Iris E., Willem]		Chawi	Radmilo (Note: Radmilo requested to be voted out. The opposite alliance instead decided to send Iris E. home. As a result, Iris E. was voted out, and Radmilo quit immediately after.)	Day 28
14	November 26, 2023			Willem [Floris, Guido]		Chawi	None (Note: No elimination due to previous quit.)	
15	December 3, 2023			Guido [Floris, Mark]		Chawi	Floris	Day 32
16	December 10, 2023			Willem, Guido, Ilse		Chawi	Jochen	Day 34
16	December 10, 2023			Willem, Guido, Ilse		Chawi	Mark	Day 34
17	December 17, 2023			Willem		Chawi	Ilse	Day 35
17	December 17, 2023			Willem		Chawi	Guido	Day 35

== Voting history ==
	Original tribes				Post-entry tribes				Swapped tribes					None	Merged tribe																		
Episode	1		2		3	4	5		6		7	8		9	10			11		12			13				14	15				16	17
Day	1		2	4	6	8	10		12		14	17		18	20	21		25		27			28				30	32				34	35
Tribe	North	South	South	South	North	North	North		North		North	South	North	None	Chawi	Chawi		Chawi		Chawi			Chawi			Chawi	Chawi	Chawi				Chawi	Chawi
Voted out	Eva	Iris v. L.	Slaby	Mark	Irene	Frits	Roosmarijn & Armand	Roosmarijn	Tie	Chelsey	Eva	Armand	Jaimie	Roberta	Jaimie	Krista (Note: Krista received the most votes at Tribal Council. However, due to Jaimie leaving the competition the day before, Krista's elimination was nullified. Instead, Krista received one penalty vote against her at the next Tribal Council.)		Maxim		Krista			Iris E.			Radmilo	Mark (Note: Mark received the most votes at Tribal Council. However, due to Radmilo leaving the competition the episode before, Mark's elimination was nullified. Instead, Mark received one penalty vote against him at the next Tribal Council.)	Floris				Jochen, Mark	Ilse, Guido
Votes	2-0 (Note: Two representatives had to choose a member from their team to send to Redemption Island.)	2-0 (Note: Two representatives had to choose a member from their team to send to Redemption Island.)	None	5-2-1	5-4	7-1	6-1	None (Note: After Roosmarijn played her Peluang advantage, she had to participate in a task like the Monty Hall problem. If she chose correctly, she had to play a challenge against the person with the second most votes. She chose correctly, played a challenge against Armand.)	1-1-0	None (Note: Because Eva played an immunity coin on herself, she negated five votes against her. As the remainder of the votes resulted in a tie, Chelsey and Floris had to play a challenge.)	5-1	None	3-2	None	None	6-4		6-5		7-4			7-4			None	3-2	4-0-0 (Note: Mark played an immunity coin, cancelling out 3 votes. Additionally, Ilse played an immunity coin, which she got from Willem, cancelling out 9 votes.)				None (Note: The non-immune castaways competed in a sudden-death challenge, where the two players who lost would be automatically eliminated.)	None (Note: The castaways competed in a final challenge, where the winner would be titled the Sole Survivor.)
Voter	Vote													Challenge	Vote																	Challenge	
Willem		Iris v. L.		Jaimie										Won		Maxim		Maxim		Radmilo			Iris E.		Iris E.		Mark	~~Mark~~		~~Mark~~		Immune	Won
Guido	None				Irene	Frits	Roosmarijn							Safe		Krista		Maxim		None (Note: For losing the immunity challenge, Iris E. lost her right to vote. However, she could regain it via a duel. The winner of the immunity challenge, Jochen, had to choose Iris E.'s opponent. Jochen chose Guido. As Iris E. won the duel, she regained her right to vote, and Guido's vote transferred to her, causing Guido to lose his right to vote.)			Radmilo				Ilse	~~Ilse~~		~~Ilse~~	~~Ilse~~	Won	Lost
Ilse		None		Mark										Safe		Maxim		Maxim		Radmilo			Iris E.		Iris E.		Mark	Floris	Floris	Floris	Floris	Won	Lost
Mark		None		Willem												None (Note: For losing the immunity challenge, Krista lost her right to vote. However, she could regain it via a duel. The winner of the immunity challenge, Ilse, had to choose Krista's opponent. Ilse chose Mark. As Krista won the duel, she regained her right to vote, and Mark's vote transferred to her, causing Mark to lose his right to vote.)		Krista		Krista			Radmilo				None (Note: For losing the immunity challenge, Mark lost his right to vote. However, he could regain it via a duel. The winner of the immunity challenge, Willem, had to choose Mark's opponent. Willem chose Ilse. As Ilse. won the duel, Mark's vote transferred to her, causing Mark to lose his right to vote.)	~~Ilse~~		~~Ilse~~	~~Ilse~~	Lost	
Jochen		None		Jaimie										Safe		Maxim		Maxim		Radmilo			Iris E.	Iris E.	Iris E.		Mark	None (Note: For losing the immunity challenge, Ilse lost her right to vote. However, she could regain it via a duel. The winner of the immunity challenge, Guido, had to choose Irlse's opponent. Guido chose Jochen. As Ilse won the duel, she regained her right to vote, and Jochen's vote transferred to her, causing Jochen to lose his right to vote.)				Lost	
Floris	None				Irene	Frits	Roosmarijn		~~Eva~~	Won	Eva		Jaimie	Safe		Krista		Krista		Krista			Radmilo				Ilse	~~Ilse~~		~~Ilse~~	~~Ilse~~		
Radmilo	None				Irene	Frits	Roosmarijn		~~Eva~~		Eva		Jaimie	Safe		Krista		Krista		Krista	Krista	Krista	None (Note: For losing the immunity challenge, Jochen lost his right to vote. However, he could regain it via a duel. The winner of the immunity challenge, Mark, had to choose Jochen's opponent. Mark chose Radmilo. As Jochen won the duel, he regained his right to vote, and Radmilo's vote transferred to him, causing Radmilo to lose his right to vote.)			Quit							
Iris E.	None				Frits	Frits	Roosmarijn							Safe		Krista		None (Note: For losing the immunity challenge, Willem lost his right to vote. However, he could regain it via a duel. The winner of the immunity challenge, Jochen, had to choose Willem's opponent. Jochen chose Iris E. As Willem won the duel, he regained his right to vote, and Iris E.'s vote transferred to him, causing Iris E. to lose her right to vote.)		Krista		Krista	Radmilo										
Krista		Iris v. L.		Mark					~~Eva~~		Eva		Jaimie	Safe		Maxim		Maxim	Maxim	Radmilo													
Maxim		None		Mark					~~Eva~~		Eva		Krista	Safe		Krista	Krista	Krista															
Jaimie		None		Mark					Floris		Eva		Krista		Quit																		
Roberta		None		Mark										Lost																			
Armand	None				Irene	Frits	Roosmarijn	Won				Evacuated																					
Eva	None								Chelsey		Jaimie																						
Chelsey	Eva				Frits	Frits	Roosmarijn		~~Eva~~	Lost																							
Roosmarijn	None				Frits	Frits	Armand	Lost																									
Frits	Eva				Irene	Roosmarijn																											
Irene	None				Frits																												
Slaby		None	Quit																														
Iris v. L.		None																															
Penalty																		Krista										~~Mark~~					
