= Joop van den Berg =

Dutch politician (1941–2023)

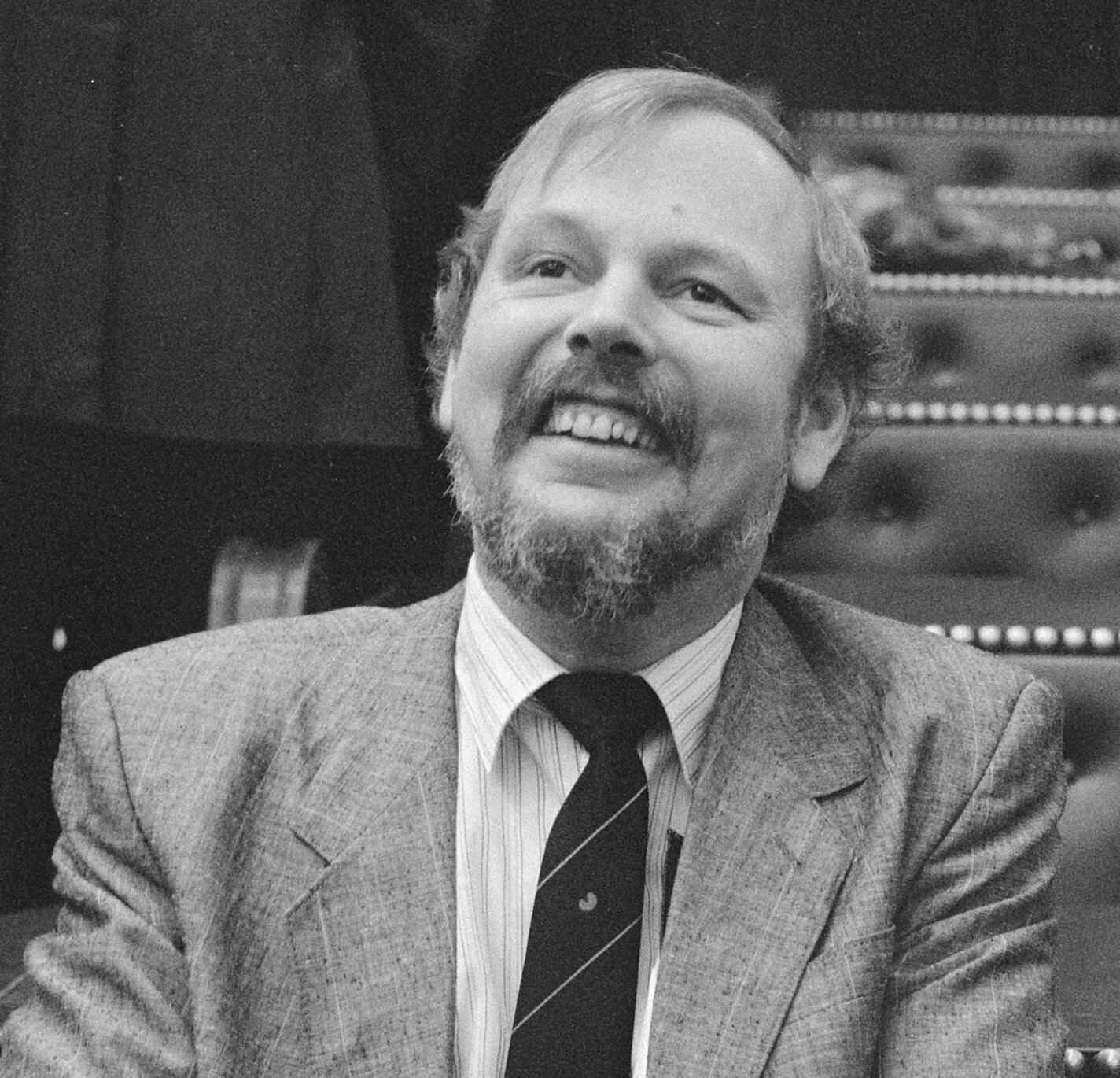
- Van den Berg (left) in 1988

Member of the House of Representatives of the Netherlands
- In office 21 January 1988 – 17 May 1994

Personal details
- Born: Jochum Hendrik van den Berg; 8 June 1941 Bartlehiem, German-occupied Netherlands
- Died: 4 May 2023 (aged 81) Heerenveen, Netherlands
- Party: PSP (until 1975); PvdA (1975–2023)

Jochum Hendrik "Joop" van den Berg (8 June 1941 – 4 May 2023) was a Dutch politician. A member of the Labour Party, he served in the House of Representatives from 1988 to 1994.

Van den Berg died in Heerenveen on 4 May 2023, at the age of 81.
