= Bert Peletier =

Dutch mathematician (1937–2023)

Lambertus Adrianus "Bert" Peletier (29 March 1937 – 16 December 2023) was a Dutch mathematician. He was a professor of analysis and applied mathematics at Leiden University from 1977 until his retirement in 2002.

== Life ==
Lambertus Adrianus Peletier was born on 9 March 1937 in Rijswijk. His grandfather Benjamin Broers was a socialist Dutch minister in the Dutch Reformed Church, who lived with his family during World War II. Peletier's father was an engineer working for Shell plc and took him to his laboratory. He was interested in technique from a young age and desired to pursue a technical study. His maths teacher inspired him to study physics.

Peletier thus studied theoretical physics at Delft University of Technology. After graduating, Peletier had the opportunity to study one year at the Massachusetts Institute of Technology and became inspired by academic life. In 1967 he obtained his PhD at Eindhoven University of Technology, with a thesis titled: "On a class of wave equations". He subsequently spent time abroad at the University of Sussex and University of Minnesota and became more inspired by applied mathematics. In 1977 he became professor of analysis and applied mathematics at Leiden University. He retired in 2002.

His expertise lay in the field of nonlinear analysis. During the latter part of his career, in the late 1990s, he applied mathematics for the development of medicine. He especially focused on the latter after his retirement and worked intensively with pharmacologists. In 1995 he was one of the founders of the Lorentz Center, an institute for the organization of interactive workshops in the sciences.

Peletier was elected a member of the Academia Europaea in 1989. He was elected a member of Royal Netherlands Academy of Arts and Sciences in 1999. Peletier was elected a Fellow of the Society for Industrial and Applied Mathematics in 2009. In April 2013 Peletier was made a Knight in the Order of the Netherlands Lion.

Peletier died in Leiden on 16 December 2023, at the age of 86.
