= Henk Tiesinga =

Dutch politician (1949–2023)

Member of the Senate of the Netherlands
- In office 3 November 2009 – 7 August 2011

Personal details
- Born: 1949
- Died: 12 August 2023 (aged 73–74)
- Party: CDA
- Education: Wageningen University & Research; Open University of the Netherlands

Henk Tiesinga (1949 – 12 August 2023) was a Dutch politician. A member of the Christian Democratic Appeal, he served in the Senate from 2009 to 2011.

Tiesinga died on 12 August 2023.
