= 10:32 =

1966 film

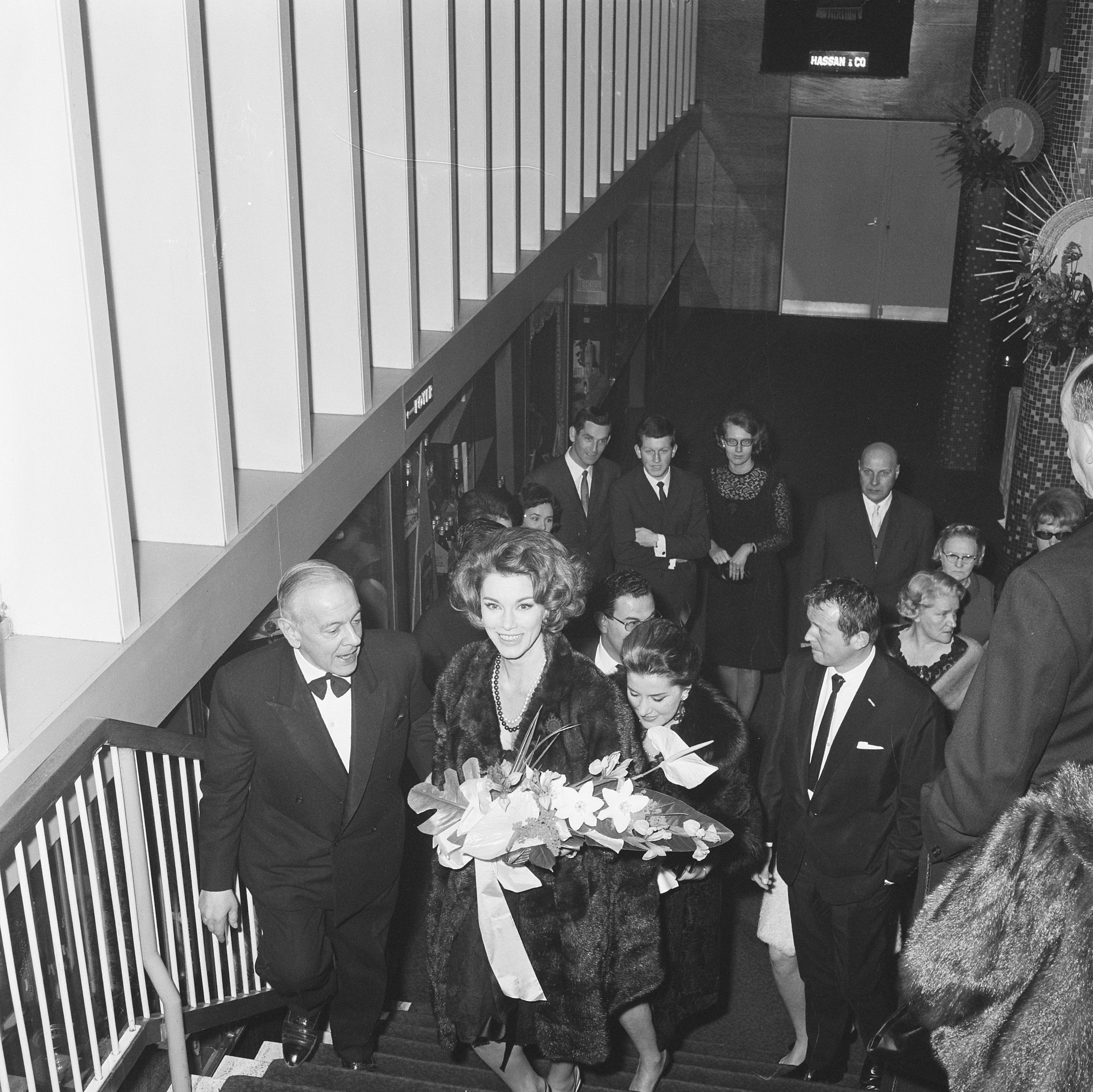
- Linda Christian at the opening night of 10:32 in Rotterdam (1966)
- Directed by: Arthur Dreifuss
- Written by: Arthur Dreifuss; Dity Oorthuys
- Produced by: Joop Landré
- Cinematography: Eduard van der Enden
- Edited by: Dick Visser
- Music by: Dolf van der Linden
- Production company: NFM
- Release date: 27 January 1966 (Netherlands)
- Running time: 96 minutes
- Country: Netherlands
- Language: Dutch
- Budget: NLG 540,000 (estimated)
- Box office: NLG 60,000 (Netherlands)

10:32 is a 1966 Dutch film by Arthur Dreifuss, starring Linda Christian, Eric Schneider and Bob de Lange. It is the debut of actress Linda van Dyck.

== Plot ==
During a visit to a nightclub, the young painter Peter Hartman tries to slip out unnoticed through the restroom to visit the office of lawyer Martens, the elderly, wealthy husband of Ellen Martens, and who pays more attention to his work than to his wife. While Peter is searching through Martens’ belongings in his office, he is surprised by a police raid. Martens's body is found lying on the floor next to him; Peter is the prime suspect. Inspectors Stroomer and Hofland are convinced of his guilt, but Peter refuses to say a word. Peter and Ellen claim they don't know each other, but when Stroomer finds a portrait of Ellen in Peter's apartment, he knows they're lying.

Ellen is taken back to the station for questioning. In flashbacks, she tells her story. She met Peter on the street while visiting art dealer Blom. He followed her through the city, and at her country house, he blackmailed her with compromising photos of her. Ellen did not want her husband to see these photos and offered him 1,000 guilders. However, he demanded her help in breaking into her husband's safe and pressured her to pose nude for a painting while constantly harassing her in public. Eventually, Ellen had had enough and broke into his apartment, looking for the painting and the photo negative, but she was caught by Peter. He threatened to hang her nude portrait in a shop window unless she helped him break into the safe immediately. While he was on his way there, she called the police, after which he was arrested.

Inspector Stroomer sets out to investigate whether Ellen's story holds up. After visiting art dealer Blom, he concludes that Ellen was not telling the truth. Furthermore, he learns from Van Dijk, a business partner of the Martens family, that Ellen and Peter were having an affair. The blackmail photo Ellen mentioned also turns out not to be a compromising one. Finally, he discovers that the time and location from which Ellen called the police are questionable. Stroomer returns to the station, where he brings up the affair. Peter, who until now had refused to say a word in order to protect Ellen, finally tells his side of the story.

He claims that Ellen was the one who pursued him and that there was never any blackmail involved. According to him, she had suggested to him to paint a nude portrait of her. This led to a relationship, which came to an abrupt end when Ellen decided to remain faithful to her husband. But shortly thereafter, she contacted him again and told him she had found a gun in her husband's room. Since then, she had been afraid he would kill her. Ellen asked Peter for help breaking into Martens’ safe, which contained documents that could help her with a divorce. While searching for these documents, Peter was surprised by the police, and it was only then that he saw Martens’ body for the first time.

Further investigation reveals the “blackmail photo” was taken with the same camera as an intimate vacation snapshot of Ellen and Van Dijk. Although it is unclear whether Ellen had an affair with Van Dijk voluntarily or under duress, it becomes clear that Martens was murdered by Van Dijk, who subsequently conspired with Ellen to frame her lover, Peter, for the murder.

== Cast ==
- Linda Christian as Ellen Martens
- Bob de Lange as Inspector Stroomer
- Eric Schneider as Peter Hartman
- Wim van den Brink as Martens
- Wim de Haas as van Dijk
- Rudi West as Inspector Hofland
- Gerard de Groot as Anton Smit
- Linda van Dyck as Marijke
- Teddy Schaank as Saleswoman
- Lex Goudsmit as Max
- Louis Borel as Seller Blom

== Production ==
Producer Joop Landré had received a large sum of money from millionaire Veder for film production. 10.32 was the fifth and final project financed with these funds. Hoping to make a professional thriller, he hired an American director and leading actress. If the film received good reviews, it would be dubbed into English for the international market. The director, Arthur Dreifuss, was dissatisfied with the original script, in which the murder was committed by the young painter, and during the rewrites, a rift eventually developed with Leo Derksen, the writer of the original story. The film has all the stylistic hallmarks of a film noir and marked the debut of actress Linda van Dyck.

After the film's release, Landré lamented he had not been bold enough, stating that he "should have put Linda Christian completely naked on screen; then there would have been a lot more buzz about it. There should have been a lot more sex in it”. The film grossed 60,000 guilders out of a budget of 540,000 guilders, and marked the end of Landré's career as a producer.

== Reception ==
10.32 premiered on January 27, 1966, at Theater Lumiere in Rotterdam. Toon Hermans, State Secretary Cees Egas, Maarten Vrolijk, and the Bishop of Rotterdam, Martinus Jansen, were among the many guests. After the showing, the actors received a long standing ovation. The film received mostly positive reviews, but was not a success at the box-office. The performances of Bob de Lange and Eric Schneider were praised by the press, but they were less enthusiastic about Linda Christian’s acting. The film contains an erotic scene in which Linda Christian's breasts are covered by a sheer dress, ending two centimeters above her nipples. “Linda's semi-nude scene is not titilating in the slightest,” wrote Het Parool.

De Tijd called it a poor police film, and criticized its "outdated style of filmmaking". De Telegraaf praised "Dreifuss' solid craftsmanship" and called it "an unpretentious entertainment film". The Twentsch Dagblad was very enthusiastic and called it “One of the most successful Dutch films ever made”. The then-new film magazine Skoop gave the film a failing grade. The Catholic film censorship board judged the film's production as "predominantly routine and competent". Het Parool called the film a "B-movie" but praised Bob de Lange and Eric Schneider's performances. The Algemeen Dagblad called it “Unpretentious entertainment at an acceptable level. A well-structured and tightly woven narrative that slowly builds toward a decidedly not unpleasant conclusion", and praised Eddy van den Ende's camerawork. The Nieuwsblad van het Noorden wrote: “Dreifuss deliberately set out to make a film that could captivate a large audience—including audiences outside the Netherlands—for an hour and a half. An ambition in which he has fully succeeded.”
