= Anneke Uittenbosch =

Dutch harpsichordist (1930–2023)

- Born: 11 March 1930; Haarlem, Netherlands
- Died: 25 September 2023 (aged 93); Amsterdam, Netherlands
- Education: Conservatorium van Amsterdam
- Occupation: Harpsichordist

Anneke Uittenbosch (11 March 1930 – 25 September 2023) was a Dutch harpsichordist.

== Biography ==
Born in Haarlem on 11 March 1930, Uittenbosch first took piano lessons from her father. She took Gustav Leonhardt's harpsichord class at the Conservatorium van Amsterdam. In the late 1960s, she taught harpsichord at the Maastricht Academy of Music. She recorded Leonhardt Consort with Gustav Leonhardt and Ton Koopman. With her husband, baritone Lieuwe Visser, she accompanied choral compositions from the 17th and 18th centuries while on tour in the United States. Throughout her career, she was primarily devoted to the works of Dutch organist Jan Pieterszoon Sweelinck.

Anneke Uittenbosch died in Amsterdam on 25 September 2023, at the age of 93.
