= Hart van Nederland =

Dutch television programme

- Genre: Tabloid newsmagazine, regional news
- Created by: Marck Feller, Jean Mentens
- Theme music composer: Bernhard Joosten (1995–2000) Piet Veenstra and Hans Bos (Soundscape) (2000–2006) Martijn Schimmer (2006–2019) Jeroen Kuitenbrouwer, Ward Henselmans (KH Music, Utrecht) (2019–present)
- Opening theme: Custom
- Country of origin: Netherlands
- Original language: Dutch

Production
- Production locations: Media Park, Hilversum
- Production company: Cameo Media (1995–2001) SBS Productions (2001–present)

Original release
- Network: SBS6
- Release: August 29, 1995 – present

Hart van Nederland (Heart of the Netherlands) is a tabloid newsmagazine programme airing on SBS6 since 1995. It is the station's longest-running programme. The show focuses on in-depth coverage of regional and local news from across the Netherlands, as well as reports on lifestyles and cultural traditions in and around the country.

== History ==
=== 1990s ===
Hart van Nederland's first broadcast aired on August 29, 1995, one day after the launch of SBS6. The idea of a programme focused on regional news was attributed to SBS6 founding general director, journalist Fons van Westerloo, and its programme director, Bart in 't Hout. Lacking the resources to develop a full-scale news department to rivalize with the NOS and RTL, Van Westerloo proposed Marck Feller and Jean Mentens, partners of independent production company Cameo Media, to produce a news programme composed exclusively of regional and local news, featuring reports and voxpops. Feller and Mentens had already conceived the idea eight years before, but the proposal was turned down by existing broadcasters.

The show initially aired at 22:00 during its first months on air, however, it was moved to the 22.30 timeslot at the beginning of January 1996. The show's first presenters were Milika Peterzon and Gallyon van Vessem, with Cilly Dartell and Carine Holties joining soon after. The show had a rocky start, with ratings between 30.000 and 100.000 viewers, which were very low compared to those of its longer-established rivals. In an attempt to increase these figures, an early edition was launched in September, airing initially at 19:50. It was ultimately unsuccessful and it was replaced by a serious newshour to compete with its competitors. However, in the midst of this, the hiring of Albert Verlinde as entertainment reporter, and weatherman Piet Paulusma, as well as its coverage of the 1997 Elfstedentocht, changed the programme's fortunes, and established the show as an alternative to the more serious offers provided by their competitors. Regional TV channels were also given a boost, as Hart van Nederland often shared content with these stations, which also helped with their ratings. By the summer of 2005, when the show celebrated its tenth anniversary, viewing figures reached its peak, averaging 1.6 million viewers in July and peaking at nearly 2 million viewers in some days.

The success of Hart van Nederland did not go unnoticed by the competition, which created similarly focused programs, such as 5 in het Land, NL Net and 4 in het Land. These programs were unable to catch on the show's popularity, and were later promptly canceled. Its competitors also took elements from the show, which were integrated into their serious news programmes.

=== 2000s ===
The show, as it began to thrive, added a Saturday edition in late 1999, and attempted, during 1997, with breakaway windows for news related to specific parts of the country. The breakaway window experiment was not a success, mainly because of budget contraints. In the midst of this, Albert Verlinde left the show in 2001 to join rival RTL, as it prepared to launch a tabloid newsmagazine, but with a different focus to that of Hart van Nederland. Nevertheless, SBS took in-house the production of the programme in 2001, and also began to expand its news programming, with the launch of the opinion-led format Stem van Nederland (2002–2003) and the crime newscast Actienieuws (2004–2006). However, these shows were duly canceled due to disappointing viewing figures and/or excessive production costs. In the opposite, the entertainment news block was spun-off into its own programme, Shownieuws, to great success.

In 2006, as part of a major relaunch, Hart van Nederland brought back an early evening edition. Although it has changed several times its slot to accommodate new programming, it has become moderately successful. The show initially had its own anchor team and a different format emphasizing human interest stories, but soon it became more in line with overall approach of the show.

=== 2010s ===
In 2011, the new owners of SBS6 (Sanoma and Talpa) announced a major revamp for the show. This began with the firing of three of the show's longest-tenured presenters, Milika Peterzon, Cilly Dartell and Maureen du Toi, which generated heavy negative publicity. The show gradually downplayed double-headed presentation and the use of voiceovers to narrate stories, with the show's reporters now being responsible for narrating their stories; they also began to appear on screen during their filmed reports. The full relaunch went on-air on September 24, 2012, with double presentation being permanently replaced by a single presenter, and a more fast-paced and journalistic approach. This included RTL reporter Sandra Schuurhof being hired as new main anchor. The Shownieuws programme also became separated from the overall SBS news service, gaining its own team of presenters and analysts, but still sharing a studio with Hart van Nederland.

The changes proved to be disastrous, as the show lost over 200.000 viewers one year after the relaunch. The show gradually returned to its original presentation style; by mid-August 2013, the show reintroduced double presentation for its early evening edition, with the late edition following suit by December 2014, this time, in preparation for another relaunch, which happened on January 5, 2015. As a result of this, the presentation style went back to a more traditional approach, with the use of a voiceover to narrate stories being brought back.

=== 2020s ===
In June 2020, the show left Amsterdam and moved to Talpa Network's headquarters at the Media Park in Hilversum. As a result, the show's presentation was refreshed, with new graphics and music, as well as a new virtual reality studio. The show also hired its first male presenters, Maarten Steendam and Wolter Klok; hitherto, the show was well known for having only female newsreaders. The show went back, for a time, to single presentation for its evening edition, only to bring back double-headed presentation by early 2021. Since January 1, 2021, the show also has a morning news service, with 15-minute updates being aired on weekdays from 6:30 and weekends from 7:00.

== Format ==
The show is known for its tabloid style and its in-depth coverage of regional and local news, as well as cultural traditions and lifestyles across the Netherlands. Most times, every edition is presented by two presenters (usually, a pair of female presenters), although, during some weekends and holidays, and during the morning news service, the editions are presented by a single anchor. Reports are usually read by a voiceover, as opposed to a reporter, and sometimes, in the case of brief news, by the newsreaders. For many years, Arno Lubbinge has been the show's lead voiceover, when he is away, he is replaced by Robert Feller.

For many years, the show ended with a weather report presented by Piet Paulusma, often done outdoors. Paulusma was known for his humorous approach and for his West Frisian sign-off oant moarn (until tomorrow). He left the show in December 2019 as part of a restructuring of SBS' weather department, he would move to public broadcaster Omroep MAX shortly thereafter. Since January 2020, the weather forecasts are done under the umbrella name Weer.nl, which is also the name of Talpa's radio and web weather services, bought from MeteoGroup in 2019. The website's meteorologists provide the weather forecasts from a separate studio in the Media Park complex (at the former NCRV headquarters).
