= Skam NL =

Dutch teen drama television series (2018–2019)

- Also known as: Skam Dutch; Skam Netherlands
- Genre: Teen drama
- Created by: Julie Andem
- Developed by: Bobbie Koek
- Screenplay by: Ashgan El-Hamus
- Directed by: Bobbie Koek; Isabel Lamberti; Floor van der Meulen
- Starring: Suus de Nies; Zoë Love Smith; Bo van Borssum Waalkes; Sara Calmeijer Meijburg; Sara Awin; Melisa Diktas; Reiky de Valk; Monk Dagelet; Florian Regtien; Josep Hendrikx
- Composer: Bo Koek
- Country of origin: Netherlands
- Original language: Dutch
- No. of seasons: 2
- No. of episodes: 21

Production
- Production locations: Utrecht, Netherlands
- Cinematography: Jeroen Kiers; Sam Du Pon
- Running time: 15–23 minutes
- Production companies: NTR; Beta Film

Original release
- Network: NPO 3
- Release: 16 September 2018 – 4 June 2019

Skam NL (also known as Skam Dutch or Skam Netherlands; often stylized in all caps) is a Dutch teen drama television series based on the Norwegian television series Skam. It was broadcast by NPO 3 from 16 September 2018 to 4 June 2019.

== Plot ==
Skam NL follows the daily life of high school students at St-Gregorius College in Utrecht and the various problems they face. The plot of each season focuses around a different central character and particular themes. Each adaptation of the original series follows a similar storyline, with the first season focusing on Isa Keijser (the counterpart of Skam's Eva Kviig Mohn), and the second on Liv Reijners (the counterpart of Noora Amalie Sætre).

== Cast and characters ==
Actor	Character	Based on		
Actor	Character	Based on	Season 1	Season 2
Central characters
Suus de Nies	Isa Keijser	Eva Kviig Mohn	Central	Main
Zoë Love Smith	Liv Reijners	Noora Amalie Sætre	Main	Central
Main characters
Bo van Borssum Waalkes	Engel Beekman	Vilde Hellerud Lien	Main	Main
Sara Calmeijer Meijburg	Janna Mertens	Christina "Chris" Berg	Main	Main
Sara Awin	Imaan Elami	Sana Bakkoush	Main	
Melisa Diktas	Esra Aydin	Linn Larsen Hansen		Main
Melisa Diktas	Esra Aydin	Sana Bakkoush		Main
Reiky de Valk	Kes de Beus	Jonas Noah Vasquez	Main	Recurring
Monk Dagelet	Noah Boom	William Magnusson	Recurring	Main
Florian Regtien	Lucas van der Heijden	Isak Valtersen	Main	Recurring
Josep Hendrikx	Ralph Hansen	Eskild Tryggvasson		Main
Recurring and guest characters
Hadjja Fatmata Tinggel Bah	Olivia	Ingrid Theis Gaupseth	Recurring	Recurring
Silver van Sprundel	Gijs Hartveld	Christoffer "Penetrator-Chris" Schistad	Recurring	Recurring
Aida Gai	Tess	Sara Nørstelien	Recurring	Guest
Lina Cohen	Anna	Iben Sandberg	Recurring	Recurring
Noah Canales	Jayden School	Elias	Recurring	Recurring
Lewis Ramos	Micha		Recurring	Recurring
Dana Nechushtan	Mama Isa	Mama Eva	Recurring	
Maarten van Hinte	Father Liv	Father Noora		Recurring
Jurriaan van Seters	Morris Boom	Nikolai Magnusson		Recurring
Marlijn van der Veen	Marie van Aspen	Mari Aspeflaten		Recurring
Carl Martin Eggesbø	Eskild Tryggvasson			Guest

== Episodes ==
=== Series overview ===
Season	Episodes	Originally released		
Season	Episodes	First released	Last released	Network
1	11	September 16, 2018	November 25, 2018	NPO 3
2	10	March 26, 2019	June 4, 2019	NPO 3

=== Season 1 ===
Season 1 comprised 11 episodes. Isa Keijser is the central character and the season focuses on her relationship with her boyfriend Kes, as well as themes of loneliness, identity, and friendship.

No. overall	No. in season	Title	Duration	Original release date
1	1	"Episode 1" (Aflevering 1)	20 min	September 16, 2018
2	2	"Episode 2" (Aflevering 2)	22 min	September 23, 2018
3	3	"Episode 3" (Aflevering 3)	15 min	September 30, 2018
4	4	"Episode 4" (Aflevering 4)	17 min	October 7, 2018
5	5	"Episode 5" (Aflevering 5)	17 min	October 14, 2018
6	6	"Episode 6" (Aflevering 6)	19 min	October 21, 2018
7	7	"Episode 7" (Aflevering 7)	17 min	October 28, 2018
8	8	"Episode 8" (Aflevering 8)	19 min	November 4, 2018
9	9	"Episode 9" (Aflevering 9)	17 min	November 11, 2018
10	10	"Episode 10" (Aflevering 10)	17 min	November 18, 2018
11	11	"Episode 11" (Aflevering 11)	19 min	November 25, 2018

=== Season 2 ===
Season 2 comprised 10 episodes. Liv Reijners is the central character and the season focuses on her relationship with Noah, a popular boy at school, and themes of friendship, self-image, and sexual abuse.

No. overall	No. in season	Title	Duration	Original release date
12	1	"Episode 1" (Aflevering 1)	17 min	March 26, 2019
13	2	"Episode 2" (Aflevering 2)	15 min	April 2, 2019
14	3	"Episode 3" (Aflevering 3)	20 min	April 9, 2019
15	4	"Episode 4" (Aflevering 4)	19 min	April 16, 2019
16	5	"Episode 5" (Aflevering 5)	19 min	April 23, 2019
17	6	"Episode 6" (Aflevering 6)	17 min	May 7, 2019
18	7	"Episode 7" (Aflevering 7)	23 min	May 14, 2019
19	8	"Episode 8" (Aflevering 8)	23 min	May 21, 2019
20	9	"Episode 9" (Aflevering 9)	21 min	May 28, 2019
21	10	"Episode 10" (Aflevering 10)	22 min	June 4, 2019

== Production ==
In October 2017, The Hollywood Reporter announced that a Dutch adaptation of Skam was in development alongside American, German, French, Spanish, and Italian versions. NTR purchased the remake rights in January 2018. Production for the first season began in July 2018, while the trailer was released in August. A countdown on the series' website revealed the first clip would be released on September 10, 2018, making it the sixth Skam remake to premiere.

In November 2018, the SKAM NL website was updated to confirm a second season. In February 2019, it was confirmed that the second season's first clip would premiere on March 18, and that full episodes would be airing on Tuesdays, a change from the first season, when episodes aired on Sunday nights. An official trailer for the season was released on March 10.

== Cancellation ==
In September 2019, despite the series' popularity, NPO 3 confirmed that the series would not be returning for a third season, citing high production costs.

In 2020, the SKAM NL official Instagram account announced a binge-watching event of the series in light of the COVID-19 pandemic, which many fans believed would lead to a revival of the series, but this was not the case. The series remains available to stream on the official SKAM NL YouTube channel with English subtitles, and on the official NPO 3 website.
