= Cilly Dartell =

Dutch radio and television presenter (1957–2023)

- Dartell in 2010
- Born: Priscilla Maria Regina Veltmeijer; 27 October 1957; Kortenhoef, Netherlands
- Died: 6 December 2023 (aged 66); Amsterdam, Netherlands
- Occupations: Radio presenter; television presenter; actress
- Years active: 1992–2023
- Children: 2

Priscilla Maria Regina Veltmeijer (27 October 1957 – 6 December 2023), known professionally as Cilly Dartell, was a Dutch radio and television presenter and actress. She is best known for presenting the program Hart van Nederland, which she presented from 1996 to 2012, as well as the program Shownieuws.

== Career ==
Dartell performed in theater from 1974 to 1990, first with various cabaret groups and theater companies such as Cabaret Nar. She later switched to musicals. For example, she played a leading role in the Annie M.G. Schmidt musical De dader heeft het gedaan (The perpetrator did it), and she appeared in the musical Grease.

Dartell also recorded numerous commercials, cartoons and documentaries. In 1990, she switched to journalism, but in 1992 she played a guest role in the VARA police series Bureau Kruislaan. Until 1996, she was heard in cultural radio programs on Radio 1 and Radio 2 and she made television programs for the AVRO. In 1996, Dartell left for commercial broadcasting, where she presented Hart van Nederland and Shownieuws for SBS6. She also devised and produced musical specials. From January 2013 to May 2014, she presented the television program Studio MAX Live, together with Frank du Mosch.

== Personal life and death ==
Dartell had been married since 1985 and had two sons. She lived in Florida for several years of her life. In 2020, she announced that, as in 2016, she had been diagnosed with lung cancer. Dartell died on 6 December 2023 from the consequences of this disease. She was 66. Shortly before her death, she returned to the Netherlands from the United States, hoping to be able to obtain euthanasia more easily.
