= Reiky de Valk =

Dutch actor (2000–2023)

- Born: 5 March 2000; Amsterdam, Netherlands
- Died: 24 September 2023 (aged 23)
- Occupation: Actor
- Years active: 2018–2023

Reiky de Valk (5 March 2000 – 24 September 2023) was a Dutch actor. He is best known for his roles as Kes de Beus in the teen drama series Skam NL, Josh in the adventure series Hunter Street, and Thomas in the drama series Dertigers.

== Biography ==
Reiky de Valk was born in Amsterdam on 5 March 2000. He was of Dutch, Vietnamese, and Somali descent; his paternal grandfather was from the Dhulbahante sub-clan in Somalia. He attended the Amsterdamse Jeugdtheaterschool before making his acting debut as Kes de Beus in the teen drama series Skam NL in 2018.

De Valk died by suicide at the age of 23 on 24 September 2023. A memorial, led by actress Nazmiye Oral, was held for him on 30 September in Amsterdam.

== Filmography ==
=== Film ===
Year	Title	Role	Notes	Ref.
2021	Voltooid Verleden Tijd	Florian	Short film	
2021	De Overkammer	Archie	Short film	
2022	#No_Filter	Tyler		
2025	Undecidable (posthumous release)	Arturo Reyes	Short film	

=== Television ===
Year	Title	Role	Notes	Ref.
2018–2019	Skam NL	Kes de Beus	Main role (season 1), recurring role (season 2); 18 episodes	
2021	Onze straat	Ilyas	1 episode	
2021	Hunter Street	Josh	12 episodes	
2021	Follow de SOA	Jacob	8 episodes	
2022	Modern Love Amsterdam	Jack	1 episode	
2023	Hockeyvaders	Yannick El Ghazi	7 episodes	
2023	Dertigers	Thomas	18 episodes	

=== Music videos ===
Year	Title	Artist	Role	Ref.
2022	"De diepte"	S10	Man	
