= Sietse Bosgra =

Dutch political activist (1935–2023)

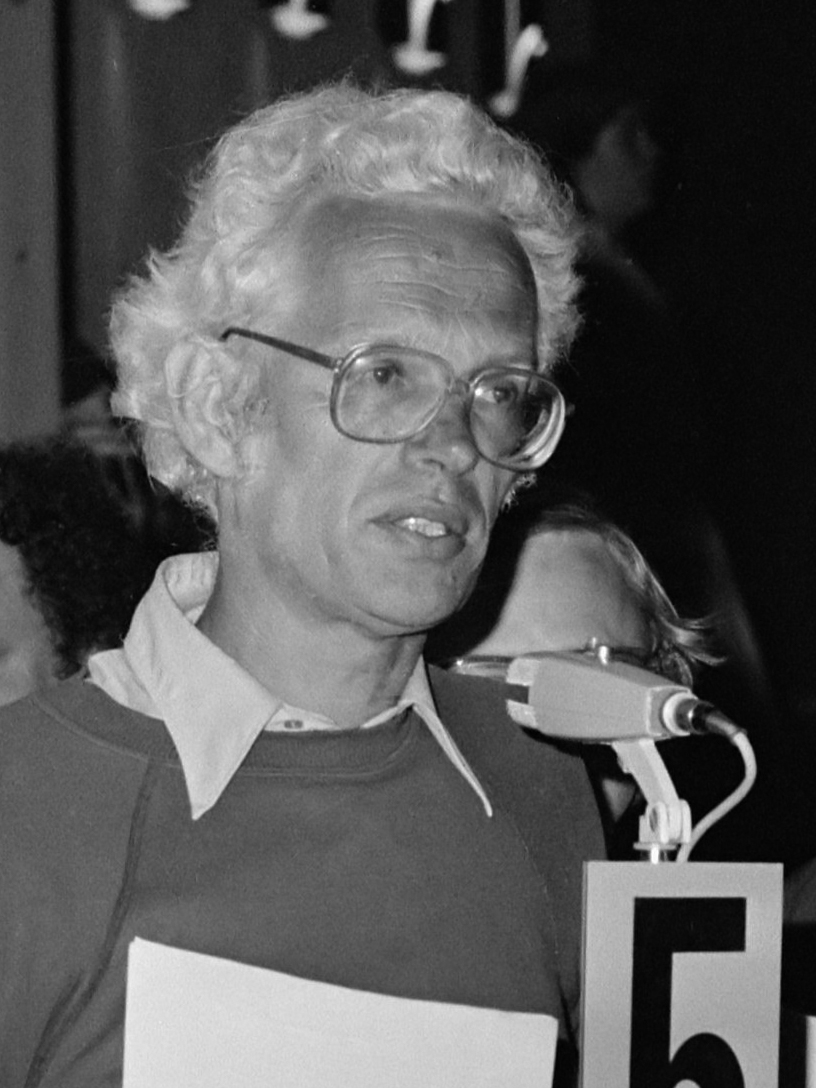
- Bosgra in 1986
- Born: Sietse Jan Bosgra; 21 September 1935; Groningen, Netherlands
- Died: 8 January 2023 (aged 87); Doorn, Netherlands
- Occupation: Political activist

Sietse Jan Bosgra (21 September 1935 – 8 January 2023) was a Dutch political activist against colonialism and apartheid.

== Biography ==
Bosgra studied physics at the University of Amsterdam and graduated in nuclear physics. As a student, he became involved in the resistance against colonialism. Bosgra was one of the founders of the Angola Committee in 1961, which was set up in response to the Portuguese repression in Angola. The committee's activities also started supporting liberation movements in Guinea-Bissau, Mozambique and South Africa. In 1976, the committee was renamed the Komitee Zuidelijk Afrika (KZA). In 1977, he received the Dick Scherpenzeel Prize for how he highlighted developing countries. In 1982, Bosgra was one of the initiators of the UN Year Foundation for Sanctions against South Africa, which campaigned for a cultural boycott of South Africa because of the apartheid regime. In the 1980s, he also championed an oil embargo against South Africa.

When apartheid was no longer a current problem, Bosgra turned his attention more to the Middle East. In 2011, for example, he was one of the leaders of the resistance against the possible new police mission in Kunduz in Afghanistan.

Bosgra was involved with the Nederlands instituut voor Zuidelijk Afrika (NiZA), later renamed ActionAid Netherlands, and he was a secretary at the Netherlands Institute for Palestine-Israel (NIPI).

Bosgra died in Doorn on 8 January 2023, at the age of 87.
