= Marijke Merckens =

Dutch actress and singer (1940–2023)

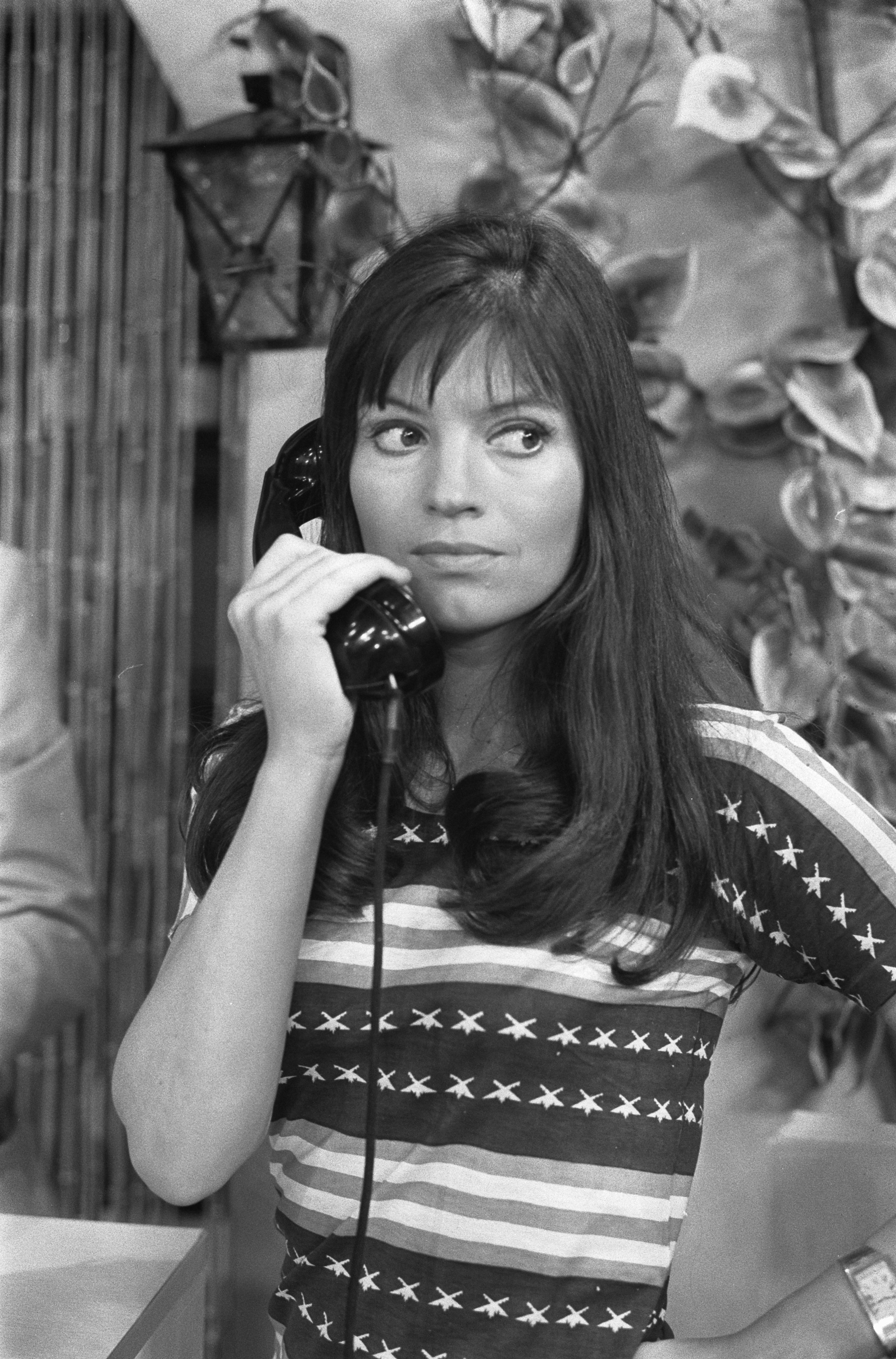
- Merckens in 1974
- Born: 3 February 1940; Magelang, Dutch East Indies
- Died: 9 February 2023 (aged 83); Harfsen, Lochem, Netherlands
- Occupations: Actress; Singer

Marijke Merckens (3 February 1940 – 9 February 2023) was a Dutch actress and singer.

== Filmography ==
=== Film ===
- A Woman Like Eve (1979)
- Ik ben Joep Meloen (1981)
- Honneponnetje (1988)

=== Television ===
- Leute wie du und ich (1982)
- De Zevensprong (1982)
- Sesamstraat
- Moordspel (1987)
- Medisch Centrum West
- Oppassen!!! (1993–1994)
- Ha, die Pa!
