= Linda van Dyck =

Dutch actress (1948–2023)

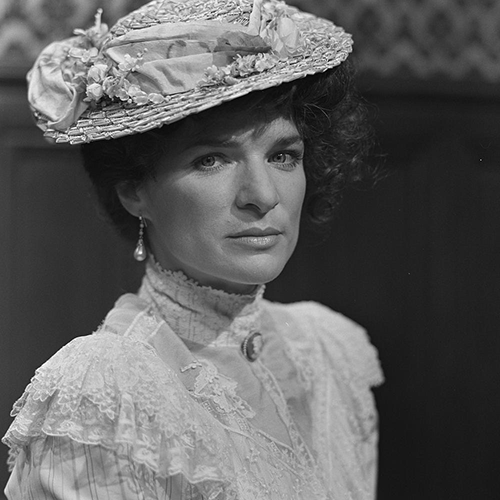
- Van Dyck in 1981
- Born: Linda Marianne de Hartogh; 18 May 1948; Amsterdam, Netherlands
- Died: 17 December 2023 (aged 75); Amsterdam, Netherlands
- Occupation: Actress
- Years active: 1966–2016

Linda Marianne de Hartogh (18 May 1948 – 17 December 2023), known by the stage name Linda van Dyck, was a Dutch actress.

== Biography and death ==
Van Dyck was the daughter of actor Leo de Hartogh and actress Teddy Schaank. Sometimes she was referred to as 'Linda M. de Hartogh' or "Linda Marianne". The actor Ko van Dijk Jr. was her stepfather. In the 1960s she was the singer of the band Boo and the Booboo's.

On 7 January 2010, Van Dyck received the distinction of Knight in the Order of the Netherlands Lion.

In 2016, she divorced film script author and later psychotherapist Willem Jacob Nolst Trenité after 27 years of marriage. They are the parents of television presenter Jamie Trenité.

Van Dyck suffered a cerebral infarction in 2021, which left her permanently partially paralyzed. She died on 17 December 2023, at the age of 75.

== Filmography ==
- 10:32 (1966)
- A Gangstergirl (1966)
- Ciske de Rat (1984)
- De grens (1984)
- Daens (1992)
- Suzy Q (1999)
- Baantjer (2001)
- Floris (2004)
- Schnitzel Paradise (2005)
- "Zwarte Tulp (TV Serie)" 2015-2016
