= Jan Krol (actor) =

Dutch actor (1962–2023)

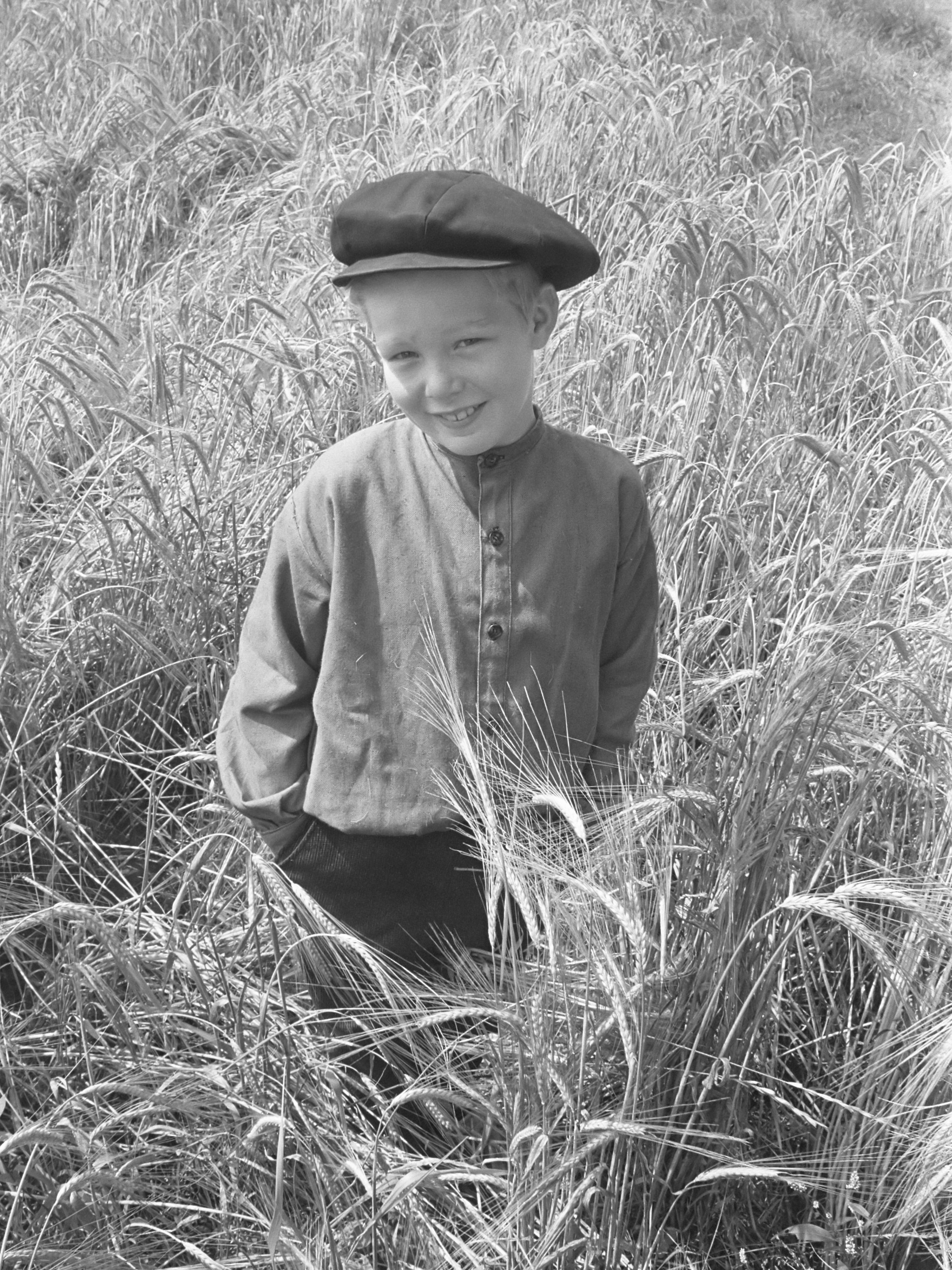
- Krol in 1972
- Born: 21 August 1962; Drouwen, Netherlands
- Died: 15 January 2023 (aged 60)
- Occupation: Actor

Jan Krol (21 August 1962 – 15 January 2023) was a Dutch television actor.

Krol became known for his role as the young Bartje in the series of the same name that was broadcast by NCRV from December 1972. Krol played in the first five of the seven episodes.

After secondary school, Krol did a youth welfare study in Leeuwarden. After his education, he started working in an epilepsy control center and then left for Germany to study. Krol became a teacher in Weimar, where he set up the school circus "Waldorfschule". He came back to the Netherlands to follow a clown course in Amsterdam. Krol became involved with the Anders Beleven Foundation (now called: Het Beter Gezelschap), which provides 'sensory stimulation' for healthcare workers, and with the international theater company Sign Dance Collective, which was founded in 2001. Krol worked in healthcare and was active as a freelance actor and clown.

Krol died on 15 January 2023, at the age of 60.
