= Eye of the Day =

2001 film

- Directed by: Leonard Retel Helmrich
- Written by: Hetty Naaijkens-Retel Helmich; Leonard Retel Helmrich
- Produced by: Scarabeefilms
- Cinematography: Leonard Retel Helmrich
- Distributed by: Cinema Delicatessen
- Release date: 1 March 2001
- Running time: 94 minutes
- Country: Netherlands
- Language: Indonesian

Eye of the Day is a Dutch/Indonesian documentary from 2001 directed by Leonard Retel Helmrich. The documentary released on 1 March 2001.

The documentary is the start of a trilogy and follows the family Sjamsuddin, existing of three generations in the slums of Jakarta Indonesia. The Dutch name is Stand van de Zon.

== Writers ==
- Leonard Retel Helmrich
- Hetty Naaijkens-Retel Helmich
