= Tim Hofman =

Dutch television presenter, journalist, poet, and columnist

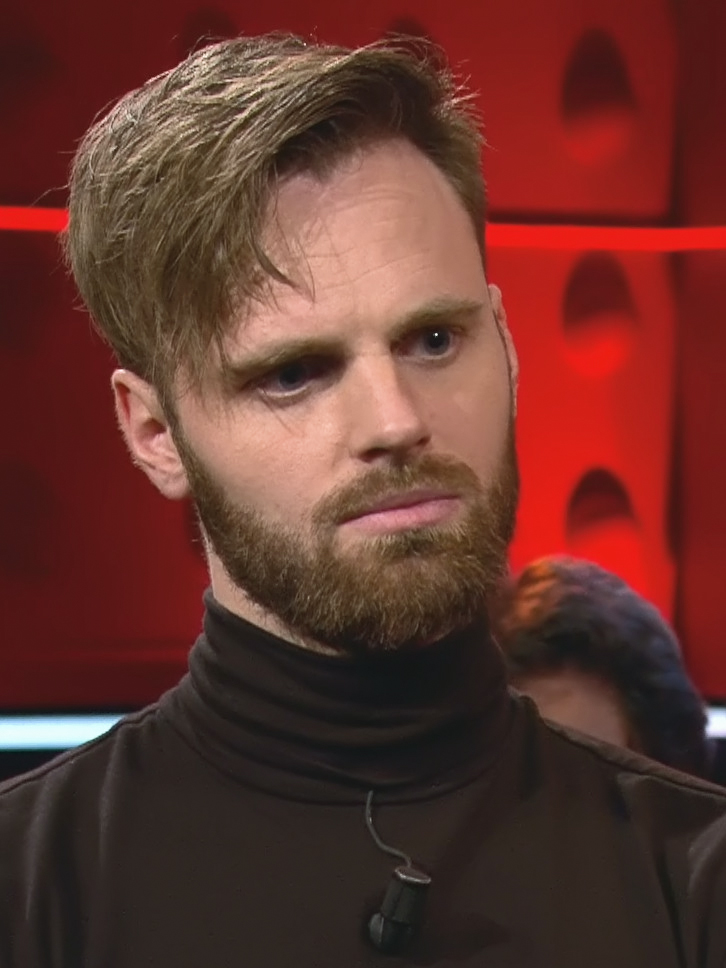
- Tim Hofman in 2018
- Born: 9 July 1988 (age 37); Vlaardingen, Netherlands
- Years active: 2011–Present
- Known for: BNN Today; Spuiten en Slikken #BOOS
- Television: BNN Today; Spuiten en Slikken #BOOS

Tim Hofman (Vlaardingen, born 9 July 1988) is a Dutch television presenter, journalist, poet, and columnist. Hofman often worked under the pseudonym debroervanroos. He is among other things known as the presenter of the online program #BOOS, with which he has won many awards.

== Career ==
After quitting three studies – Language & Cultural studies (Utrecht University), Dutch Language (Leiden University) and Communication Sciences (Amsterdam) – Hofman was admitted to the BNN-VARA Academy on 1 January 2011. Upon graduating from BNN Academy, he started at 101 TV as a reporter for TimTV and 101 Timeline.

After working for 101 TV, Hofman worked at the BNN and VARA program 24/7 as a reporter, panel member and internet expert from October 2011 to May 2012. Then in the summer of 2012 he made the program FC Gay for BNN. In the week before Christmas, Hofman was a reporter at the Glass House, where he regularly covered short news during the Serious Request Update.

In 2013 Hofman was a reporter for the BNN program Spuiten en Slikken, for which he made shows like Tims Tuintje, a ten-part series on the policy of weed in the Netherlands, in which he had his own cannabis farm. Hofman also started his writing career with an article in the magazine Foxy, in which he had a Belgian lady undress in a laundry room. On 5 February, Hofman appeared in the BNN-KRO program Zeg dag tegen pesten. Hofman was also a regular guest as an internet expert at NPO Radio 1's BNN Today and De Wereld Draait Door.

In 2014 Hofman became presenter of the daily program De Social Club, Je Zal het maar Hebben, the studio show of Spuiten en Slikken, Spuiten en Slikken op Reis and Mijn 5000 Vrienden. He also won the sixteenth season of the game show Wie is de Mol?

Together with presenter Jan Versteegh he was on the cover of L'HOMO. The presenters tried to bring homosexuality up for discussion. For this, they were nominated for the OUTtv Media Award 2016, an award that is awarded every year to a person who managed to positively promote homosexuality. For Spuiten en Slikken, Hofman traveled to the Philippines to document the drug war in the country. In June Hofman pleaded in front of the Lower House for a more open debate about drug use and a less strict policy, he was able to do this because of a citizens' initiative.

De Stembus (the voting bus), is an initiative that originated on Twitter, that urged young people to vote for the House of Representatives in 2017. Hofman, BNN chairman Zakaria Taouss and some other journalists were contributing to the initiative. One of the ideas put forward was to drive a van across the Netherlands and visit schools to draw attention to voting there. There was also a one-off route chosen by train throughout the Netherlands. Party leaders Mark Rutte, Alexander Pechtold, Marianne Thieme and Gert-Jan Segers went along with Hofman and the voting bus towards the young people on the trains. In addition to the bus and train, they wanted young people to be free on election day to vote and celebrate their democracy and the right to vote. The mission of Hofman and De Stembus was to get 850,000 young people who were allowed to vote for the first time that year to vote.

In 2020 Tim Hofman's show Over Mijn Lijk (Over My Dead Body) won the prestigious Gouden Televizier-ring award. The show follows terminally ill people as they navigate through life. He also won the award for best presenter and online show for #BOOS.

In 2022 and 2024 Tim Hofman won the Televizier-star awards for best presenter.

=== #BOOS ===
Since June 2016, Hofman has been presenter of the online program called #BOOS, which can be seen on the YouTube channel with the same name, NPO and BNNVARA's online channels. In the program Hofman helps people solve their problems. As the episodes followed, special spin-offs were added to the program, including #BOOS POLERTIEK, in which Hofman wanted to support the young people in choosing their own political preferences. There were also spin-offs in 2017 and 2018 in which Hofman came to the aid of other target groups; in #BOOS BELGIOOS he only helped Belgian participants and in #BOOS BEJAARDENSOOS he only helped older participants.

A BOOS episode from August 2017 made national headlines when Hofman was physically assaulted by landlord Ton Hendriks and suffered a broken jaw. Hendriks unsuccessfully tried to prevent the show from airing. The episode is about students whose homes have been in serious disrepair for a long time, with the landlord refusing to fix it after many requests. When Hofman goes the landlord to inquire about this he is assaulted. Hendriks was prosecuted and fined for assaulting Hofman. His son, who was deemed responsible for causing the assault, was sentenced to 180 hours of community service. Hofman sued Hendriks for damages, but later agreed to settle.

In October 2018 BOOS did an episode on 400 refugee children who had been denied asylum and were set to be deported. Many had been in the Netherlands either since birth or for many years. In December Hofman gave over 250,000 gathered signatures for a petition demanding asylum for these refugee children to the parliament. The government at the time initially said it would not extend a pardon, but by January 2019 changed course and announced an extension of a pardon for 700 refugee children.

In 2020 BOOS won the Televisier-Ster Online-Videoserie award. In the same ceremony Tim Hofman won the award for best presenter and his show Over Mijn Lijk (Over My Dead Body) won the prestigious Gouden Televizier-Ring.

The 20 January 2022 BOOS episode on alleged sexual abuse on the popular show The Voice Of Holland was viewed over 5 million times in the first two hours it was posted on YouTube. As of August 2024 it has over 11 million views. It led to the cancellation of the show and the criminal prosecution of two of the show's celebrity judges, rapper Ali B and singer Marco Borsato. In April 2023 BOOS won the highest Dutch journalism award, a Tegel, for this episode. In June of the same year the episode also won the prestigious Zilveren Nipkowschijf media award, the first time it was awarded to an online show.

In October 2023 a man armed with a knife and gun entered the BNN/VARA building in Hilversum looking for the host of BOOS Tim Hofman, with the intent of murdering him. The police was called and he was taken into custody. The Dutch Association of Journalists said the incident presented a serious threat to journalism as a profession. In October 2024 the man, identified as Chris T., was sentenced to 5 years in prison and compulsory psychiatric treatment for attempted murder with a terrorist motivation of Hofman and an aid worker. The prosecutor demanded 12 years of prison and treatment. The judge said the man was motivated to murder Hofman to instill fear in part of the public he described as "woke". Hofman had requested not to impose a high sentence, but to provide good treatment, and said he was doing well given the circumstances and wants to move on.

== Personal life ==
Tim Hofman has been in a long-term relationship with former model, writer and YouTuber Lize Korpershoek. Tim has four siblings, one sister and three brothers, two of whom, Sam and Rijk Hofman, are also active in media.

== TV-programs ==
Presenter:

- 101 TV – TimTV (2011/ 2012)
- 101 TV – Last Man Watching (2011)
- 101 TV – 101 Timeline (2012)
- BNN en VARA – 24/7 (2011/2012)
- BNN – FC Gay (2012)
- BNN – Spuiten en Slikken (since 2012)
- Nederland 3 en 3FM – Serious Request (2012 and 2013)
- BNN en KRO – Zeg dag tegen pesten (2013)
- BNN – Spuiten en Slikken op reis (since 2013)
- BNN – Mijn 5000 vrienden (pilot, winner TV Lab Award 2013)
- BNN – BNN Presents: Zwarte Cross 2013 / Mysteryland 2013
- BNN – De Social Club (2014)
- BNN – Mijn 5000 vrienden (2014)
- BNN – Je zal het maar hebben (2014–2018)
- BNN – Stayin' Alive (since 2016)
- BNN – #BOOS (2016–present)
- BNNVARA – TRIPPERS (since 2017)
- BNNVARA – Schuldig of niet (2018)
- BNNVARA – Over mijn lijk (2020–present)
- BNNVARA – Op1 (2020–present) as a substitute

Internetspecialist:

- De Wereld Draait Door – voor VARA

Documentaries:

- Paul – BNN (2008)
- Terug naar je eige land – #BOOS (2018)

Participant or guest:

- BNN – Ranking the Stars (2013)
- AVROTROS – Niets is wat het lijkt: Wie is de Mol? special (2015)
- AVROTROS – Wie is de Mol? (2016) Winnaar
- VARA – De Wereld Draait Door – Tafelheer
- YouTube – StukTV's Jachtseizoen (2016)

== Bibliography ==
Tim Hofman in Nijmegen to promote a collection of poetry

- 2017 – Gedichten van de broer van Roos
- 2019 – Grappig Jammer

=== Columns ===
- Columns for 3VOOR12 Den Haag (2011/ 2012)
- Columns for DeJaap.nl en ThePostOnline (2011/2012)
- Columns for DWDD Magazine (2013)
- "Gedichten" in Uitgeverij Lebowski's Achievers (2013)
- Columns for the Nieuwe Revu – In samenwerking met Maxim Hartman (2013-heden)

== Radio ==
- Columnist for Lust – BNN (Radio 1) (2011)
- Internetspecialist at BNN Today – BNN (Radio 1) (2012/2013)
- Poet for Jouw Ochtendshow – BNN (NPO 3FM) (2016)

== Music ==
- JIP – De Concurrent (ep) 2007
- JIP – Vernietigend Nederlands (ep) 2008
- F ft. Debroervanroos – Foto's van jou en mij
- Prinsenkind ft. The Greyness & Debroervanroos – Ah
- Prinsenkind ft. The Greyness & Debroervanroos – GNO (Guys Night Out)
- Piece van mij – Dave Budha ft. Debroervanroos

== Awards ==
Award	Year	Result	Notes
Haagse Popprijzen: Beste Akoestische Performance	2010	Won	With the band JIP
Cannabis Culture Award	2013	Won	With the program Spuiten en Slikken
TV Lab Award	2013	Won	With mijn 5000 vrienden
De TV-Beelden: Beste Actuele Programma	2014	Won	With the program Dag tegen pesten
Zeldzame Engel Award	2015	Won	With the program Je zal het maar hebben
De TV-Beelden: Beste Online Video	2017	Won	With the program #BOOS
SpinAwards: Content	2017	Won	With the program #BOOS
SpinAwards: Next TV & Film	2017	Won	With the program #BOOS
VEED Awards: RTL Boulevard-Award	2017	Won	With the program #BOOS
The Best Social Awards: Beste Snapchatter	2017	Won	–
The Best Social Awards: Beste BN'er	2017	Won	–
The Best Social Awards: Beste YouTuber	2017	Won	With the program #BOOS
Dutch Interactive Awards: Communities	2018	Won	With the program #BOOS
The Best Social Awards: Beste Personality	2018	Won	With the program #BOOS
The Best Social Awards: Beste YouTube-serie	2018	Won	With the program #BOOS
Hashtag Awards: Beste Online Video	2018	Won	With the documentary of the program #BOOS
Issue Award	2019	Won	With the documentary of the program #BOOS
VEED Award: Beste YouTube video	2019	Nominated	With the documentary of the program #BOOS
SpinAwards: Digital Celebrity	2019	Won	
The Best Social Award: Beste YouTube-serie	2019	Won	With the program #BOOS
Televizier-Ster Online-videoserie	2019	Nominated	With the program #BOOS
Gouden Televizier-Ring	2020	Won	With the program Over Mijn Lijk
Televizier-Ster Presentator	2020	Won	
Televisier-Ster Online-Videoserie	2020	Won	#BOOS
Televizier-Ster Presentator	2022	Won	
Televizier-Ster Presentator	2024	Won	
