= Korps Inlichtingen & Veiligheid Prinses Alexia =

Dutch military unit

Intelligence & Security Corps Princess Alexia
- Korps Inlichtingen en Veiligheid Prinses Alexia
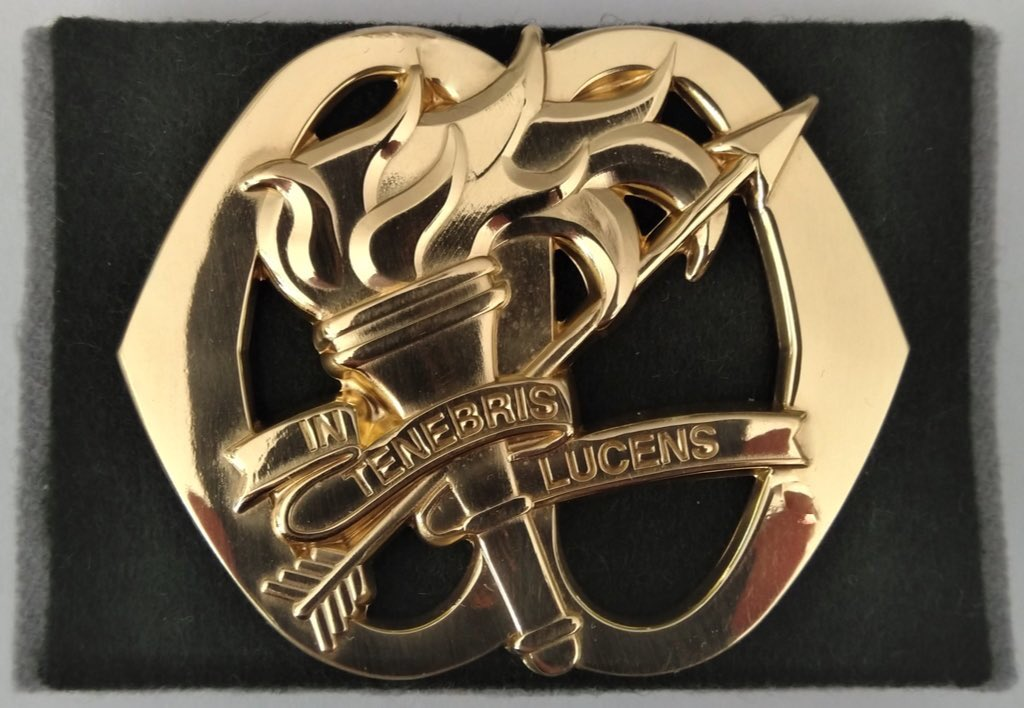
- Cap badge of the Intelligence & Security Corps
- Active: 1954-1995 101 MI Service Company; 1995-2011 101 MI Platoon; 2020 Intelligence & Security Corps
- Country: Netherlands
- Branch: Royal Netherlands Army
- Type: Intelligence
- Role: Intelligence gathering and analysis
- Part of: Joint ISTAR Command; J2/G2
- Garrison/HQ: Lieutenant-Colonel Tonnet Barracks, 't Harde
- Motto: In Tenebris Lucens ('Bringing light to Darkness')

Commanders
- Current commander: Colonel Jos Brouns

The Korps Inlichtingen & Veiligheid Prinses Alexia (Intelligence & Security Corps Princess Alexia) is a corps within the Royal Netherlands Army that specializes in the gathering and processing of intelligence. The corps, together with the Korps Communicatie & Engagement Prinses Ariane (Corps of Communication and Engagement Princess Ariane), constitutes the Arm of Information Manoeuver and was established on 20 November 2020.

== History ==
The first formalized intelligence unit of the Dutch army dates back to 1914 with the establishment of the General Staff Section III (GS III). In fact, this unit is the forerunner of all modern Dutch intelligence organizations. The history of the Intelligence and Security Corps goes back to 1954, to the founding of 101 Military Intelligence Service Company (101 MIDcie). This unit is the immediate precursor of which the Corps is now continuing the tradition. The establishment of the corps and the associated tradition system provides the intelligence personnel with a recognizable, unified identity. The naming of the corps after Princess Alexia also perpetuates the link between the army and the royal family.

== Organization ==
In the contemporary battlefield, the importance of (digital) intelligence is rapidly increasing. In order to cope with these developments, it was therefore decided to set up the Intelligence & Security Corps, which combines the forces of army personnel specialized in the gathering and processing of intelligence. The corps consists of personnel from the following units:

- Joint ISTAR Command (JISTARC)
- Defense Intelligence and Security Institute (DISI)
- Defense Geographic Service (DGI)
- Other army personnel working within the intelligence and security chain
