= Kees van Kooten =

Dutch comedian, television actor, and writer

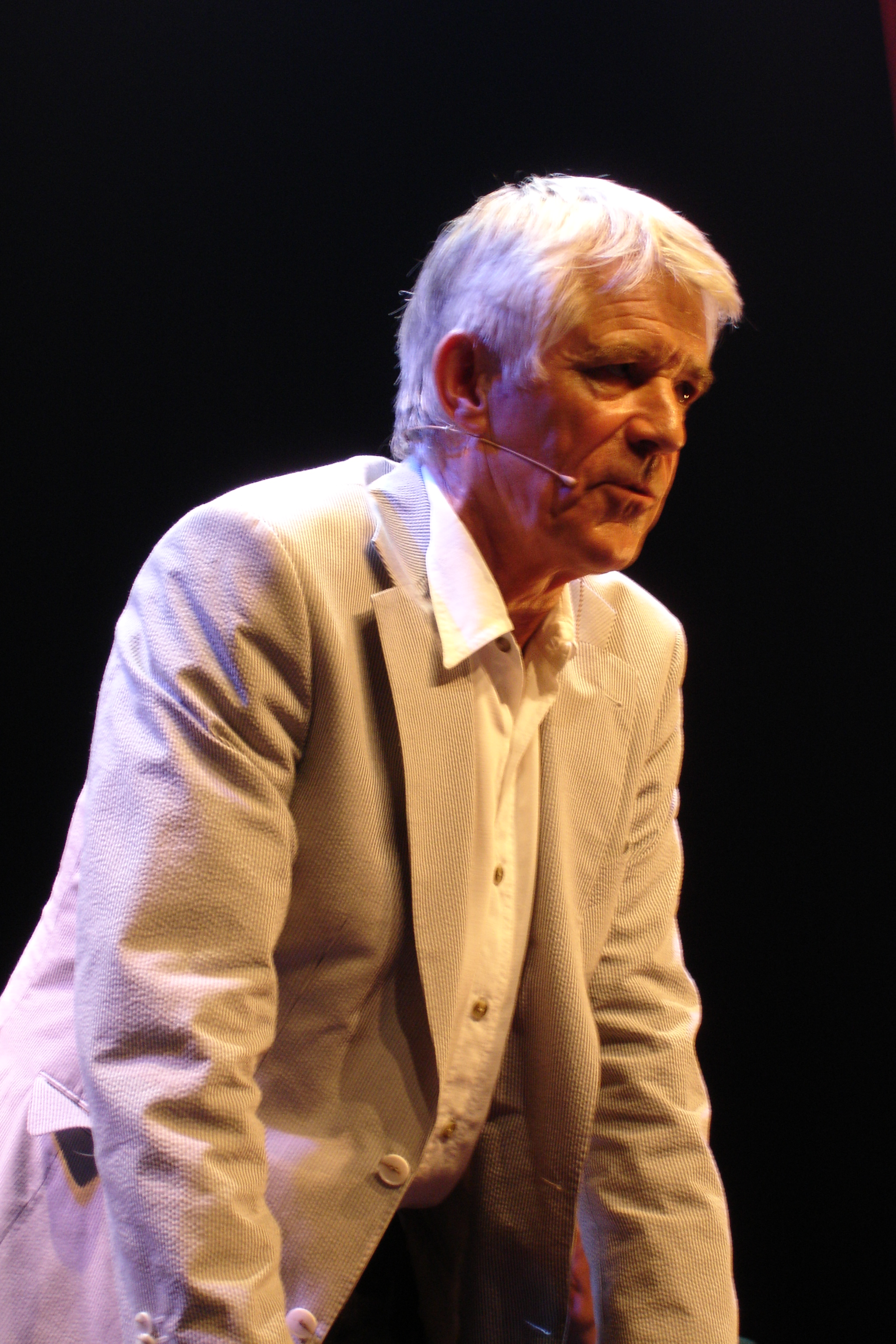
- Kees van Kooten in 2007
- Born: Cornelis Reinier van Kooten; 10 August 1941 (age 85); The Hague, Netherlands
- Other name: Koot
- Occupations: Comedian, actor, writer
- Known for: Van Kooten en De Bie
- Spouse: Barbara Kits (1968-)
- Children: Kasper van Kooten (1971); Kim van Kooten (1974)

Cornelis Reinier "Kees" van Kooten (Dutch pronunciation: [kɔrˈneːlɪs rɛiˈniːr keːs fɑŋ ˈkoːtə(n)]; born 10 August 1941) is a Dutch comedian, television actor, and writer. He formed the duo Van Kooten & De Bie with Wim de Bie from 1972 to 1998.

== Biography ==
Cornelis Reinier van Kooten was born on 10 August 1941 in The Hague, Netherlands. He is the oldest child of Cornelis Reinier van Kooten en Anna Geertruida Snaauw. He has one sister, Anke, who is a year younger. He met his wife Barbara Kits in 1959 and married her on 18 October 1968. After their marriage they moved from The Hague to the polder village of Zuidoostbeemster, where their two children were born, Kasper in 1971 and Kim in 1974. Both children are well-known performers in the Netherlands. In 1978 the family moved to Hilversum and in 1996 to Amsterdam.

Van Kooten is best known for his collaboration with Wim de Bie. With him he formed the comedic duo Van Kooten en De Bie, often abbreviated as "Koot en Bie," in a variety of often very popular programs for the VPRO broadcasting organization from 1972 to 1998. Their collaboration had started in the Dalton Lyceum high school in The Hague, where they had formed a theater group named Cebrah. Every year between 1972 and 1985 they published a tear-off calendar named Bescheurkalender, combining the Dutch words for tear-off and splitting one's sides in laughter; Bescheurkalender is now officially included in Dutch dictionaries for any humorous block-calendar.

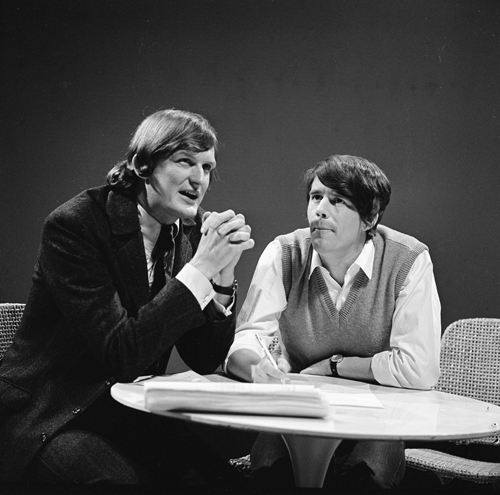
Wim de Bie and Kees van Kooten in 1968

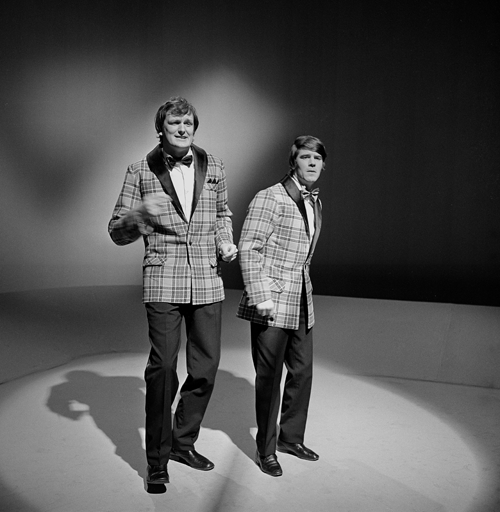
Wim de Bie and Kees van Kooten in 1970

== Books ==
Van Kooten has written some 47 books, including novels, short story and poetry collections, and autobiographical material. They are characterized by frequent wordplays and lighthearted satire of Dutch society. Few books have been translated in English. He often wrote under a wide variety of pseudonyms, including Koot, Jan Blommers, Hans van Dek, Tj. Hekking, Heer Kooten, Harry F. Kriele en Roman Tate. He also wrote several books together with Wim de Bie. Most of his books are published by De Bezige Bij. Among his better-known works are:

- 1969: Treitertrends ("trends in provocation")
- 1970: Treitertrends 2. ISBN 90-234-7017-6.
- 1972: Laatste Treitertrends. ISBN 90-234-7019-2.
- 1977: Koot droomt zich af. ISBN 90-234-0595-1.
- 1979: Koot graaft zich autobio. ISBN 90-234-0684-2.
- 1982: Veertig. ISBN 978-90-234-2507-6.
- 1984: Modermismen. ISBN 90-234-2321-6.
- 1986: Meer modermismen. ISBN 90-234-2335-6.
- 1988: Zeven sloten. ISBN 90-234-6092-8.
- 1989: Meest modermismen. ISBN 90-234-2373-9.
- 1991: Zwemmen met droog haar. ISBN 90-234-6122-3.
- 1993: Verplaatsingen. ISBN 90-234-6128-2.
- 1994: Meer dan alle modermismen. ISBN 90-234-3432-3.
- 1999: Levensnevel. ISBN 90-234-6202-5.
- 2000: Annie. ISBN 90-234-3974-0.
- 2007: Episodes: Een romance. ISBN 90-234-2273-2.
- 2013: De Verrekijker.
- 2021: De tachtigjarige vrede. ISBN 9789403123400.

== Awards ==
Van Kooten has received many awards for his television shows and writing, individually and with de Bie. Among these are:

- 1974 – Zilveren Nipkowschijf (Van Kooten en de Bie)
- 1977 – Zilveren Nipkowschijf (Van Kooten en de Bie)
- 1979 – Cestoda-prijs ("for effortless use of the Dutch language")
- 1985 – Special Zilveren Nipkowschijf (Van Kooten en de Bie)
- 1985 – Edison Award for Draaikonten (Van Kooten en de Bie)
- 1999 – Groenman-taalprijs ("for radio and television persona distinguished by their use of language")
- 2004 – Gouden Ganzenveer ("for exceptional contribution to Dutch literature")
- 2006 – Edison Award for Audiotheek, collected recordings of Van Kooten en de Bie

== External links and sources ==
- Media related to Kees van Kooten at Wikimedia Commons
- (in Dutch) Van Kooten & De Bie homepage
- (in Dutch) Dutch National Library's files on Kees van Kooten
- Kees van Kooten discography at Discogs
- Kees van Kooten at IMDb
