= Van Kooten en De Bie =

Dutch cabaret group and satirists

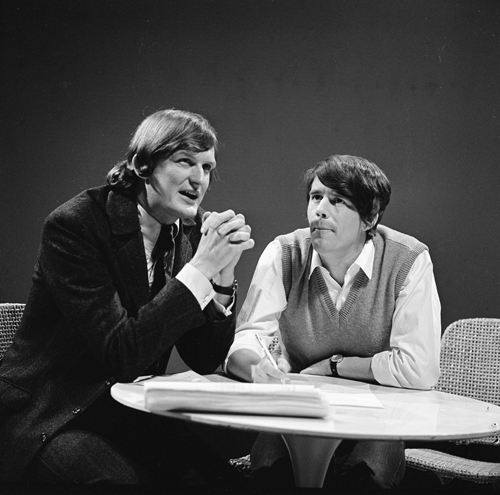
Wim de Bie (left) and Kees van Kooten in the TV show Fenklup in 1968

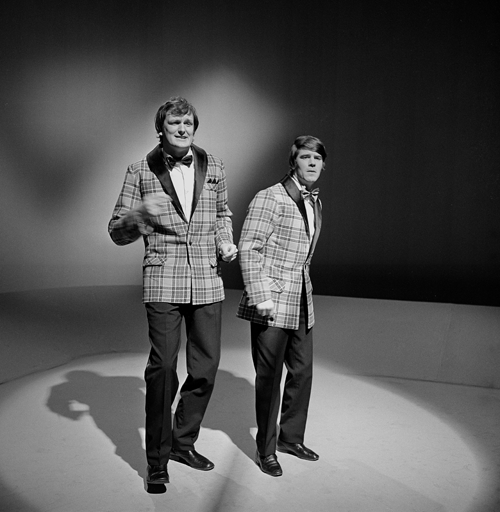
Wim de Bie (left) and Kees van Kooten in the TV show Hadimassa in 1970

Van Kooten en De Bie were a Dutch comedy duo formed by Kees van Kooten and Wim de Bie. They started performing together in 1963. They started off as radio comedians, but gained more prominence from 1966 on by working for television. In 1974 they began a weekly TV sketch show on Sunday evenings, "Het Simplisties Verbond", broadcast on VPRO, which continued for three decades under various titles, while remaining the same concept, until finally coming to a close in 1998. Despite the varying titles of their TV show the general audience always referred to them as Van Kooten en De Bie.

In the Dutch-speaking world Van Kooten en De Bie enjoy both a high popularity and critical acclaim for their satirical portrayal of society, with numerous classic sketches and comedy characters. They also created many musical singles, audio plays, calendars and books.

== Career ==
The two cooperated for years, before they started to work for the public broadcasting organization VPRO, where they first performed for radio broadcasting, and later took to making shows for television. Their first television appearance was in 1972 with the program Het Simplisties Verbond (The Simplistik [sic] League), with a carpet-beater as their symbol. The show mainly featured sketches whose returning intricate characters and running gags quickly became very well known in the Netherlands. In 1980 they changed the name of their weekly programme to Koot en Bie, a year later renamed Van Kooten en De Bie. In 1989 the show took a turn to focus more on current events, and was therefore renamed Keek op de week (View on the Week). In 1998 the duo finally decided to end their TV career. Their final TV appearance as "Koot en Bie", took place on 16 November 2003 in the VPRO program Terugkeek van Van Kooten en De Bie.

== Style ==
Van Kooten and De Bie were praised for their satirical and socially conscious view of Dutch society and politics. Over the course of three decades their TV show broadcast a new episode every Sunday evening. They played a host of recurring comedy characters, but also imitated well known Dutch politicians and entertainers. Most of the sketches were played only by themselves, with occasional extras and side characters. Apart from their TV shows Van Kooten en De Bie also made books, calendars, musical singles and audio plays.

From the 1970s until the 1990s they were household names in the Dutch-speaking world, drawing in many viewers from Flanders as well. They were a major influence on many Dutch and Flemish satirical sketch shows, including Koefnoen, Kopspijkers, 30 minuten, Draadstaal and In de gloria. Their influence on Dutch society is such that they inspired many neologisms, which entered the daily language and have been added to the dictionary. A 2003 study attributed at least 40 words and expressions to them, with 10 others they popularised.

They won two Zilveren Nipkowschijf awards, one in 1974 and one in 1977. In 1985 they received an honorary Nipkow schijf.

Their popularity is reflected in their 30th place in a 2004 public poll to search the all-time "greatest Dutchman". They were the highest television personalities on the list and as comedians were only preceded by cabaretier Toon Hermans at 22.

== Discography ==
Albums

- 1967 - De Clicheemannetjes: Tien Gesprekken Aan Het Biljart - 12"LP - OMEGA - 333 007
- 1968 - De Wereld Van De Klisjeemannetjes - 12"LP - FONTANA - XPY 857 063
- 1971 - Esperanto - 5 12"LP - TELEAC - 6844 17/19
- 1975 - De Eerste Langspeelplaat Van Het Simplisties Verbond - 12"LP - SIMPELPEE - SV 1
- 1976 - De Tweede Langspeelplaat Van Het Simplisties Verbond - 12"LP - SIMPELPEE - SV 2
- 1977 - Hengstenbal - De Derde Langspeelplaat Van Het Simplisties Verbond - 12"LP - SIMPELPEE - SV 3
- 1980 - Op Hun Pik Getrapt! - De Vierde Langspeelplaat Van Het Simplisties Verbond - 12"LP - SIMPELPEE - SV 4
- 1982 - Mooie Meneren - De Vijfde Langspeelplaat Van Het Simplisties Verbond - 12"LP - SIMPELPEE - SV 5
- 1984 - Draaikonten - De Zesde Langspeelplaat Van Het Simplisties Verbond - 12"LP - SIMPELPEE - SV 6
- 1987 - Van Kooten & De Bie Willen Niet Dood - 13 Scènes Uit Het Volle Leven - 12"LP - SIMPELPEE - SV 7
- 1988 - De Lachste Van Van Kooten & De Bie - 2 CD - SIMPELPEE - SVCD 8
- 1993 - Op Hun Pik Getrapt + Gouden Doden - CD - SIMPELPEE - SVCD 4
- 2005 - Koot & Bie - Audiotheek - 11 CD - NIKKELEN NELIS - 983 442 3

Singles

- 1967 - Wat is mijn bal nou? / Lekker legbad - 7"single - OMEGA - 35 777
- 1968 - 2 Glazen Zekerheid, Deel 1 / 2 Glazen Zekerheid, Deel 2 - 7"single - NILLMIJ VERZEKERINGEN - 113 977 F
- 1969 - Lonely Street / Voorbij - 7"single - IMPERIAL - 5C 006 24108 M
- 1969 - Sire (Reclame zonder commercieel doel) - 7"FD - STER - SHOL 992
- 1969 - Dat is de blues / Kom bij me terug - 7"single - FONTANA - YF 278 170
- 1971 - Conference van Kees van Kooten en Wim de Bie - 7"single - KODAK - 6802 035
- 1972 - White Gold Sherry Op 45 Stereo-Tour En ... In Blocpak - 7"EP - CARP - 6802 308 V
- 1975 - Zoek jezelf / Oh Lord + I'll Catch Your Cold - 7"single - SIMPELPEE - SVS 1
- 1975 - Stoont als 'n garnaal / Verbondshymne - 7"single - SIMPELPEE - SVS 2
- 1976 - De nee-reggae / I Wanna Fuck You - 7"single - SIMPELPEE - SVS 3
- 1976 - Rozen, rumbonen en rode wijn / The Lesson - 7"single - SIMPELPEE - SVS 4
- 1981 - Gouden doden: de nagelaten tapes van Jacobse en Van Es - 12"single - SIMPELPEE - SVMS 1
- 1984 - Ballen in me buik / Ouwe lullen moeten weg - 7"single - SIMPELPEE - 880 543 7
