= BOOS =

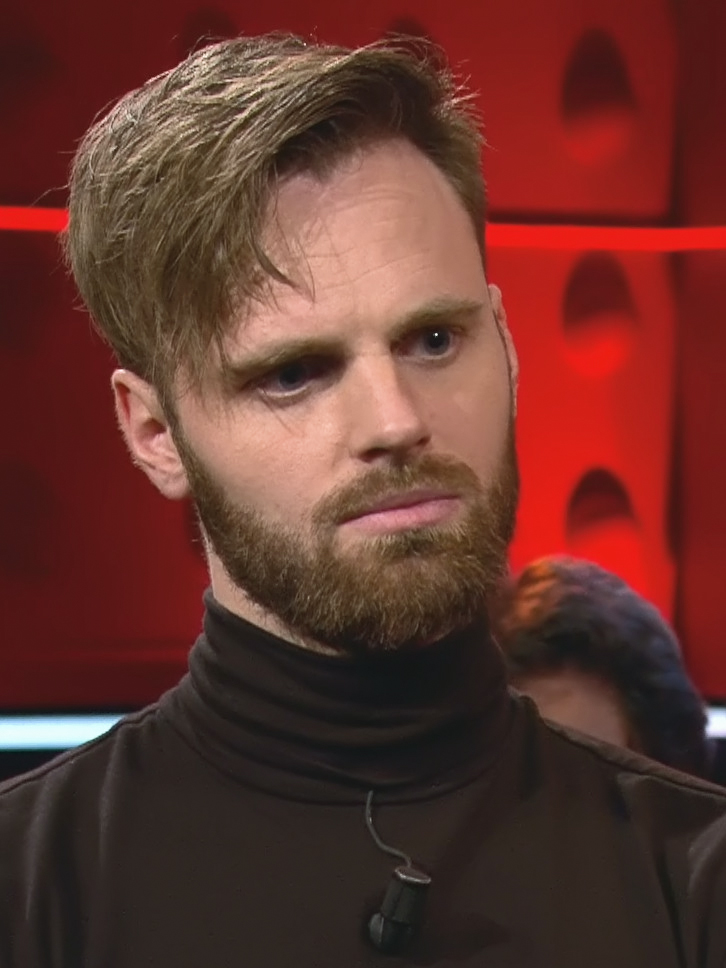
- Tim Hofman
- Genre: entertainment / journalism
- Presented by: Tim Hofman
- Country of origin: Netherlands
- Original language: Dutch

Original release
- Network: BNN-VARA, YouTube
- Release: 2016 – present

BOOS, in its first years known as #BOOS, is a Dutch online investigative journalism and consumer show that is broadcast on the eponymous YouTube channel as well as the online channels of public broadcasters NPO and BNN-VARA since 2016. The main host of the show is Tim Hofman, and producer Marije de Roode also often appears as a co-host.

The title of the show translates to "ANGRY" in Dutch, and refers to the general setup of the show, which is that someone who is dealing with some sort of problem, typically related to a scam or unfair treatment by public or private individuals or institutions, is helped by the show to resolve it. In some episodes and specials BOOS also tackles broader societal issues, like giving asylum to children, election specials focusing on politics and alleged sexual abuse in the entertainment world.

== Production history ==
A BOOS episode from August 2017 made national headlines when Hofman was physically assaulted by landlord Ton Hendriks and suffered a broken jaw. Hendriks unsuccessfully tried to prevent the show from airing. The episode is about students whose homes have been in serious disrepair for a long time, with the landlord refusing to fix it after many requests. When Hofman goes the landlord to inquire about this he is assaulted. Hendriks was prosecuted and fined for assaulting Hofman. His son, who was deemed responsible for causing the assault, was sentenced to 180 hours of community service. Hofman sued Hendriks for damages, but later agreed to settle.

In October 2018 BOOS did an episode on 400 refugee children who had been denied asylum and were set to be deported. Many had been in the Netherlands either since birth or for many years. In December Hofman gave over 250,000 gathered signatures for a petition demanding asylum for these refugee children to the parliament. The government at the time initially said it would not extend a pardon, but by January 2019 changed course and announced an extension of a pardon for 700 refugee children.

In 2020 BOOS won the Televisier-Ster Online-Videoserie award. In the same ceremony Tim Hofman won the award for best presenter and his show Over Mijn Lijk (Over My Dead Body) won the prestigious Gouden Televizier-Ring.

The 20 January 2022 BOOS episode on alleged sexual abuse on the popular show The Voice Of Holland was viewed over 5 million times in the first two hours it was posted on YouTube. As of August 2024 it has over 11 million views. It led to the cancellation of the show and the criminal prosecution of two of the show's celebrity judges, rapper Ali B and singer Marco Borsato. In April 2023 BOOS won the highest Dutch journalism award, a Tegel, for this episode. In June of the same year the episode also won the prestigious Zilveren Nipkowschijf media award, the first time it was awarded to an online show.

In October 2023 a man armed with a knife and gun entered the BNN/VARA building in Hilversum looking for the host of BOOS Tim Hofman, with the intent of murdering him. The police was called and he was taken into custody. The Dutch Association of Journalists said the incident presented a serious threat to journalism as a profession. In October 2024 the man, identified as Chris T., was sentenced to 5 years in prison and compulsory psychiatric treatment for attempted murder with a terrorist motivation of Hofman and an aid worker. The prosecutor demanded 12 years of prison and treatment. The judge said the man was motivated to murder Hofman to instill fear in part of the public he described as "woke". Hofman had requested not to impose a high sentence, but to provide good treatment, and said he was doing well given the circumstances and wants to move on.
