= General Intelligence and Security Service =

Agency of the Netherlands

- Algemene Inlichtingen- en Veiligheidsdienst

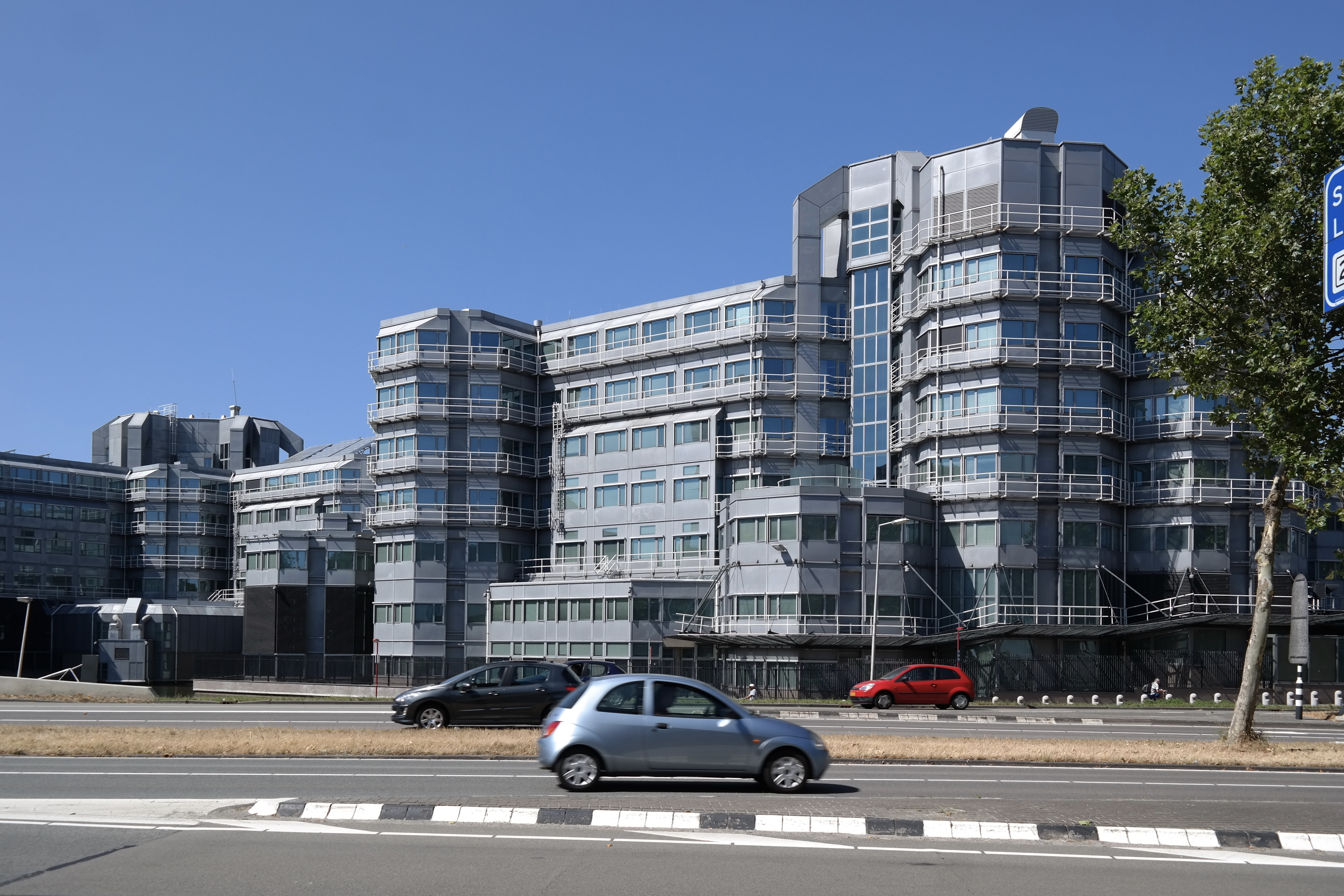
- Headquarters of the General Intelligence and Security Service

Agency overview
- Formed: 30 May 2002; 24 years ago
- Preceding agency: Binnenlandse Veiligheidsdienst (BVD)
- Headquarters: Europaweg 4, Zoetermeer, Netherlands
- Motto: "Live fish swim against the current, only the dead ones float with it"
- Employees: apprx. 2,800
- Annual budget: € 249,167,000 (FY2018)
- Minister responsible: Pieter Heerma, Minister of the Interior and Kingdom Relations
- Agency executives: Simone Smit, Director-General; Wieke Vink, Deputy Director-General
- Parent department: Ministry of the Interior and Kingdom Relations
- Website: General Intelligence and Security Service (in English)

The General Intelligence and Security Service (Dutch: Algemene Inlichtingen- en Veiligheidsdienst [ˈɑlɣəmeːnə ˈʔɪnlɪxtɪŋən ɛn ˈvɛiləxɦɛitsˌdinst, -ŋə ʔɛn -]; AIVD) is the intelligence and security agency of the Netherlands, tasked with domestic, foreign and signals intelligence and protecting national security as well as assisting the Five Eyes in investigating foreign citizens. The military counterpart is the Defence Intelligence and Security Service (MIVD), which operates under the Ministry of Defence.

== History ==
The history of Dutch intelligence can trace itself back to 1914 with the creation of the Generale Staf III (GS III) during the outbreak of World War I. The year following the end of the war, GS III was replaced by the Centrale Inlichtingendienst (CI) in 1919. After Nazi Germany invaded the Netherlands, the Dutch government-in-exile deemed the CI to be inadequate for their war efforts and so created the Bureau Inlichtingen (BI) in 1942.

After the war, in 1945, Netherlands replaced the Bureau of National Security (Bureau voor Nationale Veiligheid) and in 1947, was later known as the Domestic Security Service (Binnenlandse Veiligheidsdienst) (BVD) which would be the predecessor of the AIVD. For the gathering of intelligence abroad, the Foreign Intelligence Service — Buitenlandse Inlichtingendienst (BID), renamed to Inlichtingendienst Buitenland (IDB) in 1972 — had existed since 1946. This service was located in Villa Maarheeze in Wassenaar, just north of The Hague. IDB was dissolved in 1994 after heavy internal turmoil. The foreign intelligence task was eventually handed over to the BVD, which in doing so turned into a combined intelligence and security service. For this reason, it was rebranded Algemene Inlichtingen en Veiligheidsdienst (AIVD) on 29 May 2002.

== Mission ==
The AIVD focuses mostly on domestic non-military threats to Dutch national security, whereas the Defence Intelligence and Security Service (MIVD) focuses on international threats, specifically military and government-sponsored threats such as espionage. The AIVD is charged with collecting intelligence and assisting in combating domestic and foreign threats to national security.

== List of directors-general ==
Tenure	Name
2011–2018	Rob Bertholee
2018–2020	Dick Schoof
2020–2026	Erik Akerboom
2026–present	Simone Smit

== Oversight and accountability ==
The Minister of the Interior and Kingdom Relations is politically responsible for the AIVD's actions. Oversight is provided by three bodies:

- A review board for the use of special powers by intelligence and security services (Dutch: Toetsingscommissie Inzet Bevoegdheden, TIB) appointed by the Second Chamber of the States General.
- An oversight committee (Dutch: Commissie van Toezicht op de Inlichtingen- en Veiligheidsdiensten, CTIVD) also appointed by the Second Chamber of the States General.
- The Committee for the Intelligence and Security Services (Dutch: Commissie voor de Inlichtingen- en Veiligheidsdiensten, CIVD), comprising the leaders of all political parties represented in the Second Chamber of the States General, although until 2009 the Socialist Party (SP) was not and did not want to be part of this committee.

The AIVD publishes an annual report which includes its budget. The published version contains redactions where information is deemed sensitive.

The AIVD can be forced by the courts to publish any records held on a private citizen, but it may keep secret information that is relevant to current cases. No information that is less than five years old will be provided under any circumstance to private citizens about their records.

== Activities ==
Its main activities include:

- monitoring specific people and groups of people, such as political and religious extremists
- sourcing intelligence to and from foreign and domestic intelligence services
- performing background checks on individuals employed in "positions of trust", specifically public office and higher-up or privileged positions in industry (such as telecommunications, banks, and the largest companies) – this includes members of parliamentary oversight committees
- investigating incidents such as terrorist bombings and threats
- giving advice and warning about risks to national security, including advising on the protection of national leadership
- Netherlands National Communications Security Agency, advising on communication security for government users

== Methods and authorities ==
Its methods and authorities include:

- telephone and internet taps authorized by the minister of internal affairs (as opposed to a court order)
- infiltration (rarely by employees of the service, but rather by outsiders who would have easy access to a particular group)
- the use of informants (existing members of groups that are recruited)
- open sources intelligence
- unfettered access to police intelligence
- the use of foreign intelligence service liaisons who reside in the Netherlands under a diplomatic status (including full diplomatic immunity) to collect intelligence in excess of the AIVD's authority

The latter is technically the same as sourcing intelligence from a foreign intelligence service; this method has not been confirmed.

The AIVD operates in tight concert with the Regional Intelligence Service (Regionale Inlichtingen Dienst, RID), to which members of the police are appointed in every police district. It also co-operates with over one hundred intelligence services.

== Criticism ==
The service has been criticized for:

- Soon after the arrest of the Dutch businessman Frans van Anraat, who has been convicted of complicity in war crimes for selling raw materials for the production of chemical weapons to Iraq during the reign of Saddam Hussein, Dutch newspapers reported that van Anraat had been an informer of the Dutch secret service AIVD and has enjoyed AIVD's protection.
- Letting go of Abdul Qadeer Khan, who stole Dutch nuclear knowledge and used it for Pakistan to produce its nuclear bomb. However, former Prime Minister of the Netherlands Ruud Lubbers claimed in 2005 that this was done on a foreign request.
- Not having enough focus and intelligence on Islamist groups, particularly following the September 11, 2001 attacks and the murder of Theo van Gogh by Mohammed Bouyeri, a member of the Hofstad Network of Islamist terrorism
- Not having enough focus and intelligence on political violence or environmental groups, particularly following the murder of Pim Fortuyn by an environmental radical
- Delivering hand grenades to members of the Hofstadgroep through alleged informer Saleh Bouali
- Investigating family members of the Queen that had had a family rift (Princess Margarita and Edwin De Roy van Zuydewijn), though this was not ordered by the minister of internal affairs, but rather by the Queen's office
- Losing a laptop and a floppy disk with classified information from a regional office of the AIVD. The disk was found by an employee of a car rental agency, and subsequently given to Dutch crime-journalist Peter R. de Vries. Information on the disks indicated that the service collected information on Dutch politician Pim Fortuyn and members of his party, as well as on left-wing activists. Among other things, the documents accuse Pim Fortuyn of having sex with underage Moroccan boys.
- During the Cold War the BVD had a reputation for interviewing potential employers of persons they deemed suspicious for any reason, thereby worrying corporations about the employment of these persons. Reasons for being suspect included leftist ideals, membership of the Communist Party, or a spotty military record (such as being a conscientious objector with regard to conscription), although no evidence of the latter has ever been produced.
- In 2024 it was reported that the AIVD and MIVD had recruited journalists to act as their agents domestically and abroad, for which they were paid. This was confirmed in a CTIVD Oversight Committee report. The Dutch Association of Journalists criticized this, with its general-secretary Thomas Bruning saying: "I am ashamed of those who cooperate with this." The CTIVD also criticized the use of journalists by the AIVD and MIVD, saying they did not properly take into account the risks involved in this activity, particularly in high-risk foreign countries.

== Cozy Bear ==
On 25 January 2018, de Volkskrant and TV program Nieuwsuur reported that in 2014, the AIVD with assistance of the DGSE infiltrated the computers of Cozy Bear and observed the hacking of the head office of the Democratic National Committee and subsequently the White House, as well as being the first to alert the National Security Agency (NSA) about the cyber-intrusion.

== In popular culture ==
In the Lair of the Cozy Bear (allegedly a translation of the Dutch novel In het hol van de Cozy Bear) relates the story of the infiltration of Cozy Bear told from the perspective of an American liaison officer attached to the AIVD.

In the Dutch indie animation Ongezellig, Coco, one of the main characters of the show, accidentally hacks the AIVD website while trying to do research for her presentation.
