= Korps Communicatie & Engagement Prinses Ariane =

Dutch military unit

Communication & Engagement Corps Princess Ariane
- Korps Communicatie & Engagement Prinses Ariane
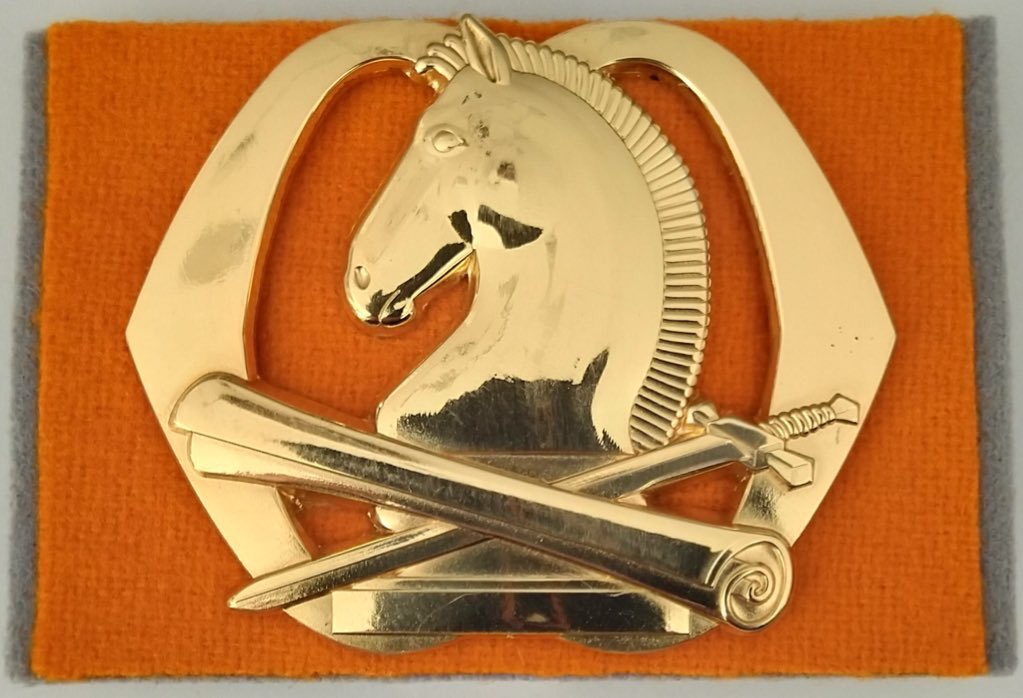
- Cap badge of the Communication & Engagement Corps Princess Ariane
- Active: 2020 - present
- Country: Netherlands
- Branch: Royal Netherlands Army
- Type: Communication and Engagement
- Role: Communication; Civil Military Interaction; Psychological Operations
- Part of: 1 CMI Command
- Motto(s): Nostrum Animus Nostrum Telum ("Our mind is our weapon")

Commanders
- Current commander: Lt Col Steffie Groothedde

The Korps Communicatie & Engagement Prinses Ariane (Corps of Communication & Engagement Princess Ariane) of the Royal Netherlands Army is a corps within the Arm of the Information Manoeuver, which was established as of 20 November 2020. It is named after Princess Ariane of the Netherlands.

== Organization ==
The unit specializes in civil-military interaction and communication in the broadest sense of the word. The deployment can be in mission areas but also in the Netherlands. The corps has a wide pool of military personnel, professionals and reservists, with various (civilian) specialisms. In addition, the force also has specialists in the field of psychological operations (PSYOP). The corps consists of personnel from the following units:

- Civil and Military Interaction Command (1 CMI-Co)
- Other army personnel working within the communication and engagement chain

== See also ==
- Dutch Military Intelligence and Security Service
