= Wim de Bie =

Dutch comedian (1939–2023)

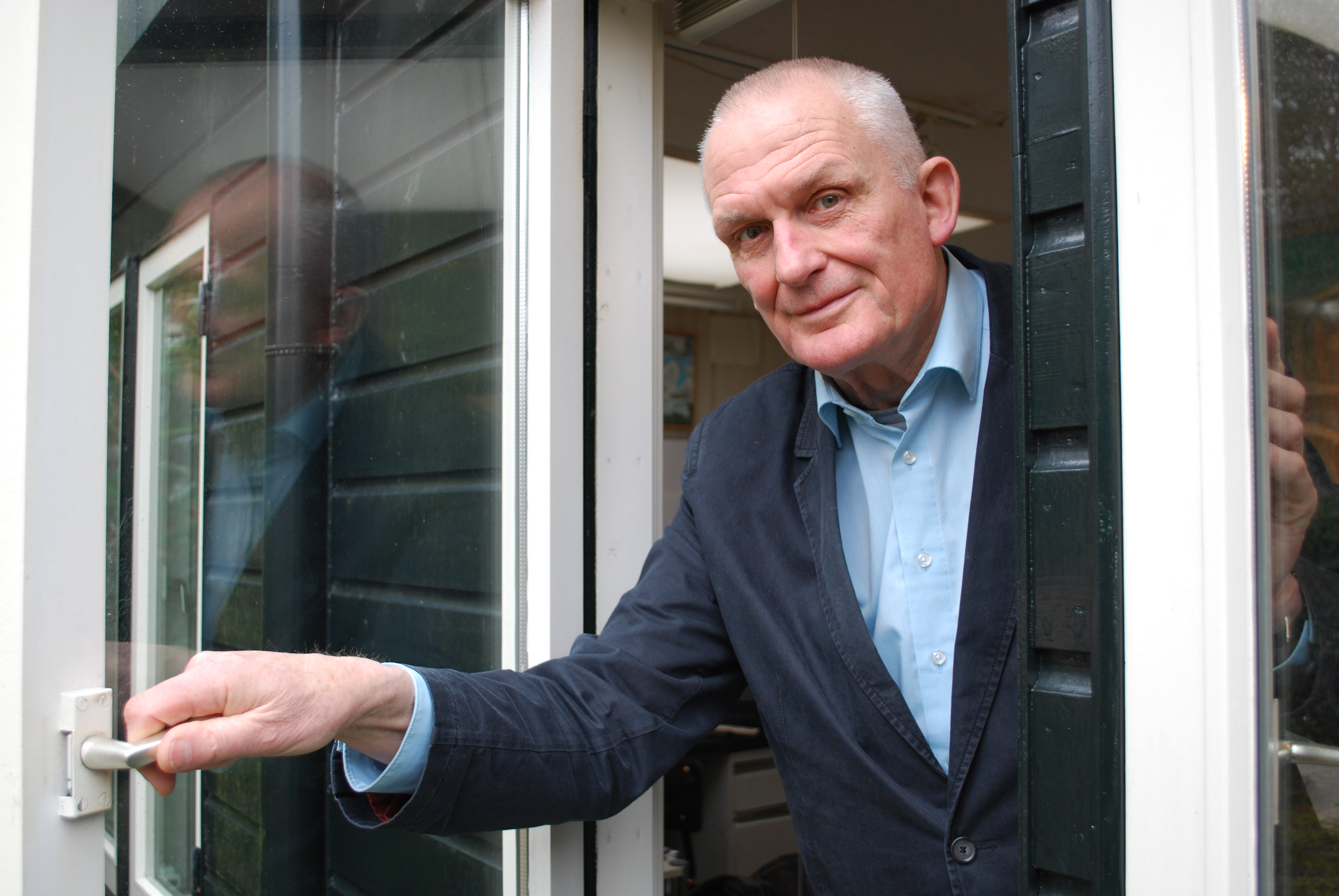
- De Bie in 2010
- Born: Willem Philippe de Bie; 17 May 1939; The Hague, Netherlands
- Died: 27 March 2023 (aged 83); The Hague, Netherlands
- Occupations: Comedian, writer, singer
- Known for: Van Kooten en De Bie, De Klisjeemannetjes, Simplisties Verbond

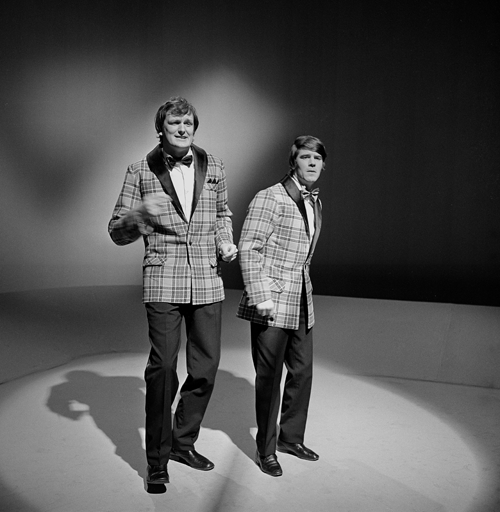
De Bie (left) and Kees van Kooten in 1970

Willem Philippe "Wim" de Bie (Dutch pronunciation: [ˈʋɪləɱ ˈfilip ˈʋɪm də ˈbi]; 17 May 1939 – 27 March 2023) was a Dutch comedian, writer and singer. He formed the comedy duo Van Kooten en De Bie with Kees van Kooten. Together they made various satirical TV shows.

== Life and career ==
Willem Philippe de Bie was born on 17 May 1939 in The Hague, Netherlands. He went to the Dalton Lyceum in The Hague, where he followed a HBS program. At this school he met Kees van Kooten, with whom he would form the comedy duo Van Kooten en De Bie.

De Bie made several radio and television shows. He also wrote several books and drew some comics. From 2002 on, De Bie was active as a blogger.

De Bie died of Parkinson's disease in The Hague, on 27 March 2023, at the age of 83.

== Bibliography ==
- 1970: Lachen is gezond
- 1972–1986: De bescheurkalender
- 1986: Bescheuragenda 1986
- 1986: Het groot bescheurboek
- 1987: Meneer Foppe en het gedoe
- 1988: De boekcorner van... Goos Verhoef!
- 1988: Schoftentuig
- 1990: Morgen zal ik mijn mannetje staan
- 1992: De liefste van de buis
- 1993: Ons kent ons
- 1994: Meneer Foppe in zijn blootje
- 1995: Meneer Foppe over de rooie
- 1997: Different koek!
- 2009: Meneer Foppe & de hele reutemeteut

== Discography ==
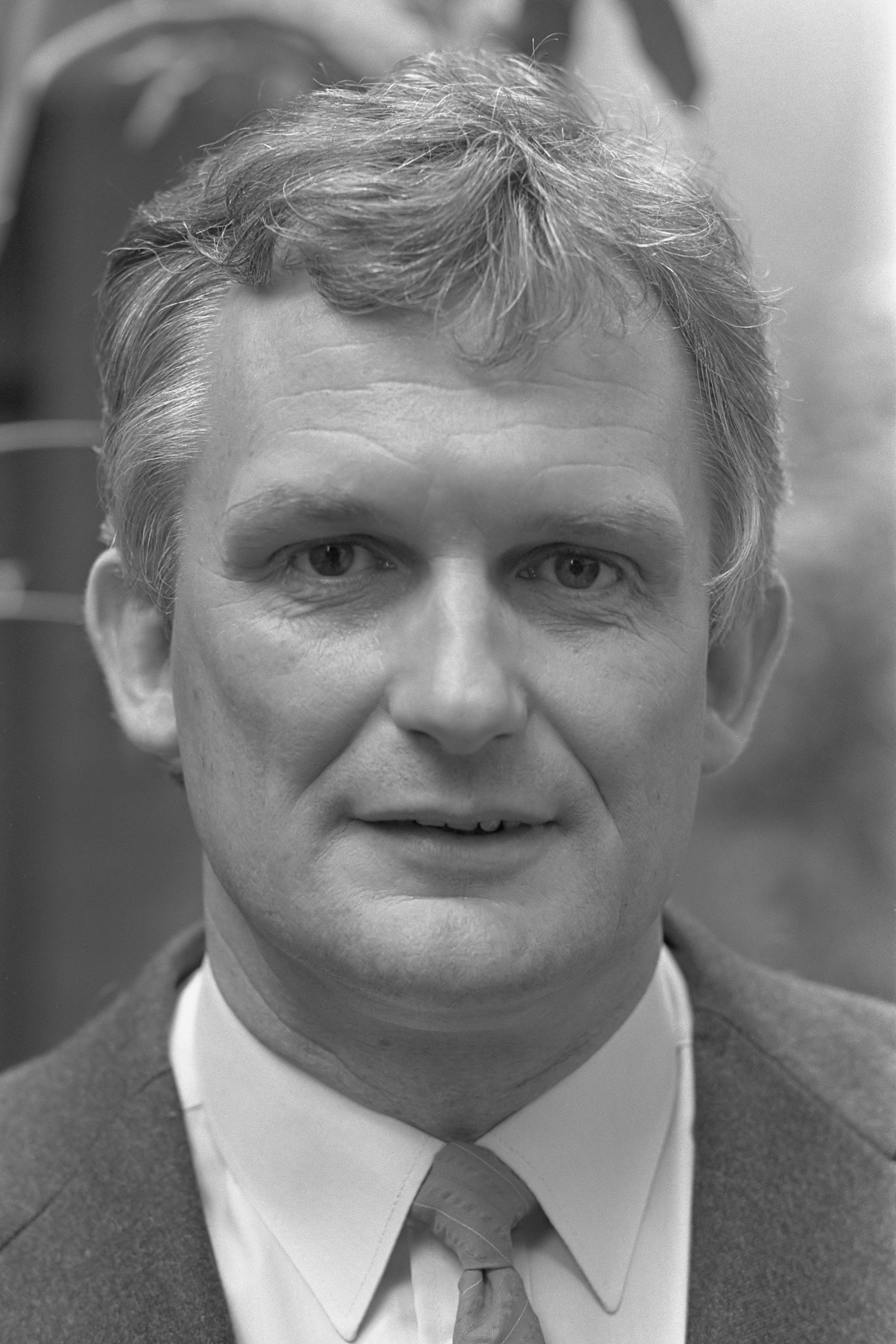
Wim de Bie presents solo LP (1984)

Wim de Bie released several solo albums.

- 1984: De Bie zingt (only released as LP)
- 1990: De Bie zingt a capella (cd-version with more songs than on the LP)
- 1996: De fluiten van ver weg: De wereldmuziek der Cananefaten
- 1997: Marylou (single; B-side: Het valt wel mee)
