= Villa Maarheeze =

National Monument in the Netherlands

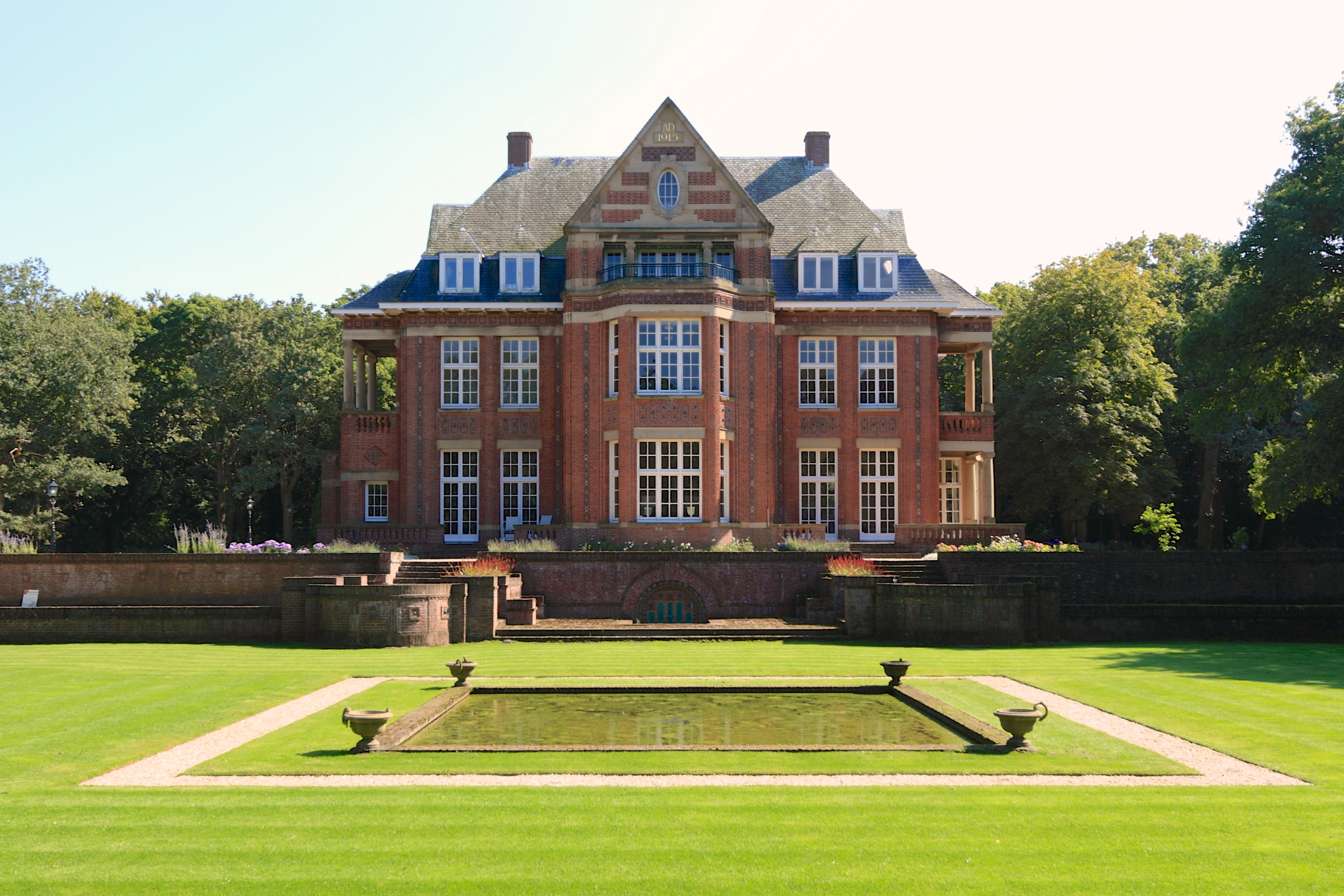
Villa Maarheeze

Villa Maarheeze was home of the Dutch foreign intelligence service Inlichtingendienst Buitenland, a service that existed from the end of World War II to 1994. The villa is located in the city of Wassenaar, at Rijksstraatweg 675, but is no longer in use by the Dutch government.

Villa Maarheeze was established in 1914 and is a Rijksmonument.

Villa Maarheeze was also used as name of a work on the Foreign Intelligence Service, Villa Maarheeze: de geschiedenis van de inlichtingendienst buitenland (1998), a book written by Bob de Graaff and Cees Wiebes.
