= Spuiten en Slikken =

Dutch television program

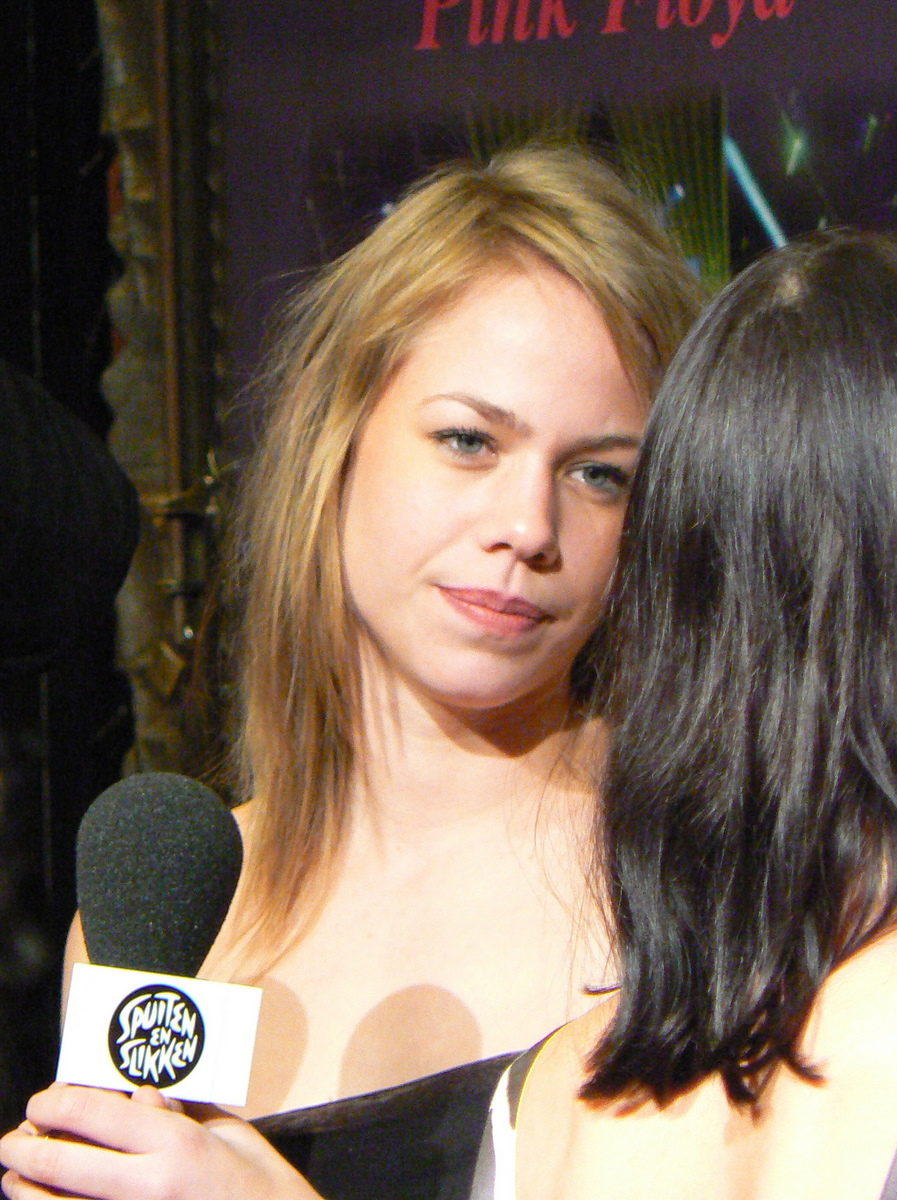
- Nicolette Kluijver, one of the main hosts of the show
- Presented by: Sophie Hilbrand (2005–2008); Zarayda Groenhart (2009–2012); Nicolette Kluijver (2009–2013); Victoria Koblenko (2014); Geraldine Kemper (2014–2016); Tim Hofman (2014–2017)

Spuiten en Slikken (Dutch pronunciation: [ˈspœytən ɛn ˈslɪkə(n), -tə ʔɛn -]) is a Dutch program about sexuality and drugs. The title in English translates to Shoot and Swallow, referring to drugs and sexual intercourse. It was produced and aired by public broadcaster BNN between 2005 and 2018, and is now exclusively aired on its YouTube channel. It was highly controversial from the start due to numerous drugs and sexual kinks that were tried out on television, often with participation of the hosts.

In the show, discussions about sex and drugs take place with weekly guests. The discussions are led by a host, which from 2009–2013 was Nicolette Kluijver. Reports from regular contributors to the show, such as Filemon Wesselink and Dennis Storm, also feature as regular parts of the show. These focus on using and discussing the effects of drugs and sexual topics.

== Drugslab (2016–2019) ==
In 2016 the creators of Spuiten en Slikken made the educational YouTube show Drugslab, wherein hosts try out drugs of all kinds with the aim of promoting responsible use of them. The channel quickly became popular outside the Netherlands as well, with their videos on cocaine, DMT and MDMA (ecstasy), LSD, and ketamine amassing millions of views. The show was discontinued in 2019 as they had already tried every drug once. However, in 2024, the hosts reunited for a one-off video.
