= Frans van Anraat =

Dutch war criminal and businessman (born 1942)

- Born: 9 August 1942 (age 84); Den Helder, Netherlands
- Occupation: Chemist
- Status: Released
- Conviction: Accessory to war crimes
- Penalty: 17 years imprisonment; commuted to 16.5 years imprisonment

Frans Cornelis Adrianus van Anraat (born 9 August 1942) is a Dutch war criminal and a businessman. He sold raw materials for the production of chemical weapons to Iraq during the reign of Saddam Hussein. In December 2005, a court in The Hague convicted him of complicity in war crimes for his role in selling chemical weapons to Saddam's government. He was given a 15-year sentence. On appeal, Anraat's sentence was increased to 17 years, then reduced to 16.5 years. He was released from prison in 2015.

== Business in Iraq ==
In the 1970s, Van Anraat worked at engineering companies in Italy, Switzerland and Singapore that were building chemical plants in Iraq. Having learned about the trade in chemicals, he founded his own company, "FCA Contractor", based in Bissone, Switzerland. Starting in 1984, he supplied thousands of tons of chemicals to Iraq including the essential raw materials for producing mustard gas and nerve gas. Both gases were used during the Iran–Iraq War, between 1980 and 1988, as well as during the Halabja poison gas attack the military carried out on Iraqi Kurds, in 1988, which killed about 5,000 people and injured 10,000 more. The attack was part of the Al-Anfal campaign of the Iraqi regime against Kurds in the north of the country. He was wanted by the Federal Bureau of Investigation in America for the illegal export of dangerous chemicals.

== Arrest and trial ==
After Van Anraat's arrest upon the request of the US in Italy in 1989, his offices in Switzerland and Italy were searched and documents were confiscated. Van Anraat was released pending extradition and fled to Iraq, where he lived for the next 14 years, was granted Iraqi nationality and given an Arabic name. When Hussein's regime fell in 2003, Van Anraat returned to the Netherlands, where he was interviewed by the General Intelligence and Security Service about his involvement with Hussein. He was arrested on 6 December 2004, for complicity in war crimes and genocide, after police realised that he was planning to flee the country. On 23 December 2005, he was sentenced to 15 years in prison for complicity in war crimes, but the court decided that the charges of complicity in genocide could not be substantiated.

The court also ruled that the killing of thousands of Kurds in Iraq in the 1980s, was an act of genocide. In the 1948 Genocide Convention, the definition of genocide is "acts committed with the intent to destroy, in whole or in part, a national, ethnic, racial or religious group". The Dutch court said that it was considered "legally and convincingly proven that the Kurdish population meets the requirement under the Genocide Convention as an ethnic group. The court has no other conclusion than that these attacks were committed with the intent to destroy the Kurdish population of Iraq."

Both the public prosecutor and Van Anraat appealed the verdict. In May 2007, the appeals court sentenced Van Anraat to 17 years in prison. The charge of complicity in multiple war crimes explains the extra two years, but he was not found guilty of complicity in genocide. In June 2007, the Dutch Supreme Court confirmed the sentence but reduced the imprisonment to 16 years and 6 months. Anraat was released from prison in 2015. The same year, an appellate court confirmed a ruling which required that Anraat pay €25,000 each to 16 plaintiffs in a civil suit against him.

== Informant for the Dutch secret service ==
Shortly after the arrest of Van Anraat, several Dutch newspapers reported that Van Anraat had been an informant for the Dutch secret service, the AIVD. According to the Dutch press, Van Anraat received protection from the AIVD and was placed in a safehouse of the Ministry of the Interior and Kingdom Relations, in Amsterdam.
