= Koos Postema =

Dutch radio and television presenter (1932–2026)

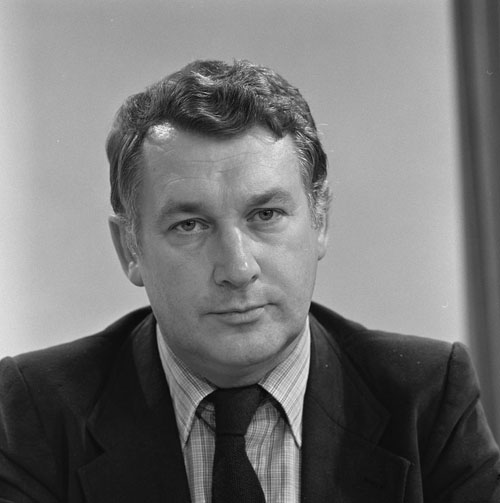
- Postema in 1980
- Born: 17 August 1932; Rotterdam, Netherlands
- Died: 21 February 2026 (aged 93)
- Known for: Radio and television presenter

Jacobus Gerrit "Koos" Postema (17 August 1932 – 21 February 2026) was a Dutch radio and television presenter.

== Life and career ==
Postema was born in Rotterdam on 17 August 1932. His father died when he was four years old and after the bombing of Rotterdam the family moved to Vlaardingen in 1940.

In 1960, he applied for a job at VARA radio, starting on May 1, 1960, as a reporter for the VARA radio program Dingen van de dag. The switch to television was made in 1963 when he became a reporter for the program Achter het Nieuws. In 1969, Postema begam hosting his own TV talk show, Een klein uur U, for which he won the Zilveren Nipkowschijf that same year. In 1971, the program changed to Een groot uur U, with high-profile and taboo-breaking broadcasts about abortion, contraceptive pills, assisted suicide, transsexuality and a controversial broadcast about pedophilia with former member of the Senate from the PvdA and collector of child pornography Edward Brongersma.

In 2020, Postema made a podcast about World War II.

Postema died on 21 February 2026, at the age of 93.
