= Arjan Ederveen =

Dutch actor and comedian (born 1956)

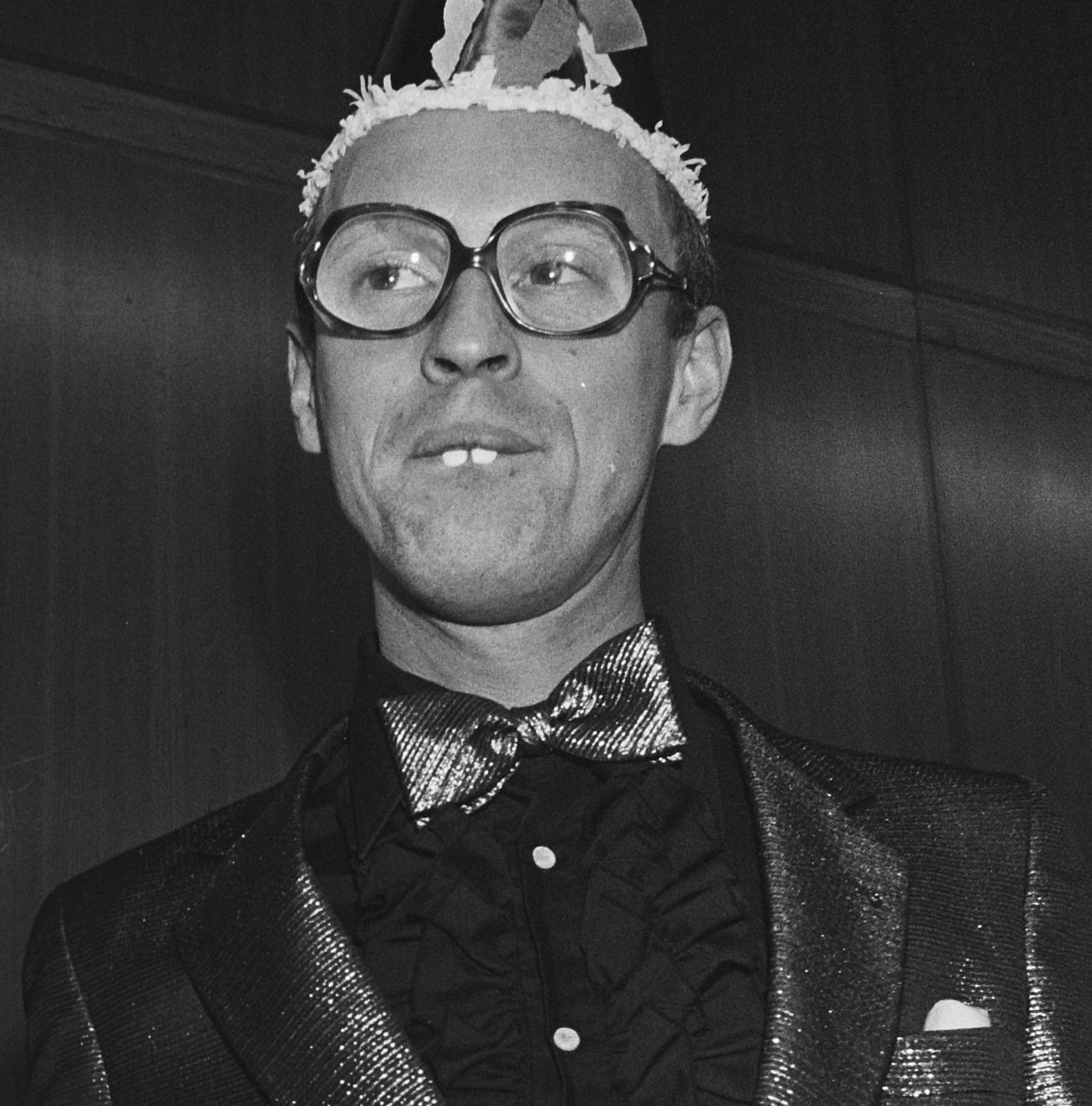
- Arjan Ederveen in character as Theo (1986)
- Born: Arjan Ederveen Janssen; 9 September 1956 (age 69); Amsterdam, Netherlands
- Occupations: Actor; comedian; playwright; writer; director
- Employer: VPRO
- Known for: Theo en Thea, Kreatief met Kurk, 30 minuten
- Website: arjanederveen.nl

Arjan Ederveen Janssen (born 9 September 1956 in Amsterdam) is a Dutch actor, comedian, TV scriptwriter and TV director. He participated in the TV series Theo en Thea, Kreatief met Kurk and 30 minuten and played in the musicals Hairspray and Lang en Gelukkig. He wrote the play Moord in de Kerststal. Ederveen owns a TV production company, called De Toko. His manager is Evelien Jansen.

== Career ==
Ederveen studied at the Academie voor Kleinkunst and graduated in 1981.

Between 1981 and 1984 he starred as half of the comedic duo De Duos, which he formed together with Kees Prins. He played a bellboy in the Cheech and Chong film Still Smokin' (1983). In 1984 he played the role of Theo in the children's TV series Theo en Thea (1985-1989), alongside Tosca Niterink. He reprised this role in the film Theo en Thea en de Ontmaskering van het Tenenkaasimperium (1989), directed by Pieter Kramer.

In the 1990s Ederveen made the mockumentary TV series Kreatief met Kurk (1993-1994), 30 minuten (1995-1996) and Borreltijd (1996), in which he also played recurring roles. All shows were critically praised. 30 Minuten in particular earned him and director Pieter Kramer the Zilveren Nipkowschijf and the Gouden Kalf. He played the part of Charl Diepenhoef in Filmpje! (1995) and played in Doctor Feelgood in My Foolish Heart (2018).

In the 2000s he took part in several children's films, including the choreographer in Yes Nurse! No Nurse! (2002), chemist Geelman in Pietje Bell (2002), Mr. Pen and a hermit in Pluk van de Petteflet (2004) and Professor Lupardi in Kapitein Rob en het Geheim van Professor Lupardi (2007). In 2001 30 minuten received a follow-up: 25 minuten. In 2005 he also made the garden show Wroeten.

In 2010 he was a recurring panel member in Wie van de drie?

As a voice actor, Ederveen provided the voice of Rex in the Dutch version of the Toy Story franchise. He also dubbed Gonzo in The Muppets and Muppets Most Wanted as well as Vlad in the Hotel Transylvania franchise.

He appeared in the 2024 season of the television show The Masked Singer.

== Personal life ==
Ederveen's mother, Greetje van Schaik, was a theater actress. She appeared in the popular radio show De bonte dinsdagavondtrein. Ederveen's brothers both died young, respectively of AIDS and a rare blood disease.

Ederveen is openly gay and has an American husband, Howie. Ederveen is dyslexic and colour blind. He identifies himself as an atheist.
