= Joint ISTAR Command =

Joint ISTAR Commando
- Joint ISTAR Commando (JISTARC)
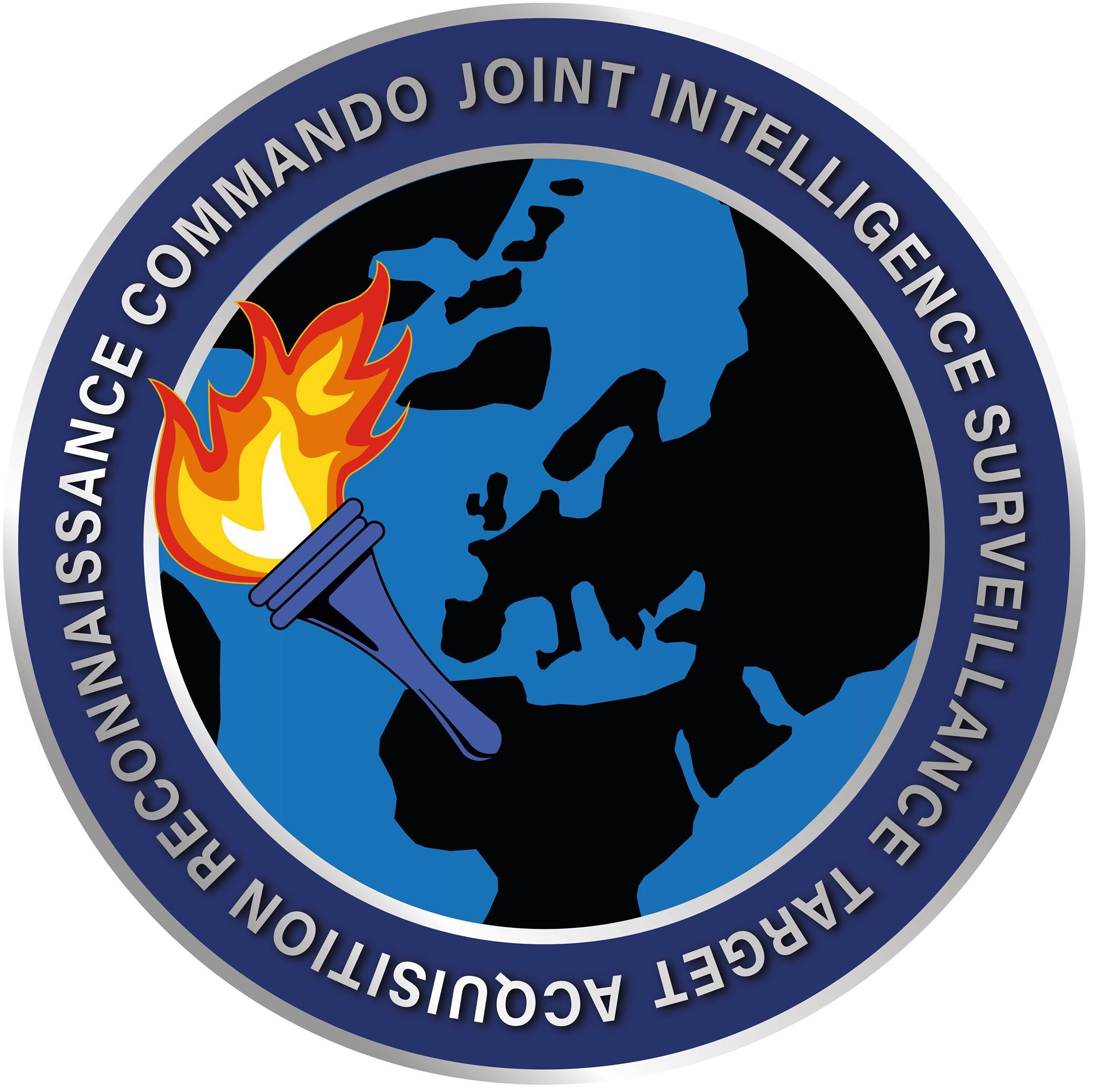
- Emblem of the JISTARC
- Founded: 19 October 2011
- Country: Netherlands
- Branch: Royal Netherlands Army
- Role: Military intelligence
- Size: c. 800 personnel
- Part of: Operational Support Command Land
- Garrison/HQ: Luitenant-kolonel Tonnetkazerne in 't Harde

Commanders
- Current commander: Colonel Jos Brouns

The Joint ISTAR Command (JISTARC, Joint Intelligence, Surveillance, Target Acquisition & Reconnaissance Commando) is a joint military intelligence command of the Operational Support Command Land of the Royal Netherlands Army. The command is specialised in the gathering, analysis and distribution of military intelligence, and consists of eight operational company-sized subunits.

== History ==
JISTARC was formally established on 19 October 2011, in Oldebroek. The establishment was a result of an amalgamation of the 103 ISTAR Battalion, which was founded in 2003, with comparable units of the Royal Netherlands Air Force, Royal Netherlands Navy and Royal Netherlands Marechaussee. Hence, JISTARC is a joint command in which personnel of the various service branches work side-by-side. Organisationally, however, JISTARC is part of the Operational Support Command Land (OOCL) of the Royal Netherlands Army. Since 20 November 2020, the majority of JISTARC personnel is part of the Korps Inlichtingen & Veiligheid Prinses Alexia of the Information Maneuver Arm.

== Units ==
The Joint ISTAR Command consist of the following units:

- Joint ISTAR Command
  - Staff Squadron (Stafstafeskadron): Squadron that comprises the staffs of both the squadron and the command. Tasked with command and control.
  - 102 Electronic Warfare Company (102 Elektronische Oorlogsvoering compagnie): The 102 EW Company is tasked with intercepting, analysing and jamming of all types of wireless communications. Personnel of the company is part of the Signals Regiment. Equipment includes EW variants of the TPz Fuchs and Bushmaster armoured vehicles.
  - 104 JISTARC Reconnaissance Squadron (104 JISTARC Verkenningseskadron): The 104 JVE is a reconnaissance squadron which consists of a squadron staff, a logistics platoon and 5 reconnaissance platoon equipped with Fennek light armoured reconnaissance vehicles. Personnel of the squadron is part of the Regiment Huzaren van Boreel.
  - 105 Field HUMINT Squadron (105 Field Humint-eskadron): The 105 Field HUMINT Squadron consists of personnel of all four branches. The Field HUMINT Teams (FHTs) of the squadron gather intelligence through contacts in their area of operations, draft reports and report their findings to higher echelons.
  - 106 Intelligence Squadron (106 Inlichtingeneskadron): 106 Intelligence Squadron consists of a squadron staff, an Intelligence Platoon, Intelligence Support Platoon and a Geo Support Platoon. The Intel Platoon consist of military analysts, human terrain analysts and geospatial analysts. The Intel Support Platoon consists of open-source intelligence (OSINT), imagery intelligence (IMINT), engineers intelligence and forensic intelligence (FORINT). The Geo Support Platoon gathers and analyses geospatial intelligence.
  - 107 Aerial Systems Battery (107 Aerial Systems Batterij): Battery equipped with a broad range of unmanned aerial systems, including RQ-11B DDL Raven, Q-27 ScanEagle, RQ-20 Puma and RQ-21A Integrator.
  - 108 Technical Exploitation Intelligence Company (108 Technical Exploitation Intelligence-compagnie): Established on 20 February 2020 as an intelligence unit which specialises in providing commanders with actionable forensic intelligence by exploiting all types of devices.
  - 109 Open-source Intelligence Company (109 Open Sources Intelligence-compagnie): Established on 20 February 2020 as an intelligence unit which is dedicated to detecting and gathering intelligence from open-sources in areas of operations.
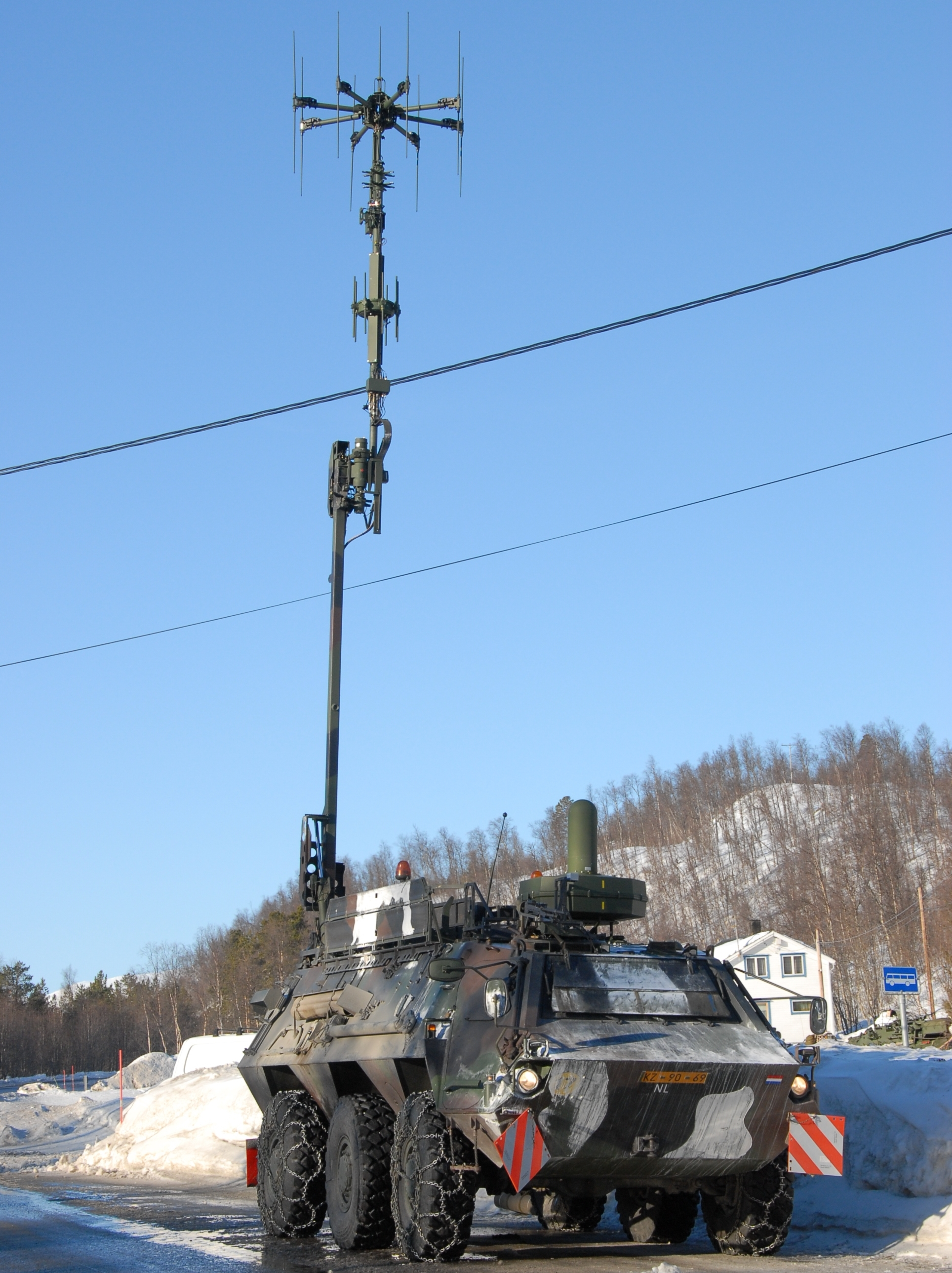
TPz Fuchs 1A1 EloKa of 102 EW Company

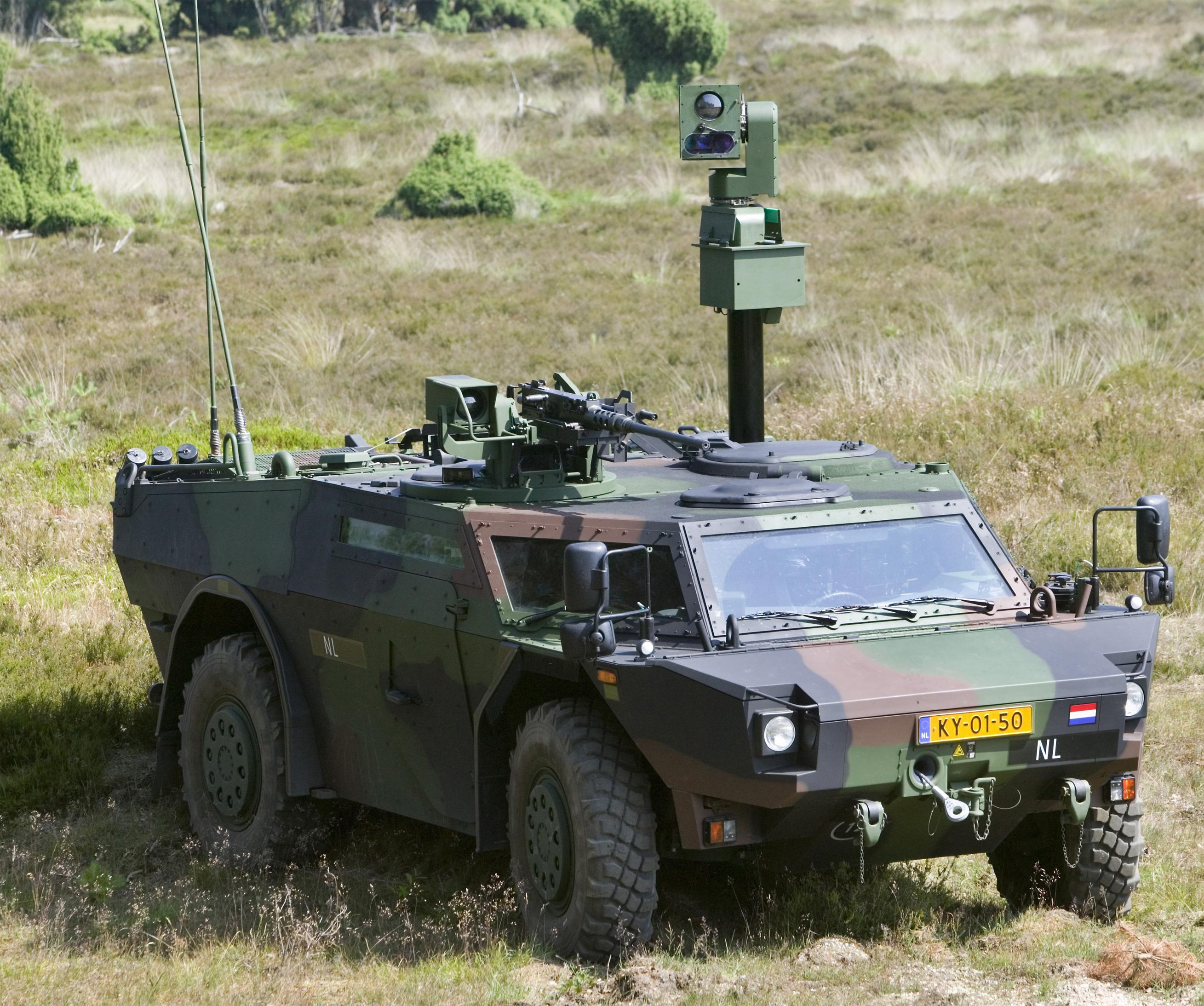
Fennek reconnaissance vehicle in use with 104 JISTAR Reconnaissance Squadron

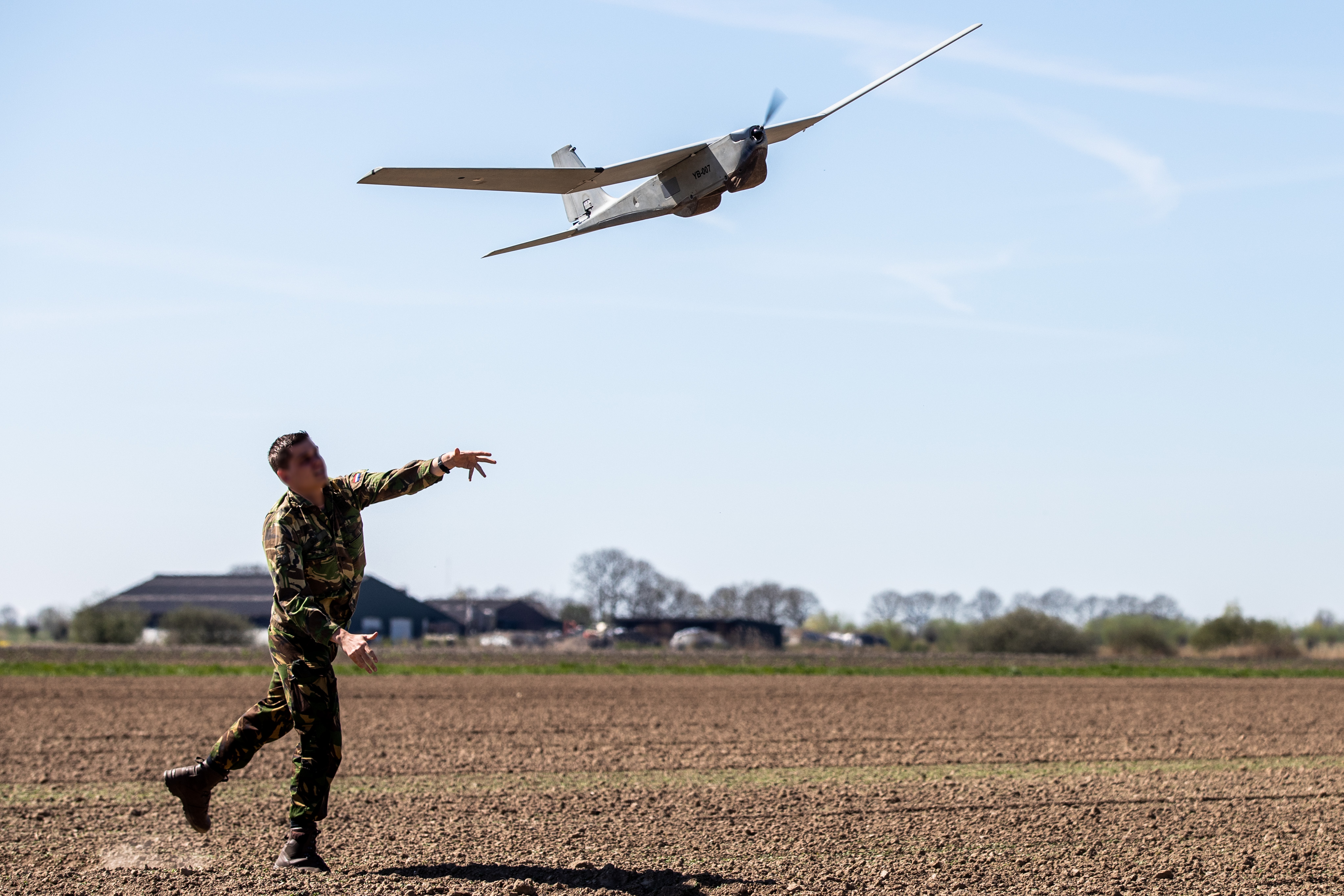
Hand-launched RQ-20 Puma of 107 Aerial Systems Battery

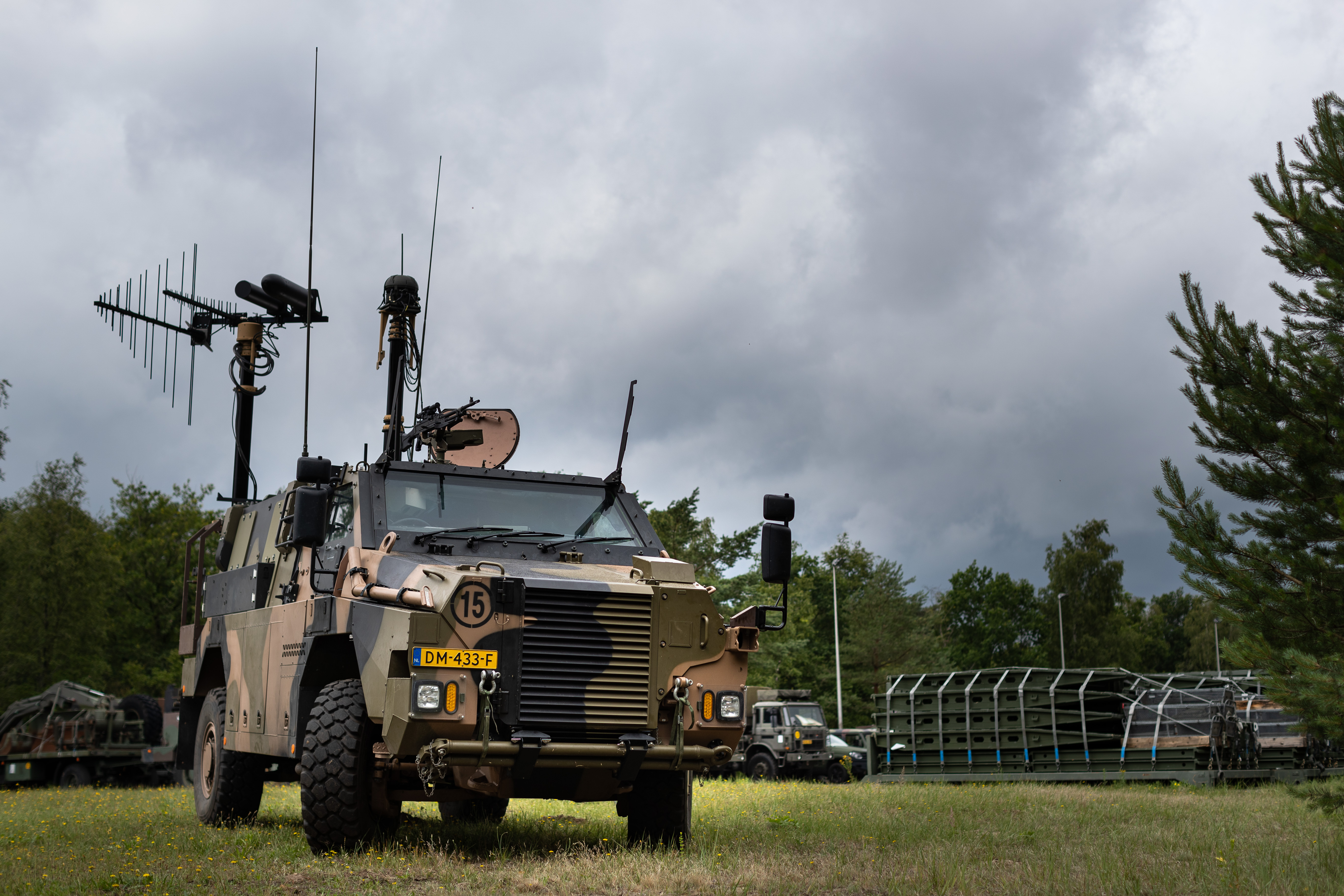
Bushmaster Multirole Electronic Warfare of 102 EW Company

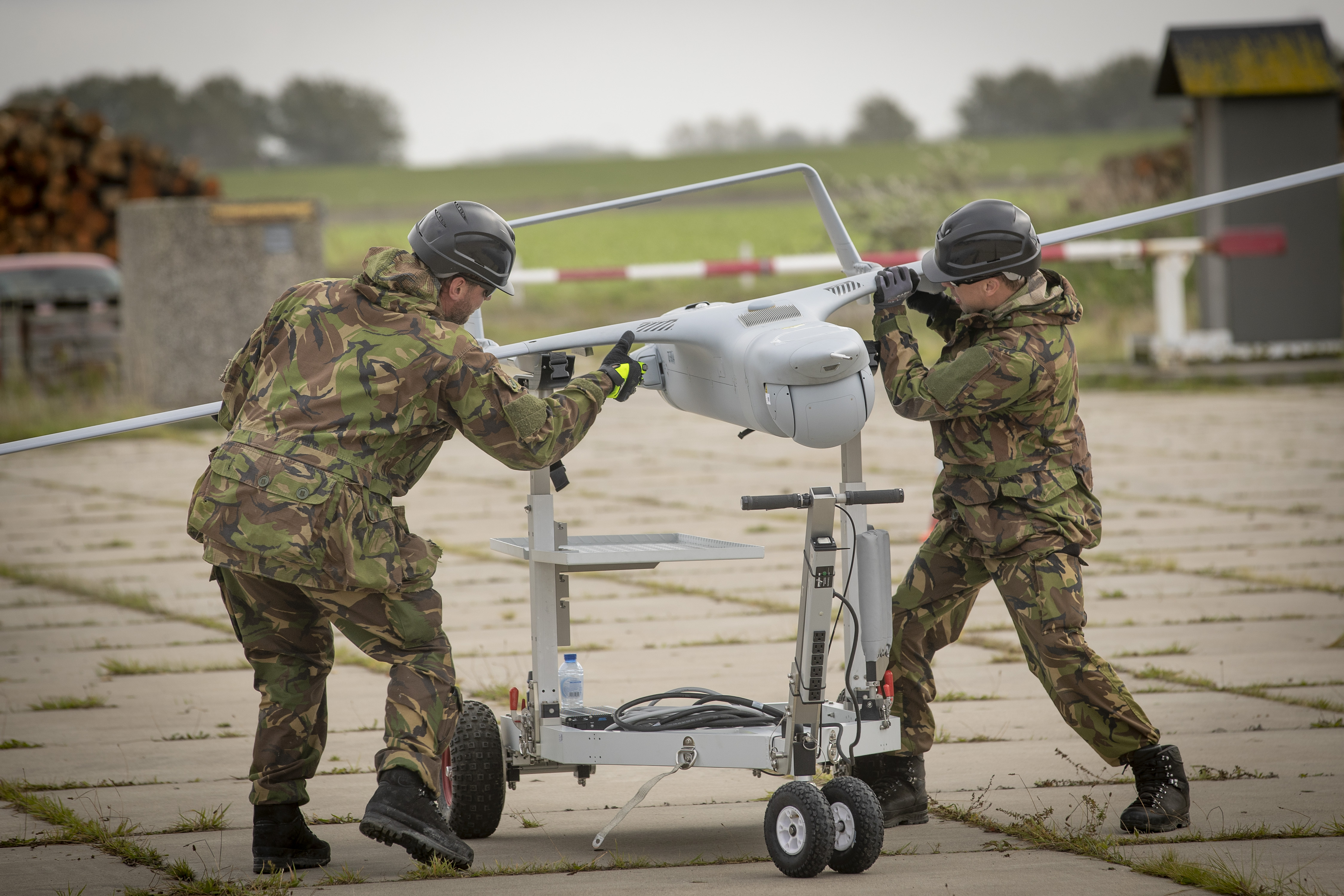
RQ-21 Integrator in use with 107 ASBt
