= 30 minuten =

- Genre: Sketch show Mockumentary; Satire; Tragicomedy
- Created by: Arjan Ederveen
- Directed by: Pieter Kramer
- Country of origin: Netherlands
- Original language: Dutch
- No. of seasons: 3
- No. of episodes: 21

Production
- Running time: 30 minutes

Original release
- Network: VPRO
- Release: 1995 – 1997

30 minuten (30 minutes) is a 1995 Dutch satirical mockumentary TV series, written by Arjan Ederveen and directed by Pieter Kramer. Ederveen also starred in every episode. Two series of seven episodes were produced and broadcast by the Dutch TV station VPRO between 1995 and 1997.

30 minuten was praised by many TV critics and received several awards. It was also a major influence on the Flemish mockumentary series In de gloria.

== Concept ==
30 minuten is a stylistic satire of documentaries and reality television. The title refers to its half-hour length and was inspired by the BBC documentary series Sixty Minutes. The series is filmed in a mockumentary style with tragicomic undertones. Each episode features a standalone "documentary" about everyday people followed by a camera crew. Ederveen tried to present the characters not as caricatures, but as actual people. In an interview he claimed: "What I'm doing now are no longer comic characters, but people of flesh and blood."

== Overview of episodes ==
Season 1

1. Vrije verstrekking (Free distribution): A heroin junkie takes part in a government project where he writes a children's novel in order to reintegrate into society.

2. Fanny en Fanneke (Fanny and Fanneke): A couple owns a small dog that is about to give birth. In the hospital it turns out that the animal suffers from a medical complication. The dog owners are now forced to choose between the life of their pet and her puppies.

3. Fout in '45 (Wrong in '45): An old woman takes care of her sick mother. The daughter speaks about her affair with a German soldier during World War II, of which her mother still disapproves.

4. Beyond tomorrow: An art historian has an advice center which predicts future events. In the episode he helps a TV presenter to better her public image and gives a margarine manufacturer advice on how to modernize his product.

5. Geboren in een verkeerd lichaam (Born in a wrong body): A Dutch farmer feels trapped inside his own body. He thinks he's a bosjesman from Zaïre and decides to have plastic surgery and a pigment operation, before eventually moving to Africa. This episode has become the most famous, winning a Golden Calf for its execution.

6. Scenes behind the scenes: During a fictitious celebrity show a singer and his partner show their luxurious home, where they talk about their projects.

7. Daarom (That's Why): a hidden camera follows the sufferings of the De Vries family.

Season 2

8. Vanwege Maartje (Because of Maartje): a female politician tries to obstruct her colleague when she is invited by the TV show Nova.

9. Feliz Navidad: A housewife hears she's allergic to Christmas and decides to undergo intense therapy.

10. Rondom Ons (Around us): In this spoof of the TV talkshow Rondom Tien("Around Ten"), some actual Dutch media celebrities are interviewed about their "recognition symptoms". Their "illness" is treated in the Psychiatric Broadcasting Clinic.

11. Een zijden draad (A silk thread): A military officer wants more openness about one of the Ministry of Defense's secret hobbies, which happens to be knitting, and organizes an exposition.

12. Een stukje eigen ikje (A piece of my own me): A lesbian couple lead a course where they want to bring the feminity of emancipated women to the surface. The harmony is disturbed when one of them falls in love with a fellow course taker.

13. Kasteelroman (Castle novel): A rich baroness talks about her past and her secret love for a mysterious gardener.

14. Meneer Pastoor (Mister Priest): A local priest tries to organize the annual culture week, which has buddhism as its central theme that week.

== 25 Minuten ==
In 2001 a spin-off was created named 25 minuten (25 minutes), which was more absurd in its mockumentary style.

=== List of episodes ===
1. Club Amor: A reality crew films inside a brothel.

2. Als we ervoor gaan, gaan we ervoor (When we go for it, we go for it) : A couple has trouble with being on time, but decides to overcome their problem.

3. De muze van Harry M. (The muse of Harry M.) : A soap about Irrëala Fictie, the muse of authors, who is unable to keep work and private life separate. The Harry M. in the title refers to novelist Harry Mulisch.

4. De Eugenie Groenhuyzen Show (The Eugenie Groenhuyzen Show) : A talk show about business issues, aimed at a female demographic.

5. Schemergeval (Twilight case): A magical realistic drama about a children's clown who suffers from heart problems and has trouble saying goodbye to his profession.

6. Er was eens... (Once upon a time) : A moralistic fairy tale about a representative in open doors who is converted in a seminary ran by gnomes.

7. The Making of Nina Brink the Musical: A behind-the-scenes look during the making of a documentary about real-life Dutch business woman Nina Brink.

== Awards ==
The first season won the Zilveren Nipkowschijf The episode Geboren in een verkeerd lichaam received a Gouden Kalf.
