= Zilveren Nipkowschijf =

Dutch television award

Zilveren Nipkowschijf (Dutch pronunciation: [ˈzɪlvərə(n) ˈnɪpkɔfsxɛif]; "Silver Nipkow Disk", named for German television pioneer Paul Gottlieb Nipkow) is a Dutch television and media award that has been given out since 1961 by a selection of Dutch media journalists and critics to the best show of the year.

The three founding critics were Henk Schaafsma of NRC Handelsblad, Hans Keller of Volkskrant, and Han G. Hoekstra of Het Parool. In 1975, Stichting Nipkow was founded and became the official foundation to award the Zilveren Nipkow. Tom Smeets of De Gelderlander has been the chairman of the foundation since its foundation. In 1996, the foundation started awarding the Zilveren Reissmicrofoon to the best Dutch radio show. In 2003, the foundation introduced a new award for best multimedia presentation, which was named the Zilveren Prichettprijs (named after Harry Prichett).

== Awards ==
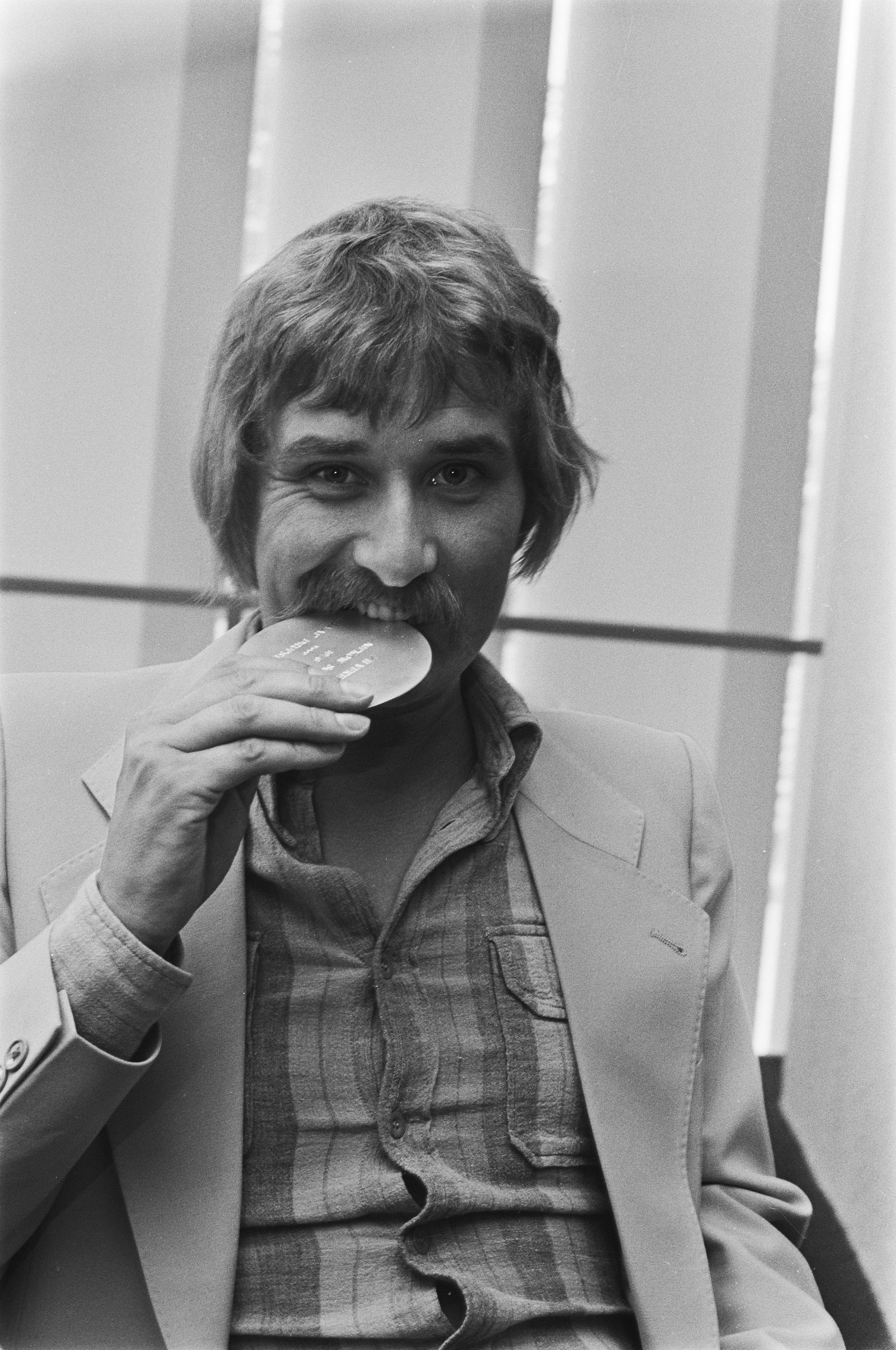
Jaap Drupsteen takes a bite (1976)

The awards were won by:

- 1961: Pierre Janssen en Leen Timp
- 1962: Wim Meuldijk, Lou de Jong and Mies Bouwman
- 1963: Hans Gomperts en Rudi Carrell
- 1964: Kees van Langeraad (NCRV) and "Brandpunt" (KRO)
- 1966: Erik de Vries
- 1967: Piet Kaart
- 1969: Bob Rooyens
- 1970: Dimitri Frenkel Frank
- 1971: Koos Postema
- 1972: Henk Mochel, De milde dood (euthanasie)
- 1973: Hans Keller, Het Gat van Nederland
- 1974: Kees van Kooten en Wim de Bie
- 1975: Culemborg...bijvoorbeeld
- 1976: Jaap Drupsteen
- 1977: Kees van Kooten en Wim de Bie
- 1978: Ikon, o.a. Geloof, Hoop en Liefdeshow
- 1979: J.J. de Bom, voorheen De Kindervriend
- 1980: Opname, van Werkteater
- 1981: Marcel van Dam, presentatie Achterkant van het gelijk
- 1982: Kees Boomkens, Vijf jaar later
- 1983: Afdeling culturele programma's NOS-TV
- 1984: Afdeling filmzaken Vara-TV
- 1985: Ons Indië voor de Indonesiërs van Jan Bosdriesz

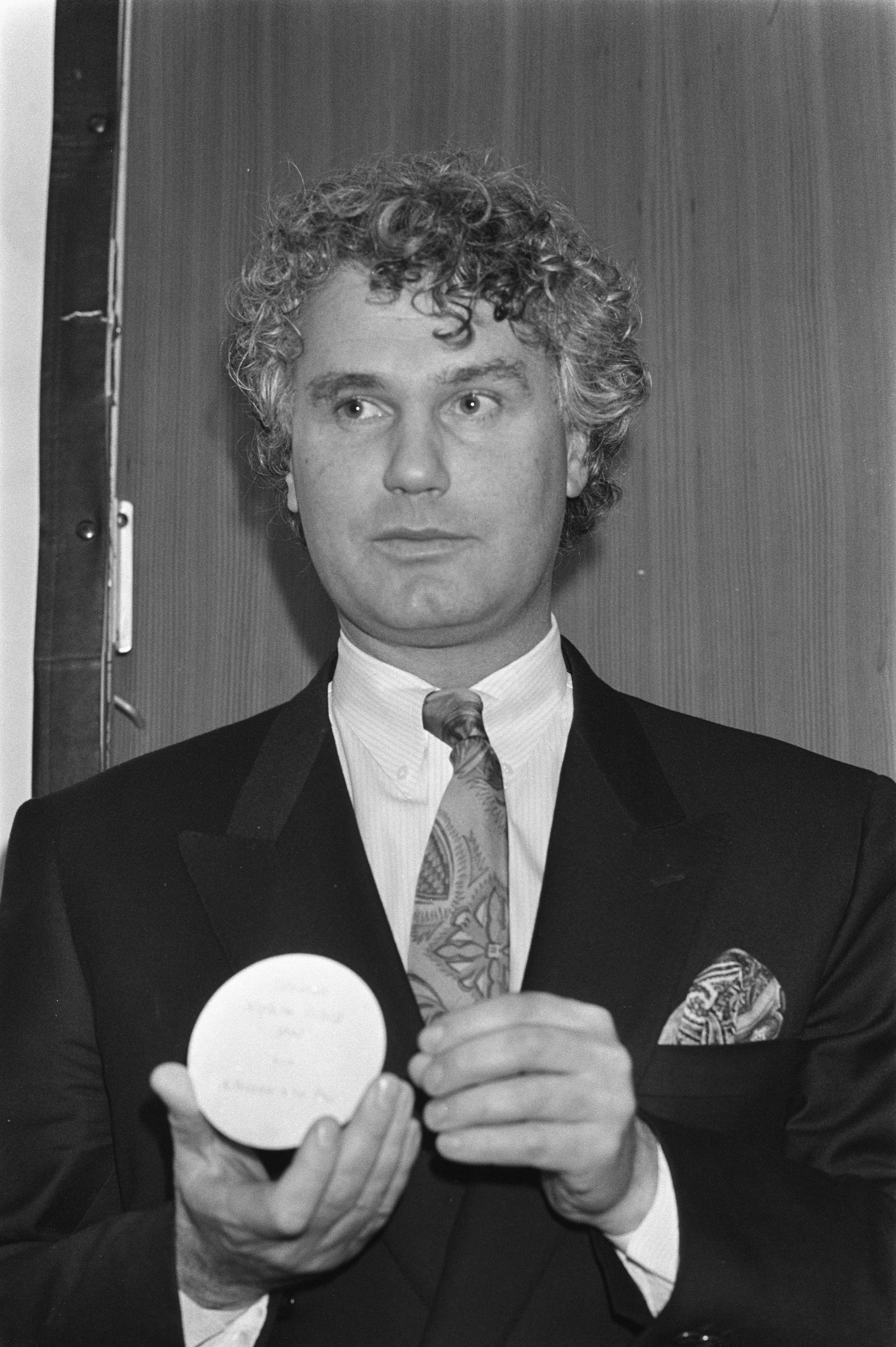
Adriaan van Dis (1986)

- 1986: Adriaan van Dis
- 1987: Levensberichten van Cherry Duyns
- 1988: De Laatste Voorziening van Schmidt en Doebele
- 1989: Nauwgezet en Wanhopig van Wim Kayzer
- 1991: Emile Fallaux, o.a. voor zijn videobrieven
- 1992: 4 Havo, een klas apart, van Schmidt en Doebele
- 1993: De Schreeuw van de Leeuw/De Leeuw is los
- 1994: Pleidooi
- 1995: Ireen van Ditshuyzen, hele oeuvre
- 1996: 30 minuten, by Arjan Ederveen en Pieter Kramer
- 1997: Veldpost
- 1998: Paul Witteman
- 1999: Oud Geld
- 2000: Een geschenk uit de hemel-De slag om de Brent Spar, Schuchen Tan en Kees de Groot
- 2001: Andere Tijden, Hans Goedkoop en Ad van Liempt
- 2002: Barend & Van Dorp
- 2003: Kopspijkers
- 2004: PaPaul
- 2005: Holland Sport and Tegenlicht
- 2006: Koefnoen
- 2007: Sporen uit het Oosten
- 2008: Van Dis in Afrika
- 2009: 't Vrije Schaep
- 2010: Kijken in de ziel
- 2011: De Wereld Draait Door
- 2012: Hanlon's helden
- 2013: Het nieuwe Rijksmuseum
- 2014: Ramses
- 2015: Onze man in Teheran
- 2016: Zondag met Lubach
- 2017: Schuldig
- 2018: De Luizenmoeder
- 2019: Stuk
- 2020: Brieven aan Andalusië
- 2021: Nieuwsuur
- 2022: BOOS
- 2023: Onze man bij de Taliban
- 2024: De Joodse Raad
