= Dutch Association of Journalists =

Dutch trade union

NVJ
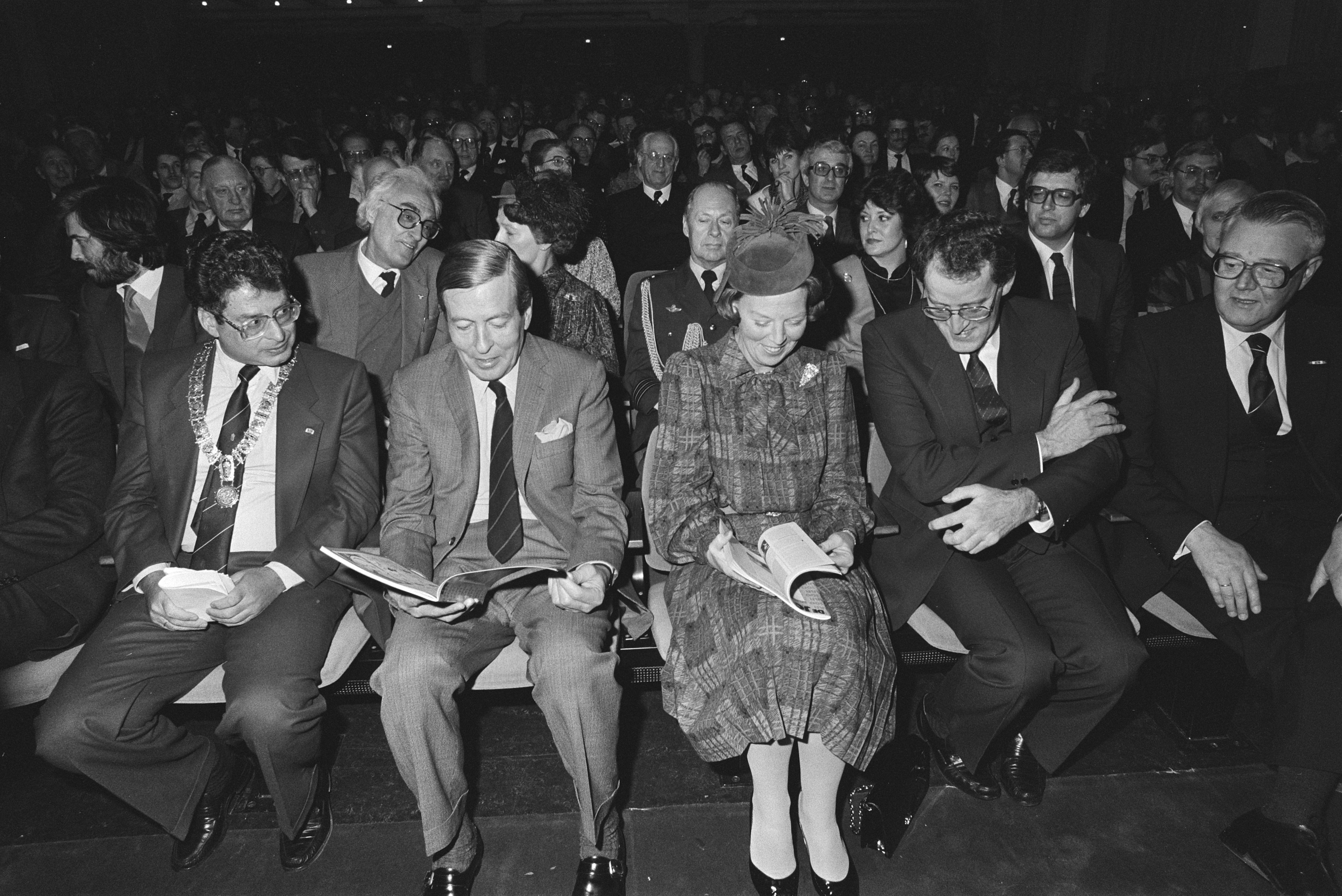
- Queen Beatrix and Prince Claus at the 100-year anniversary of the association
- Formation: 1884
- Headquarters: Amsterdam
- Location: Netherlands
- Members: 7904
- Chair: Folkert Jensma
- Affiliations: International Federation of Journalists (IFJ); European Federation of Journalists (EFJ)
- Website: Official website

The Dutch Association of Journalists (Dutch: Nederlandse Vereniging van Journalisten, NVJ) is a national trade union for journalists, part of the Federation of Dutch Trade Unions. Anyone who fits the description of journalist in the broadest sense of the term can become a member. This includes reporters, investigative journalists, photographers, editors and producers. Both those who work full-time or part-time in any of these capacities are members. The association publishes the Villamedia Magazine, focused on journalism news.

The aims of the association are to defend the freedom of the press against governmental and other threats, as well as to defend and improve the work conditions of journalists. The association also strives to defend and maintain journalistic integrity and ethics. It provides legal aid to its members, gives out press cards, and takes part in conflict-resolution between journalists and their employers, and engages in strike action.

As of November 2023 the chair of the NVJ is Folkert Jensma, former editor-in-chief of the NRC, who was elected with 95% of the vote. Rowan Blijd was elected vice-chair.

== History ==
In 1884 the Dutch Journalist Circle (Dutch: Nederlandse Journalisten Kring, NJK) was founded by A.G.C. van Duyl senior, then editor in chief of the Algemeen Dagblad. The NJK's aim was to increase solidarity among journalists and serve as a platform for them to discuss and advance their interests.

In 1898 prominent journalist, theologian and future Prime Minister Abraham Kuyper became chair of the NJK, greatly raising its reputation and influence.

Due to the pillarization of the Netherlands at the time, Catholics and Protestants set up their own alternative journalistic associations in the years after the NJK's founding. However, the NJK remained the largest and most influential, with the Catholic association having 14 publications as its members in 1902 as opposed to the 250 members of the NJK.

In 1949 the various journalistic associations decided to cooperate in the Federation of Dutch Journalists (FNJ), which in 1968, with the erosion of pillarization, combined to form the NVJ.

== Campaigns and actions ==
In 2022 the NVJ, together with other press freedom groups, began a legal case in the European Court of Justice against the banning of Russian state media channels RT and Sputnik in the wake of the Russia-Ukraine War. General-secretary of the NVJ Thomas Bruning said that although they do not agree with the state propaganda output of these channels, it is dangerous for the democratic order to allow governments to ban them.

On 30 November 2023 the NVJ engaged in a warning strike to express their dissatisfaction with negotiations over a new collective agreement concerning wages. Outlets such as De Volskrant, NRC, Trouw and Het Parool participated in the strike. On 18 December an agreement was reached between the NVJ and employers DGP Media and Mediahuis, with a 9.4 percent wage increase starting in January 2024, and an additional 2 percent in 2025.

In June 2024 it was reported that the Dutch General Intelligence and Security Service (AIVD) and Military Intelligence and Security Service (MIVD) had recruited journalists to act as their agents domestically and abroad, for which they were paid. This was confirmed in a parliamentary oversight committee (CTIVD) report. The NVJ criticized this, with its general-secretary Thomas Bruning saying: "I am ashamed of those who cooperate with this." The CTIVD also criticized the use of journalists by the AIVD and MIVD, saying they did not properly take into account the risks involved in this activity, particularly in high-risk foreign countries.

== International affiliations ==
The NVJ is a member of International Freedom of Expression Exchange, a virtual network of non-governmental organizations that protects the right to freedom of speech globally, and campaigns to defend journalists, writers and others who are persecuted for exercising their right to free speech.

De NVJ is a member of the European Federation of Journalists (EFJ) and the International Federation of Journalists (IFJ).

== Membership ==
Year	Membership	Comments
1997	7705	
1998	8140	
1999	8634	
2000	9025	
2001	9209	Increase in membership due in part to recruitment efforts started in 2000
2002	9530	
2003	9285	
2004	8998	
2005	8675	
2006	8480	
2007	8183	Loss of members due in part to purging of non-due paying members, shrinking of the journalistic profession, and reorganization of media sectors.
2008	8243	
2009	8313	
2010	8184	
2011	7944	
2012	7651	
2013	7398	
2020	7904	
2021	8320	
2022	7886	
