= Netherlands Defence Intelligence and Security Service =

Military intelligence agency in the Netherlands

Logo of the MIVD with its motto: Meritum in veritatem discernendo (Merit in discerning the truth)

The Defence Intelligence and Security Service (Dutch: Militaire Inlichtingen- en Veiligheidsdienst) is the military intelligence service of the Netherlands, which operates under the Ministry of Defence. It is tasked with investigating the security of the armed forces and collects military intelligence from and about foreign countries. The civilian counterpart is the General Intelligence and Security Service (AIVD), which operates under the Ministry of the Interior and Kingdom Relations.

== History ==
The forerunner of all intelligence services in the Netherlands was the GS III, which was created shortly before World War I. This service later (after WW II) became the LAMID (Army Intelligence Service). In 1986, the Government of the Netherlands started a reform of all (Navy, Army and Air Force) military intelligence and security services. The MID (Military Intelligence Service) was formed. In 1989 and 1990 the existing branches (Navy, Army, Air Force, General Intelligence) of the MID were united to make the service stronger. After that reform the single military intelligence service was renamed Defence Intelligence and Security Service (MIVD) in 2002, with more focus on challenges the 21st century would present. The MIVD is located on the grounds of the Frederick Barracks in The Hague.

== Mission ==
- Collecting information on potential and military forces in other countries;
- Collecting information on areas where Dutch troops may be stationed, notably on peace keeping missions;
- Investigating problems involving officers of the Royal Netherlands Army;
- Collecting information to prevent any harm to the Army;
- Counter-terrorism and counter-espionage;
- Other military matters as determined by the Government.

== Oversight and accountability ==
The Minister of Defence is politically responsible for the MIVD. Oversight is provided by two bodies:

- The Committee for the Intelligence and Security Services (Dutch: Commissie voor de Inlichtingen- en Veiligheidsdiensten), comprising the faction leaders of the major political parties represented in the House of Representatives.
- An Oversight Committee (Dutch: Commissie van Toezicht op de Inlichtingen- en Veiligheidsdiensten, CTIVD) appointed by the House of Representatives.

The MIVD, like the AIVD, is governed by the Wet op de Inlichtingen- en Veiligheidsdiensten 2017 (Intelligence and Security Services Act 2017).

== Criticism ==
In 2024 it was reported that the AIVD and MIVD had recruited journalists to act as their agents domestically and abroad, for which they were paid. This was confirmed in a CTIVD Oversight Committee report. The Dutch Association of Journalists criticized this, with its general-secretary Thomas Bruning saying: "I am ashamed of those who cooperate with this."

The CTIVD also criticized the use of journalists by the AIVD and MIVD, saying they did not properly take into account the risks involved in this activity, particularly in high-risk foreign countries.
