= Expeditie Robinson 2007 =

- Season 8
- Presented by: Ernst-Paul Hasselbach
- No. of days: 47
- No. of castaways: 100
- Winner: Vincent "Vinni" Arrendell
- Runner-up: Willem Hogeveen
- Location: Tengah Island, Malaysia
- No. of episodes: 13

Release
- Original network: RTL 5; 2BE
- Original release: September 30 – December 27, 2007

Season chronology
- ← Previous; 2006 Next → 2008

Expeditie Robinson: 2007 is the eighth Dutch/Belgian version of the Swedish show Expedition Robinson, or Survivor as it is referred to in some countries. This season began airing on September 30, 2007 and concluded on December 27, 2007.

== Season highlights ==
=== Major twist ===
The initial major twist this season was that for the first time in the history of any Survivor franchise, one hundred contestants would take part in a single season. This twist, however, didn't last very long, as in the second episode, twenty five of the contestants voluntarily left the game, in the following episode, twenty one contestants were eliminated, as they were not picked to be on either the North team or the South team, in the fourth episode, thirteen members of the North team were eliminated following a loss in the first immunity challenge, in the fifth episode, the entire South team was eliminated following their loss at the second immunity challenge, and in the sixth episode, eight members of the North team were eliminated following an elimination challenge to determine who would be the final group of contestants that would make up the jury and final two.

=== Secret Island ===
From episode 6 on, all eliminated contestants were sent to the "Secret island", those living on the island would each be given a chance to return to the game through a win at an immunity challenge or through a vote before the semi-finals. Aside from Nelleke and Kristien who left the competition in episode 10, and Frans who was ejected from episode 12, all contestants that went to the island remained there until the vote to return. Following the vote to return, Muriël returned to the competition. Muriel's return was short lived as she, Lieke, and Marcel were all eliminated in the semi-final rounds. Ultimately, it was Vincent who beat the odds and went on to win the season over Willem by a jury vote of 4-3.

== Top 20 contestants ==
Contestant	Original Tribe	Switched Tribe	Day 27 Tribe	Finish	Afvallerseiland
Arthur Roffelsen; 40, Amsterdam, Netherlands	North Team	North Team		Lost Challenge; Day 26	Declined; Day 26
Bart; 26, Harlingen, Netherlands	North Team	North Team		Lost Challenge; Day 26	Declined; Day 26
Brigitte Van Bakel; 51, Nijmegen, Netherlands	South Team	North Team		Lost Challenge; Day 26	Declined; Day 26
Frits Groen; 46, Bloemendaal, Netherlands	South Team	North Team		Lost Challenge; Day 26	Declined; Day 26
Ingeborg De Leenheer; 42, Roeselare, Belgium	North Team	North Team		Lost Challenge; Day 26	Declined; Day 26
Kenny Placin; 30, Ham, Belgium	South Team	North Team		Lost Challenge; Day 26	Declined; Day 26
Merel Groen; 25, Ammerzoden, Netherlands	South Team	North Team		Lost Challenge; Day 26	Declined; Day 26
Tim Da Costa Gomez; 26, Eindhoven, Netherlands	South Team	North Team		Lost Challenge; Day 26	Declined; Day 26
Nelleke de Graaf; 23, Noardburgum, Netherlands	North Team	North Team		Lost Challenge; Day 26	Left Competition; Day 37
Kristien van Lent; 21, Antwerp, Belgium	North Team	North Team	Rapang	1st Voted Out; Day 27	Left Competition; Day 37
Frans Baats; 51, Julianadorp, Netherlands	North Team	North Team		Lost Challenge; Day 26	Ejected; Day 43
Saskia Moll; 27, Laren, Netherlands	North Team	North Team	Rapang	2nd Voted Out; Day 30	Lost Challenge; 1st Jury Member; Day 45
Louis "Loek" Hofman; 39, The Hague, Netherlands	South Team	North Team	Rapang	4th Voted Out; Day 38	Lost Challenge; 2nd Jury Member; Day 45
Hans de Blauwe; 45, Dudzele, Belgium	North Team	North Team	Rapang	5th Voted Out; Day 42	Lost Challenge; 3rd Jury Member; Day 45
Mieke Deschodt; 23, Harelbeke, Belgium	North Team	North Team	Rapang	6th Voted Out; Day 44	Lost Challenge; 4th Jury Member; Day 45
Muriel Rosseel; Returned to Game	North Team	North Team	Rapang	3rd Voted Out; Day 35	Won Challenge; Day 45
Lieke van der Vorst; 25, Overloon, Netherlands	North Team	North Team	Rapang	Lost Challenge; 5th Jury Member; Day 46	
Marcel Sinnige; 39, Alkmaar, Netherlands	North Team	North Team	Rapang	Lost Challenge; 6th Jury Member; Day 46	
Muriel Rosseel; 37, Bredene, Belgium	North Team	North Team	Rapang	Lost Challenge; 7th Jury Member; Day 46	
Willem Hogeveen; 48, Zeewolde, Netherlands	North Team	North Team	Rapang	Runner-Up; Day 46	
Vincent "Vinni" Arrendell; 35, Antwerp, Belgium	North Team	North Team	Rapang	Robinson; Day 46	

== Voting history ==
	Pre-Tribes		Original Tribes	Post Kidnap		Merge													
Episode #:	2	3	4	5	6	7	8	9	10			11	12		13				
Day #:	7	12	15	18	23	25	28	32	33		36	40	41	43	46	47			
Eliminated:	The Quitters	Those Not; Picked	Anoushka, Andre, Christel, Corina, Gina, Heidi, Manon, Margo, Nadja, Noel, Sammy, Walther, Wim	South Team^{1}	Arthur, Bart, Brigitte, Frits, Ingeborg, Kenny, Merel, Tim^{2}	Kristien; 6/10 votes	Saskia; 4/9 votes	Muriël; 3/8 votes^{3}	Nelleke; No vote	Kristien; No vote	Loek; 6/7 votes	Hans; 3/6 votes	Frans; No vote	Mieke; 3/4 votes^{4}	Muriël; 5/11 votes^{5}	Lieke, Marcel, Muriël; No vote		Willem; 3/7 votes	Vincent; 4/7 votes
Voter	Vote																		
Vincent		North Team	Lost	Won	Won	Saskia	Saskia	Muriël			Loek	Mieke		Mieke		Won		Jury Vote	
Willem		North Team	Lost	Won	Won	Kristien	Hans	Loek			Loek	Hans		Mieke		Lost	1st	Jury Vote	
Muriël		North Team	Lost	Won	Won	Kristien	Lieke	Hans	On Secret Island						Loek	Lost	2nd		Vincent
Marcel		North Team	Lost	Won	Won	Kristien	Saskia	Loek			Loek	Hans		Mieke		Lost	3rd		Vincent
Lieke		North Team	Lost	Won	Won	Muriël	Muriël	Muriël			Loek	Vincent		~~Marcel~~		Lost	4th	Willem	
Mieke		North Team	Lost	Won	Won	Saskia	Saskia	Muriël			Loek	Hans		Willem	Muriël				Vincent
Hans		North Team	Lost	Won	Won	Kristien	Saskia	Loek			Loek	Vincent	On Secret Island		Muriël				Vincent
Loek		South Team	Won	Won	Won	Kristien	Vincent	Hans			Marcel	On Secret Island			Muriël			Willem	
Saskia		North Team	Lost	Won	Won	Kristien	Vincent	On Secret Island							Muriël			Willem	
Kristien		North Team	Lost	Won	Won	Saskia	On Secret Island												
Frans		North Team	Lost	Won	Accepted Offer	On Secret Island													
Nelleke		North Team	Lost	Won	Accepted Offer	On Secret Island													
Arthur		North Team	Lost	Won	Declined Offer														
Bart		North Team	Lost	Won	Declined Offer														
Brigitte		South Team	Won	Won	Declined Offer														
Frits		South Team	Won	Won	Declined Offer														
Ingeborg		Tribe Leader	Lost	Won	Declined Offer														
Kenny		South Team	Won	Won	Declined Offer														
Merel		South Team	Won	Won	Declined Offer														
Tim		South Team	Won	Won	Declined Offer														
Angelique		South Team	Won	Lost															
Bruno		South Team	Won	Lost															
Carrie		South Team	Won	Lost															
Cengiz		South Team	Won	Lost															
Cynthia		South Team	Won	Lost															
Els #1		South Team	Won	Lost															
Els #2		South Team	Won	Lost															
Elsie		South Team	Won	Lost															
Kimo		South Team	Won	Lost															
Lesley		South Team	Won	Lost															
Lotus		South Team	Won	Lost															
Machteld		South Team	Won	Lost															
Mathilde		South Team	Won	Lost															
Michiel		South Team	Won	Lost															
Oda		South Team	Won	Lost															
Romain		South Team	Won	Lost															
Rudi		Tribe Leader	Won	Lost															
Siegrieke		South Team	Won	Lost															
Sylvia		South Team	Won	Lost															
Walter		South Team	Won	Lost															
Anoushka		North Team	Lost																
Andre		North Team	Lost																
Christel		North Team	Lost																
Corina		North Team	Lost																
Gina		North Team	Lost																
Heidi		North Team	Lost																
Manon		North Team	Lost																
Margo		North Team	Lost																
Nadja		North Team	Lost																
Noel		North Team	Lost																
Sammy		North Team	Lost																
Walther		North Team	Lost																
Wim		North Team	Lost																
Farrah		South Team	Quit																
Alain		Not Picked																	
Anders		Not Picked																	
Bob		Not Picked																	
Carl		Not Picked																	
Eveline		Not Picked																	
Greet		Not Picked																	
Gregory		Not Picked																	
Irma		Not Picked																	
Jolien		Not Picked																	
Koen		Not Picked																	
Lisbeth		Not Picked																	
Mirjam		Not Picked																	
Nico		Not Picked																	
Niels		Not Picked																	
Nikolas		Not Picked																	
Robin		Not Picked																	
Sven		Not Picked																	
Thony		Not Picked																	
Tim S.		Not Picked																	
Xanthippe		Not Picked																	
Yuliya		Not Picked																	
Albert																			
Angela																			
Davy																			
Delphine																			
Edit																			
Elke																			
Gemma																			
Inge																			
Iraida																			
Joey																			
Joop																			
Kay																			
Kenneth																			
Luc																			
Lydia																			
Melvin																			
Ronny																			
Rutger																			
Sabrina																			
Sam																			
Taco																			
Tessa																			
Thierry																			
Werner																			
Wesley																			

^1 In episode 5, the tribes competed in a sudden death immunity challenge in which the losing tribe would be eliminated.

^2 In episode 6, the members of the red tribe competed in a sudden death individual challenge in order to determine which twelve contestants would be eligible to be part of the jury.

^3 Following the third tribal council vote, there was a tie between Loek and Muriël. As Muriël had received more votes than Loek at prior tribal councils she was eliminated.

^4 At the sixth tribal council, Lieke voided her own vote.

^5 Prior to the semi-finals, the contestants living on the Secret island took part in a series of challenges which if won would grant them extra votes in the vote for which contestant should return to the game. Hans and Mieke earned 2 extra votes, Muriël and Saskia earned 1.
