= Expeditie Robinson 2006 =

- Season 7
- Presented by: Ernst-Paul Hasselbach
- No. of days: 49
- No. of castaways: 16
- Winner: Olga Urashova
- Runner-up: Lenny Janssen
- Location: Pearl Islands, Panama
- No. of episodes: 13

Release
- Original network: RTL 5; 2BE
- Original release: August 28 – November 20, 2006

Season chronology
- ← Previous; Battle of the Titans Next → 2007

Expeditie Robinson 2006 is the seventh Dutch/Belgian version of the Swedish show Expedition Robinson, or Survivor, as it is referred to in some countries. This season began airing on August 28, 2006 and concluded on November 20, 2006.

== Season summary ==
The major twist this season was that the tribes were initially divided up by gender, with one "All-Star" contestant joining each tribe. These two All-Stars were Klaar Lippe and Robin Ibens. Though the main twist may have seemed like a repeat of twists that occurred in previous seasons, unlike previous seasons with a similar twist this season, male contestants were from Belgium and all females from the Netherlands. While the All-Star contestants weren't eligible to win, they could vote and following a tribal swap in the fourth episode, they could give any contestant on their tribe immunity at tribal council.

Following the merge in the eight episode, the twist that was "Losers Island" was introduced to the game. After a contestant was eliminated, they would be sent to Losers Island, where they would wait until there were only two contestants left in the game, at which point the six contestants on the island would vote for one of their own to return. When it came time to vote for a winner, the public, instead of a jury decided the winner. In the end, it was Olga Urashova, who returned from Losers Island in the final three, who won the season over Lenny Janssen with a public vote of 52% to Janssen's 48%.

== Finishing order ==
Contestant	Original Tribe	Mixed Tribe	Merged Tribe	Finish
Susanna Pronk; 38, Rotterdam, Netherlands	North Team			Left Competition; Day 3
Frederik Man; 19, Roeselare, Belgium	South Team			Left Competition; Day 6
Matthijs Leenknecht; 26, Wevelgem, Belgium	South Team			Left Competition; Day 7
Patricia Langiusa; 28, Zaandam, Netherlands	North Team			Left Competition; Day 11
Saron Emden; 32, Amsterdam, Netherlands	North Team			Left Competition; Day 11
Michelle Hendrikx; 21, Landgraaf, Netherlands	North Team	South Team		3rd Voted Out; Day 16
Werner Leysen; 33, Brasschaat, Belgium	South Team	South Team		4th Voted Out; Day 19
Bert Selleslags; 35, Bazel, Belgium	South Team	South Team		5th Voted Out; Day 23
Olga Urashova; Returned to game	North Team	South Team	Casaya	6th Voted Out; Day 27
Koen Deloose; 40, Antwerp, Belgium	South Team	South Team	Casaya	7th Voted Out; Day 31; Lost Vote; Day 46
Curd Velghe; 40, Harelbeke, Belgium	South Team	North Team	Casaya	8th Voted Out; Day 35; Lost Vote; Day 46
Wietske de Meer; 41, Zwolle, Netherlands	North Team	North Team	Casaya	9th Voted Out; Day 39; Lost Vote; Day 46
Linda van Eijk; 23, Almere, Netherlands	North Team	North Team	Casaya	10th Voted Out; Day 42; Lost Vote; Day 46
Ignazio Nicolo; 48, Maasmechelen, Belgium	South Team	North Team	Casaya	11th Voted Out; Day 45; Lost Vote; Day 46
Bernadette Mittendorf; 46, Borne, Netherlands	North Team	South Team	Casaya	12th Voted Out; Day 49
Lenny Janssen; 24, Temse, Belgium	South Team	North Team	Casaya	Runner-Up; Day 49
Olga Urashova; 25, Hoofddorp, Netherlands	North Team	South Team	Casaya	Sole Survivor; Day 49

== Voting history ==
	Original Tribes							Mixed Tribes			Merged Tribe								
Episode #:	2		3			4	5		6	7	8	9	10	11	12	13	Reunion		
Eliminated:	Susanna; No vote	~~Saron~~; 4/8 votes^{1}, ^{2}	Frederik; No vote	Matthijs; No vote	~~Curd~~; 4/7 votes^{2}, ^{3}	Patricia; No vote	Saron; No vote	Michelle; 5/7 votes^{1}	Werner; 4/6 votes^{1}	Bert; 3/4 votes	Olga; 6/10 votes^{4}	Koen; 4/7 votes	Curd; 5/6 votes	Wietske; 3/5 votes	Linda; 3/4 votes	Ignazio; 2/5 votes^{5}	Bernadette; 2/5 votes^{6}	Lenny; 48% to win^{7}	Olga; 52% to win^{7}
Voter	Vote																		
Olga		Linda						Michelle	Bert	Bert	Linda; Linda	On Loser's Island					Survived	Sole Survivor	
Lenny					Curd						Olga	Linda	Curd	Wietske	Linda	Ignazio	Immune	Runner-Up	
Bernadette		Patricia						Michelle	Werner	Bert	Linda	Linda	Curd	Wietske	Linda	Ignazio	Eliminated		
Ignazio					Bert						Olga; Olga	Koen	Curd	Wietske	Linda	Bernadette	Bernadette		
Linda		Saron									Olga	Koen	Curd	Bernadette	Bernadette	On Loser's Island	Olga		
Wietske		Saron									Olga	Koen	Curd	Bernadette	On Loser's Island		Bernadette		
Curd					Bert						Olga	Koen	Ignazio	On Loser's Island			Olga		
Koen					Curd			Michelle	Werner	Bert	Linda	Curd	On Loser's Island				Olga		
Bert					Curd			Michelle	Werner	Olga									
Werner					Curd			Michelle	Koen										
Michelle		Saron						Bert											
Saron		Patricia																	
Patricia		Saron																	
Matthijs																			
Frederik																			
Susanna																			
Klaar		Patricia						Bert	Werner										
Robin					Koen														

^1 As Klaar and Robin were the two returning All-Stars this season neither could win or be voted out.

^2 As Susanna voluntarily left the competition in episode 1, no one was eliminated at the first tribal council.

^3 As Matthijs voluntarily left the competition in episode 3, no one was eliminated at the second tribal council.

^4 When Klaar and Robin left the competition they each were allowed to grant one member of their tribe two votes at the first tribal council following the merge. Klaar chose Olga and Robin chose Ignazio.

^5 Bernadette had extra one black vote and one neutralizing (white) vote.

^6 Immediately following Ignzaio's elimination, all contestants living on Loser's island voted for one of their own to return to the game. Olga won the vote and competed against Bernadette and Lenny in the final immunity challenge of the season. Lenny won the challenge and was immune from the final vote in which contestants that had lived on Loser's island voted for who of Bernadette and Lenny they wanted to see in the final two.

^7 It was decided that instead of having a jury vote this season, the winner would be decided by a public vote.
