= How Clean Is Your House? =

British television programme

- Starring: Aggie MacKenzie; Kim Woodburn
- Narrated by: Paul Copley
- Country of origin: United Kingdom
- Original language: English

Production
- Running time: 30 min (includes ads)
- Production company: Talkback Thames

Original release
- Network: Channel 4
- Release: 21 May 2003 – 21 September 2009

How Clean Is Your House? is a British entertainment/lifestyle television programme in which expert cleaners Kim Woodburn and Aggie MacKenzie visit dirty houses and clean them up. The thirty-minute show was produced by Talkback Thames, the UK production arm of Fremantle (itself part of the RTL Group), and aired on Channel 4 from 2003 to 2009. Though a ratings success, Channel 4 announced that they had decided to cancel the series in 2009 in order to make way for new programming.

== Format ==
Each episode of the programme followed the same formula. Accompanied by a dramatic score of horror movie music, Woodburn and MacKenzie explore the house on their own, examining the extent of the mess and looking for any particularly horrible areas. They then meet the resident before the cleaning begins, assisted by several professional cleaners. During this process, which takes up the bulk of the show, tips are shared for tackling particular cleaning tasks with the residents, often utilising traditional cleaning methods in addition to typical chemical cleaning products.

During the cleaning, MacKenzie takes swab samples from the filthiest areas of the house and has them analysed in a lab, often revealing numerous kinds of bacteria, frequently E. coli and Salmonella. Residents of the homes often have health problems that directly stem from the air quality or pathogens present before cleaning; MacKenzie will show the residents her findings in an effort to make them understand the connection between their health and their home's condition.

The final section of the show has Woodburn and MacKenzie unveiling the freshly cleaned home to the resident. In earlier episodes, they would return to the home two weeks later to see if the cleaning was being maintained.

The show makes a point of thoroughly cleaning carpets and furniture the resident owns, and not replacing dirty or worn items just for the sake of the final reveal. In a few particular cases in which a resident lacked basic items of furniture (such as one who might have been sleeping on a mattress on the floor rather than a bed), Kim and Aggie might coordinate with neighbours or local secondhand shops to donate items.

Woodburn takes the role of a dominating woman, scolding residents for letting their homes get so bad. She is sometimes playfully flirtatious with male residents. In contrast, MacKenzie (whose previous jobs included associate editor in Good Housekeeping and working for MI6) assumes the more serious "dirt detective" role, performing such tasks as the bacterial analysis. She plays at being more squeamish than Woodburn, claiming that she will be sick or run away from a particularly horrific home. While cleaning, both wear industrial white suits and rubber gloves adorned with marabou feathers and fake gemstones.

Actor Paul Copley provides tongue-in-cheek, often alliterative voice-over narration for each episode. The show is light-hearted and often camp, falling just as much into the entertainment category than the factual genre. Much of the appeal comes from the voyeuristic pleasure of seeing how untidy some people let their houses become (many have not been cleaned for years) and the reactions of the show's two stars, though the cleaning tips add some practical value to the show.

== Final series ==
The sixth and final series aired in the UK on Channel 4 from 13 August–24 September 2009, and was (for the first time) also broadcast in High Definition on Channel 4 HD. Primarily the same format as previous editions, Kim and Aggie continued to seek out "the UK's filthiest homes", however, the programme was promoted as delving far deeper into the psyche of the home owners. In addition, the two-week "check-up" was omitted from the show's formula, but Kim and Aggie undertook a roadshow style appearance in each episode where they would meet members of the public to answer questions and offer cleaning tips.

In November 2009, Channel 4 announced that they had decided to end the series after six years as part of its ongoing "creative renewal" for programming. Channel 4's head of programming, Julian Bellamy, said the series had been one of several "huge hits" for the channel, but that his focus was now on "finding the next generation of groundbreaking shows".

== DVD and VHS releases ==
How Clean Is Your House? received a release on both DVD and VHS in the UK on 8 November 2004.

How Clean Is Your House? USA Seasons 1 & 2 was released on DVD in the US on 4 March 2008.

== Spin-offs ==
A spin-off book, How Clean Is Your House?, written by Kim and Aggie, was published in 2003. FremantleMedia has also signed licensing and merchandising deals with many cleaning product manufacturers and other companies.

In 2004, Kim and Aggie made a spin-off series called Too Posh to Wash about the personal hygiene of upper-class people, including one participant who had never washed her bra. They also did a one-off special, When Kim & Aggie Went to Hospital which aired on 30 August 2006, about how to keep our hospitals clean. In this hour-long special, the pair travelled to Ealing Hospital which has often been criticised for poor hygiene conditions and regularly finishes at the bottom of the NHS Hospital League Tables. It was more serious in tone compared to How Clean Is Your House?

== International versions ==
The format has been adapted to many other countries. A United States version, also starring Kim and Aggie, premiered in September 2004 on the Lifetime network and ran for two seasons. This edition also aired in the UK on Channel 4. This version has been criticized for using product placement such as Mr Clean and Bounty instead of the homemade cleaning solutions that the UK version uses. Both the UK & US versions aired in Canada on the W Network and in Australia on cable television channel UK.TV.

A Dutch version titled Hoe schoon is jouw huis? (a literal translation of the original English title) has been made with two Dutch ladies performing the same role as Kim and Aggie do in the original. The show aired on the commercial RTL 4 channel and has been rerun on RTL-5. The original British series also aired on Dutch television under the Dutch title.

A French version titled C'est du Propre! ("Now That's Clean!") aired on M6 and on other channels of the M6 group (Téva, W9). The French "cleaning ladies" are Danièle Odin and Béatrice de Malembert. Two tie-in books have been published.

- Belgium: Schoon en Meedogenloos
- Bosnia and Herzegovina: Odred za čistoću
- Croatia: Odred za čistoću
- Czech Republic: Máte doma uklizeno?
- Finland: Sillä siisti
- France: C'est du propre !
- Germany: Die Putzteufel - Deutschland macht sauber
- Greece: Αστραφτερά Σπίτια
- Hungary: Tiszta a lakásod?
- Iceland: Allt í drasli
- Italy: Case da incubo
- New Zealand: How Clean is Your House?
- Netherlands: Hoe schoon is jouw Huis?
- Norway: Ekstrem Rengjøring (Extreme Cleaning)
- Philippines: Pilipinas Instant Bahay Makeover TV5 (June 2020)
- Poland: Czysta chata
- Romania: Curat Murdar
- Russia: Две блондинки против грязи
- Spain: Hogar, sucio hogar
- Sweden: Rent Hus (Clean House)
- Vietnam: Nhà bẩn - Nhà sạch? (VTV3)
