= Kim's Rude Awakenings =

Canadian television programme (2008–2009)

- Directed by: Dennis Beauchamp
- Starring: Kim Woodburn; Mike Chalut
- Narrated by: Gary Bernarde
- Country of origin: Canada
- Original language: English
- No. of seasons: 2
- No. of episodes: 27

Production
- Executive producers: Simon Lloyd; Glen Salzman; Claire Vande Polder
- Running time: 30 min (inc. advertisements)
- Production companies: Cineflix; Nextfilm Productions

Original release
- Network: W Network
- Release: March 4, 2008 – May 4, 2009

Kim's Rude Awakenings is a Canadian television programme, starring British expert cleaner and television personality Kim Woodburn. The programme followed a similar format to the British programme How Clean Is Your House?, also starring Woodburn in which she visits family homes in an attempt to help them clean and declutter. She was accompanied in each episode by Mike Chalut. It aired for two seasons on W Network between March 4, 2008, and May 4, 2009.

== Production ==
Prior to the commissioning of the show, Kim Woodburn had appeared on the British series How Clean Is Your House? alongside Aggie MacKenzie since 2003, in which the pair visited dirty houses and cleaned them up. In 2007, it was announced that Woodburn would film a version of the show in Canada, titled Kim's Rude Awakenings. The show followed a similar format to its British counterpart, however Woodburn was instead accompanied by Mike Chalut, and the homes they visited were mostly untidy rather than dirty. The first season of the show began airing on W Network on March 4, 2008, and was subsequently renewed for a second and final series which concluded on May 4, 2009.

== Episodes ==
| Season | Episodes | Originally released | |
| Season | Episodes | First released | Last released |
|---|---|---|---|
| 1 | 14 | May 4, 2008 | July 26, 2008 |
| 2 | 13 | February 2, 2009 | May 4, 2009 |

=== Season 1 (2008) ===
| No. overall | No. in series | Title | Original release date |
|---|---|---|---|
| 1 | 1 | "The Black Family" | March 4, 2008 |
| 2 | 2 | "The Goode Family" | March 11, 2008 |
| 3 | 3 | "The Edwards Family" | March 18, 2008 |
| 4 | 4 | "The Tetreault Family" | March 25, 2008 |
| 5 | 5 | "The Galleas Family" | April 1, 2008 |
| 6 | 6 | "The Hurds Family" | April 8, 2008 |
| 7 | 7 | "The Breens" | April 15, 2008 |
| 8 | 8 | "The Cheshires" | April 22, 2008 |
| 10 | 10 | "The Alexander Bapties" | May 2, 2008 |
| 11 | 11 | "The Gaboury Family" | June 30, 2008 |
| 12 | 12 | "The Medina Family" | June 30, 2008 |
| 13 | 13 | "The Morgan Mackenzie Family" | July 26, 2008 |
| 14 | 14 | "The Beck Family" | July 26, 2008 |

=== Season 2 (2009) ===
| No. overall | No. in series | Title | Original release date |
|---|---|---|---|
| 15 | 1 | "The Ta's" | February 2, 2009 |
| 16 | 2 | "The Byrnes" | February 9, 2009 |
| 17 | 3 | "The Nickeles" | February 16, 2009 |
| 18 | 4 | "The Butlers" | February 23, 2009 |
| 19 | 5 | "The Kennys" | March 2, 2009 |
| 20 | 6 | "The Pretes" | March 9, 2009 |
| 21 | 7 | "The Carenzas" | March 16, 2009 |
| 22 | 8 | "The Harrisons" | March 23, 2009 |
| 23 | 9 | "The Hallmans" | March 30, 2009 |
| 24 | 10 | "The McKnights" | April 6, 2009 |
| 25 | 11 | "The Kuhns" | April 20, 2009 |
| 26 | 12 | "The Pattons" | April 27, 2009 |
| 27 | 13 | "The Kuryllowiczes" | May 4, 2009 |

== Reception ==
Woodburn received praise from viewers, who found her funny. Reviewing the first season, John Doyle of The Globe and Mail criticised the show, branding it "dire". Comparing it to the British counterpart How Clean Is Your House?, which he did however say he "understood the appeal of", he noted that the Canadian series "had more to do with disorganization. The Canadian homes she invades aren't dangerously dirty. They're merely messy. Still, Woodburn uses her well-polished shtick to lecture the families on getting organized. You see one of these shows, you've seen 'em all."
