= Expeditie Robinson: Battle of the Titans =

- Presented by: Ernst-Paul Hasselbach
- No. of days: 30
- No. of castaways: 17
- Winner: Ryan van Esch
- Runner-up: Jennifer Smit
- Location: Palawan, Philippines
- No. of episodes: 10

Release
- Original network: RTL 5; 2BE
- Original release: March 27 – May 29, 2006

Season chronology
- ← Previous; 2005 Next → 2006

Expeditie Robinson: Strijd der Titanen (also known as Expeditie Robinson: Battle of the Titans) is a special all-stars season of the Dutch/Belgian version of the Swedish show Expedition Robinson, or Survivor, as it is referred to in some countries. This season began airing in March 2006 and concluded in May of that year.

== Season summary ==
This season began with a surprise "plank" challenge, in which the winner would automatically be immune from the first elimination, and would be one of two contestants to be "leaders" of a tribe. As the winner of this challenge, Ilona van der Laan, along with Veronique De Pryker, who van der Laan picked as the person she got along with the least, picked their tribes from the fifteen other contestants. The last person not picked, Björn Lemeirel, was eliminated from the game.

Another twist occurred in episode four, when each tribe was asked to pick one player that they trusted the most. The North team chose Melvin Pigot, while the South team chose Richard Mackowia. These two contestants were both sent to a secret island called Entatula where the merge tribe of Panga would live. Eventually, those living on the island had chosen all but Fleur Roozenburg, Lydia Guiso, Maxime Verbist, Ryan van Esch, and Veronique De Pryker to join them, they composed the Miniloc tribe and were forced to take part in a series of duels until only one remained and would return to the game.

When it came time for the final four, the contestants took part in a couple of final challenges in order to determine who would be the finalists. The first of these challenges was won by Jennifer Smit while the second was won by Ryan van Esch. Ultimately, it was van Esch who won this season over Smit by a jury vote of 4-2.

== Finishing order ==
Contestant	Original tribe	Merged tribe (With Miniloc)	Merged tribe (Post Miniloc)	Finish
Björn Lemeire; 37, Gistel, Belgium; Season 4, 8th Place	None			Not Picked; Day 4
Ernestine Schweig; 46, Amsterdam, Netherlands; Season 5, 14th Place	North Team			1st Voted Out; Day 7
Ilona van der Laan; 25, Amsterdam, Netherlands; Season 4, 3rd Place	North Team			2nd Voted Out; Day 11
Jakobien Huisman; 36, Antwerp, Belgium; Season 3, 8th Place	South Team			3rd Voted Out; Day 14
Douwe Popma; 49, Veldhoven, Netherlands; Season 6, 7th Place	South Team			4th Voted Out; Day 17
Maxime Verbist; 27, Barcelona, Spain; Season 6, 8th Place	North Team	Miniloc		Lost Duel; Day 18
Melvin Pigot; 37, Paramaribo, Suriname; Season 1, 3rd Place	North Team	Panga		5th Voted Out; 1st Jury Member; Day 20
Fleur Roozenburg; 25, The Hague, Netherlands; Season 6, 4th Place	North Team	Miniloc		Lost Duel; Day 21
Pieter d'Hane; 40, Rotterdam, Netherlands; Season 2, 3rd Place	South Team	Panga		6th Voted Out; 2nd Jury Member; Day 23
Veronique De Pryker; 38, Sint-Niklaas, Belgium; Season 1, 6th Place	South Team	Miniloc		Lost Duel; Day 24
Mick Van Poelvoorde; 41, Schepdaal, Belgium; Season 5, 7th Place	North Team	Panga		7th Voted Out; 3rd Jury Member; Day 26
Lydia Guiso; 23, Sint-Niklaas, Belgium; Season 3, 7th Place	North Team	Miniloc		Lost Duel; Day 27
Karin Lindenhovius; 32, Doetinchem, Netherlands; Season 1, Sole Survivor	North Team	Panga	Panga	8th Voted Out; 4th Jury Member; Day 28
Richard Mackowiak; 49, Bilzen, Belgium; Season 2, Sole Survivor	South Team	Panga	Panga	Lost Challenge; 5th Jury Member; Day 30
Frank De Meulder; 39, Schilde, Belgium; Season 5, Sole Survivor	South Team	Panga	Panga	Lost Challenge; 6th Jury Member; Day 30
Jennifer Smit; 47, Arendonk, Belgium; Season 2, 6th Place	South Team	Panga	Panga	Runner-Up; Day 30
Ryan van Esch; 39, Uden, Netherlands; Season 4, 7th Place	South Team	Miniloc	Panga	Sole Survivor; Day 30

== Voting history ==
	No Tribes	Original Tribes		Entatula			Merged Tribe											
Episode #:	1	2	3	4		5	6		7		8		9		10			
Eliminated:	Björn; No vote	Ernestine; 5/8 votes	Ilona; 4/7 votes	Tie^{1}	Jakobien; 3/5 votes	Douwe; 2/3 votes	Maxime; No vote	Melvin; 4/7 votes	Fleur; No vote	Pieter; 3/6 votes^{2}	Veronique; No vote	Mick; 3/5 votes	Lydia; No vote	Karin; 3/4 votes	Richard; Frank; No vote		Jennifer; 2/6 votes	Ryan; 4/6 votes
Voter	Vote																	
Ryan	South Team			Jakobien	Jakobien	Douwe	Won		Won		Won		Won	Hidden		Won	Jury Vote	
Jennifer	South Team			Panga				Melvin		Karin		Mick		Karin	Won		Jury Vote	
Frank	South Team			Panga				Melvin		Pieter		Mick		Karin		Lost	Jennifer	
Richard	South Team			Panga				Melvin		Karin		Mick		Karin		Lost	Jennifer	
Karin	North Team	Ernestine	Lydia			Panga		Jennifer		Pieter		Jennifer		Jennifer				Ryan
Lydia	North Team	Ernestine	Ilona				Won		Won		Won		Lost					
Mick	North Team	Ernestine	Ilona			Panga		Pieter		Pieter		Karin						Ryan
Veronique	South Team			Douwe	Douwe	Douwe	Won		Won		Lost							
Pieter	South Team			Jakobien	Jakobien	Panga		Melvin		Karin								Ryan
Fleur	North Team	Ernestine	Ilona				Won		Lost									
Melvin	North Team	Ernestine	Ilona	Panga				Jennifer										Ryan
Maxime	North Team	Lydia	Lydia				Lost											
Douwe	South Team			Ryan	Jakobien	Ryan												
Jakobien	South Team			Douwe	Douwe													
Ilona	North Team	Lydia	Lydia															
Ernestine	North Team	Lydia																
Björn	Not Picked																	

^1 As both Douwe and Jakobien received two votes at the third tribal council, there was a re-vote in order to determine who would be eliminated. During said re-vote any member of the South team could receive votes.

^2 As both Karin and Pieter received three votes at the sixth tribal council, the number of votes received at previous tribal councils was used to determine who would be eliminated.
