= Expeditie Robinson 2008 =

- Season 10
- Presented by: Ernst-Paul Hasselbach
- No. of days: 47
- No. of castaways: 16
- Winner: Yin Oei Sian
- Runner-up: Hans Meenhorst
- Location: Malaysia
- No. of episodes: 13

Release
- Original network: RTL 5; 2BE
- Original release: August 31 – November 23, 2008

Season chronology
- ← Previous; 2007 Next → 2009

Expeditie Robinson 2008 is the tenth season of the RTL 5 and 2BE reality television series Expeditie Robinson.

The show premiered on August 31, 2008. The main twist this season was that it is a 'back-to-basics' season. This was the last season to be hosted by Ernst-Paul Hasselbach, as he died in a car accident on October 11, 2008 in Lom Municipality, Norway.

== Contestants ==
Contestant	Original Tribe	Merged Tribe	Finish
Marleen Haveman; 48, Kanne, Belgium	Tengah		1st Voted Out; Day 3
Dirk van Hoeydonck; 25, Antwerp, Belgium	Uma		2nd Voted Out; Day 6
Claudia Slok Soede; 28, Amsterdam, Netherlands	Tengah		3rd Voted Out; Day 9
Mano Dijkman; 38, Doesburg, Netherlands	Uma		Left Competition; Day 11
Hicham Maachi; 23, Gorinchem, Netherlands	Tengah		Left Competition; Day 11
Hannie Derks; 40, Eindhoven, Netherlands	Uma		4th Voted Out; Day 12
Wim Geens; 51, Erps-Kwerps, Belgium	Tengah		5th Voted Out; Day 15
Prince Heyliger; 33, Zutphen, Netherlands	Tengah		6th Voted Out; Day 18
Geert de Deyn; 39, Welle, Belgium	Uma	Lima	7th Voted Out; 1st jury member Day 24
Kyra van Oostveldt; 25, Antwerp, Belgium	Uma	Lima	8th Voted Out; 2nd jury member Day 27
Sarah de Graeve; 24, Brasschaat, Belgium	Tengah	Lima	9th Voted Out; 3rd jury member Day 30
Geert van Tornhaut; 43, Aalter, Belgium	Tengah	Lima	10th Voted Out; 4th jury member Day 35
Sharon Berndsen; 25, Dieren, Netherlands	Uma	Lima	11th Voted Out; 5th jury member Day 40
HiuKwan Chung; 23, Groningen, Netherlands	Tengah	Lima	12th Voted Out; 6th jury member Day 45
Hans Meenhorst; 47, Vinkel, Netherlands	Uma	Lima	Runner-up; Day 47
Yin Oei Sian; 36, Turnhout, Belgium	Uma	Lima	Robinson; Day 47

== Voting history ==
Contestant	Council 1	Council 2	Council 3	Council 4	Council 5	Council 6	Council 7	Council 8	Council 9	Council 10	Council 11	Final Council	Live Finale
Yin Oei; 0 votes		Dirk		Geert D		Prince	Geert D	Kyra	Sarah	HiuKwan	Sharon	3 votes + 1	58 votes
Hans Meenhorst; 2 votes		Dirk		Geert D		Prince	Geert D	Kyra	Sarah	HiuKwan	Sharon	3 votes + 1	16 votes
HiuKwan Chung; 5 votes	Hicham		Claudia		Wim	Geert D	Geert D	Kyra	Sharon	Geert T	Hans	Hans	
Sharon Berndsen; 7 votes		Dirk		Hannie		Prince	Geert T	Sarah	Sarah	Geert T	Hans	Yin	
Geert Van Tornhaut; 5 votes	Marleen		Hicham		Wim	Geert D	Geert D	Kyra	Sharon	Sharon		Hans	
Sarah De Graeve; 5 votes	Marleen		Hicham		Wim	Geert D	Geert D	Sharon	Sharon			Yin	
Kyra Van Oostveldt; 4 votes		Dirk		Hannie		Prince	Geert T	Sarah				Hans	
Geert De Deyn; 12 votes		Hannie		Hannie		Prince	Geert T					Yin	
Prince Heyliger; 5 votes	HiuKwan		Claudia		Wim	Geert D							
Wim Geens; 5 votes	Marleen		Claudia		HiuKwan								
Hannie Derks; 4 votes		Dirk		Geert D									
Hicham Maachi; 4 votes	HiuKwan		Claudia										
Mano Dijkman; 1 votes		Dirk											
Claudia Slok Soede; 5 votes	Claudia		Hicham										
Dirk Van Hoeydonck; 6 votes		Mano											
Marleen Haveman; 3 votes	Wim												

- Both two finalists, won an extra positive vote, for at the final council, during the expedition.
- At the final council, the eliminated contestants had to choose their winner, the votes are positive.
- At the live finale, 81 contestants from previous seasons had to choose their winner, due to the equal voting by the eliminated contestants.
