= Expeditie Robinson 2004 =

- Season 5
- Presented by: Ernst-Paul Hasselbach
- No. of days: 46
- No. of castaways: 18
- Winner: Frank Meulder
- Runner-up: Matthias Verscheure
- Location: Seribuat, Johor, Malaysia
- No. of episodes: 13

Release
- Original network: RTL 5; 2BE
- Original release: September 5 – November 28, 2004

Season chronology
- ← Previous; 2003 Next → 2005

Expeditie Robinson: 2004 is the fifth Dutch/Belgian version of the Swedish show Expedition Robinson, or Survivor, as it is referred to in some countries. This season began airing on 5 September 2004 and concluded on 28 November 2004.

== Season summary ==
The major twist this season was that the team tribes were divided up by participants country of origin with one tribe, België (Belgium), being composed of contestants from Belgium and one tribe, Nederlands (Netherlands), being composed of contestants from the Netherlands. Another major twist this season came to light in the first episode, when after an initial elimination challenge the two eliminated contestants, Ernestine Schweig and Sarah Bleecker, were told that instead of being eliminated they were going to live in an area known as the "Mangrove". From then on, any contestant that either lost a challenge or voted out were sent to the Mangrove. Throughout the competition many contestants living in the Mangrove were given opportunities to re-enter the game, however it was not until the ninth episode, when the contestants living in the Mangrove won a challenge against the merge tribe, known as Teluk, in order to re-enter the game.

Another twist that occurred this season was that of a tribal swap which took place in the fourth episode. Following the Mangrove contestants return to the game, a power struggle ensued between the Belgian and Dutch contestants. Ultimately, it was Belgian contestant Frank Meulder who won the season over fellow Belgian Matthias Verscheure with an overwhelming majority jury vote of 10-2. Like the previous season, the public was asked to vote in case of a tie. The public, like most of the jury, voted in favor of Frank.

== Finishing order ==
Contestant	Original Tribe	Mixed Tribe	Merged Tribe	Finish
Ernestine Schweig; Returned to game	Nederlands			Lost Challenge; Day 1
Sarah Bleecker; 24, Deinze, Belgium	België			Lost Challenge; Day 1 Left Mangrove; Day 2
Klaar Lippe; Returned to game	Nederlands			1st Voted Out; Day 3
Henk Dam; 59, Hurdegaryp, Netherlands	Nederlands			Ejected; Day 4
Mick Poelvoorde; Returned to game	België			3rd Voted Out; Day 9
Patrick Bierens; 35, Horst, Limburg	Nederlands	België		Evacuated; Day 10
Jeroen Hoef; 26, Groningen, Netherlands	Nederlands	Nederlands		Left Competition; Day 11
Shandinella Cornelia; Returned to game	Nederlands	Nederlands		Lost Challenge; Day 12
Mitchell Mehtouchi; Returned to game	België	België	Teluk	6th Voted Out; Day 18
Ernestine Schweig; 44, Nieuw-Vennep, Netherlands	Nederlands		Teluk	Left Mangrove; 1st Jury Member; Day 19
Mitchell Mehtouchi; 33, Boom, Belgium	België	België	Teluk	Left Mangrove; 2nd Jury Member; Day 20
Frouke Fraeyenhove; 22, The Hague, Netherlands	Nederlands	Nederlands	Teluk	7th Voted Out; 3rd Jury Member; Day 21
Kelly Eulaers; 22, Borgerhout, Belgium	België	Nederlands	Teluk	Left Competition; 4th Jury Member; Day 22
Darline Degheldere; Returned to game	België	België	Teluk	Lost Challenge; Day 23
Ronald Groenink; Returned to game	Nederlands	Nederlands	Teluk	8th Voted Out; Day 24
Mohamed Bouziane; 29, Turnhout, Belgium	België	Nederlands	Teluk	Left Competition; 5th Jury Member; Day 25
Peter Groote; 33, Ypres, Belgium	België	België	Teluk	Left Competition; 6th Jury Member; Day 26
Darline Degheldere; 41, Zwijndrecht, Belgium	België	België	Teluk	9th Voted Out; 7th Jury Member; Day 27
Mick Poelvaarde; 38, Schepdaal, Belgium	België		Teluk	10th Voted Out; 8th Jury Member; Day 30
Klaar Lippe; 42, Rotterdam, Netherlands	Nederlands		Teluk	11th Voted Out; 9th Jury Member; Day 33
Ronald Groenink; 43, Lelystad, Netherlands	Nederlands	Nederlands	Teluk	12th Voted Out; 10th Jury Member; Day 36
Shandinella Cornelia; 43, Lelystad, Netherlands	Nederlands	Nederlands	Teluk	Lost Challenge; 11th Jury Member; Day 37
Marjolein Cuijpers; 27, Amsterdam, Netherlands	Nederlands	België	Teluk	Lost Challenge; 12th Jury Member; Day 38
Matthias Verscheure; 23, Ostend, Belgium	België	België	Teluk	Runner-Up; Day 39
Frank Meulder; 37, Schilde, Belgium	België	België	Teluk	Sole Survivor; Day 39

== Future appearances ==
Ernestine Schweig, Mick Poelvaarde and Frank Meulder returned to compete in Expeditie Robinson: Battle of the Titans.

== Voting history ==
	Original Tribes					Mixed Tribes				Merged Tribe													
Episode #:	1	2		3		4		5		6	7		8		9		10	11	12	13		Reunion	
Eliminated:	Klaar; 5/8 votes	Henk; No vote	~~Frouke~~; 4/6 votes^{1}	Sarah; No vote	Mick; 7/8 votes	Patrick; No vote	~~Jeroen~~; 3/7 votes^{1},^{2}	Jeroen; No vote	~~Mitchell~~; 4/6 votes^{3}	Mitchell; 7/11 votes^{3}	Ernestine, Mitchell; No vote	Frouke; 5/9 votes	Kelly; No vote	Ronald; 4/6 votes	Mohamed, Peter; No vote	Darline; 4/8 votes^{4}	Mick; 4/8 votes	Klaar; 5/6 votes	Ronald; 3/5 votes	Shandinella; No vote	Marjolein; No vote	Matthias; 2/13 votes^{5}	Frank; 11/13 votes^{5}
Voter	Vote																						
Frank					Mick				Mitchell	Darline		Frouke		Ronald		Klaar	Mick	Klaar	Ronald			Jury Vote	
Matthias					Mick				Mitchell	Mitchell		Frouke		Ronald		Klaar	Mick	Klaar	Ronald			Jury Vote	
Marjolein	Klaar		Patrick						Mitchell	Mitchell		Frouke		Mohamed		Klaar	Mick; Mick	Klaar	Ronald			Matthias	
Shandinella	Klaar		Frouke				Mohamed			In Mangrove						Darline	Matthias	Klaar	Marjolein				Frank
Ronald	Klaar		Frouke				Mohamed			Kelly		Frouke		Peter	In Mangrove	Darline	Klaar	Klaar	Marjolein			Matthias	
Klaar	Patrick	In Mangrove														Darline	Ronald	Frank					Frank
Mick					Darline	In Mangrove										Darline	Klaar						Frank
Darline					Mick				Marjolein	Kelly		Fouke	In Mangrove			Klaar							Frank
Mohamed					Mick		Jeroen			Mitchell		Ronald		Ronald									Frank
Peter					Mick				Mitchell	Mitchell		Marjolein		Ronald									Frank
Kelly					Mick		Jeroen			Mitchell		Ronald											Frank
Frouke	Henk		Patrick				Jeroen			Mitchell		Matthias											Frank
Ernestine	In Mangrove																						Frank
Mitchell					Mick				Peter	Kelly	In Mangrove												Frank
Jeroen	Klaar		Frouke				Frouke																
Patrick	Klaar		Frouke																				
Sarah	In Mangrove																						
Henk	Frouke																						

^1 Due to Henk's ejection in episode 2, no one was eliminated following the vote at tribal council. However, as Frouke received the most votes she was given a penalty vote at the next tribal council.

^2 Due to Patrick's voluntary exit in episode 4, no one was eliminated following the vote at tribal council. However, as Jeroen received the most votes he would have been given a penalty vote at the next tribal council.

^3 Due to Jeroen's voluntary exit in episode 5, no one was eliminated following the vote at tribal council. However, as Mitchell received the most votes he was given a penalty vote at the next tribal council.

^4 At the ninth tribal council both Darline and Klaar received four votes. Because of this, the two were forced to draw lots to determine who would be eliminated.

^5 Like in previous years, the public was allowed to give one jury vote through the results of a poll. The public voted for Frank.
