= Expeditie Robinson 2000 =

- Season 1
- Presented by: Ernst-Paul Hasselbach
- No. of days: 47
- No. of castaways: 16
- Winner: Karin Lindenhovius
- Runner-up: Eva Willems
- Location: Seribuat, Johor, Malaysia
- No. of episodes: 13

Release
- Original network: RTL 5 VT4
- Original release: September 15 – December 18, 2000

Additional information
- Filming dates: June – July 2000

Season chronology
- Next → 2001

Expeditie Robinson: 2000 is the first season of the Dutch/Belgian version of the Swedish show Expedition Robinson, or Survivor as it is referred to in some countries. The season began airing on September 15, 2000, and concluded on December 18, 2000. It marked the first pan-regional version of the format to be broadcast.

Following the traditions seen in the original Swedish format, the two teams for this season were named the North Team (Noord) and the South Team (Zuid). Ultimately, Karin Lindenhovius from the Netherlands won the season over Eva Willems from Belgium in a jury vote of 5-3.

== Finishing order ==
Contestant	Original Tribe	Merged Tribe	Finish
Nele Degroote; 21, Roeselare, Belgium	North Team		1st Voted Out; Day 3
Dennis van de Boer; 23, Breda, Netherlands	North Team		2nd Voted Out; Day 7
Carine Spruyt; 41, Turnhout, Belgium	South Team		3rd Voted Out; Day 11
Harry Van Heuckelom; 43, Brussels, Belgium	North Team		4th Voted Out; Day 15
Ron Noorlander; 40, Rotterdam, Netherlands	South Team		5th Voted Out; Day 19
Lisa Portengen; 28, Amsterdam, Netherlands	North Team		6th Voted Out; Day 23
Jan Dewaegheneire; 43, Villers-Semeuse, France	North Team	Robinson	7th Voted Out; 1st Jury Member; Day 27
Kris Zientala; 40, Koersel, Belgium	South Team	Robinson	8th Voted Out; 2nd Jury Member; Day 30
Muriëlle Hurk; 27, Eindhoven, Netherlands	South Team	Robinson	9th Voted Out; 3rd Jury Member; Day 34
Sander Herbers; 28, Bedum, Netherlands	North Team	Robinson	10th Voted Out; 4th Jury Member; Day 37
Veronique Pryker; 32, Sint-Niklaas, Belgium	South Team	Robinson	11th Voted Out; 5th Jury Member; Day 41
Tommy Vuylsteke; 20, Waregem, Belgium	South Team	Robinson	12th Voted Out; 6th Jury Member; Day 44
Melvin Pigot; 30, Groningen, Netherlands	South Team	Robinson	Lost Challenge; 7th Jury Member; Day 46
Sascha Carrilho; 19, Amsterdam, Netherlands	South Team	Robinson	Lost Challenge; 8th Jury Member; Day 46
Eva Willems; 24, Brasschaat, Belgium	North Team	Robinson	Runner-Up; Day 47
Karin Lindenhovius; 25, Doetinchem, Netherlands	North Team	Robinson	Sole Survivor; Day 47

== Future appearances ==
Veronique Pryker, Melvin Pigot and Karin Lindenhovius returned to compete in Expeditie Robinson: Battle of the Titans.

== Voting history ==
	Original Tribes						Merged Tribe								
Episode #:	1	2	3	4	5	6	7	8	9	10	11	12	13	Reunion	
Eliminated:	Nele; 5/8 votes	Dennis; 5/7 votes	Carine; 4/8 votes	Harry; 5/6 votes	Ron; 3/7 votes	Lisa; 3/5 votes	Jan; 5/10 votes	Kris; 5/9 vote	Muriëlle; 4/8 votes	Sander; 4/7 votes	Veronique; 3/7 votes^{1}	Tommy; 3/5 votes	Sascha; Melvin; No vote	Eva; 3/8 votes	Karin; 5/8 votes
Voter	Vote														
Karin	Nele	Dennis		Harry		Lisa	Jan	Kris	Muriëlle	Sander	Tommy	Tommy		Jury Vote	
Eva	Nele	Dennis		Harry		Sander	Jan	Kris	Muriëlle	Sander	Tommy	Tommy		Jury Vote	
Melvin			Carine		Sascha		Jan	Kris	Muriëlle	Sander	Sascha	Tommy		Eva	
Sascha			Veronique		Ron		Veronique	Eva	Veronique	Veronique	Veronique; Veronique	Eva			Karin
Tommy			Veronique		Veronique		Jan	Kris	Melvin	Veronique	Veronique	Eva		Eva	
Veronique			Carine		Tommy		Tommy	Kris	Muriëlle	Sander	Sascha				Karin
Sander	Nele	Eva		Harry		Lisa	Jan	Eva	Veronique	Veronique					Karin
Muriëlle			Veronique		Ron		Veronique	Eva	Veronique						Karin
Kris			Carine		Ron		Veronique	Eva							Karin
Jan	Lisa	Dennis		Harry		Lisa	Veronique							Eva	
Lisa	Jan	Dennis		Harry		Jan									
Ron			Carine		Muriëlle										
Harry	Nele	Dennis		Jan											
Carine			Kris												
Dennis	Nele	Karin													
Nele	Dennis														

^1 In episode eleven, Sascha won a reward challenge and as part of her reward she was granted a second vote at the eleventh tribal council.
