= Expeditie Robinson 2001 =

Dutch/Belgian version of Expedition Robinson/Survivor

- Season 2
- Presented by: Ernst-Paul Hasselbach
- No. of days: 47
- No. of castaways: 16
- Winner: Richard Mackowiak
- Runner-up: Pascale Mertens
- Location: Seribuat, Johor, Malaysia
- No. of episodes: 13

Release
- Original network: RTL 5 VT4
- Original release: September 22 – December 25, 2001

Season chronology
- ← Previous; 2000 Next → 2002

Expeditie Robinson: 2001 is the second season of the Dutch/Belgian version of the Swedish show Expedition Robinson, or Survivor as it is referred to in some countries. The series began on September 22, 2001, and concluded on December 25, 2001.

== Season summary ==
The two original tribes were Simbang, also referred to as the North Team, and Lima, also referred to as the South Team. A major twist in the series occurred in episode 5, when Eric Buissink, Gwann Elzen and Koenraad Schwagten competed in a challenge to determine who would return to the game in place of Hilde Jacobs, who quit in episode two. Koenraad won and joined the Simbang tribe.

Ultimately, Richard Mackowiak from Belgium won the series over Pascale Mertens, also from Belgium, in a jury vote of 7-0 to become the Sole Survivor.

== Finishing order ==
Contestant	Original tribe	Episode 5 tribe	Merged tribe	Finish
Lobke Peers; 21, Zoersel, Belgium	Lima			1st voted out Day 4
Hilde Jacobs; 36, Deurne, Belgium	Simbang			Quit; Day 6
Eric Buissink; 62, Heemserveen, Netherlands	Simbang			2nd voted out Day 7
Koenraad Schwagten; Returned to game	Lima			3rd voted out Day 11
Gwann Elzen; 31, Veldhoven, Netherlands	Simbang			4th voted out Day 15
Jan Hoof; 25, Ekeren, Belgium	Simbang	Simbang		5th voted out Day 19
Jasha Wel; 23, Amsterdam, Netherlands	Lima	Lima		Quit; Day 21
Christine Colaris; 36, Susteren, Netherlands	Lima	Lima		6th voted out Day 22
Martijn Diender; 24, Groningen, Netherlands	Lima	Lima	Periuk	7th voted out 1st jury member Day 26
Nathalie Nisen; 37, Destelbergen, Belgium	Lima	Lima	Periuk	8th voted out 2nd jury member Day 29
Gerrit Berghe; 37, Aalter, Belgium	Lima	Lima	Periuk	9th voted out 3rd jury member Day 33
Jennifer Smit; 42, Waalre, Netherlands	Simbang	Simbang	Periuk	Evacuated; 4th jury member Day 34
Koenraad Schwagten; 44, Lier, Belgium	Lima	Simbang	Periuk	12th voted out 5th jury member Day 41
Melanie Drent; 21, Nijmegen, Netherlands	Simbang	Simbang	Periuk	13th voted out 6th jury member Day 44
Pieter d'Hane; 35, Rotterdam, Netherlands	Lima	Lima	Periuk	Lost Challenge; 7th jury member Day 46
Pascale Mertens; 28, Arendonk, Belgium	Simbang	Simbang	Periuk	Runner-up; Day 47
Richard Mackowiak; 44, Bilzen, Belgium	Simbang	Simbang	Periuk	Sole Survivor; Day 47

== Future appearances ==
Jennifer Smit, Pieter d'Hane and Richard Mackowiak returned to compete in Expeditie Robinson: Battle of the Titans.

== Voting history ==
	Original tribes					Episode 5-6 tribes			Merged tribe									
Episode #:	1	2		3	4	5	6		7	8	9	10		11	12	13	Reunion	
Eliminated:	Lobke; 4/8 votes^{1}	Hilde; No vote	Eric; 6/7 votes	Koenraad; 5/7 votes	Gwann; 3/6 votes	Jan; 3/5 votes^{2}	Jasha; No vote	Christine; 3/5 vote	Martijn; 6/9 votes	Nathalie; 6/8 votes	Gerrit; 4/7 votes	Jennifer; No vote	~~Koenraad~~; 2/5 votes^{3}	Koenraad; 5/6 votes^{4}	Melanie; 2/4 votes^{5}	Pieter; No vote	Pascale; 0/7 votes	Richard; 7/7 votes
Voter	Vote																	
Richard			Eric		Gwann	Jan			Martijn	Nathalie	Gerrit		Koenraad	Koenraad	Melanie		Jury vote	
Pascale			Eric		Melanie	Jan			Martijn	Nathalie	Gerrit		Koenraad	Koenraad	Melanie		Jury vote	
Pieter	Lobke			Koenraad				Christine	Koenraad	Nathalie	Richard		Melanie	Koenraad	Richard			Richard
Melanie			Eric		Gwann	Pascale			Martijn	Nathalie	Richard		Richard	Koenraad	Richard			Richard
Koenraad	Lobke			Jasha	Returns				Martijn	Nathalie	Gerrit		Pieter	Pascale				Richard
Jennifer			Eric		Jan	Jan			Martijn	Nathalie	Gerrit							Richard
Gerrit	Koenraad			Koenraad				Christine	Pieter	Pieter	Jennifer							Richard
Nathalie	Lobke			Koenraad				Christine	Martijn	Pieter								Richard
Martijn	Lobke			Jasha				Nathalie	Koenraad									Richard
Christine	Koenraad			Koenraad				Nathalie										
Jasha	Koenraad			Koenraad														
Jan			Eric		Gwann	Pascale												
Gwann			Eric		Melanie													
Eric			Gwann															
Hilde																		
Lobke	Koenraad																	

^1 At the first tribal council, both Koenraad and Lobke received two votes each. Because of this, both had to take part in a lot drawing in order to determine who would be eliminated

^2 At the fifth tribal council, Koenraad had immunity as he was new to the Simbang tribe.

^3 As Jennifer left the competition in episode 10, it was decided that following the vote at the tenth tribal council no one would be eliminated.

^4 Due to his rule breaking in episode 11, Koenraad was given a penalty vote at the eleventh tribal council.

^5 At the twelfth tribal council, both Melanie and Richard received two votes each.

Because of this, both had to take part in a lot drawing in order to determine who would be eliminated.
