= Expeditie Robinson 2003 =

- Season 4
- Presented by: Ernst-Paul Hasselbach
- No. of days: 47
- No. of castaways: 16
- Winner: Jutta Borms
- Runner-up: Judge Chambliss
- Location: Kelepa, Indonesia
- No. of episodes: 13

Release
- Original network: RTL 5 VT4
- Original release: September 13 – December 6, 2003

Season chronology
- ← Previous; 2002 Next → 2004

Expeditie Robinson: 2003 is the fourth season of the Dutch/Belgian version of the reality television series Expeditie Robinson, or Survivor as it is referred to in some countries. This season began airing on September 13, 2003 and concluded on December 6, 2003.

== Season summary ==
The major twist this season was that the team tribes were divided mostly by gender, with the Timo tribe (South Team) initially comprising seven men and one woman, while the Pantai tribe (North Team) comprising seven women and one man. As the only member of their gender on their respective tribes, Björn Lemeire and Fatima Aboulouafa were made leaders of their tribes and given immunity at their tribe's first respective Tribal Council.

A shocking discovery was made in episode 4 when Fatima was forced to leave the competition as it had been discovered that she was four months pregnant. In the same episode, a tribe swap occurred, in which Giovani Oosters and Judge Chambliss switched tribes with Jutta Borms and Karen Vanautgaerden. Another twist occurred in episode 7 when, following the merge and Karen's subsequent elimination, she was told that instead of being eliminated, she would compete in duels at "Devils Island" with the next contestant to be voted out. The loser of each duel would be eliminated, and the winner of the final duel would re-enter the game at the final three. In another format change, the final five contestants in the merged tribe competed in a challenge, eliminating the two losers. A second challenge occurred at the final three. The winner of the final duel on Devil's Island, Ilona van der Laan, would go on to lose the final challenge.

Ultimately, it was Jutta Borms from Belgium who won the season over Judge Chambliss from the Netherlands to become the Sole Survivor. The jury vote resulted in a 4-4 tie, which was eventually broken by a public jury vote in which the public voted in favor of making Jutta the winner, with 66% of the vote.

== Finishing order ==
Contestant	Original Tribe	Episode 4 Tribe	Merged Tribe	Finish
Simon Monbaliu; 19, Ghent, Belgium	Timo			1st Voted Out; Day 4
Marlieke Muilwijk; 19, Sassenheim, Netherlands	Pantai			2nd Voted Out; Day 8
Esther Poel; 33, Amsterdam, Netherlands	Pantai			3rd Voted Out; Day 12
Fatima Aboulouafa; 33, Heerlen, Netherlands	Timo	Timo		Evacuated; Day 16
Eva Willems; 25, Brasschaat, Belgium	Pantai	Pantai		4th Voted Out; Day 20
Eric Sloten; 43, Groningen, Netherlands	Timo	Timo		Quit; Day 21
Karen Vanautgaerden; 28, Leuven, Belgium	Pantai	Timo	Kelapa	6th Voted Out; 1st Jury Member; Day 27; Lost Duel; Day 31
Geert Van Speybroek; 39, Bohan sur Semois, Belgium	Timo	Timo	Kelapa	7th Voted Out; 2nd Jury Member; Day 30; Lost Duel; Day 35
Björn Lemeire; 34, Gistel, Belgium	Pantai	Pantai	Kelapa	8th Voted Out; 3rd Jury Member; Day 34; Lost Duel; Day 39
Ryan van Esch; 37, Uden, Netherlands	Timo	Timo	Kelapa	9th Voted Out; 4th Jury Member; Day 38; Lost Duel; Day 46
Franca-Maria Reichmann; 41, Amsterdam, Netherlands	Pantai	Pantai	Kelapa	10th Voted Out; 5th Jury Member; Day 41; Lost Duel; Day 42
Ilona van der Laan; Returned to game	Pantai	Pantai	Kelapa	11th Voted Out; Day 45; Won Duel; Day 46
Robin Ibens; 28, Leuven, Belgium	Timo	Timo	Kelapa	Lost Challenge; 6th Jury Member; Day 46
Giovani Oosters; 27, Hasselt, Belgium	Timo	Pantai	Kelapa	Lost Challenge; 7th Jury Member; Day 46
Ilona van der Laan; 22, Bloemendaal, Netherlands	Pantai	Pantai	Kelapa	Lost Challenge; 8th Jury Member; Day 47
Judge Chambliss; 30, Amsterdam, Netherlands	Timo	Pantai	Kelapa	Runner-Up; Day 49
Jutta Borms; 30, Waasmunster, Belgium	Pantai	Timo	Kelapa	Sole Survivor; Day 49

== Future Appearances ==
Björn Lemeire, Ryan van Esch and Ilona van der Laan returned to compete in Expeditie Robinson: Battle of the Titans which van Esch won.

== Voting history ==
	Original Tribes			Mixed Tribes					Merged Tribe									
Episode #:	1	2	3	4		5	6		7	8	9	10	11	12	13		Reunion	
Eliminated:	Simon; 5/8 votes	Marlieke; 6/8 votes	Esther; 2/7 votes	Fatima; No vote^{1}	~~Eric~~; 4/6 votes^{1}	Eva; 3/6 votes^{2}	Eric; No vote^{3}	~~Robin~~; 2/5 votes^{3}	Karen; 6/11 votes^{3}	Geert; 7/9 vote	Björn; 4/8 votes^{4}	Ryan; 4/7 votes	Franca-Maria; 4/7 votes^{5}	Ilona; 3/5 votes	Robin; Giovani; No vote	Ilona; No vote	Judge; 4/9 votes^{6}	Jutta; 5/9 votes^{6}
Voter	Vote																	
Jutta		Marlieke	Eva		Eric			Karen	Karen	Geert	Björn	Judge	Judge	Judge			Jury Vote	
Judge	Simon					Eva			Karen	Geert	Ryan	Ryan	Franca-Maria	Ilona			Jury Vote	
Ilona		Marlieke	Franca-Maria			Judge			Björn	Björn	Björn	Judge	Judge	Judge	In Devils Island		Judge	
Giovani	Simon					Eva			Karen	Geert	Ryan	Ryan	Franca-Maria	Ilona			Judge	
Robin	Simon				Eric			Ryan	Jutta	Geert	Ryan	Ryan	Franca-Maria; Franca-Maria	Ilona			Judge	
Franca-Maria		Marlieke	Jutta			Judge			Björn	Geert	Björn	Ryan	Judge					Jutta
Ryan	Simon				Eric			Robin	Karen	Geert	Björn	Judge						Jutta
Björn		Esther	Esther			Eva			Karen	Geert	Ryan							Jutta
Geert	Ryan				Ryan			Robin	Karen	Judge								Jutta
Karin		Marlieke	Esther		Eric			Jutta	Björn								Judge	
Eric	Ryan				Jutta													
Eva		Marlieke	Ilona			Judge												
Fatima	Simon																	
Esther		Marlieke	Karen															
Marlieke		Jutta																
Simon	Ryan																	

^1 Due to Fatima's evacuation in episode 4, no one was eliminated at the fourth tribal council. However, as Eric received the most votes at tribal council he was given a penalty vote at his tribes next tribal council.

^2 At the fifth tribal council both Eva and Judge received three votes. As the leader of the tribe, Björn was asked to cast the deciding vote.

^3 Due to Eric's voluntary exit in episode 6, no one was eliminated at the sixth tribal council. However, as Robin received the most votes at tribal council he was given a penalty vote at the next tribal council.

^4 At the ninth tribal council both Björn and Ryan received four votes. Because Björn had received more votes since the merge he was eliminated.

^5 In episode 11, the contestants competed in a reward challenge in which the winner would be allowed a second vote to cast at tribal council. Robin won the challenge.

^6 As there was initially a tie at the final tribal council, the public was given the right to cast the deciding vote through the results of a poll.
