= Expeditie Robinson 2011 =

- Season 13
- No. of episodes: 14

Release
- Original network: 2BE; RTL 5
- Original release: September 1, 2011

Season chronology
- ← Previous; 2010 Next → 2012

Expeditie Robinson 2011 is the thirteenth season of the RTL 5 and 2BE reality television series Expeditie Robinson first aired on September 1, 2011. It was the third season hosted by Evi Hanssen and Eddy Zoëy.

This season also includes celebrities only, similar to Expeditie Robinson 2010.

== Survivors ==
Contestants	Episodes														Finish	Total votes
Contestants	01	02	03	04	05	06	07	08	09	10	11	12	13	14	Finish	Total votes
Tanja Dexters; 34, Miss Belgium 1998 from Belgium															Winner	5^{1}
Niko Van Driessche; 28, TV host from Belgium															Runner-Up	2
Sascha Visser; 23, actor and TV host from the Netherlands															Runner-Up	5
Patrick Martens; 33, actor and TV host from the Netherlands															Eliminated; 4th	3
Jochem Uytdehaage; 35, long track speed skater from the Netherlands															Voted Out 5th 5th	12^{2}
Esther Schouten; 33, boxer from the Netherlands															Voted Out 4th 6th	5
Lauretta Gerards; 24, actor from the Netherlands															Voted Out 3rd 7th	5^{3}
Anne De Baetzelier; 47, TV host from Belgium															Voted Out 2nd 8th	13^{4}
Nicolas Liébart; 31, television celebrity from Belgium															Voted Out 1st 9th	5
Kobe Van Herwegen; 27, actor, illusionist and TV host from Belgium															Eliminated; 10th	3
Deborah Ostrega; 38, actor, singer and TV host from Belgium															Quit voluntarily 11th	3^{5}
Dominique "Do" van Hulst; 30, singer from the Netherlands															Quit voluntarily 12th	7
Sylvia Geersen; 26, fashion model from the Netherlands															Quit voluntarily 13th	6
Freddy De Kerpel; 63, boxer from Belgium															Quit voluntarily^{6} 14th	7
Katerine Avgoustakis; 28, singer from Belgium															Quit voluntarily 15th	4
Sipke Jan Bousema; 35, TV host from the Netherlands															Left due to injury 16th	4^{7}

Kamp Noord
Kamp Zuid
Visserseiland
Winnaarseiland
Afvallersgrot

Notes

- ^1 Originally, Tanja received one black vote at the twelfth council but undid the vote by one immunity coin.
- ^2 Originally, Jochem received three votes at the fifth council and four votes at the twelfth council but undid two votes by two immunity coins.
- ^3 Originally, Lauretta received one vote at the first council and two votes at the extra third council but undid the votes by three immunity coins.
- ^4 Originally, Anne received eight votes at the tenth council but undid one vote by one immunity coin.
- ^5 Originally, Deborah received three votes at the fifth council but undid one vote by one immunity coin.
- ^6 Freddy voluntarily quit, before going to the Afvallersgrot, at the third council, where he was voted off. Due to his decision an extra council was introduced in Episode 3.
- ^7 Originally, Sipke Jan received six votes at the first council, but undid two votes by two immunity coins.

== Future appearances ==
Dominique "Do" van Hulst returned to compete in Expeditie Robinson 2021.
