= Expeditie Robinson 2002 =

- Season 3
- Presented by: Ernst-Paul Hasselbach
- No. of days: 47
- No. of castaways: 16
- Winner: Derek Blok
- Runner-up: Olivier Glorieux
- Location: Mensirip Island, Johor, Malaysia
- No. of episodes: 12

Release
- Original network: RTL 5 VT4
- Original release: September 15 – December 18, 2002

Season chronology
- ← Previous; 2001 Next → 2003

Expeditie Robinson: 2002 is the third season of the Dutch/Belgian version of the Swedish show Expedition Robinson, or Survivor as it is referred to in some countries. This season began airing on September 15, 2002, and concluded on December 18, 2002.

A major twist this season was that the team tribes were initially divided by gender, with the Mensirip tribe initially comprising only men, while the Uma tribe initially comprising only women. A second twist occurred in episode 3, when the series' first tribe swap occurred.

Ultimately, Derek Blok from the Netherlands won the season over Olivier Glorieux from Belgium in a jury vote of 5-4 to become the Sole Survivor.

== Finishing order ==
Contestant	Original Tribe	Episode 3 Tribe	Merged Tribe	Finish
Danny Giles; 19, Amsterdam, Netherlands	Mensirip			1st Voted Out; Day 4
Meintje Brand; 30, Uden, Netherlands	Uma			2nd Voted Out; Day 8
Annelies Marten; 24, Sint-Niklaas, Belgium	Uma	Mensirip		3rd Voted Out; Day 12
Walter DeSmedt; 36, Wilrijk, Belgium	Mensirip	Uma		4th Voted Out; Day 16
Raymond Grave; 42, Son en Breugel, Netherlands	Mensirip	Uma		Quit; Day 20
Keo Freysen; 24, Borsbeek, Belgium	Mensirip	Mensirip	Robinson	Evacuated; 1st Jury Member; Day 24
Nolleke Bekkering; 46, Amsterdam, Netherlands	Uma	Uma	Robinson	6th Voted Out; 2nd Jury Member; Day 28
Mark Meester; 32, Nieuw-Vennep, Netherlands	Mensirip	Uma	Robinson	7th Voted Out; 3rd Jury Member; Day 32
Jakobien Huisman; 31, Antwerp, Belgium	Uma	Uma	Robinson	8th Voted Out; 4th Jury Member; Day 36
Lydia Guiso; 19, Opglabbeek, Belgium	Uma	Uma	Robinson	9th Voted Out; 5th Jury Member; Day 40
Deborah Hattem; 23, Utrecht, Netherlands	Uma	Uma	Robinson	10th Voted Out; 6th Jury Member; Day 40
Luc Smeets; 40, Neerpelt, Belgium	Mensirip	Mensirip	Robinson	11th Voted Out; 7th Jury Member; Day 40
Loes Vincke; 34, Kortrijk, Belgium	Uma	Mensirip	Robinson	12th Voted Out; 8th Jury Member; Day 43
Kristina Arquin; 27, Antwerp, Belgium	Uma	Mensirip	Robinson	Lost Challenge; 9th Jury Member; Day 46
Olivier Glorieux; 28, Wemmel, Belgium	Mensirip	Mensirip	Robinson	Runner-Up; Day 47
Derek Blok; 41, Amsterdam, Netherlands	Mensirip	Mensirip	Robinson	Sole Survivor; Day 47

== Future Appearances ==
Jakobien Huisman and Lydia Guiso returned to compete in Expeditie Robinson: Battle of the Titans.

== Voting history ==
	Original Tribes		Mixed Tribes				Merged Tribe											
Episode #:	1	2	3	4	5		6		7	8	9	10			11	12	Reunion	
Eliminated:	Danny; 4/8 votes	Meintje; 3/8 votes	Annelies; 4/7 votes	Walter; 5/7 votes	Raymond; No vote	~~Mark~~; 4/5 votes^{1}	Keo; No vote	~~Nolleke~~; 6/10 votes^{2}	Nolleke; 6/10 votes	Mark; 8/9 votes	Jakobien; 6/8 votes	Lydia; 3/7 votes	Deborah; 5/6 votes	Luc; 3/5 votes	Loes; 3/4 votes	Kristina; No vote	Olivier; 4/9 votes	Derek; 5/9 votes
Voter	Vote																	
Derek	Mark		Annelies					Nolleke	Nolleke	Mark	Jakobien	Deborah	Deborah	Loes	Loes		Jury Vote	
Olivier	Danny		Annelies					Nolleke	Nolleke	Mark	Lydia	Lydia	Deborah	Luc	Loes		Jury Vote	
Kristina		Meintje	Olivier					Nolleke	Nolleke	Mark	Jakobien	Lydia	Deborah	Luc	Loes		Olivier	
Loes		Meintje	Derek					Nolleke	Nolleke	Mark	Jakobien	Deborah	Deborah	Luc	Kristina		Olivier	
Luc	Mark		Annelies					Nolleke	Nolleke	Mark	Jakobien	Lydia	Deborah	Loes			Olivier	
Deborah		Lydia		Walter		Mark		Mark	Mark	Mark	Jakobien	Luc	Loes					Derek
Lydia		Deborah		Walter		Mark		Mark	Mark	Mark	Jakobien	Luc						Derek
Jakobien		Kristina		Walter		Mark		Mark	Mark	Mark	Deborah						Olivier	
Mark	Danny			Nolleke		Deborah		Nolleke	Nolleke	Derek								Derek
Nolleke		Annelies		Walter		Mark		Mark	Mark									Derek
Keo	Danny		Annelies															Derek
Raymond	Danny			Walter														
Walter	Mark			Raymond														
Annelies		Meintje	Derek															
Meintje		Kristina																
Danny	Luc																	

^1 As Raymond voluntarily left the competition in episode 5, no one was eliminated at the fifth tribal council.

^2 As Keo was evacuated in episode 6, no one was eliminated at the sixth tribal council.
