= Kim Woodburn =

English television personality and expert cleaner (1942–2025)

- Woodburn in 2019
- Born: Patricia Mary McKenzie; 25 March 1942; Eastney, Hampshire, England
- Died: 16 June 2025 (aged 83); Cheshire, England
- Other name: Queen of Clean
- Occupations: Television personality; writer; cleaner
- Years active: 2003–2025
- Known for: How Clean is Your House? I'm a Celebrity...Get Me Out of Here! Celebrity Big Brother
- Spouses: Kenneth Davies (m. 1971; div. 1975) Peter Woodburn (m. 1979)

Patricia Mary "Kim" Woodburn (née McKenzie; 25 March 1942 – 16 June 2025) was an English television personality, writer, and expert cleaner. Known as the "Queen of Clean", she came to prominence by co-presenting the Channel 4 series How Clean Is Your House? (2003–2009) and its Canadian version, Kim's Rude Awakenings (2008–2009). Woodburn maintained a media career that spanned over two decades and went on to appear on various reality television shows, most notably I'm a Celebrity...Get Me Out of Here! (2009) and Celebrity Big Brother (2017).

== Early life ==
Patricia Mary McKenzie was born on 25 March 1942 in Eastney, Hampshire, to Mary Patricia (née Shaw) and Ronald McKenzie, a Royal Marine who was largely absent from her upbringing. Woodburn was physically abused by her parents throughout her childhood and sexually abused by her father. Her mother resented the fact that she resembled her father and would beat her with carpet brushes and other household objects. She had an older sister, Gloria, and several half siblings from her mother's second marriage to James McGinley.

She left home at the age of 16 and moved to Liverpool, where she worked as a live-in cleaner for a family. Alongside her work as a professional cleaner, Woodburn held other jobs, including as a beautician at a department store make-up counter and as a model after taking modelling classes. She also worked on the assembly line at the Meccano factory and held a job at Woolworths. In February 1966, at the age of 23, Woodburn prematurely gave birth to a stillborn son and buried him in a park. This revelation, made in her 2006 autobiography, Unbeaten, led to a police inquiry, but no action was taken, and Woodburn cooperated fully with the investigation. After the death of her baby, she changed her name from Patricia to Kim, after the American actress and painter Kim Novak, having seen her in a film. Woodburn spent a year at sea with Fred. Olsen Cruise Lines, working in ship gift shops, and later became a residential social worker in a girls' remand centre.

== Career ==
=== How Clean Is Your House? ===
In January 2003, Channel 4 contacted a cleaning company looking for "a really good cleaner with quite a funny temperament for a new series." The company recommended Woodburn, aged 60 at the time, who was working as a live-in cleaner for a family in Kent. After a screen test, programme makers paired her with Aggie MacKenzie and filming began three weeks later. How Clean Is Your House? aired for seven series between 2003 and 2009, with the duo producing books, board games and DVDs due to the popularity of the series. Woodburn was significantly taller than McKenzie, and her usual dress on the programme would be suit jackets, high heels and pearl necklaces, with her hair slicked back in a tight braided bun, the latter of which was described as her "trademark". Woodburn's "salty slang" and no-nonsense attitude gained her popularity with the show's viewers, and she was known for her use of natural household solutions such as baking soda, mayonnaise and white vinegar.

Woodburn appeared on The Oprah Winfrey Show in the US, where How Clean Is Your House? aired on BBC America. From 2008 to 2009, Woodburn starred in a Canadian version, titled Kim's Rude Awakenings, alongside Mike Chalut. Woodburn and MacKenzie's relationship became strained during later series, with MacKenzie saying that the pair "did not speak" off-camera during the last two series of the show, claiming that Woodburn had "pushed her" during a pantomime they were starring in. Woodburn however said that she had "never said anything derogatory about MacKenzie", further stating that she was "not going to start now", expressing her confusion about the alleged fall out with MacKenzie, stating that she was "unclear where these false allegations have come from but I wish her all the luck in the world". In August 2009, Woodburn announced to Now magazine that she would not be making any further series of How Clean Is Your House? and Channel 4 announced soon afterwards that the series had been cancelled.

=== Television appearances ===
In November 2009, Woodburn was announced as a contestant for the ninth series of I'm a Celebrity...Get Me Out of Here!. She finished as runner-up to Gino D'Acampo. In March 2010, she appeared on Celebrity Come Dine with Me on Channel 4 alongside Claire Sweeney, Darren Day and Tom O'Connor. In 2011, Woodburn became a regular panellist on the Big Brother spin-off series, Big Brother's Bit on the Side. In November 2011, she entered the house to set a shopping task which she also judged, while berating the housemates for their hygiene.

In February 2013, Woodburn teamed up with chef Rosemary Shrager, and the pair appeared on the fifth series of Let's Dance for Comic Relief as contestants. They danced to "Diamonds Are a Girl's Best Friend" by Marilyn Monroe. They were eliminated by the panel of judges. In 2014, Woodburn appeared as a contestant on an episode of The Chase Celebrity Specials.

In March 2016, Woodburn took part in the second series of Famous, Rich and Homeless for BBC One. Her controversial comments on the lives of rough sleepers and some of them that she met led to a dispute between her, the public and the other volunteers on the show. In April 2016, Woodburn and her husband, Pete, appeared on Channel 4's A Place in the Sun: Winter Sun in order to find a holiday home in Costa del Sol, which was to be their home during the winter months. Their budget was £320,000 and they were shown five two-three bedroom penthouses. They put offers forward of £285,000 and £295,000 on an apartment but both were turned down by the owner.

In January 2017, Woodburn entered the Celebrity Big Brother house to participate as a housemate in its nineteenth series, entering on Day 11. During her time in the house, Woodburn was involved in conflicts with several of her fellow housemates, one incident of which she referred to Jamie O'Hara as an "adulterer", ultimately requiring security to enter the house and intervene. She gained notoriety for her outbursts, several of which featured Woodburn referring to her housemates as "ganghanded" and "chicken-livered". She finished in third place on Day 32.

In August 2018, Woodburn made a controversial appearance on ITV's Loose Women. She was asked if she would make amends with Coleen Nolan (who she fell out with after they both appeared on Celebrity Big Brother), but left after a reception by the panel that was widely described as "bullying". The incident resulted in almost 8,000 people complaining to Ofcom. In 2021, Woodburn featured in a Christmas advert for Grainger Market Delivery, an online shopping company. In 2022, Woodburn made various guest appearances on GB News and was a contestant on the E4 cooking competition Celeb Cooking School, where she was eliminated first. Woodburn's final television appearance aired posthumously in September 2025, on an episode of the Channel 5 programme Supermarket Own Brands: The Big Taste Test. Filmed a year prior, it featured Woodburn and other consumers testing supermarkets' own brand products against more expensive branded products, and giving their opinions.

=== Other ventures ===
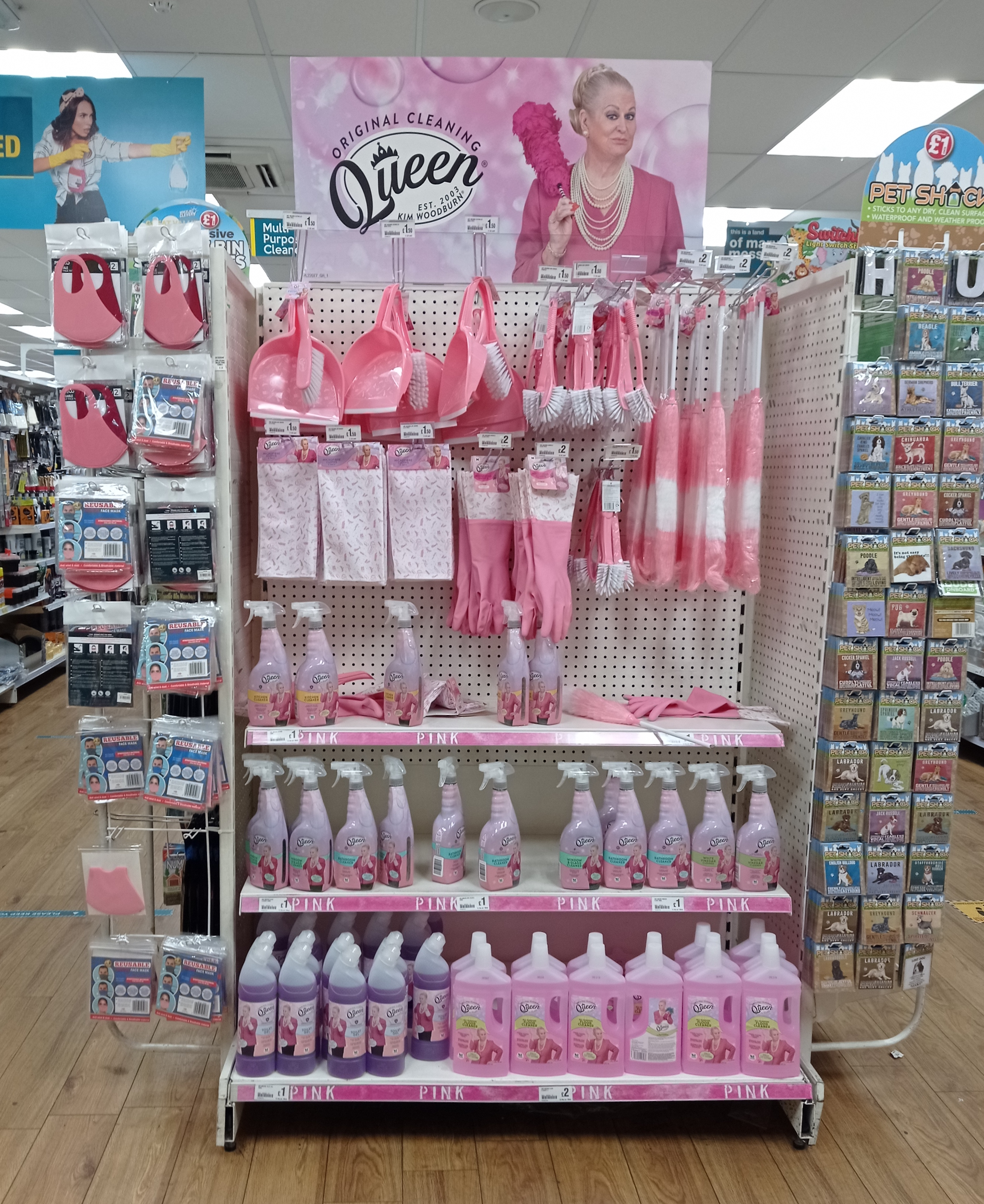
Woodburn's cleaning products at Poundland

In 2006, Woodburn wrote an autobiography, Unbeaten, which detailed her early life. She went on to appear in various pantomimes in theatres all over the UK. Her first pantomime performance was in the Cinderella as an Ugly Sister, alongside television co-star Aggie MacKenzie, at the Theatre Royal in Brighton. It ran from 7 December 2007 to 6 January 2008. From 15 December 2010 to 3 January 2011, she made her second appearance in pantomime in Cinderella at the Woodville Halls Theatre in Gravesend, where she played the Fairy Godmother.

From 11 to 26 December 2012, Woodburn played the Wicked Stepmother in Cinderella at the Grimsby Auditorium. She performed in pantomime for the fourth time at the Southport Theatre in Jack and the Beanstalk as Fairy Starlight. The season ran from 13 December 2013 to 31 December 2013. From 2014 to 2015, she played Fairy Liquid in Snow White and the Seven Dwarfs at The Brindley in Runcorn, followed by a 2018 appearance at the Epstein Theatre in Liverpool as the Wicked Queen in Snow White and the Seven Dwarfs. In 2022, Woodburn released a range of cleaning products at Poundland. In February 2025, in what transpired to be her final public appearance, Woodburn was interviewed by drag queen Belinda Scandal for a one-off "In Conversation With: Kim Woodburn" show at The Lowry, in which she spoke about her life and career.

== Personal life ==
Woodburn's first marriage, to police officer Kenneth Davies in 1971, ended in divorce in 1975 due to his violent behaviour and infidelity. In April 1975, while Woodburn was managing a fashion store that had been burgled, she met Peter Woodburn, the police officer attending the incident. They married in 1979 and, in 1984, moved to the United States, where they worked as housekeepers and housemen. They returned to the United Kingdom in 1995 and signed on with domestic-worker employment agencies. They lived together in Nantwich, Cheshire.

== Death ==
Woodburn died following a short illness on 16 June 2025, aged 83. Her death was announced the following day by her management, who described her as an "incredibly kind, caring, charismatic and strong person", adding that her husband was "heartbroken at the loss of his soulmate"."

Tributes to Woodburn were paid by her How Clean Is Your House? co-star Aggie MacKenzie, who described her as an "unforgettable woman", adding that "behind the fierce persona was deep pain and incredible strength. She survived because she had to." MacKenzie also said she "hoped [Woodburn] was resting now." Others paying tribute included Jedward, who appeared alongside Woodburn on Celebrity Big Brother and noted that she would be "truly missed for the television gold [she] created for all generations", as well as Baga Chipz who said Woodburn was "one of a kind" and a "national treasure". Woodburn was privately cremated and had no funeral service, as per her wishes. A further tribute to her was aired at the end of Supermarket Own Brands: The Big Taste Test, Woodburn's final television appearance, which was broadcast three months after her death.

== Filmography ==
As herself
| Year | Title | Notes | Ref |
|---|---|---|---|
| 2003–2009 | How Clean Is Your House? | Presenter | |
| 2004 | Too Posh to Wash | Presenter | |
| 2006 | When Kim & Aggie Went to Hospital | Presenter | |
| 2008–2009 | Kim's Rude Awakenings | Presenter | |
| 2009 | I'm a Celebrity...Get Me Out of Here! | Series 9; runner-up | |
| 2012 | Hotel GB | Housekeeping | |
| 2016 | Famous, Rich and Homeless | Participant | |
| 2017 | Celebrity Big Brother | Series 19; third place | |
| 2022 | Celeb Cooking School | Contestant | |

=== Guest appearances ===
- V Graham Norton (4 June 2003) – 1 episode
- This Morning (4 November 2003, 23 November 2004, 6 September 2006, 26 November 2010, 6 February 2017, 23 September 2017, 3 June 2018) – 7 episodes
- Richard & Judy (12 November 2003, 24 August 2006) – 2 episodes
- Children In Need 2003 (21 November 2003) – 1 episode
- The Terry and Gaby Show (24 November 2003) – 1 episode
- Hogmanay Live (31 December 2003) – 1 episode
- National Television Awards Party of the Year (3 January 2004) – 1 episode
- Hell's Kitchen (4 June 2004, 27 April 2009) – 3 episodes
- Friday Night with Jonathan Ross (17 September 2004) – 1 episode
- EastEnders: Christmas Party (23 December 2004) – 1 episode
- Today with Des and Mel (24 February 2005) – 1 episode
- Dirty Tricks (7 October 2005) – 1 episode
- The Paul O'Grady Show (16 November 2005) – 1 episode
- The F Word (1 December 2005) – 1 episode
- Grumpy Old Women (26 May 2006) – 1 episode
- Countdown: Championship of Champions (12–16 June 2006) – 5 episodes
- The Wright Stuff (14 September 2006, 12 January 2018) – 2 episodes
- Loose Women (28 September 2006, 29 May 2007, 13 November 2007, 6 August 2008, 14 December 2009, 15 March 2010, 29 March 2010, 21 March 2011, 22 November 2011, 28 February 2017, 29 August 2018) – 11 episodes
- Heaven and Earth with Gloria Hunniford (1 October 2006) – 1 episode
- Children in Need 2006 (17 November 2006) – 1 episode
- Who Wants to Be a Millionaire? (23 December 2006) – 1 episode
- BBC Breakfast (8 February 2007, 17 September 2007) – 2 episodes
- The Friday Night Project (16 February 2007) – 1 episode
- Comic Relief Does Car Booty (4 March 2007) – 1 episode
- Tonightly (18 August 2008) – 1 episode
- The Gadget Show (16 March 2009) – 1 episode
- Shooting Stars (16 September 2009) – 1 episode
- I'm a Celebrity...Get Me Out of Here! NOW! (4 December 2009) – 1 episode
- Celebrity Eggheads (10 December 2009) – 1 episode
- Victoria Wood: Seen on TV (21 December 2009) – 1 episode
- Celebrity Come Dine with Me (14 March 2010) – 1 episode
- Countdown (29 March–2 April 2010) – 5 episodes
- The Michael Ball Show (16 August 2010) – 1 episode
- Starlight for the Children (16 February 2011) – 1 episode
- Comic Relief: Uptown Downstairs Abbey (18 March 2011) – 1 episode
- Celebrity Juice (10 November 2011) – 1 episode
- Celebrity Big Brother's Bit on the Side (24 August 2012, 3 February 2017, 16 August 2018) – 3 episodes
- The Alan Titchmarsh Show (2 November 2012, 11 September 2013, 22 October 2013, 21 October 2014) – 4 episodes
- Pointless Celebrities (8 December 2012, 19 October 2013) – 2 episodes
- Let's Dance for Sport Relief (23 February 2013) – 1 episode
- This Week (18 April 2013) – 1 episode
- All Star Mr & Mrs (19 June 2013) – 1 episode
- Big Brother's Bit on the Side (4 July 2013, 3 July 2014, 12 August 2014, 5 November 2018) – 4 episodes
- Let's Do Lunch with Gino & Mel (12 July 2013) – 1 episode
- Celebrity Fifteen to One (20 September 2013) – 1 episode
- The Chase: Celebrity Special (19 October 2013) – 1 episode
- Duck Quacks Don't Echo (6 October 2014) – 1 episode
- Keep It in the Family (30 November 2014) – 1 episode
- 2000s: The Best of Bad TV (21 August 2015) – 1 episode
- Celebrity 100% Hotter (10 January 2017) – 1 episode
- The Story of Reality TV (6 June 2018) – 1 episode
- The Imitation Game (23 September 2018) – 1 episode
- Celebrity Call Centre (22 October 2018) – 1 episode
- The Podge and Rodge Show (26 November 2018) – 1 episode
- Granada Reports (28 December 2018) – 1 episode
- Britain's Favourite Sweets (27 January 2019) – 1 episode
- Britain's Favourite Crisps (24 March 2019) – 1 episode
- Tenable All Stars (12 May 2019) – 1 episode
- I'm a Celebrity...Surviving the Jungle (17 December 2019) – 1 episode
- Morning T&T (19 December 2019) – 1 episode
- Joe Lycett's Got Your Back (17 April 2020) – 1 episode
- Served! With Jade Thirlwall (4 June 2020) – 1 episode
- When Celebrity Goes Horribly Wrong 2 (11 September 2020) – 1 episode
- Steph's Packed Lunch (5 March 2021) – 1 episode
- The Celebrity Circle (9 March 2021) – 1 episode
- The Lateish Show with Mo Gilligan (6 August 2021) – 1 episode
- Farage (24 November 2021) – 1 episode
- Tonight Live with Dan Wootton (25 April 2022, 18 May 2022, 26 May 2022, 22 August 2022, 21 September 2022, 2 November 2022, 21 December 2022, 2 January 2023, 15 March 2023, 16 May 2023, 29 May 2023) – 11 episodes
- The Big Proud Party Agency (29 June 2022) – 1 episode
- Tonight Live with Mark Dolan (4 November 2022, 2 December 2022) – 2 episodes
- Face to Face with David (15 March 2023) – 1 episode
- Robin Elliott Tonight (7 May 2024) – 1 episode
- Supermarket Own Brands: The Big Taste Test (9 September 2025) – 1 episode; posthumous

== Bibliography ==
- How Clean Is Your House? with Aggie MacKenzie (2003) ISBN 0-7181-4699-9
- Too Posh to Wash: The Complete Guide to Cleaning Up Your Life with Aggie MacKenzie (2004) ISBN 0-7181-4769-3
- The Cleaning Bible: Kim & Aggie's Complete Guide to Modern Household Management with Aggie MacKenzie (2006) ISBN 0-7181-4906-8
- Unbeaten: The Story of My Brutal Childhood (2006) ISBN 0-340-92221-4
