= Sillä siisti =

Finnish television show

Sillä siisti (That's Clean) is the Finnish version of the British television show How Clean Is Your House? It was broadcast on MTV3.
