= Allt í drasli =

Icelandic television series

Allt í drasli (All in a mess) is the Icelandic version of the British television show How Clean is Your House?. In place of the British hosts, Kim and Aggie, it features Margrét Sigfúsdóttir, a former headmistress of the Housewife School, and Heiðar Jónsson, a beautician. As of 2007, Eva Ásrún Albertsdóttir has replaced Heiðar.
