= Schoon en Meedogenloos =

Flemish television show

Schoon en Meedogenloos ("Clean and Bold", an allusion to the Flemish title of The Bold and the Beautiful namely Mooi en Meedogenloos, more so "schoon" and "mooi" are synonyms) is the Flemish version of the British television show How Clean Is Your House?. The program aired on vtm.
