= Hoe schoon is jouw Huis? =

Hoe schoon is jouw Huis? ("How Clean is Your House?") is the Dutch version of the British television show How Clean is Your House?. It is presented by mother and daughter Liny van Oyen and Marja Middeldorp, and is broadcast by the Dutch channel RTL 4.
