= Aggie MacKenzie =

Scottish television personality, cleaner and writer

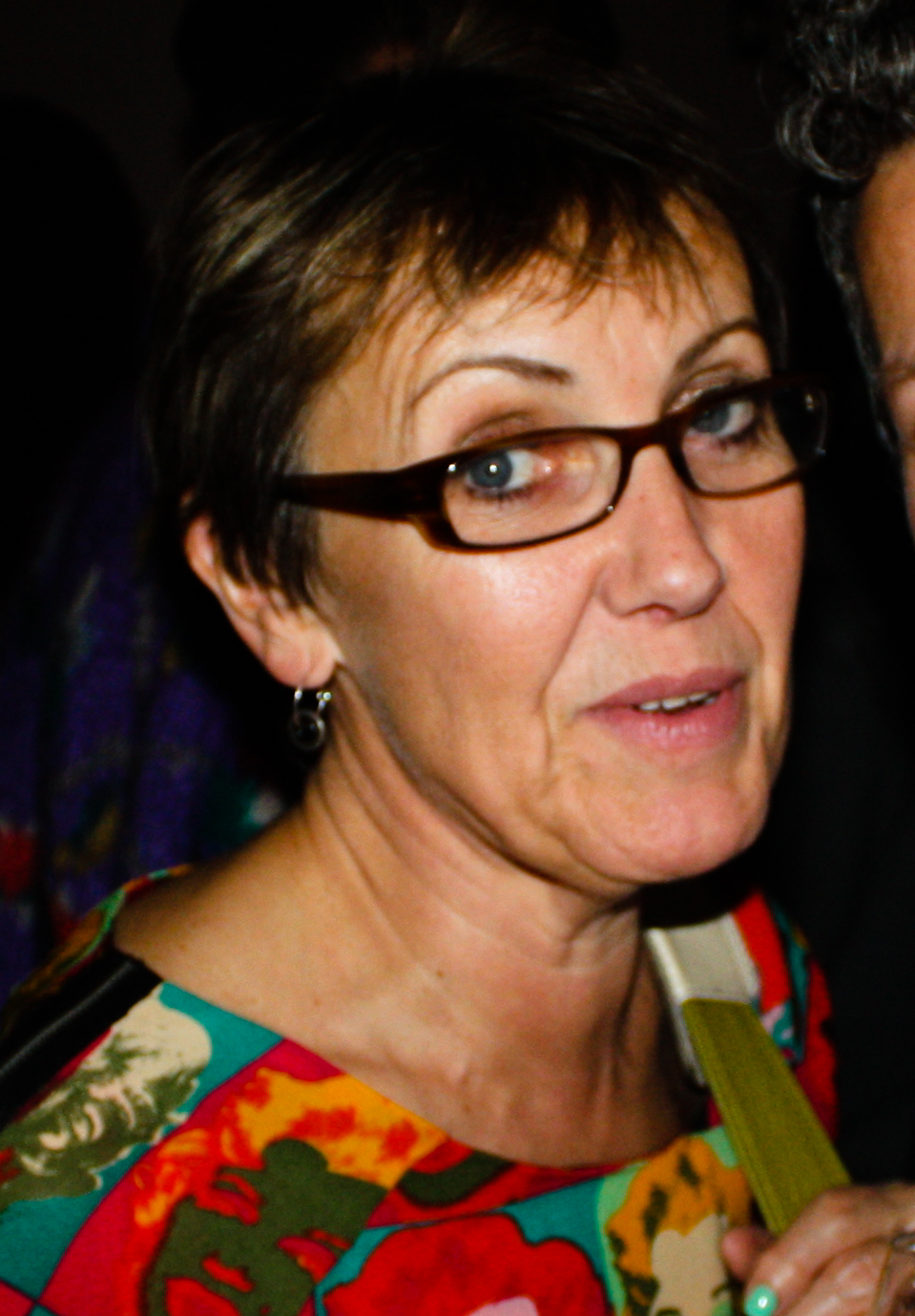
- Mackenzie at the ORA Opening Night, 2010
- Born: Agnes MacKenzie; 12 October 1955 (age 70); Aviemore, Inverness-shire, Scotland
- Other names: The Dirt Detective
- Occupations: Television personality; cleaner; writer
- Years active: 1998–present
- Employer(s): BBC (current); Channel 4 (former)
- Known for: How Clean is Your House? (2003–2009); Storage Hoarders (2012–2013)
- Spouse: Matthew Goulcher (m. 1991; div. 2010)
- Children: 2
- Website: Official website

Agnes MacKenzie (born 12 October 1955) is a Scottish television personality, professional cleaner and writer. She is known for co-presenting the Channel 4 series How Clean Is Your House? (2003–2009) with Kim Woodburn and the ITV daytime series Storage Hoarders (2012–2013).

== Early life ==
Mackenzie was born in 1955 in Rothiemurchus, an area of Aviemore in the Highland area of Scotland. She left Aviemore in 1973 to reside in Aberdeen where she studied to become a bilingual secretary.

One of Mackenzie's first jobs was as a secretary for MI6. After two years working for MI6, Mackenzie was offered an overseas posting, but said she felt that she "was not cut out for embassy life so I left to spread my wings and pursue a career in women’s magazines, which eventually led me to Good Housekeeping".

== Career ==
=== Good Housekeeping ===
In 1998, she became an associate editor for Good Housekeeping magazine, where she frequently wrote cleaning tips. In 2002, her involvement in Good Housekeeping led to her being asked to take part in a Channel 4 cleaning show. After a screen test, programme makers paired her with professional cleaner Kim Woodburn and filming began three weeks later.

=== How Clean Is Your House? ===
How Clean Is Your House? aired from 2003 to 2009, with the duo producing books, board games and DVDs due to the popularity of the series. MacKenzie appeared on The Oprah Winfrey Show in the USA, where How Clean Is Your House? aired on BBC America.

In 2008, Mackenzie and on–screen How Clean Is Your House? partner, Kim Woodburn, had a fall out whilst the series was still airing and being produced by Channel 4. Mackenzie claimed that both she and Woodburn "did not speak" during the last two series of the show, and that "Kim was such a big, damaging part of my life. I feel she almost destroyed me". In response, Woodburn said that she "never said anything derogatory about Aggie", further stating that she was "not going to start now". Woodburn also expressed her confusion about the alleged fall out with Mackenzie, stating that she was "unclear where these false allegations have come from but I wish her all the luck in the world".

=== Other work ===
She also appeared as a guest presenter on STV's daily lifestyle show The Hour, alongside anchor Stephen Jardine for two days in September 2009 and for four days in April 2010. In 2011, she participated in Celebrity Masterchef. In December 2012, Mackenzie presented the ITV programme Storage Hoarders, which returned for a second series in August 2013.

In 2020, Mackenzie collaborated with British high street budget retailer Poundstretcher, launching her own range of affordable surface cleaners. The range of cleaning products consists of eight cleaning solutions.

== Philanthropy ==
MacKenzie has her own charity called Ukuthasa, which supports people in townships in South Africa, helping them with healthcare, education and housing. In an interview with Channel 4 she said: "Whenever I can, such as with this interview, I donate my fee to [the charity]".

== Filmography ==
- How Clean Is Your House? - Channel 4 (2003–2009)
- V Graham Norton - Channel 4 (2003)
- Children in Need - BBC One (2003)
- The Terry and Gaby Show - Channel 5 (2003)
- Hogmanay Live - STV (2003)
- National Television Awards Party of the Year (2004)
- Hell's Kitchen - ITV (2004)
- BBC Breakfast - BBC One/BBC News 24 (2004)
- Friday Night with Jonathan Ross - BBC One (2004)
- Too Posh To Wash - Channel 4 (2004)
- This Morning - ITV (2004)
- EastEnders - BBC One (2004)
- Today with Des and Mel - ITV (2005)
- Dirty Tricks (2005)
- The Paul O'Grady Show - ITV/Channel 4 (2005, 2006)
- The F-Word - Channel 4 (2005)
- The 100 Greatest Family Films - Channel 4 (2005)
- Grumpy Old Women - BBC Two (2006)
- Richard & Judy - Channel 4 (2006)
- Come Dine with Me - Channel 4 (2006)
- The Mint - ITV (2006)
- Hogmanay Stories - STV (2006)
- Dancing on Ice - ITV (2008)
- Loose Women - ITV (2008)
- Hider in the House - BBC Two (2008)
- The Hour - STV (2009)
- All Star Family Fortunes - ITV (2010)
- Celebrity MasterChef - BBC One, BBC Two (2011)
- Total Wipeout - BBC One (2011)
- Storage Hoarders - ITV (2012–2013)
- Who's Doing the Dishes? - ITV (2014)
- Lorraine - ITV (2018)
- Our Shirley Valentine Summer - ITV (2018)
- Jeremy Vine - Channel 5 (2019)
- Tonight - GB News (2022)

== Bibliography ==
- How Clean Is Your House? with Kim Woodburn (2003) ISBN 0-7181-4699-9
- Too Posh to Wash: The Complete Guide to Cleaning Up Your Life with Kim Woodburn (2004) ISBN 0-7181-4769-3
- The Cleaning Bible: Kim and Aggie's Complete Guide to Modern Household Management with Kim Woodburn (2006) ISBN 0-7181-4906-8
