= C'est du propre! =

C'est du propre! (It's Clean!) is a French reality television programme on M6.

Broadcast since 2005, the show is hosted by Danièle Odin and Béatrice de Malembert. The show is based on the popular UK show How Clean is Your House?, in which the hosts visit people with filthy homes and then clean them.
