= VTM 2 =

- Country: Belgium

Programming
- Picture format: 625 Lines PAL (analogue), 576i SDTV (digital), 1080i HDTV

Ownership
- Owner: DPG Media
- Sister channels: VTM; VTM 3; VTM 4; VTM Gold; VTM Life

History
- Launched: 31 January 1995; 31 years ago
- Former names: Ka2 (1995–1997); Kanaal2 (1997–2003); KANAALTWEE (2003–2008); 2BE (2008–2016); Q2 (2016–2020)

Links
- Website: vtm.be

Availability

Streaming media
- VTM Go: Watch live (Belgium only)

VTM 2 (formerly Q2) is a Belgian television channel owned by the commercial broadcasting company DPG Media.

== History ==
=== Ka2 ===
The channel was launched as Ka2 (Dutch pronunciation of K2) on 31 January 1995, the second Flemish private television channel, one day ahead of the launch of VT4. It was positioned as a highbrow complement to VTM, competing against BRTN TV2. The primary goal of Ka2 was to safeguard VTM's obtained market share. The channel's look was designed by Lambie-Nairn and received a gold medal at the 1995 Promax UK Conference Awards.

This phase was seen with division from VMMa members, as some said that the channel wanted to distance itself from VTM by creating its own image, while others believed that the channel wanted to be a sort of VTM 2. Among the channel's local productions was the controversial talk show about sex Vanavond niet, schat (Not Tonight, Dear). The initial format of the channel faced a number of problems, causing it to be retooled.

In 1997, after the Ka2 format ended its run, BRTN TV2 was retooled as Canvas.

=== Kanaal 2 ===
Within less than a year, following the problems VTM faced in its initial format, the channel was renamed Kanaal 2 (Channel 2), in this new guise, the channel attracted a younger demographic than its predecessor and relied heavily on American imports on the cheap.

The logo used in this phase was the word KANAAL (with each letter in blue inside individual yellow squares) and below a larger box with a blue 2.

=== KANAALTWEE ===
In 2000, the channel's name changed to the all-uppercase KANAALTWEE (CHANNELTWO). The rebrand gave way to the first Flemish reality show, a local adaptation of Big Brother, which ended up being successful and gave the channel its highest ratings so far. However, this phase caused the channel to lack a clear identity, causing viewing figures to drop.

=== 2BE ===
On 12 February 2008 the channel changed its name to 2BE, retaining the 2 but referring to the Belgian ISO Country Code BE. The move was to attract ratings as they had been falling: in 2007, KANAALTWEE received a "lackluster" 9.1% against 16.9% in 2001. The goal of the rebrand was to give the channel a "face"; according to director Laurens Verbeke, KANAALTWEE looked "more like a DVD player than a TV channel".

=== Q2 ===
In September 2016, the channel changed its name to Q2. This was an extension of the Qmusic radio station brand owned by Medialaan.

=== VTM 2 ===
On 31 August 2020, Q2 rebranded as VTM 2, as part of a rebranding of the 4 main DPG channels.

After thirty years on Één, VTM 2 secured the rights to the Australian soap opera Neighbours in June 2021, when VRT decided not to renew the contract. The first episode to air on the new rights holder was aired on 14 June; Één's last on 8 June. As of the time of the announcement of the revival on Amazon Freevee in November 2022, VTM 2 was airing episodes from 2021 and the finale was only scheduled to air in January 2024, at the then-current rate. On 1 February 2024, VTM 2 aired the final part of the finale, after which, the rights to the revival were handed over to competing channel Play 5.

== Programming ==
Since its parent company also owns VTM (as well as radio channels), it is not uncommon for programs (especially reruns) to be passed on from one channel to another.

=== Currently aired Imported productions ===
- 24 Hours in A&E
- Ambulance
- American Ninja Warrior
- Border Security Australia
- Dinner Date
- Don't Tell the Bride
- Embarrassing Bodies
- Escape to the Country
- Girlfriends' Guide to Divorce
- Home and Away
- Keeping Up with the Kardashians
- Kitchen Nightmares
- Love It or List It
- MasterChef Australia
- My Kitchen Rules UK
- One Born Every Minute
- Project Runway
- RuPaul's Drag Race
- SAS: Who Dares Wins
- The Hotel Inspector
- The Real Housewives
- Worst Cooks in America

=== Formerly aired Flemish (co-)productions ===
- 2BE Games & Chat (interactive daytime television) (former)
- AstroContact (phone-in program about astrology)
- Benelux' Next Top Model (reality)
- Benidorm Bastards (comedy)
- Big Brother & its BV (celebrity) version
- De Heren Maken de Man (Flemish version of Queer Eye for the Straight Guy)
- De Ja of Nee Show (game show/entertainment)
- De Raf & Ronny Show (Flemish sitcom)
- Dennis (Flemish sitcom)
- En dan nu... reclame
- Expeditie Robinson (reality) (Dutch-Flemish version of Expedition Robinson)
- Familie Backeljau (Flemish sitcom)
- Foute Vrienden
- Honderd Hete Vragen (entertaining 'sex education')
- Inbox
- M!LF
- Open en Bloot (entertaining 'sex education')
- Pitstop.TV (motor sports)
- Play Today (phone-in quiz show)
- Schoon en Meedogenloos (Flemish version of How Clean is Your House?)

=== Formerly aired Imported productions ===
- 24
- 7th Heaven
- According to Jim
- Agents of S.H.I.E.L.D.
- American Crime Story
- Angel
- Arrested Development
- Big Wolf on Campus
- Black Sails
- Black Tie Nights
- Bones
- Buffy the Vampire Slayer
- Burn Notice
- Charmed
- Chuck
- Cold Case
- Continuum
- Cops
- Covert Affairs
- Crime Investigation Australia
- Damages
- Deadliest Catch
- Dharma & Greg
- Dirt
- Dracula
- Dragon Ball Z
- Empty Nest
- ER
- Everwood
- Family Business
- Family Guy
- Family Matters
- Fastlane
- Full House
- Futurama
- Game of Thrones
- Gilmore Girls
- Glee
- Ghosted
- Grimm
- Hex
- Homeland
- House
- How I Met Your Mother
- Jack & Jill
- Joey
- John Doe
- Journeyman
- Judge Judy
- Kyle XY
- Law & Order: Los Angeles
- Leverage
- Lie to Me
- Life in Pieces
- Mad Men
- Malcolm in the Middle
- Max Steel
- Merlin
- Modern Family
- Mr. Robot
- Muhteşem Yüzyıl
- My Wife and Kids
- Neighbours
- New Girl
- Nip/Tuck
- North Shore
- One Tree Hill
- Operation Repo
- Pawn Stars
- Point Pleasant
- Police Interceptors
- Prison Break
- Quantico
- Raising Hope
- Richard Hammond's Crash Course
- Rosewood
- Royal Pains
- Sexcetera
- Siren
- Six Feet Under
- Sleepy Hollow
- Smallville
- So You Think You Can Dance
- Sons of Anarchy
- Spartacus
- Star Trek: Enterprise
- Stargate Atlantis
- Stargate SG-1
- Still Standing
- Strike Back
- S.W.A.T.
- Terra Nova
- That '70s Show
- The 4400
- The Avengers: Earth's Mightiest Heroes
- The Big Bang Theory
- The Brave
- The Cape
- The Closer
- The Crossing
- The Event
- The Fresh Prince of Bel-Air
- The Gifted
- The Good Guys
- The Graham Norton Show
- The Middle
- The Muppets
- The Nanny
- The O.C.
- The Orville
- The Passage
- The Practice
- The Simpsons
- The Sopranos
- The Unusuals
- The Voice
- The Voice UK
- The Walking Dead
- The West Wing
- Top Gear
- Touch
- Traffic Cops
- Transporter: The Series
- Tru Calling
- Trauma
- Two and a Half Men
- Two Guys and a Girl
- Veronica Mars
- Vikings
- What I Like About You
- Wilfred
- Will & Grace
- Without a Trace
- Women's Murder Club
- World's Most Amazing Videos
- Xena: Warrior Princess
- Yes, Dear

== See also ==
- List of television stations in Belgium
