= Ernst-Paul Hasselbach =

Dutch television host and producer (1965–2008)

- Born: 23 May 1965; Paramaribo, Suriname
- Died: 11 October 2008 (aged 43); Lom Municipality, Norway
- Occupation: TV presenter
- Notable credit(s): Expeditie Robinson; Peking Express; 71° Noord
- Relatives: Harald Hasselbach

Ernst-Paul Hasselbach (23 May 1965 – 11 October 2008) was a Dutch TV host and producer. He hosted several shows on Dutch and Belgian television.

== Early years ==
Hasselbach was the son of a Dutch father and a Surinamese mother. His father's work meant that he lived around the world growing up. Hasselbach lived in the Netherlands, Suriname, Kenya, Indonesia, and Canada. After finishing secondary school in Vancouver, British Columbia, he returned to the Netherlands to study in Amsterdam. As well as his studies in "Academie voor Lichamelijke Opvoeding", he studied English at the Vrije Universiteit.

== Television career ==
Hasselbach started his television career in 1995. Between 2000 and his death in 2008 he hosted and produced ten editions of Expeditie Robinson, the Dutch-Belgian version of Survivor. In 2004 he hosted the first season of Peking Express.

== Personal life ==
His brother Harald Hasselbach was a Super Bowl champion with the Denver Broncos in 1997 and 1998 and a Grey Cup champion with the Calgary Stampeders in 1992.

=== Death ===
Ernst-Paul Hasselbach died in an automobile accident in Lom Municipality, Norway, while shooting the television show 71° Noord. He left behind his girlfriend, Gracia Witteman, and their daughter as well as two sons from an earlier relationship.
